= Manor of Poltimore =

Historic manor in Devon, England

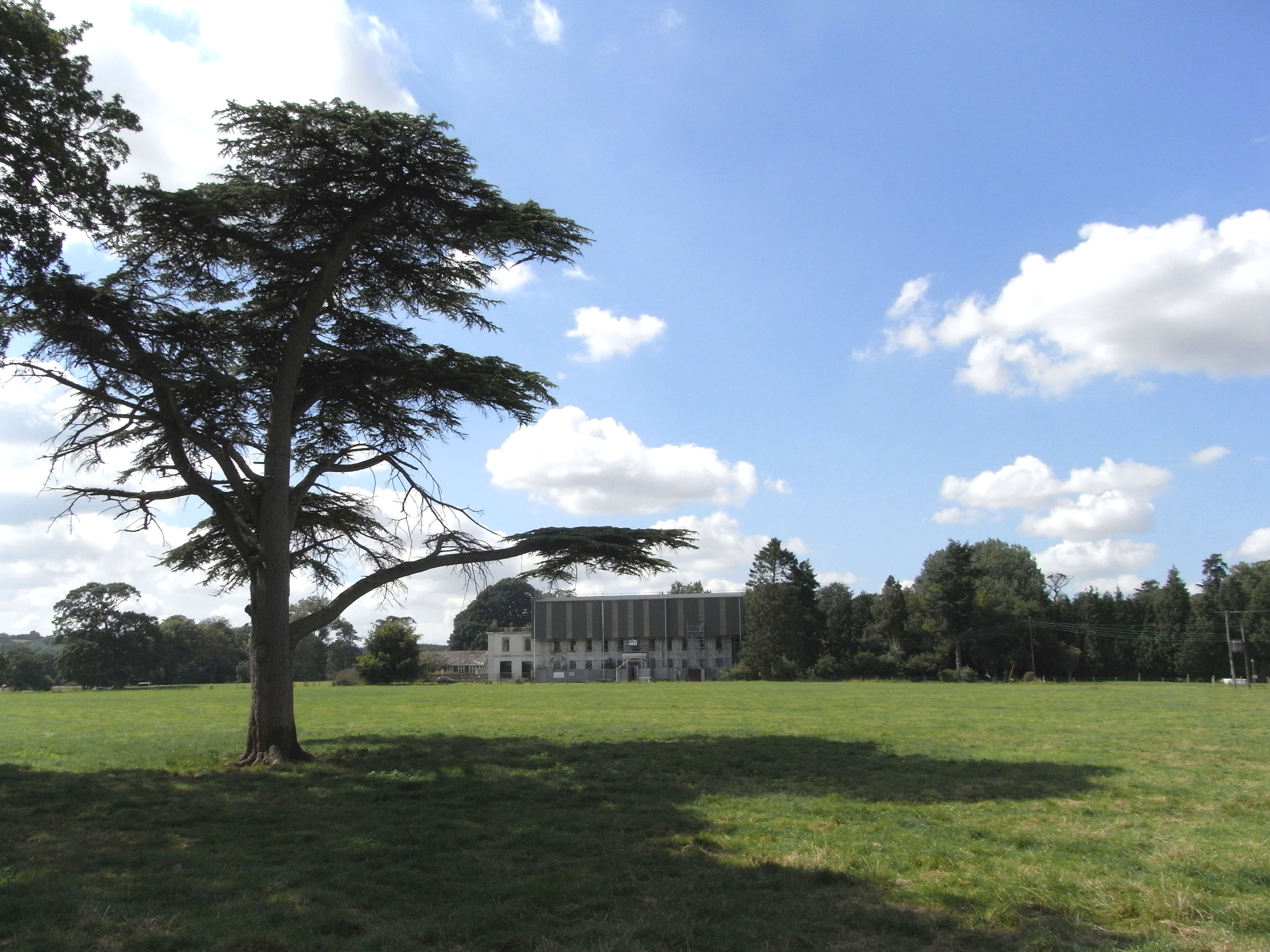
Poltimore House, the dilapidated manor house of the manor of Poltimore, viewed in 2015 from within the park, looking towards the north-west

The Manor of Poltimore is a former manor in Devon, England. The manor house known as Poltimore House survives in its 18th-century remodelled form, but has been dilapidated for several decades. A charity named the "Poltimore House Trust" has been established for the purpose of its restoration. The manor was situated within the historic Wonford Hundred and was largely coterminous with the parish of Poltimore and contained the village of Poltimore, 4 miles (6.4 km) north-east of the historic centre of the City of Exeter. It should not be confused with the eponymous Devon estate of Poltimore in the parish of Farway, 16 miles (26 km) east of Exeter. Poltimore was the principal seat of the Bampfylde family from c. 1300 to 1920.

== Descent ==
The identification of the manor of Poltimore, later seat of the Bampfylde family, with a location mentioned in the Domesday Book of 1086 is problematical. The Domesday Book lists two estates, PULTIMORE, the first-listed of the five Devonshire holdings of the king's tenant-in-chief Haimeric of Arques, Pas de Calais, Picardy and PONTIMORE (sic), the 90th of the 176 Devonshire holdings of Baldwin the Sheriff (died 1090). According to Worthy (1896), neither corresponds to the Bampfylde's manor of Poltimore, which he suggests was not listed separately in the Domesday Book, but rather was parcel of one of the two Domesday Book royal manors named CLISTE, namely the one later known as "Clist Moins", now "West Clyst", in the parish of Broadclyst, in the historic Cliston hundred. This estate of "Clist Moins" was later held from the feudal barony of Okehampton, which later comprised the former fiefdom of Baldwin the Sheriff.

The descent of the manor was as follows:

=== Baldwin the Sheriff (died 1090) ===
As recorded in the Domesday Book of 1086 the first post-Norman Conquest holder of the manor was Baldwin the Sheriff (died 1090), whose fiefdom in Devon was the largest in that county, recorded in the Domesday Book as comprising 176 holdings, including PONTIMORE (sic). His tenants were the Canons of "St Mary's", as recorded in the Domesday Book. Worthy (1896) suggested that this religious establishment was St. Mary's Church in Rouen, Normandy, (i.e. Rouen Cathedral, Notre-Dame de Rouen) but Reichel rejected this suggestion and instead proposed that it was the Collegiate Church of St Mary, situated within the walls of Exeter Castle, which collegiate church is believed to have been founded by Baldwin.

=== de Poltimore ===
Arms of de Poltimore: Azure, a griffin segreant or

At some later period Poltimore was held by the de Poltimore family which took its name from the manor, as was usual at that time. They also held an estate in Glamorgan called Poltymore. The descent given by Pole (died 1635) was as follows:

- Stephan de Poltimore
- Bartholemewe de Poltimore
- Sir Richard de Poltimore
- Sir Richard de Poltimore (son), who granted Poltimore to Simon de Montagu, 1st Baron Montagu (died 1316).

=== Montagu ===
Simon de Montagu, 1st Baron Montagu (died 1316) acquired the manor of Poltimore from Sir Richard de Poltimore and in 1297 sold it for £200 to William Pontington, a Canon of Exeter Cathedral.

=== Pontington ===
William Pontington (died 1307), a Canon of Exeter Cathedral, purchased the manor of Poltimore in 1297 for the sum of £200 from Simon de Montagu, 1st Baron Montagu (died 1316). William de Puntyngdon succeeded Thomas de Charleton as Archdeacon of Totnes on 28 September 1303, and had been Precentor of Exeter Cathedral in 1302. The origins of William Pontington are not recorded. According to Pole he gave Poltimore to John Baunfild (John Bampfield), whom he called in a Latin deed his alumnus ("foster-son, pupil, disciple"), and who was the founder of the Bampfield/Bampfylde family of Poltimore.

=== Bampfield ===
Arms of Bampfylde: Or, on a bend gules three mullets argent

==== John Bamfielde ====
John Bamfielde of Poltimore and Weston Bampfylde, Somerset, married Ellinor Beauchamp, a daughter of Sir Humfrey Beauchamp of Ryme. By 1292 John Bampfylde held an estate in Great and Little Weston, Somerset, possibly in right of his wife. He was the son of John Baunfeld (fl. 1199/1216) and married a daughter and heiress of a John Hastings, whose identity is unclear. In the Nomina Villarum of 1316 a certain de Bamfeld is described as "Lord of Poltimore" and on 5 March 1340/41 his son "John de Bamfeld" is recorded as patron of the Rectory of Poltimore.

==== John Bamfielde ====
John Bamfielde of Poltimore (son), married Joane de Merton (died 1420), a daughter and co-heiress of Sir Richard de Merton, of Merton, Devon, whose family also inherited a moiety of the feudal barony of Great Torrington. She survived her husband and remarried to Sir John de la Pomeray (1347–1416), feudal baron of Berry Pomeroy, Devon.

==== Thomas Bamfield ====
Thomas Bamfield of Poltimore (son), who married Agnes Copleston, daughter of Adam (or John) Copleston of Copleston, in the parish of Colebrooke Devon.

==== John Bampfield ====
John Bampfield (son), of Poltimore, who married Joane Hoxham, daughter and heiress of John (or William) Hoxham of Hoxham, adjacent to Poltimore. Both Pole (died 1635) and Risdon (died 1640) state that the marriage was without children but that the Hoxham estates were nevertheless inherited by the Bampfields by entail.

==== Thomas Bampfield ====
Thomas Bampfield, (eldest son, according to the Heraldic Visitation of Devon pedigree), who married Agnes Faber, daughter and co-heiress of John Faber. His second son was Richard Bampfield (died 1430) of Columbjohn in Devon, who received a grant of that estate to himself and "the heirs male of his body", from "Edward, Earl of Devon". He died without male children, and thus the estate escheated to Thomas Courtenay, Earl of Devon.

==== John Bampfield ====
John Bampfield (son), who married a certain Joane. Pole states that "John Bampfield, the ancestor of Bampfield of Poltimore" married Isabel Cobham, one of the co-heiresses of the manor of Blackborough, and the arms of Cobham of Blackborough are amongst the 30 quarterings above the effigy and monument to Sir Amyas Bampfield (d.1626) in All Saints Church, North Molton.

==== John Bampfield (fl. 14th century) ====
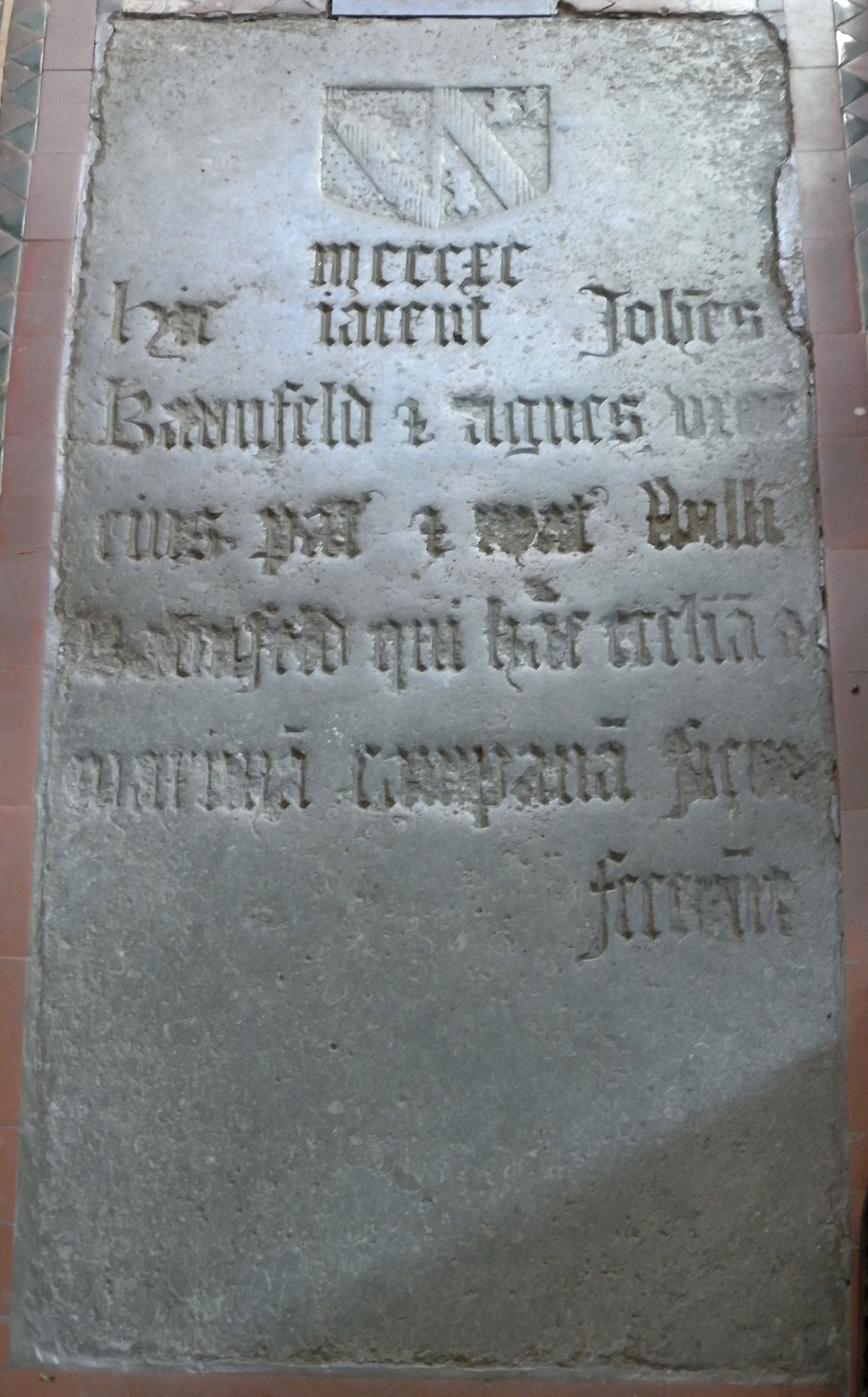
14th century ledger stone to John Bampfield, chancel aisle, Poltimore Church

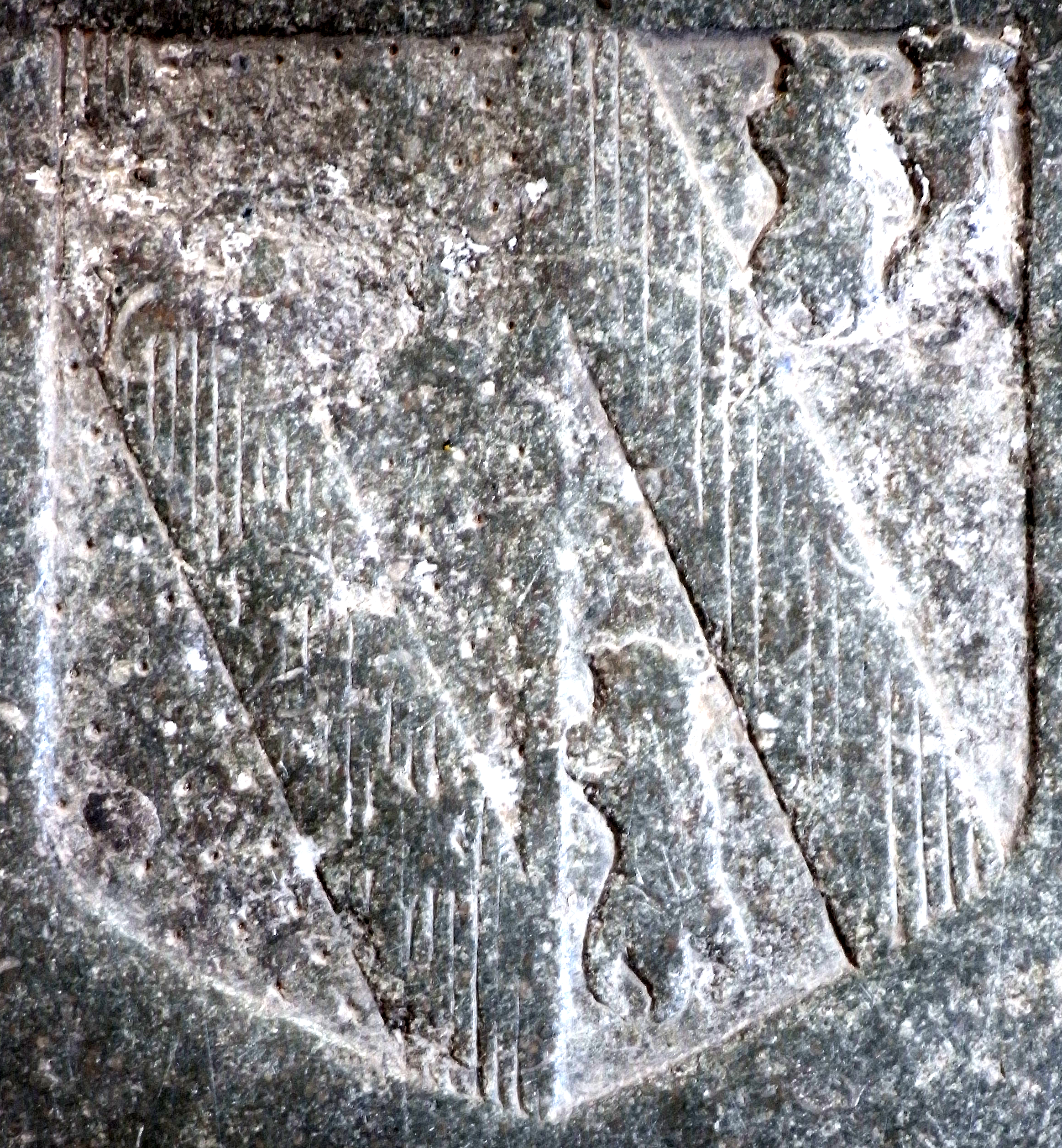
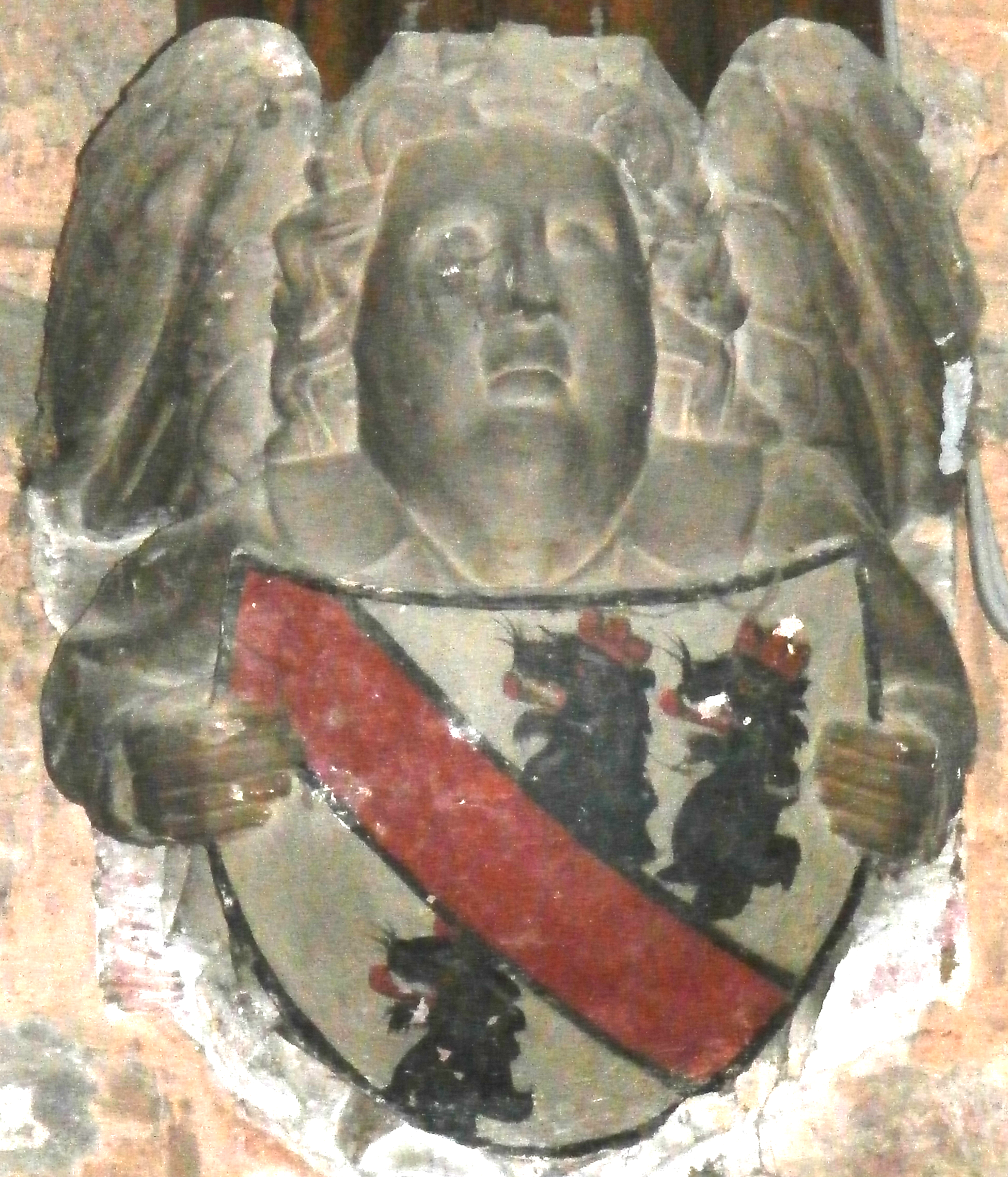
Left: Arms of Bampfield impaling Pederton, detail from ledger stone to John Bampfield, Poltimore Church. Right: arms of Pederton on a corbel in the nave

John Bampfield (son) (fl. 14th century), who married Agnes Pederton, daughter and heiress of John Pederton of Hardington, Somerset, by his wife Cecilia Turney, daughter and heiress of John Turney. By his wife he had two sons, the eldest Sir William Bampfield of Poltimore, the youngest Peter Bampfield of Hardington, Somerset. Bamfield and his wife Agnes Pederton rebuilt the Parish Church of Poltimore, as is evidenced by an inscribed ledgerstone, said by Worthy (1896) to have been moved from the nave to the chancel, bearing the following Latin text:

"MCCCXC. Hic jacent Joh(ann)es Baunfeld et Agnes uxor eius, pat(er) et mat(er) Will(ielm)i Baunfeld, qui ha(n)c eccl(es)ia(m) et maxima(m) campana(m) fieri fecer(u)nt" ("1390. Here lie John Bampfield and Agnes his wife, the father and mother of William Bampfield, who caused to come into being this church and the greatest bell"). The arms are Bampfield impaling Pederton: Argent, a bend gules between three lion's heads erased and ducally crowned sable.

==== Sir William Bampfield (died 1474) ====
Sir William Bampfield (died 1474)) of Poltimore, (eldest son), Sheriff of Devon in 1426. he married Margaret Pauncefoot daughter of Walter Pauncefoot of Compton, Somerset.

==== Walter Bampfield ====
Walter Bampfield (1446–1478) (eldest son and heir), who married twice:

- Firstly to Constance Langsford, daughter of Edward Langsford; without children.
- Secondly to Grace Pudsey, daughter of Sir Ralph Pudsey. She survived her husband and remarried to Sir Roger Tetcote. By his second wife he had a son Andrew Bampfield (see below).

==== Andrew Bampfield (born 1474) ====
Andrew Bampfield (born 1474) (son), who died childless, apparently as an infant, when the heir to the Bampfield estates was his uncle William Bampfield.

==== William Bampfield ====
William Bampfield (uncle, second son of Sir William Bampfield (died 1474)) of Poltimore). He married twice:

- Firstly to Margaret St Maur, a daughter and co-heiress of John St Maur of Rode, and heir to her niece Mary Drury.
- Secondly to Margaret Kirkham, daughter of Nicholas Kirkham (1433–1516) of Blagdon in the parish of Paignton in Devon, and widow of John Cheyne of Pinhoe. She survived her husband and remarried to a Grenville of Stowe, Kilkhampton in Cornwall and of Bideford in Devon.

==== Sir Edward Bampfield (died 1528) ====
Sir Edward Bampfield (died 1528), eldest son and heir by his father's first wife Margaret St Maur. He married Elizabeth Wadham, daughter of Sir Nicholas Wadham (1472-1542) of Merryfield, Ilton in Somerset and of Edge, Branscombe in Devon (a widow at the time of her second marriage, she later married John Warre of Chipleigh. One of their four daughters, Elizabeth Bampfield, was the wife of George Perceval (1561–1601) of Sydenham, near Bridgwater, Somerset, and mother of Richard Percival (1550–1620) an administrator and politician, who wrote a Spanish grammar for English readers and was the ancestor of the Earl of Egmont.

==== Richard Bampfield (1526–1594) ====
Richard Bampfield (1526–1594) of Poltimore and Bampfylde House in Exeter, was Sheriff of Devon in 1576, and in 1550 began construction of the Tudor era, Poltimore House. He was the son and heir of Sir Edward Bampfield and Elizabeth Wadham.

His father died when Richard was an infant aged two, and he entered wardship, concerning which John Prince, (died 1723) relates a story "of undoubted credit":

It was thus, his father dying, the young gentleman fell a ward to some great person in the east-country, who seized upon him while he was very young, carryed him away to his own home. He being now possessed of his person and estate, some years after gave it out he was gone to travel (or the like pretence); insomuch, his relations and friends believing it to be true, looked no farther after him. So that concealing from him his quality and condition and preventing what he could any discovery thereof, his guardian bred him up as his servant and at last made him his huntsman. It happened that one of Mr Bampfeild's (sic) tenants, understanding something of this mistery, made it his business first to find him out and next to discourse with him about it, which in a little time he had an opportunity to do, when acquainting him with his birth and fortunes, it was agreed on between them that he should come at such a time and privately fetch him away. This he did accordingly and so retrieved the right heir of the family".

Wotton (died 1766), later relates the story similarly, with extra details which identify the subject as Richard Bampfield:

"...but one of his tenants (being his nurse's husband) discovering where he was detained, made him acquainted with his fortune; the truth of which he convinced him of, by a remarkable mole which he had in his back, and brought him away privately to Brimpton, the seat of John Sydenham, Esq., who assiled him in his return to Poltimore, and soon after gave him his daughter in marriage. In confirmation of which, he lies at length, with a hound at his feet, under a monument in Poltimore church. Having received no account from the family, concerning this particular, I do not presume to give it as authentic."

He married Elizabeth Sydenham (died 1599), daughter of Sir John Sydenham of Brympton d'Evercy, Somerset. The couple's monument, dated 1604, survives in Poltimore Church, showing the sculpted stone effigies of Richard and his wife, with the "hound at his feet" mentioned by Worthy. He had nine daughters and three sons, the eldest of whom, Giles Bampfield, died without children during his father's lifetime on a voyage to Ireland.

==== Sir Amyas Bampfylde (1564–1626) ====
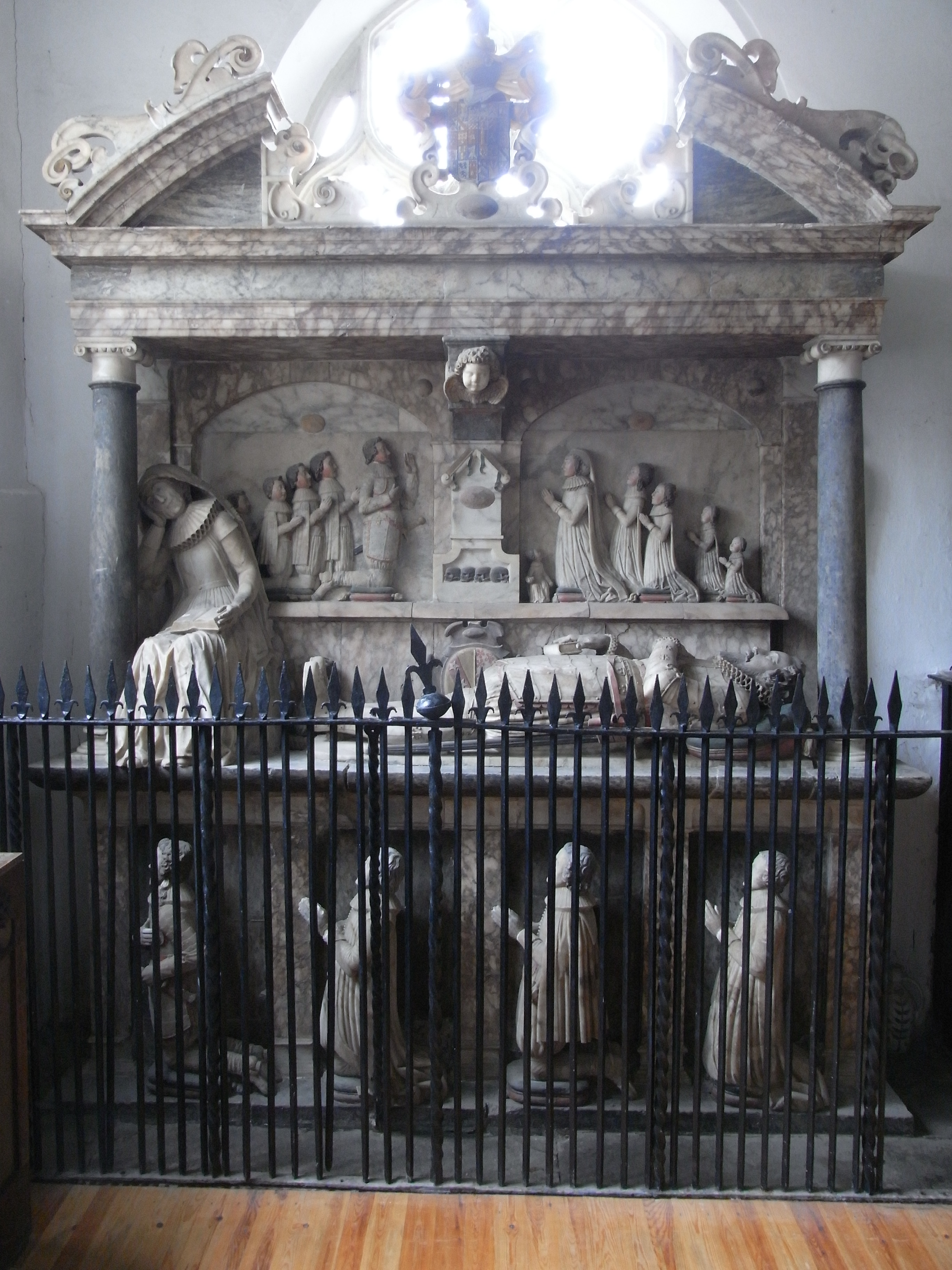
Monument to Sir Amyas Bampfylde, All Saints' Church, North Molton

Sir Amyas Bampfylde (1564–1626), second and eldest surviving son and heir, of Poltimore and North Molton. He was Member of Parliament for Devon in 1597, Sheriff of Devon from 1603 to 1604 and a Deputy Lieutenant in 1616. In 1576 he married Elizabeth Clifton, daughter of Sir John Clifton of Barrington Court, Somerset. By his wife he had six sons and four daughters.

==== John Bampfylde (c. 1586 – c. 1657) ====
John Bampfylde (c. 1586 – c. 1657), eldest son and heir, of Poltimore and North Molton, was MP for Tiverton (1621) and Devon (1628–9). In 1602 his father Sir Amyas Bampfylde and Thomas Drake, brother and heir of Admiral Sir Francis Drake, made a double marriage settlement for Bampfylde's eldest son John Bampfylde, then aged 14, and his daughter Jane Bampfield, then aged 16, who were to marry Drake’s daughter and son, with each parent settling £660 on the other’s daughter. He therefore married Elizabeth Drake, daughter of Thomas Drake of Buckland and niece of Admiral Sir Francis Drake, by whom he had children including:

- Sir John Bampfylde, 1st Baronet (1590–1650), 3rd and eldest surviving son and heir.
- Francis Bampfield (died 1663/4), 6th son, a Nonconformist minister who died in Newgate Prison
- Thomas Bampfield (died 1693), 8th son, MP, briefly Speaker of the House of Commons.

==== Sir John Bampfylde, 1st Baronet (1590–1650) ====
Sir John Bampfylde, 1st Baronet (1590–1650), 3rd and eldest surviving son and heir, MP. He married Gertrude Coplestone (died 1658), a daughter of Amias Coplestone (1582–1621) of Copleston in the parish of Colebrooke and of Warleigh House in the parish of Tamerton Foliot, both in Devon. She was a co-heiress to her brother John Coplestone (1609–1632), and inherited amongst other properties the manor of Tamerton Foliot, which thus passed into the Bampfylde family. His inscribed ledger stone survives, set into the floor of the nave of Poltimore Church.

==== Sir Coplestone Bampfylde, 2nd Baronet (c. 1633 – 1692) ====
Sir Coplestone Bampfylde, 2nd Baronet (c. 1633 – 1692) (eldest son), was one of the Worthies of Devon of John Prince (died 1723). His father died when he was still a minor. He was educated at Corpus Christi College, Oxford, where he became a Member, "in the quality of a Nobleman". "How well he answered that title appeared from his very splendid way of living there, and that large and noble plate he left to his College when he went thence, which remained a long while after a monument of his munificence, until at length, with fome other pieces, it was solen away". He returned to Devon during the Commonwealth government of Oliver Cromwell, "But, having a vigorous soul, actuated, even then, with principles of loyalty to his sovereign, though in exile, and of duty to the church, then under a cloud, he became very industrious, with several other persns of honour and quality in these parts, for the happy restoration of both". His arrest was ordered by Cromwell's government, but he hid himself away successfully at Trill, a residence of his friend, Sir John Drake, Baronet. "Notwithstanding any theatening danger that might happen, his generous mind could not be affrighted from following his duty and honour", he joined in the signing of a Remonstrance drawn up at the quarter-sessions in Exeter which demanded a free Parliament, which was supported by much of that city's population. The Remonstrance was presented to Parliament by his uncle Thomas Bampfylde, Recorder of Exeter, and encouraged other towns and cities in England to do likewise. the like, "Whereby the army in and about London, consisting of fourteen thousand odd foot foldiers, were disperfed throughout the kingdom (of which fifteen hundred were sent to Exeter) to prevent the like insurrection as had happened there, elfewhere. Which disperfion, how much it facilitated General Monk's march into London but with seven thousand odd soldiers, and consequently, how greatly this bold and brisk address of our Country Gentlemen, promoted the happy Restoration of Church and State, which soon happened hereupon, is very obvious to observe, if not so easy for envy to acknowledge". It was "this great patriot" Sir Copleston Bampfield who later presented on behalf of the County of Devon a Petition of Right to General Monck, a fellow Devonian, who had landed in Devon with an army "to restore the nation to its right senses". For this he was imprisoned in the Tower of London by the Rump Parliament, but was soon released on the Restoration of the Monarchy in 1660. He was the first Sheriff of Devon appointed by King Charles II in 1661, "Which office Sir Coplestone executed with great splendor, in an extraordinary number of liveries and attendants" He served as MP for Devon. He was colonel of the Devon Militia until the time of Monmouth's invasion, when he retired due to ill health to be succeeded in the colonelcy by his son. He was at first a supporter of King William of Orange, but later opposed his rule, considering that "matters were carried beyond all imaginations, fearing a change would be made in the fundamental conftitution of the Government" and refused to pay the newly declared rates and taxes, which were therefore enforced on him by a levy of distress upon his goods. He died of gout aged 55 in 1691 at Warleigh and was buried in Poltimore Church. Before his death he charged his family strictly always to continue faithful to the religion of the established Church of England and to pay allegiance to the right heirs of the Crown. He married twice:

- Firstly on 16 November 1655 to Margaret Bulkeley, daughter of Francis Bulkeley of Burgate, Hampshire, by whom he had two sons and a daughter:
  - Col. Hugh Bampfield (died 1690), eldest son and heir apparent, who predeceased his father having died in a fall from his horse. He married Mary Clifford, daughter of James Clifford of Ware, by whom he had 2 sons:
    - Sir Coplestone Bampfylde, 3rd Baronet (c. 1689 – 1727), eldest son, of Poltimore.
    - John Bampfylde (1691–1750) of Hestercombe, Somerset, 2nd son, MP for Exeter (1715–1722) and for Devon (1736–1741).
  - John Coplestone Bulkeley Bampfield, 2nd son, who died without issue.
  - Margaret Bampfield, died an infant.
- Secondly at Houghton, Devon, on 21 October 1674 to Jane Pole, daughter of Sir Courtenay Pole, 2nd Baronet of Shute, Devon; without children.

==== Sir Coplestone Warwick Bampfylde, 3rd Baronet (c. 1689 – 1727) ====
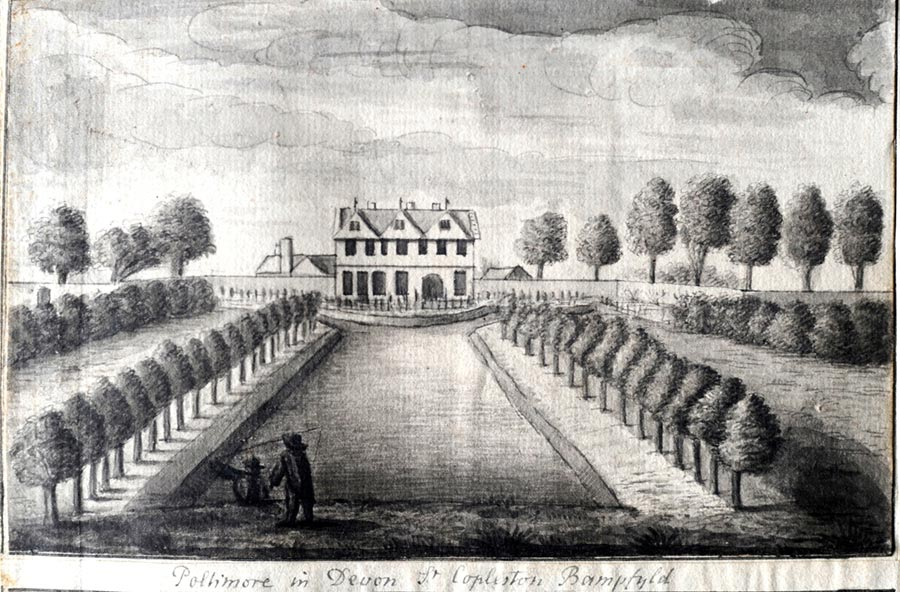
Poltimore House, drawing by Edmund Prideaux (1693–1745) of Prideaux Place, Cornwall inscribed: Poltimore in Devon, Sir Copleston Bampfyld

Sir Coplestone Warwick Bampfylde, 3rd Baronet (c. 1689 – 1727) (grandson). He was a High Tory Member of Parliament for Exeter (1710–1713) and for Devon (1713–1727). As well as having inherited his grandfather's extensive Devonshire estates, including Poltimore and North Molton, he also inherited the estates of his distant cousin Warwick Bampfylde (1623–1695) of Hardington, Somerset (5th in descent from Peter Bampfylde of Hardington, younger brother of Sir William Bampfylde (died 1474) of Poltimore), to whom he acted as executor. He married Gertrude Carew, daughter of Sir John Carew, 3rd Baronet (died 1692) of Antony, Cornwall.

==== Sir Richard Warwick Bampfylde, 4th Baronet (1722–1767) ====
Sir Richard Warwick Bampfylde, 4th Baronet (1722–1767), only son and heir, MP for Exeter (1743–1747) and for Devonshire (1747–1776). He married Jane Codrington (died 1789), daughter and heiress of Colonel John Codrington of Wraxall, Somerset. In 1741 he sold the former Copleston manor and seat of Tamerton Foliot, with its manor house of Warleigh, to Walter Radcliffe, son of Walter Radcliffe of Frankland, Sheriff of Devon in 1696. In 1741 his seats were Copleston and Poltimore in Devon and Hardington in Somerset.

==== Sir Charles Warwick Bampfylde, 5th Baronet (1753–1823) ====
Sir Charles Warwick Bampfylde, 5th Baronet (1753–1823), 2nd and eldest surviving son and heir, who served twice as Member of Parliament for Exeter, in 1774–1790 and 1796–1812. He married Catharine Moore, eldest daughter of Admiral Sir John Moore, 1st Baronet.

==== George Bampfylde, 1st Baron Poltimore (1786–1858) ====
Sir George Warwick Bampfylde, 6th Baronet (1786–1858) (created Baron Poltimore in 1831). In 1844 he sold the manor of Weston Bampfylde in Somerset, which his family had held since the 13th century.

==== Augustus Frederick George Warwick Bampfylde, 2nd Baron Poltimore (1837–1908) ====
Augustus Frederick George Warwick Bampfylde, 2nd Baron Poltimore (1837–1908); only son of the 1st Baron

==== Coplestone Richard George Warwick Bampfylde, 3rd Baron Poltimore (1859–1918) ====
Coplestone Richard George Warwick Bampfylde, 3rd Baron Poltimore (1859–1918); eldest son of the 2nd Baron

==== George Wentworth Warwick Bampfylde, 4th Baron Poltimore (1882–1965) ====
George Wentworth Warwick Bampfylde, 4th Baron Poltimore (1882–1965); eldest son of the 3rd Baron. In 1920 he sold the Poltimore estate but the house and grounds failed to find a buyer. The house was let to Poltimore College, a girls' school which closed in 1939. In 1940 the boys from Dover College were evacuated to Poltimore House, which became a private hospital in 1945 which was taken over by the National Health Service when it came into existence in 1948. It closed as a hospital in 1974. Soon after the accidental death in 1936 of his only son and heir apparent, he also sold most of the North Molton estate and moved to Rhodesia in Africa. In 1968 his widow's residence was Benwell, Bindura, Rhodesia. The remnant of the North Molton estate, including Court House, the manor house, he gave to his daughter (by his first wife) Hon. Sheila Margaret Warwick Bampfylde, the wife of Sir Dennis Stucley, 5th Baronet of Affeton Castle and Hartland Abbey in Devon. The 4th Baron married twice:

- Firstly in 1910 Cynthia Rachel Lascelles (died 1961), daughter of Hon. Gerald William Lascelles, a younger son of the Earl of Harewood, by whom he had children:
  - Hon. Coplestone John de Grey Warwick Bampfylde (1914–1936), only son and heir apparent, an officer in the Royal Horseguards, who predeceased his father, having died aged 23 in a horse-racing accident.
  - Hon. Sheila Margaret Warwick Bampfylde (born 1912), the wife of Sir Dennis Stucley, 5th Baronet (1907–1983) of Affeton Castle and Hartland Abbey in Devon, by whom she had a son and heir Sir Hugh George Copplestone Bampfylde Stucley, 6th Baronet (born 1945).
- Secondly in 1962 to Barbara Pitcairn Nicol, daughter of Peter Nicol of Kirkintilloch, Scotland.

==== Arthur Blackett Warwick Bampfylde, 5th Baron Poltimore (1883–1967) ====
Arthur Blackett Warwick Bampfylde, 5th Baron Poltimore (1883–1967); younger brother, 2nd son of 3rd Baron

==== Hugh de Burgh Warwick Bampfylde, 6th Baron Poltimore (1888–1978) ====
Hugh de Burgh Warwick Bampfylde, 6th Baron Poltimore (1888–1978); younger brother, 3rd and youngest son of 3rd Baron. In 1968 his residence was The Ancient House, Peasenhall, Saxmundham, Suffolk.

==== Mark Coplestone Bampfylde, 7th Baron Poltimore (born 1957) ====
Mark Coplestone Bampfylde, 7th Baron Poltimore (born 1957); eldest grandson of the 6th Baron.

== Sources ==
- Worthy, Charles, Devonshire Wills: A Collection of Annotated Testamentary Abstracts together with the Family History and Genealogy of Many of the Most Ancient Gentle Houses of the West of England, London, 1896, pp. 474–484, Bampfylde of Poltimore
- Wotton, Thomas, The English Baronetage, London, 1741, Vol 2, pp. 188–195, Bampfylde of Poltimore
- Wotton, Thomas, The English Baronetage, London, 1771, Vol 1, pp. 374–381, Bampfylde of Poltimore
- Vivian, Lt.Col. J.L., (Ed.) The Visitations of the County of Devon: Comprising the Heralds' Visitations of 1531, 1564 & 1620, Exeter, 1895, pp. 38–41, Bamfield of Poltimore
