= John Bampfield =

English politician

Member of Parliament for Devon
- In office 1628-1629
- Preceded by: Sir George Chudleigh; Humphrey Weare
- Succeeded by: John Drake; John Pole

Member of Parliament for Tiverton
- In office 1621-1622

Personal details
- Born: c. 1586 England
- Died: c. 1657 (aged 70–71)
- Spouse: Elizabeth Drake (m. 1602)
- Children: 5+, including John, Francis and Thomas
- Parent: Amias Bampfield (father)
- Relatives: Richard Bampfield (grandfather)
- Education: Exeter College, Oxford
- Occupation: Politician

Arms of Bampfylde: Or, on a bend gules three mullets argent.

John Bampfield (c. 1586 – c. 1657) of Poltimore House and North Molton, Devon, England, was a Member of Parliament for Tiverton in Devon (1621) and for the prestigious county seat of Devon (1628-9).

== Origins ==
Bampfield was the eldest son and heir of Sir Amias Bampfield (c. 1560 – c. 1626), MP, of Poltimore and North Molton, by his wife Elizabeth Clifton, who was a daughter of Sir John Clifton of Barrington Court, Somerset.

== Career ==
Bampfield matriculated at Exeter College, Oxford on 13 July 1604, aged 18. He was a law student at the Middle Temple in 1607. In 1621 he was elected a Member of Parliament for Tiverton, Devon. He was elected an MP for Devon in 1628 and sat until 1629, when King Charles I decided to rule without parliament for eleven years. In 1631 he founded almshouses in memory of his late wife.

== Marriage and children ==
In 1602 Bampfield married Elizabeth Drake, a daughter of Thomas Drake (d.1605) of Buckland Drake, Devon, and a niece of Admiral Sir Francis Drake (d.1596) of Buckland Abbey, Devon. This was part of a double union in which his sister, Jane Bampfield, married Francis Drake, who was a brother of Elizabeth Drake. Drake and Bampfield then attended Oxford together two years later. By his wife he had children, including:

- Amias Bampfylde, eldest son, who died in Italy without children.
- Arthur Bampfield, second son, died without children.
- Sir John Bampfylde, 1st Baronet (1610–1650), third son and heir apparent, one of Devon's Parliamentarian leaders during the Civil War, who predeceased his father. The heir to his baronetcy and paternal inheritance was his eldest son Sir Coplestone Bampfylde, 2nd Baronet (c. 1633 – 1692).
- Francis Bampfield (died 1663/4), sixth son, a Nonconformist minister who died in Newgate Prison.
- Thomas Bampfield (died 1693), eighth son, MP, briefly Speaker of the House of Commons.

== Sources ==
- Venning, Tim & Hunneyball, Paul, biography of Bampfield, John (c.1586-c.1657), of Poltimore, Devon published in The History of Parliament: the House of Commons 1604-1629, ed. Andrew Thrush and John P. Ferris, Cambridge University Press, 2010
- Vivian, Lt.Col. J.L., (Ed.) The Visitations of the County of Devon: Comprising the Heralds' Visitations of 1531, 1564 & 1620, Exeter, 1895, pp. 38–41, pedigree of Bamfield of Poltimore

Parliament of England
Constituency enfranchised 1615	Member of Parliament for Tiverton; 1621–1622; With: John Davie	Succeeded by Sir George Chudleigh; Humphrey Weare
Preceded by John Drake; John Pole	Member of Parliament for Devon; 1628–1629; With: Sir Francis Drake, 1st Baronet	Parliament suspended until 1640
