= Poltimore =

Village in Devon, England

Coordinates: 50.762735°N 3.468535°W

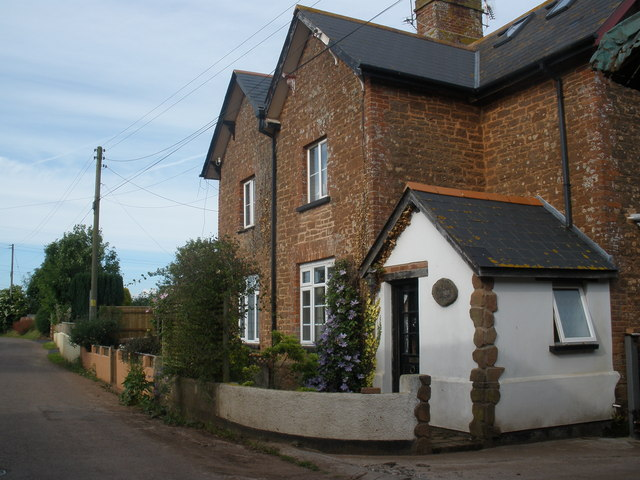
- Hayes Dairy Cottages

- Location within Devon
- Population: 297 (2011 Census)
- Civil parish: Poltimore
- District: East Devon
- Shire county: Devon
- Region: South West
- Country: England
- Sovereign state: United Kingdom
- Post town: EXETER
- Postcode district: EX4
- Dialling code: 01392
- Police: Devon and Cornwall
- Fire: Devon and Somerset
- Ambulance: South Western
- UK Parliament: Exmouth and Exeter East

Poltimore is a village, civil parish and former manor in the East Devon district, in the county of Devon, England. It lies approximately 5 miles (8.0 km) northeast of Exeter. The parish consisted of 122 households and a population of 297 people during the 2011 census. The parish also includes the hamlet of Ratsloe.

== History ==
Two manors were recorded at Poltimore in the Domesday Book completed 1086: the main one was owned by Haemeric (or Haimer) de Arcis, an officer in the army of William the Conqueror; and a smaller one, Cutton, belonging to the Canons of St. Mary at Rouen.

The name of the village itself likely comes from Old Welsh, Pwlltymawr, which translates to "The Pool by the Great House" (Pwyll: pool; Ty: house; Mawr: great). The de Pultymor family, who owned the Manor of Poltimore in the 13th century, also had a residence called Poltymore in Glamorgan, South Wales. The Devon village was also spelled Poltymore, and the family's name subsequently evolved to de Poltymore, de Poltimore and of Poltimore.

Historically Poltimore formed part of Wonford Hundred. The manor appeared c. 1303 and is the historic seat of the Bampfylde family. The baronetcy, created for Sir John Bampfylde, 1st Baronet in 1641, takes its name from the village. The manor was rebuilt into Poltimore House, likely by Sir Coplestone Bampfylde, 2nd Baronet (1636-1691). The date 1681 is carved on the stone gate at the main entrance to the house.

William Camden, in his 1610 book, Britain, or, a Chorographicall Description of the most flourishing Kingdomes, England, Scotland, and Ireland, makes mention of Poltimore as "the seat of that worshipfull and right antient family of Bampfield."

In 1641–1642, 75 adult males in Poltimore signed the Protestation returns.

The population was 250 people in 1801, 288 in 1887 and 298 in 1901.

== Government ==
The village is run by the Poltimore Parish Council. Council meetings are normally held on the fourth Monday of each month at the Poltimore Village Hall.

Poltimore falls within the East Devon District Council and the Exmouth and Exeter East Constituency.

== Transport ==
The village lies directly west of the M5 motorway.

== Church ==
Poltimore falls within Aylesbeare Deanery for ecclesiastical purposes. The village has one church, St. Mary's, which has Renaissance detail in the vaulting (c. 1520). The tomb with recumbent figures of Richard Bampfylde (d. 1594) and his wife, Elizabeth (d. 1599), is in the south transept.

The church was restored by architect Robert Medley Fulford from 1878 to 1884.

== Nearby places ==
- Brampford Speke
- Broadclyst
- Clyst Honiton
- Newton St Cyres
- Pinhoe
- Stoke Canon
- Upton Pyne

== See also ==
- Baron Poltimore
