= Warleigh, Bickleigh =

Historic estate in Devon, England

Coordinates: 50.4349°N 4.1744°W

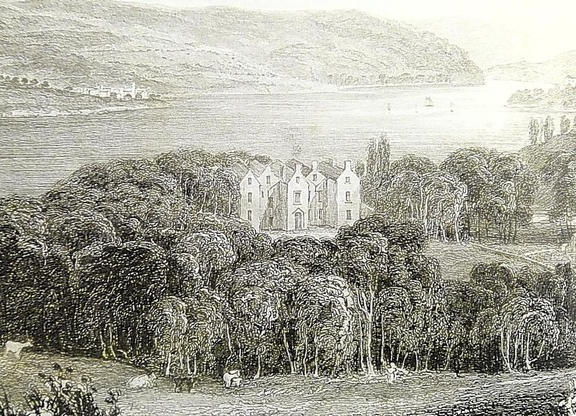
Engraving circa 1830 titled: "Warleigh House, Devonshire, the seat of Walter Radcliffe Esquire". View from south-east. This is the house then occupied and shortly before remodelled by Rev. Walter III Radcliffe.

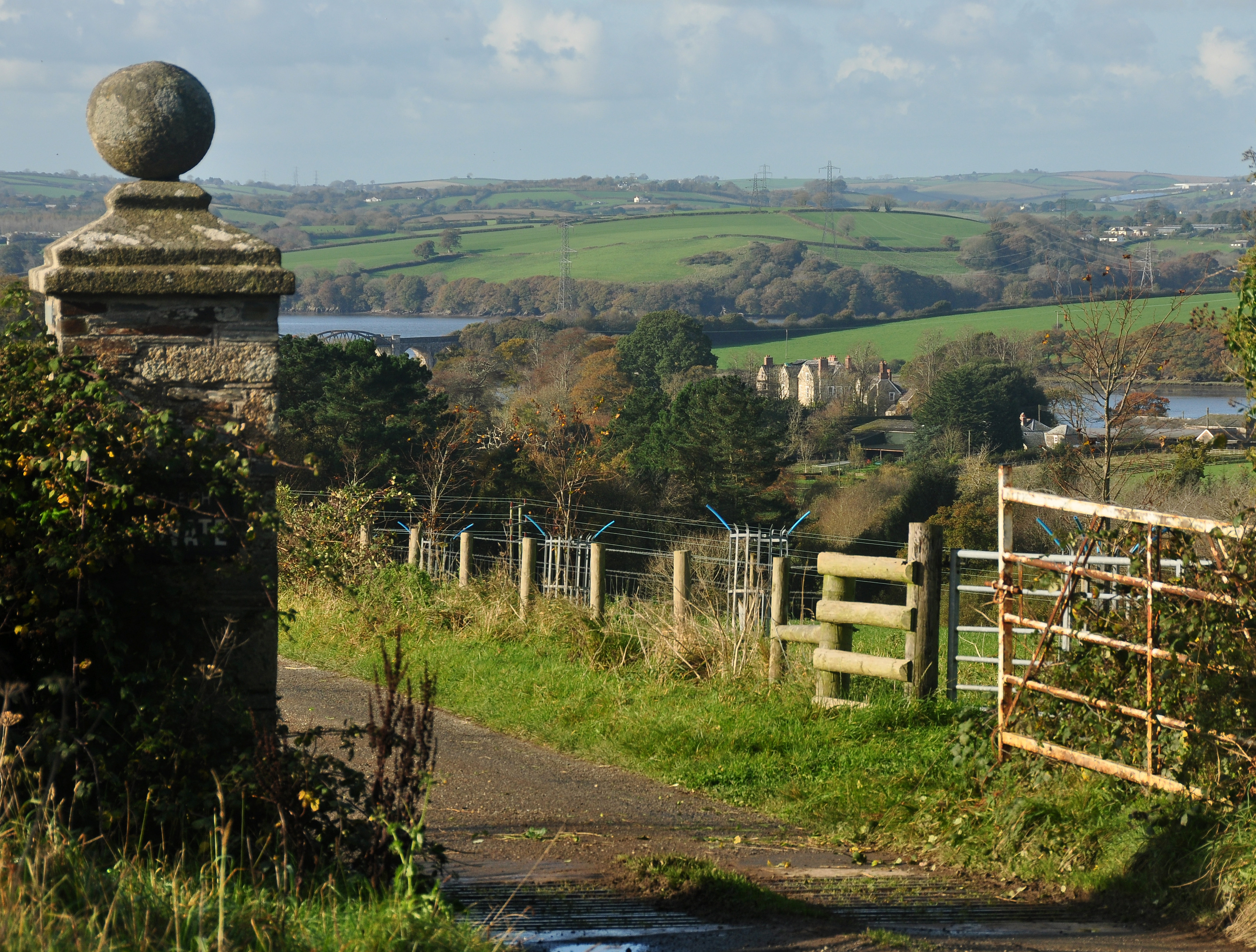
Warleigh House, view from entrance to carriage drive

Warleigh is a historic estate within the parish of Bickleigh (formerly Tamerton Foliot) in Devon, about 6 miles from Plymouth. Warleigh House, the manor house of the manor of Tamerton Foliot is situated one mile west of that village on the south-east bank of the River Tavy where it joins the River Tamar. It was remodelled in about 1830 in the Gothic style by John Foulston and has been listed Grade II* on the National Heritage List for England since 1960.

The boundary walls of the garden are made from red brick and date from the 18th century and are Grade II listed. The red brick dovecote to the east of the main house dates from the early 18th century and is Grade II listed. The boat house to the south west of the house was built c.1800 in the Gothic style, and is Grade II listed.

== Descent ==
=== Foliot ===
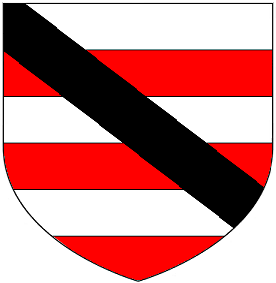
Arms of Foliot of Warleigh: Barry argent and gules, a bend sable

During the reign of King Stephen (1135–1154) Warleigh and the manor of Tamerton were held by Sampson Foliot. Risdon states:

"(His) principal place of dwelling was at Warleigh within the same parish, a seat both pleasant and profitable, situated by the Tamer side, having a fair demesne and a park adjoining, wanting no necessaries that land or sea afford".

His descendant Robert Foliot is stated by Pole to have held Warleigh and Tamerton in 1242, during the reign of King Henry III, and to have left an only daughter and sole heiress Ellen Foliot, who married Sir Ralph de Gorges, to whose family passed the Foliot estates, including Warleigh, Tamerton Foliot and Tavy Foliot. Pole states elsewhere that during the reign of King Henry III a certain Sampson Folliot held the manor of Coffinswell, which later passed to the Coffin family.

=== Copleston ===
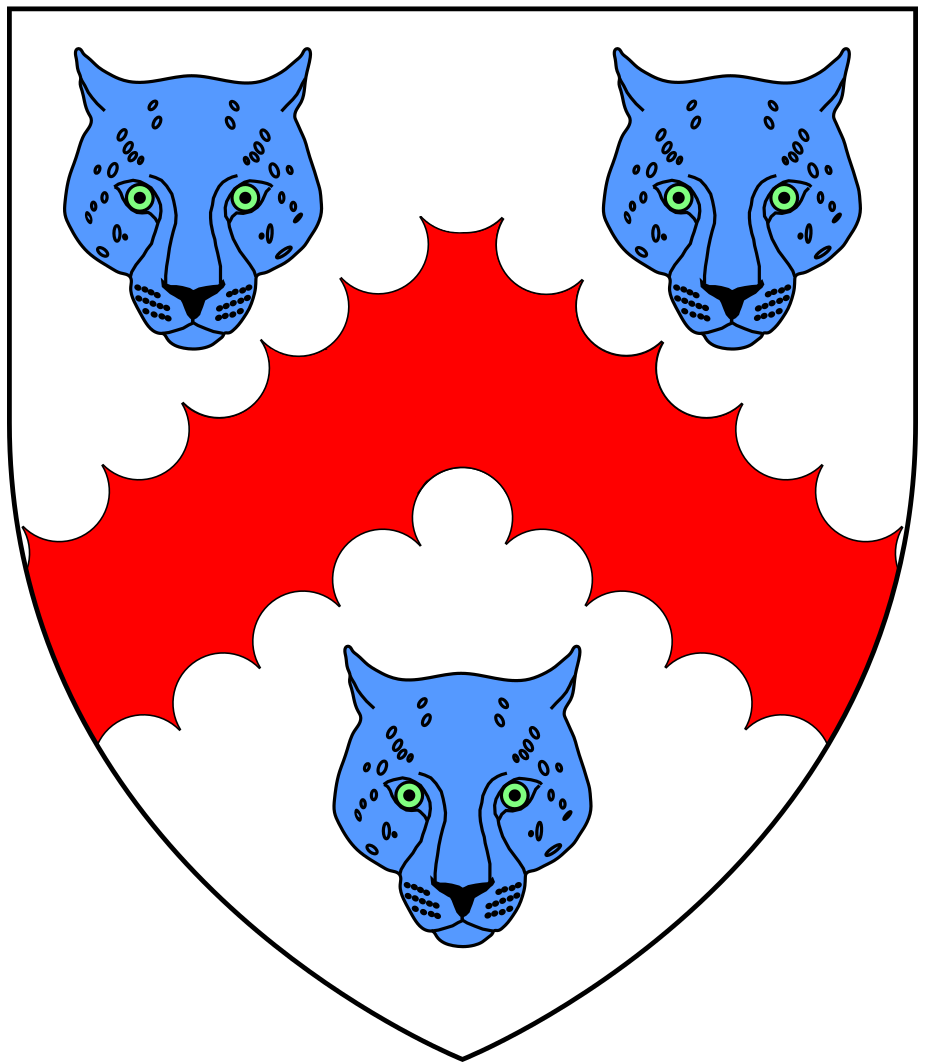
Arms of Copleston: Argent, a chevron engrailed gules between three lion's faces azure

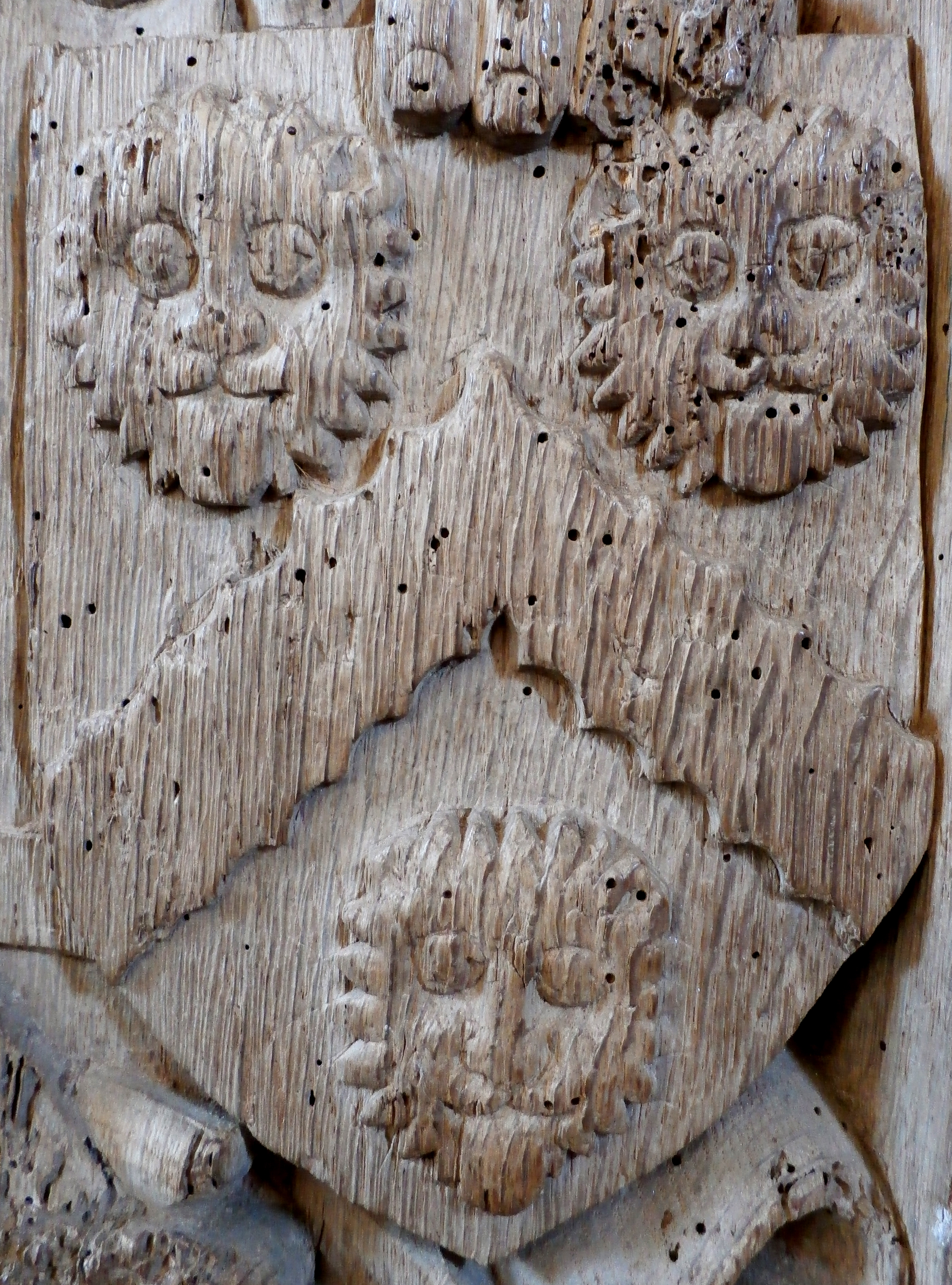
Arms of Copleston, detail from 15th century Copleston Prayer Desk in St Andrew's Church, Colebrooke

The Devon historian Tristram Risdon (d. 1640) wrote concerning the Coplestons:

"A numerous family who for their fair possessions, their port (sic) (report?) and the respect they lived in, were intitled 'the Great Coplestones' besides dignified with the name of 'Whit Spurrs', some time a title of great note and in these western parts of much esteem. Of this name are many branches sprung who flourished in this county"

The Devon historian Sir William Pole (d. 1635) stated the honour accorded to this family as "Silver Spurr", similar to Risdon's appellation, and added that it was connected to the fact that although they were a great county family which had married well, unusually no member of the family had ever been knighted. For his great revenue one member of the family, Raphe Copleston (d. 1491), was called 'The Great Copleston'. The principal junior branches of the Copleston family were seated at the Devon manors or estates of: Bowden in the parish of Yealmpton, Instow, Upton Pyne, Kingdon in the parish of Alverdiscott, Woodland in the parish of Little Torrington, Weare Giffard, Eggesford and Bicton. Copleston House was stated by Prince (d. 1723) to be "all in ruines". The present Copplestone House, situated about 1/2-mile south-east of Copplestone Cross, was rebuilt after 1787 in the Georgian style by Robert Madge, who had purchased the estate at that date. It is thought to be on a different site to the old mansion of the Copleston family, but does incorporate some of the older fabric.

For the descent of the senior family seated at Copleston see article Manor of Copleston.

==== Philip Copleston (fl. 1472) ====
Philip Copleston of Copleston, was Sheriff of Devon in 1471/2. He married Anne Bonville, daughter and heiress of John Bonville (1417–1494) of Shute, nephew of the Devonshire magnate William Bonville, 1st Baron Bonville (1392–1461) of Shute. As Pole stated: "By this match of Bonvile's daughter the estate of Copleston was greatly augmented" Anne Bonville was heiress, from her maternal grandmother Leva Gorges, to the manor of Tamerton Foliot and her father John Bonville was, through his mother, the grandson and heir of Martin Ferrers.

==== Raphe Copleston (d. 1491) ====
Raphe Copleston (d. 1491) (son), according to Vivian (1895) called "The Great Copleston", on account of his great revenues. He married Ellen Arundell, daughter of Sir John Arundell of Lanherne, St. Mawgan-in-Pyder, Cornwall, from a leading Cornish family. In the Subsidy of 1434 his estate of Copleston was assessed at £100 and he served in the honourable position of Justice of the Peace in 1451.

==== John III Copleston (1475–1550) ====
John III Copleston (1475–1550) (son) of Copleston, "The Great Copleston" according to Prince (d. 1723). He was co-heir of his great-grandfather John Bonville. His monument survives in Colebrooke Church. He married twice, firstly to Margaret St Ledger, daughter and co-heiress of Bartholomew St Ledger, which marriage was childless; secondly he married Katherine Bridges, daughter of Raphe Bridges.

==== Christopher Copleston (1524–1586) ====
Christopher Copleston (1524–1586) (son by his father's 2nd marriage) of Copleston, Sheriff of Devon in 1560. He married twice: firstly to Mary Courtenay, daughter of George Courtenay (who predeceased his father Sir William III Courtenay (1477–1535) "The Great" of Powderham), which marriage was childless; secondly he married Jone Paulet, daughter of Sir Hugh Paulet (pre-1510–1573) of Hinton St George, Somerset, Governor of Jersey.

==== John IV Copleston (1546/9–1608) ====
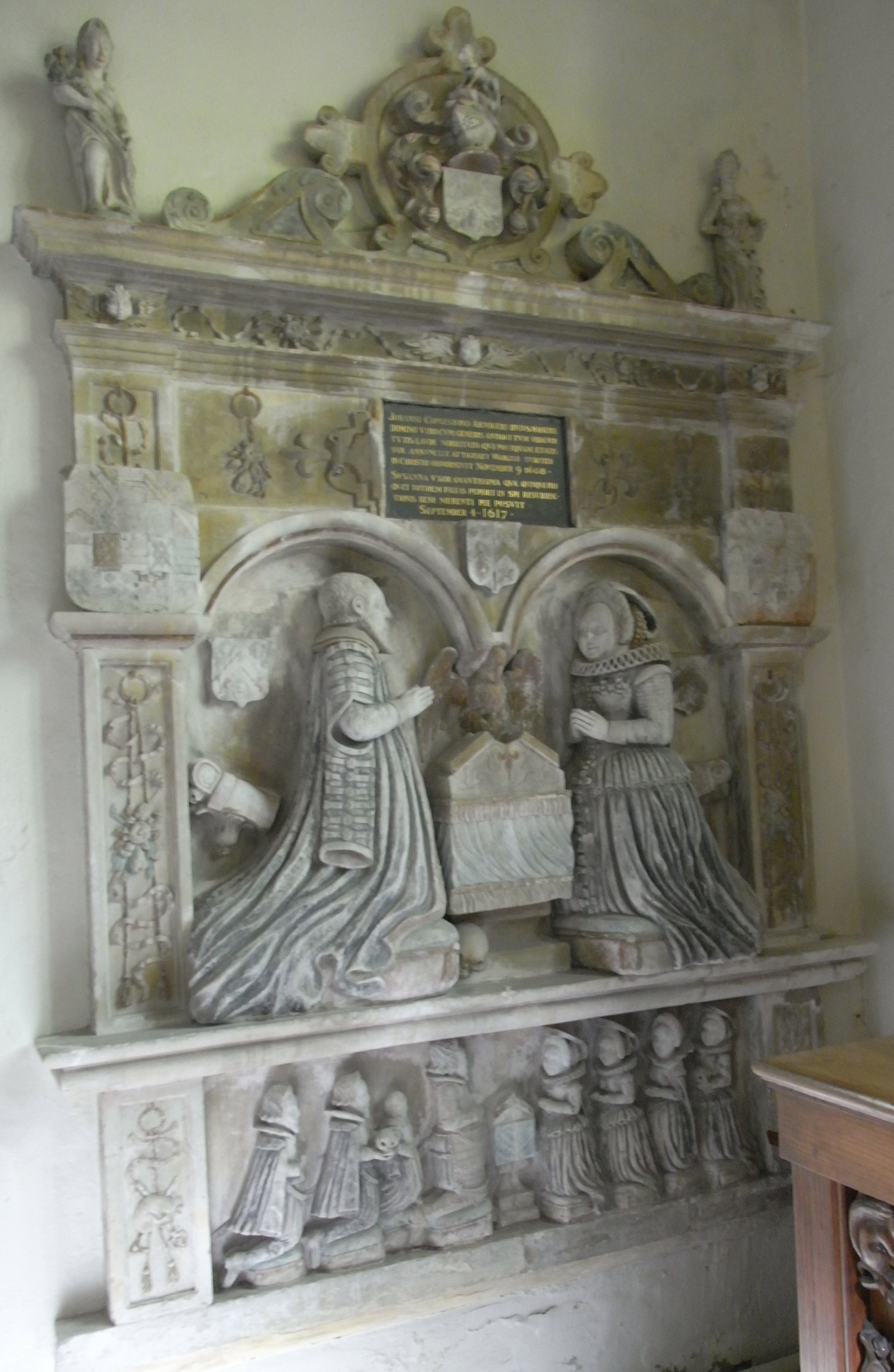
Monument to John Copleston (d. 1608) and his wife Susanna Pollard. St Mary's Church, Tamerton Foliot, north wall of chancel.

John IV Copleston (1546/9–1608) (2nd son and heir, by father's 2nd marriage) of Copleston and Warleigh, who married Susan Pollard, a daughter of Lewis II Pollard (d. pre-1569) of King's Nympton, Recorder of Exeter and Sergeant-at-Law, grandson of Sir Lewis I Pollard (c. 1465–1526), Justice of the Common Pleas. The couple's monument, erected in 1617 and repaired in 1894, survives in St Mary's Church, Tamerton Foliot, inscribed in Latin as follows:

Johanni Coplestono Armigero huius manerie domino viro cum generis antiqui tum verae virtutis laude nobilitato: qui postquam aetatis suae annum LIX attigisset Warleiae suaviter in Christo obdormirvit, 9 November 1608. Susanna uxor amantissima quae quinque filios et totidem filias peperit in spe resurrectionis bene merenti pie posuit, 4 September 1617 ("To John Copleston, Esquire, lord of this manor, a man famed as greatly for true virtue as noble descent, who after he had reached his 59th year went to sleep gently in Christ at Warleigh, November 9, 1608. Susanna his most beloved wife who brought forth five sons and as many daughters placed this piously in well deserved hope of resurrection, September 4, 1617")

===== Murder of godson =====
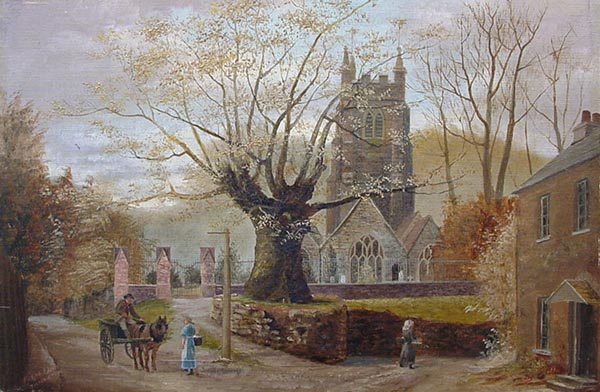
"Fatal Oak", oil painting circa 1900 by "S.G.M.", depicting the Copleston Oak next to St Mary's Church, Tamerton Foliot, next to which the murder occurred

As related by Prince, John IV Copleston murdered his godson, possibly an illegitimate son, which "most unfortunate occurrence in this place of Tamerton...in all probability hastened the extinction of the name and family here and at Copleston also". The godson had been sent abroad for his education and when he returned home to England overheard his godfather's private conversation and reported it amongst his circle of friends, which action soon found its way by gossip back to his godfather, whose indignation was "exceedingly enkindled" and who exclaimed: "Must boys observe and discant on the actions of men and of their betters?", and thenceforth resolved and sought all opportunities to be revenged upon him. The two next met at Tamerton Foliot church during the Sunday service, and the youth fled before the end of the service, having noticed his godfather's angry look. Having received a message from his godfather that his anger was over and that he could return to church, the youth appeared at church the next week at the usual time. However Copleston's rage was not over, and although the youth had again fled before the end of the service, Copleston followed him and threw a dagger into his back, which killed him instantly. Copleston fled, and implored all his influential friends at the royal court to procure him a pardon from Queen Elizabeth, which eventually he received, but not without having had to pay a large fine which necessitated the sale of thirteen of his manors in Cornwall. This story is related by Prince, who heard it from a gentleman who was a neighbour of the Coplestons.

==== Amias Copleston (1581/2–1621) ====
Amias Copleston (1581/2–1621) (son) of Copleston and Warleigh. He was buried at Tamerton Foliot, the manor his ancestors had inherited by marriage to Anne Bonville. He resided at the former Gorges seat of Warleigh within that manor, and thus possibly had abandoned ancient Copleston as the family's principal seat. He married Gertrude Chichester (d. 1621), 2nd daughter of Sir John Chichester (d. 1586), Sheriff of Devon, in 1576 son and heir of Sir John Chichester (1519/20–1569) of Raleigh, from a leading family in North Devon.

==== John V Copleston (1609–1632) ====
John V Copleston (1609–1632) (son), who died aged 23 without progeny and was buried at Tamerton Foliot. He was the last of the family of Copleston of Copleston and Warleigh and Risdon wrote of him: "The heir male of this house was a hopeful young gentleman, lately dying issueless, who left his lands unto his two sisters, married into the families of Bampfield and Elford". By these heirs the manor of Copleston was sold in 1659. His two sisters and co-heiresses were:

  - Elizabeth Copleston (born 1608), the elder sister, who married (as his 1st of 4 wives) John Elford (1603–1678) of Sheepstor, near Buckland Monachorum in Devon, whose ruined manor house survives on the shore of Burrator Reservoir. Elizabeth had no male issue, only four daughters, including:
    - Gertrude Elford, who married Roger Wollocombe of Combe
    - Elizabeth Elford, who married Edmund Fortescue of London
    - Barbara Elford, who married Arthur Fortescue (1622–1693) of Penwarne, Cornwall and of Filleigh, Devon, ancestor of Earl Fortescue

The manor of Copleston descended into the families of Wollocombe and Fortescue.

  - Gertrude Copleston (born 1611), the younger sister, who married in 1632 at Tamerton Foliot to Sir John Bampfylde, 1st Baronet (c. 1610–1650) of Poltimore, near Exeter and North Molton in Devon. She was the heiress of Warleigh and of the manor of Tamerton Foliot,

=== Bampfylde ===
Arms of Bampfylde, Bampfylde Baronets and after 1831 Barons Poltimore: Or, on a bend gules three mullets argent

==== Sir John Bampfylde, 1st Baronet (1590–1650) ====
Sir John Bampfylde, 1st Baronet (1590–1650), MP, of Poltimore and North Molton in Devon, married Gertrude Coplestone (d. 1658), a daughter of Amias Coplestone (1582–1621) and a co-heiress to her brother John V Coplestone (1609–1632), and inherited amongst other properties the manor of Tamerton Foliot, which thus passed into the Bampfylde family.

==== Sir Coplestone Bampfylde, 2nd Baronet (c. 1633–1692) ====
Sir Coplestone Bampfylde, 2nd Baronet (c. 1633–1692), eldest son, died of gout at Warleigh and was buried at Poltimore.

==== Sir Coplestone Bampfylde, 3rd Baronet (c. 1689–1727) ====
Sir Coplestone Bampfylde, 3rd Baronet (c. 1689–1727), (grandson, eldest son of Colonel Hugh Bampfylde (c. 1663–1691) (son and heir apparent of Sir Coplestone Bampfylde, 2nd Baronet (c. 1633–1692), whom he predeceased) by his wife Mary Clifford, daughter of James Clifford of Ware. He was a High Tory Member of Parliament for Exeter (1710–1713) and for Devon (1713–1727). As well as having inherited his grandfather's extensive Devonshire estates, including Poltimore and North Molton, he also inherited the estates of his distant cousin Warwick Bampfylde (1623–1695) of Hardington, Somerset (5th in descent from Peter Bampfylde of Hardington, younger brother of Sir William I Bampfylde (d. 1474) of Poltimore), to whom he acted as executor. He married Gertrude Carew, daughter of Sir John Carew, 3rd Baronet (d. 1692) of Antony, Cornwall.

==== Sir Richard Warwick Bampfylde, 4th Baronet (1722–1767) ====
Sir Richard Warwick Bampfylde, 4th Baronet (1722–1767), only son and heir, MP for Exeter (1743–1747) and for Devonshire (1747–1776). He married Jane Codrington (d. 1789), daughter and heiress of Colonel John Codrington of Wraxhall, Somerset. In 1741 he sold the manor of Tamerton Foliot, with its manor house of Warleigh, to the husband of his cousin Admonition Bastard, namely to Walter Radcliffe, son of Walter Radcliffe of Frankland, Sheriff of Devon in 1696. His remaining seats were Copleston and Poltimore in Devon and Hardington in Somerset.

=== Radcliffe ===
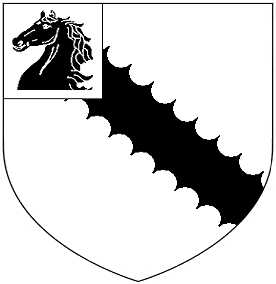
Arms of Radcliffe of Warleigh: Argent, a bend engrailed sable a canton of the first charged with a horse's head sable

The first member of the Radcliffe family (later of Warleigh) to be recorded is John Radcliffe (d. 1560) of Kingset and Mary Tavy, Devon, a tenant-in-chief of Queen Elizabeth I. The arms of Radcliffe of Warleigh were: Argent, a bend engrailed sable a canton of the first charged with a horse's head sable. These arms, without the canton, were the arms of Robert Radcliffe, 1st Earl of Sussex (c.1483–1542), KG and also of the Radcliffe Baronets (created 1813). The family of de Radclyffe which first bore these arms originated at the manor of Radcliffe in Lancashire. Richard de Radclyffe was Seneschal and Minister of the Royal forests in Blackburnshire and accompanied King Edward I (1272–1307) in his wars in Scotland and received from him a grant of free warren in all his demesne lands at Radcliffe. The descent of the Radcliffe family of Warleigh was as follows:

==== Walter I Radcliffe (1693–1752) ====
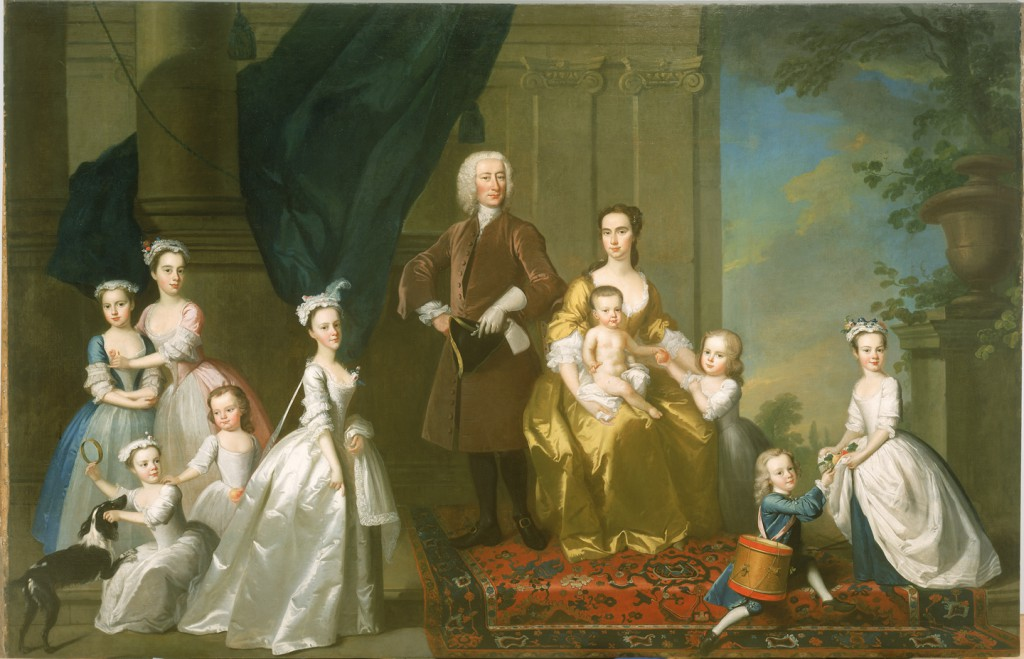
The Radcliffe family: Walter Radcliffe of Warleigh, Devon, his wife Admonition and their family, portrait circa 1742 by Thomas Hudson (1701–79). Berger Collection, Denver Art Museum; sold in 1996 by the Radcliffe Chattels Settlement

In 1741 the estate was purchased by Walter I Radcliffe (1693–1752) of Franklin, Devon, baptised at St Thomas's near Exeter, whose wife Admonition Bastard (born 1701) (4th daughter of William Bastard (1667–1704) of Gerston, East Alvington, Devon, by his wife Anne Pollexfen, daughter and heiress of Edmund Pollexfen of Kitley, Yealmpton, Devon) was a great-granddaughter of Gertrude Copleston (d. 1658), the heiress of Warleigh, being a granddaughter of Sir William Bastard (d. 1690), of Gerston, MP for Bere Alston, Devon (1678–1679), by his wife Grace Bampfylde, a daughter of Sir John Bampfylde, 1st Baronet (1590–1650) by his wife Gertrude Copleston (d. 1658), heiress of Warleigh. Walter I Radcliffe was the third son and (following the deaths of his two elder unmarried brothers) eventual heir of Jasper II Radcliffe (d. 1704) of Hockworthy Court, Hockworthy, and Franklyn, Devon, Sheriff of Devon in 1696, by his wife Jane Andrews, daughter of Solomon Andrews of Lyme Regis, Dorset. A very large oil painting by Thomas Hudson (1701–79) titled The Radcliffe family: Walter Radcliffe of Warleigh, Devon, his wife Admonition and their family, property of the Berger Collection founded by the mutual funds manager William Merriam Bart Berger (d. 1999) of Denver, Colorado, USA, is on display in the Denver Art Museum, formerly displayed in the Assembly Rooms, Bath, Somerset, and on occasion at nearby Dyrham Park. It depicts Walter I Radcliffe with his wife and nine children. It measures 126 inches by 174 inches (10 ft 6" high by 14 ft 6" wide) and is one of Hudson's largest works, rivalling in size the swagger portrait of Viscount Courtenay and his family in the dining room of Powderham Castle. It was sold in 1996 by the Radcliffe Chattels Settlement.

==== Walter II Radcliffe (1733–1803) ====
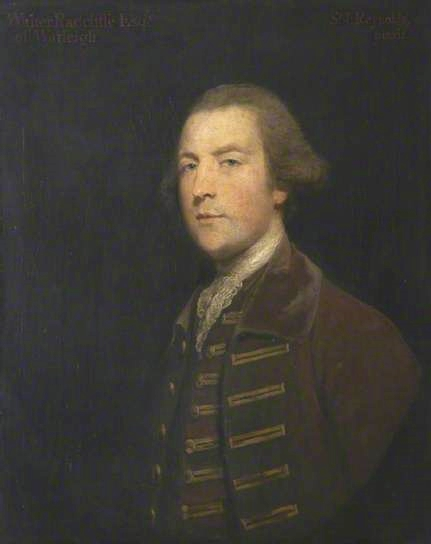
Portrait circa 1757/8 of Walter II Radcliffe (1733–1803) of Warleigh by Sir Joshua Reynolds (1723–1792), Collection of National Trust, Saltram House, Devon. John Parker, 1st Baron Boringdon (1734/5–1788) of Saltram, near Warleigh, was a childhood friend of Reynolds, born nearby, and commissioned him to paint several portraits of his friends and family. A view of the river and Warleigh House are depicted to the left, revealed by a drawn back curtain.

Walter II Radcliffe (1733–1803) (second surviving son and heir), of Warleigh, who died unmarried. He was the typical eighteenth-century gentleman, and made a Grand Tour of Europe, maintained a house in London, and was twice painted by Sir Joshua Reynolds.

==== John Radcliffe (1735–1805) ====
John Radcliffe (1735–1805) (younger brother), of Warleigh, whose heir was his nephew Rev. Walter III Radcliffe. He was predeceased by three younger brothers, including William Radcliffe (d. 1760) who was killed in action at the Battle of Warburg in Westphalia, during the Seven Years' War.

==== Rev. Walter III Radcliffe ====
Rev. Walter III Radcliffe (1779–1867), nephew. He was the son of Rev. Copleston Radcliffe (6th son of Walter I Radcliffe (1693–175..)), Rector of Stoke Climsland, Cornwall and Vicar of Tamerton Foliot, by his wife Sarah Peter, daughter of Samuel Peter of Percothan, Cornwall. In 1812 he married Abby-Emma Franco, daughter of Abraham Franco and sister of Sir Ralph Lopes, 2nd Baronet (1788–1854) (born "Ralph Franco") of Maristow, near Tamerton Foliot. Ralph Franco, whose mother was Esther Lopes, was heir to his uncle Sir Manasseh Masseh Lopes, 1st Baronet, MP and patron of the Rotten Borough of Westbury, from a wealthy family of Sephardic-Jewish Portuguese origin, who had converted to Christianity in 1802. His baronetcy had been created in 1805, with a special remainder to his nephew Ralph Franco. Between 1825 and 1832 Rev. Walter Radcliffe remodelled the house in the Gothic style to the designs of the architect John Foulston(1772–1841). By his wife Abby-Emma Franco he left the following progeny, three sons and three daughters:

- Walter IV Copleston Radcliffe (1815–1876), eldest son and heir.
- Copleston Lopes Radcliffe (1818–1883), of Derriford, near Plymouth, who in 1832 purchased Plympton House in the parish of Plympton St Maurice, Devon.
- Col. Sir William Pollexfen Radcliffe, KCB, of Mortimer House, Berkshire
- Sarah Lydia Radcliffe
- Charlotte Hester Radcliffe
- Emma Admonition Radcliffe, wife of Rev. John Hall Parlby of Manadon, Plymouth.

==== Walter IV Copleston Radcliffe (1815–1876) ====
Walter Copleston Radcliffe (1815–1876), JP, of Warleigh, eldest son and heir. His 5th son was Jasper FitzGerald Radcliffe (1867–1916), DSO, Lieutenant-Colonel of the Devon Regiment, killed in action in World War I.

==== Walter V John Deacon Radcliffe (1858–1930) ====
Walter John Deacon Radcliffe (1858–1930), eldest surviving son, of Warleigh, JP. A Barrister of the Inner Temple.

==== Walter VI Henry Radcliffe (1893–post 1937) ====
Walter Henry Radcliffe (1893–post 1937), eldest son and heir, of Warleigh. Captain of the Devonshire Regiment in 1927, fought in World War I. In 1937 he had a daughter Joanna Katharine Radcliffe (born 1932)

== 20th century ==
In 1960 Warleigh House was used as a nursing home. In 1986 the Radcliffe family continued to reside at a nearby estate.

=== Piper ===
The house and 111 acres of land was purchased in 1998 by David Piper (1950–2014), a property developer and hotel owner, who having been twice divorced, in 2002 placed an advertisement for a wife in the International Herald Tribune newspaper, which brought him to international prominence having been the subject of 1,000 newspaper articles and 20 hours of television and radio broadcasting. The advertisement was as follows:

"Eccentric Lord of the Manor, 52, seeks attractive 25–35 year old entrepreneurial, intelligent, professional of independent means to become his Lady of Warleigh. Mutual interests should include a catholic taste in music, the arts, travel adventure, English humour and fun".

He told the BBC that he had received replies from Frankfurt, Munich, Verona, Strasbourg, Denmark, Somalia and Niger, but said "What I would really like is someone from South East Asia; I happen to like that part of the world". In 2002 he offered the 10 bedroomed house with 20 acres for sale for £2.5 million, including the circular dovecote and boathouse. In 2008 after having been diagnosed with prostate cancer he offered the estate for sale for £2 million and also all his remaining personal assets and possessions he offered for sale on eBay to cover debts of £2.3 million. He died on 31 March 2014.

=== Clayton ===
In 2014 Warleigh House was refurbished and briefly operated as a three-bedroom luxury hotel by its owner Kris Clayton. Finally, in 2015, it was returned its original purpose as a private residence.

=== Kilroy-Silk ===
Warleigh House has been owned by Robert Kilroy-Silk and Jan Kilroy-Silk since 2015.

== Sources ==
- Pevsner, Nikolaus & Cherry, Bridget, The Buildings of England: Devon, London, 2004, p. 889, Warleigh House
