= Thomas Bampfield =

English politician (died 1693)

Thomas Bampfield MP, JP
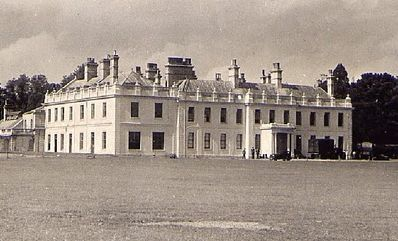
- Poltimore House, the family home

Member of Parliament for Exeter
- In office 1654–1660

Speaker of the House of Commons
- In office April 1659 – April 1659

Recorder of Exeter
- In office 1654–1660

Personal details
- Born: c. 1623 Poltimore House
- Died: 8 October 1693 (aged 70) Exeter
- Resting place: St Stephen's Church, Exeter
- Relations: Sir John Bampfylde (1610-1650); Francis Bampfield (1615-1683)
- Parent(s): John Bampfield (1586-1657); Elizabeth Drake (1592-1631)
- Education: Exeter College, Oxford
- Occupation: Lawyer and politician

Thomas Bampfield (Note: Also spelt Bampfylde) (c. 1623 – 8 October 1693) was a lawyer from Devon. A supporter of Parliament during the Wars of the Three Kingdoms, he sat as MP for Exeter between 1654 and 1660. For a short period in 1659, he was Speaker of the House of Commons in the Third Protectorate Parliament. After the 1660 Stuart Restoration, he retired from active politics in 1661.

A devout Presbyterian who was converted to Sabbatarianism by his older brother Francis Bampfield, he published a number of religious works before this death in October 1693.

== Personal details ==
Thomas Bampfield was the eighth son of John Bampfield of Poltimore and his wife Elizabeth. Like most of the Devon landed gentry, he and his brothers supported Parliament during the 1638 to 1651 Wars of the Three Kingdoms, although there is no record of his military service.

His elder brother Sir John Bampfylde, MP for Penryn until his death in 1650, was one of those excluded by Pride's Purge in December 1648. Another, Francis Bampfield (1615-1683), was a member of the Seventh Day Baptists, who spent nine years in prison for his religious convictions.

== Career ==
Bampfield attended Exeter College, Oxford, followed by legal training at Middle Temple in 1642, although the First English Civil War meant he did not qualify as a lawyer until 1649. In 1654, he was appointed Recorder of Exeter; combined with his Presbyterianism, holding this important legal position led to his election as Member of Parliament for Exeter in the First Protectorate Parliament. It is not clear whether he attended; like many others, he refused to accept Oliver Cromwell's insistence all MPs 'recognise' constitutional limits set out in the Instrument of Government.

In 1656, he was re-elected to the Second Protectorate Parliament, and chaired the Parliamentary committee that tried the Quaker activist James Nayler. He was also a prominent opponent of the 1657 Militia Bill, which sought to enshrine the much hated Rule of the Major Generals. In the Third Protectorate Parliament, he acted as Speaker from 14 April 1659 until it was dissolved on 22 April; he supported the re-seating of MPs excluded in Pride's Purge, and sat in the Convention Parliament that invited Charles II to resume the throne.

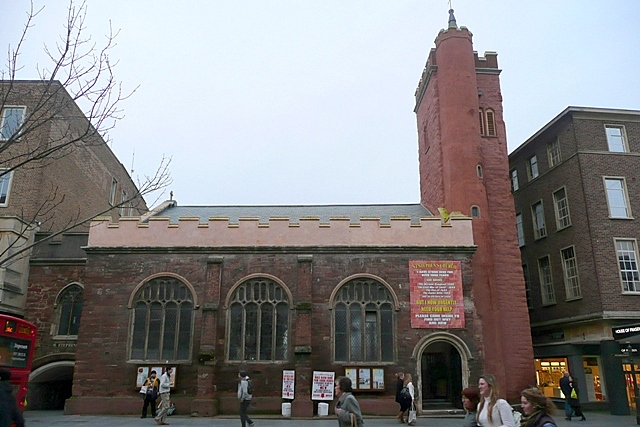
Bampfield was buried at St Stephen's, Exeter

Following the May 1660 Stuart Restoration, he helped draft a petition recommending clemency for the republicans John Lambert and Sir Henry Vane, as well as urging Charles to "marry a Protestant'. His opposition to the restoration of Episcopacy in the Church of England, and support for Puritan regulations prohibiting drunkenness and profanity, were out of step with the public mood. He lost his position as Recorder in October 1660, and did not stand again for election as an MP.

His brother Francis, a former Royalist and Prebendary of Exeter Cathedral, became an advocate of Sabbatarianism. Bampfield opposed the Act of Uniformity 1662, which evicted priests who refused to subscribe to the Thirty-nine Articles. They included his brother Francis, a former Royalist and Prebendary of Exeter Cathedral, who had become an advocate of Sabbatarianism, and converted Thomas. Francis spent the next nine years in prison, where he established a community of Seventh Day Baptists.

As a Nonconformist, Thomas was removed as a JP in 1665. He regained some of his former positions in 1688, when the Catholic James II was trying to win support for his policies from minority religious groups, then relinquished them after the Glorious Revolution. In retirement, he published several works on Sabbatarianism, which were reviewed by mathematician and theologian John Wallis, as well as Baptist minister Isaac Marlow. He died on 8 October 1693, and was buried at St Stephen's Church, Exeter.

== Published works ==
- "An Enquiry Whether the Lord Jesus Christ made the World, and be Jehovah, and gave the Moral Law? And Whether the Fourth Command be Repealed or Altered?"
- "A reply to Doctor Wallis"

== Sources ==
- Ball, Bryan (2009). The Seventh-day Men: Sabbatarians and Sabbatarianism in England and Wales, 1600-1800. James Clarke & Co. Ltd. ISBN 978-0227173114.
- Bell, Mark R (2004). Apocalypse How?: Baptist Movements During the English Revolution. Mercer Press. ISBN 978-0865546707.
- Greaves, Richard (1971). "Francis Bampfield (1615–1684): Eccentric Hebraist and Humanitarian". Bulletin of the Institute of Historical Research. 44 (110): 224–228. doi:10.1111/j.1468-2281.1971.tb02066.x.
- Greaves, Andrew (2004). "Bampfield, Francis (1614-1684)". Oxford Dictionary of National Biography (online ed.). Oxford University Press. doi:10.1093/ref:odnb/1258. (Subscription, Wikipedia Library access or UK public library membership required.)
- Helms, MW; Crossette, JS (1983). BAMPFIELD, Thomas (c.1623-93), of Exeter, Devon in The History of Parliament: the House of Commons 1660-1690 (Online ed.). Boydell & Brewer.
- Lay, Paul (2020). Providence Lost: The Rise and Fall of Cromwell's Protectorate. Head of Zeus. ISBN 978-1781852569.
- Plant, David. "The First Protectorate Parliament". BCW Project.
- Roberts, Stephen (2004). "Bampfield, Thomas". Oxford Dictionary of National Biography (online ed.). Oxford University Press. doi:10.1093/ref:odnb/1260. (Subscription, Wikipedia Library access or UK public library membership required.)

Political offices
Preceded by Lislebone Long	Speaker of the House of Commons; 1659	Succeeded by William Lenthall
