= Francis Bampfield =

17th-century Baptist divine

- Born: c. 1615; Poltimore House, Devon
- Died: 16 February 1684 (aged 68–69); Newgate Prison, London
- Citizenship: English
- Education: Wadham College, Oxford
- Spouse: Damaris Town (died 1694)
- Parent(s): John Bampfield (1586–1657); Elizabeth Drake (1592–1631)
- Relatives: Sir John Bampfylde (1610–1650); Thomas Bampfield (1623–1693)
- Religion: Protestant
- Church: Church of England to 1662; Seventh Day Baptists
- Ordained: 1638
- Offices held: Church of England; Rampisham 1639–1641; Exeter Cathedral 1641–1647; Wraxall, Somerset 1647–1653; Sherborne 1657–1662; Seventh Day Baptists

Francis Bampfield (c. 1615 – 16 February 1684) was an English Nonconformist preacher, and supporter of Saturday Sabbatarianism.

Born into a family of Devon gentry, he began as a conservative supporter of the Church of England, but gradually became more radical. He was expelled from the church following the 1662 Act of Uniformity, and became a Nonconformist; he spent nine years in prison, where he preached, and established congregations of Seventh Day Baptists.

After his release in 1672, he spent another 18 months in jail for preaching without an alliance, and moved to London in 1674, where he continued his activities. Arrested again in 1683, he refused on principle to swear the Oath of allegiance, and was sent to Newgate Prison, where he died of fever on 16 February 1684.

== Biography ==
Francis Bampfield was the third son of John Bampfield of Poltimore House, and his wife Elizabeth Drake.

His elder brother, Sir John Bampfylde (1610–1650), was Member of Parliament for Penryn, who was excluded from Parliament by Pride's Purge in December 1648. His younger brother, Thomas Bampfield (1623–1693), was MP for Exeter between 1654 and 1660, and Speaker of the Commons for a short period on 1659.

In September 1673, he married Damaris Town (died 1694); originally from Limerick, her father lost his estates in the 1641 Irish Revolt. They met when he was in Dorchester prison; after his release, she accompanied him on his preaching itineraries.

== Career ==
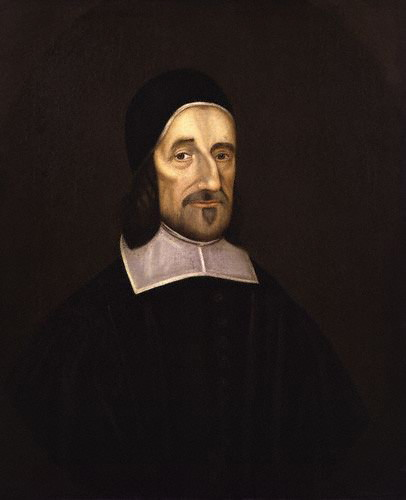
Bampfield's associate and mentor, Richard Baxter, the 'Puritan saint'

His parents intended him for a life in the church, and had him privately educated by 'pious families'; in 1631, he entered Wadham College, Oxford, where he earned two degrees, graduating in 1638. He reacted against his Puritan upbringing by supporting reforms to the Church of England made by Archbishop Laud. Ordained in 1639, he was appointed rector in the Devon village of Rampisham; provided with a private income from his father, he spent his stipend from this position on his parishioners. In May 1641, he was made a Prebendary of Exeter Cathedral.

Unlike most of his family, Francis supported the Royalists when the First English Civil War began in August 1642. He continued using the Book of Common Prayer, until forced to stop by Parliamentary troops; he later denounced it as an "unclean constitution of humanely invented worship".

In 1647, he moved to the parish of Wraxall, Somerset, and a few years later became an associate of Richard Baxter, a cleric known as the 'Puritan saint', and supporter of the Reformation of Manners. In line with its precepts, he tried to impose greater moral discipline on his parishioners, replacing games and other popular pastimes with religious study. He was removed from Wraxall in 1653, and began preaching at Sherborne; in 1657 he was installed in a service reportedly attended by over 2,000 people.

Following the 1660 Restoration, he was restored as prebendary, while Baxter recommended him for a bishopric. However, he was evicted from his living after the 1662 Act of Uniformity; he was arrested for preaching without a license, and spent most of the next nine years in Dorchester gaol.

While in prison, he became a convinced supporter of Saturday Sabbatarianism, and established a Seventh Day Baptist Church. After his release in 1672, he became an itinerant preacher, and was soon sentenced to another eighteen months in Salisbury jail. He moved to London in 1674, where he established several Sabbatarian Baptist congregations. However, he was unsuccessful in his wider ambition of building an international association to train ministers, educate children in Hebrew, and convert Jews.

In February 1683, he was arrested; although he had links to the Presbyterian radical Robert Ferguson, he was not involved in his conspiracies. Committed to court in March, he refused on principle to swear the Oath of allegiance, and was sent to Newgate Prison, where he died of fever on 16 February 1684. Large crowds of sympathisers attended his funeral at the Anabaptists' burial-ground in Aldersgate Street.

A contemporary noted he was 'first a churchman, then a Presbyterian, afterward an Independent, then an Anabaptist, and finally, almost a complete Jew.'

== Works ==
His works include:

- The Judgment of Mr. Francis Bampfield for the Observation of the Jewish or Seventh-day Sabbath, 1672.
- The Seventh-day Sabbath the Desirable Day, 1677.
- All in One: All Useful Sciences and Profitable Arts in the One Book of Jehovah Elohim, 1677.
- A Name, an After One, 1681.
- The House of Wisdom, 1681.
- The Lord's Free Prisoner, 1683.
- A Just Appeal from the Lower Courts on Earth to the Highest Court in Heaven, 1683.
- A Continuation of the former Just Appeal, 1683.
- The Holy Scripture the Scripture of Truth, 1684.

== Sources ==
- Ball, Bryan (1994). The Seventh-day Men: Sabbatarians and Sabbatarianism in England and Wales, 1600–1800. Clarendon Press. ISBN 978-0198267522.
- Bell, Mark R (2004). Apocalypse How?: Baptist Movements During the English Revolution. Mercer Press. ISBN 978-0865546707.
- Durso, Kevin (2007). No Armor for the Back: Baptist Prison Writings, 1600s-1700s. Mercer University Press. ISBN 978-0881460919.
- Greaves, Richard (1971). "Francis Bampfield (1615–1684): Eccentric Hebraist and Humanitarian". Bulletin of the Institute of Historical Research. 44 (110): 224–228. doi:10.1111/j.1468-2281.1971.tb02066.x.
- Greaves, Richard L (2004). "Bampfield, Francis". Oxford Dictionary of National Biography (online ed.). Oxford University Press. doi:10.1093/ref:odnb/1258. (Subscription, Wikipedia Library access or UK public library membership required.)
- Vivian, J.L., ed. (1895). The Visitations of the County of Devon: Comprising the Heralds' Visitations of 1531, 1564 & 1620. Exeter: H. S. Eland.
