= Sir John Bampfylde, 1st Baronet =

English lawyer and politician

Member of Parliament for Penryn
- In office November 1640 - ?

Personal details
- Born: c. 1610 England
- Died: April 1650 (aged 40)
- Spouse: Gertrude Coplestone (m. 1637)
- Children: 13
- Parent: John Bampfield (father)
- Relatives: Francis Drake (great-uncle); Amias Bampfield (grandfather); Francis Bampfield (brother); Thomas Bampfield (brother)
- Education: Wadham College, Oxford
- Occupation: Lawyer, politician
- Military career
- Allegiance: Royalists (initial); Parliamentarians (later)
- Commands: Devon Trained Bands Regiment
- Conflicts: English Civil War

Arms of Bampfylde: Or, on a bend gules three mullets argent

Sir John Bampfylde, 1st Baronet (c. 1610 – April 1650) of Poltimore and North Molton and Tamerton Foliot, all in Devon, was an English lawyer and politician. He was one of Devonshire's Parliamentarian leaders during the Civil War.

== Origins ==
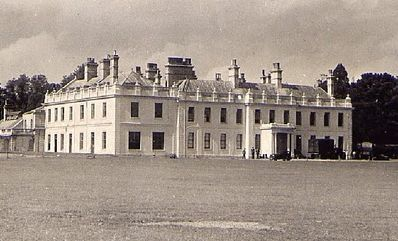
Poltimore House, seat of the Bampfylde family

Bampfylde was the third son of John Bampfield of Poltimore and North Molton in Devon, by his wife, Elizabeth Drake, daughter of Thomas Drake (d. 1610) of Buckland Drake, a brother of the great Admiral Sir Francis Drake (1546–1596). Over the 17th century the family's surname changed from Baumfield to Bamfield to Bampfield to Bampfylde.

== Education ==
He matriculated at Wadham College, Oxford on 30 October 1629, aged 19 and was a student of Middle Temple in 1630.

== Career ==
In November 1640 Bampfylde was elected a Member of Parliament for Penryn, Cornwall, in the Long Parliament. In the Civil War Bampfylde firstly allied himself with the Royalists, for which he was created a baronet, of Poltimore, in the County of Devon by King Charles I on 14 July 1641. He later sided with the Parliamentarian side, commanding a regiment of the Devon Trained Bands. He sat in the Long Parliament until 1648 when he was secluded under Pride's Purge.

== Marriage and children ==
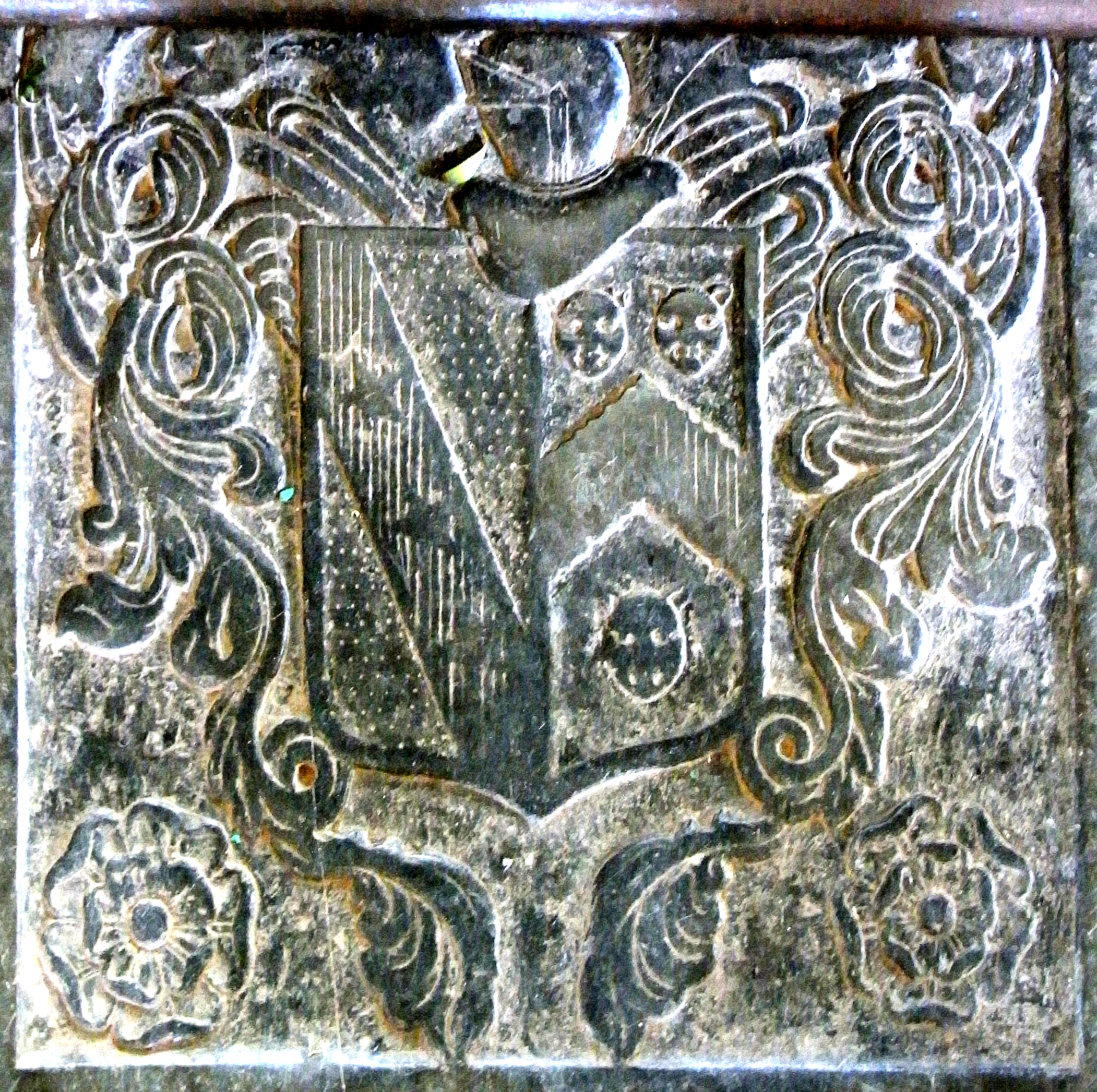
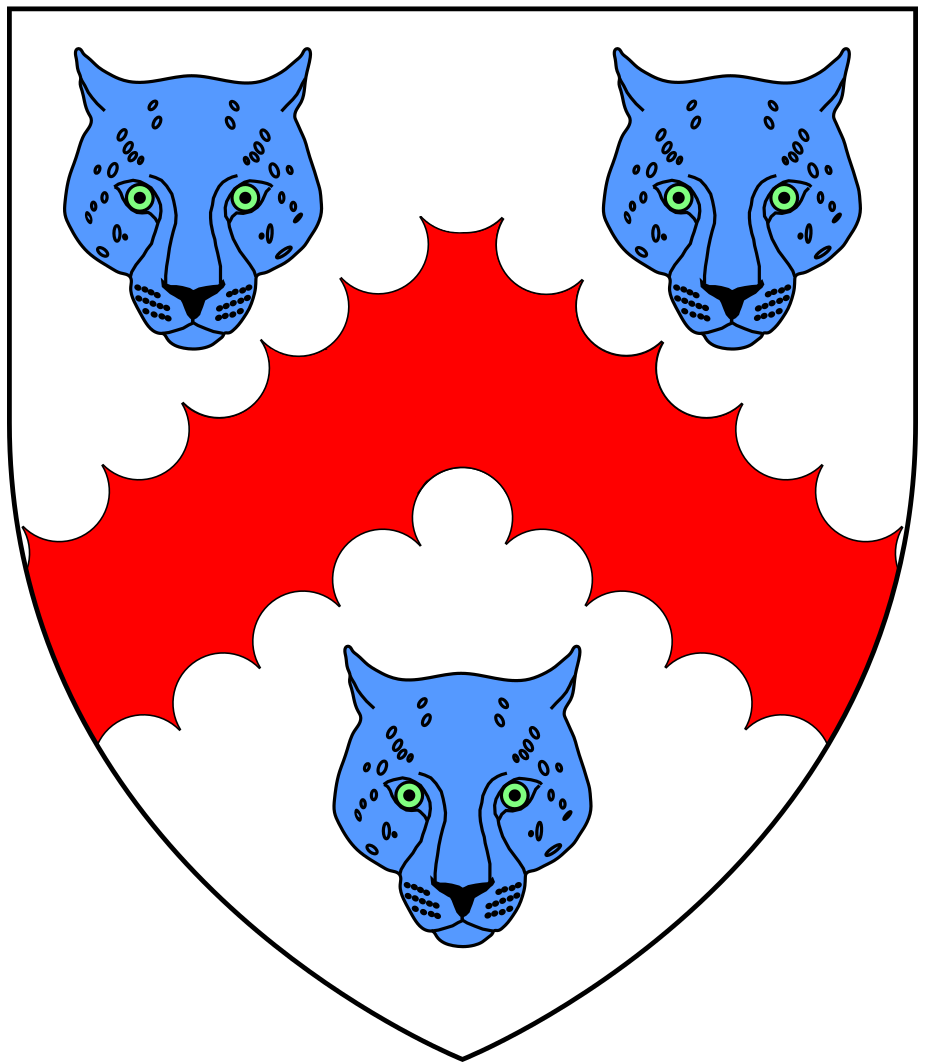
Left: Arms of Bampfylde impaling Coplestone (Argent, a chevron engrailed gules between three lion's faces azure) (as image at right), detail from the 1st Baronet's ledger stone in St Mary's Church, Poltimore

On 3 May 1637 Bampfylde married Gertrude Coplestone (d. 1658), a daughter of Amias Coplestone (1582–1621) of Copleston in the parish of Colebrooke and of Warleigh House in the parish of Tamerton Foliot, both in Devon. She was a co-heiress to her brother John V Coplestone (1609–1632), and inherited amongst other properties the manor of Tamerton Foliot, which thus passed into the Bampfylde family. The Bampfylde family used Warleigh House at Tamerton Foliot as a secondary seat. By Gertrude, he had thirteen children, eight daughters and five sons.

== Death and succession ==
Bampfylde was buried at Poltimore and was succeeded in the baronetcy by his eldest son Sir Coplestone Bampfylde, 2nd Baronet (c. 1633–1692), whose great-great-great grandson was George Bampfylde, 1st Baron Poltimore (1786–1858).

== Ledger Stone in Poltimore Church ==
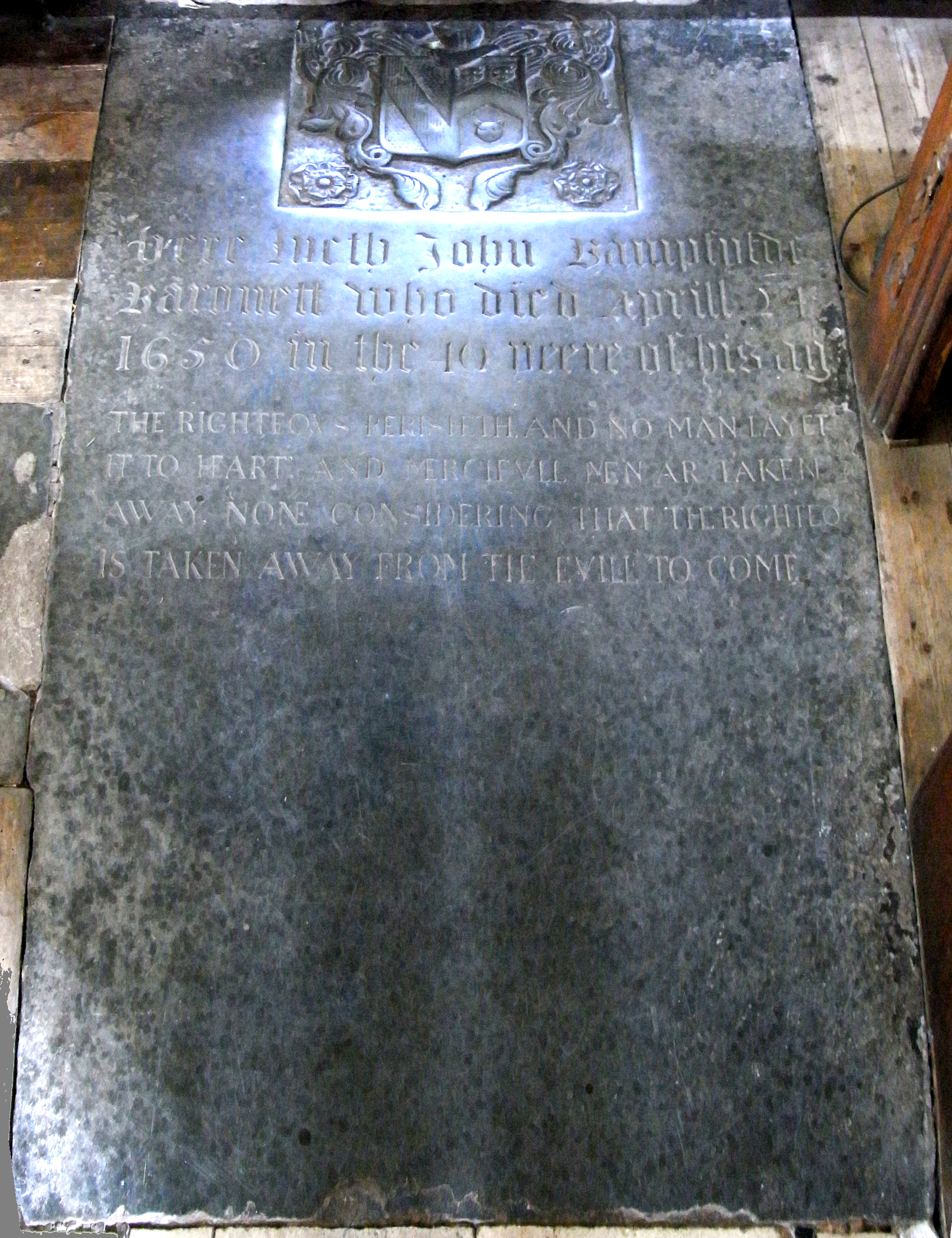
Ledger Stone of Sir John Bampfylde, 1st Baronet, in nave of Poltimore Church

His ledger stone survives, set into the floor of the nave of St Mary's Church, Poltimore, inscribed as follows:

"Here lyeth John Bampfylde Baronett who died Aprill 24 1650 in the 40 yeere of his ag^{e}. The righteous perisheth and no man layet^{h} it to heart and mercifull men ar taken away none considering that the righteo^{us} is taken away from the evill to come".

Above are shown the arms of Bampfylde impaling Copleston (Argent, a chevron engrailed gules between three lion's faces azure).

Baronetage of England
| New creation | Baronet (of Poltimore); 1641–1650 | Succeeded by Coplestone Bampfylde |
