= Wonford Hundred =

Ancient administrative unit of Devon, England

The hundred of Wonford was the name of one of 32 ancient administrative units of Devon, England.

The parishes in the hundred were:

- Alphington
- Brampford Speke
- Bridford
- Chagford
- Cheriton Bishop
- Christow
- Combeinteignhead
- Drewsteignton
- Dunsford
- East Ogwell
- The following Exeter parishes:
  - Allhallows Goldsmith St.
  - Allhallows on the Wall
  - Bedford Precinct
  - Cathedral
  - Heavitree
  - Holy Trinity
  - St David
  - St Edmund
  - St George
  - St John
  - St Kerrian
  - St Lawrence
  - St Leonard
  - St Martin
  - St Mary Arches
  - St Mary Major
  - St Mary Steps
  - St Olave
  - St Pancras
  - St Paul
  - St Petrock
  - St Sidwell
  - St Stephen
  - St Thomas the Apostle;
- Gidleigh
- Haccombe
- Hittisleigh
- Holcombe Burnell
- Huxham
- Pinhoe
- Poltimore
- Rewe (part)
- Shaldon
- South Tawton
- Sowton
- Spreyton
- Stoke Canon
- Stokeinteignhead
- Tedburn St Mary
- Throwleigh
- Topsham
- Upton Pyne
- West Ogwell
- Whitestone

== See also ==
- List of hundreds of England and Wales – Devon
- Wonford
