= Thomas Wotton (genealogist) =

Thomas Wotton (died 1766), was an English antiquarian and genealogist, best remembered for his work The English Baronetage (1727, 1741).

== Origins ==
Wotton was the son of Matthew Wotton, who kept a bookshop at the Three Daggers and Queen's Head, near St. Dunstan's Church, Fleet Street, London (where the 1741 edition of his Baronetage was published). According to John Dunton, the elder Wotton was "a very courteous, obliging man" of the highest character, whose trade "lay much among the lawyers". Thomas Wotton succeeded to his father's business and carried it on for many years, but had retired by the time of his death.

== Career ==
Wotton was Warden of the Stationers' Company in 1754 and Master in 1757. Among the works of others published by him were John Rushworth's Historical Collections and editions of the works of Francis Bacon and John Selden.

=== Works ===
==== English Baronetage, 1st Edition (1727) ====
In 1727 he issued in three small (16mo) volumes his English Baronetage. Being a Genealogical and Historical Account of their Families. It was dedicated to Holland Egerton of Heaton, Lancashire, son of Sir John Egerton, Baronet, of Wrine Hall, Staffordshire. William Holman of Halstead, Essex, and Thornhaugh Gurdon of Norfolk had placed their collections at his disposal and great assistance had been given by Arthur Collins, who himself had published a Baronetage in 1720. The work is divided into five sections, containing an account of the institution of the order by King James I, the descents, creations, successions, and public employments of the baronets; correct lists of existing and extinct baronets, exact tables of precedence, and an account of the institution of the order in Nova Scotia and Ireland. An explanatory index of terms in heraldry is appended. The baronets are listed by date of creation, not by alphabetical order.

==== English Baronetage, 2nd Edition (1741) ====
In 1741 Wotton published in five octavo volumes a revised and enlarged edition, which often is erroneously attributed to Collins. The title is The English Baronetage, Containing a Genealogical and Historical Account of all the English Baronets now Existing, their Descents, Marriages and Issues, Memorable Actions both in War and Peace, Religious and Charitable Donations, Deaths, Places of Burial and Monumental Inscriptions, etc.... In it were incorporated manuscript notes furnished by Robert Smyth, who had published a volume of corrections and additions. Peter Le Neve, who published three folio volumes on the same subject, also rendered valuable assistance to Wotton in preparing this edition. Letters, notes, and pedigrees furnished to Wotton for his Baronetage are in the British Library catalogued as British Museum Additional Manuscripts, 24114–21.

- The English Baronetage, Volume 1, 1741
- The English Baronetage, Volume 2, 1741
- The English Baronetage, Volume 3, 1741
- The English Baronetage, Volume 4, 1741
- The English Baronetage, Volume 5, 1741

==== English Baronetage, 3rd Edition (1771) ====
In 1771, after Wotton's death, a further edition of the Baronetage was issued in three volumes, under the editorship of Richard Johnson and Edward Kimber. The copy in the British Museum contains manuscript notes by Francis Hargrave. The arrangement of each edition is chronological.

- The English Baronetage, Volume 1, 1771
- The English Baronetage, Volume 2, 1771
- The English Baronetage, Volume 3, 1771

== Death ==
Wotton died at Point Pleasant, Surrey, on 1 April 1766.
