= St Stephen's Church, Exeter =

Church in Devon, England

Coordinates: 50.7240°N 3.5298°W

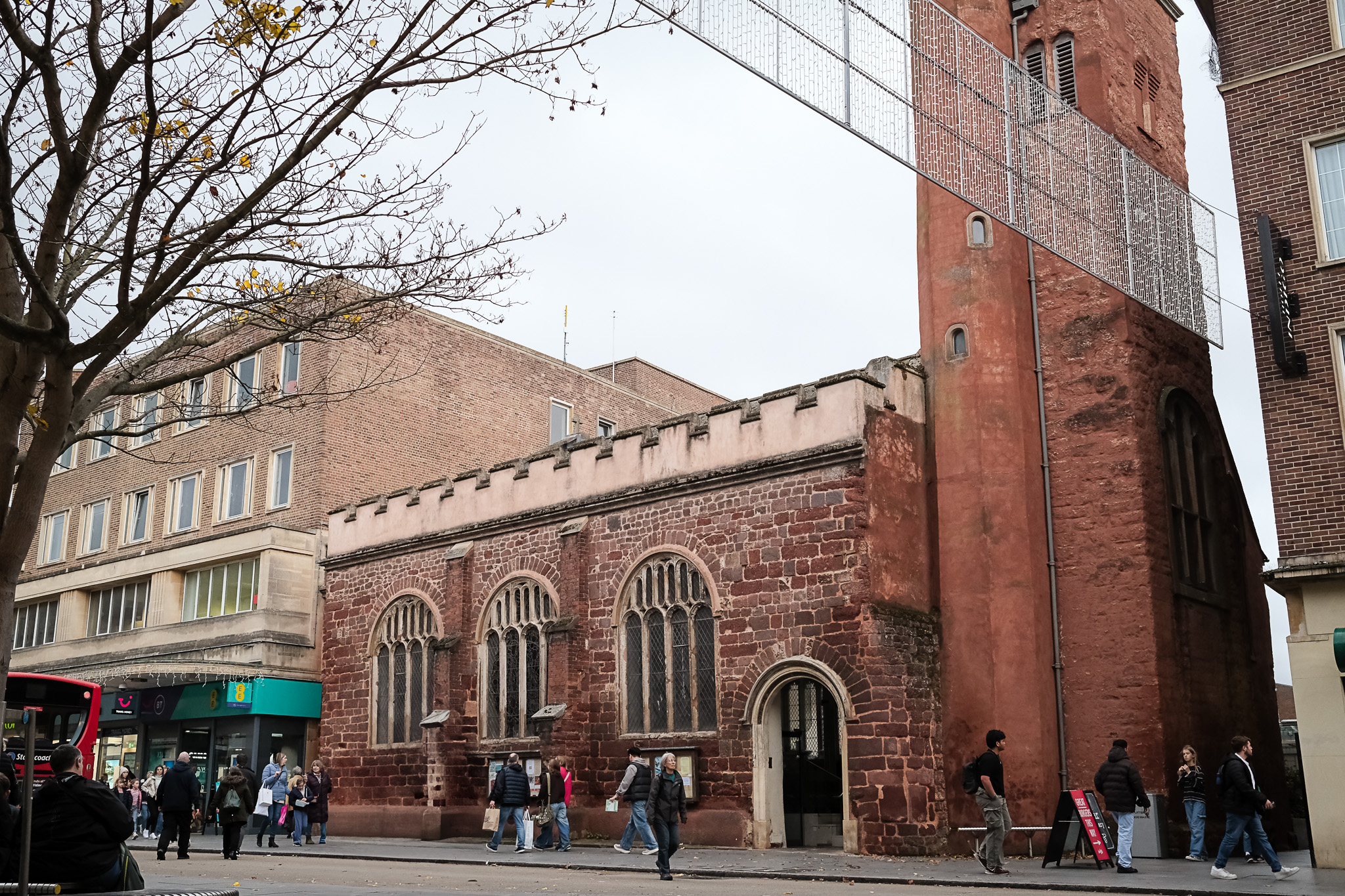
St Stephen's church, Exeter city centre

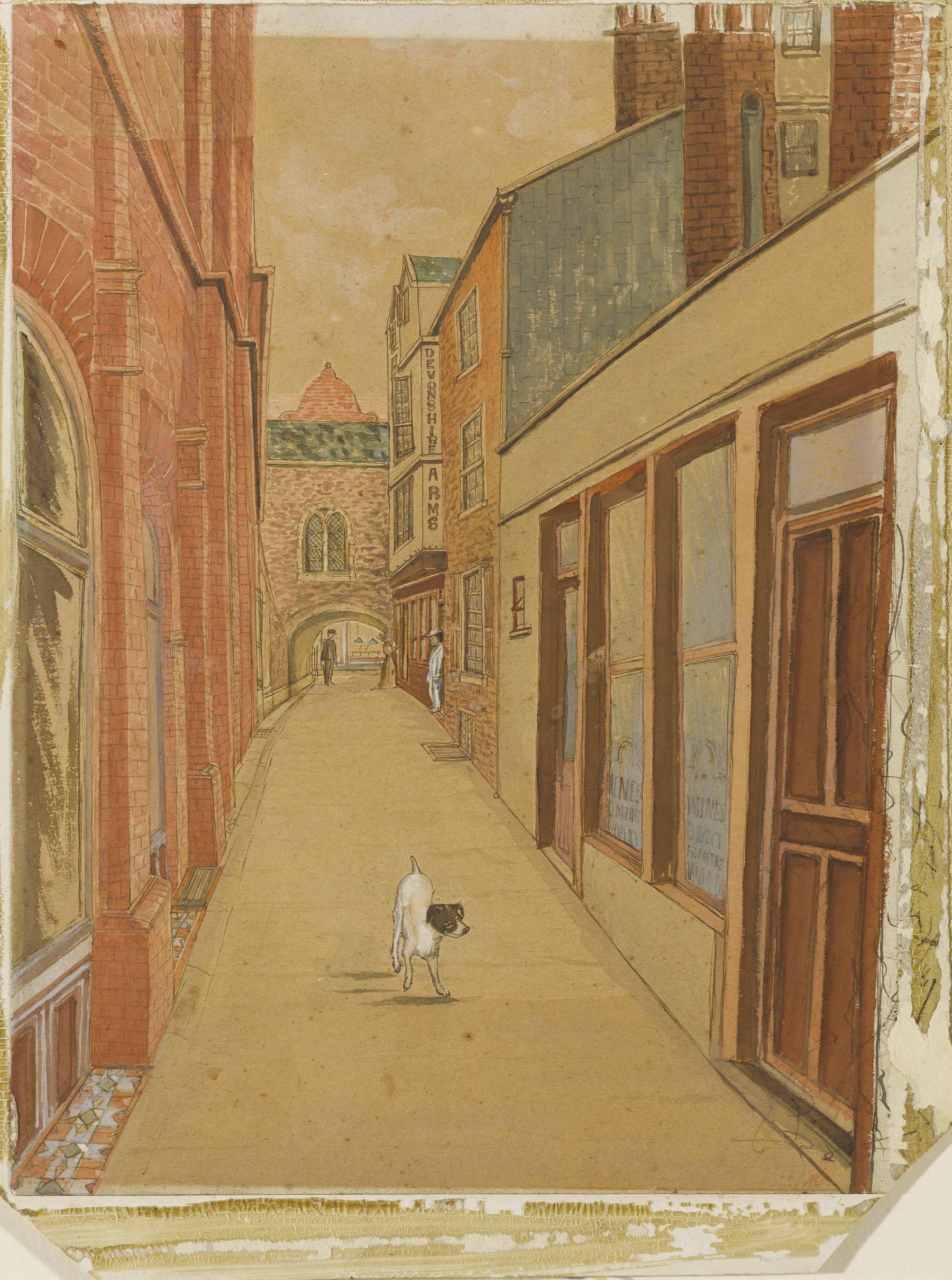
An anonymous watercolour of St Stephen's Bow and the Devonshire Arms c. 1900–1918 from the Royal Albert Memorial Museum's collection (62/1999).

St Stephen's Church is a small church in the centre of Exeter. It has a Saxon crypt but the first mention of the church is in the Domesday Book. Its location (now near the middle of the High Street) was formerly opposite the medieval guildhall. In July 2012 it reopened following a major renovation which cost £1.5 million.
