= Baron Poltimore =

Title in United Kingdom peerage

Arms of Bampfylde, Barons Poltimore: Or, on a bend gules three mullets argent

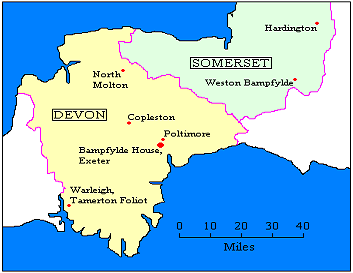
Seats of the Bampfylde family (Bampfylde Baronets and Barons Poltimore): In Devonshire: Poltimore; North Molton; Warleigh, Tamerton Foliot; Copleston, Colebrooke; Bampfylde House, Exeter. In Somerset: Weston Bampfylde; Hardington

Baron Poltimore, of Poltimore in the County of Devon, is a title in the Peerage of the United Kingdom. It was created in 1831 for Sir George Bampfylde, 6th Baronet. His son, the second Baron, held office as Treasurer of the Household from 1872 to 1874 in the first Liberal administration of William Ewart Gladstone.

As of 2010 the titles are held by the latter's great-great-grandson, the seventh Baron, who succeeded his grandfather in 1978. He has notably been a director of Sotheby's and appears on the Antiques Roadshow as Mark Poltimore, one of the experts on paintings. In 2013 he appeared in the film Trance playing the role of Francis Lemaitre, an auctioneer.

The Bampfylde Baronetcy, of Poltimore in the County of Devon, was created in the Baronetage of England on 14 July 1641 for John Bampfylde, the ancestor of the first Baron. He represented Penryn in the House of Commons. His son, the second Baronet, sat as Member of Parliament for Tiverton and Devonshire. His grandson, the third Baronet, and great-grandson, the fourth Baronet, both represented Exeter and Devonshire in the House of Commons. The latter's son, the fifth Baronet, also sat as Member of Parliament for Exeter. He was shot by an ex-servant on 7 April 1823 and died twelve days later. He was succeeded by his son, the aforementioned sixth Baronet, who was elevated to the peerage in 1831.

Another member of the Bampfylde family was Thomas Bampfylde, brother of the first Baronet. He served briefly as Speaker of the House of Commons in 1659. Also, John Codrington Bampfylde, younger son of the fourth Baronet, was a poet.

The ancestral seat of the Bampfylde family was Poltimore House, near Exeter, Devon, and from the 15th century at North Molton, North Devon. Their Exeter townhouse was Bampfylde House, built c. 1590, destroyed by bombing in 1942 during WW II. The seventh Baron and his family live near Hungerford, Berkshire.

== Bampfylde baronets, of Poltimore (1641) ==
- Sir John Bampfylde, 1st Baronet (c. 1610–1650)
- Sir Coplestone Bampfylde, 2nd Baronet (c. 1633–1692)
  - Hugh Bampfylde (c. 1663–1691)
- Sir Coplestone Warwick Bampfylde, 3rd Baronet (c. 1689–1727)
- Sir Richard Warwick Bampfylde, 4th Baronet (1722–1776)
- Sir Charles Warwick Bampfylde, 5th Baronet (1753–1823)
- Sir George Warwick Bampfylde, 6th Baronet (1786–1858) (created Baron Poltimore in 1831)

== Barons Poltimore (1831) ==
- George Warwick Bampfylde, 1st Baron Poltimore (1786–1858)
- Augustus Frederick George Warwick Bampfylde, 2nd Baron Poltimore (1837–1908); only son of the 1st Baron
- Coplestone Richard George Warwick Bampfylde, 3rd Baron Poltimore (1859–1918); eldest son of the 2nd Baron
- George Wentworth Warwick Bampfylde, 4th Baron Poltimore (1882–1965); eldest son of the 3rd Baron
  - Hon. (Coplestone) John de Grey Warwick Bampfylde (1914–1936); only son of the 4th Baron, predeceased his father unmarried.
- Arthur Blackett Warwick Bampfylde, 5th Baron Poltimore (1883–1967); 2nd son of 3rd Baron
- Hugh de Burgh Warwick Bampfylde, 6th Baron Poltimore (1888–1978); 3rd and youngest son of 3rd Baron
  - Hon. Anthony Gerard Hugh Bampfylde (1920–1969); eldest son of the 6th Baron
- Mark Coplestone Bampfylde, 7th Baron Poltimore (b. 1957); grandson of the 6th Baron through his eldest son

The heir apparent is the present holder's eldest son, the Hon. Henry Anthony Warwick Bampfylde (b. 1985)
