= Sir Coplestone Bampfylde, 2nd Baronet =

English politician

Sir Coplestone Bampfylde Bt JP DL
- Arms of Bampfylde, Barons Poltimore: Or, on a bend gules three mullets argent

Member of the English Parliament for Tiverton
- In office 1659–1659 Serving with Francis Warner
- Preceded by: Robert Shapcote
- Succeeded by: Not represented in Restored Rump

Member of the English Parliament for Devon
- In office 1671–1679 Serving with Sir John Rolle
- Preceded by: Sir John Rolle; Earl of Torrington
- Succeeded by: Sir Edward Seymour; Sir William Courtenay

Member of the English Parliament for Devon
- In office 1685–1689 Serving with Sir Bourchier Wrey
- Preceded by: Samuel Rolle; Sir William Courtenay
- Succeeded by: Samuel Rolle; Francis Courtenay

Personal details
- Born: ca. 1633
- Died: 9 February 1692 Warleigh, England
- Cause of death: Gout
- Resting place: Poltimore, Devon, England
- Parent: Sir John Bampfylde, 1st Baronet (father)
- Relatives: Sir Coplestone Bampfylde, 3rd Baronet (grandson)

Sir Coplestone Bampfylde, 2nd Bt., DL, JP (ca. 1633 – 9 February 1692) of Poltimore and North Molton and Warleigh, Tamerton Foliot, in Devon, was an English politician who sat in the House of Commons at various times between 1659 and 1689.

== Origins ==
Bampfylde was the eldest son of Sir John Bampfylde, 1st Baronet (1590–1650), of Poltimore and North Molton, by his wife, Gertrude Coplestone, 4th daughter of Amyas Coplestone and co-heiress of her brother John Coplestone of Copplestone in the parish of Colebrooke and of Warleigh in the parish of Tamerton Foliot, Devon. His brother-in-law was Sir William Morice, 1st Baronet, husband of his sister Gertrude Bampfylde.

== Career ==
He matriculated at Corpus Christi College, Oxford on 20 March 1651, where he befriended Sir John Drake, 1st Baronet.

He succeeded to the baronetcy in 1651 on the death of his father. He was nominated Justice of the Peace for Devon in 1656 and one year later became a Commissioner for Assessment.

In 1659, Bampfylde was elected Member of Parliament for Tiverton, Devon, in the Third Protectorate Parliament. Although his father and two of his uncles were considered Roundheads (Parliamentarians), Bampfylde himself was a very active Royalist.

In February 1660, he delivered a petition from Devon's population for more rights to the king's general George Monck, on the discovery of which by Parliament he was temporarily imprisoned in the Tower of London.

In 1660, he was appointed a Commissioner of Militia, serving subsequently as colonel of the Devon Militia. He became the first High Sheriff of Devon after the Restoration of the Monarchy and toured the Western Circuit as a Commissioner of Oyer and Terminer. He was a Deputy Lieutenant of Devon from 1661 and worked as Commissioner for Corporations in the following two years.

In 1671, Bampfylde was elected MP for Devon in 1671 in a by-election to the Cavalier Parliament which seat he held until 1679. He was reasonably diligent as an MP, until the outbreak of the Popish Plot in the autumn of 1678, when the hysterical political atmosphere caused him to retire to his home. He generally voted with the Court party, especially after his second marriage, when he was much influenced by his father-in-law, Sir Courtenay Pole, who enjoyed the personal regard of Charles II. He was again elected MP for Devon in 1685 and held the seat until 1689. He initially welcomed the Glorious Revolution, but in his last years became a stern critic of the new regime.

=== Greets Grand Duke of Tuscany ===
Sir Coplestone Bampfylde is mentioned in the Travel Journal of Cosimo III de' Medici, Grand Duke of Tuscany (1642–1723) in connection with his visit to Plymouth on 5 April 1669:

"The governor then came to take leave, and afterwards Sir Richard Edgecumbe and Mr. Prideaux came in, to wish his highness a good journey. About three they dined, and towards five, took their departure; his Highness being attended by the governor on horseback, who, when they had got two miles from Plymouth, appeared at the coach-door, to take leave once more. He had wished to have paraded the military, as was done on his highness's arrival, but the latter courteously declined it. When they had proceeded about a mile after the governor's departure, there came galloping up to the coach, Sir Copleston Bampfylde, with his wife and sister. They happened to be hunting in that neighbourhood and wished not to lose the opportunity of performing an act of respect to his highness. The serene prince stopped the carriage, and received their compliments, but did not alight to salute them, not knowing, till afterwards, who the ladies were".

== Marriage and progeny ==
He married twice:

- Firstly at Fordingbridge, Hampshire, on 16 November 1655 to Margaret Bulkeley, daughter of John Bulkeley John Bulkeley (MP) of Burgate, Fordingbridge, Hampshire, (although one source mistakenly has his name as 'Francis') by whom he had two sons and a daughter:
  - Col. Hugh Bampfield (d. 1690), eldest son and heir apparent, who predeceased his father having died in a fall from his horse. He married Mary Clifford, daughter of James Clifford of Ware, by whom he had a son Sir Coplestone Bampfylde, 3rd Baronet.
  - Coplestone Bampfylde (1659–1669), 2nd son, a precocious scholar who died young aged 10 and whose monument survives on the south side of the chancel in St Mary's Church, Tamerton Foliot. His effigy, dressed like an adult man, is shown seated at a desk with hand on a book and wears a gown and band with a large bushy wig. Below are elaborate inscriptions in Latin and Greek.
  - John Coplestone Bulkeley Bampfield, 3rd son, who died without issue.
  - Margaret Bampfield, died an infant.
- Secondly at Houghton, South Devon, on 21 October 1674 to Jane Pole, daughter of Sir Courtenay Pole, 2nd Baronet of Shute, Devon and his wife Urith Shapcote; without progeny. She remarried Edward Gibbons.

== Character ==
He was tall, strongly built and handsome, with "ready wit and good judgment"; in manner "a true gentleman, courteous and obliging". His luxurious way of life caused him to live beyond his income for many years.

== Death and burial ==
Bampfyle died of gout at Warleigh and was buried at Poltimore. On his deathbed, he required his assembled family to pledge loyalty to the Church of England and to the crown.

== Succession ==
His eldest son Hugh Bampfield having predeceased him by one year, he was succeeded in the baronetcy by his grandson Sir Coplestone Bampfylde, 3rd Baronet.

Parliament of England
Preceded by Robert Shapcote	Member of Parliament for Tiverton; 1659; With: Francis Warner	Succeeded by Not represented in Restored Rump
Preceded by Sir John Rolle; Earl of Torrington	Member of Parliament for Devon; 1671–1679; With: Sir John Rolle	Succeeded by Sir Edward Seymour; Sir William Courtenay
Preceded by Samuel Rolle; Sir William Courtenay	Member of Parliament for Devon; 1685–1689; With: Sir Bourchier Wrey	Succeeded by Samuel Rolle; Francis Courtenay
Baronetage of England
Preceded by John Bampfylde	Baronet (of Poltimore); 1651–1692	Succeeded by Coplestone Bampfylde
