= Poltimore House =

Historic building in Devon, England

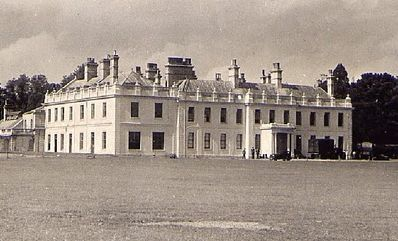
- Poltimore House c. 1930

- Location within Devon
- Alternative names: Bampfylde House

General information
- Status: under renovation
- Type: Country house
- Architectural style: Tudor
- Location: Poltimore, Devon, England
- Coordinates: 50°45′29″N 3°27′54″W
- Construction started: 1550
- Renovated: begun 2005
- Owner: Poltimore House Trust

Listed Building – Grade II*
- Designated: 11 November 1952
- Reference no.: 1098310

Arms of Bampfylde of Poltimore and North Molton: Or, on a bend gules three mullets argent

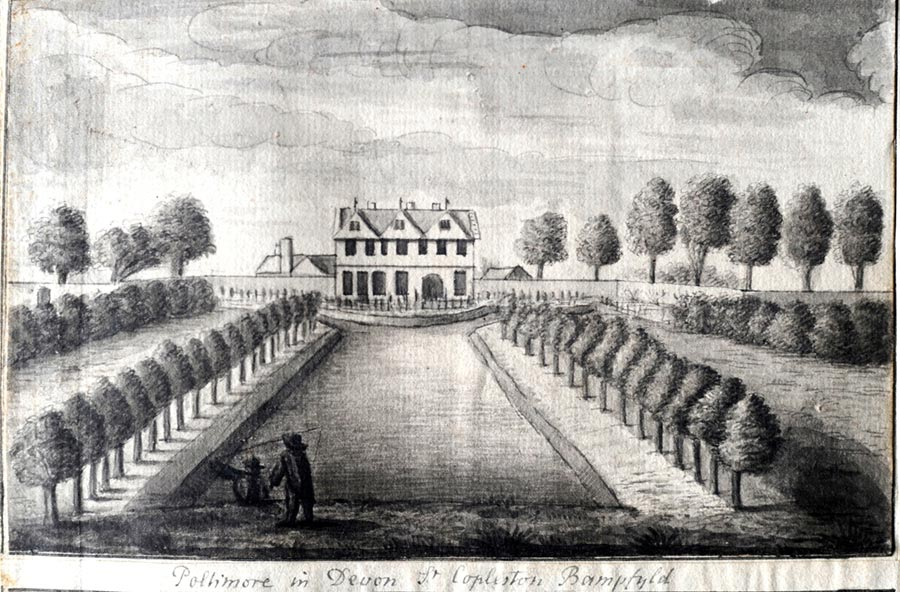
Poltimore House, drawing by Edmund Prideaux (1693-1745) of Prideaux Place, Cornwall inscribed: Poltimore in Devon, Sir Copleston Bampfyld. Sir Coplestone Warwick Bampfylde, 3rd Baronet (d.1727) inherited Poltimore from his grandfather Sir Coplestone Bampfylde, 2nd Baronet (d.1691)

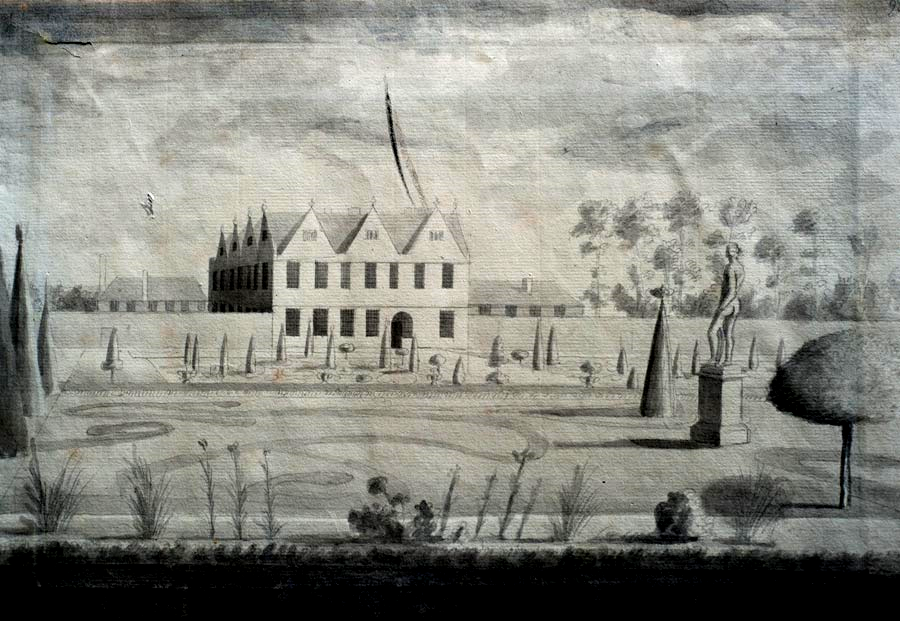
Another drawing of Poltimore House by Edmund Prideaux

Poltimore House is an 18th-century country house in Poltimore, Devon, England. The Manor of Poltimore was from the 13th to the 20th century the seat of the Bampfylde family, which acquired the title Baron Poltimore in 1831. The house retains much of the fabric of earlier buildings on the site erected by the family. It is designated a Grade II* listed building.

It fell into a dilapidated condition during the second half of the 20th century. A group of volunteers began raising funds to restore the house in 2003, after it was a finalist in the BBC's Restoration programme, missing out on the funding that went with the top prize.

Early in the morning of 9 April 2024 a fire broke out in the building causing extensive structural damage.

== History ==
=== Acquisition by Bampfyldes ===
The Bampfylde family were bequeathed the Manor of Poltimore in 1298 by William Pontyngton, a canon of Exeter Cathedral. There is no record of where the early manor house was located, but it is believed to have been situated in or near the village. There is no evidence of a previous house having occupied the site of the present one. Poltimore House was built by Richard Bampfylde (1526-1594), who started the works in 1550.

There is no record of when the house was completed, although when Richard died in 1595, he bequeathed the house to his son, Amyas Bampfylde (d.1626), in his will. As Richard had been appointed Sheriff of Devon in 1576, it is likely that his grand house was complete by then. Two wings of his original house can still be seen in the present building. It is not known what form the original house took, whether it was just these two wings forming an "L", or if there was a third or even a fourth wing forming a courtyard in the middle. Later members of the family added to the building, the last major building works having been in 1908.

The Politmore estate held a number of tenanted estate farms in the area, such as that at Whipton Barton, at Huxham and Heavitree. Many of these had long standing tenants, such as the Rewes at Whipton Barton, where tenancies spanned hundreds of years.

=== Sold by Bampfyldes ===
It was occupied by the Bampfylde family until 1920, when it was offered for sale with its grounds and estate. The estate was sold but not the house and grounds, which were then leased to house Poltimore College, a girls' school that closed in 1939. In 1940, the boys from Dover College were evacuated to Poltimore House.

=== Hospital ===
The house became a private hospital in 1945, being bought by two Exeter doctors. The conversion to a hospital included the installation of an operating theatre and x-ray facilities.

The hospital had a significant maternity operation, with 1,401 births recorded at Politmore between 1945 and 1960.

Following the formation of the NHS in 1948, around half the admissions were NHS patients, and on the retirement of the doctors who owned the hospital in 1962, the property was sold to the Exeter & Mid-Devon Hospitals Management Committee as a working hospital for £30,000. It then formally became an annex to the Royal Devon and Exeter Hospital, with 70 beds.

It closed as a hospital on 18 June 1974.

=== Dilapidation ===
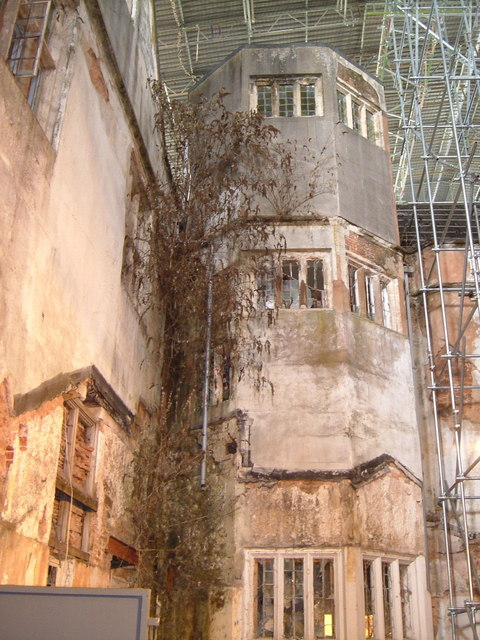
Poltimore House, view from inside the courtyard of restoration works

It then had a series of owners before suffering an arson attack in 1987 and being left empty from then on. It suffered from theft and vandalism and fell into a state of dilapidation.

== Poltimore House Trust ==
In 2000, Poltimore House Trust was set up to find a use for the house and restore it. The first phase was to encase the house in scaffolding with a roof to protect it, which was done in 2005. In 2009, the Trust secured £500,000 from English Heritage to begin the restoration process.

Poltimore House Trust published its 10-year strategic business plan in 2009. The plan stated that by 2019 the renovated Poltimore House would become:

- A showcase for the Arts and Creative Industries: a venue for arts, crafts, media companies, filmmakers and software developers.
- A home for Creative Entrepreneurs: high-specification workspaces, hot-desking and studios with excellent communications.
- The Poltimore Forum: high-profile lectures, workshops and mentoring sessions to bring leading-edge thinkers to the South West.
- The Club at Poltimore House: a meeting venue for the region with super-equipped meeting spaces for briefings, networking and research.
- Intensive innovation: exposing new thinking, practice, learning, skills: linking academia, heritage, industry, technology and the arts.
- A different day out: Poltimore House to attract visitors seeking inspiration, skills and learning, networks, relaxation and fun.

This range of projects was designed to bring Poltimore House and its grounds back to use as an important resource for local and regional businesses, arts and the community.

== Friends of Poltimore House ==
The charity Friends of Poltimore House was started in 2004. It allows public access to Poltimore House at times published on its website.

== Charities involved in restoration ==
- The Friends of Poltimore House, Poltimore House, Poltimore, Exeter, EX4 0AU email: chairman@poltimore.org.uk
- Poltimore House Trust, Poltimore House, Poltimore, Exeter, EX4 0AU email: secretary@poltimore.org

== See also ==
- List of Restoration Candidates
- Baron Poltimore
