= Bicton Woodland Railway =

Railway line in Devon, England

Coordinates: 50°40′02″N 3°19′11″W

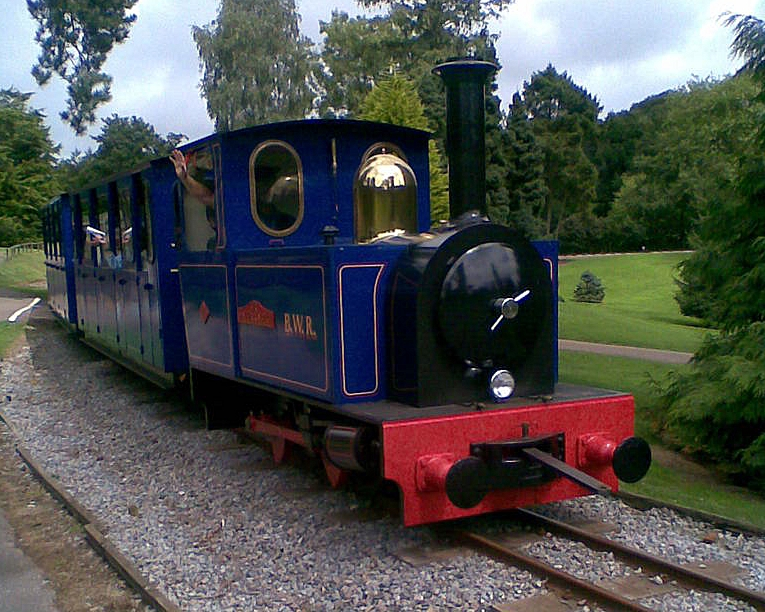
- Sir Walter Raleigh

Overview
- Headquarters: Budleigh Salterton
- Locale: England
- Dates of operation: 1963–Present

Technical
- Track gauge: 18 in (457 mm)
- Length: 1,359 yd (0.772 mi; 1.243 km)

The Bicton Woodland Railway is a narrow-gauge railway running in Bicton Park Botanical Gardens in the grounds of Bicton House near Budleigh Salterton in Devon.

The line was built in 1962 as a tourist attraction for visitors to the house. Most of the rolling stock was acquired from the Royal Arsenal Railway, Woolwich, with two locomotives, Woolwich and Carnegie coming from that source, as well as seven goods wagons which were reduced to their frames and converted to passenger carriages. It opened to passengers in 1963. Originally locomotives and carriages had royal blue livery.

Additional rolling stock was acquired from the RAF Fauld railway and the internal railway of the LNWR Wolverton works.

In 1998, the Bicton Gardens were put up for sale and the railway put into hiatus. The new owners sold the line's existing stock, and in 2000 took delivery of a 5.5 t (5.4 long tons; 6.1 short tons) diesel-powered replica tank engine. The line's original equipment was purchased by the Waltham Abbey Royal Gunpowder Mills museum at Waltham Abbey.

== Locomotives ==
Number	Name	Builder	Type	Date	Works number	Notes
1	Woolwich	Avonside Engine Company	0-4-0T	1916	1748	ex-Royal Arsenal Railway. Now at the Statfold Barn Railway
2(Later 3)	Bicton	Ruston and Hornsby	4wDM	1942	213839	Built for the War Department storage depot at Lion Brickworks, Scalford
3(Later 2)	Carnegie	Hunslet	0-4-4-0DM	1954	4524	ex-Royal Arsenal Railway. Now at the Statfold Barn Railway
4	Sir Walter Raleigh	Alan Keef	0-4-0DM (steam outline)	2000	61	Custom built. First driven by Pete Cuffley in 2000.

== See also ==
- British narrow-gauge railways
