= Alys Fowler =

British television presenter

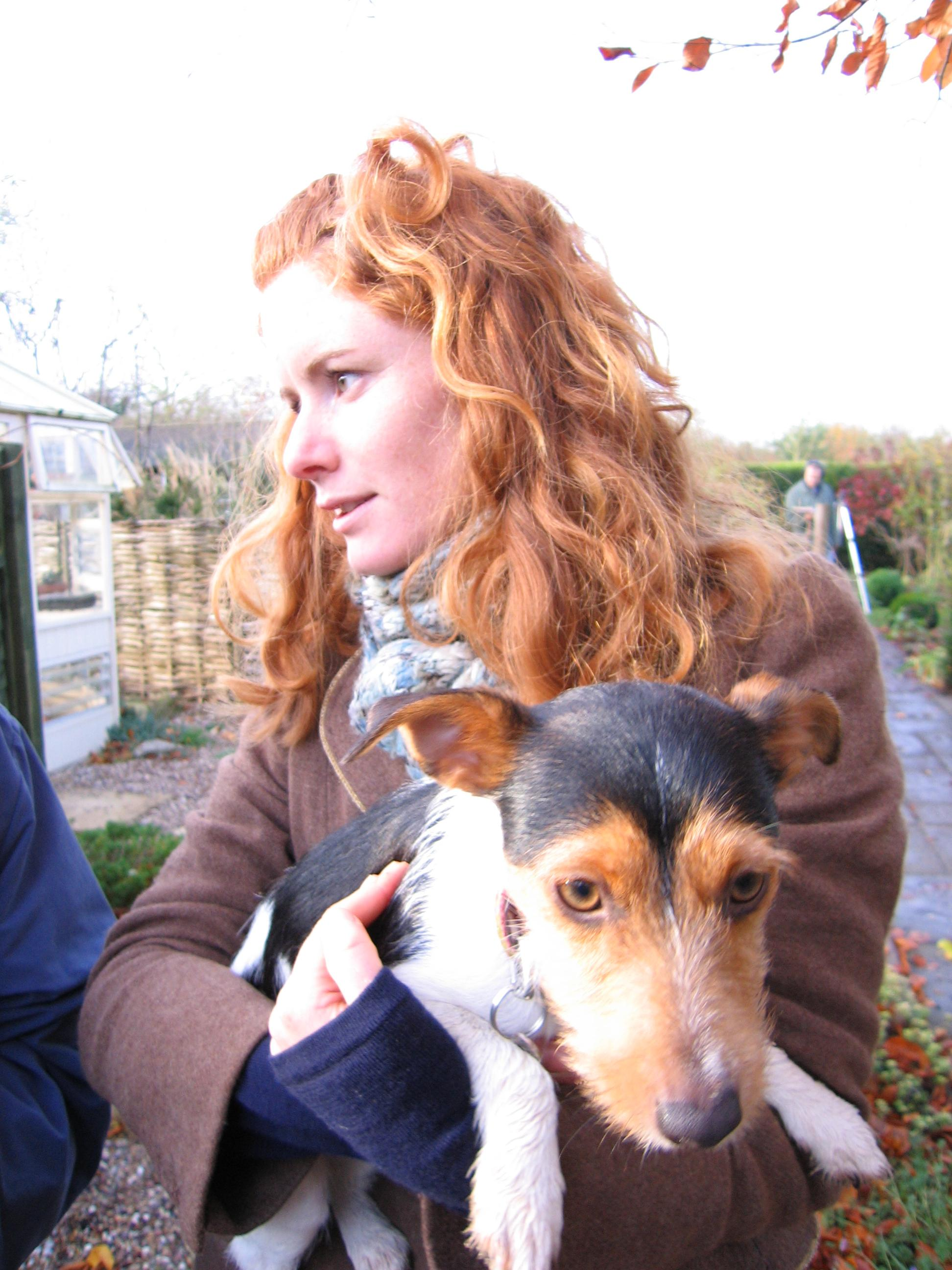
- Fowler in 2007
- Born: 9 November 1977 (age 48)
- Education: Bedales School
- Alma mater: Royal Horticultural Society; Royal Botanic Gardens, Kew; University College London
- Occupations: Gardener; Writer

Alys Fowler (born 9 November 1977) is a British horticulturist and journalist. She was a presenter on the long-running BBC television programme Gardeners' World.

== Early life and education ==
Fowler was born in Silchester, Hampshire, and had a rural childhood. Her father was a doctor, and her mother ran various businesses – she had 200 chickens and sold their eggs, trained gun dogs, and would dog-sit for Londoners. She was influenced by her mother's gardening talents and the degree of self-sufficiency it afforded the family. After leaving Bedales School in 1996, she studied at the Royal Horticultural Society, and the Royal Botanic Gardens, Kew in London, where she became interested in bringing a more organic and accessible aesthetic to landscape gardening. In 1998, she was awarded a Smithsonian Scholarship to study at the New York Botanical Gardens based in the Bronx.

Fowler returned to the UK in 1999 to attend University College London, where, in 2002, she completed a master's degree in Society, Science and the Environment.

== Career ==
Fowler began working as a journalist for Horticulture Week, and Landscape Review.

In 2005, she worked for BBC Gardeners' World and Parks as a horticultural researcher. In 2006, she became Head Gardener of the BBC garden at Berryfields in Stratford-Upon-Avon, and created features at the Gardeners' World Live shows.

In 2007, she published The Thrifty Gardener: How to Create a Stylish Garden for Next to Nothing.

In 2008, after appearing occasionally in her Berryfields role, she became a regular presenter on Gardeners' World, and wrote a monthly blog on the programme's website. She was dropped by the BBC for the 2011 series, at the same time that Toby Buckland's contract as main presenter was not renewed.

She is published regularly in newspapers and magazines, including The Guardian, Gardeners' World Magazine, Gardens Illustrated, Amateur Gardening, Country Living, and The Daily Mail.

In New York City, in 1998, she found ways of experiencing and creating green space, such as growing plants on her apartment's fire escape, and joining a garden-making community in Manhattan's Lower East Side which reused objects found in New York's streets and dumpsters. This became an influential period and spawned the idea for her first book in 2007, The Thrifty Gardener.

Filming for her BBC series, The Edible Garden – a.k.a. A Home-Grown Life – began in mid-2009, and the series aired on BBC 2 in April 2010. She explored community self-sustainability in the urban environment of South Birmingham. Her second book, The Edible Garden, was published in March 2010 by BBC Books to accompany the TV series.

Continuing with eco-friendly gardening culture she focused on the benefits that allotments bring to the environment and those who work on them. In 2013, she presented an episode of Great British Garden Revival. She had a weekly column in The Guardian giving advice on growing vegetables, fruit and flowers until December 2022.

== Personal life ==
Having previously lived in London, Fowler lived in Birmingham as of 2008. She came out as "gay. Or maybe bisexual" in 2016, ended her marriage, and wrote about both in The Guardian and in a March 2017 book, Hidden Nature: A Voyage Of Discovery.

In 2018 she referred to herself as a lesbian stating, "I do call myself a lesbian. I’m very happy to be a lesbian. I’ve got here.".

== Bibliography ==
- The Thrifty Gardener: How To Create a Stylish Garden for Next to Nothing. Kyle Cathie Ltd. 2007. ISBN 978-1-85626-777-9.
- Garden Anywhere ( a version of The Thrifty Gardener). Chronicle Books. 25 March 2009. ISBN 978-0-8118-6875-4.
- The Edible Garden. BBC Books. 11 March 2010. ISBN 978-1-84607-974-0.
- The Thrifty Forager. Kyle Books. 8 September 2011. ISBN 978-1-85626-912-4.
- Abundance: How to Store and Preserve Your Garden Produce Growing Harvesting Drying Pickling Fermenting Bottling Freezing. Kyle Books. 16 May 2013. ISBN 978-0-85783-078-4.
- Hidden Nature: A Voyage Of Discovery. Hodder & Stoughton. April 2017. ISBN 978-1-473-62300-2.
- Fowler, Alys (2019). A Modern Herbal. Michael Joseph. ISBN 978-0241368336.
