= Matt James (TV presenter) =

British garden designer

- Born: 27 April 1975 (age 50); Essex, England
- Education: Merrist Wood College; Writtle College
- Occupations: Garden designer Horticulturist; Lecturer
- Known for: The City Gardener
- Website: Official website

Matt James (born 27 April 1975 in Essex) is a British garden designer, horticulturist and university lecturer who rose to fame on the Channel 4's The City Gardener.

== Early life and education ==
James was born 27 April 1975 in Essex, the older of two sons. He credits his mother with "creating in [him] an awareness of and love for plants." He attended secondary school in Sutton, London and worked at a local market garden after leaving school. He received a diploma in plant production and garden centers from Merrist Wood College in 1996, followed by a year at a nursery in Somerset and a degree in horticulture from Writtle College.

== Career ==
James hosted The City Gardener on Channel 4 between 2002 and 2005, followed by an American version called Urban Outsiders on HGTV. He subsequently hosted UKTV's Matt James' Eco Eden and was gardening expert on Selling Houses. He also appeared on an episode of Great British Garden Revivalin 2014. In 2011, James joined the Gardenline panel on BBC and guested on Gardeners' Question Time.

James taught horticulture and landscape design courses at Duchy College and North East Surrey College of Technology, followed by five years at University College Falmouth starting in 2008. He later created the landscape design programme at the Eden Project, where he taught between 2014 and 2021.

Since 2018, James has run a landscape design firm, James & Co Landscapes, based in Cornwall. He has also written for numerous publications about gardening and garden design including The Daily Telegraph, The Sunday Times, The Garden and the Garden Design Journal. James was chosen as Londoner-of-the-Year in the Environment and Regeneration category in 2000 after helping establish a farmers' market in South London. He has also won two gold awards at the annual California Landscape Contractors' Association Awards.

== Personal life ==
James lives in Cornwall with his wife Ellie and their children.

== Publications ==
- 2003: The City Gardener, ISBN 9780007155682,Collins
- 2004: The City Gardener: Urban Oasis, ISBN 9780007176281, Collins
- 2005: The City Garden Bible, ISBN 9781905026043, Channel 4 Books; Transworld Publishers
- 2014: The Urban Gardener, ISBN 978-1784722869, Royal Horticultural Society books; Mitchell Beazley
- 2016: How to Plant a Garden, ISBN 978-1845339845, Royal Horticultural Society books; Mitchell Beazley
