= Guildford College =

Further education establishment in the United Kingdom

Guildford College of Further and Higher Education
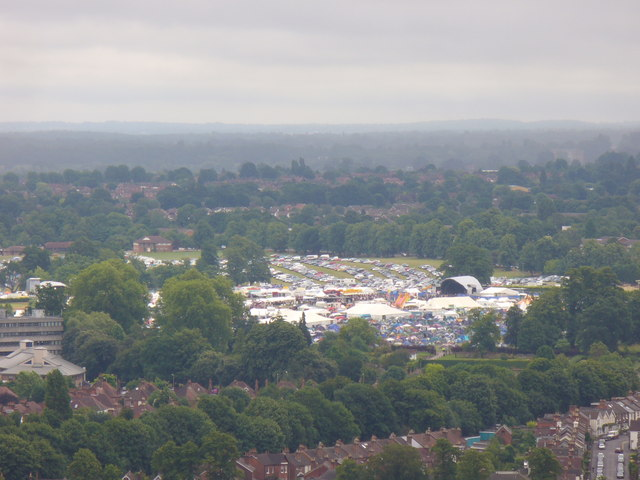
- Stoke Park during GuilFest with some of the college buildings at the largest campus (left)

Location
- Stoke Road Guildford, Surrey; England

Information
- Type: FE & HE College
- Established: 1939
- Age: 16 to adult
- Website: guildford.ac.uk

The Guildford College of Further and Higher Education (also referred to as Guildford College) is a further education institution in Guildford, Surrey, England, United Kingdom.

The institution was established in 1939 for students of age 16+ undertaking full-time and part-time studies. It was funded by Surrey County Council until March 2019, when it left the council’s control and became part of the Oxford-based education group Activate Learning.

Its original campus is signposted and known as Guildford College. GCFHE has expanded by incorporating two colleges to the north-west and 6 miles (9.7 km) to the west in Surrey.

== Campuses ==
- Stoke Road on the former north-west corner of Stoke Park, Guildford
- Merrist Wood near Worplesdon which traditionally specialises in practical and theoretical landscape-related careers and agricultural vocational courses
- Since 2007: Farnham College in the town of Farnham which sits on the Hampshire border.

=== Merrist Wood College ===
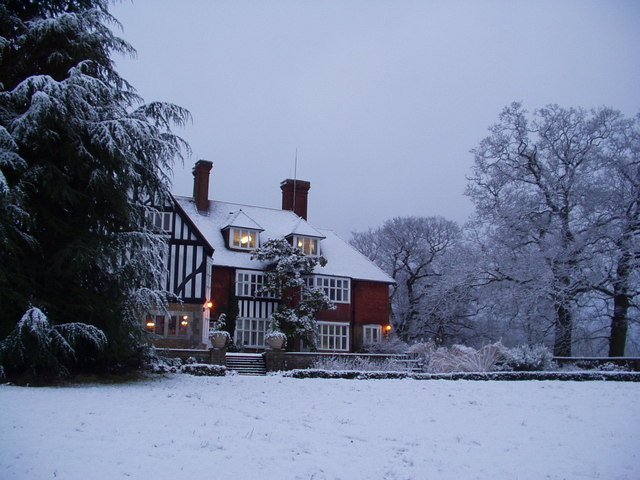
Merrist Wood College

For its education purposes the college manages 400 acres (1.6 km^{2}) of land (51.272°N 0.623°W) from which expertise it produces valuable produce and, adjoining hedgerows, supports biodiversity. Key specialisations are:

- horticulture
- floristry
- BTS studies
- landscaping
- garden design
- animal care
- countryside
- golf course and landscapes maintenance and enhancement
- sports turf maintenance and enhancement
- arboriculture
- equine studies.

== See also ==
- List of forestry universities and colleges
- List of further education colleges in England

== Notable alumni ==
- Julie Dawn Cole, Actor
- Paul Merrett, ITV Chef
- Sam Underwood, Actor
- Jill Whelan, Actress
- Matt James, garden designer
