= Great British Garden Revival =

Television series

- Also known as: Factual
- Genre: Documentary
- Country of origin: United Kingdom
- Original language: English
- No. of series: 1
- No. of episodes: 10 (list of episodes)

Production
- Executive producer: Bridget Boseley
- Production company: Outline Productions

Original release
- Network: BBC Two; BBC Two HD
- Release: 9 December 2013 – 21 January 2015

Great British Garden Revival is a British documentary television series that was first broadcast on BBC Two on 9 December 2013. The series was presented by Monty Don, Carol Klein, Joe Swift, Rachel De Thame, James Wong, Tom Hart Dyke, Chris Beardshaw, Alys Fowler, Charlie Dimmock, Diarmuid Gavin, Christine Walkden, Toby Buckland, Sarah Raven and Matt James. Each episode shows two presenters focusing on an endangered part of gardens.

A second series aired on 6–21 January 2015

== Production ==
Great British Garden Revival was commissioned by Lindsay Bradbury of BBC Daytime and executive produced by Bridget Boseley. The series consists of ten episodes and was made by Outline Productions for BBC Two. The series was developed by Ross McCarthy, Outline Productions' head of development and Helen Veale, creative director. Great British Garden Revival was distributed by Hat Trick International at Mipcom.

== Episodes ==
No.	Title	Presented by	Original release date	UK viewers (millions)
1	"Wild Flowers and Front Gardens"	Monty Don and Joe Swift	9 December 2013	1.55
2	"Topiary and Roof Gardens"	Rachel De Thame and James Wong	12 December 2013	1.49
3	"Cottage Gardens and House Plants"	Carol Klein and Tom Hart Dyke	13 December 2013	N/A
4	"Cut Flowers and Trees"	Rachel De Thame and Joe Swift	6 January 2014	N/A
5	"Rock Gardens and Herb Gardens"	Carol Klein and Toby Buckland	7 January 2014	1.63
6	"Glasshouses and Shrubs"	Diarmuid Gavin and Matt James	8 January 2014	N/A
7	"Ponds and Stumperies"	Charlie Dimmock and Chris Beardshaw	9 January 2014	1.66
8	"Lawns and Tropical Gardens"	Sarah Raven and James Wong	10 January 2014	N/A
9	"Ornamental Bedding and Fruit Trees"	Christine Walkden and Toby Buckland	13 January 2014	1.46
10	"Herbaceous Borders and Kitchen Gardens"	Chris Beardshaw and Alys Fowler	14 January 2014	1.83
