= Bicton, Devon =

Village and civil parish in Devon, England

Coordinates: 50.665°N 3.336°W

Bicton
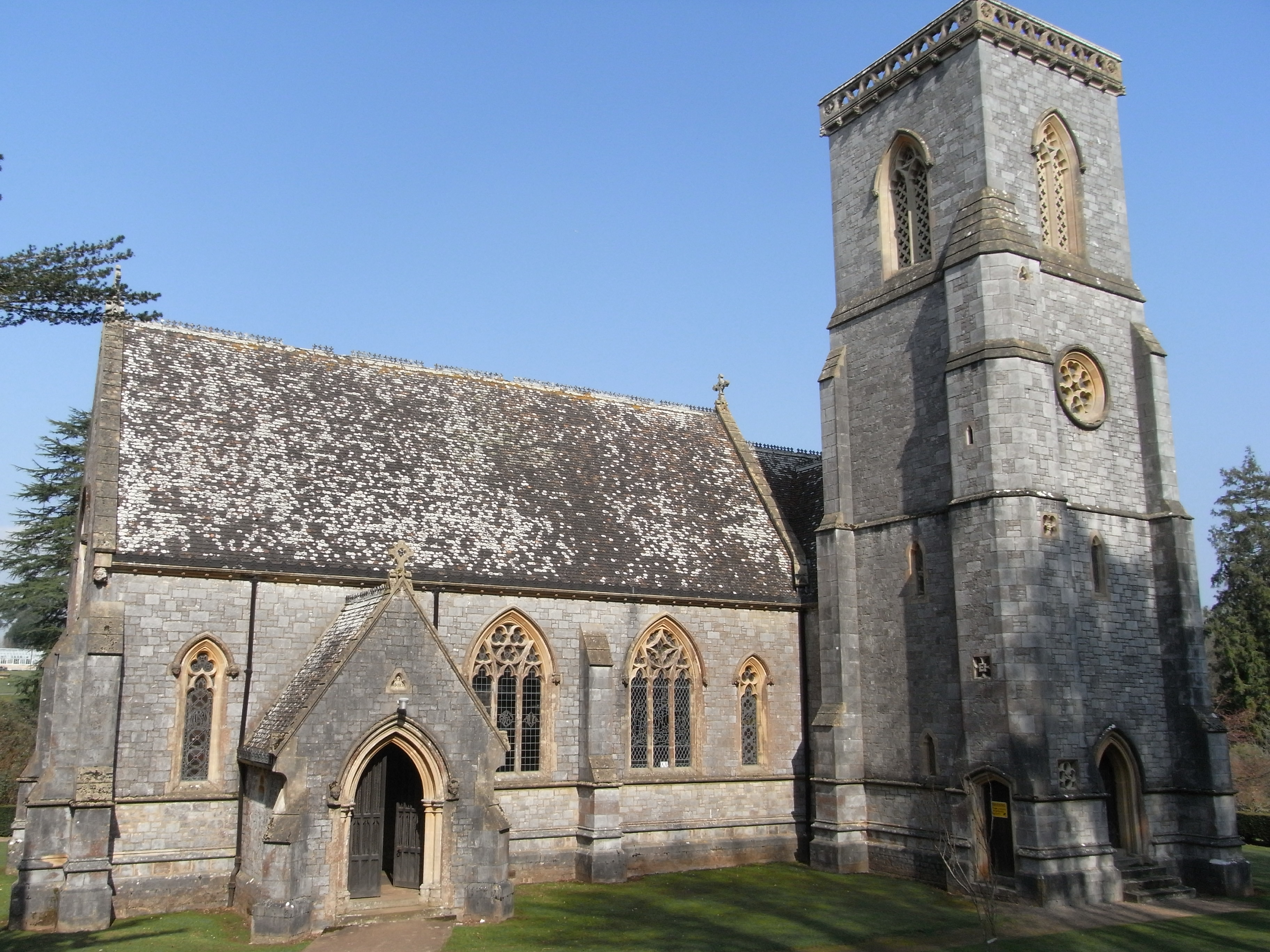
- Bicton parish church of St Mary, built in 1850

- Location within Devon
- Area: 5.28 km^{2} (2.04 sq mi)
- Population: 214 (2021 census)
  - Density: 41/km^{2} (110/sq mi)
- Civil parish: Bicton
- District: East Devon
- Shire county: Devon
- Region: South West
- Country: England
- Sovereign state: United Kingdom
- Police: Devon and Cornwall
- Fire: Devon and Somerset
- Ambulance: South Western
- UK Parliament: Exmouth and Exeter East

Bicton is a civil parish and former manor in the East Devon district of Devon, England, situated near Budleigh Salterton. At the 2021 census, the parish had a population of 214.

The parish is bordered, clockwise from the north, by Colaton Raleigh, Otterton, East Budleigh and Woodbury.

Much of the parish is occupied by the historic Bicton Park estate, whose landscape was developed principally in the 18th and 19th centuries. The park and gardens are included on the Register of Parks and Gardens at Grade I. The estate was long associated with the Rolle family, who held the manor from the 16th century onwards.

The parish also includes Bicton Common in the west, adjoining Woodbury Common, and the village of Yettington on its southern boundary.

== History ==
=== Manor ===
Bicton is recorded in the Domesday Book of 1086 as Bechetone, held by William Porter, probably by the serjeanty of guarding the gate at Exeter Castle and its prison. (Note: All subsequent lords of the manor were required to contribute to the upkeep of Exeter prison until this obligation was commuted by Act of Parliament in 1787, when the Rolle family paid a fine.)

The manor passed through several families before coming into the possession of Sir Thomas Denys (1559–1613), who died leaving two daughters as co-heiresses. His eldest daughter, Anne Denys, married Sir Henry Rolle (d. 1616) of Stevenstone, thereby bringing Bicton into the Rolle family.

John Rolle, 1st Baron Rolle died childless in 1842, aged 86. Following his second marriage to Louisa Trefusis, he designated as his heir her nephew, Mark George Kerr Trefusis, who adopted the surname Rolle in accordance with the terms of the inheritance. On his death in 1907 without a male heir, the estate passed to his nephew, Charles Hepburn-Stuart-Forbes-Trefusis, 21st Baron Clinton (1863–1957).

=== Gardens and park ===
The gardens at Bicton were begun circa 1735 and are traditionally attributed to a design by André Le Nôtre, although most of their development took place under John Rolle, 1st Baron Rolle in the early 19th century.

His improvements included the excavation of the lake in 1812 by French prisoners of war, the planting of an arboretum in 1830 and the notable Araucaria avenue in 1842. Other features include the orangery (1806), the palm house (c. 1825), and the castellated octagonal China Tower (1839).

=== Bicton House and estate ===
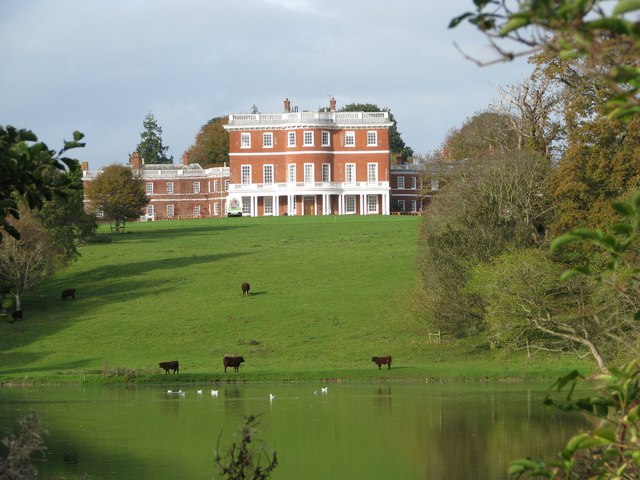
Bicton House and its lake

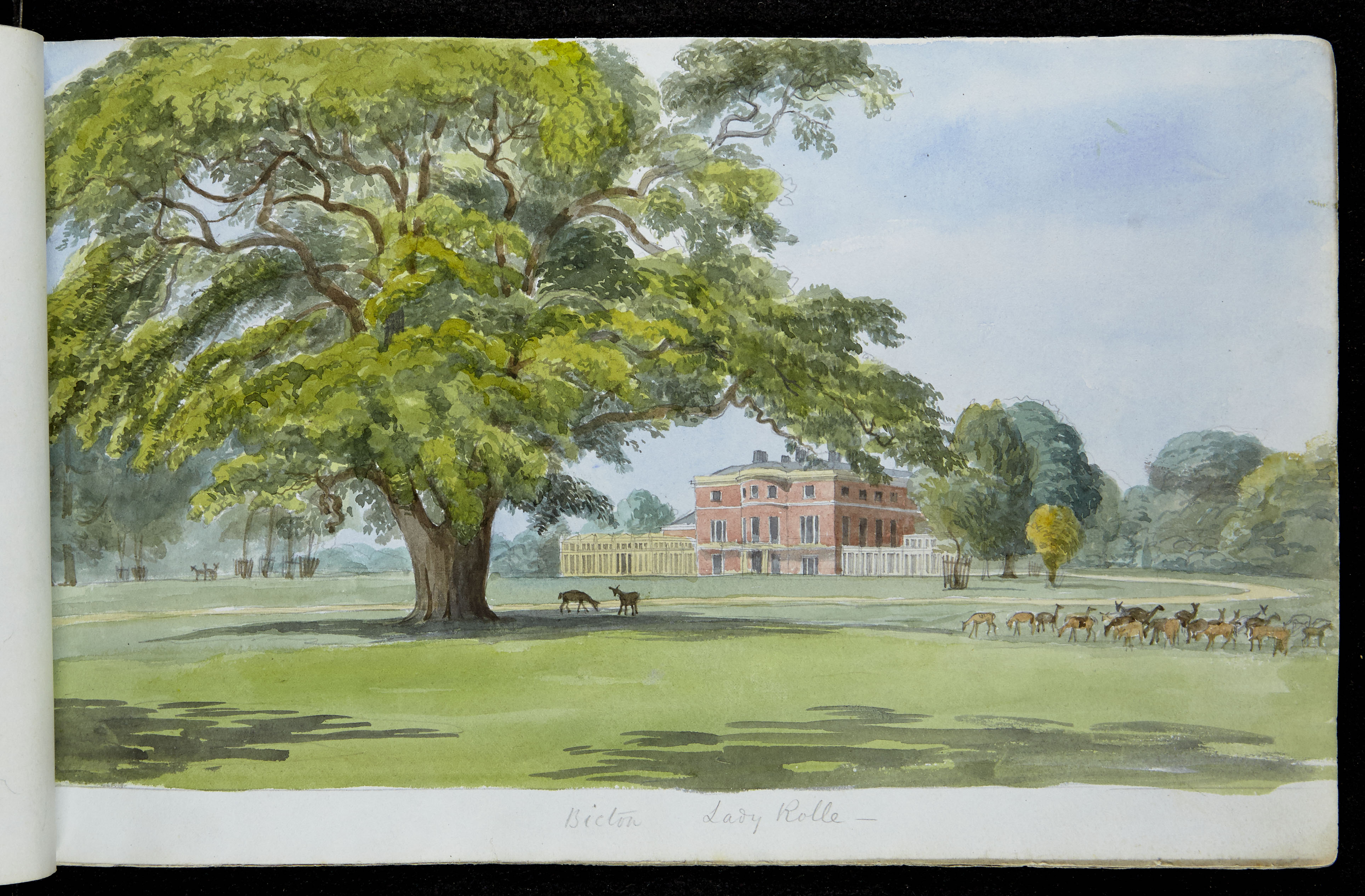
Bicton, Devon, watercolour by Edward Ashworth between 1843 and 1933

The mansion house at Bicton formed the centre of the Rolle estate. In the 20th century, the 21st Baron Clinton leased and later sold the house and its immediate grounds to Devon County Council for use as an agricultural college, now Bicton College. By 2016 the college occupied approximately 490 acres (200 ha) and provided accommodation for 231 residential students.

The gardens were restored by the 21st Baron Clinton in the 1950s and opened to the public in 1963. In 1986, the 22nd Baron Clinton transferred the botanical gardens to a charitable trust, which sold them in 1998 to Simon and Valerie Lister, who developed them into a commercial visitor attraction.

The wider estate remains in the ownership of the Baron Clinton family and is managed by Clinton Devon Estates. According to the estate, it includes approximately 17,000 acres (6,900 ha) of tenanted farmland, 4,700 acres (1,900 ha) of woodland and 2,800 acres (1,100 ha) of the East Devon Pebblebed Heaths.

== Church ==
The earlier parish church of St Mary at Bicton was of medieval origin and stood within the grounds of the estate, close to the present church. It served the parish until the mid-19th century and had, by the late 18th century, become closely associated with the Rolle estate rather than functioning as a typical village parish church.

The church was recorded in detail by the topographer John Swete, who visited in 1795 and produced a watercolour of the building in its landscaped setting. He described its surroundings as notably picturesque, reflecting the integration of the church within the designed parkland of Bicton.

By the early 19th century the medieval church was considered inadequate for the estate’s requirements, reflecting wider patterns of estate-driven church rebuilding in Devon during the period. In 1850, Lady Louisa Rolle commissioned a new parish church on the estate, situated close to the earlier structure. The old church was partly demolished, with its chancel retained and adapted as a mausoleum for the Rolle family.

The mausoleum was remodelled by Augustus Pugin and contains decorative Minton tile flooring, a vaulted ceiling, stained glass windows designed by Pugin, and a monument to the Rolle family on the north wall executed by George Myers. It also contains the baroque marble tomb of Denys Rolle (d. 1638), his wife, and son, which was described by W. G. Hoskins as "magnificent".

The present church (1850) was designed by Exeter architect John Hayward. Although W. G. Hoskins described it as "dull", it has also been noted as an early example in Devon of the influence of the Cambridge Camden Society and the Gothic Revival liturgical ideals it promoted.

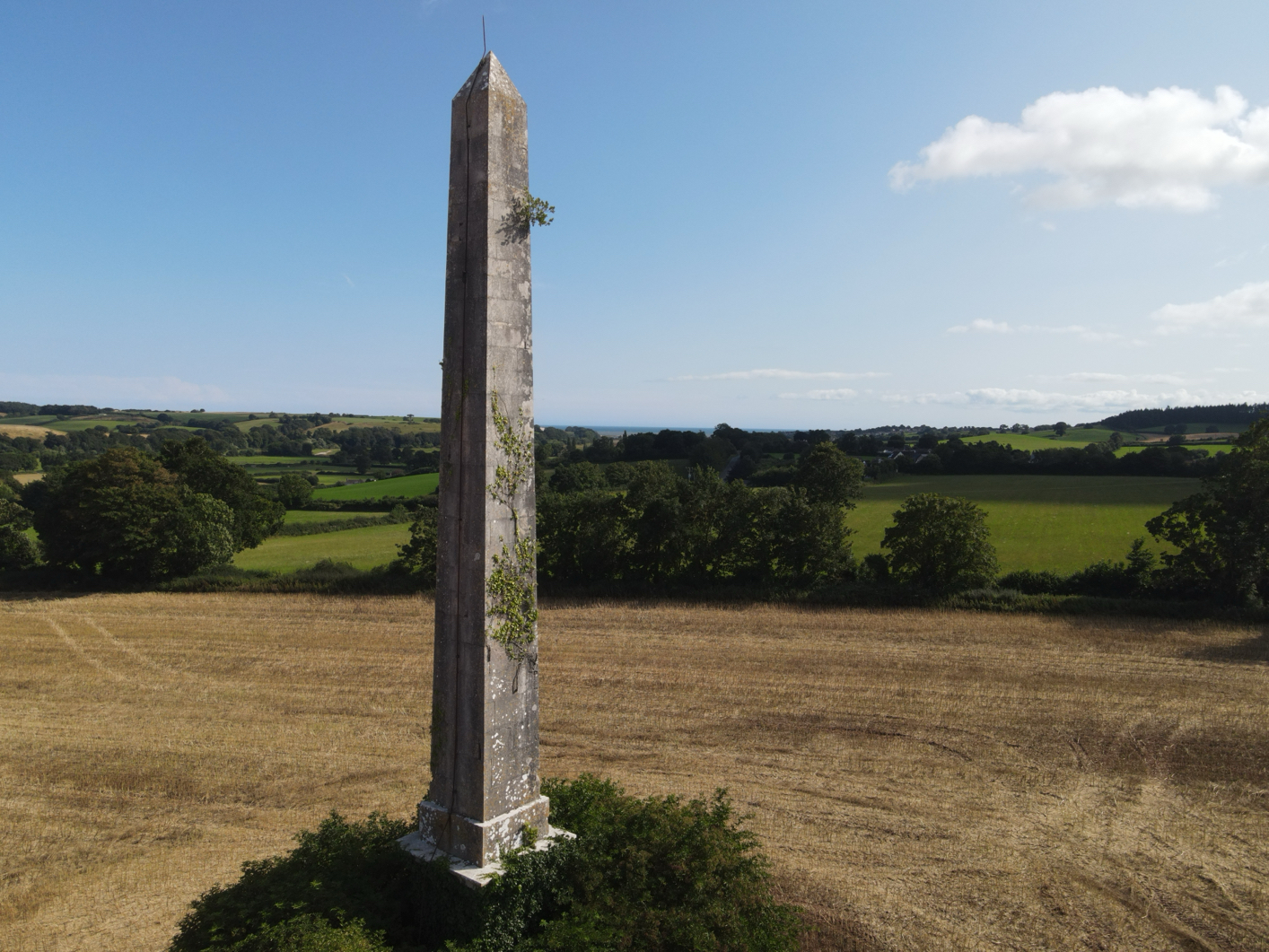
Bicton Obelisk

== Landmarks ==
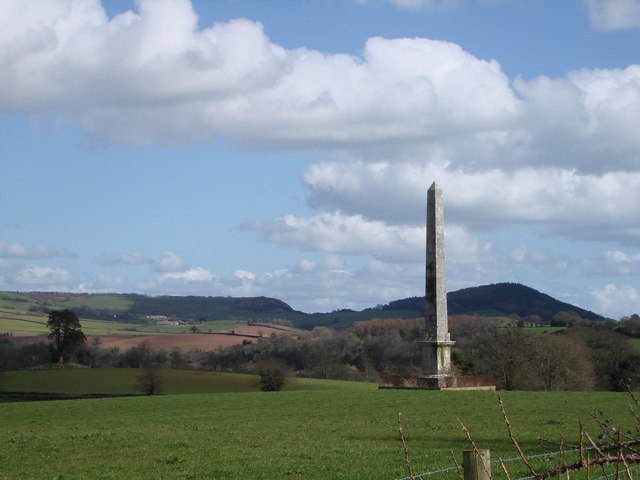
Bicton Obelisk, erected in 1747

The Bicton Obelisk, situated on the edge of the park, was erected in 1747 by Henry Rolle, 1st Baron Rolle (1708–1750). It formed part of the 18th-century landscaping of the Bicton estate and reflects the Rolle family's wider programme of ornamental park construction during this period.

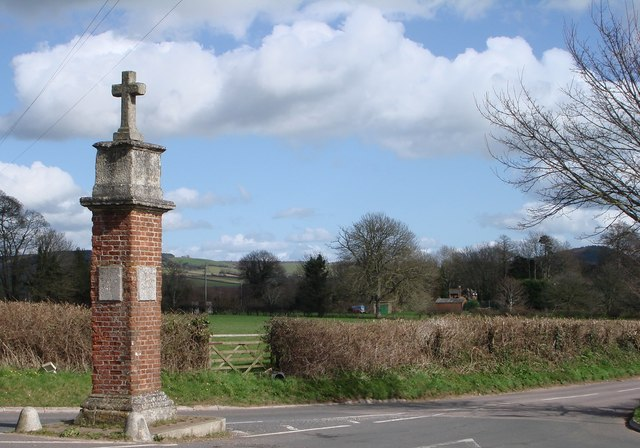
Roadside pillar at the Bicton–Otterton crossroads

A four-sided stone pillar stands at the historic crossroads between Bicton and Otterton, both formerly part of the Rolle estate. It was erected in 1743 by Henry Rolle and served both as a directional marker and as an ornamental landscape feature. The structure includes biblical inscriptions, including “Her ways are ways of pleasantness”, reflecting contemporary moral and religious symbolism in estate landscaping.

== Bicton Park Botanical Gardens ==
Bicton Park Botanical Gardens is a visitor attraction occupying part of the historic Bicton estate. The site forms part of the wider park and gardens, which are included on the Register of Parks and Gardens at Grade I.

The gardens originated in the early 18th century and were subsequently developed in the late 18th and early 19th centuries, particularly under John Rolle, 1st Baron Rolle.

Today the site includes a range of visitor facilities, including historic glasshouses, a countryside museum, the Bicton Woodland Railway, and landscaped grounds with trails and recreational features.

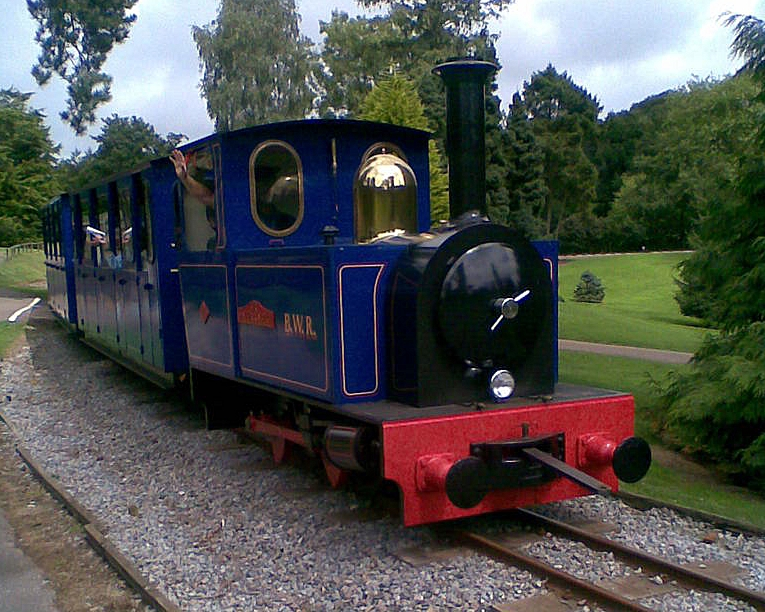
Bicton Woodland Railway at Bicton Park Botanical Gardens

The glasshouses were designed to recreate plant environments from different climatic regions. The Palm House, constructed in the 1820s, is an early example of curvilinear glasshouse design, using large numbers of small panes set in slender iron glazing bars. The Tropical House contains specimens of exotic plants, including the orchid Lemboglossum bictoniense, first flowered at Bicton in 1836 and named after the estate. The Arid House contains collections of cacti and other succulents displayed in a desert-style setting.
