= Toby Buckland =

English gardener and TV presenter (born 1969)

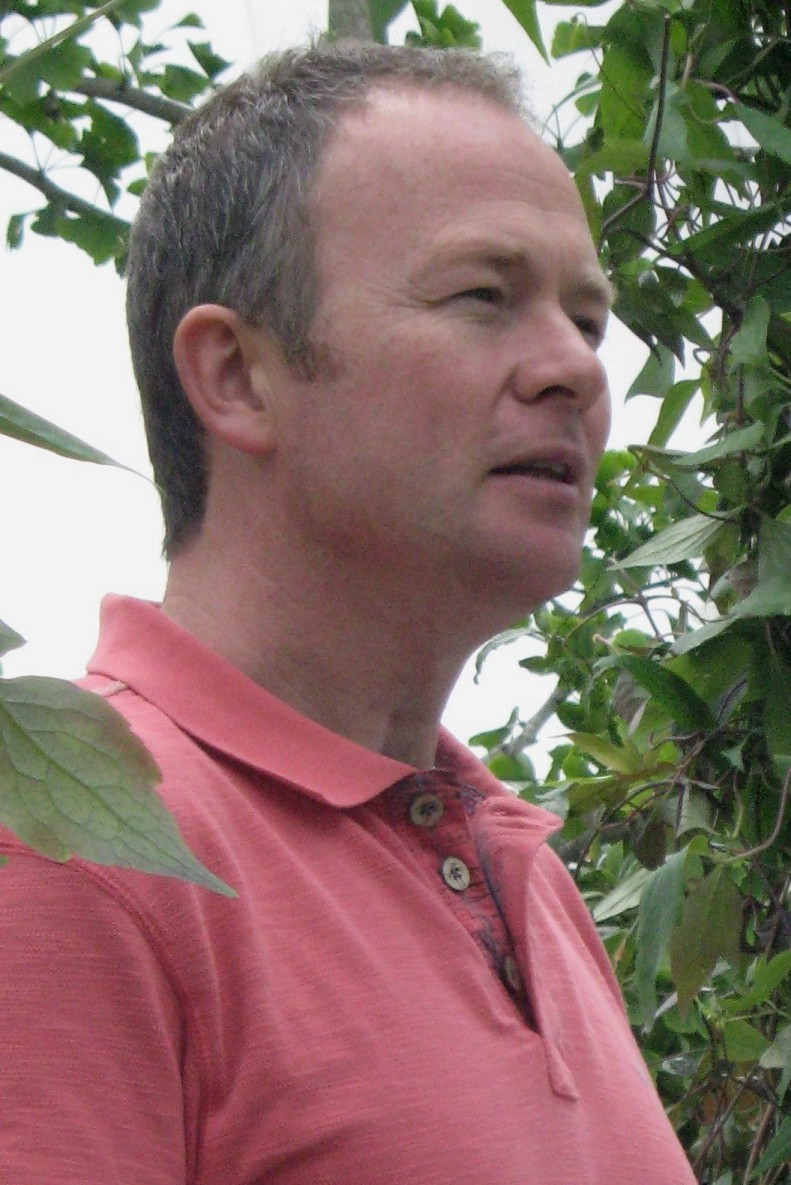
- Buckland in June 2009
- Born: Toby Neale Buckland; 11 October 1969 (age 56); Exeter, Devon, England
- Occupations: Broadcaster, Gardener, Author, radio presenter
- Years active: 1996–present
- Spouse: Lisa Buckland
- Children: 3
- Website: www.tobybuckland.com

Toby Neale Buckland (born 11 October 1969) is an English gardener, TV presenter and author, best known for being the main presenter from 2008 to 2010 of the BBC's long running flagship gardening programme Gardeners' World.

In 2008 Buckland won RHS Gold and Best in show for his Ethical Garden at Gardeners' World Live. In 2009 he won the Environmental Award from the Garden Media Guild for a Gardeners' World Special on peat in gardening.

In October 2011, Buckland launched an online plant nursery, Toby Buckland Nurseries, based at Powderham Castle in Devon.

== Biography and education ==
Born in Exeter, Devon, Buckland was brought up in the coastal towns of Dawlish and Kingswear. He trained as a nurseryman at Blyth's Devon Nursery and later Whetman's in Devon before studying horticulture, first at Bicton College, Budleigh Salterton, Devon and later Hadlow College of Horticulture and Agriculture, Hadlow, Kent where he trained in Landscape and Amenity management. During that time he spent a year as a horticultural trainee at the University of Cambridge Botanic Garden as a woodland supervisor.

Buckland opened a nursery at Powderham Castle, located in Devon, until a few years ago, now he and his wife hold a Garden festival there every year in April/May.

== Television ==
Buckland's first job in TV was in 1996 as a horticultural researcher for Brian Lapping Associates working on Channel 4's Garden Party. In 1998 he then joined the Granada Breeze channel as a gardening presenter which led to TV roles designing and building gardens on shows including Home Front in the Garden, Real Wrecks, Carol Vorderman's Better Homes on ITV and BBC1's Garden Magic.

He took over from Monty Don as the main presenter on the BBC flagship gardening programme Gardeners' World in August 2008. The format of the programme changed in various respects. In December 2010, the BBC announced that they would not be renewing Buckland's contract. Three years after recovering from a stroke, Monty Don returned as lead presenter of the show in March 2011.

On 31 December 2010 he appeared on BBC One's Celebrity Mastermind answering questions on Father Ted (scoring 12 with 1 Pass) and 22 overall with 2 more Passes, coming fourth. He donated his fee to the memorial garden which he designed for 45 Commando Royal Marines.

In May 2011 he appeared as a presenter of the BBC's coverage of the Royal Horticultural Society Chelsea Flower Show. In 2013, he presented two episodes of Great British Garden Revival.

== Radio presenting ==
Buckland hosts a gardening radio show on BBC Radio Devon and BBC Radio Cornwall, taking listeners gardening questions and playing music and quizzes.

== Other projects ==
Buckland has supported a variety of charities including Perennial, Greenfingers, Thrive and Hospiscare. He has recently designed a memorial garden for 45 Commando Royal Marines. Buckland also runs a garden festival with his wife, Lisa Buckland, at Powderham Castle, Exeter.

== Bibliography ==
Buckland has written a number of books, including:

- The Garden Makeover Book. Cassell Illustrated. 8 March 2001. ISBN 978-0-304-35894-6.
- Garden Boundaries. Laurel Glen Publishing. January 2003. ISBN 978-1-57145-823-0.
- 50 Weekend Garden Projects. Cassell Illustrated. 13 February 2003. ISBN 978-1-84403-062-0.
- How to Make Your Garden Grow. Mitchell Beazley. 2 March 2009. ISBN 978-1-84533-505-2.
- "Gardeners' World" Practical Gardening Handbook. BBC Books. 4 March 2010. ISBN 978-1-84607-854-5.
- BBC Gardeners' World Flowers: Planning and Planting for Continuous Colour April 2011 BBC Books | ISBN 978-1-84607-865-1
