= Rolliad =

1784–85 satire of Pitt the Younger

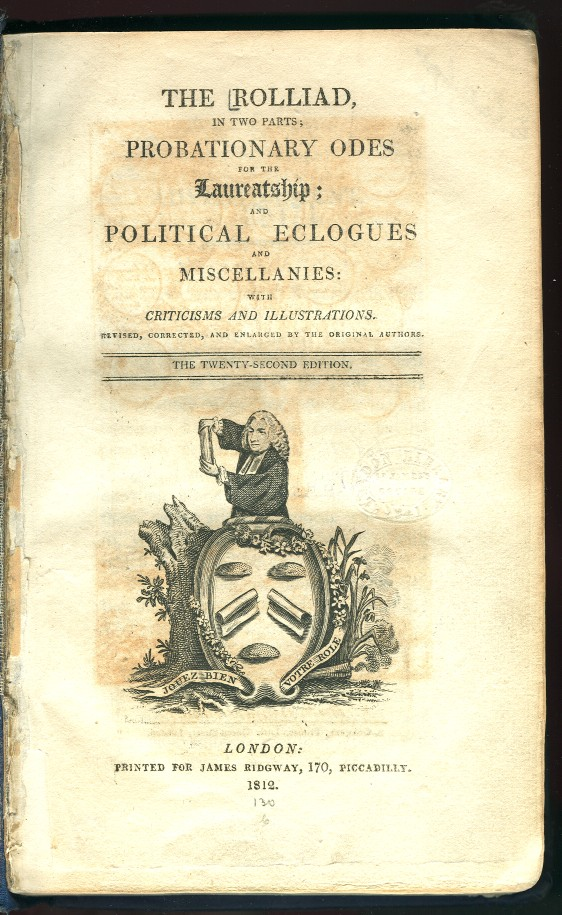
Title page of J. Ridgway's printing of the Rolliad from 1812. The drawing has several puns on the name 'Rolle' including the punning motto "Jouez bien votre role".

The Rolliad, in full Criticisms on the Rolliad, is a work of British satire directed principally at the administration of William Pitt the Younger. It was written and originally published in serial form in the Morning Herald in 1784–85, and its authors also contributed ancillary satires which were published together with it.

== Structure of the Rolliad ==
The satire takes the form of a piece of literary criticism of an epic poem called The Rolliad which is extensively quoted. The subject of the poem is John Rolle, MP for Devon, who is being guided around Parliament by Merlin who introduces the leading personalities to him. Rolle, despite the fact that he was not a constant supporter of Pitt, was picked out for ridicule by the authors after he shouted down Edmund Burke in the House of Commons. The authors claimed his descent from the Norman Rollo of Normandy.

== Authors ==
The Rolliad was a collaborative work and the authors remained anonymous. Joseph Richardson, a journalist, was the principal writer; George Ellis (an antiquary), Richard Tickell (a librettist) and French Laurence (Regius Professor of Civil Law at Oxford) also contributed. There were contributors from the field of politics including Richard FitzPatrick who was very close to Charles James Fox and Lord John Townshend, a former Minister.

== Satirical targets ==
In addition to the eponymous Rolle, the Rolliad attacked Pitt for his consumption of port and for having no relationships with women:

'Tis true, indeed, we oft abuse him,
Because he bends to no man;
But Slander's self dares not accuse him
Of stiffness to a woman.

Pitt was also ridiculed for his youth:

Above the rest, majestically great,
Behold the infant Atlas of the state,
The matchless miracle of modern days,
In whom Britannia to the world displays
A sight to make surrounding nations stare;
A kingdom trusted to a school-boy's care.

Pitt's ally Henry Dundas was attacked for his dissoluteness. Charles Jenkinson also had perhaps more than his fair share of criticism.
