= John Rolle, 1st Baron Rolle =

British politician and peer

The Right Honourable The Lord Rolle
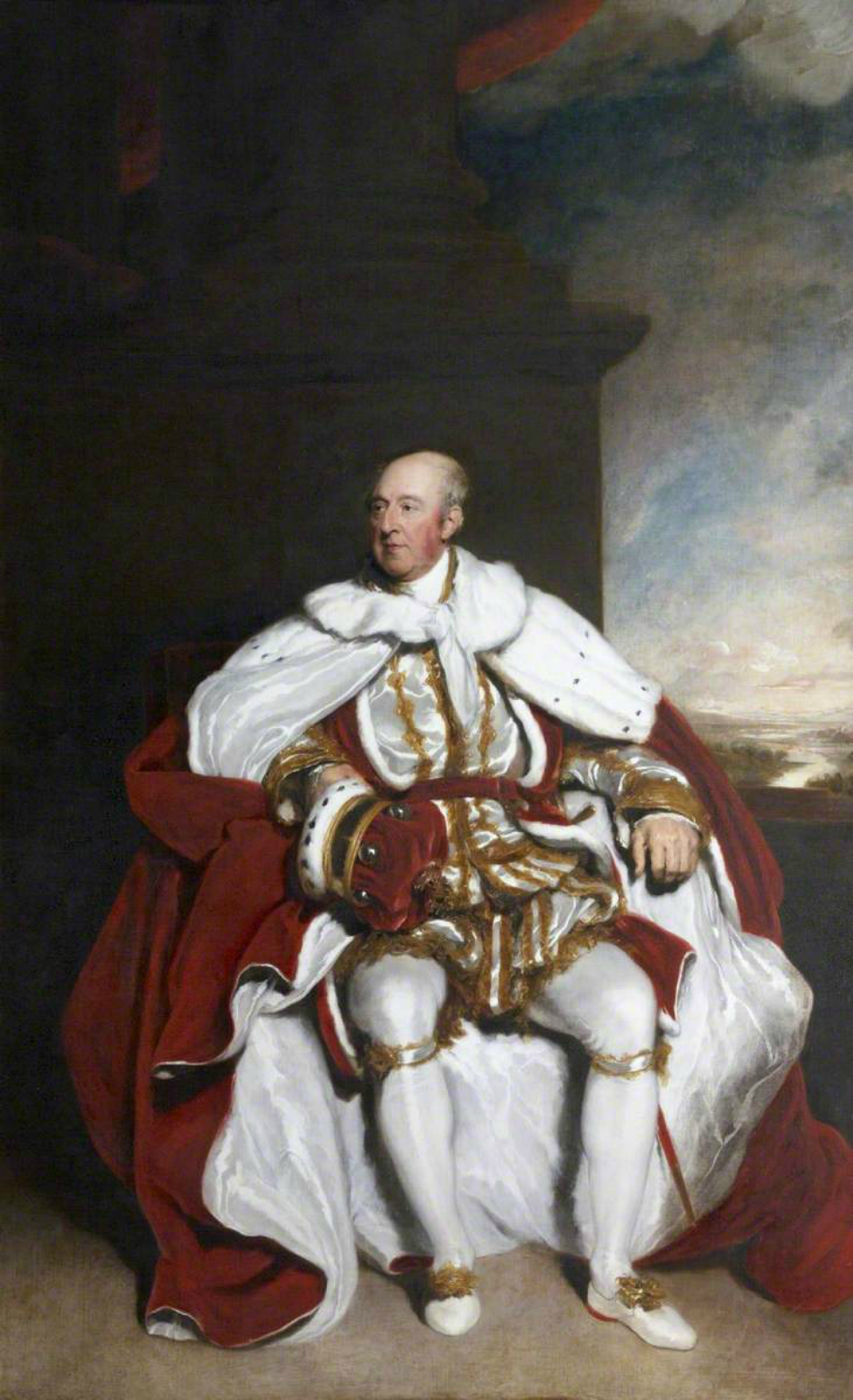
- John Rolle, 1st Baron Rolle (1750–1842) in his peerage robes. Portrait by Thomas Lawrence (1769–1830). Collection of Great Torrington Almshouse, Town Lands and Poors Charities, displayed in Great Torrington Town Hall. Donated by Lord Clinton.

Member of Parliament for Devon
- In office 1780-1796

Personal details
- Born: c. 1750 England
- Died: April 30, 1842 (aged 91–92) Bicton, Devon, England
- Spouse(s): Judith Walrond (d. 1819) Louisa Trefusis (m. 1822)
- Parent: Denys Rolle (father)
- Relatives: Henry Rolle (uncle); John Rolle Walter (uncle); John Rolle (grandfather)
- Education: Emmanuel College, Cambridge
- Military career
- Rank: Colonel
- Commands: South Devon Militia; Royal 1st Devon Yeomanry; North Devon Yeomanry

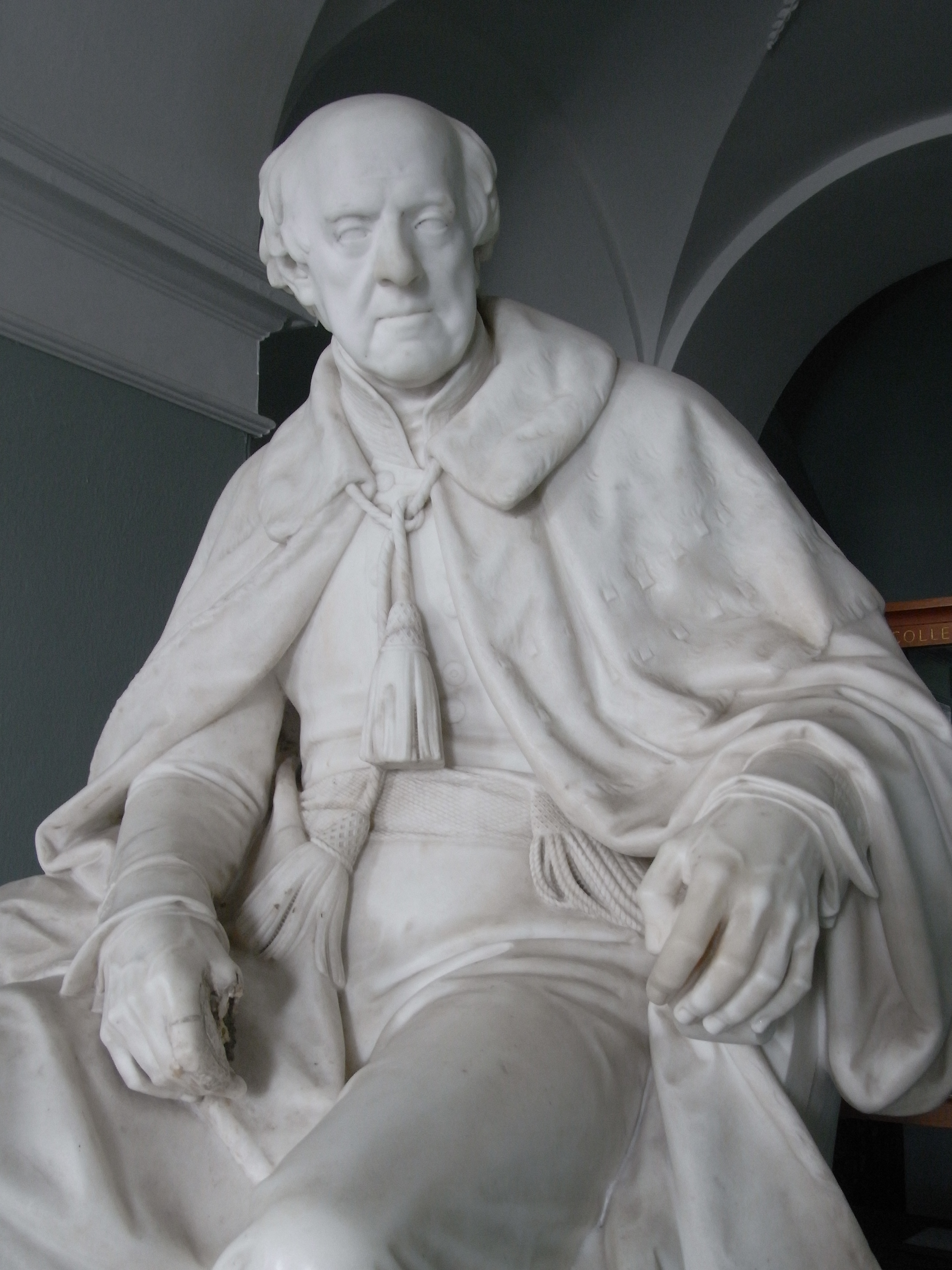
Sculpture of Lord Rolle (died 1842), inscribed on plinth: "E.B. Stephens sculp. London 1844", in entrance hall of Bicton House, Exeter, Devon. By Edward Bowring Stephens (1815–1882); exhibited at the Royal Academy, London, as: "A marble statue of the late Lord Rolle in the robe worn at the coronation of Her Majesty the Queen". An identical earlier version dated 1843 exists in the entrance hall of Lupton House, Brixham, the home of John Yarde-Buller, 1st Baron Churston (1799–1871)

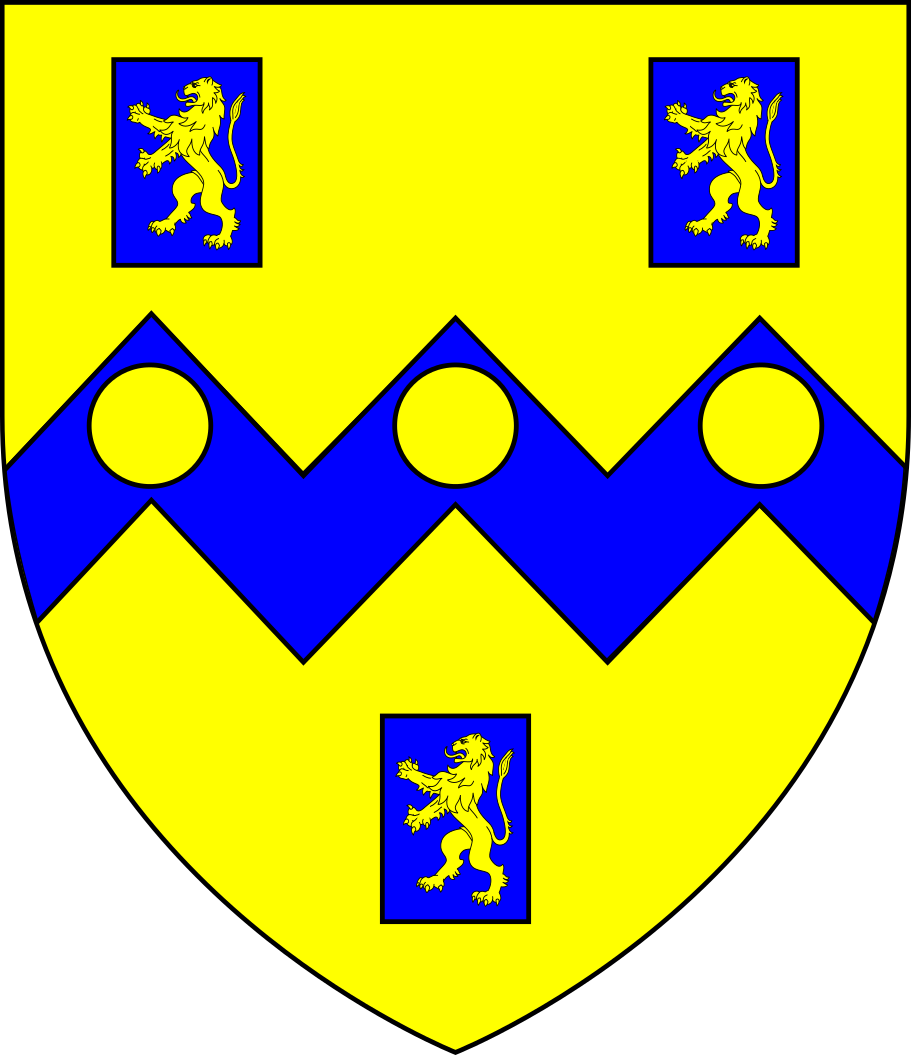
Arms of Rolle: Or, on a fesse dancetté between three billets azure each charged with a lion rampant of the first three bezants

John Rolle, 1st Baron Rolle (1750 (Note: Date of birth uncertain: mural monument in St Giles Church, St Giles in the Wood states he "died without issue the 3rd of April 1842 aged 92", which suggests a birth year of 1750. John Rolle was baptised on 6 Oct 1751 in Chittlehampton. Other sources state birthdate as 16 October 1756.) – 3 April 1842) was a British politician and peer who served as a Member of Parliament in general support of William Pitt the Younger and was later an active member of the House of Lords. His violent attacks on Edmund Burke and Charles James Fox in the early 1780s led to his being the target for satirical attack in the Rolliad. He was colonel of the South Devon Militia and was instrumental in forming the Royal 1st Devon Yeomanry and the North Devon Yeomanry.

Rolle was a slave owner, and at emancipation he presented his estate on the island of Exuma in the Bahamas in perpetuity to his freed slaves, whose descendants still lived in what became known as Rolleville as late as the 1920s.

He was the largest landowner in Devon, with about 55,000 acres centred on his seats of Stevenstone in the north and Bicton House in the south-east, (Note: As disclosed regarding the landholding of his heir Mark Rolle in the Return of Owners of Land, 1873 survey.) and thus was highly influential in that county. He promoted and financed several large engineering projects, including the Rolle Canal in North Devon, Rolle Quay in Pottington, Barnstaple, and two road bridges over the River Torridge near Torrington, at Town Mills and Weare Giffard and the sea-wall at Exmouth. (Note: Exmouth works mentioned as uncompleted in his will. His will mentioned his plan for constructing a harbour at Beer, Cornwall, later cancelled in a codicil.) He was an active donor to charitable works in Devon, being patron of his family's almshouses at Livery Dole, Exeter, Otterton, Great Torrington and St Giles in the Wood and of two schools in Otterton. (Note: Mentioned in his will.) Physically he was a large man, and made no pretension to an intellectual approach. Nathaniel William Wraxall wrote of him: "Nature had denied him all pretension to grace or elegance. Neither was his understanding apparently more cultivated than his manners were refined. He reminded me always of a Devonshire rustic, but he possessed plain common sense, a manly mind, and the faculty of stating his ideas in a few strong words." In later life he caused a disturbance at the coronation of Queen Victoria when he fell on the stairs of the throne.

== Origins ==
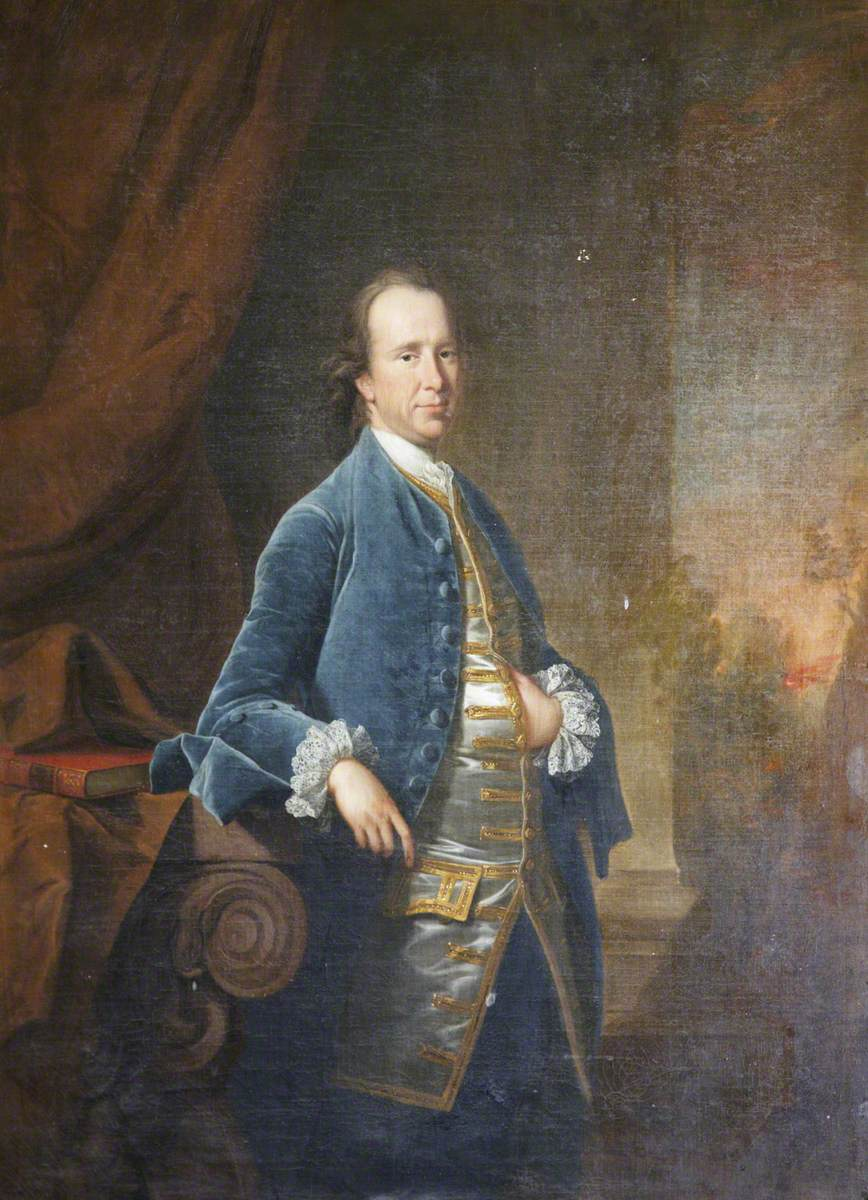
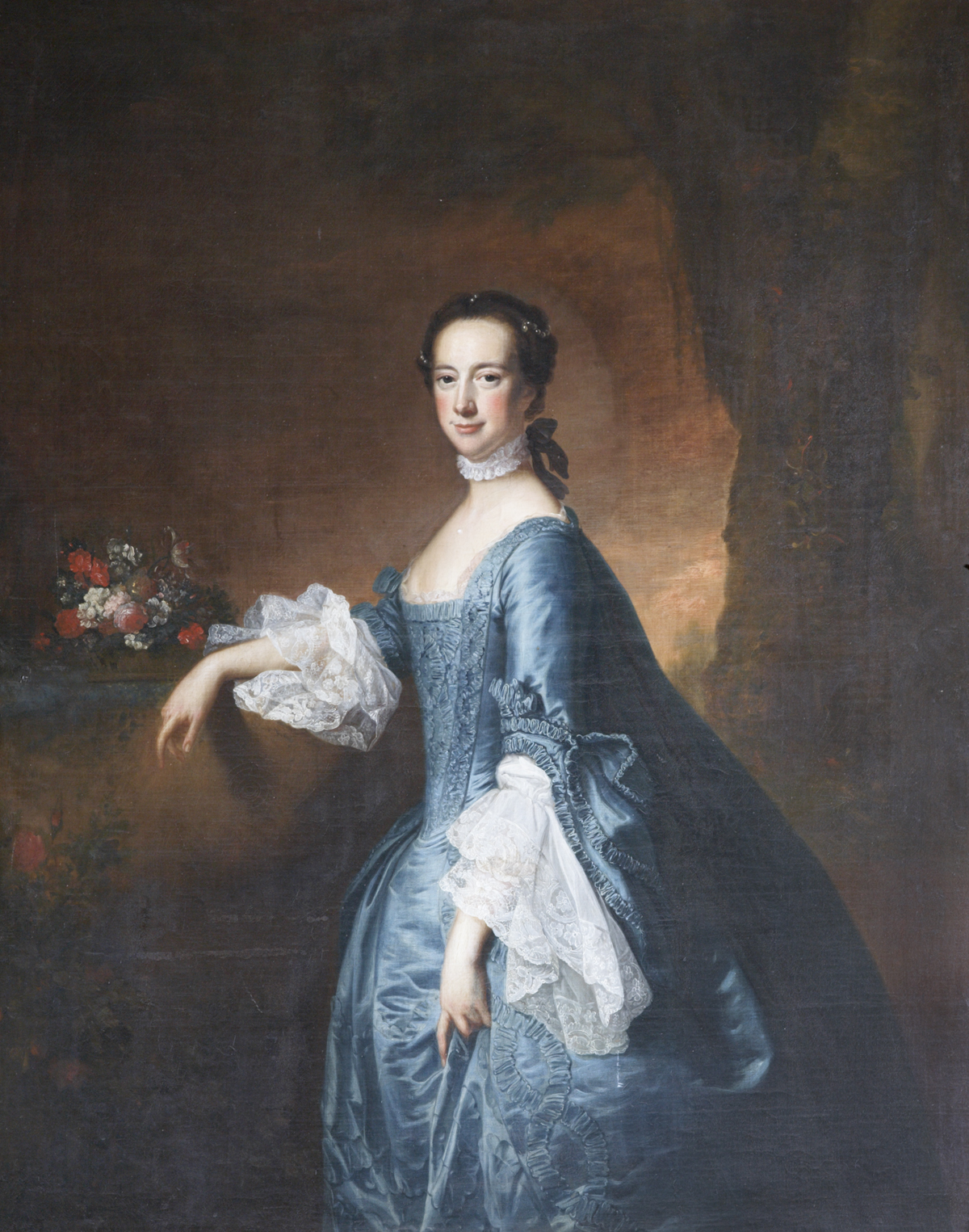
The parents of Lord Rolle, matching portraits by Thomas Hudson (1701–1779): Denys Rolle (1725–1797) of Hudscott, Chittlehampton, and his wife Anne Chichester (died 1781). Collection of Great Torrington Almshouse, Town Lands and Poors Charities, formerly the property of Hon. Mark Rolle (died 1907) of Stevenstone and donated by his heir Lord Clinton (Note: Some of the paintings, notably that by Batoni of John Rolle Walter, are visible hanging in a corridor at Stevenstone as shown in a photograph from the sales particulars for the estate.)

John Rolle was the only son of Denys Rolle (1725–1797), of Hudscott, Chittlehampton, Devon, (Note: Per text of 1772 marriage settlement: "Whereas a marriage hath been lately agreed upon between John Rolle the only son of Denys Rolle of Hudscott in the county of Devon, esquire, and Judith Maria Walrond...") by his wife Anne Chichester (born 1721), a daughter by his second wife of Arthur Chichester (1670–1737/8) of Hall, Bishop's Tawton, Devon, a junior line of the prolific Chichester family of Raleigh, Pilton. Denys Rolle owned large estates in Florida which he attempted to colonise and was heir to his elder brother John Rolle Walter (1712–1779), MP, of Bicton and Stevenstone, both sons of John Rolle (1679–1730), MP, of Bicton and Stevenstone. On 27 July 1781 Denys "Walter" Esq. obtained royal licence "to take the surname and bear the arms of Rolle, pursuant to the will of the late John Rolle Walter Esq. of Stevenstone". His brother John Rolle Walter (died 1779) had become the heir of his uncle Sir Robert Walter, 4th Baronet (1680–1731) and had been required to adopt the surname of Walter. Denys Rolle (died 1797) had been left Hudscott and the lordship of the manor of Chittlehampton by his distant childless cousin Samuel Rolle (died 1747), only son of Samuel Rolle (1669–1735), MP, by his wife Dorothy Lovering. Samuel Rolle (died 1735) had himself inherited Hudscott from his mother Jane Lovering. He was the son of Dennis Rolle (died 1671) of Great Torrington (whose tombstone exists in Torrington Church), the younger brother of Robert Rolle (died 1660), MP, who had married Lady Arabella Clinton, both sons of Sir Samuel Rolle I (died 1647), of Heanton Satcheville, MP for Barnstaple.

== Career ==
He was educated at Winchester College and Emmanuel College, Cambridge, and became a country gentleman in Devon. He lived at Tidwell, within the family owned manor of East Budleigh on the south Devon coast, certainly between 1786 and 1796. The estate of Tidwell had been purchased by the Walrond family in about 1730, and hence it may have been the property of Rolle's first wife Maria Walrond. This Georgian country house is now a hotel, in the renamed parish of Budleigh Salterton. When his uncle John Rolle Walter died in November 1779, he was put forward to take up his seat in parliament. At this time, the seat of Devon was controlled by a group of large landowners principally in the families of Courtenay of Powderham, Bampfylde of Poltimore and Rolle, who had so many supporters that no other challenge was possible. Due to the prohibitive expense of mounting an opposition, the county had not seen a contested election since 1712. Rolle was duly elected unopposed on 4 January 1780.

== House of Commons ==
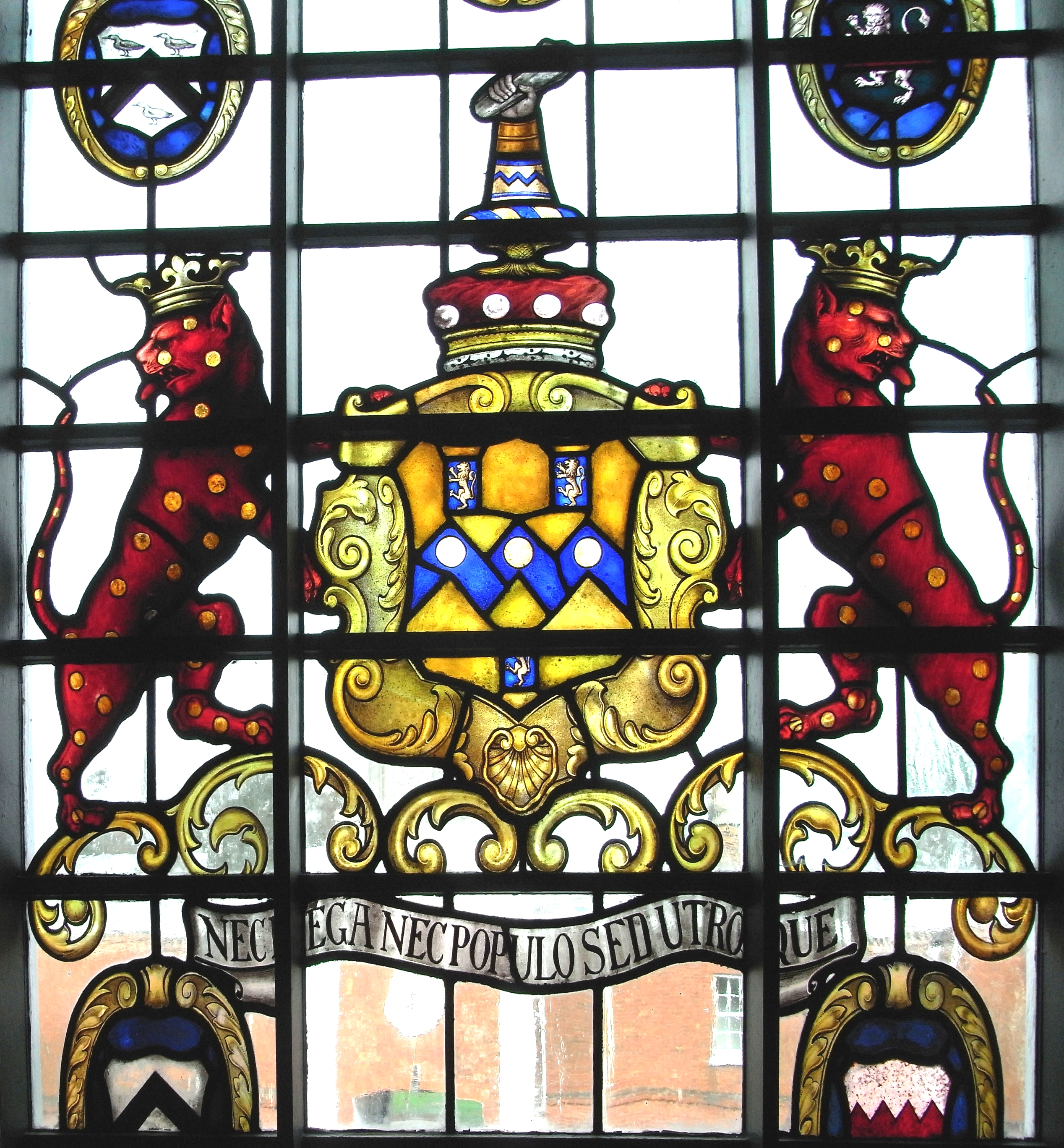
Heraldic achievement of Lord Rolle (died 1842) in first-floor window at top of grand staircase, Bicton House. Motto: Nec Reg(in)a Nec Populo Sed Utroque ("Not with the Queen, not with the People, but with each"). Arms: Or, on a fesse indented azure between three billets of the second each charged with a lion rampant of the first three bezants. The canting crest is a dexter cubit arm holding in the hand a roll of parchment, the crests of earlier family members hold a baton (Chittlehampton Church) or a flint-stone (Library Room, Stevenstone). Sable, a chevron between three hands grasping a stone argent were the canting arms of the mediaeval de Stevenstone family of Stevenstone

Because of the control of his county, Rolle was not under any political obligations. Although his family were traditionally Tory, Rolle was not a reliable vote for the Tory Prime Minister of the day, Lord North. He sometimes supported the government but just as often opposed it. However, following North's resignation, Rolle developed a vehement dislike of Charles James Fox for recalling George Rodney to a Naval command. When Fox, attempting to delay Parliamentary proceedings to get in more of his supporters, put off the Call of the House, Rolle attacked his supporters' unpunctuality.

He supported the Shelburne government's peace proposals in 1783, although he had not been a consistent supporter of that ministry (being rated by Robinson, the Parliamentary manager, as 'doubtful'). During the Fox-North Coalition, Rolle was appalled when Edmund Burke reappointed two Pay Office officials called Powell and Bembridge who were under suspicion of embezzlement, and made vituperative attacks until Burke agreed to accept their resignations.

== Military career ==
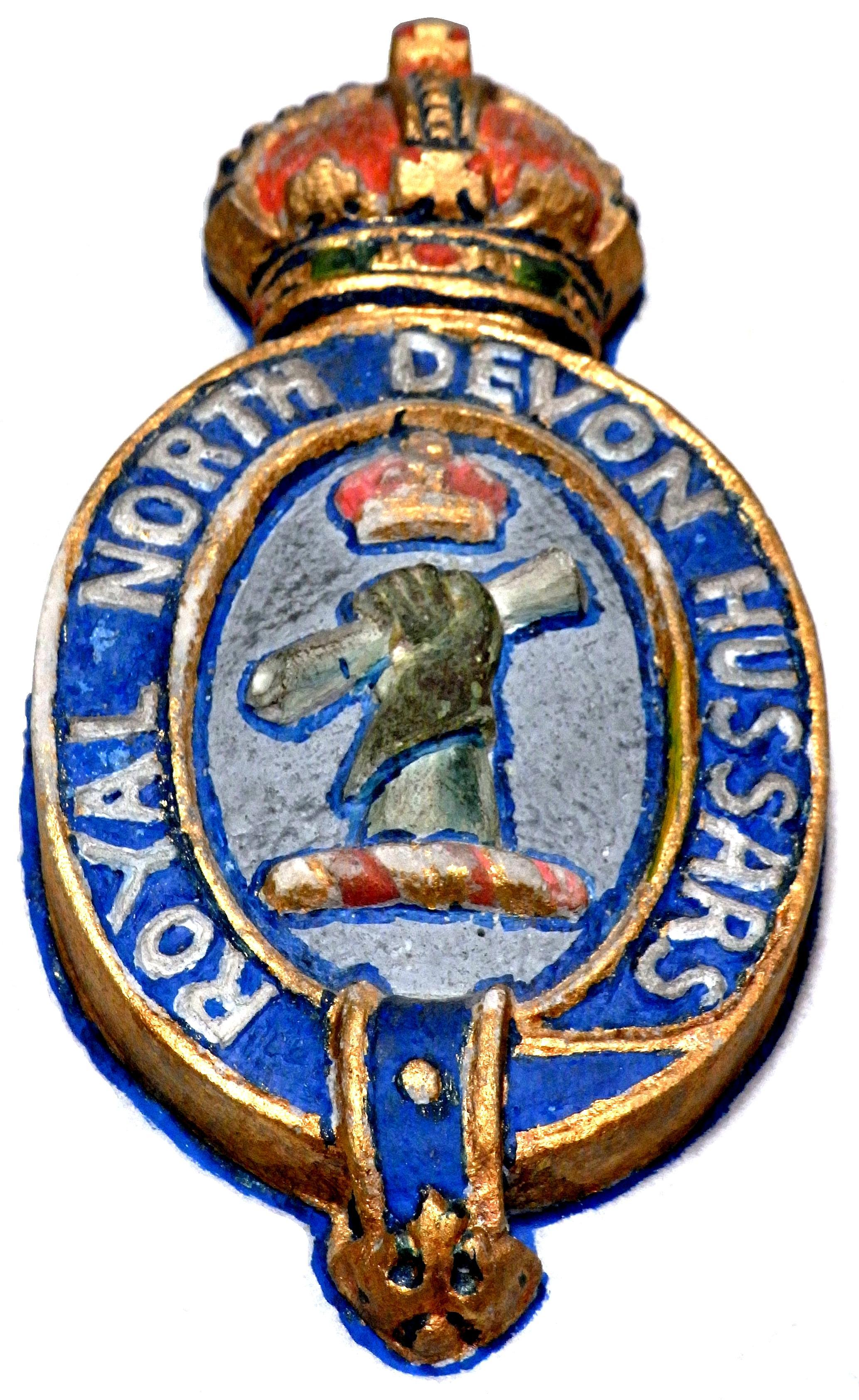
Badge of Royal North Devon Hussars, as seen on framed mural monument in Exford Church, Somerset, to Major Morland Greig (1864–1915), of Edgcott, Exford, Master of the Devon and Somerset Staghounds, killed in action at Gallipoli. The badge is derived from the crest of John Rolle, 1st Baron Rolle (died 1842), of Stevenstone, who played a significant role in raising the predecessor regiment: A cubit arm erect vested or charged with a fess indented double cotised azure in the hand a roll of parchment. The badge is also shown, but with the hand grasping a palm frond, sculpted on the mural monument in the Church of St Giles in the Wood, Devon, to Captain John Oliver Clemson (1882–1915) of Stevenstone, also killed fighting with the same regiment at Gallipoli. He had purchased Stevenstone after the death of Mark Rolle

John Rolle joined the South Devon Militia as an ensign and in 1796 as its commanding officer he took it to Ireland to help to suppress the rising which occurred when Britain was at war with France.

On his return to Devon he displayed a great interest in the Volunteer Cavalry known as the Yeomanry, and in 1801 he was instrumental in reorganising various south Devon independent units into the Royal 1st Devon Yeomanry, and in 1802 he instituted another corps of north Devon units into the North Devon Yeomanry (later designated the Royal North Devon Hussars) under his command.

In February 1812 it appears Lord Rolle led his regiment to Nottingham as part of a larger force to suppress a Luddite rebellion. During the march his quartermaster-serjeant Richard I Braginton (1752–1812) died suddenly at Leicester, and Rolle erected a gravestone to his memory in St Martin's Church, Leicester inscribed thus:

"Beneath are deposited the remains of Richard Braginton Quarter Master Serjeant of the South Devon Militia who expir'd suddenly in this Town on his march to Nottingham (Note: "The Regiment of Militia of which the 7th South Devon Battalion probably formed a company was in the area due to serious rioting by workers (Luddites) when more machinery was introduced to manufacturing industries (i.e. job losses). The Militia had previously been in the South East district guarding French prisoners. Extract from a letter to Ken Robinson dated 16 Apr 1993 from L J Murphy Museum Attendant for Curator, The Regimental Headquarters, The Devonshire and Dorset Regiment, Myvern Barracks, Exeter EX2 6AE".) in the night of 15th of February 1812 after retiring to rest in perfect health AGED 60 YEARS He served 40 in the said Regiment with unabated Zeal, diligence and Loyalty to his King; and firm attachment to his Country; While his private conduct was equally commendable. For Rectitude, Probity and Sobriety He was esteem'd by his Officers and beloved by his fellow Soldiers. To perpetuate the remembrance of his worth, This stone was caus'd to be erected By his Colonel Lord ROLLE. Reader! may this additional Example of the awful uncertainty of Life prove a warning to thee to prepare for a similar fate, by a faithful discharge of the duties of thy station; and by an humble reliance on the merits of thy Redeemer."

Rolle appointed his son Richard II Braginton (1784–1869) as steward of Stevenstone, and the latter's son George Braginton (1808–1886), a merchant and banker, mayor of Great Torrington, was in 1830 Lord Rolle's agent for the Rolle Canal of which he purchased a lease in 1852, ten years after Lord Rolle's death.

At the age of 90 Rolle had sufficient vitality to ride at the head of the 1st Devon Yeomanry at its annual inspection.

== The Rolliad ==
The violence of his attack led the supporters of Fox and Burke to make him the chief object of the Rolliad, which purported to be a literary criticism of an epic poem but was actually a vehicle used by the authors to insult all their opponents. The dedication of the Rolliad reads:

Illustrious ROLLE! O may thy honour'd name
Roll down distinguish'd on the rolls of fame!
Still first be found on Devon's county polls!
Still future Senates boast their future ROLLES!

It gives a spoof pedigree of the Rolle family, which cannot in reality be traced further back than 16th-century Dorset, as sprung from "Rollo, Duke of the Normans". Although Rolle seemed to be an opponent of Fox, he was not a true supporter of Pitt. He opposed Pitt on parliamentary reform and on the Duke of Richmond's fortifications plan, and was a member of the St. Alban's Tavern group which tried to create a united Ministry involving both Pitt and Fox. He consistently described himself as an "independent country gentleman".

== Regency crisis ==
Rolle backed Pitt on the regency crisis in 1789, making a direct attack on the Prince of Wales' relations with Maria Fitzherbert which was thought inappropriate by the Whigs. Rolle responded by saying that he would have made the same speech if the whole House was against him. In the general election in 1790 he was forced into a token contest against a Bampfylde Whig and declared his "firm attachment to Mr Pitt, founded on personal esteem as well as public principles", and was returned with a healthy majority.

His opposition to Parliamentary reform continued and intensified due to the French Revolution of 1789; he spoke against Thomas Paine's doctrines and supported the repressive legislation aimed at damping down revolutionary sentiment in Britain. He supported moves to abolish slavery and campaigned for a reduction of duty on horses (suggesting a heavy tax on the employment of foreign servants be used to replace the revenue). He bestowed all of his significant land holdings in Exuma, Bahamas, to his slaves, in gratitude for which a number of towns on Great Exuma have been named after him, such as Rolleville and Rolletown. A large proportion of the inhabitants today are surnamed Rolle, some of the famous ones amongst whom are Esther Rolle, actress; Myron Rolle and Magnum Rolle, American football and basketball players respectively.

== Peerage ==
The 1790s saw him attempting to obtain a peerage for himself or his father who had returned to the life of an English country gentleman after the failure of his American colonisation schemes. His father was uninterested but Pitt made a firm promise to Rolle himself, so long as a problematic by-election in Devon was not thereby caused by his removal to the House of Lords. At the dissolution of Parliament in 1796, Rolle was duly ennobled as Baron Rolle, of Stevenstone in the County of Devon.

In 1797 Rolle's father died and he inherited all of the family's extensive estates, which were reckoned in 1809 to be worth £70,000 per annum. He was an active member of the House of Lords, and became increasingly conservative: he was one of 22 'stalwarts' to vote against the third reading of the Reform Bill of 1832. During a parliamentary debate in July 1834 the Lord Chancellor, Lord Brougham, attacked Rolle in a speech. When Brougham sat down, Rolle came up to him at the Woolsack and told him: "My Lord, I wish you to know that I have the greatest contempt for you both in this House and out of it".

== Coronation accident ==
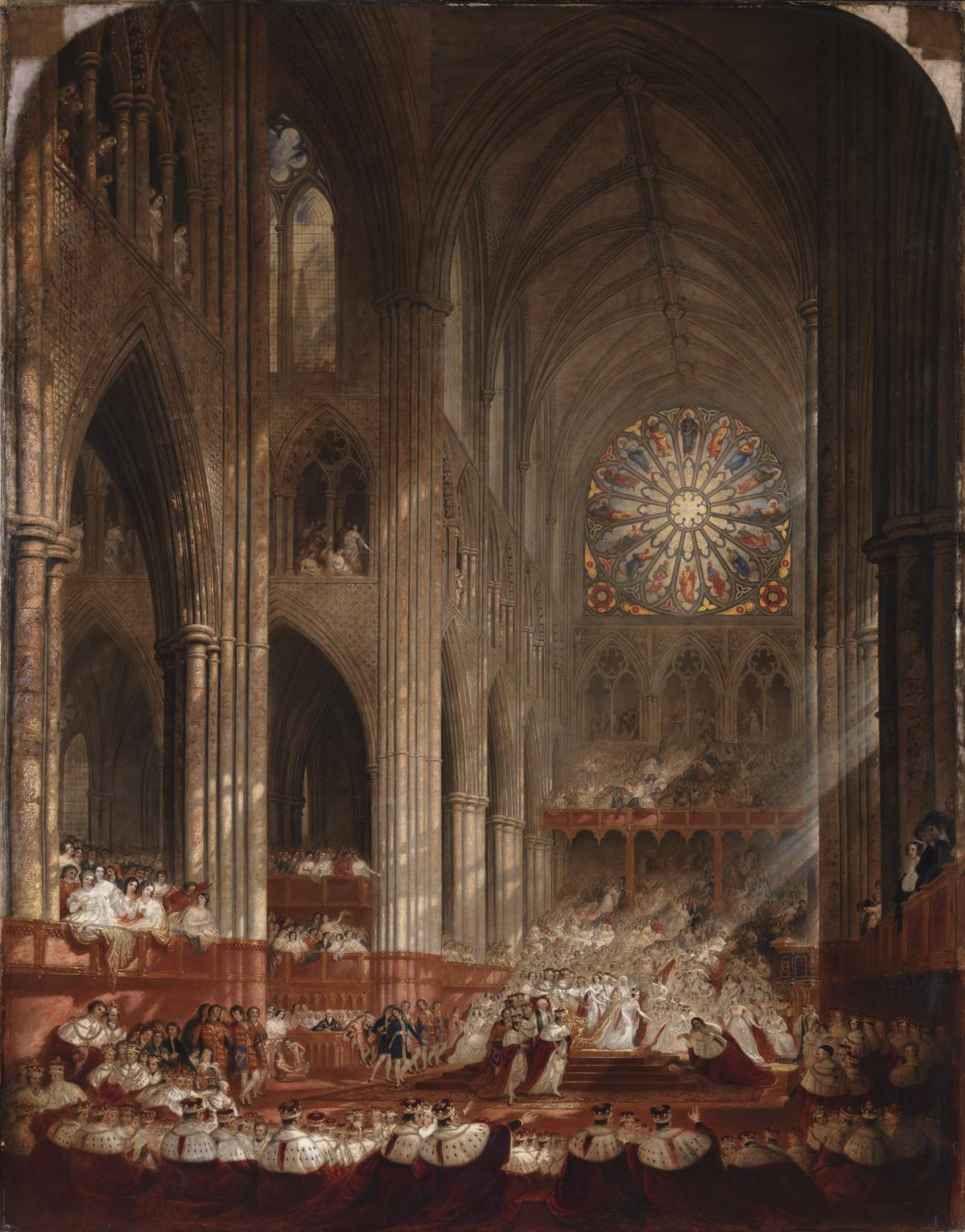
The Coronation of Queen Victoria by John Martin, 1839 — The painting depicts the accident of Lord Rolle falling on the steps of the Throne

On 28 June 1838, the infirm Lord Rolle attended the coronation of Queen Victoria. What happened was later described by the Queen in her diary:

Poor old Ld Rolls [sic], who is 82 [sic] and dreadfully infirm, in attempting to ascend the steps fell and rolled quite down, but was not the least hurt; when he attempted to re-ascend them I got up and advanced to the end of the steps in order to prevent another fall.

The diarist Charles Greville, who was present at the coronation, described the scene:

[Lord Rolle] fell down as he was getting up the steps of the throne. Her first impulse was to rise, and when afterwards he came again to do homage she said, "May I not get up and meet him?" and then rose from the throne and advanced down one or two of the steps to prevent his coming up, an act of graciousness and kindness which made a great sensation. It is, in fact, the remarkable union of naïveté, kindness, nature, good-nature, with propriety and dignity, which makes her so admirable and so endearing to those about her, as she certainly is.

The incident is also included in the latter part of the tenth verse of Richard Harris Barham's Mr. Barney Maguire's Account of the Coronation:

Then the trumpets braying, and the organ playing,
And the sweet trombones, with their silver tones;
But Lord Rolle was rolling;— t'was mighty consoling
To think his Lordship did not break his bones!

== Building and engineering works ==
Lord Rolle constructed several major engineering works and other buildings including:

- New road at Beaford, opened in 1829.
- Town Mills, Great Torrington, built in mock-castle style, with corner towers, octagonal turret chimney and crenellated walls.
- Rolle Canal in North Devon, 6 miles between Torrington and Landcross. Associated works included a limekiln at Rosemoor, situated at the termination of the canal. In 1826 during the construction he ordered that "500 trees that are in the line are to be taken down, and two lime kilns, for the service of the farmers, are to be built".
- Rolle Quay in his manor of Pottington, Pilton, next to Barnstaple, on the River Yeo. In 1830 he also built a sea wall at Pottington.
- Two road bridges over the River Torridge near Torrington, at Town Mills and Half-penny Bridge at Weare Giffard.
- Sea-wall at Exmouth. (Note: Exmouth works mentioned as uncompleted in his will. His will mentioned his plan for constructing a harbour at Beer, Cornwall, later cancelled in a codicil.) Begun in 1841 and completed in 1842, under the direction of John Smeaton. Built of limestone, 1,800 feet long, 22 ft high, containing 70,000 cubic feet of stone, protected by a row of piles 12 feet long.
- Chapel of the Holy Trinity, Budleigh Salterton, built by Lord Rolle in 1812 at the crossroads of Chapel Hill and East Terrace, as a chapel of ease to the parish church of his manor of East Budleigh. He referred to it in his will as "my chapel at Budleigh Salterton" and bequeathed the advowson to his wife, assuming she should continue to reside at Bicton. In 1891 Mark Rolle built the larger church of St Peter on a new site to meet the need of the expanded town.
- Holy Trinity Chapel, Exmouth, built in 1824 to design of John Lethbridge. His widow added a chancel in 1856. Contains a 1907 memorial to Mark Rolle.
- Exmouth: Louisa Terrace (1824) and Bicton Place, terraces of red brick and stucco Georgian houses to south and north respectively of Holy Trinity Church, in the vicinity of "The Beacon".
- Market House, Exmouth (1830).
- Exmouth: plantations and walks under the Beacon.
- National School, Great Torrington, built by Lord Rolle circa 1835, attended by about 150 children in 1850.
- Rebuilding of part of the ancient Torrington Castle including battlements. Lord Rolle was lord of the manor of Great Torrington and nominally feudal baron of the ancient barony, (Note: Purchased from Sir John Fortescue.) effectively abolished by the Tenures Abolition Act 1660.

== Estates purchased ==
- Woodland, Little Torrington, across the River Torridge from South Healand, on the Stevenstone estate. Joseph Coplestone sold Woodland to Henry Stevens, Esq., of Cross, Little Torrington, who sold it to the Very Rev. Joseph Palmer, Dean of Cashel, who sold it to Lord Rolle.

== Marriages ==
Rolle married twice, neither of which marriages produced any offspring.

=== First marriage ===
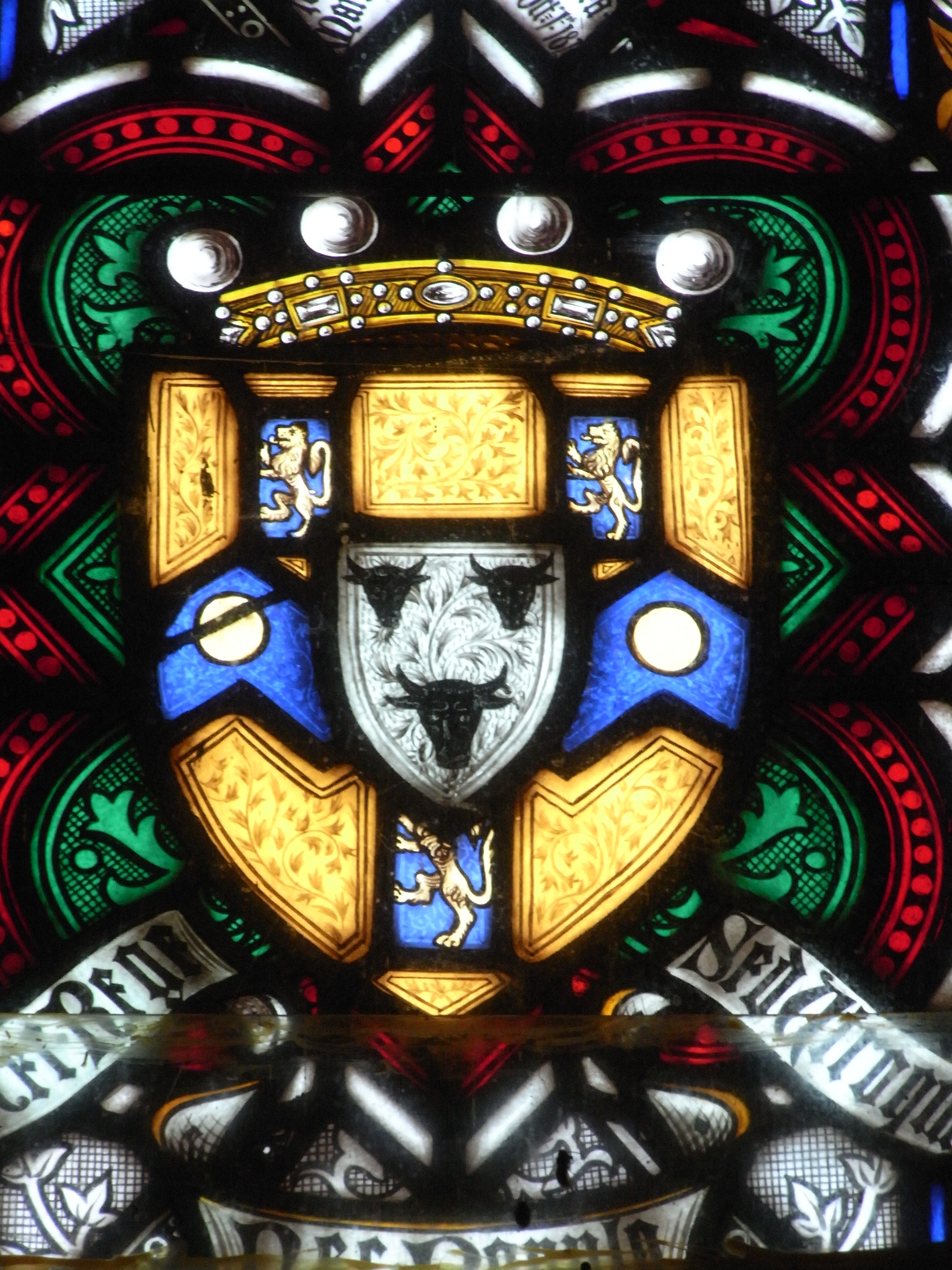
Stained glass armorial, Lord Rolle memorial window, north transept, Bicton Church, built 1850 by Louisa Trefusis. The arms are Rolle with an inescutcheon of pretence of Walrond: Argent, three bull's heads affronte sable. This marshalling indicates that Judith Walrond was an heraldic heiress, the sole heiress of her father, and that the Walrond lands had descended to Rolle

He was aged 20 1/2, therefore legally still a minor not having reached his majority of 21, when his father arranged for him to marry the 17-year-old Judith Maria Walrond. She was the daughter and heiress, by his wife Sarah Oke, of William Walrond, by then deceased, of Bovey House, Beer, between Beer (near Seaton) and Branscombe on the south Devon coast, thus near Bicton. The Walronds were a prominent and ancient Devon family, the main branch of which was seated at Bradfield House, Uffculme, which after the 1860 extensions became one of the largest mansions in Devon. The family had held the manor of Beer since the 13th century. Lord Rolle's adoptive heir Hon. Mark Rolle (died 1907) later rebuilt the large parish church of Beer. Rolle's father and Judith's mother procured an Act of Parliament in 1772 enabling the two minors to settle their prospective entailed inheritances into a marriage settlement, the beneficiaries being the offspring of the marriage. However no children resulted and Judith died in 1819.

=== Second marriage ===
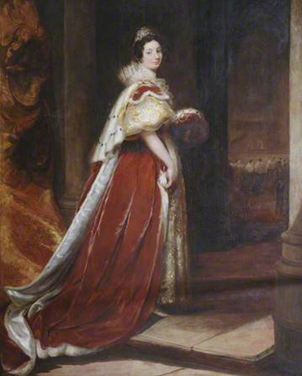
Lady Rolle (née Hon. Louisa Trefusis) (1794–1885), second wife of John Rolle, 1st Baron Rolle (1750–1842) in her peerage robes. Portrait by Thomas Lawrence (1769–1830), collection of Great Torrington Almshouse, Town Lands and Poors Charities, donated by Lord Clinton

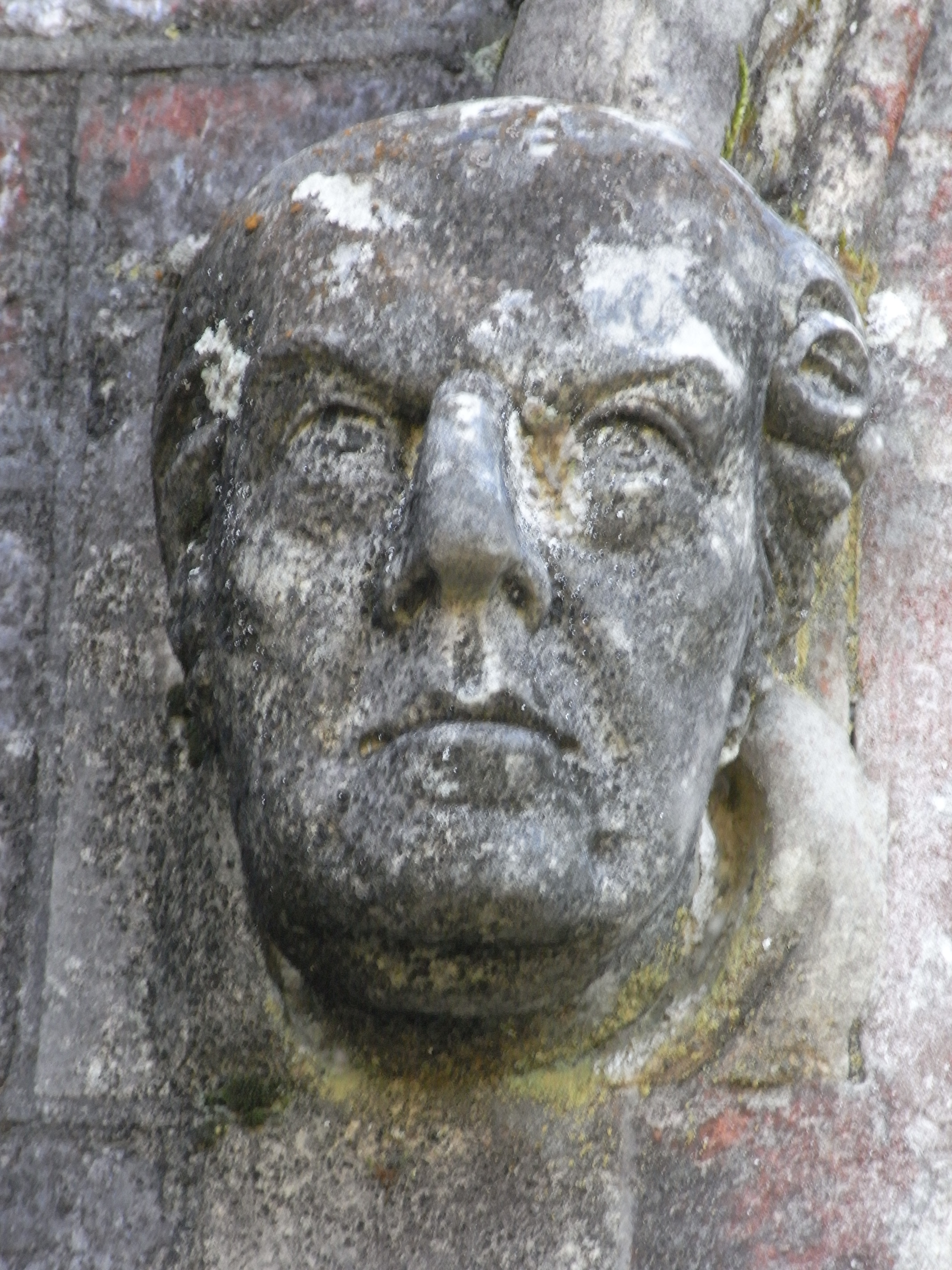
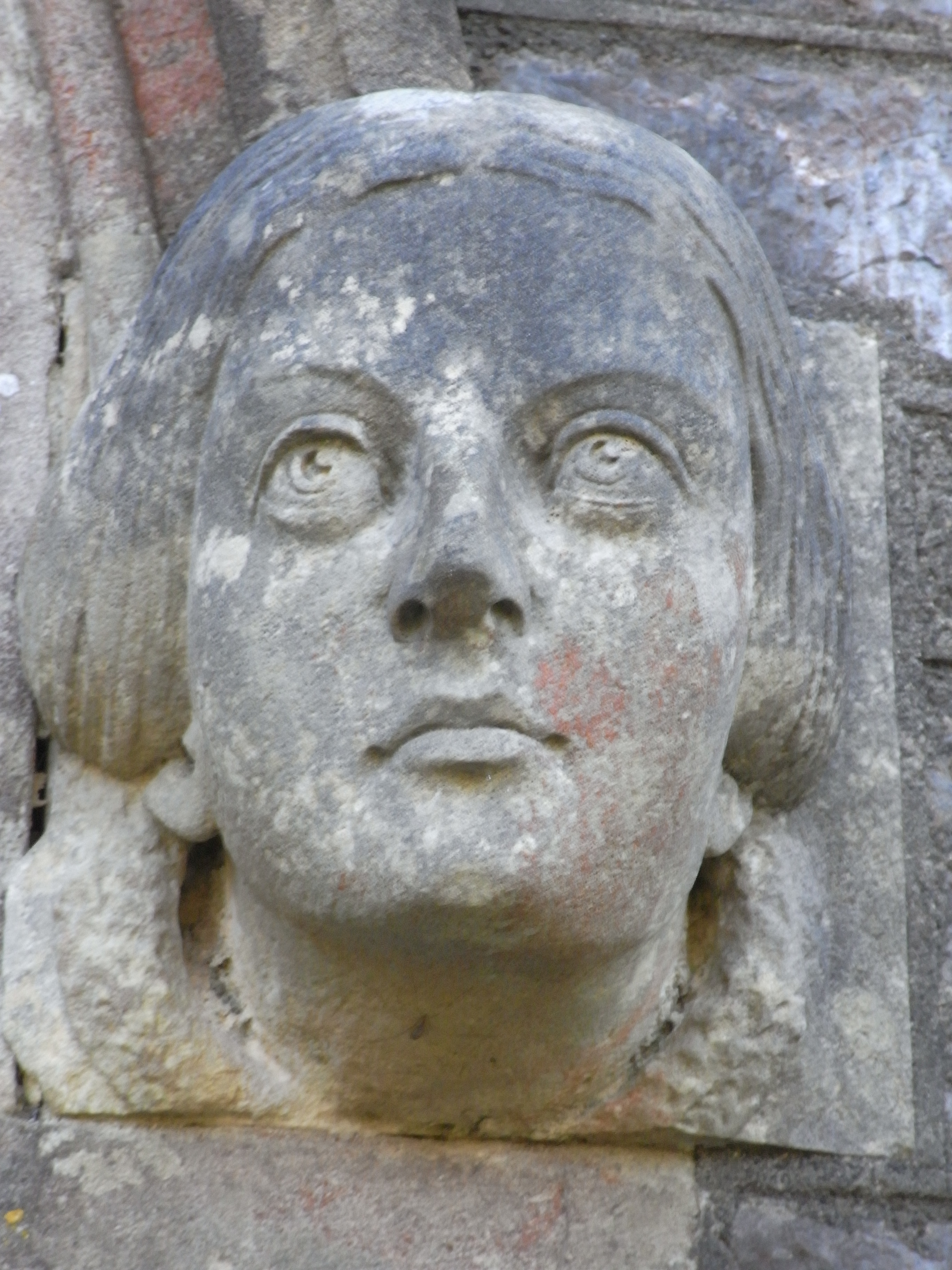
Dripstone sculpted heads depicting Lord Rolle (left) and his second wife Louisa Trefusis (right) either side of external porch of (north) private entrance to Rolle pews, in the church at Bicton erected by Louisa in 1850. The sculpted heads in the same positions at the public (south) entrance are those of Queen Victoria and Prince Albert

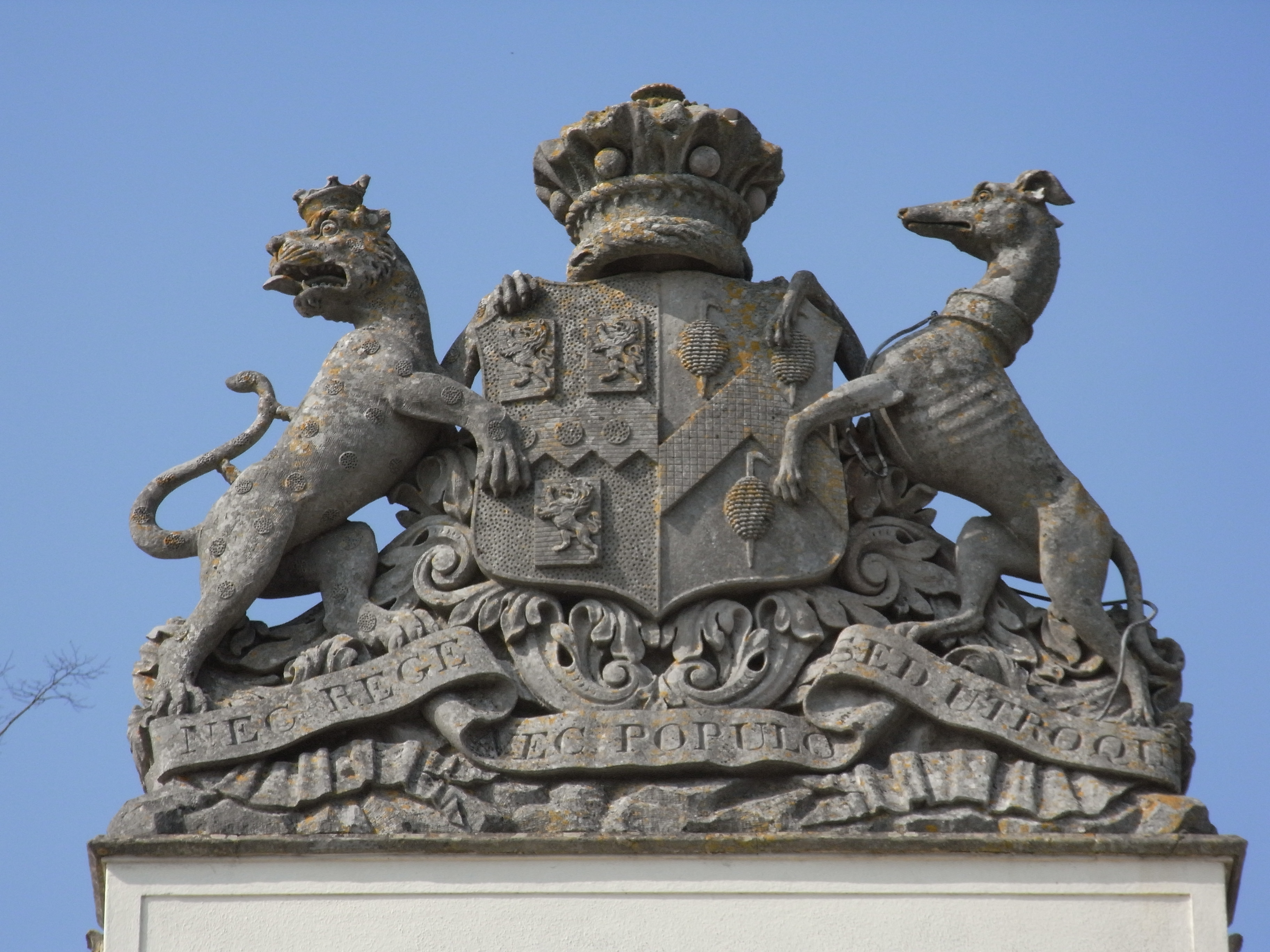
Heraldic achievement of Lord Rolle on top of main gates to Bicton House. The escutcheon shows Rolle impaling Trefusis (Argent, a chevron between three spindles sable), the family of his second wife. The sinister supporter, a greyhound, is that of Trefusis. The motto commences Nec Rege.. ("Not with the King") and therefore dates before 1837, the accession of Queen Victoria

On 24 September 1822 at Huish, Devon, the seat of Lord Clinton, at the age of 72 Rolle married his very distant cousin the 28-year-old Louisa Trefusis (1794–1885), daughter of Robert George William Trefusis, 17th Baron Clinton (1764–1797). Whilst Rolle himself was descended from George Rolle (died 1573), of Marhayes in the parish of Week St Mary in Cornwall, the second son of the founder of the family, George Rolle of Stevenstone (died 1552), MP for Barnstaple, Louisa was descended from the latter's fourth son Henry Rolle, who had married Margaret Yeo, the heiress of Heanton Satchville in Petrockstowe parish, Devon. Henry Rolle's great-grandson Robert Rolle (died 1660), MP, of Heanton Satchville, had married Lady Arabella Clinton, one of the two co-heiresses of their nephew Edward Clinton, 5th Earl of Lincoln and 13th Baron Clinton (died 1692). On the extinction of the senior line of the Rolle-Clinton union on the death of George Walpole, 3rd Earl of Orford and 16th Baron Clinton, their heir became the descendants of their daughter Bridget Rolle (1648–1721) who had married in 1672 Francis Trefusis of the manor of Trefusis in Cornwall. Louisa Trefusis, the second wife of Lord Rolle, was fifth in descent from Francis Trefusis and Bridget Rolle, being the daughter of Robert George William Trefusis, 17th Baron Clinton (1764–1797), of Trefusis, Cornwall. An epigram "much bandied about the county" at the time of the marriage went as follows: (Note: Document advertised for sale by Lesley Aitchison's Manuscripts. Printed form on one side 4to, folded, headed 'Torrington Book Club'. Printed with name of borrower, columns for When received, When Sent, Fines. List 24 names (printed), headed by Lord Rolle, plus seven 'Country Members' including Fortescue, Coffin, Hiern, etc. On the verso is a draft of a letter 'To the Editor' about Lord Rolle's marrying at 72 a young girl, 'but no new bread & the breed must be extinct', citing an epigram 'much bandied about the county': 'How comes it, Rolle, at seventy two/Hale Rolle, Louisa to the altar led?/The thing is neither strange nor new/Louisa took the Rolle for want of bread.' Fowler, Printer, Torrington. 182-. £35.00)

How comes it, Rolle, at seventy two
Hale Rolle, Louisa to the altar led?
The thing is neither strange nor new
Louisa took the Rolle for want of bread.

A marble bust of Louisa exists in the Orangery at Bicton House. Louisa and Rolle shared a love of gardening and created the grand landscaped garden at Bicton, now open to the public as Bicton Park Botanical Gardens. An American traveller, Elihu Burritt, visited Bicton in 1864 and described her hostess in terms of great praise:

"This lady is a remarkable woman, without equal or like in England...she is a female rival of Alexander the Great. The world that the Grecian conqueror subjugated was a small affair in space compared with the two hemispheres which this English lady has taken by the hair of the head and bound to her chair of state. It seems to have been her ambition for nearly half a century to do what was never done before by man or woman in filling her great park and gardens with a collection of trees and shrubs that should be to them what the British Museum is to the relics of antiquity and the literature of all ages".

At the time of her death in December 1885, the New York Times obituary reported:

"Lady Rolle was a very clever woman, wonderful to the last in her capacity for business, and for her strong, shrewd common sense, and always resolute to have her own way in everything."

Louisa built several buildings in Devon including:

- The China Tower at Bicton, built by Lady Rolle in 1839 as a birthday present for her husband, restored in 2013 by its new owners the Landmark Trust.
- Almshouses at Livery Dole, Heavitree, Exeter, re-built in 1849 as a pair on an adjacent site to the previous buildings, inherited from the Denys family of Bicton by the Rolles.
- Bicton Church, built anew in 1850 on a site adjoining the old church. It incorporates a north transept containing several pews reserved for herself and her guests at Bicton, invisible to the general congregation in the nave and entered through a private north porch. The seating in the nave was occupied by estate staff, each pew being inscribed with the job-title of the staff member in strict hierarchical order.
- Rolle Mausoleum, Bicton, built in 1850 within the ruins of Old Bicton Church, containing her monument to her husband Lord Rolle and an existing monument to Denys Rolle (1614–1638).
- St Michael's Church, Otterton, remodelled 1869–71.

== Adoptive heir ==
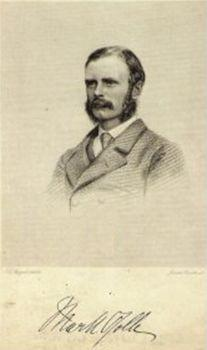
Hon. Mark George Kerr Rolle (1835–1907), drawn aged 35 in 1870, by Joseph Brown, National Portrait Gallery, NPG D10788

Rolle's second marriage also produced no children. It had been thought that his heir presumptive was his next-of-kin, Rev. John Moore-Stevens (1784–1865), Archdeacon of Exeter, younger brother of Thomas Moore-Stevens (1782–1832), JP, of Cross, Little Torrington, appointed by Lord Rolle in 1822 as vicar of Otterton, a manor adjoining Bicton purchased by Rolle's father Denys Rolle (died 1797). (Note: Per marble tablet listing incumbents and patrons in Otterton Church.) Rev. Moore-Stevens's grandmother was Christiana Maria Rolle (1710–1780), Lord Rolle's aunt, who had married Henry Stevens (1689–1748) of Cross. He married Anne Eleanor Roberts, daughter of Rev. William Roberts, fellow and vice-provost of Eton College. An inscribed white marble tablet exists to the memory of his wife and himself in Exeter Cathedral. (Note: East end of South Ambulatory, south wall.) His son was John Moore-Stevens (born 1818), JP, DL, MP for North Devon, High Sheriff of Devon 1870, who rebuilt Winscott House, Peters Marland, in 1865. Lord Rolle however had decided to appoint as his heir Louisa's younger nephew, the six-year-old Hon. Mark George Kerr Trefusis (1835–1907), the younger brother of Charles Trefusis (1834–1904) 20th Baron Clinton. Whether his marriage to Louisa had been by chance or dynastic design, in fact the Trefusis Barons Clinton would have had an excellent claim to be his closest kin and legal heirs. Thus Rolle had followed his family's ancient practice of keeping the estates "in the family". His will required his young heir to change his name to Rolle, which he duly performed, and to adopt the Rolle arms in lieu of those of Trefusis. However, his design to revive the Rolle family was ultimately unsuccessful as Mark Rolle produced only two daughters and no son, and the Rolle inheritance passed to his male heir, his nephew, Charles John Robert Trefusis (1863–1957), 21st Baron Clinton. The Trefusis family had several generations before inherited the estates of the Rolle family of Heanton Satchville, Petrockstowe, the most junior line of the family descended from the patriarch George Rolle (died 1552), and thus added to those large landholdings the huge Stevenstone and Bicton estates. However, liquid funds were not available to meet the large death duties, and much of the Stevenstone estate was sold to meet the tax liability.

== Death and burial ==
Rolle died in 1842 at Bicton House in Devon. As part of her re-building of Bicton Church as St Mary's Church, completed in 1850, his widow Louisa retained as a Rolle mausoleum part of the ruins of the ancient Church of the Holy Trinity on the site and erected therein an elaborate monument to the memory of her husband, designed by Pugin and sculpted in the London workshop of George Myers. It consists of a Gothic-style chest tomb in front of a high arch filled-in with Gothic-style tracery and sculpted figures. In the same mausoleum is the baroque monument to his distant cousin Denys Rolle (1614–1638), who had inherited Bicton from his mother Anne Denys. He was third in descent from John Rolle (died 1570), the eldest son and heir of the patriarch George Rolle (died 1552) of Stevenstone, MP for Barnstaple. The Rolle Mausoleum is the private property of Lord Clinton and is not open to the public as from 2012.

== Monument in St Giles Church ==
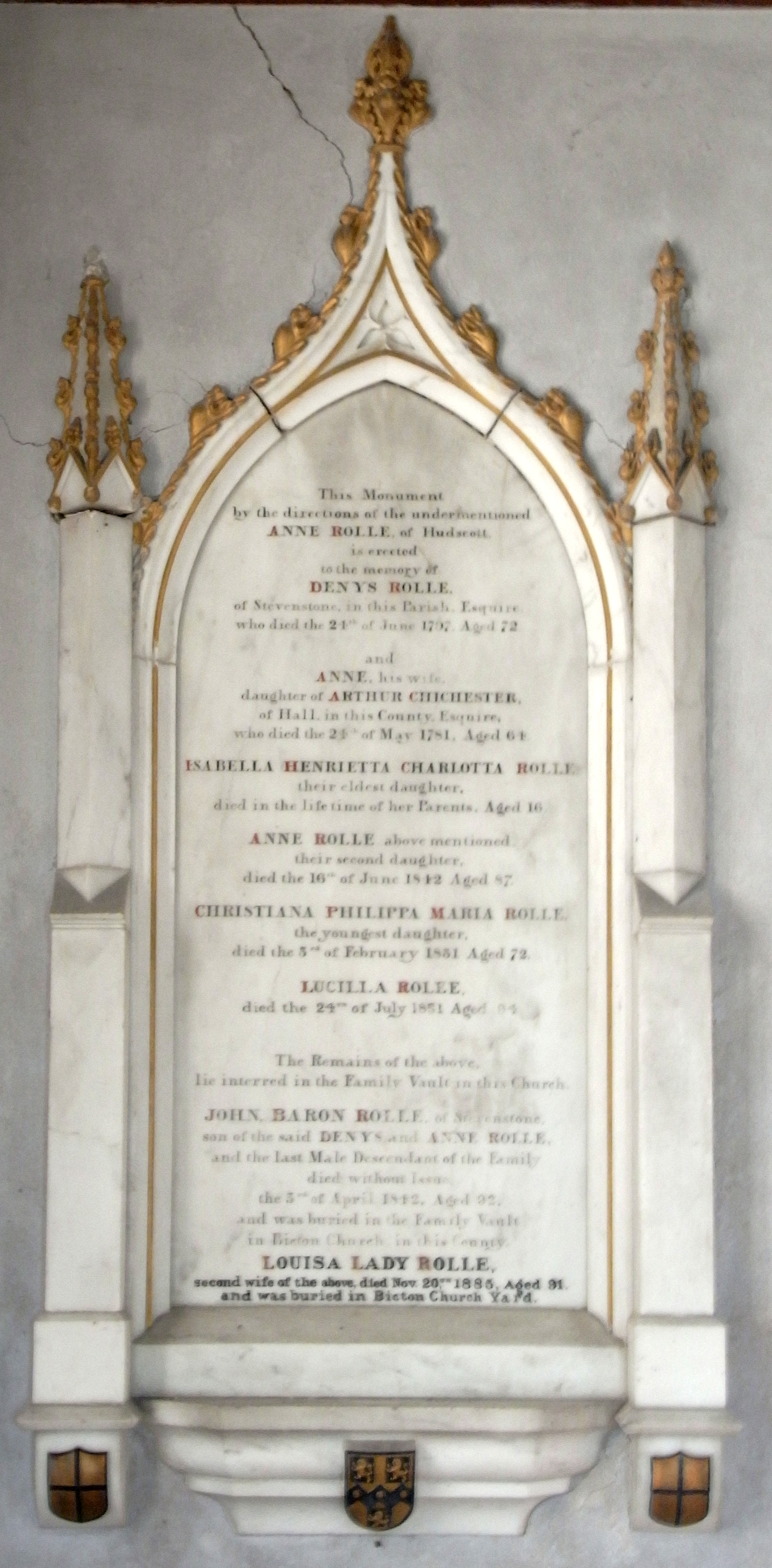
Mural monument in St Giles Church, St Giles in the Wood, erected by Anne Rolle (died 1842) of Hudscott, sister of Lord Rolle, whom he allowed to live with his other spinster sister Lucilla, declared a lunatic in 1846, at his property Hudscott House

The text of the Mural monument in St Giles Church, St Giles in the Wood is as follows:

"This monument by the directions of the undermentioned ANNE ROLLE of Hudscott is erected in the memory of DENYS ROLLE of Stevenstone in this parish, Esquire who died the 24th of June 1797 Aged 72 and ANNE, his wife daughter of ARTHUR CHICHESTER of Hall in this County, Esquire who died the 24th May 1781 Aged 64. ISABELLA HENRIETTA CHARLOTTA ROLLE their eldest daughter died in the lifetime of her parents aged 16. ANNE ROLLE above mentioned, their second daughter, died the 16th of June 1842 Aged 87. CHRISTIANA PHILIPPA MARIA ROLLE the youngest daughter, died the 3rd of February 1831 aged 72. Lucilla ROLLE died the 24th of July 1851 aged 94. The Remains of the above lie interred in the Family Vault in this Church. JOHN, BARON ROLLE, of Stevenstone son of the said DENYS and ANNE ROLLE, and the last male descendant of the family died without issue the 3rd of April 1842, Aged 92, and was buried in the Family Vault in Bicton Church in the County. LOUISA LADY ROLLE, second wife of the above, died Nov 20th 1885, Aged 91, and was buried in Bicton Church Yard"

== Sources ==
- Complete Peerage, Volume XI, pages 75–6
- Lewis Namier and John Brooke. "The History of Parliament 1754–1790, 3 vols" (1964). London: Secker & Warburg, p.. ISBN 0-436-30420-1.
- P. A. Symonds and David R. Fisher. "ROLLE, John (1756-1842), of Stevenstone, Bicton and Tidwell, Devon (1986). In History of Parliament: House of Commons 1790–1820 by R. Thorne (ed.).
- "Summary of Will of The Right Honorable John Baron Rolle of Stevenstone, Devon Proved 1 August 1842" (1967). Accessed from Brian Randell (November 1967). Archived 1 February 2012. Transcribed by Elizabeth Howard.
- "JOHN ROLLE" (August 1842). Gentleman's Magazine Vol. XVIII, p. 201-202.
- Leigh Rayment's Peerage Pages

Parliament of Great Britain
| Preceded by John Rolle Walter; John Parker | Member of Parliament for Devon; 1780–1796 (with John Parker 1780–1784; John Pollexfen Bastard 1784–1816) | Succeeded by John Pollexfen Bastard; Sir Lawrence Palk, Bt |
