= Christine Walkden =

British television presenter and gardener

- Born: 1955 (age 70–71); Rishton, Lancashire, England
- Occupations: Gardener, television presenter, author
- Employer: BBC
- Known for: The One Show, Christine's Garden

Christine Helen Walkden is a British television presenter and gardener, best known for her appearances on gardening programmes and The One Show. She has hosted her own series centred on her home garden in Sawbridgeworth, Christine's Garden, on the BBC.

== Career ==
Walkden trained at the Lancashire College of Agriculture (now known as Myerscough College) and then worked at two experimental horticultural stations, before moving to the Royal Botanic Gardens, Kew based at Wakehurst Place, where she looked after the growing side of the seed physiology unit. After several more jobs she undertook a career change and became a freelance horticulturist, lecturing nationally and internationally.

She has presented on BBC’s Gardeners' World and various other TV and radio programmes and is a regular member of the panel of BBC Radio 4 Gardeners' Question Time . She is a winner of the Garden Writers’ Guild Radio Broadcasting Award.

In 1993, Walkden's book, The Houseplant Almanac, was published, and in 2007 A Year in Christine's Garden – The Secret Diary of a Garden Lover was published to accompany the television series. In 2011, her third book, No-Nonsense Vegetable Gardening, was published. Walkden previously wrote a weekly column in Amateur Gardening magazine and is a regular contributor to Choice magazine.

Walkden also appeared as a guest on the December 2008 special of Shooting Stars.

Walkden is a regular contributor to Jersey Choice Plants and Quality Garden Tools.

In 2013, she presented an episode of Great British Garden Revival.

In 2014, Walkden presented the BBC series Glorious Gardens from Above where she viewed various large gardens in the UK from a hot air balloon and visited them on the ground.
