= The City Gardener =

Gardening television series

The City Gardener is a gardening television series, produced by Twofour and broadcast on Channel 4 from 2003 to 2005 in the UK and on HGTV in the US.

The show is hosted by Matt James, who is billed as "a genuine, 21st-century tree-hugger". The show is targeted at urban city dwellers that might otherwise overlook their potential gardens due to a busy schedule, small garden area or not enough do-it-yourself knowledge.

In each episode Matt James visits a home located in the city, which usually contains a dilapidated and/or tiny garden area that needs major renovation. The home owners decide on a budget for their new garden and are consulted on their preference of garden style, features, plants, and maintenance requirement. The space is surveyed and Matt develops a design for the garden in keeping with the homeowner's usually modest budget.

In order to get the most out of their money, the home owners usually invite friends and family to help with manual labour. This can include breaking concrete, removing bricks and stone, tearing up grass and topsoil, or even completely removing existing soil in favor of soil that will be more suitable for sustaining plant life.

Matt James pays particular attention to the types of plants that are used in each garden, utilizing his seemingly encyclopedic knowledge of each plant species and providing useful gardening tips geared towards gardening in the city. The viewer gets the impression that he has a profound love for gardening and for plants in particular.

As the show draws to an end the garden is completed. Before and after pictures are shown with an overview of the major features of the new garden. The homeowners are consulted and are usually very pleased.

Matt James also filmed an American version of The City Gardener called Urban Outsiders for HGTV, featuring gardens in New York City and Los Angeles. The first 13 shows aired in 2006, the remaining 13 shows are due to air shortly.
