= Bicton House =

Grade II* listed building near Exmouth, Devon

Coordinates: 50.6701°N 3.3169°W

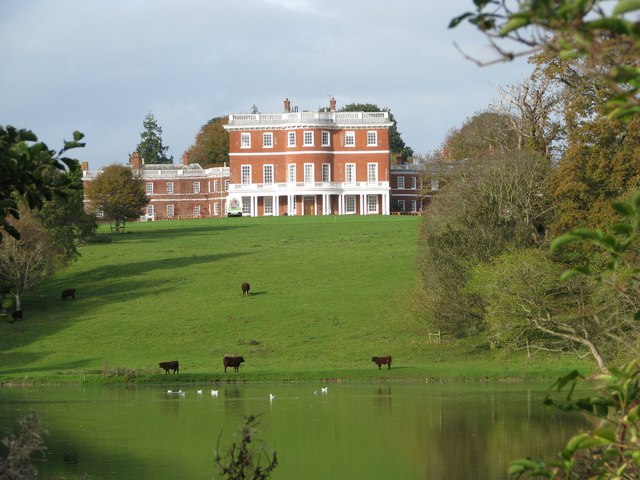
Bicton House, viewed from across the lake

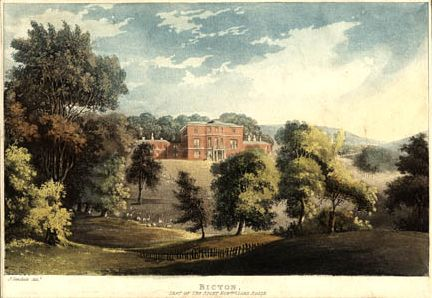
John Gendall, Bicton, seat of the Right Honorable Lord Rolle, c. 1820, engraving.

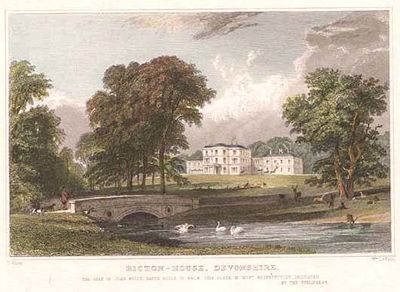
W. le Petit, Bicton House, Devonshire, c. 1830, engraving of a drawing by T. Allom.

Bicton House, or Bickton House, is a late 18th- or early 19th-century country house, which stands on the campus of Bicton College, Bicton, near Exmouth, East Devon. It is a Grade II* listed building. The park and gardens are Grade I listed in the National Register of Historic Parks and Gardens.

It is located about three miles from Sidmouth, in Devonshire. It had been in the East Budleigh Hundred.

== Manor ==
=== 12th and 13th centuries ===
This manor was held in demesne by William Portitor, the king's door-keeper, at the time of the taking the Domesday Survey. It was held as the king's jail for the county of Devon. The manor of Bicton was granted by King Henry I to John Janitor. In 1229, Ralph Balistarius, or Le Balister (the cross-bow-bearer), occupied the manor. His descendants, the Alabasters, a corruption of Le Balister, held the manor for five generations. It then was passed to the Sacheville, or Sackville, and Copleston families through female heirs.

=== 16th to 18th centuries ===
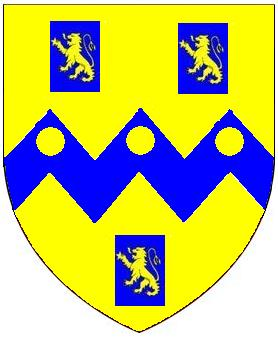
Arms of Rolle: Or, on a fesse dancetté between three billets azure each charged with a lion rampant of the first three bezants

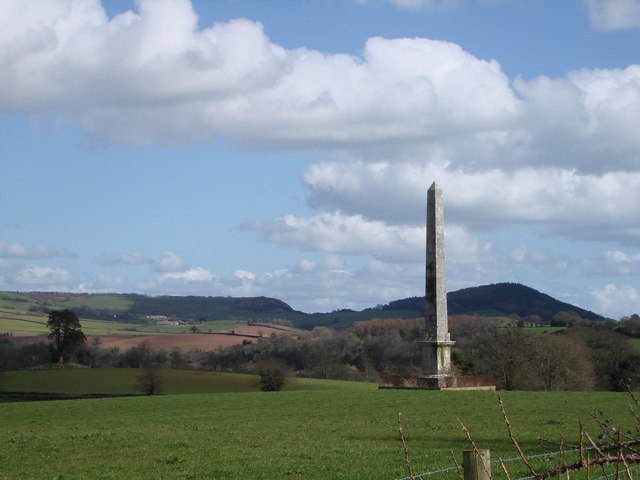
Obelisk erected 1747 in grounds of Bicton House

The lord of Bicton held responsibility for managing the jail, but it was removed from Bicton House to Exeter. It was purchased in the 16th century of the Coplestones by Sir Robert Denys (1525–1592) of nearby Holcombe Burnel, who built a new manor house and created one of the county's first enclosed deer parks. Sir Robert Denys's son, Sir Thomas Denys died and his daughter Anne Denys received the manor. She had married Sir Henry Rolle (d.1616) of Stevenstone, Devon and the estate was conveyed to her husband. Henry was the son of John Rolle, and great grandson to the founder of the Rolle family of Stevenstone, George Rolle (died 1552). (Note: The ancestors of Lord Rolle settled in Devon in the reign of Henry VIII (1509-1547), having purchased considerable portions of abbey lands, among which was the manor of Stevenstone, now one of the principal seats of the family. The lands were purchased by George Rolle, Esquire. His grandson, Sir Henry Rolle, married the heiress of Watts of Somersetshire, whose son married the heiress of Dennis (Denys) of Bicton and Holcombe-Burnell in Devon.) Henry and the former Miss Deny's son, Dennis Rolle, Esquire died in 1638, leaving a son who died in his infancy and a daughter named Florence.

Henry's nephew, also named Henry, of Beam near Torrington, inherited the estate, but died without a living heir in 1647. The manor was then passed to John Rolle (Note: John, like Henry, descended from George Rolle (d. 1552).) through marriage to his cousin Florence Rolle, co-heiress of Dennis Rolle, Esquire of Bicton, who at the time of his death in 1706 held nearly 40 manors in Devonshire and estates in Cornwall, Somersetshire, and Northamptonshire. John had married the heiress of Marrais and settled there. He was made Knight of the Bath (K.B.) and was a representative for the county. John and Florence had four sons, the eldest son was the grandfather of Henry was made Baron Role in 1748 and died in 1750 without issue and the title became extinct. In 1787 the lord of the manor was exonerated from the superintendence of the county jail. The title Baron Rolle was revived in 1796, when Henry Rolle's nephew, John Rolle, Esquire was created a peer by the same style and title. (Note: John's father was Denys Rolle, Henry's brother.)

=== 19th and 20th centuries ===
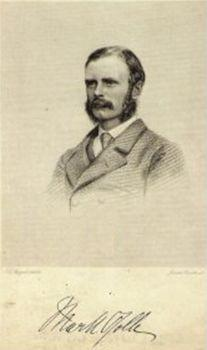
Joseph Brown, Hon. Mark George Kerr (Trefusis) Rolle (1836-1907), 1870, National Portrait Gallery, NPG D10788

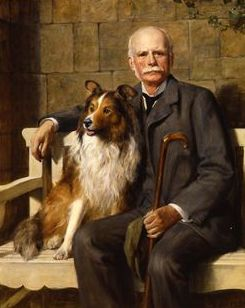
Sir John Collier, Hon. Mark Rolle (1836-1907), Collection of Lord Clinton

In about 1800 John Rolle, 1st Baron Rolle (d.1842), son of Dennis Rolle (d.1797), replaced the old manor house with the existing three-storey mansion, designed by architect James Wyatt and built in red brick and limestone. Wyatt also designed the Lodge, built at the same time.

The site was described about 1820 to have a "commanding full view of the British Channel" and ancient beech and oak trees within the estate's park. The mansion, with two extensive wings, held an extensive collection of art, including works by Rembrandt and Ruysdael. It looked over the village of Otterton, with its little church, and the "lovely peep" between the Saltern and the ocean. A Gothic lodge is located at the main entrance, followed by a rustic inner lodge. Another entrance is by a "neat cottage-lodge." An obelisk is seen from most parts of the ground.

John Rolle, 1st Baron Rolle married the Hon. Louisa Trefusis, a relative and second daughter of Robert Trefusis, 17th Baron Clinton. He died without issue in 1842. The Stevenstone and Bicton estates, amounting to some 55,000 acres (220 km^{2}), devolved by his will to Hon. Mark George Kerr Trefusis (1836–1907), then aged 6, the nephew of his second wife Louisa Trefusis (1794–1885) (daughter of Robert George William Trefusis, 17th Baron Clinton (1764–1797)), and second son of the 19th Baron Clinton. On his inheritance in 1852 he changed his surname to Rolle; he died without issue in 1907, his heir being his nephew Charles John Robert Hepburn-Stuart-Forbes-Trefusis, 21st Baron Clinton (1863–1957). (Note: The Trefusis family is descended from Samuel Trefusis, of Trefusis in Cornwall, the second son and eventual heir of Francis Trefusis by his wife Bridget Rolle (1648–1721). Bridget Rolle was the daughter of Robert Rolle (d.1660), MP, (by Lady Arabella Clinton, younger daughter of Theophilus Clinton, 4th Earl of Lincoln & 12th Baron Clinton (d.1667)) of Heanton Satchville, Petrockstowe, Devon, the great-grandson of Henry Rolle, the 4th son of the patriarch George Rolle (d.1552), of Stevenstone. Following the extinction of the progeny of Samuel Rolle (1646–1719), the son of Robert Rolle, the estate of Heanton Satchville descended via Bridget Rolle to the Trefusis family, which inherited in 1791 the title of Baron Clinton through their ancestress Lady Arabella Clinton.)

== Agricultural college ==
In 1947 the 21st Baron Clinton leased the house and part of the grounds to Devon County Council for the creation of Bicton Farm Institute, which later became Bicton College. In 1957 the property was sold to the council. The present Baron Clinton continues to own part of the grounds and Bicton Arena, used for equestrian events, and the headquarters of the Clinton Devon Estates Company, which owns 25,000 acres (100 km^{2}) of agricultural land in Devon (1/67th of the county), is nearby.

During the Second World War it housed St Ronan's School, which is now based near Hawkhurst in Kent.
