= Bicton College =

Agricultural school part of Cornwall College

Coordinates: 50.6701°N 3.3169°W

- Budleigh Salterton, Devon; England

Information
- Established: 1947

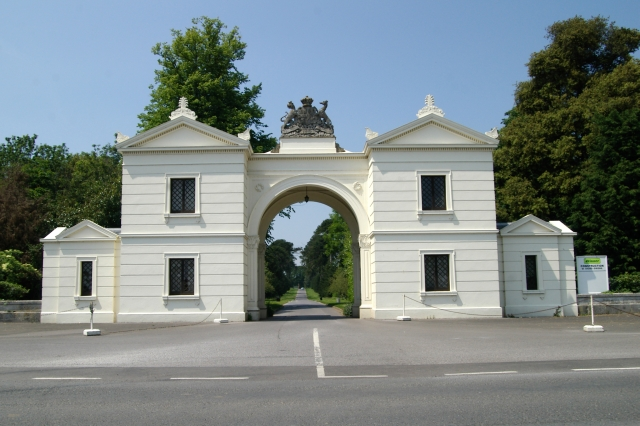
Entrance Gate to Bicton College.

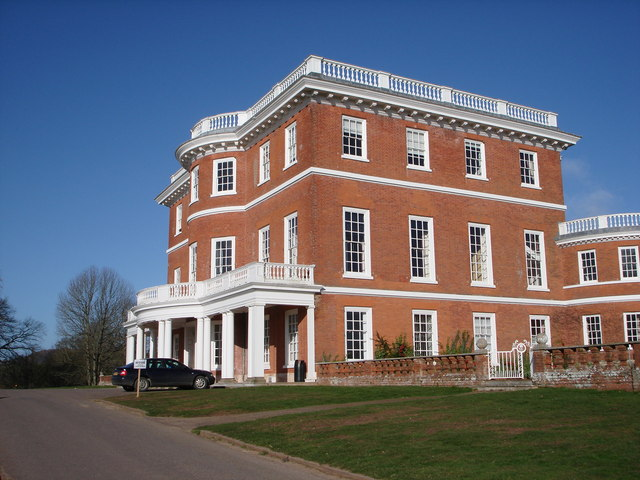
Bicton College, main building.

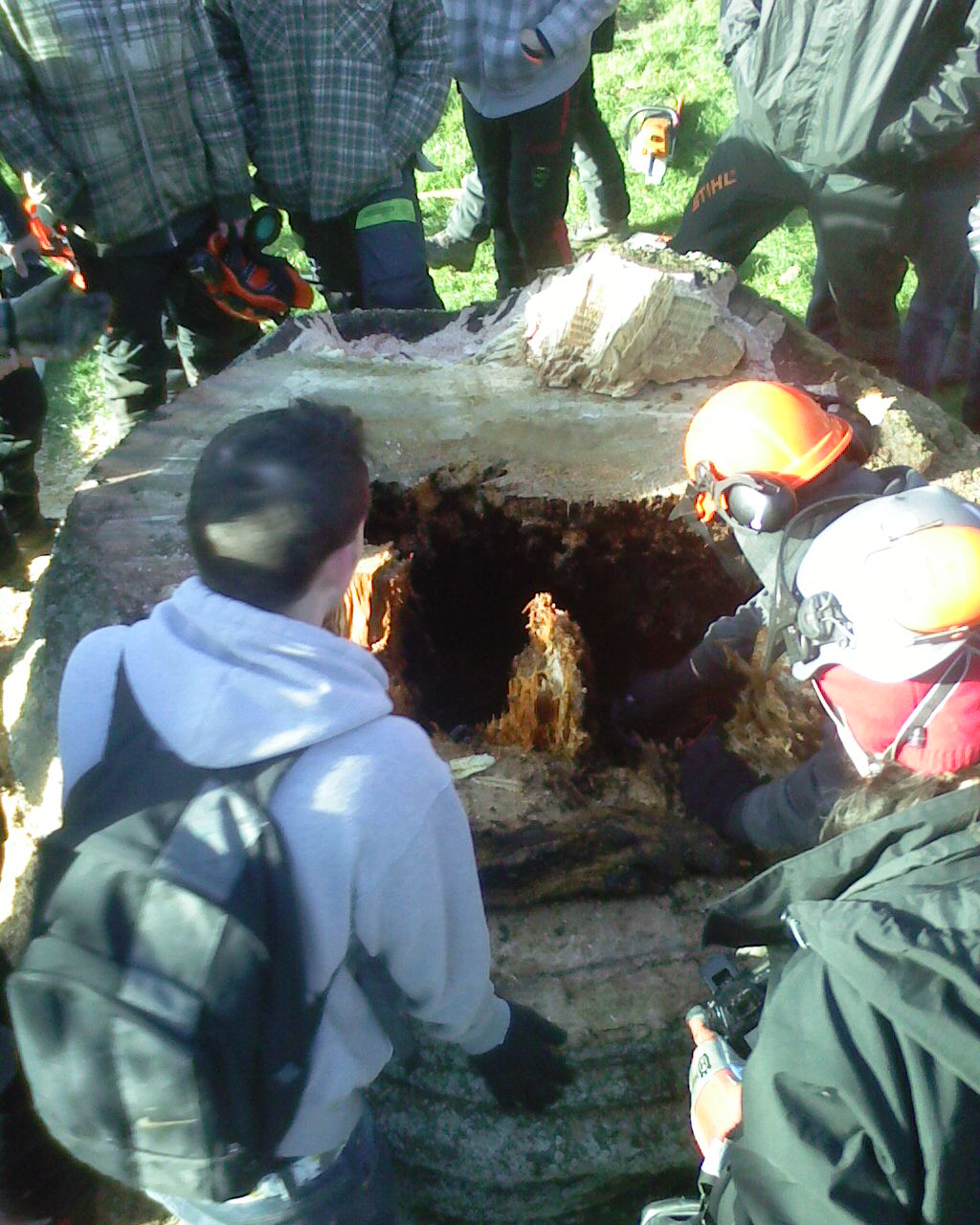
Arboriculture students gather around the stump of an Araucaria araucana felled on college grounds.

Bicton College is a college with around 1,000 full-time and 3,500 part-time pupils, located near Budleigh Salterton, Devon, England. It is part of the Cornwall College group. The college specialises in agriculture and currently offers courses in such topics as animal care, countryside management, horticulture, veterinary nursing, and agricultural engineering, aboriculture and floristry. The college's courses range from level 1 all the way to foundation degrees. For the level-4 courses the college works in partnership with the University of Plymouth.

The college was founded under the name Bicton Farm Institute in 1947, when the Devon County Council leased Bicton House and part of the Bicton Park estate from Lord Clinton. The name was changed in 1967 to Bicton College of Agriculture and in 2002 to Bicton College.

For the years 2007–2008 Bicton College was recognised as a Centre of Excellence in Teacher Training for its training of teachers in the Post Compulsory (Post 16) sector.

== See also ==
- List of UCAS institutions
- List of universities in the United Kingdom
