= John Rolle (Devon MP, born 1679) =

British landowner and Tory politician

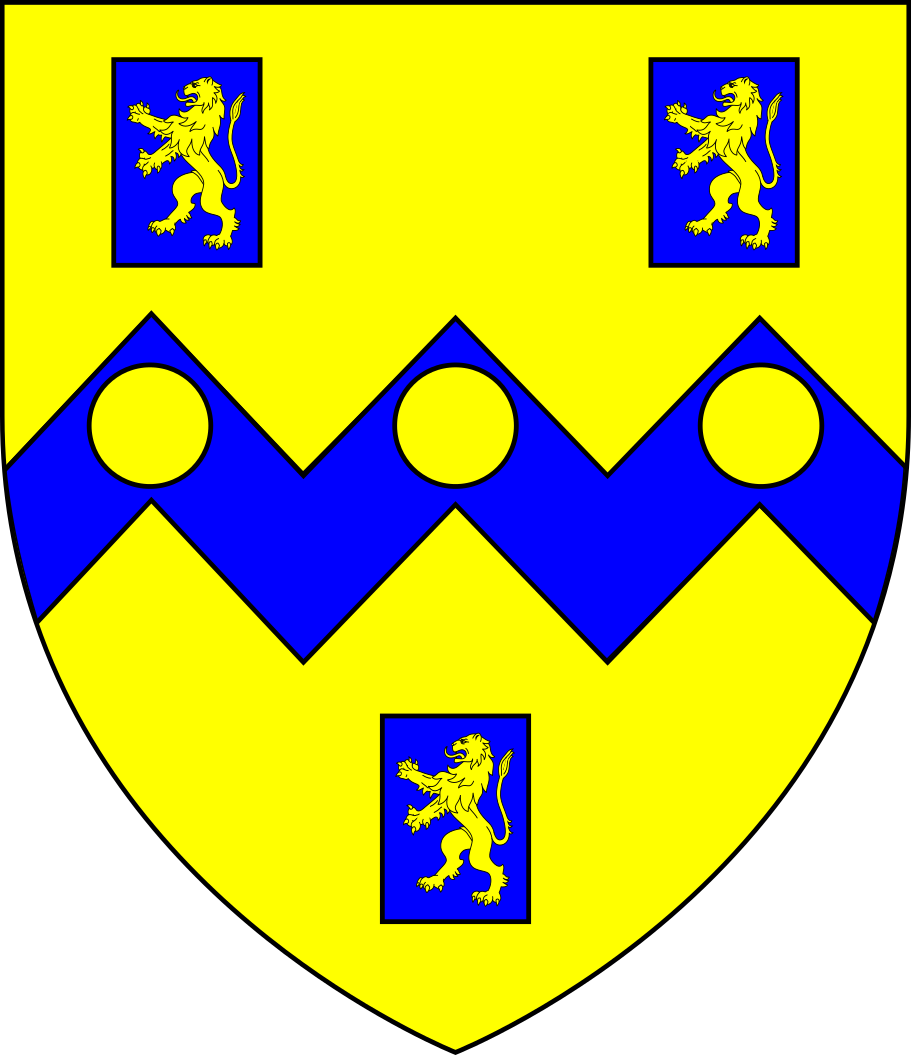
- Arms of Rolle: Or, on a fesse dancetté between three billets azure each charged with a lion rampant of the first three bezants

Member of Parliament
- In office 1710–1730
- Constituency: Devon (1710–1713); Exeter (1713–1715); Barnstaple (1715–1722); Exeter (1722–1727); Devon (1727–1730)
- In office 1703–1705
- Constituency: Saltash

Personal details
- Born: 1679 England
- Died: 6 May 1730 (aged 50–51)
- Party: Tory
- Spouse: Isabella Walter (m. 1706)
- Children: 11, including Henry, John and Denys
- Relatives: Robert Rolle (brother); John Rolle (grandfather); Robert Bruce (grandfather)
- Education: Queens' College, Cambridge

John Rolle (1679 – 6 May 1730) of Stevenstone and Bicton in Devon, was a British landowner and Tory politician who sat in the English House of Commons from 1703 to 1705 and in the British House of Commons from 1710 to 1730. He declined the offer of an earldom by Queen Anne, but 18 years after his death his eldest son was raised to the peerage in 1748 by King George II as Baron Rolle.

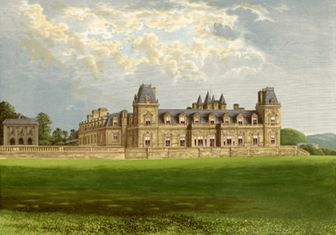
Stevenstone House – main seat of the Rolle family

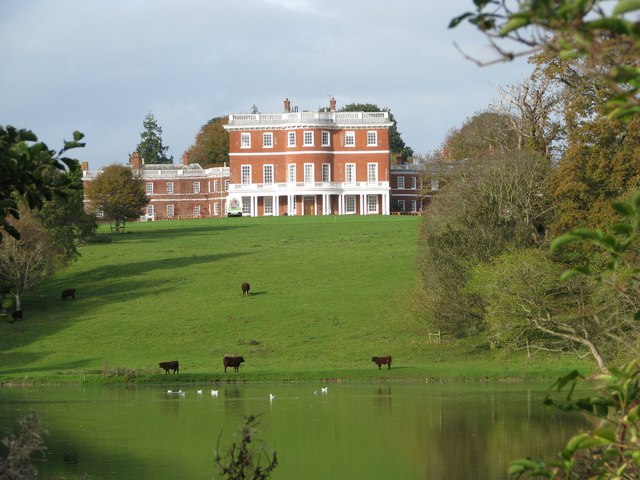
Bicton House

== Origins ==
Rolle was the second son of John Rolle (died 1689) by his wife Lady Christiana Bruce, daughter of Robert Bruce, 1st Earl of Ailesbury and 2nd Earl of Elgin (c. 1626–1685). His elder brother was Robert Rolle (died 1710), MP.

== Education ==
Rolle attended Queens' College, Cambridge in 1696 and entered the Inner Temple in 1697 for his training as a lawyer. He was called to the bar in 1705.

== Inheritance ==
As Rolle's father had predeceased his own father Sir John Rolle (1626–1706), KB, of Stevenstone (Sheriff of Devon in 1682 and MP for Barnstaple (1660) and for Devon (1661–1679), Sir John's heir was his eldest grandson Robert Rolle, MP, of Stevenstone. When Robert died childless in 1710, John Rolle succeeded his elder brother, inheriting his estates at Stevenstone and Bicton.

== Career ==
As a younger son Rolle was destined for a career as a lawyer. He first entered Parliament as MP for Saltash (1703–1705). At the age of 31 in 1710 he succeeded unexpectedly to the vast estates of his elder brother Robert Rolle, the patrimony of their grandfather, and became a man of great substance and influence. He was next elected MP for Devon in 1710 and arrived ostentatiously in London on 22 November 1710 with two six-horse coaches attended by 12 men in livery and was met by about 100 gentlemen on horseback. He held the seat until 1713, when he was elected MP for Exeter (1713–1715). Next he sat for Barnstaple (1715–1722), then a second time for Exeter (1722–1727) and finally a second time for Devon from 1727 until his death in 1730.

== Marriage and children ==
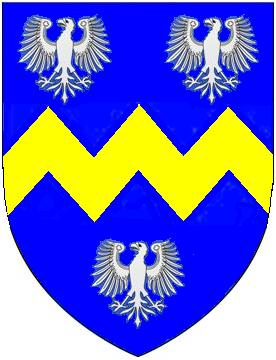
Arms of Walter of Sarsden: Azure, a fesse indented or between three eagles displayed argent

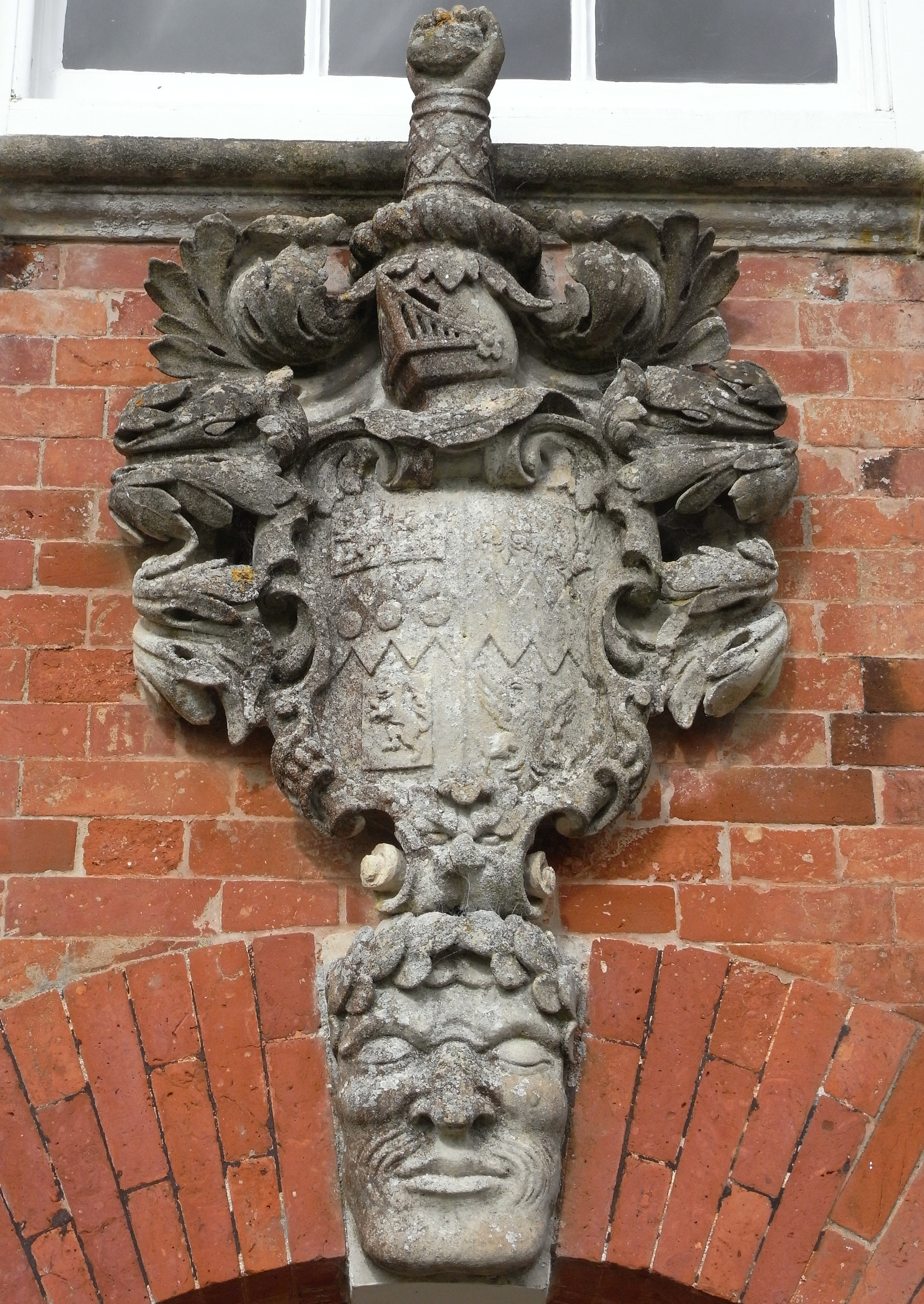
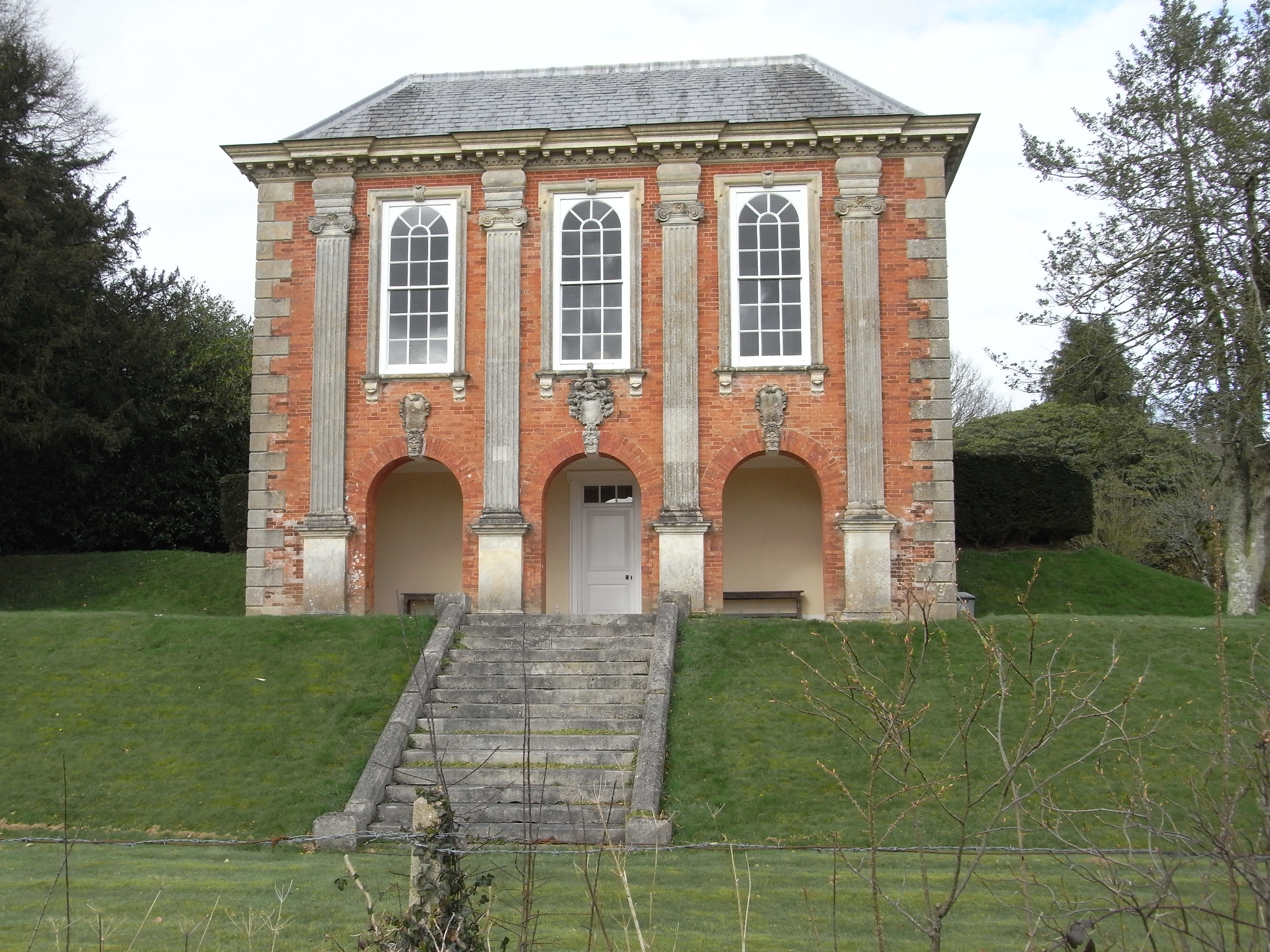
Left: Sculpted stone heraldic achievement c.1715–1730 above central arch keystone on the surviving Palladian library (right) at Stevenstone, built by John Rolle (1679–1730), showing on an escutcheon the arms of Rolle impaling Walter, the family of his wife Isabella Walter. Above is the crest of Rolle: A cubit arm erect vested or charged with a fess indented double cotised azure in the hand a flint-stone proper

In August 1706 Rolle married Isabella Charlotta Walter, daughter of Sir William Walter, 2nd Baronet, of Saresden, Oxfordshire. She brought with her a dowry of £1,500. His children was as follows:

- Henry Rolle, 1st Baron Rolle (1708–1750), eldest son, MP, died childless.
- John Rolle Walter (c.1714–1779), 2nd son, Tory MP for Exeter 1754–1776 and for Devon 1776–1779. He assumed the surname of Walter on succeeding to the estates of his maternal uncle.
- William Rolle (1720-post 1747), 3rd son, of Beam, Great Torrington, whose will was dated 1747.
- Denys Rolle (1725–1797), 4th son and eventual heir, of Hudscott, Stevenstone and Bicton in Devon and East Tytherley in Hampshire, an independent Member of Parliament for Barnstaple, Devon, between 1761 and 1774. He was the largest landowner in Devon, with a rent-roll of £40,000 per annum. His eldest son was John Rolle, 1st Baron Rolle (1751–1842).
- Christiana Maria Rolle, eldest daughter, who married Henry Stevens of Winscott, Peters Marland, Devon.
- Isabella Charlotte Rolle, 2nd daughter, wife of Robert Duke (d.pre-1785), the last male of the Duke family, lords of the manor of Otterton in Devon. The extensive lands of the Dukes, which adjoined the Rolle seat of Bicton in South Devon, were purchased in 1786 by Isabella's brother Denys. John's elder brother Robert Rolle (d.1726) had married Elizabeth Duke (born 1679), a daughter of Richard Duke (born 1653) of Otterton, Robert Duke's grandfather.
- Letitia Rolle, 3rd daughter
- Lucy Rolle (1715–1741)
- Lucilla Rolle (1717–1741)
- Anne Rolle (1721–1721), died an infant
- Maria Philippa (1729–1730), died an infant

== Death and burial ==
Rolle died on 6 May 1730 and was buried at St Giles in the Wood, the parish church of Stevenstone. His obituary praised him as "a gentleman of great candour and honour".

== Sources ==
- Cruickshanks, Eveline, biography of John Rolle (1679–1730) published in History of Parliament: the House of Commons 1690–1715, ed. D. Hayton, E. Cruickshanks, S. Handley, 2002
- Vivian, Lt.Col. J.L., The Visitations of the County of Devon, Exeter, 1895, pp. 652–656, Rolle of Stevenstone

Parliament of England
Preceded by Benjamin Buller; Thomas Carew	Member of Parliament for Saltash; 1703 –1705; With: Thomas Carew	Succeeded by James Buller; Joseph Moyle
Parliament of Great Britain
Preceded by Sir William Courtenay, Bt; Robert Rolle	Member of Parliament for Devon; 1710–1713; With: Sir William Pole; Sir William Courtenay, Bt	Succeeded by Sir William Courtenay, Bt; Sir Coplestone Bampfylde, Bt
Preceded by Sir Coplestone Bampfylde; John Snell	Member of Parliament for Exeter; 1713–1715; With: Francis Drewe	Succeeded by John Bampfylde; Francis Drewe
Preceded by Sir Nicholas Hooper; Sir Arthur Chichester	Member of Parliament for Barnstaple; 1715–1722; With: Sir Arthur Chichester 1715–1718; John Basset 1718–1721; Sir Hugh Acland 1721–1722	Succeeded by Thomas Whetham; Sir Hugh Acland
Preceded by John Bampfylde; Francis Drewe	Member of Parliament for Exeter; 1722–1727; With: Francis Drewe	Succeeded by Samuel Molyneux; Francis Drewe
Preceded by Sir William Courtenay, Bt; Sir Coplestone Bampfylde, Bt	Member of Parliament for Devon; 1727–1730; With: Sir William Courtenay, Bt	Succeeded by Sir William Courtenay, Bt; Henry Rolle
