= William Courtenay, 1st Viscount Courtenay =

British peer

Member of Parliament for Devon
- In office 1741-1762

Member of Parliament for Honiton
- In office 1734-1741

Personal details
- Born: 11 February 1709
- Died: 16 May 1762 (aged 53)
- Spouse: Frances Finch (m. 1741; died 1761)
- Children: 3, including William
- Parent: William Courtenay (father)
- Relatives: Henry Courtenay (brother); Francis Courtenay (grandfather)
- Education: Magdalen College, Oxford

William Courtenay, 1st Viscount Courtenay (11 February 1709 – 16 May 1762), also de jure 7th Earl of Devon, was a British peer. He was the son of William Courtenay, 6th Earl of Devon and 2nd Baronet Courtenay, and Lady Anne Bertie.

== Life ==
Sir William Courtenay was educated at Westminster School and graduated from Magdalen College, Oxford University in 1731 with a Master of Arts. He succeeded to the title of 3rd Baronet Courtenay and de jure to the title of 7th Earl of Devon on 10 October 1735. He was awarded the honorary degree of Doctor of Civil Law by Magdalen College in 1739.

He held the office of Member of Parliament for Honiton as a Tory between 1734 and 1741 and for Devon from 1741 to 6 May 1762, when he was created 1st Viscount Courtenay of Powderham Castle.

== Marriage and children ==
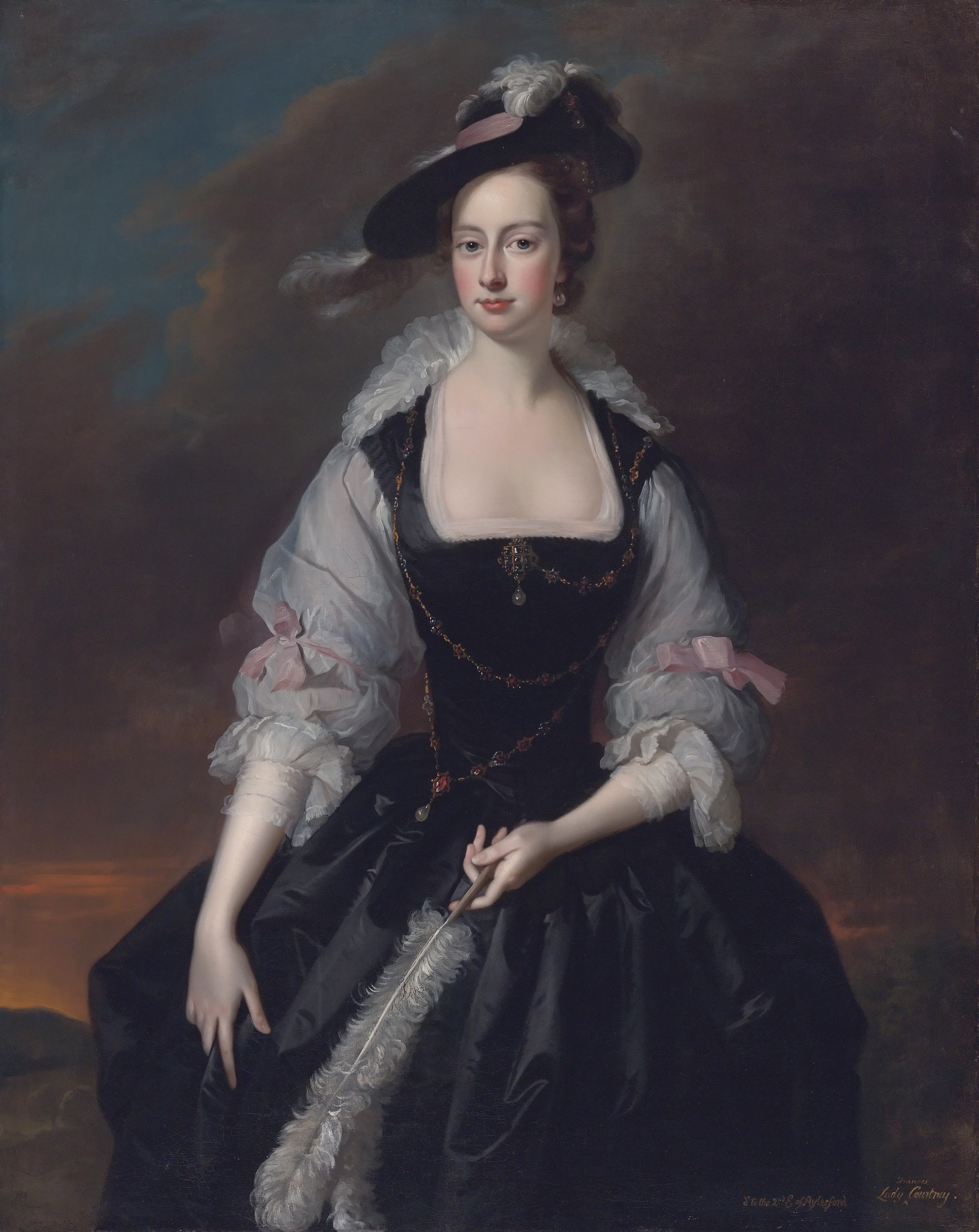
Lady Frances Finch, wife of William Courtenay, 1st Viscount Courtenay. In her hand and hat are shown ostrich feathers, a panache of which form the heraldic crest of Courtenay. Portrait by Thomas Hudson. Sold by Sotheby's New York, 2012

Arms of Finch, Earls of Aylesford: Argent, a chevron between three griffins passant sable

He married on 2 April 1741 Lady Frances Finch (d.1761), daughter of Heneage Finch, 2nd Earl of Aylesford by his wife Mary Fisher (1690-1740), daughter and heiress of Sir Clement Fisher, 3rd Baronet (d.1729) of Packington Hall, Warwickshire. They had the following children:

- William Courtenay, 2nd Viscount Courtenay (30 October 1742 - 14 October 1788)
- the Hon. Charlotte Courtenay (d. 1826), married Alexander Wedderburn, 1st Earl of Rosslyn
- the Hon. Frances Courtenay (d. 1828), married Sir John Wrottesley, 8th Baronet

== Death and burial ==
He was buried on 31 May 1762 at Powderham, Devon, England.

== Residences ==
His seats in Devon were Powderham Castle, which he greatly remodelled, and Forde House, Wolborough, near Newton Abbot. His townhouse in Exeter was the site of the present Devon and Exeter Institution at 7 Cathedral Close, on the north side of the Cathedral Green. It was at one time, like Forde, home of the Parliamentary general, Sir William Waller, whose daughter Margaret Waller was the wife of Courtenay's great-grandfather Sir William Courtenay, 1st Baronet (d.1702). Parts of Waller's building survive at the rear and the gatehouse range fronting the Close. The old hall and kitchen were demolished in 1813 to make way for the Institution and in their place and on the former courtyard are now situated the libraries.

== Overmantel in Exeter townhouse ==
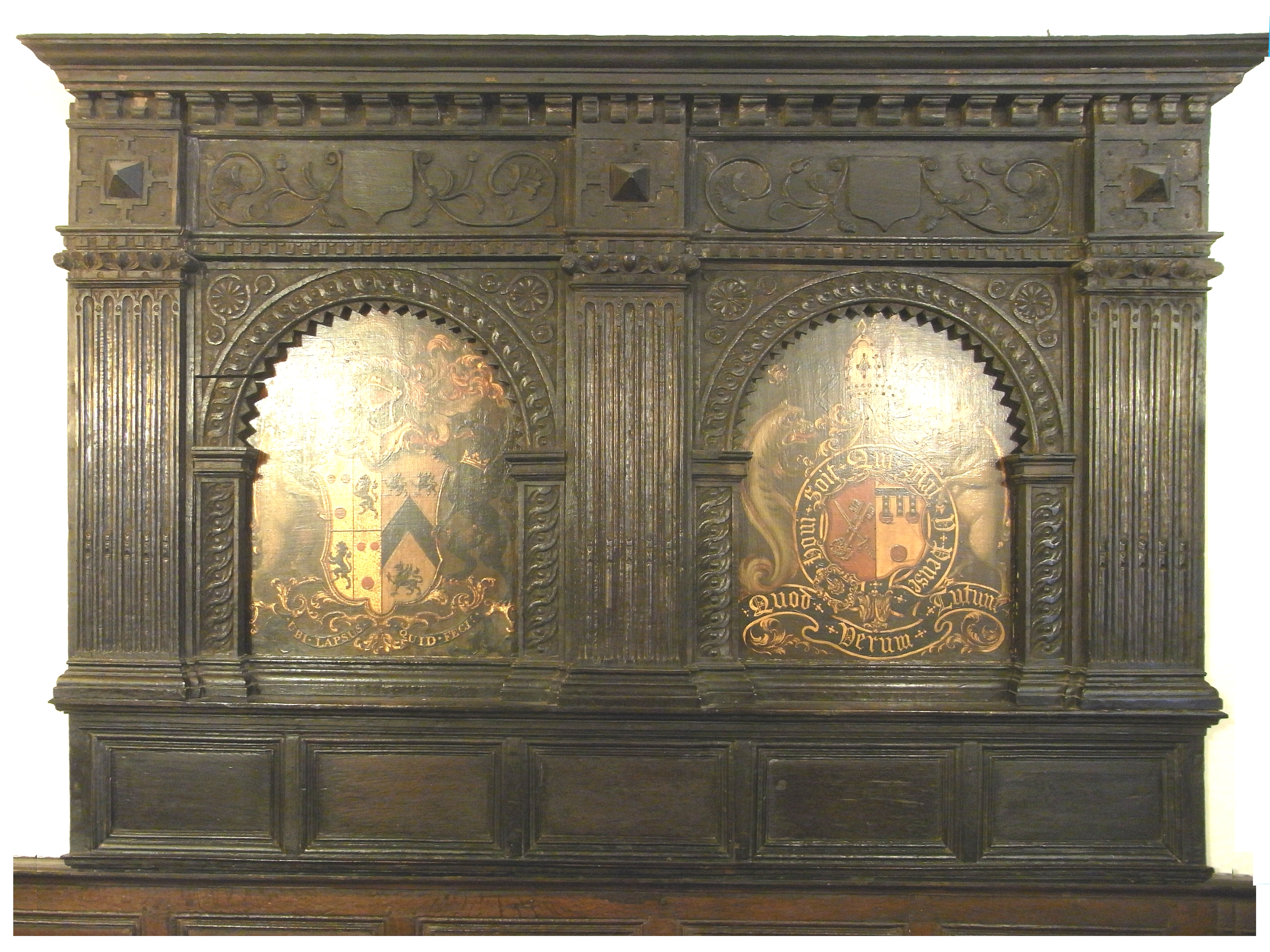
Overmantel in Courtenay's Exeter townhouse showing his arms impaling Finch, his wife's arms

Overmantel circa 1750, in the former townhouse of Courtenays of Powderham, now the home of the Devon and Exeter Institution, 7 Cathedral Close, Exeter. The left-hand painted panel shows the arms of William Courtenay, 1st Viscount Courtenay (1711-1762) impaling the arms of Finch, the family of his wife. The sinister supporter is one of the Finch heraldic griffins, the dexter one is the Courtenay boar. The Courtenay motto is shown underneath: Ubi lapsus quid feci ("Where did I slip what have I done"). The panel on the right shows the arms of Bishop Peter Courtenay (1432–1492), Bishop of Exeter and Winchester, of the Powderham family. His arms (Courtenay with each point of the label charged with three plates for difference) are impaled by the arms of the See of Winchester. The whole is circumscribed by the Garter. The supporters are: dexter, the Courtenay dolphin, sinister, the Courtenay boar. The motto beneath is: Quod verum tutum ("What is true is safe").

Parliament of Great Britain
Preceded by Sir William Yonge; Sir William Pole	Member of Parliament for Honiton; 1734–1741; With: Sir William Yonge	Succeeded by Sir William Yonge; Henry Reginald Courtenay
Preceded by Henry Rolle; John Bampfylde	Member of Parliament for Devon; 1741–1762; With: Theophilus Fortescue 1741–1746; Sir Thomas Dyke Acland 1746–1747; Sir Richard Bampfylde 1747–1762	Succeeded by Sir Richard Bampfylde; John Parker
Peerage of England
Preceded by William Courtenay	Earl of Devon de jure 1735–1762	Succeeded by William Courtenay
Peerage of Great Britain
New creation	Viscount Courtenay of Powderham; 1762	Succeeded by William Courtenay
Baronetage of England
Preceded by William Courtenay	Baronet; 1735–1762	Succeeded by William Courtenay
