= Francis Drewe =

British lawyer and Tory politician

Francis Drewe (c. 1674–1734), of the Grange, Broadhembury, Devon, was a British lawyer and Tory politician who sat in the House of Commons from 1713 to 1734.

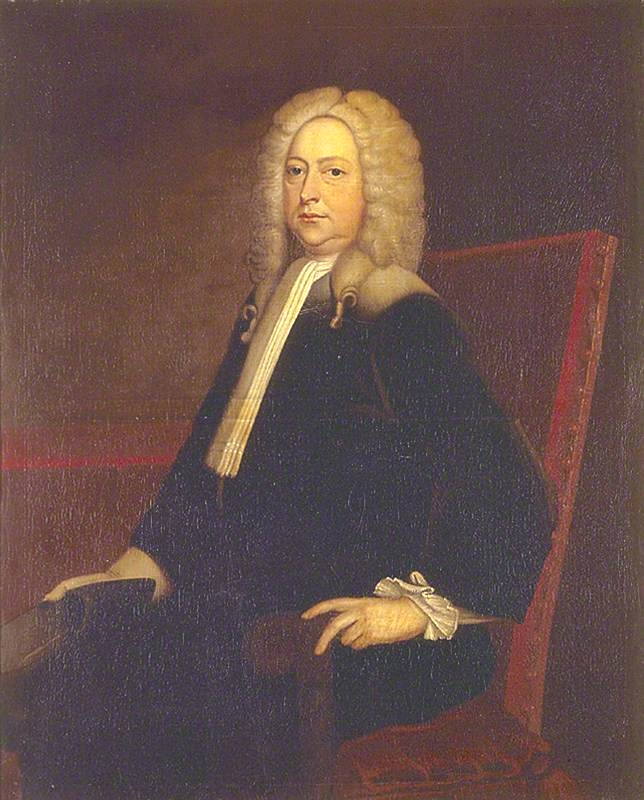
Portrait of Francis Drewe (died 1734) of Grange. National Trust, Dunster Castle Collection

Drewe was born at Lezant, the son of Rev. Edward Drewe, canon of Exeter, and his wife Joan Sparrow daughter of Anthony Sparrow, Bishop of Exeter. He matriculated at Corpus Christi College, Oxford on 2 August 1690, aged 16, and entered Middle Temple in 1691. In 1697 he was called to the bar. He married Mary Bidgood, daughter of Humphrey Bidgood of Rockbeare, near Exeter on 7 January 1695.

Drewe began his career as a barrister at Exeter. His father had political connections and influence and Drewe was returned unopposed as Member of Parliament for Exeter at the 1713 general election. His father died in 1714 and he succeeded to the Grange at Broadhembury.

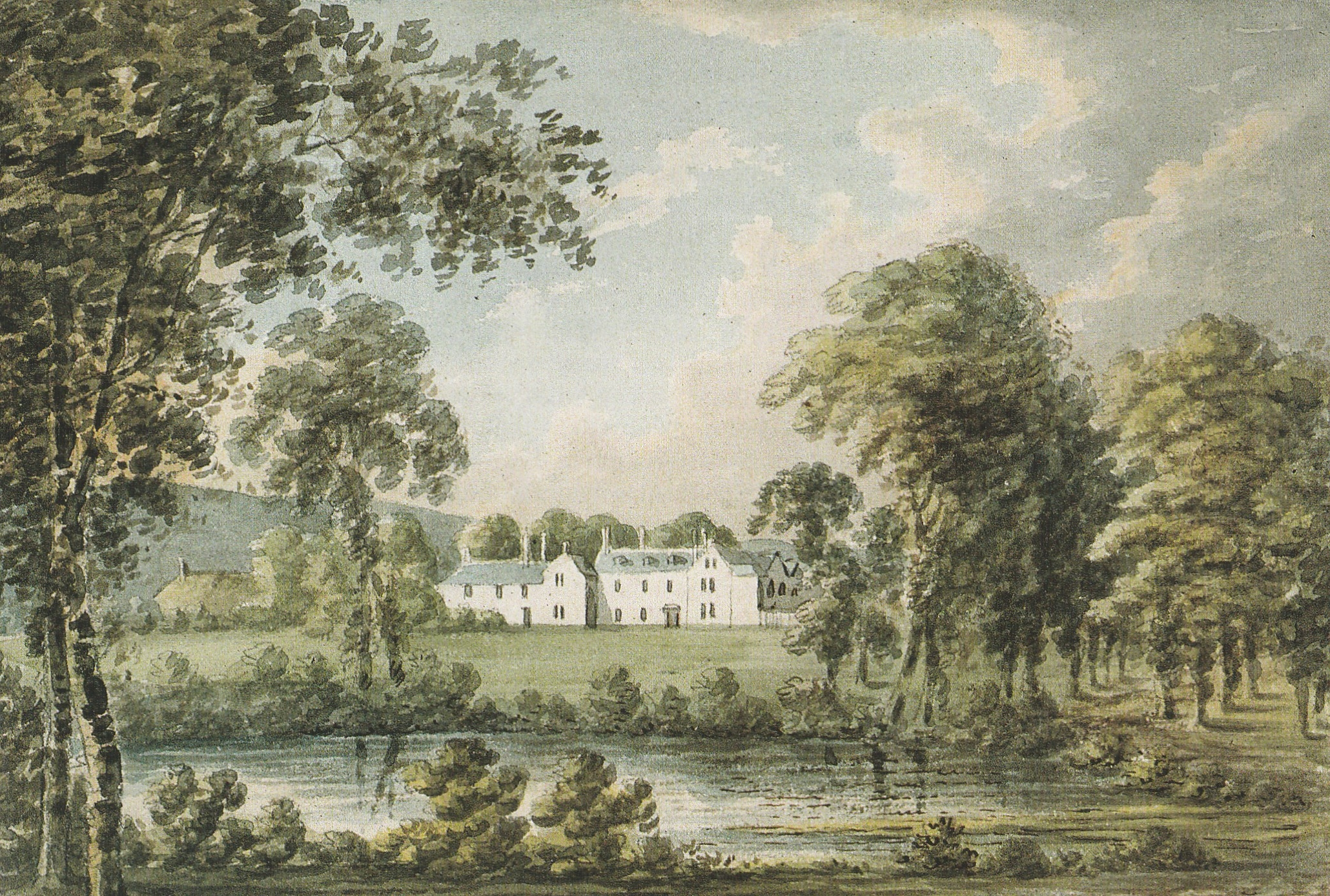
Watercolour of The Grange, Broadhembury, west front, by Rev. John Swete of Oxton House, Kenton, Devon, made during his visit there in June 1800. Devon Record Office 564M/F17/61

Drewe was returned unopposed again at the 1715 general election, but faced a contest at the 1722 general election at which he was returned successfully. He was appointed a bencher in 1723. At the 1727 general election he was returned unopposed again and he retired in 1734. In Parliament, he voted consistently against the Government.

Drewe died aged 60 on 13 September 1734. He and his wife had two sons and three daughters. His son Francis was High Sheriff of Devon in 1738.

== See also ==
- Drewe family of Broadhembury

Parliament of Great Britain
Preceded by Sir Coplestone Bampfylde; John Snell	Member of Parliament for Exeter; 1713–1734; With: John Rolle 1713-1715; John Bampfylde 1715-1722; John Rolle 1722-1727; Samuel Molyneux 1727-1728; John Belfield 1728-1734	Succeeded by John King; Thomas Balle
