= John Bampfylde (1691–1750) =

English landowner and politician

Arms of Bampfylde, Barons Poltimore: Or, on a bend gules three mullets argent

John Bampfylde (8 April 1691 – 17 September 1750) of Hestercombe in Somerset, was an English landowner and politician who sat in the House of Commons between 1715 and 1741.

== Early life and family ==
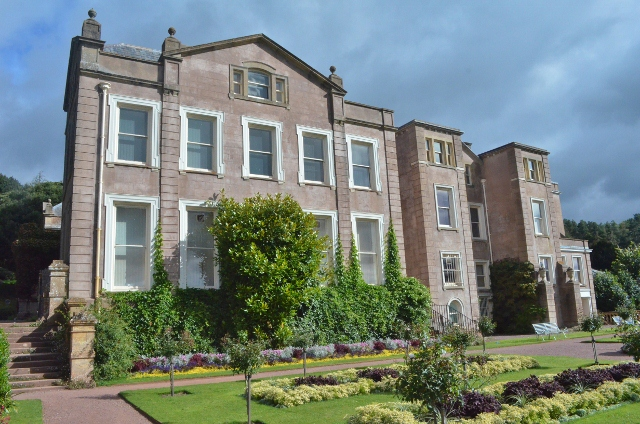
Hestercombe House

Bampfylde was the second son of Colonel Hugh Bampfield (died 1690), (eldest son and heir apparent of Sir Coplestone Bampfylde, 2nd Baronet (c. 1633–1692) of Poltimore and North Molton, Devon, whom he predeceased) by his wife Mary Clifford, daughter of James Clifford of Ware. His elder brother was Sir Coplestone Bampfylde, 3rd Baronet (c. 1689–1727) of Poltimore. The Bampfield family had been seated at Poltimore since about 1300.

Bampfylde married Elizabeth Basset, daughter of John Basset (1653–1686) of Heanton Punchardon and Umberleigh in Devon, five times MP for Barnstaple, Devon but there were no children before she died. He married secondly Margaret Warre (died 1758), daughter and heiress of Sir Francis Warre, 1st Baronet of Hestercombe, Somerset. He inherited Hestercombe House from his father-in-law in 1718 and began to lay out gardens there. The present gardens are largely the work of his son.

== Political career ==
Bampfyld was returned as Tory Member of Parliament for Exeter on the family interest at the 1715 general election. He was absent for some divisions, but voted against the Government on the repeal of the Occasional Conformity and Schism Acts. He was recorded as accepting £1,000 South Sea stock on 22 March 1720 without paying for it. He did not stand again at the 1722 general election. He was returned unopposed as MP for Devon at a by-election on 3 February 1736. He voted against the Spanish convention in 1739 but was absent from other divisions. He retired at the 1741 general election.

== Death and legacy ==
Bampfylde died on 17 September 1750. He had a son and two daughters by his second marriage.

- Col. Coplestone Warre Bampfylde (died 29 August 1791), Colonel of the Somerset Militia, who married Mary Knight, 2nd daughter of Edward Knight of Wolverley, Worcestershire, and died without issue. In 1818 John Knight II (died 1850) of Lea Castle, Wolverley, (father of Colonel Sir Frederick Winn Knight (1812-1897) KCB, MP) purchased the former Royal Forest of Exmoor, which adjoined the Manor of North Molton, Devon, a seat of the senior line of the Bampfylde family.
- Elizabeth Bampfylde (died 1802), who died unmarried.
- Margaretta Bampfylde (died December 1792), who on 31 December 1753 married George Tyndale (1704–1771). Their son John Tyndale inherited the Warre estate at Hestercombe

== Sources ==
- Matthews, Shirley, biography of Bampfylde, John (1691-1750), of Poltimore (sic), nr. Exeter, Devon, published in The History of Parliament: the House of Commons 1715-1754, ed. R. Sedgwick, 1970

Parliament of Great Britain
Preceded by John Rolle; Francis Drewe	Member of Parliament for Exeter; 1715–1722; With: Francis Drewe	Succeeded by Francis Drewe; John Rolle
Preceded by Sir William Courtenay, Bt; Henry Rolle	Member of Parliament for Devon; 1736–1741; With: Henry Rolle	Succeeded by Sir William Courtenay, Bt; Theophilus Fortescue
