= William Waters =

William Waters may refer to:

- William Waters (mayor) (died 1881), mayor in Nelson, New Zealand
- William Waters (architect), American architect
- W. F. Waters (1897–1968), Victorian Rover Scouting notable in Australia
- Joe Waters (musician) (William Joseph Waters, 1947–2008), American country music singer
- Billy Waters (busker) (c. 1778–1823), black man who busked in London
- Billy Waters (footballer, born 1994), English football forward
- Billy Waters (footballer, born 1931), Welsh football goalkeeper

== See also ==
- William Walters (disambiguation)
