= Henry Reginald Courtenay (MP) =

English politician

Member of Parliament for Honiton
- In office 1741-1747; 1754-1763

Personal details
- Born: 8 June 1714
- Died: 30 April 1763 (aged 48)
- Spouse: Catherine Bathurst (m. 1737)
- Children: 4, including Reginald
- Parent: William Courtenay (father)
- Relatives: William Courtenay (brother); Francis Courtenay (grandfather); James Bertie (grandfather)
- Education: Magdalen College, Oxford

Henry Reginald Courtenay (8 June 1714 – 30 April 1763) of Aldershot, Hampshire, was an English politician.

He was the second surviving son of Sir William Courtenay, 2nd Baronet of Powderham Castle, Devon and the younger brother of William Courtenay, 1st Viscount Courtenay. He was educated at Westminster School and Magdalen College, Oxford.

He was a Member (MP) of the Parliament of Great Britain for Honiton in 1741–1747 and 1754–30 April 1763.

On 14 April 1737, he married Lady Catherine Bathurst (d. 1783), daughter of Allen Bathurst, 1st Earl Bathurst. They had 2 sons and 2 daughters. One son was Reginald Courtenay (bishop of Exeter).

== Ancestry ==
Ancestors of Henry Reginald Courtenay (MP)

16. Francis Courtenay (d. 1638), son of Sir William Courtenay and Lady Elizabeth Manners
8. Sir William Courtenay, 1st Bt. (ca. 1628-1702)
17. Elizabeth Seymour, daughter of Sir Edward Seymour, 2nd Baronet
4. Francis Courtenay (d. 1699)
18. Gen. Sir William Waller
9. Margaret Waller (d. 1694)
19. Jane Reynell
2. Sir William Courtenay, 2nd Bt. (1675-1735)
5. Mary Boevey
1. Henry Reginald Courtenay
24. Robert Bertie, 1st Earl of Lindsey
12. Montagu Bertie, 2nd Earl of Lindsey
25. Hon. Elizabeth Montagu (d. 1654), daughter of Edward Montagu, 1st Baron Montagu of Boughton
6. James Bertie, 1st Earl of Abingdon
26. Edward Wray
13. Bridget Wray, Baroness Norris (1627-1657)
27. Elizabeth Wray, 3rd Baroness Norreys of Rycote
3. Lady Anne Bertie (d. 1718)
28. Francis Henry Lee, 2nd Bt. (d. ca. 1641)
14. Sir Henry Lee, 3rd Bt. (d. 1659)
29. Anne St. John (1614-ca. 1696), daughter of Sir John St John, 1st Baronet and Anne Leighton
7. Eleanora Lee (ca. 1658-1691)
30. Sir John Danvers
15. Ann Danvers (d. 1659)
31. Elizabeth Dauntsey (d. 1636)
