= William Walter =

William Walter may refer to:

- William Walter (MP for Buckingham) (died 1555), Member of Parliament for Buckingham 1553
- Sir William Walter (MP for Peterborough) (1574–1632), MP for Peterborough 1614, Ludgershall 1626 and Lichfield 1628
- William Walter (boxer) (born 1906), German boxer
- William Grey Walter (1910–1977), American neurophysiologist
- William Walter, partner in the Walter and Wilson architectural firm with James Keys Wilson
- William Walter (printer), founder of Scripture Gift Mission in 1888
- William W. Walter (1869-1941), American religious leader
- Sir William Walter, 1st Baronet (1604–1675), MP for Weobley
- William Walter (poet) (fl. 1520), English poet and translator

== See also ==
- William Walters (disambiguation)
