= Joe Waters =

Joe Waters may refer to:

- Joe Waters (footballer)
- Joe Waters (musician)

== See also ==
- Joseph Waters, American classical composer
- Joseph Waters (rugby union)
