= John Rolle Walter =

British politician (1714–1779)

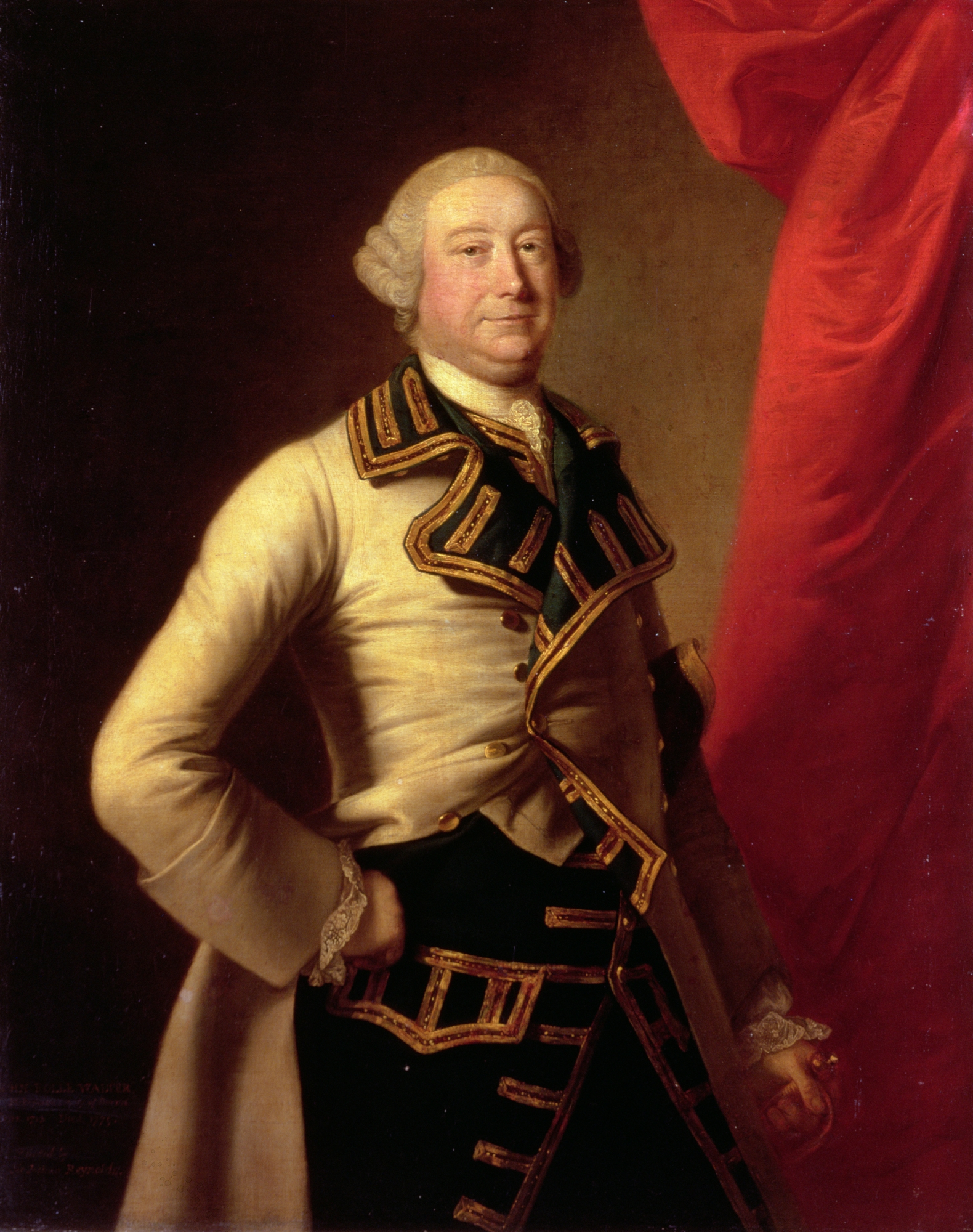
- John Rolle Walter (1712–1779) of Stevenstone, by Thomas Hudson (1701–1779) (or by Sir Joshua Reynolds). Private collection, image from Bridgeman Art Library, Image no. CH 24056. Two inferior copies of this portrait exist, see below.

Member of Parliament for Devon
- In office 1776-1779

Member of Parliament for Exeter
- In office 1754-1776

Personal details
- Born: c. 1714 England
- Died: 30 November 1779 (aged 64–65)
- Party: Tory
- Parent: John Rolle (father)
- Relatives: Henry Rolle (brother); Denys Rolle (brother); John Rolle (nephew); Denys Rolle (cousin)
- Education: New College, Oxford

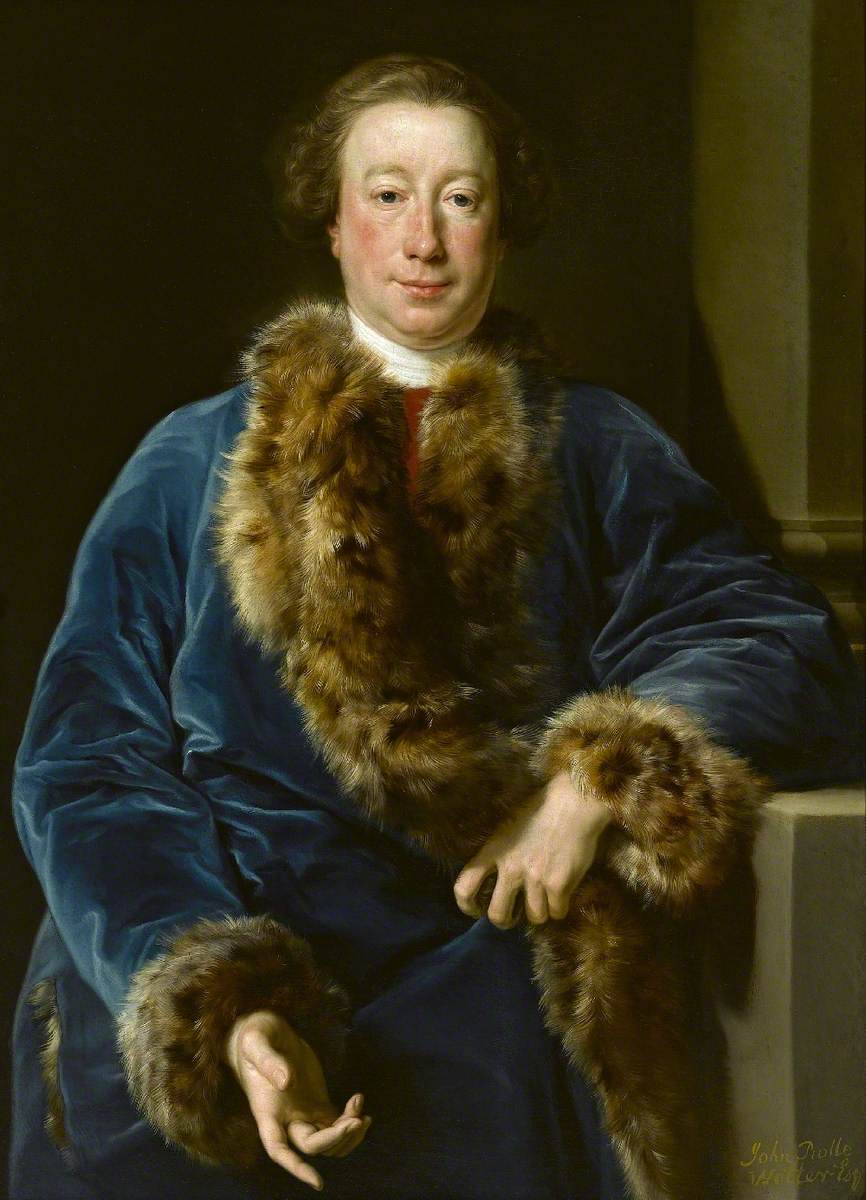
John Rolle Walter painted c. 1753 by Pompeo Batoni (1708–1787). Collection of Royal Albert Memorial Museum, Exeter. A replica hangs in Great Torrington Town Hall

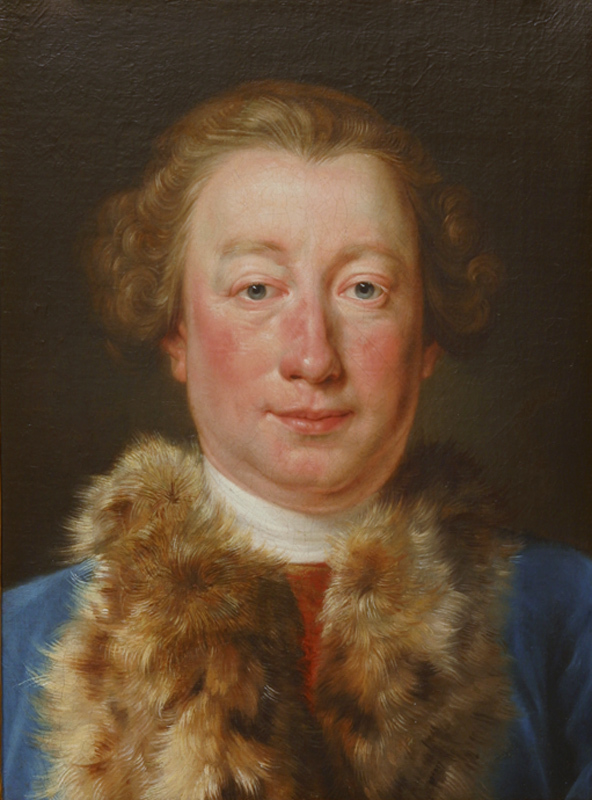
John Rolle Walter, preliminary study c.1753 by Pompeo Batoni, National Gallery of Denmark.

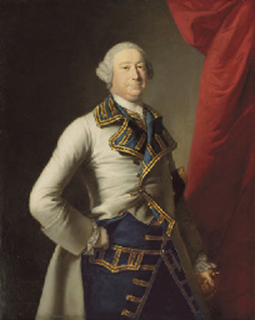
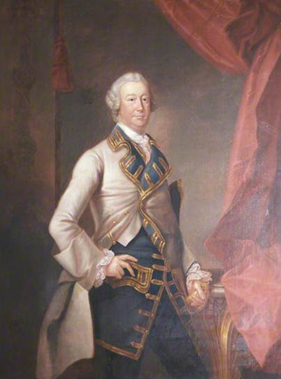
Inferior copies of Hudson portrait of John Rolle Walter: left: sold by Christie's, King St, London, 15 June 2001, sale no.6463, lot no. 23, realised £17,625; right: collection of Exeter Guildhall, presented in 1835 to the Mayor and Chamber by his nephew John Rolle, 1st Baron Rolle (d.1842), of Stevenstone

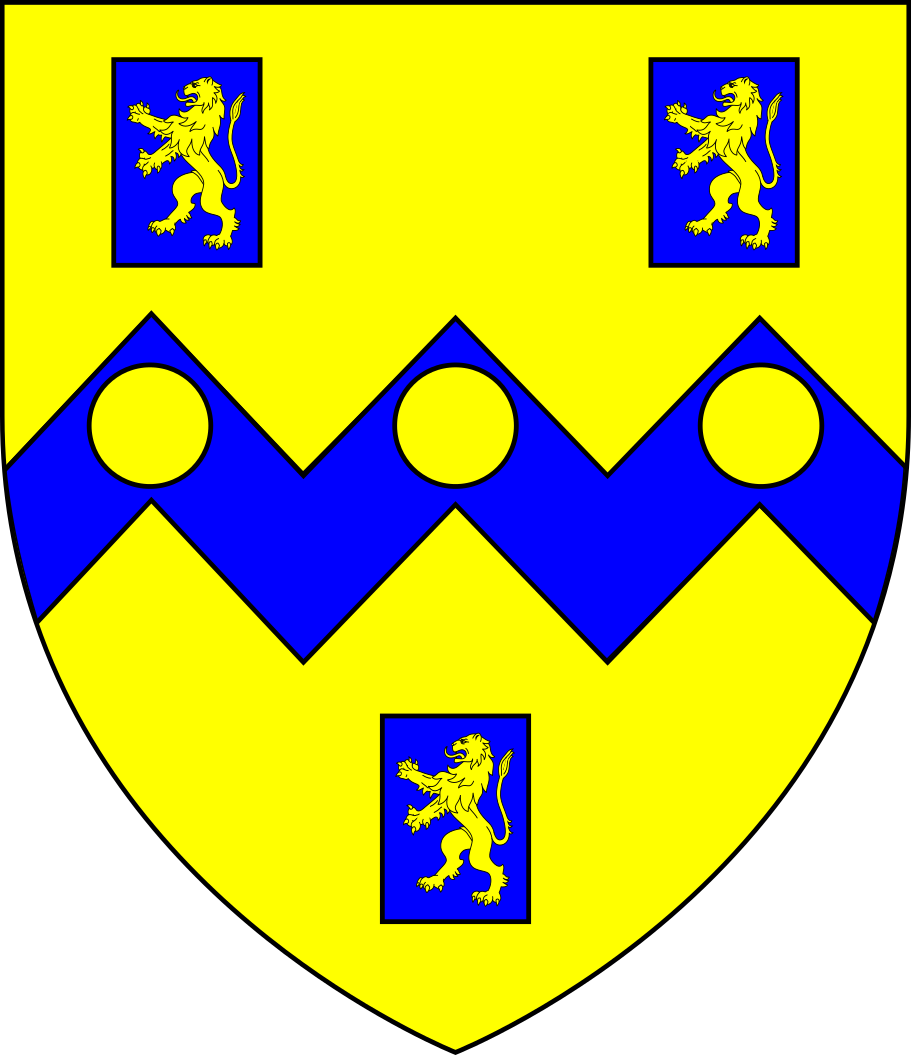
Arms of Rolle: Or, on a fesse dancettée between three billets azure each charged with a lion rampant of the first three bezants

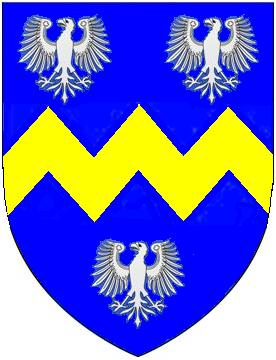
Arms of Walter of Sarsden: Azure, a fesse indented or between three eagles displayed argent

John Rolle Walter (c. 1714 – 30 November 1779) (born John Rolle) was Tory MP for Exeter in 1754–1776 and for Devon in 1776–1779. He held the honorary position of Town Recorder of Great Torrington in 1739–1779, due to his family's long-standing importance as the major local landowner.

== Origins ==
He was the second son of John Rolle (1679–1730), MP, of Stevenstone by his wife Isabella Charlotte Walter (d. 1734), daughter of Sir William Walter, 2nd Baronet(c. 1635–1694) of Sarsden, Oxfordshire. The Rolle family was one of the richest and most powerful in Devon and owned several dozen manors, their most ancient holding being Stevenstone near Great Torrington in the north of the county, whilst Bicton in the east was the centre of another large block of territory.

== Career ==
He was educated at New College, Oxford where he matriculated on 2 September 1729, aged 15. Two years later he inherited the estates of his uncle Sir Robert Walter, 4th Baronet (1680–1731), of Sarsden in Oxfordshire, who was childless and whose will directed his heir to adopt the name of Walter.

In 1750, he became the heir of his elder brother Henry Rolle, 1st Baron Rolle (1708–1750), of Stevenstone, who died without progeny. On 9 November 1776 he applied for the Stewardship of the Manor of East Hendred, a parliamentary formality to resign a seat in the House of Commons, to resign his seat for Exeter and to contest the more prestigious seat of Devon. Few of his parliamentary actions in the House of Commons survive in the records and no record exists of his having spoken in the House.

== Death and succession ==
He died unmarried and childless and his heir was his next younger brother Denys Rolle (1725–1797), the father of John Rolle, 1st Baron Rolle (1750–1842), which peerage had been created a second time for him.

== Portraits ==
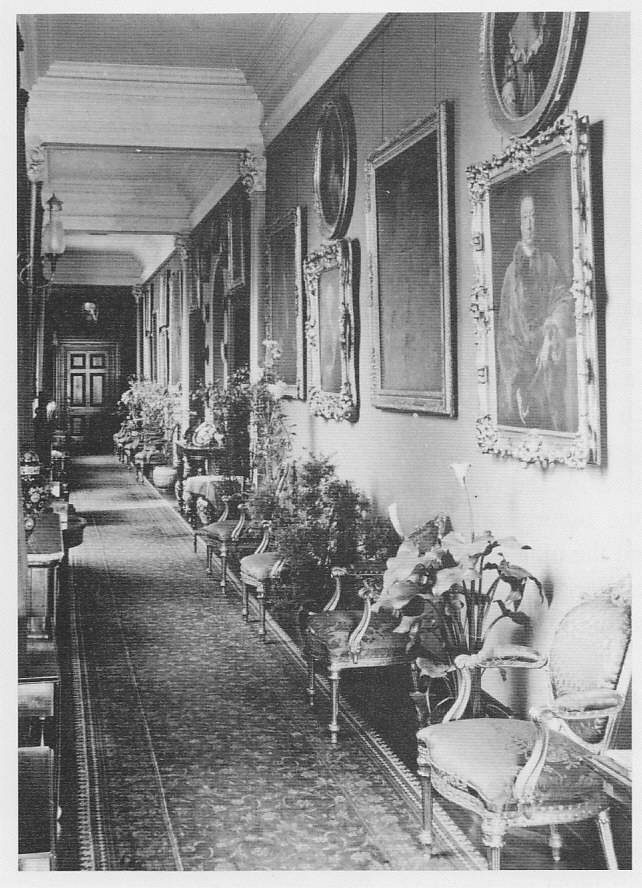
Corridor in Stevenstone House, c. 1907–1912, photo from auction catalogue published between 1907 (death of Hon. Mark Rolle) and 1912 (purchase by Capt. Clemson). The arrangement is as left by Mark Rolle. Visible in the right foreground is the portrait of John Rolle Walter (1712–1779) of Stevenstone, painted c. 1753 by Pompeo Batoni (1708–1787)

John Rolle Walter is not least remembered by the portraits (and copy portraits) painted of him, by Pompeo Batoni and Thomas Hudson (or Sir Joshua Reynolds), with two copies in existence of the latter, one a copy made by James Leakey, now in the collection of Exeter Guildhall having been donated by his nephew John Rolle, 1st Baron Rolle (d.1842) to the Corporation in about 1835. He sat for Batoni in 1753 whilst on his grand tour in Italy. Hudson also painted portraits of his brother Denys Rolle and of his wife Anne Chichester and of his sister Christiana Maria Rolle. The portraits by Batoni and Hudson/Reynolds hung in the Victorian mansion at Stevenstone built by Mark Rolle (1836–1907), demolished soon after his death, and the Batoni was later donated with several other Rolle family portraits to the "Great Torrington Almshouse, Town Lands and Poors Charities" by his heir Lord Clinton The painting hung in Great Torrington Town Hall virtually unnoticed for a few decades, until recognised by art valuers employed to identify saleable assets to fund building repairs of the Town Hall, the foundation stone of which had been laid by John Rolle Walter. Having become aware of the great value of the Batoni painting, the charity submitted it for auction at Christie's in 2007 with a reserve price of £300,000, but it was withdrawn at the last moment in order to allow a private offer at the same level to be made for it by the Royal Albert Memorial Museum in Exeter. The latter was successful in its public appeals for funds, assisted by the famous actress Joanna Lumley, and purchased the painting in 2008. After the flurry of publicity from the fund-raising exercise had settled, as of 2013 it is now held in permanent storage by the museum and is rarely placed on public display. A full-sized photographic replica was made and is displayed in Great Torrington Town Hall. Due to all the publicity, the National Gallery of Denmark was at last able to identify the sitter in its own portrait by Batoni, showing Rolle in a portrait bust in the same pose, a preliminary study for the larger portrait.

== Sources ==
- Drummond, Mary M., Biography published in History of Parliament, House of Commons 1754-1790, Namier, L. (Ed.), 1964
- Vivian, Lt.Col. J.L., (Ed.) The Visitations of the County of Devon: Comprising the Heralds' Visitations of 1531, 1564 & 1620, Exeter, 1895, pp. 652–656, pedigree of Rolle
- Pevsner, Nikolaus. & Cherry, Bridget, The Buildings of England: Devon, London, 1991
- Lauder, Rosemary, Vanished Houses of North Devon, Tiverton, 2005, Stevenstone House pp. 7–20
