= Henry Rolle, 1st Baron Rolle =

British landowner and politician (1708–1750)

The Right Honourable The Lord Rolle
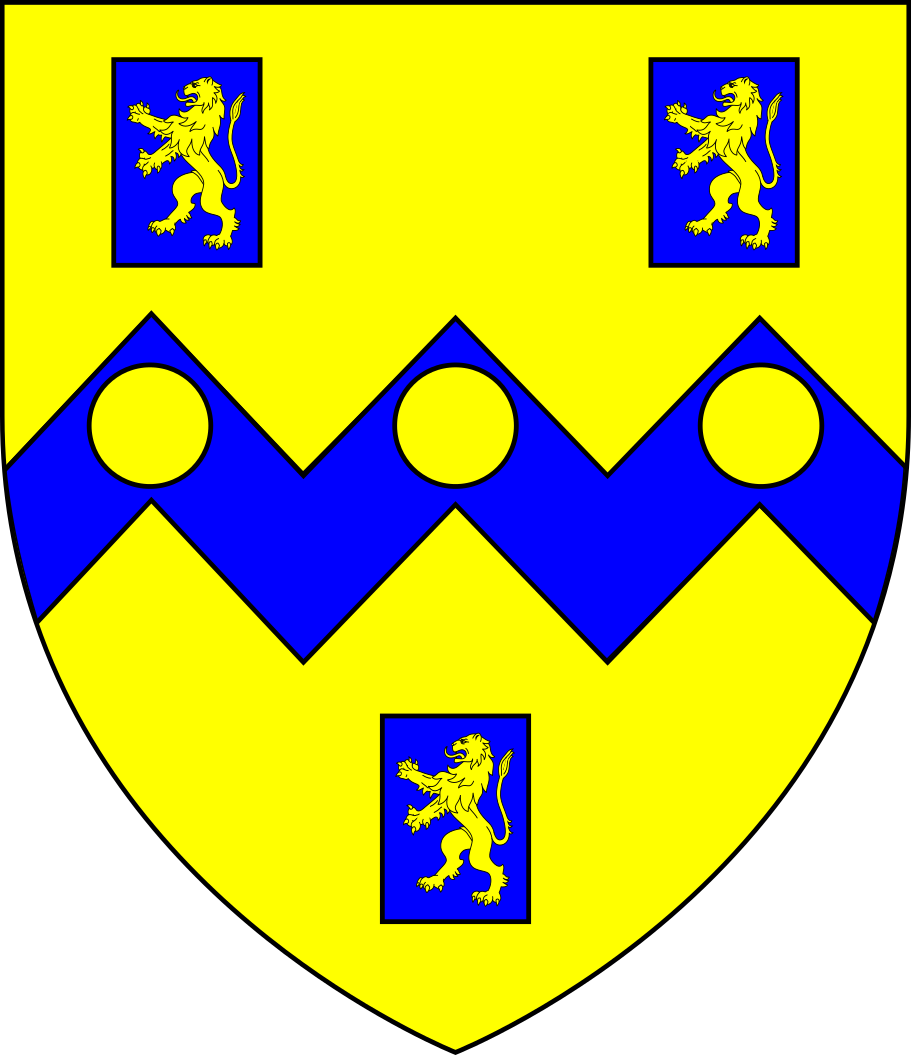
- Rolle's coat of arms: Or, on a fesse dancetté between three billets azure each charged with a lion rampant of the first three bezants

Member of Parliament for Barnstaple
- In office 1741-1748

Member of Parliament for Devon
- In office 1730-1741

Personal details
- Born: 7 November 1708 England
- Died: 17 August 1750 (aged 41)
- Parent: John Rolle (father)
- Relatives: John Rolle Walter (brother); Denys Rolle (brother); Denys Rolle (cousin); Bourchier Wrey (cousin)

Henry Rolle, 1st Baron Rolle (7 November 1708 – 17 August 1750) was a British landowner, peer and politician.

== Origins ==
Rolle was the eldest son of John Rolle (1679–1730), Member of Parliament for Devon (who had declined the offer of an earldom by Queen Anne) by his wife Isabella Walter, daughter of Sir William Walter, 2nd Baronet, of Saresden, Oxfordshire. His younger brother John Rolle Walter assumed the surname of Walter on succeeding to the estates of his maternal uncle and also represented Devon in Parliament.

== Career ==
Rolle succeeded his father as Member of Parliament for Devon on the latter's death in 1730, and held the seat until 1741. From 1741 to 1748 he represented Barnstaple in Parliament. In 1748 he was raised to the peerage as Baron Rolle of Stevenstone, in the County of Devon, and his vacated seat at Barnstaple was won by his first cousin Sir Bourchier Wrey, 6th Baronet (c. 1715–1784), of Tawstock, Devon.

== Death and succession ==
Lord Rolle died unmarried in August 1750, aged 41, when the barony became extinct. His estates devolved on his youngest brother Denys III Rolle (1725–1797), the father of John Rolle, 1st Baron Rolle, in whose favour the barony was recreated in 1796.

== Lands held ==
In 1731 Henry Rolle obtained the following inspeximus from King George II which effectively confirmed his title in part of his inheritance, namely various grants made by King Henry VIII to Sir Thomas Denys of Holcombe Burnell:

Inspeximus (at the request of Henry Rolle of Stevenstone), of a grant of Henry VIII (11 February. 31 Henry VIII), to Thomas Denys of Holcombe Burnell, Knt. for £1,127.3s.4d., of the Manors of Litlam alias Littelham and Exmouthe belonging to the late Monastery of Shirbourne, Dorset, in as full manner as the last Abbot held the same; also the messuage formerly in the tenure of Katherine Lytton in the parish of St. Peter-the-Less, in the ward of Beynardes Castell in London; which messuage lately belonged to the late Monastery of Croxden, Staffs and is worth 26s.8d. per year. Also the hundred of Budlegh alias East Budleigh which came to the King's hands by the attainder of Henry Courteney, late Marquis of Exeter. To hold by the following yearly rent, viz; for the Manors of Litlam and Exmouth, £6. 3s. 10d. for the messuage in London, 2s. 8d., the hundred of East Budleigh to be held by the 20th part of a Knight's fee without any rent.

East Budleigh and Bicton had been inherited by the Rolles by marriage to the Denys heiress.

== Sources ==
- Matthews, Shirley, biography of Henry Rolle (1708-50) published in History of Parliament: House of Commons 1715-1754, ed. R. Sedgwick, 1970

Parliament of Great Britain
Preceded by Sir William Courtenay, Bt; John Rolle	Member of Parliament for Devon; 1730–1741; With: Sir William Courtenay, Bt 1730–1736; John Bampfylde 1736–1741	Succeeded by Sir William Courtenay, Bt; Theophilus Fortescue
Preceded by Theophilus Fortescue; John Basset	Member of Parliament for Barnstaple; 1741–1748; With: John Harris 1741–1747; Thomas Benson 1747–1748	Succeeded by Thomas Benson; Sir Bourchier Wrey, Bt
Peerage of Great Britain
New creation	Baron Rolle; 1748–1750	Extinct
