= Denys Rolle (died 1797) =

British politician

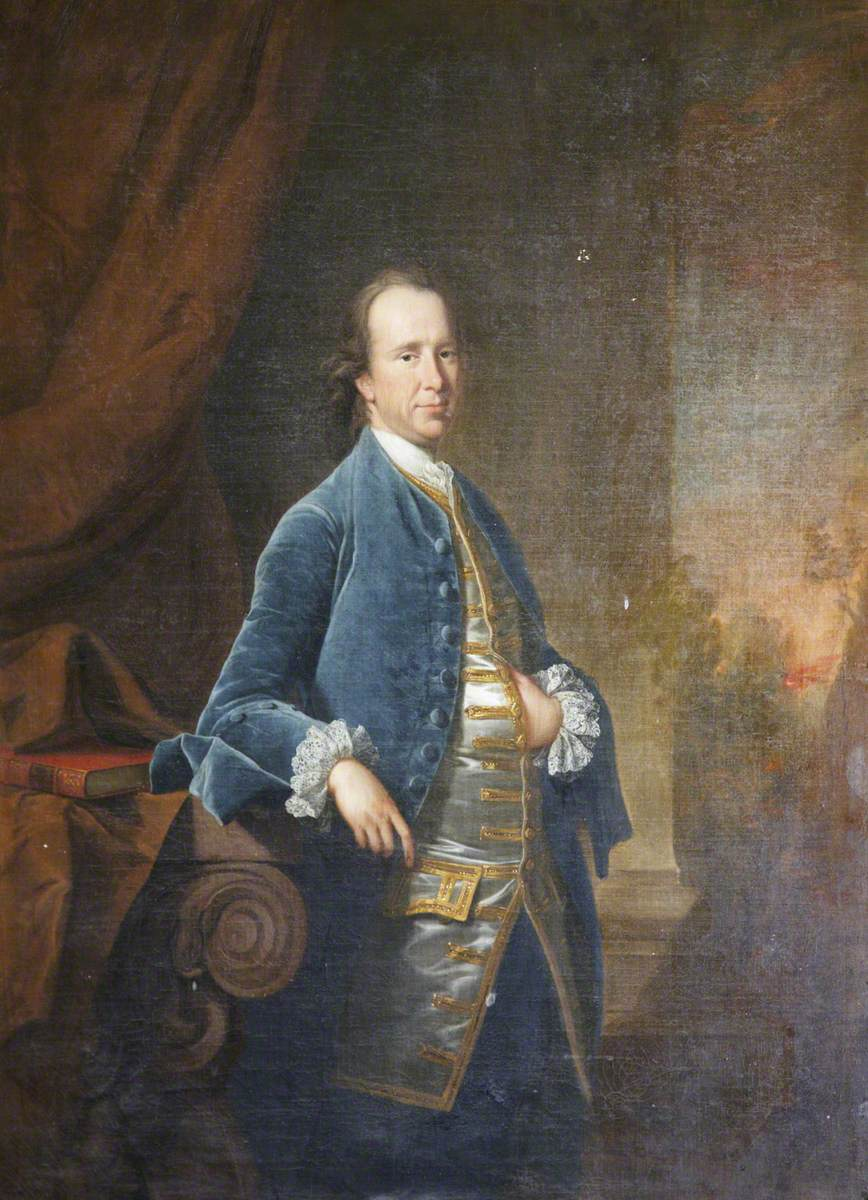
- Portrait of Denys Rolle by Thomas Hudson

Member of Parliament for Barnstaple
- In office 1761–1774

Personal details
- Born: c.1725 England
- Died: 26 June 1797 (aged 71–72) Devon, England
- Spouse: Anne Chichester (m. 1750; died 1781)
- Children: 8, including John
- Parent: John Rolle (father)
- Relatives: Henry Rolle (brother); John Rolle Walter (brother); Denys Rolle (cousin)
- Education: New College, Oxford

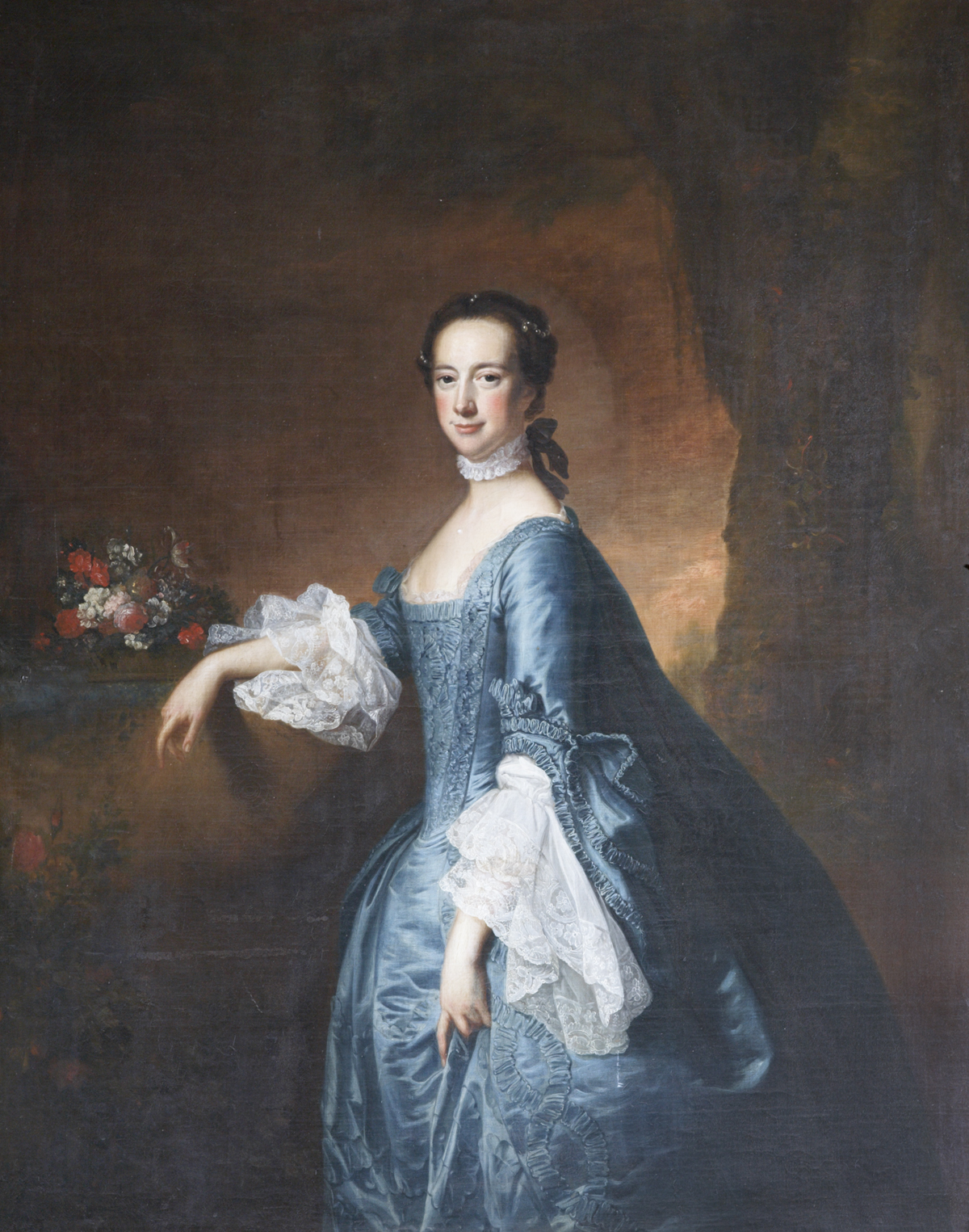
Portrait of Rolle's wife Anne Chichester, by Thomas Hudson

Denys Rolle (c. 1725 – 26 June 1797) was a British politician and landowner who was an independent member of parliament for Barnstaple between 1761 and 1774. He inherited a large number of estates and by the time of his death he was the largest landowner in Devon. He was a philanthropist and generous benefactor to charities and religious societies.

Rolle spent much of his life in Florida attempting to establish an "ideal society", a utopian colony of British settlers named Rollestown or Charlotta. The project was a failure and Rolle recorded his colonial adventure in great detail in a lengthy official complaint made in 1765 to the British government entitled The Humble Petition of Denys Rolle, Esq., Setting Forth the Hardships, Inconveniences, and Grievances Which Have Attended Him in His Attempts to Make a Settlement in East Florida, Humbly Praying Such Relief as in their Lordships Wisdom Shall Seem Meet.

His colonists having failed to live up to his ambitious expectations and having largely deserted him, he turned to slave labour and following the loss of Florida as a British possession in 1783 he moved his colony to a smaller site on Exuma in the Bahama Islands.

== Life and family ==
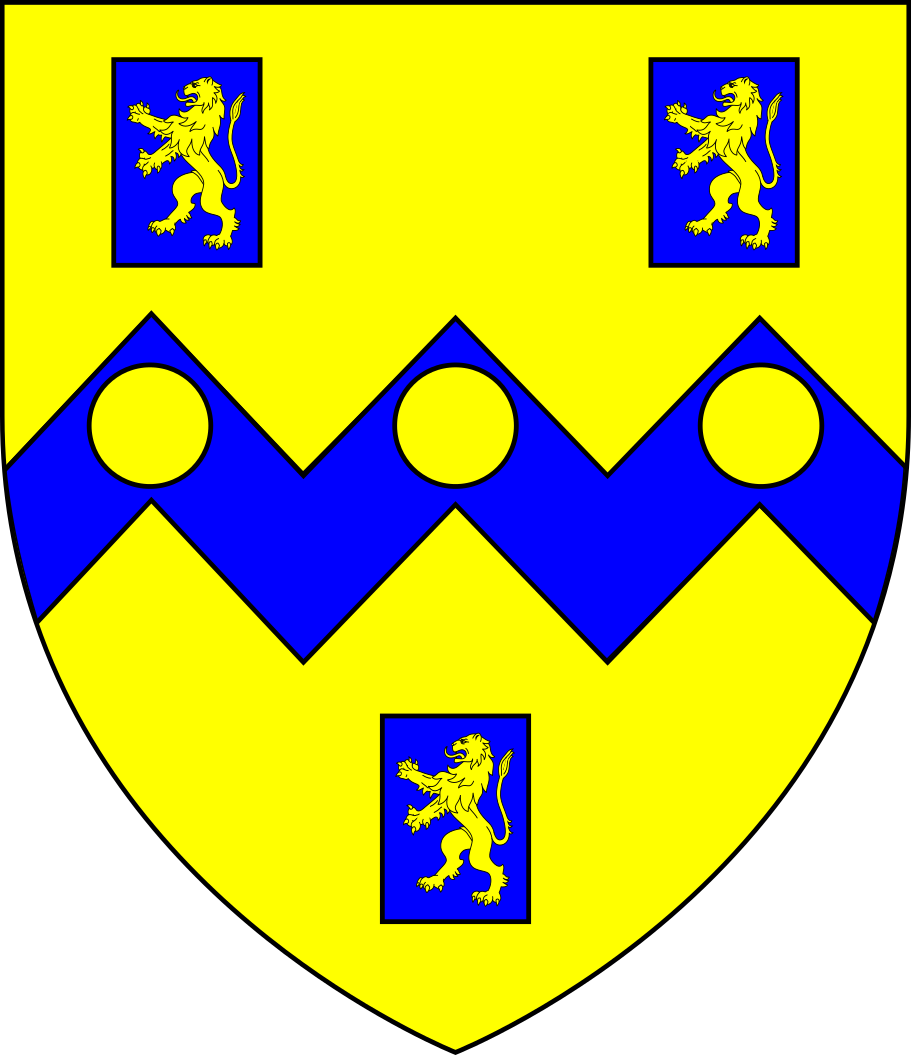
Arms of Rolle: Or, on a fesse dancetté between three billets azure each charged with a lion rampant of the first three bezants

The Rolle family was one of the richest and most powerful in Devon and owned several dozen manors, their most ancient holding being Stevenstone near Great Torrington in the north of the county, whilst Bicton (inherited from the Denys family, after whom he was named) in the south-east was the centre of another large block of territory.

=== Early life ===
Denys Rolle was the youngest of four sons of John Rolle (1679–1730), of Bicton and Stevenstone, by his wife Isabella Charlotte Walter, daughter of Sir William Walter, 2nd Baronet of Sarsden, Oxfordshire. His eldest brother was Henry Rolle, 1st Baron Rolle (died 1759) of Stevenstone, whose heir was his next younger brother John Rolle Walter (c. 1714 – 1779), who was a Tory MP. Denys was baptised on 19 July 1725 in St Giles's Church, St Giles in the Wood, the parish church of Stevenstone. He matriculated at New College, Oxford on 19 January 1742, at the age of 16.

He was named after his cousin Denys Rolle (1614–1638), of Stevenstone, who had inherited Bicton and other lands from his mother Ann Denys, a co-heiress of the ancient Devon family of Denys of Holcombe Burnell.

=== Marriage and children ===
On 22 May 1750 in East Down, Devon, Denys Rolle married Anne Chichester (1721–1781), a daughter (by his second wife) of Arthur Chichester (1670-1737/8) of Hall, Bishop's Tawton, Devon, a junior line of the ancient and prominent Chichester family of Raleigh. By Anne he had the following children:

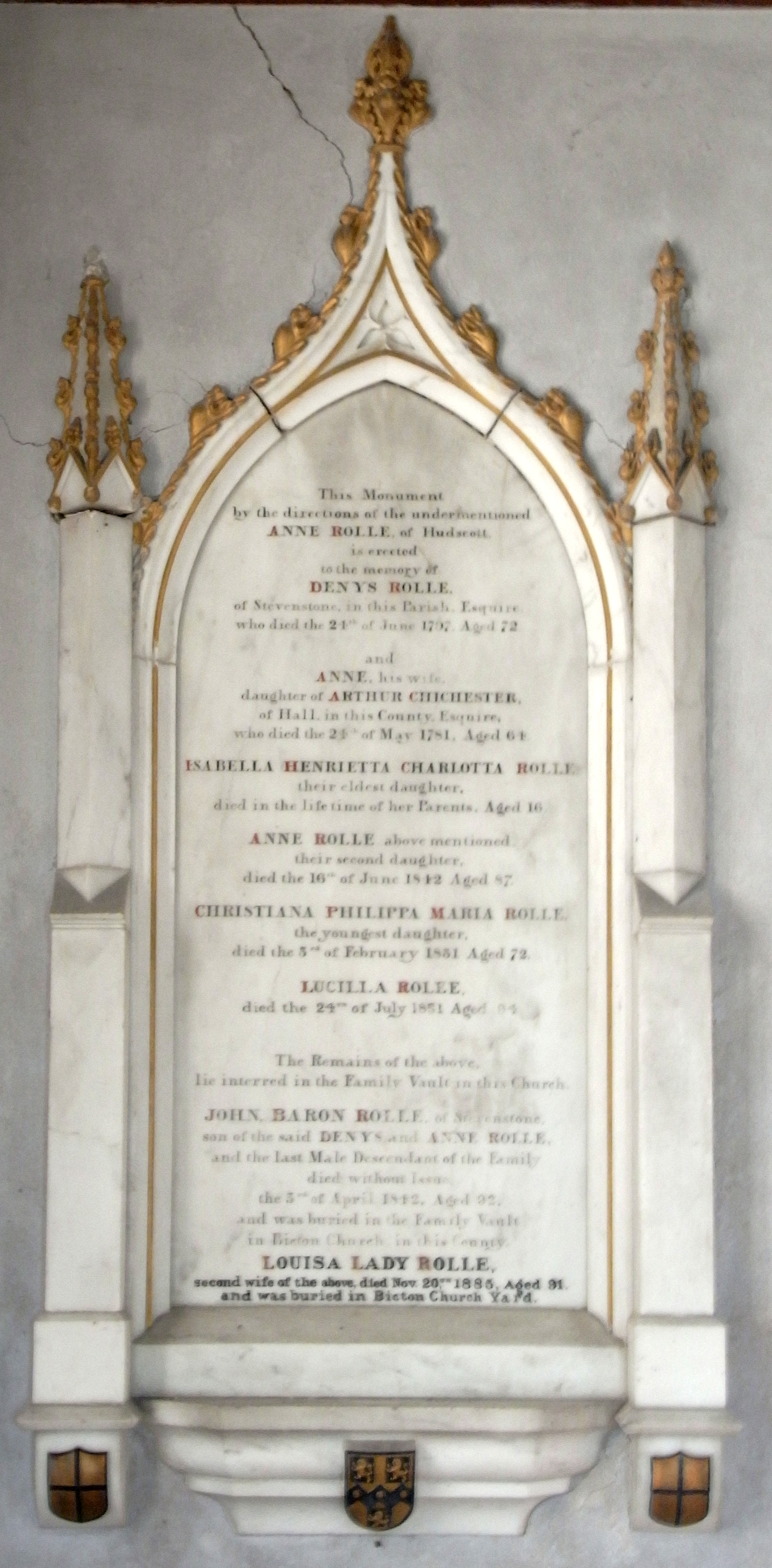
Mural monument in St Giles Church erected by order of Rolle's daughter, Anne

- John Rolle, 1st Baron Rolle (1751–1842), eldest son and heir, baptised at Chittlehampton
- Denys Bruce Rolle (born 1758), presumed died young, baptised at Chittlehampton
- Samuel Rolle (born 1759), presumed died young, baptised at Chittlehampton
- Isabella Henrietta Charlotte Rolle (1754–1770), eldest daughter, died aged 16, baptised at Chittlehampton
- Anne Rolle (1755–1842), 2nd daughter, baptised at East Tytherley, died 16 June 1842 aged 87. In her old age she was allowed by her brother Lord Rolle to live with her sister Lucilla at Hudscott
- Lucilla Rolle (1757–1851), baptised at East Tytherley, died 24 July 1851 aged 94. In her old age she was allowed by her brother Lord Rolle to live with her sister Anne at Hudscott but after the latter's death and the death of Lord Rolle both in 1842 she was declared a lunatic in 1846.
- Christiana Philippa Maria Rolle (1759–1831), died 3 February 1831, Aged 72.
- Florence Rolle (born 1762)

=== Character ===
A modest man, considered eccentric, his favourite pastime was to perform the work of a common farm-labourer. He was puritanical in morals, opposing ale-houses, cockfighting and bear-baiting, and was humane and tender towards animals claiming a special kinship with wildlife. He has also been described by Theresa Ann White as stubborn, high-handed, irascible, litigious, and a megalomaniac, even stupid, and lacking diplomatic skills.

== Parliamentary career ==
Rolle was elected MP for Barnstaple in 1761 but after 1764 most of his time was occupied by his colony in Florida rather than Barnstaple or national politics. He was re-elected in 1768. Although not attached to any party, Rolle voted with the Opposition when he was at Parliament but seems not to have spoken in the House. He lost his seat at the general election of 1774 being defeated by William Devaynes, a supporter of the government.

== Property in England ==
=== Inheritances ===
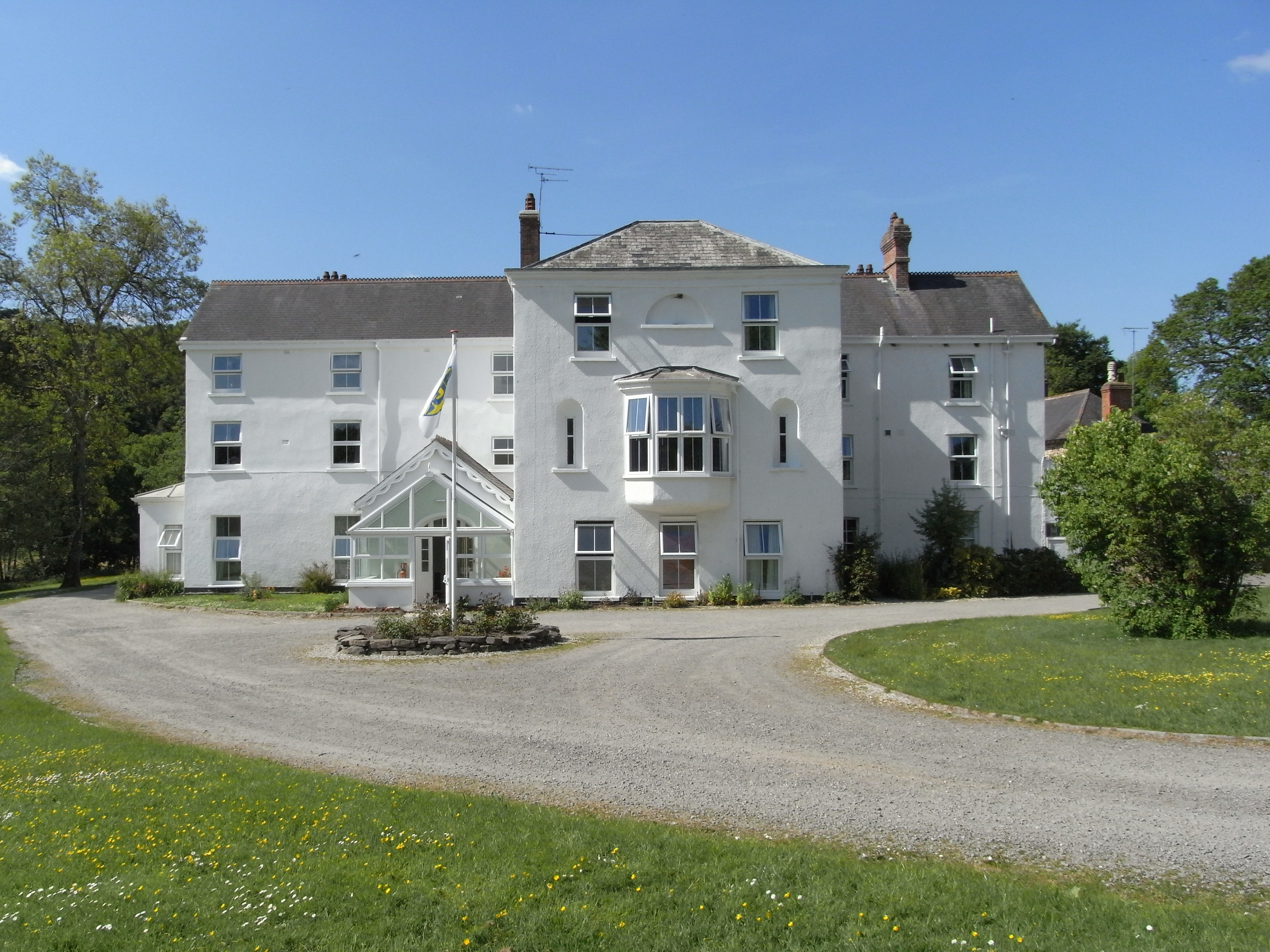
Beam House, Great Torrington

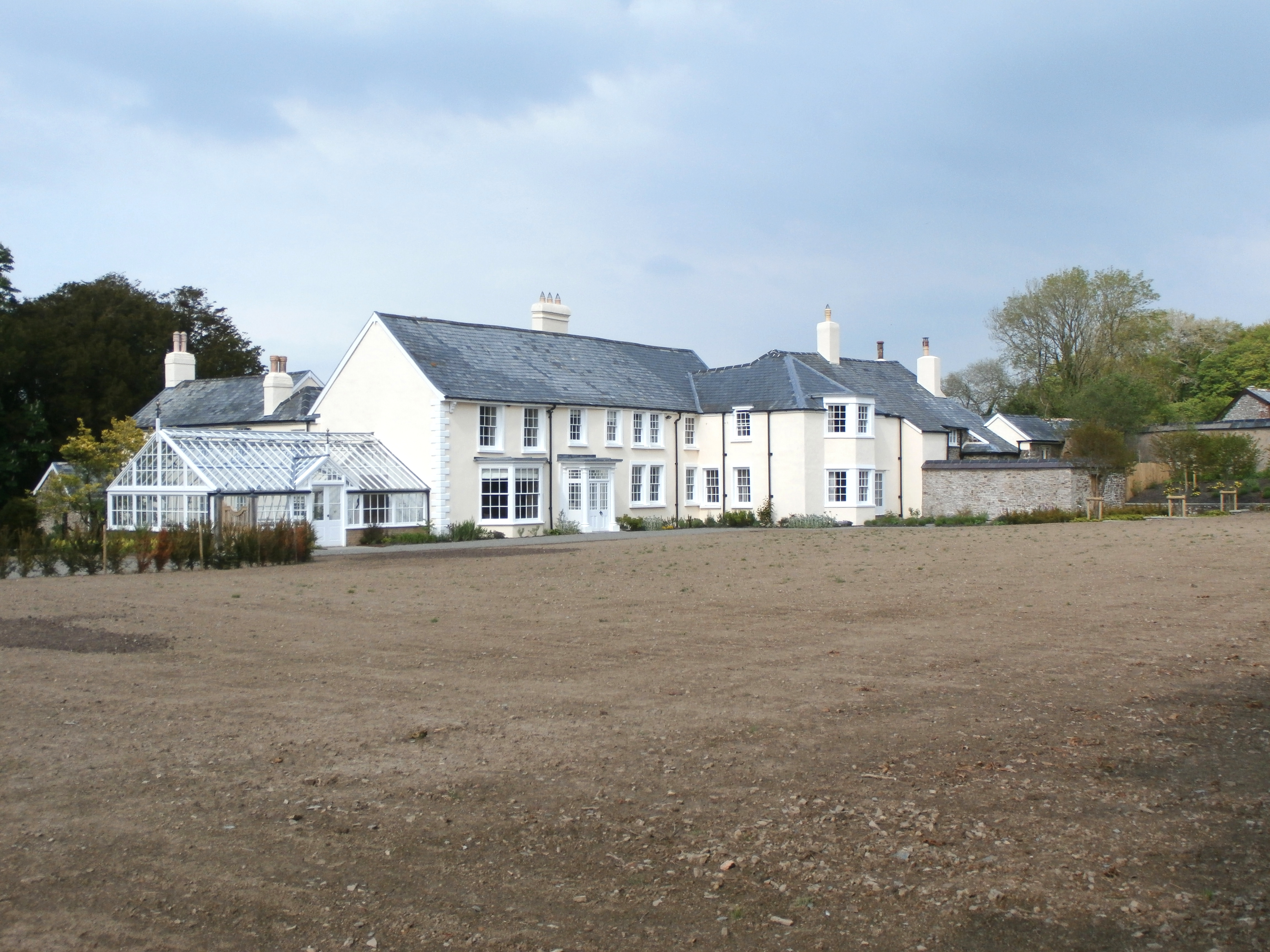
Hudscott, Chittlehampton

As the fourth son Denys Rolle had been born with no expectation of inheriting the vast Rolle estates of his father. He had been provided for his residence with the Rolle manor of Beam near Great Torrington. However he received a three-fold inheritance which, together with his own land purchases around Otterton in South Devon, meant that on his death he was the largest land owner in the county of Devon, the second largest county in England, with a rent-roll of £40,000 per annum.

His eldest brother Henry Rolle, 1st Baron Rolle (died 1759) had inherited his paternal estates in 1730 but died childless in 1759. His younger brother John Rolle Walter (c. 1714–1779) was his heir. In 1731, at the age of 17, John inherited the Oxfordshire lands of his childless uncle Sir Robert Walter, 4th Baronet (1680–1731), of Sarsden in Oxfordshire and had changed his name to Walter, as required by the bequest. The third brother, William Rolle (1720 – c.1747) of Beam, died childless some time after 1747 which left Denys Rolle as the heir to the Rolle and Walter lands.

Denys also inherited the estate of Hudscott in the parish of Chittlehampton, Devon, from his distant childless cousin Samuel Rolle (1704–1747) son and heir of Samuel Rolle (1669–1735) of Hudscott, MP for Barnstaple. This inheritance included a moiety of the manor of Countisbury in North Devon. He also inherited the manors of East Tytherley in Somerset and Shapwick in Somerset, which had been acquired by his cousin Henry Rolle (1589–1656), Chief Justice of the King's Bench, descended from the most junior Rolle line. Thus at the age of about 21 Denys Rolle had inherited Hudscott, where he lived during most of his life and where several of his children were baptised.

In 1779, at the age 54, following the death of his brother John Rolle Walter, he inherited the paternal Rolle estates of Stevenstone and Bicton.

=== Otterton and East Budleigh ===
In 1786 he purchased for the huge sum of £72,000 the manors of Otterton and East Budleigh, situated adjacent to Bicton in south-east Devon from the heirs of the Duke family, descendants of Richard Duke (died 1572) who in 1540 had purchased the former lands of Otterton Priory following the Dissolution of the Monasteries. The properties acquired included:

Capital messuage, barton farm and demesne lands of Otterton and the manors and lordships of Otterton, Little Otterton, Budleigh Poleslow (otherwise Higher Budleigh), Budleigh Syon (otherwise Lower Budleigh), Collaton Rawleigh (otherwise the Lower Manor), Dukes-Collaton, (otherwise Collaton Abbott otherwise The Higher Manor), Dotton (otherwise Docton) and Hays (otherwise Powershays otherwise Dukes Hayes); 4 water grist mills in Otterton and the advowsons of the churches of Otterton, Budleigh and Harpford with the free chapels of Withecombe, Fen Ottery, Rectory and Sheaf of Otterton and a fee farm rent of £13. 10s., payable out of the sheaf of Sidmouth, etc.

=== Land sales ===
Rolle sold his Somerset estate of Shapwick in 1786/7 to George Templer (1755–1819), of the East India Company, 4th son of James I Templer (1722–1782) of Stover, Teigngrace.

== North American plantations ==
=== Florida ===
In May 1764 Rolle obtained a grant from the crown of 20,000 acres of land for a plantation in St Mark's in East Florida, an area recently ceded by Spain to Great Britain following the Seven Years' War. One of the numerous conditions was that he should settle it with white Protestants. His vision was to establish an "ideal society", a Utopian colony for poor, homeless or criminal English persons.

He embarked for America on 10 June 1764 with 14 settlers and arrived at Charleston on 12 August 1764 and was in St Augustine, capital of East Florida, by September 1764. He soon discovered that this land was unsuitable and instead, with the permission of the Governor of East Florida James Grant (1720–1806), settled on the east bank of the St Johns River, above today's East Palatka, which site he named Charlotta in honour of the Queen, later Charlotia, later Rollestown, thought to be on the site of today's San Mateo.

Having quarrelled with Governor Grant and been refused further grants of land, he returned to England in October 1765. There he addressed his long and detailed "Humble Petition" to the Board of Trade complaining of his treatment. He returned to Florida however in September 1766 with a further 50 settlers. He returned to England again in January 1768, and again complained to the Board of Trade. Rolle's settlers were in the opinion of observers deemed low quality, of poor morality, undisciplined, and not capable of hard work. Soon due to Rolle's harsh management style and their own unsuitability his colonists rebelled and deserted to Georgia or South Carolina, whereupon Rolle gave up his Utopian ideals and used African slave labour. The plantation produced among other crops rice, corn and turpentine tar from pine trees for naval use. He acquired a further 20,000 acres from William Elliot and 20,000 from John Grayhurst, 10,000 from William Penrice and 3,000 from James Cusack, all on the eastern side of the St Johns River. He acquired a further 1,500 acres on the west side from Joseph Gray.

Rollestown was visited in December 1765 by the naturalists John Bartram and his son William Bartram, and again in 1778, the latter who recorded his observations in a journal which survives. Rolle's activities were also recorded in the diary, correspondence and official reports of the Governor of Florida James Grant, who became increasingly infuriated by Rolle's constant demands, complaints and disputes

=== Bahamas ===
Following the Treaty of Versailles in 1783, Florida was ceded by the British government to Spain and Rolle was thus forced to abandon his colony. He suffered great financial loss and claimed substantial compensation from the British government, which offered him instead a colony on the British island of Exuma in the Bahama Islands, about 500 miles to the south-east, to which he removed whatever livestock, equipment and slaves he was able to transport.

When the slaves (about 400 at this time) of his son and heir, Lord John Rolle, were officially declared free on 1 August 1838, many of them adopted the surname of Rolle. The slaves then took over the Rolle lands on Exuma and ran them communally although there was no formal deed of conveyance to them. Today, there are still five Lord John Rolle Commonage Estates on Exuma including the village of Rolle Town. These have been passed down to the descendants of the former slaves and cannot be sold.

Although the name Rolle died out in England on the death of Lord Rolle in 1842 (revived for a while in the person of his heir Mark Rolle), the surname Rolle is still a common name in the Bahamas. Rolles of Bahamian descent include the actress Esther Rolle, born in Pompano Beach, Florida of Bahamian parents, Myron Rolle, professional (American) football player and Rhodes Scholar; and Magnum Rolle, a professional basketball player born in Freeport, Bahamas in 1986.

== Philanthropy ==
He was a philanthropist and generous benefactor to charities and religious societies. Rolle established several charity schools on different parishes and allocated to each a plot of land for the employment of the children. In 1790 he rebuilt part of St Giles's Church, the parish church of Stevenstone, which is commemorated by a stone heraldic escutcheon above the north transept door inscribed "DR 1790".

== Death ==
Rolle died on 26 June 1797, aged 72, of angina during one of his habitual long walks between his manors of Hudscott and Stevenstone, and was buried in St Giles's Church on 1 July 1797 The vicar and historian of Chittlehampton, Rev. J.H.B. Andrews, wrote:

Deadman's, later known as South Nethercleave, where the house is now derelict, was 65 acres. This is said to take its name from the fact that Denys Rolle, who although he was the richest man in Devonshire always preferred to walk, died under a tree there in 1797 while walking from Hudscott to Stevenstone.

In St Giles Church, St Giles in the Wood, there is a mural monument to Rolle, erected by Anne, his second daughter.

== Sources ==
- Vivian, Lt.Col. J.L., ed. (1895). The Visitations of the County of Devon: Comprising the Heralds' Visitations of 1531, 1564 & 1620. Exeter: College of Arms.
- Stork, Dr William; Rolle, Denys (1766). An Extract from the Account of East Florida Published by Dr Stork who Resided a Considerable Time in Augustine the Metropolis of that Province, with the Observations of Denys Rolle who Formed a Settlement on St John's River in the Province of East Florida with his Proposals to Such Persons as may be Inclined to Settle Thereon. London.

Parliament of Great Britain
Preceded by John Harris; George Amyand	Member of Parliament for Barnstaple; 1761–1774; With: George Amyand to 1766; John Clevland from 1766	Succeeded by William Devaynes; John Clevland
