= William Walters =

William, Bill, or Billy Walters may refer to:

- William Walters (outlaw) (1869–1921), also known as "Bronco Bill", outlaw during the closing days of the Old West
- William Melmoth Walters (1835–1925), president of the Incorporated Law Society
- William Thompson Walters (1820–1894), American businessman and art collector
- William Walters (priest), archdeacon of Worcester, 1889–1911
- Willie Walters (1907–1994), South African athlete
- William Walters (MP) (died 1417), cloth merchant and member of the Parliament of England for Salisbury
- William Walters (baseball), see Pennsylvania Sports Hall of Fame
- Billy Walters (gambler) (born 1946), American professional gambler and insider trader
- Billy Walters (photographer), see Daily Bugle
- Billy Walters (rugby league) (born 1994), Australian
- Bill Walters (Arkansas politician) (1943–2013), American politician
- Bill Walters (baseball), see Midwest League
- Bill Walters (musician) in Blue Stone

== See also ==
- William Waters (disambiguation)
- William Walter (disambiguation)
