= Samuel Molyneux =

British amateur astronomer and politician (1689–1728)

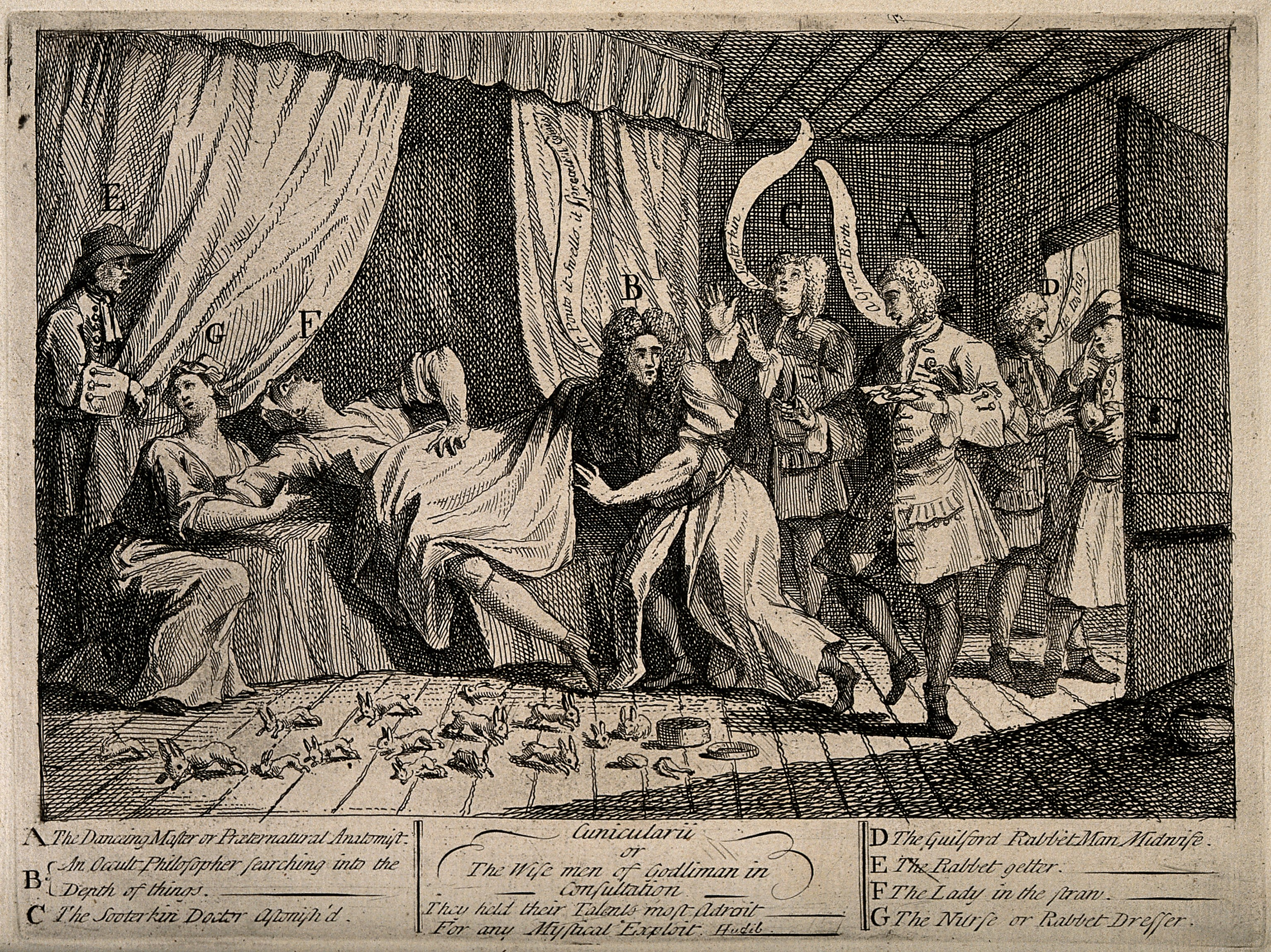
- Samuel Molyneux
- Born: 16 July 1689; Chester, England
- Died: 13 April 1728 (aged 38); Kew
- Known for: Aberration of light
- Scientific career
- Fields: Astronomy

Samuel Molyneux FRS (16 July 1689 – 13 April 1728) was an amateur astronomer and politician who sat in the British House of Commons between 1715 and 1728 and in the Irish House of Commons from 1727 to 1728. His work with James Bradley attempting to measure stellar parallax led to the discovery of the aberration of light. The aberration was the first definite evidence that the earth moved and that Copernicus and Kepler were correct. In addition to his astronomical works, Molyneux wrote about the natural history and other features of Ireland. He died in suspicious circumstances.

== Early life ==
Molyneux was born in Chester, England in 1689 and was the second son of William Molyneux, who was known for his work related to optics. His mother was Lucy Domville, daughter of Sir William Domville, the Attorney General for Ireland. Molyneux studied at Trinity College Dublin, where he earned a Bachelor of Arts (BA) in 1708 and a Master of Arts (MA) in 1710. He was elected a Fellow of the Royal Society in 1712.

== Astronomical work ==
Molyneux is best known for his work with Bradley in attempting to measure the parallax of Gamma Draconis leading to the discovery of the aberration of light. Molyneux was interested in detecting parallax that others such as Robert Hooke had attempted but failed to detect. Unlike Hooke, Molyneux had large amounts of patience and had resources to expend. Like Hooke, Molyneux decided to take advantage of Gamma Draconis being a star that passes directly overhead in London, minimizing the effects of atmospheric refraction on its apparent position when it does so. Molyneux commissioned a larger set of telescopes and employed James Bradley as an expert who had more astronomical and mathematical knowledge. Working together, Bradley and Molyneux performed over 80 observations to a precision of greater than 1 arcsecond from December 1725 until late in 1727. Measurements of this precision had never before been performed with telescopes. Bradley and Molyneux were surprised to find that rather than detect a parallax they detected an unexplained wobble of the star. Moreover, similar wobbles were found by Bradley using another high-precision telescope for some 200 other stars. Molyneux died shortly before Bradley realized that the observed changes they were seeing was in fact due to the aberration of light.

== Political career ==
Molyneux was Member of Parliament (MP) for Bossiney in Cornwall from 1715 to 1722, for St Mawes from 1726 to 1727, and for Exeter from 1727 to 1728. He served as Secretary to the Prince of Wales from 1715 to 1727 and as Lord of the Admiralty from 1727 to 1728. Between 1727 and 1728 he represented Dublin University in the Irish House of Commons.

== Death and legacy ==
Molyneux married Lady Elizabeth Capel, daughter of Algernon Capell, 2nd Earl of Essex, on 5 April 1717. In 1728, he suffered a fit while in the House of Commons. He was treated by court anatomist Nathaniel St André, but the treatment did not prove successful, and Molyneux died in Kew in April. On the night of the death, St André eloped with Molyneux's wife, Elizabeth, the two marrying in 1730. Samuel Madden, a relative of Molyneux's, claimed that St André had poisoned the MP. Although St André won an action for defamation, he found himself unable to secure regular work.

== Notes ==
Parliament of Great Britain
Preceded by Sir William Pole, Bt; Paul Orchard	Member of Parliament for Bossiney with Henry Cartwright; 1715–1722	Succeeded by Robert Corker; Henry Kelsall
Preceded by Sidney Godolphin; Samuel Travers	Member of Parliament for St Mawes with Sidney Godolphin; 1726–1727	Succeeded by Henry Vane; John Knight
Preceded by Francis Drewe; John Rolle	Member of Parliament for Exeter with Francis Drewe; 1727–1728	Succeeded by Francis Drewe; John Rolle
Parliament of Ireland
Preceded by Edward Hopkins; Marmaduke Coghill	Member of Parliament for Dublin University; 1727–1728; With: Marmaduke Coghill	Succeeded by John Elwood; Marmaduke Coghill
