= Sir William Courtenay, 2nd Baronet =

English landowner and politician

Member of Parliament for Devon
- In office 1701-1707; 1707-1710; 1712-1735

Lord Lieutenant of Devon
- In office 1714–1716

Member of Parliament for Honiton
- In office 1715-1716

Personal details
- Born: 11 March 1676
- Died: 6 October 1735 (aged 59)
- Party: Tory
- Spouse: Anne Bertie (m. 1704)
- Children: 12, including William and Henry
- Parent: Francis Courtenay (father)
- Relatives: William Courtenay (grandfather)

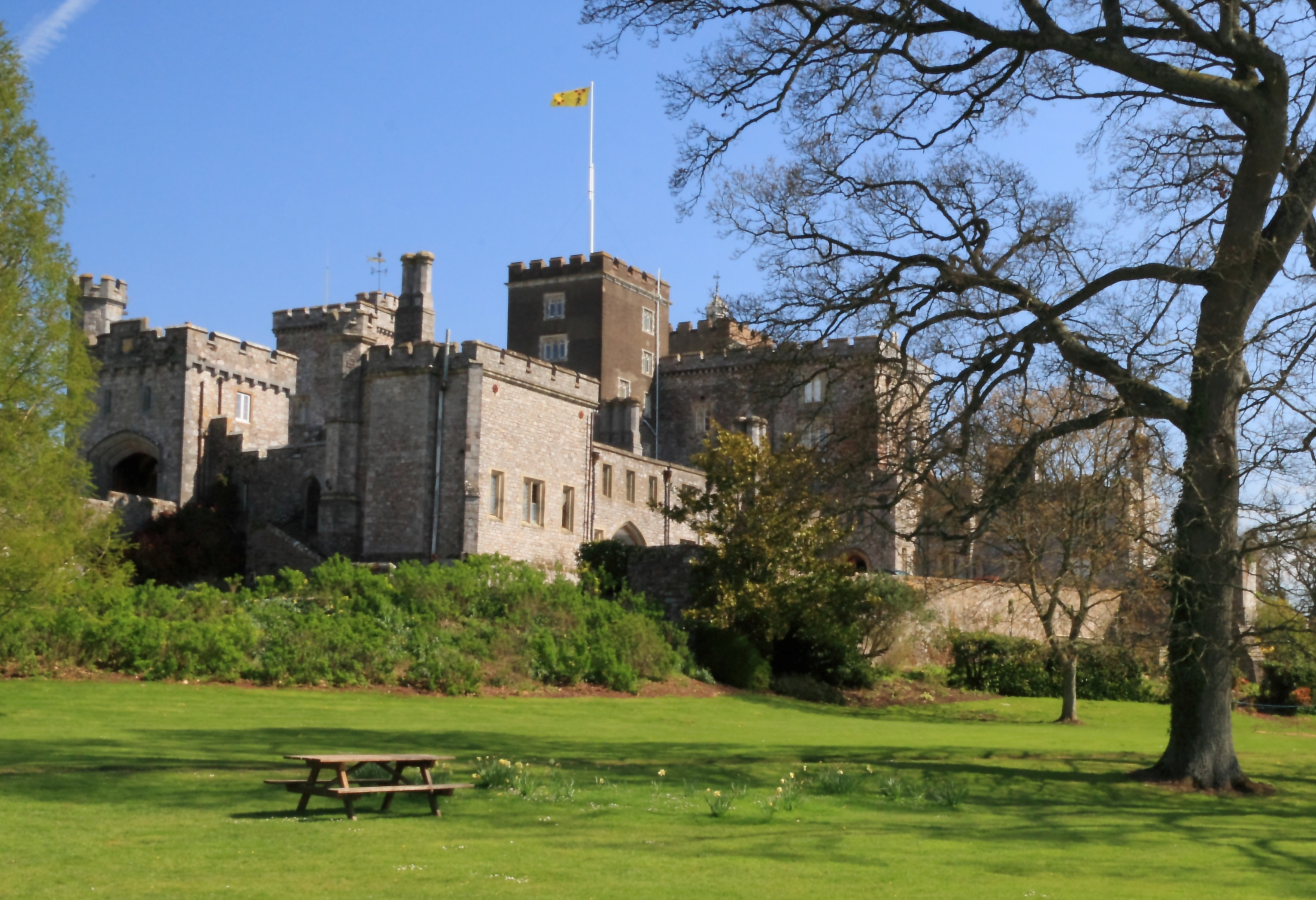
Powderham Castle

Sir William Courtenay, 2nd Baronet (11 March 1676 – 6 October 1735) of Powderham Castle, Powderham, Devon, was an English landowner, a leading member of the Devonshire gentry and Tory politician who sat in the English House of Commons from 1701 to 1707 and in the British House of Commons almost continually from 1707 to 1735.

== Early life ==
Courtenay was the son of Colonel Francis Courtenay, MP for Devonshire from 1689 to 1699, and his wife Mary Boevey, daughter of William Boevey (died 1661), of Flaxley Abbey, Gloucestershire. The Boevey family was of Netherlandish Huguenot descent. Mary's brother was John Boevey (died 1706) who refers to himself in his will dated 6 March 1703 as "John Boevey of Powderham Castle". Courtenay's father died in 1699, predeceasing his own father Sir William Courtenay, 1st Baronet. Courtenay succeeded his grandfather in 1702 to the baronetcy and the estate of Powderham Castle. He married Lady Anne Bertie, daughter of James Bertie, 1st Earl of Abingdon on 13 July 1704.

== Career ==
Courtenay first stood for Parliament at Honiton at the first general election of 1701. He was defeated, but was then returned unopposed for Devonshire at the second general election of 1701. He was returned again unopposed in the general elections of 1702, 1705, and 1708. He was a moderate Tory, but opposed the impeachment of Dr. Sacheverell in 1710. He stood down at the 1710 general election in favour of Sir William Pole, but when Pole had to submit to re-election on appointment to office, Courtenay was pressured by popular demand to stand again. He defeated Pole by a massive majority at the by-election on 22 July 1712. He was returned unopposed at the 1713 general election. From 1714 to 1716 he served as Lord Lieutenant of Devon. He was returned as a Tory at the 1715 general election and was returned unopposed again at the succeeding general elections in 1722, 1727 and 1734.

== Death and legacy ==
Courtenay died on 6 October 1735. He directed his body to be buried in the north aisle of Powderham Church "near the monument there erected". He further desired "my executor (who was his nephew William Courtenay (died 1735) of Powderham)...to bestow and lay out the summe of fifty pounds in erecting a monument near the place of interment in such manner as my executor shall think fit". No such monument survives. His children included:

- William Courtenay, 1st Viscount Courtenay
- Henry Reginald Courtenay, MP.
- Eleanor Courtenay (died 1765) who married John Francis Basset (1714–1757) MP for Barnstaple in 1740–1741, of Heanton Court, Heanton Punchardon.

There is a fuller list of his children in the Powderham parish registers available through FindMyPast. (Mary born 1705, William 1706, James 1707, Anna Sophia 1708, William 1709, Eleanora 1710, Bridget 1712, Henry Reginald 1714, Isabella 1716, Mary 1717, Elizabeth 1718, Peregrine 1720). Peregrine, Anna Sophia and Isabella (wife of John Andrew of Exeter) were mentioned in a deed dated 2 May 1765 and registered in Dublin.

He left £10 each to his nieces Elizabeth, Mary, Lucy and Isabella Courtenay for mourning clothes. He also bequeathed them each the sum of £30 to buy a diamond ring each, to be worn in his memory. He bequeathed to Sir William Courtenay his nephew the sum of £100 and also made him his residuary beneficiary.

In 1831 Courtenay was recognised as having been de jure 6th Earl of Devon.

Parliament of England
| Preceded by Thomas Drewe; Samuel Rolle | Member of Parliament for Devon; Jan. 1701 – 1707; With: Samuel Rolle 1701; Sir John Pole 1701–02; Robert Rolle 1702–1707 | Succeeded by Parliament of Great Britain |
Parliament of Great Britain
| Preceded by Parliament of England | Member of Parliament for Devon; 1707–1710; With: Robert Rolle | Succeeded by Sir William Pole; John Rolle |
| Preceded by Sir William Pole; John Rolle | Member of Parliament for Devon; 1712–1735; With: John Rolle 1712–13, 1727–30; Sir Coplestone Bampfylde 1713–27; Henry Rolle 1730–35 | Succeeded by Henry Rolle; John Bampfylde |
| Preceded by Sir William Drake; James Sheppard | Member of Parliament for Honiton; 1715–1716; With: Sir William Yonge | Succeeded by Sir William Yonge; Sir William Pole |
Honorary titles
| Preceded by The Earl Poulett | Lord Lieutenant of Devon; 1714–1716 | Succeeded by The Lord Carteret |
Peerage of England
| Preceded by William Courtenay | Earl of Devon de jure 1702–1735 | Succeeded by William Courtenay |
Baronetage of England
| Preceded by William Courtenay | Baronet (of Powderham); 1702–1735 | Succeeded by William Courtenay |
