= Sir Coplestone Bampfylde, 3rd Baronet =

British landowner and High Tory politician

Arms of Bampfylde: Or, on a bend gules three mullets argent

Sir Coplestone Warwick Bampfylde, 3rd Baronet (c. 1689 – 7 October 1727) of Poltimore and North Molton, Devon, was a British landowner and High Tory politician who sat in the House of Commons from 1710 to 1727.

== Origins ==
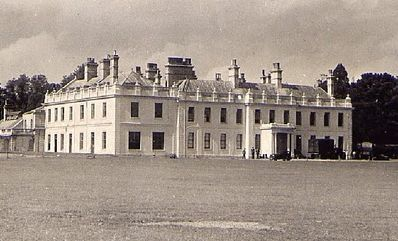
Poltimore House, seat of the Bampfylde family

Bampfylde was the eldest son of Colonel Hugh Bampfylde (c. 1663–1691) (son and heir apparent of Sir Coplestone Bampfylde, 2nd Baronet (c. 1633–1692), whom he predeceased) and his wife Mary Clifford, daughter of James Clifford of Ware. He matriculated at Christ Church, Oxford on 26 January 1708, aged 18. His father died in a fall from his horse in 1691 and in 1692 he succeeded his grandfather Sir Coplestone Bampfylde, 2nd Baronet (c. 1633–1692) as 3rd baronet. His mother protected him in his infancy against lawsuits challenging his property rights.

== Career ==
At the 1710 general election, Bampfylde was returned unopposed as MP for Exeter. He was then returned unopposed as MP for Devon at the 1713 general election. He was returned unopposed again at the 1715 general election and voted against the Government in all divisions. During The Fifteen, he was suspected of Jacobite sympathies and was temporarily imprisoned. He was also mentioned in the seventh report of the South Sea Company inquiry as having accepted £1,000 stock in the company on 22 March 1720 without paying for it. At the 1722 general election he was again returned unopposed for Devon and sat until his death in 1727.

== Inheritance ==
As well as having inherited his grandfather's extensive Devonshire estates, including Poltimore and North Molton, Bampfylde also inherited the estates of his distant cousin Warwick Bampfylde (1623–1695) of Hardington, Somerset (5th in descent from Peter Bampfylde of Hardington, younger brother of Sir William I Bampfylde (died 1474) of Poltimore), to whom he acted as executor.

== Marriage and children ==
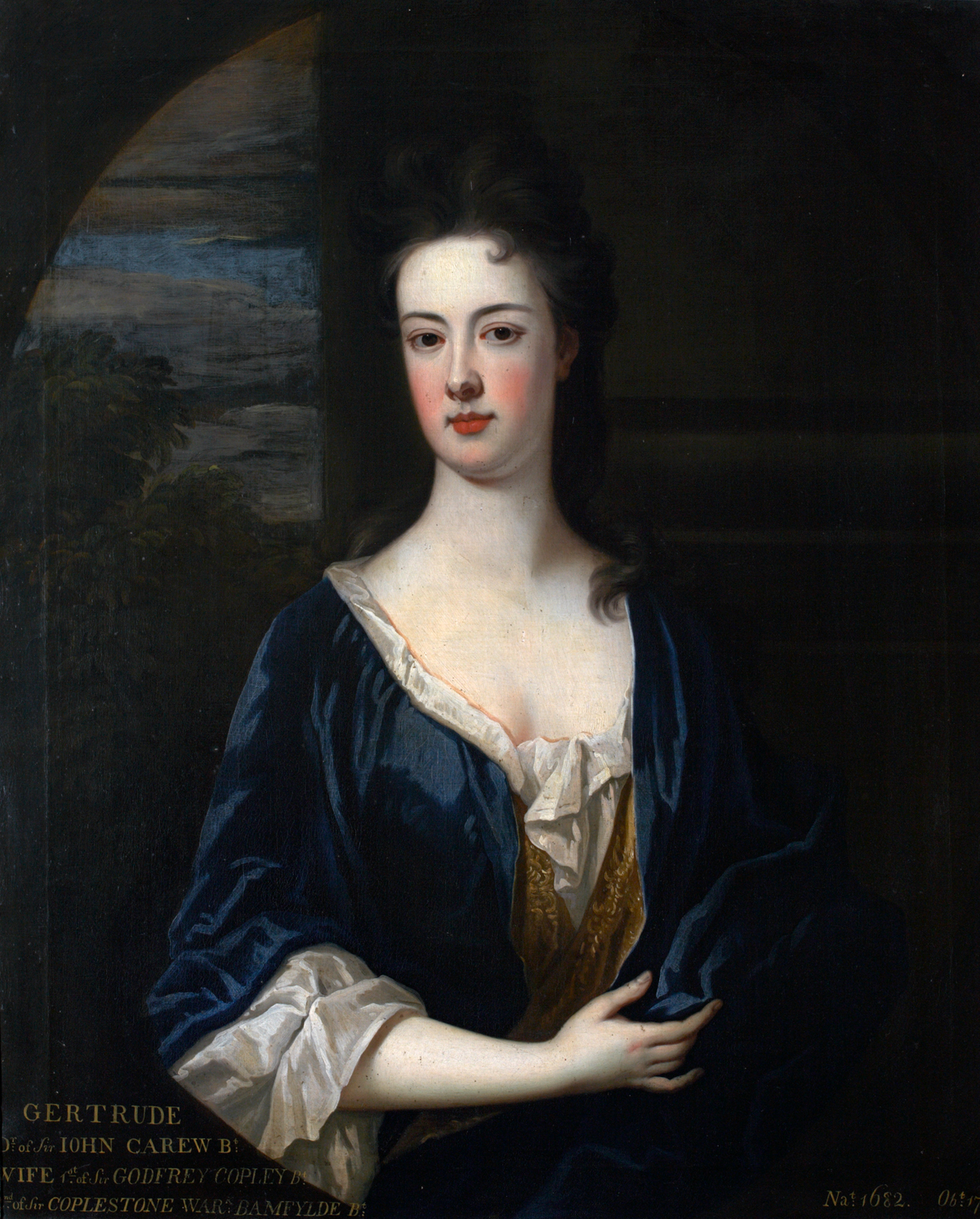
Gertrude Carew (1682–1736), a daughter of Sir John Carew, 3rd Baronet (1635–1692) of Antony, wife of Sir Coplestone Bampfylde, 3rd Baronet. Portrait by Charles d' Agar, National Trust, collection of Antony House

In June 1716 Bampfylde married Gertrude Carew, daughter of Sir John Carew, 3rd Baronet (died 1692) of Antony, Cornwall. They had two daughters and a son and heir Sir Richard Warwick Bampfylde, 4th Baronet (1722–1767).

== Death and succession ==
Bampfylde died on 7 October 1727 and was buried at Poltimore a week later. He was succeeded in the baronetcy by his son Sir Richard Bampfylde, 4th Baronet (1722–1767).

Parliament of Great Britain
Preceded by Nicholas Wood; John Harris	Member of Parliament for Exeter; 1710–1713; With: John Snell	Succeeded by John Rolle; Francis Drewe
Preceded by Sir William Courtenay, Bt; John Rolle	Member of Parliament for Devon; 1713–1727; With: Sir William Courtenay, Bt	Succeeded by Sir William Courtenay, Bt; John Rolle
Baronetage of England
Preceded by Coplestone Bampfylde	Baronet (of Poltimore); 1692–1727	Succeeded by Richard Bampfylde
