= Baron Rolle =

Barony in the Peerage of Great Britain

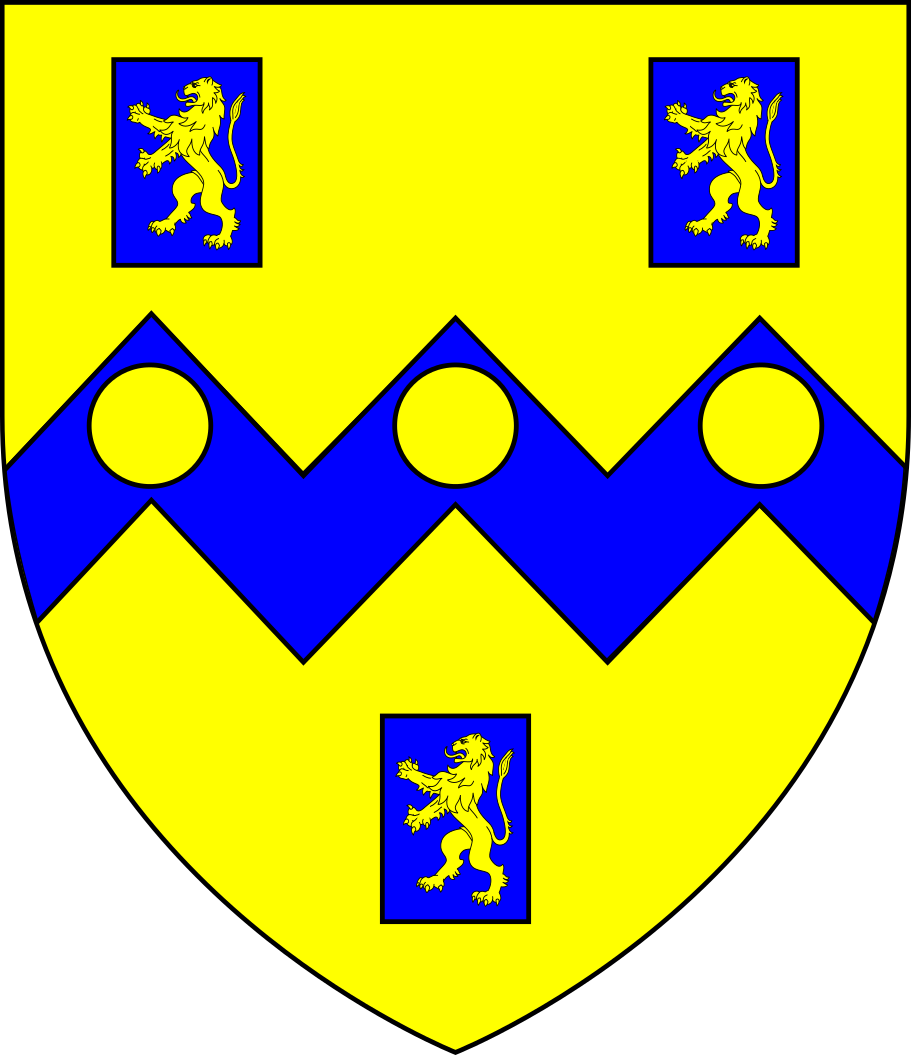
The Rolle title's coat of arms

Baron Rolle was a title created twice in the Peerage of Great Britain for members of the Rolle family, related as uncle and nephew.

== History ==
This family was established at the manor of Stevenstone in Devon in the 16th century. In the 17th century they acquired additional estates in Devon including Bicton when Sir Henry Rolle (died 1617) married Anne Denys, a co-heiress of Bicton and Holcombe Burnell. On 8 January 1747/8 Henry Rolle (1708–1750, previously Member of Parliament for Devon and Barnstaple, was made Lord Rolle, Baron of Stevenstone, in the County of Devon. The title became extinct on his early death in 1750.

His nephew John Rolle (1756–1842) inherited the family estates in 1779 and on 20 June 1796 was made Baron Rolle, of Stevenstone in the County of Devon. The title became extinct on his death in 1842. He bequeathed his estates, then some 55,000 acres (220 km^{2}), to Hon. Mark Trefusis (died 1907), second son of the 19th Baron Clinton, the nephew of his second wife and widow, who was required by the will to adopt the surname and arms of Rolle, which he did by royal licence in 1852. In 1907 he too died leaving no sons when, in accordance with the entail created by the will of Lord Rolle, the Rolle estates descended to his nephew Charles Trefusis, 21st Baron Clinton (1863–1957) of Heanton Satchville, Huish.

== Arms ==
The coat of arms of the Lords Rolle is blazoned Or, on a fesse dancetté between three billets azure each charged with a lion rampant of the first three bezants.
