= Sir William Courtenay, 1st Baronet =

English politician (1628-1702)

- Arms of Courtenay of Powderham: Or, three torteaux a label azure

Member of Parliament for Devon
- In office 1679-1685

High Sheriff of Devon
- In office 1664

Member of Parliament for Ashburton
- In office 1660

Personal details
- Born: 7 September 1628
- Died: 1 August 1702 (aged 73)
- Spouse: Margaret Waller
- Children: 8, including Francis
- Parent: Francis Courtenay (father)
- Relatives: Edward Seymour (grandfather); William Courtenay (grandson)

Sir William Courtenay, 1st Baronet (7 September 1628 – 1 August 1702) was an English politician.

== Origins ==
Courtenay was the eldest son and heir of Francis Courtenay (d. 1638) of Powderham Castle by his second wife Elizabeth Seymour, daughter of Sir Edward Seymour, 2nd Baronet.

== Career ==
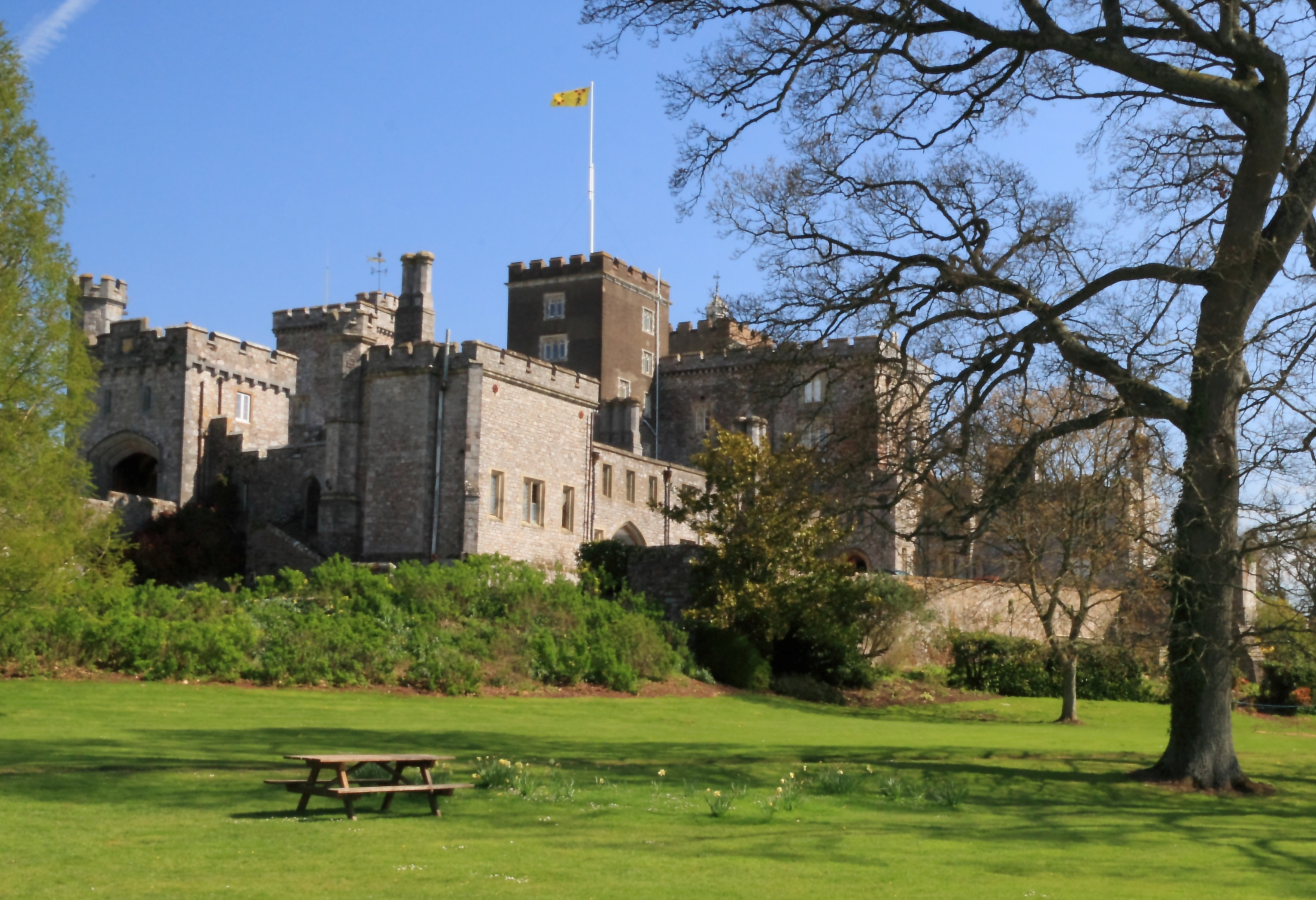
Powderham Castle

He was created a baronet in 1644 by King Charles I but disdained the newly invented variety of title, perhaps on political grounds, and never took out a patent. He was therefore not included in the list of baronets, although the king styled him as such in his commissions.

On 2 April 1660, Courtenay became the Member of Parliament (MP) for Ashburton, Devon. However, he retired from politics after the Restoration and appears not to have been returned in 1661. In 1664 he served as High Sheriff of Devon. In 1677 Courtenay's health prevented him from standing for Ashburton but he managed the campaign of the country party. The country party's candidate was unsuccessful, but the government supporters admitted that in a clean election Courtenay's campaign had been very moderate. Notwithstanding that, he had made a new freeholder and "drank him so freely" that he fell downstairs and broke his neck. On 18 February 1679, Courtenay became MP for Devon until 1685. His health prevented him from standing in 1688.

After the Glorious Revolution of 1688, Courtenay funded a lavish reception at Forde House, Wolborough, for William of Orange and his council, who had just landed nearby at Torbay. He was not himself present as host, having felt it prudent not to associate himself too strongly with the new regime should it fail. The chair on which the future King William III sat during his first Council of State at Forde is now displayed in the Dining Hall of Powderham Castle.

== Marriage and children ==
Courtenay married Margaret Waller (d. 1694), daughter of Sir William Waller, a parliamentary general in the Civil War, and eventual heiress of her maternal grandfather Sir Richard Reynell (d. 1633) of Forde, Wolborough, Devon, where he had built a new mansion in about 1610. Forde became the couple's main home, possibly due to the damage suffered by Powderham Castle during the Civil War, it having been captured on 25 January 1646 from the Royalist garrison by the parliamentarian forces under Col. Robert Hammond. Certainly, Sir William and his wife were buried at Wolborough and several of their children were baptised there. They had eight children:

- Col. Francis Courtenay (1651–1699), eldest son, who predeceased his father. He married in 1670 Mary Boevey, daughter of William Boevey (d. 1661), a merchant of Dutch ancestry, of Flaxley Abbey, Gloucestershire, brother of the merchant, lawyer, philosopher and pioneering developer of Exmoor, James Boevey (1622–1696). His eldest son and thus heir to his grandfather was Sir William Courtenay, 2nd Baronet (1675–1735) de jure 6th Earl of Devon.
- James Courtenay (1655–1727), of Walreddon, Witchurch, Devon. He married Elizabeth Bourbon in 1682.
- George Courtenay (born 1657), MP of Fitzford, Devon.
- Richard Courtenay (died 1696), married Katherine Waller.
- William Courtenay (died 1703), MP for Devon. Married Susanna Kellond. (if this refers to the Susanna Kellond b. c. 1677 daughter of John Kellond married to Bridget Fownes, da. John Fownes, she married William Courtenay, (M.P. for Mitchell 1701) son of Humphrey Courtenay married to Alice Courtenay da. of Peter Courtenay married to Alice Rashleigh.
- Elizabeth Courtenay, married John Clobery in 1673.
- Margaret Courtenay (1663–1755), married Edmund Reynell.
- Jane Courtenay (born 1664), married John Rowe in 1687.

== Death and burial ==
Courtenay died aged 73 and was buried at Wolborough, the parish church of Forde House.

== Succession ==
He was succeeded by his grandson Sir William Courtenay, 2nd Baronet (1675–1735) de jure 6th Earl of Devon.

Peerage of England
Preceded by Francis Courtenay	Earl of Devon de jure 1638–1702	Succeeded by William Courtenay
Baronetage of England
New title	Baronet; 1644–1702	Succeeded by William Courtenay
