= Sir William Walter, 1st Baronet =

English lawyer and politician

Sir William Walter, 1st Baronet (c. 1604 – 23 March 1675) was an English lawyer and politician who sat in the House of Commons from 1628 to 1629.

Walter was the son of Sir John Walter, of Wolvercote, Oxfordshire, Lord Chief Baron of the Exchequer (1625–1630), and his first wife, Margaret Offlet, daughter of William Offlet, of London. He matriculated at Christ Church, Oxford on 16 March 1621, aged 17. He studied law at the Inner Temple and was called to the bar in 1630 He succeeded his father on 18 November 1630 and was appointed Sheriff of Oxfordshire for 1636.

In 1628, he was elected member of parliament for Weobley and sat until 1629 when King Charles decided to rule without parliament for eleven years.

Walter was created baronet of Sarsden on 20 November 1641. He was created Doctor of Civil Law of Oxford on 2 November 1642. He compounded and was fined £1,430 in August 1646. In April 1663 he was elected MP for Oxfordshire but the election was declared void.

Walter died intestate at the age of about 70 and was buried at Sarsden on 27 March 1675. He had married by licence dated 20 December 1632 Elizabeth Lucas, daughter of Thomas Lucas of St. John's Abbey, Colchester, who was buried at Sarsden on 12 May 1691. They had at least two sons and two daughters.

Parliament of England
Re-enfranchised in 1628	Member of Parliament for Weobley; 1628–1629; With: William Tomkins	Parliament suspended until 1640
Baronetage of England
New creation	Baronet (of Saresden); 1641–1675	Succeeded by William Walter
