= Francis Courtenay (died 1699) =

English Member of Parliament

Member of Parliament for Devonshire
- In office 1689-1699

Personal details
- Born: c. 1650
- Died: 12 May 1699 (aged 48–49)
- Children: William Courtenay
- Parent: William Courtenay (father)

Francis Courtenay (c. 1650 – 12 May 1699) was an English Member of Parliament.

He represented Devonshire in the House of Commons from 1689 to 1699. He was the son of Sir William Courtenay, 1st Baronet and the father of Sir William Courtenay, 2nd Baronet.
