= Joe Waters (musician) =

American country music singer-songwriter (1947–2008)

Background information
- Birth name: William Joseph Waters
- Born: September 19, 1947
- Origin: Chillicothe, Ohio, U.S.
- Died: February 18, 2008 (aged 60)
- Genres: Country
- Occupation: Singer
- Instrument(s): Vocals, guitar
- Years active: 1968–1984
- Labels: New Colony Records

William Joseph Waters (September 19, 1947 – February 18, 2008) was an American country music singer. He released at least five singles that charted on the U.S. Billboard Hot Country Singles chart. He released one album, Harvest Moon in 1983.

== Discography ==
=== Studio albums ===
Title	Details	Peak chart positions
Title	Details	US Country
Harvest Moon	Release date: April 4, 1983; Label: New Colony Records; Formats: Vinyl	42

=== Singles ===
Year	Single	Peak positions	Album
Year	Single	US Country	Album
1981	"Livin' in the Light of Her Love"	85	Single only
1981	"Some Day My Ship's Comin' In"	47	Harvest Moon
1982	"The Queen of Hearts Loves You"	75	Harvest Moon
1983	"Harvest Moon"	74	Harvest Moon
1984	"Rise Above It All"	90	Harvest Moon
