= John Snell (died 1717) =

John Snell (1638–1717) was a member of the British House of Commons representing Exeter from 1702 to 1708.

Snell was the son of Rev. John Snell of Thurlestone Devon and was born about 1638. His father as a Royalist had been dispossessed of his living during the Commonwealth. He was made Freeman of Exeter in 1674, and sheriff from 1681 to 1682. He was nominated an alderman when King Charles II of England presented a new charter to the city in 1684. Snell was twice more Mayor – 1689 to 1690 and 1700 to 1701. Foster describes him as "An alderman of the city of Exeter what he hath to do as well to his own honour as that of the city, several times represented in parliament "

He remained MP for Exeter from 1702 to 1708.

Snell married Anne Wakerell of Chawleigh, Devon on 25 July 1656 at Saint Peter Cathedral. They had a son and 3 daughters.

== Bibliography ==
- History of Parliament: The Commons 1691–1714
- Foster Calumny revisited
