= Walter baronets =

Extinct baronetcy in the Baronetage of England

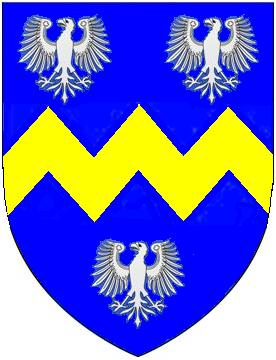
- Escutcheon of the Walter baronets of Saresden
- Creation date: 1641
- Status: extinct
- Extinction date: 1731
- Arms: Azure, a fesse indented or between three eagles displayed argent

The Walter Baronetcy, of Saresden in the County of Oxford, was a title in the Baronetage of England. It was created on 16 August 1641 for William Walter, previously Member of Parliament for Weobly. The third Baronet sat as member of parliament for Appleby and Oxford. The title became extinct on the death of the fourth Baronet in 1731.

== Walter baronets, of Saresden (1641) ==
- Sir William Walter, 1st Baronet (c. 1604–1675)
- Sir William Walter, 2nd Baronet (c. 1635–1694)
- Sir John Walter, 3rd Baronet (c. 1674–1722)
- Sir Robert Walter, 4th Baronet (1680–1731)
