= Bampfylde =

Bampfylde is an English surname, and may refer to:

- Amyas Bampfylde (1560–1626), English nobleman
- Augustus Bampfylde, 2nd Baron Poltimore (1837–1908), English nobleman
- Sir Charles Bampfylde, 5th Baronet (1753–1823), English nobleman
- Sir Coplestone Bampfylde, 2nd Baronet (1633–1692), English nobleman
- Sir Coplestone Bampfylde, 3rd Baronet (1689–1727), English nobleman
- Coplestone Warre Bampfylde (1720–1791), British landowner, garden designer, and artist
- George Bampfylde, 1st Baron Poltimore (1786–1858), English nobleman
- John Codrington Bampfylde (1754–1796/1797), English poet
- John Bampfylde (1691–1750), English landowner and politician
- Sir John Bampfylde, 1st Baronet (1610–1650), English nobleman
- Sir Richard Bampfylde, 4th Baronet (1722–1776), English nobleman

== See also ==
- Bampfield
