= Kerswell Priory =

Former priory in Devon, England

Coordinates: 50.849253°N 3.316734°W

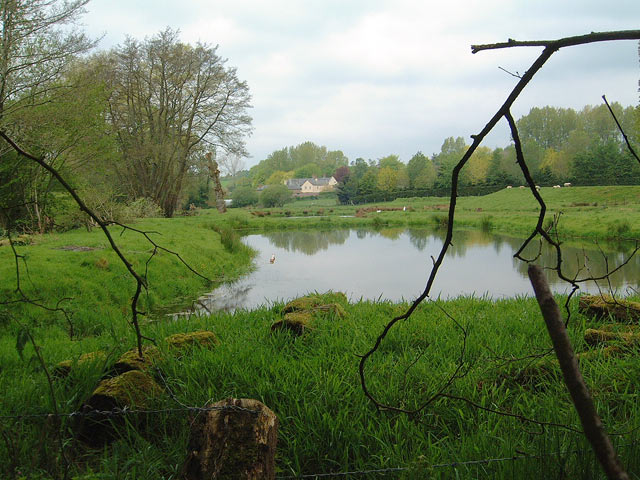
Kerswell Priory

Kerswell Priory (alias Carswell) was a small Cluniac priory in the parish of Broadhembury in Devon, England.

== History ==
According to the Ecclesiastical historian George Oliver (d.1861), the priory was founded between 1119 and 1129 as a cell of the Cluniac Montacute Priory in Somerset. However, according to the Devon historian Pole (d.1635), it was a cell belonging to the Augustinian Canonsleigh Abbey in the parish of Burlescombe, Devon.

According to John Parker, the land was given to the church by Matilda Peverel, the daughter of Pagan (or Payne) Peverel of Sampford Peverell in Devon, a knight who fought in the First Crusade.

The priory was valued at £2 1s 8d in the Taxatio Ecclesiastica of 1291–1292 when it held land in Kerswell, Monk Culm and Sampford Peverell(property which is now in the Parish of Holcombe Rogus). During the 14th and 15th centuries as an alien priory it was seized by the crown during a period of wars in Aquitaine but was restored to the monks in 1312. In 1374 it was recorded that prior did not actually live at Kerswell Priory.

=== Dissolution ===
By the 16th century only two monks remained at the Priory, according to Leland. In 1534 it was valued at 28l 16s 4d, when the prior was Thomas Chard. It was dissolved in 1538 or 1539 during the Dissolution of the Monasteries and was granted by King Henry VIII to John Etherydge, according to Dugdale (d.1686). According to Pole, it was later purchased, during the reign of Queen Elizabeth I (1558–1603), by William Rosewell (c. 1520–1566), the queen's Solicitor-General, and descended to his grandson Sir Henry Rosewell (son of William Rosewell, 1561–1593), who owned it at the time of Pole's writing.

=== Hill of Priory ===
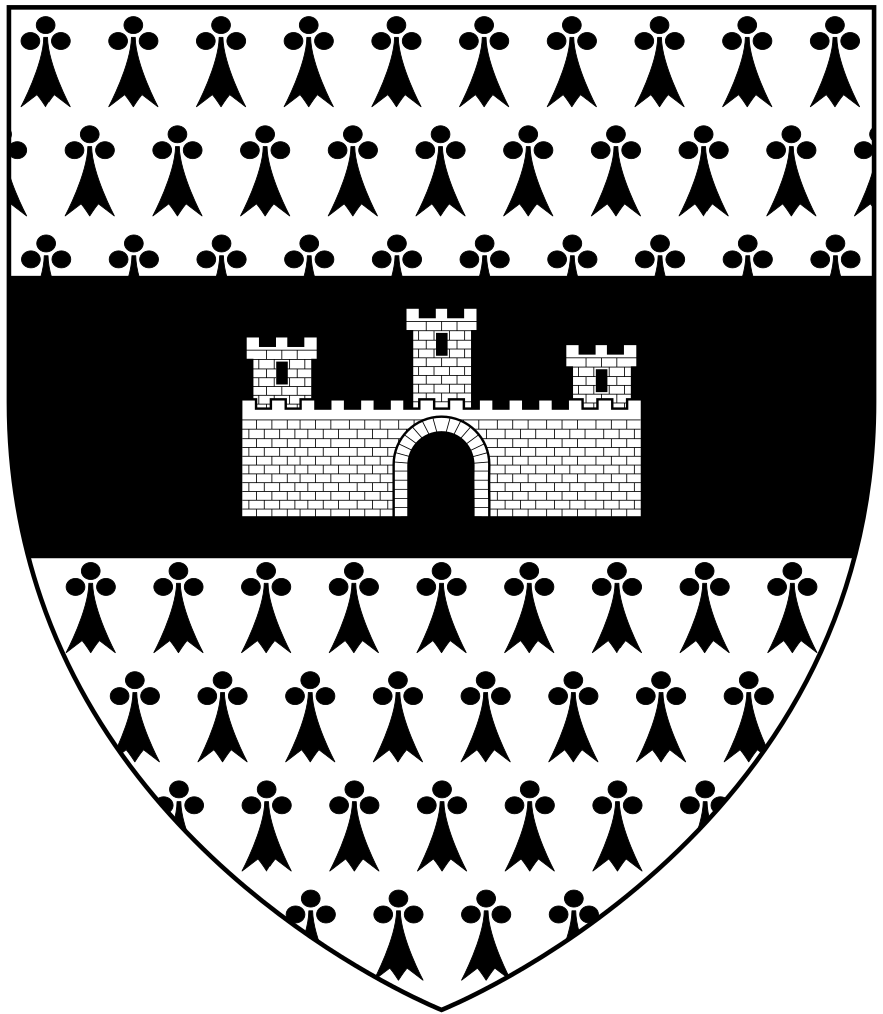
Arms of Hill of Hill's Court and of Priory: Ermine, on a fesse sable a castle triple towered argent

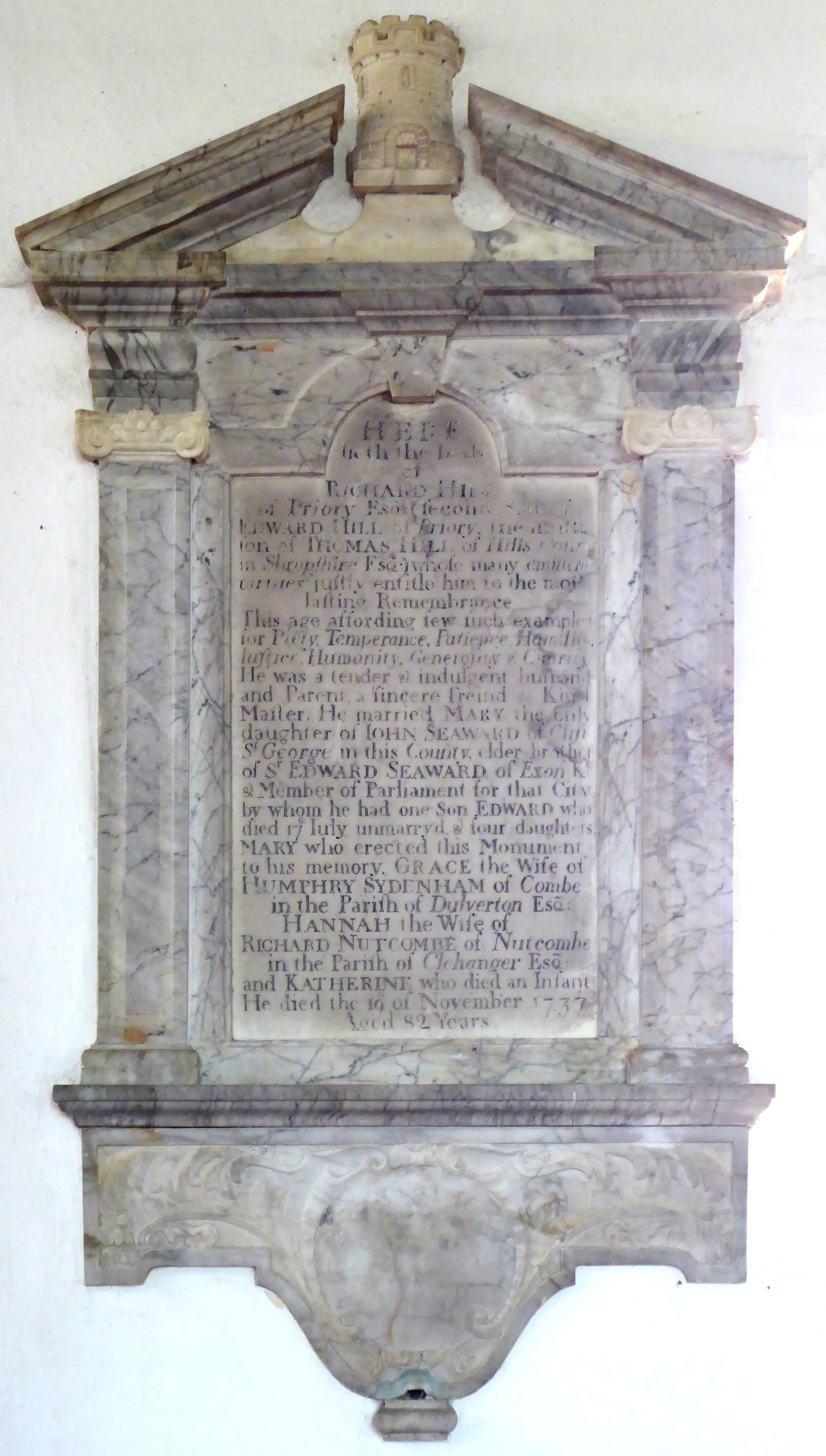
Mural monument in Broadhembury Church to Richard Hill (1655–1737) "of Priory"

In the early 17th century, when the estate was known as "Priory", it was acquired as his seat by Edward Hill, the ninth son of Thomas Hill of Hills Court (today "Court of Hill") in the parish of Nash in Shropshire, as is recorded on the mural monument in Broadhembury Church of his second son and heir Richard Hill (1655–1737), inscribed as follows:

Here lies the body of Richard Hill of Priory Esq. (second son of Edward Hill of Priory the ninth son of Thomas Hill of Hills Court in Shropshire Esq.) whose many imenent virtues justly entitled him to the most lasting remembrance. This age affording few such examples for Piety, Temperance, Humility, Justice, Humanity, Genoristy & Charity. He was a tender and diligent husband and Parent, a Sincere Friend and Kind Master. He married Mary the only daughter of John Seaward of Clist St George in this County, elder brother of Sr Edward Seaward of Exon Kt a Member of Parliament for that City, by whom he had one son Edward who died 17th July [sic, year omitted, lived (1700–1730)] unmarried and four daughters. Mary who erected this monument to his memory, Grace the wife of Humphrey Sydenham of Combe in the Parish of Dulverton Esq. Hannah the wife of Richard Nutcombe of Nutcombe in the Parish of Clehanger Esq. and Katherine who died an infant. He died 19th November 1737 Aged 82 Years

Above within the gap of the broken pediment is a castle, an element of the arms of Hill of Hill's Court, Shropshire: Ermine, on a fesse sable a castle triple towered argent. These arms are visible as an inescutcheon of pretence on the monument in Dulverton Church, Somerset, to Humphrey V Sydenham (1694–1757), "The Learned", of Combe, Dulverton, MP for Exeter 1741–1754, mentioned on the Broadhembury monument, who married Grace Hill, one of the two co-heiresses of that family.

=== Sydenham ===
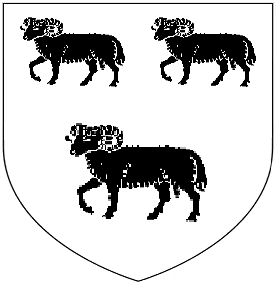
Arms of Sydenham: Argent, three rams passant guardant sable

==== Humphrey Sydenham (1694–1757) ====
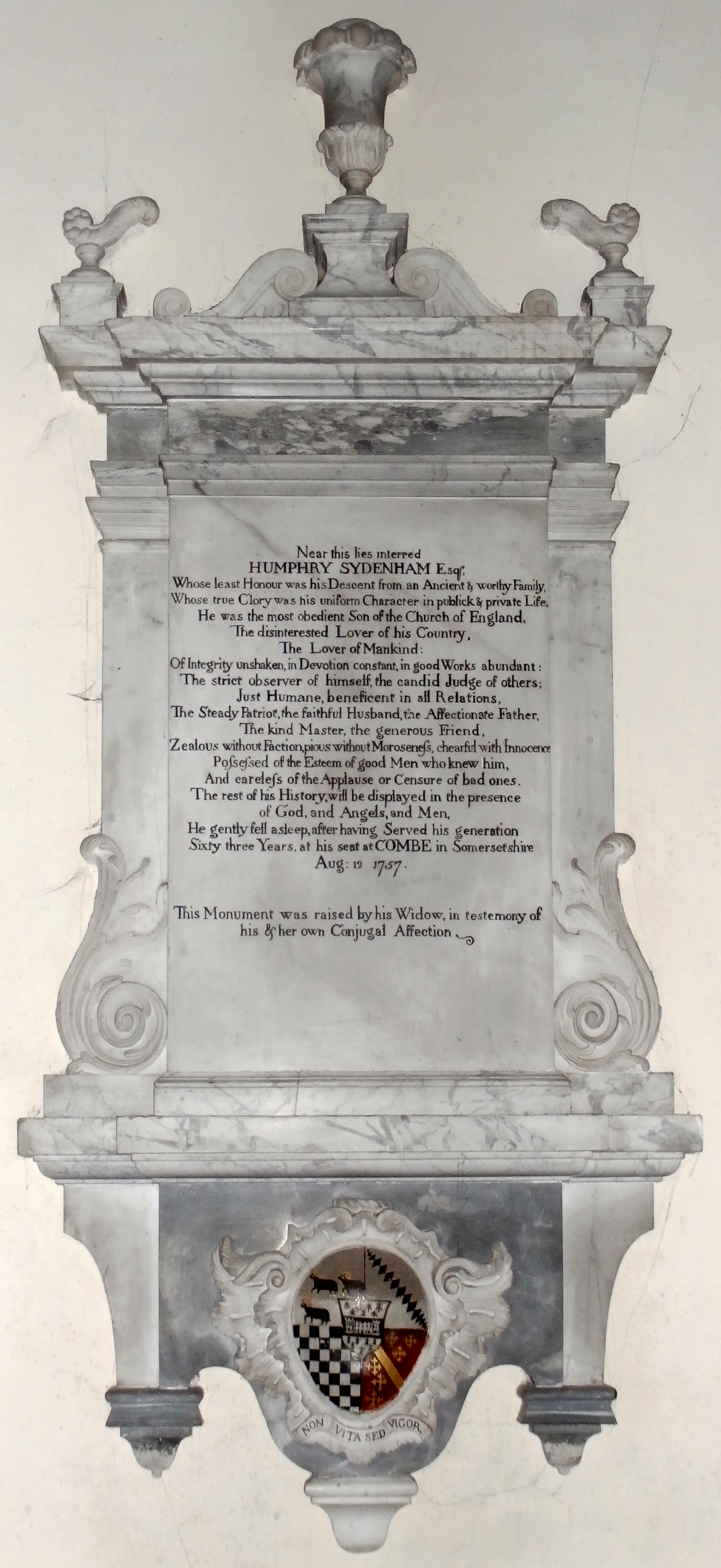
Mural monument in Dulverton Church to Humphrey Sydenham (1694–1757). The arms of Hill of Priory are shown on an inescutcheon of pretence below

Humphrey Sydenham (1694–1757), "The Learned", of Combe and Nutcombe, Devon, eldest son and heir of Humphrey Sydenham (1672–1710), was MP for Exeter 1741–1754. His mural monument survives in All Saints' Church, Dulverton. (Note: Moved from its original position when the church was rebuilt in the 19th century) He was a lawyer trained at the Inner Temple. He married Grace Hill, 2nd daughter and co-heiress of Richard Hill (1655–1737) of Kerswell Priory (who is mentioned on her father's mural monument in Broadhembury Church) (a junior branch of Hill of Hill's Court in Shropshire), by whom he had children 1 son and 3 daughters. He was ruined by the South Sea Bubble of 1720, in which he lost £20,000. His financial situation was restored by a large inheritance from his great-great-uncle Sir John St Barbe, 1st Baronet (died 1723), MP, of Broadlands in Hampshire. In the chancel of Ashington Church, Somerset, is a monument of grey and white marble, inscribed:

Here lies Sir John St. Barbe, Bart. possessed of those amiable qualities, which birth, education, travel, greatness of spirit, and goodness of heart, produce. Interred in the fame vault lies his second wife Alice Fiennes, aunt to the prefent Lord Say and Sele. His first was Honour, daughter of Colonel Norton. He died at his seat of Broadlands in Hampshire Sept. 7, 1723, leaving for his only heir and executor Humphrey Sydenham, esq., of Combe in Somersetshire, who ordered this marble to his memory.

In 1736 Humphrey Sydenham sold Broadlands to Henry Temple, 1st Viscount Palmerston. His own mural monument in Dulverton church is inscribed as follows:

Near this lies interred Humphry Sydenham Esqr., whose least honour was his descent from an ancient & worthy family, whose true glory was his uniform character in publick & private life. He was the most obedient son of the Church of England, the disinterested lover of his country, the lover of Mankind; of integrity unshaken, in devotion constant, in good works abundant; the stict observer of himself, the candid judge of others. Just, humane, beneficent in all relations, the steady patriot, the faithful husband, the affectionate father, the kind master, the generous friend; zealous without faction, pious without moroseness, chearful with innocence, possessed of the esteem of good men who knew him, and careless of the applause or censure of bad ones. The rest of his history will be displayed in the presence of God and angels and men. He gently fell asleep after having served his generation sixty-three years, at his seat at Combe in Somersetshire, Aug. 12 1757. This monument was raised by his widow in testemony of his & her own conjugal affection.

Underneath are displayed on an escutcheon quarterly of four: 1st: Argent, three rams passant guardant sable (Sydenham); 2nd: Argent, a bend of fusils sable (Kittisford); 3rd: Chequy argent and sable (St Barbe); 4th: Gules, a bend between six cross crosslets or (?). Overall is an inescutcheon of pretence: Ermine, on a fesse sable a castle with three towers argent (Hill). These are the arms of the Hill family (later Hill baronets, and Viscount Hill) seated at Hawkstone Hall in the parish of Hodnet, Shropshire, since its purchase in 1556 by Sir Rowland Hill, MP.

==== St. Barbe Sydenham (died 1799) ====
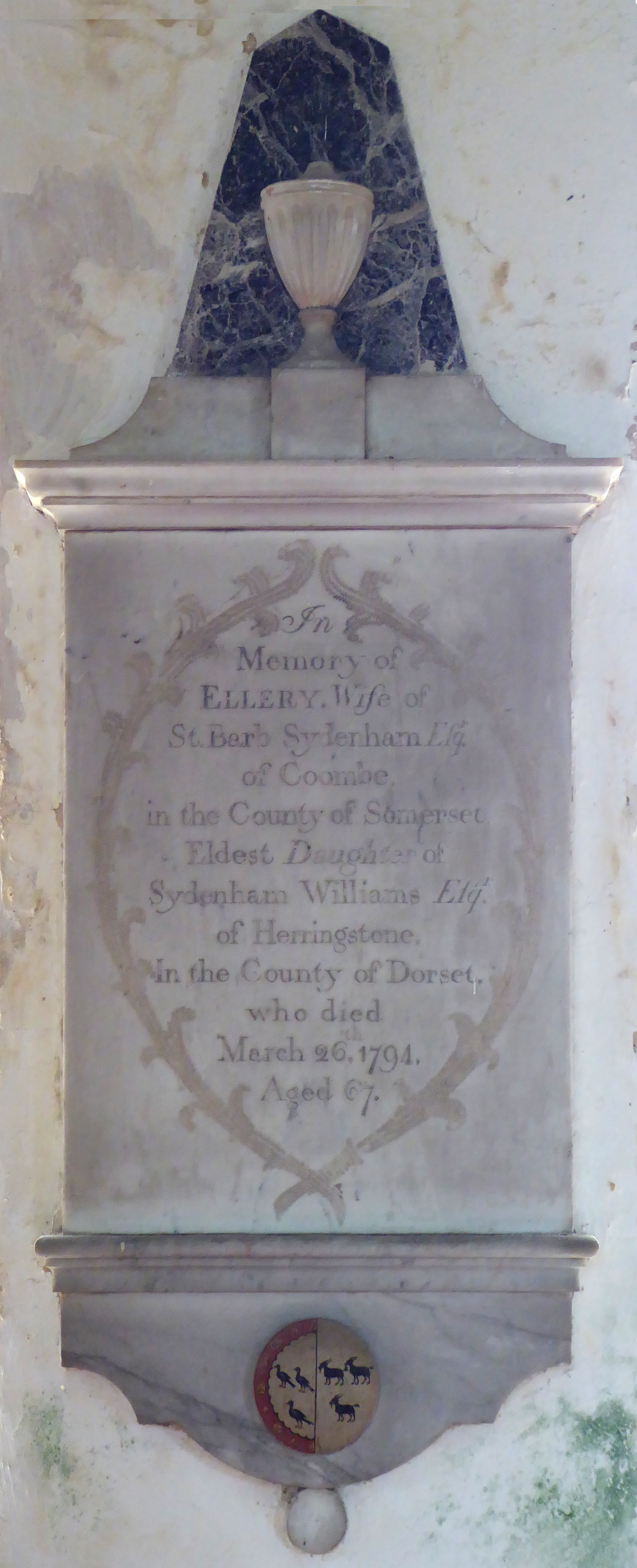
Mural monument in Broadhembury Church to Ellery Williams (1727–1794), wife of St. Barbe Sydenham

In the time of the Devon historian Polwhele (1760–1838), Priory was the seat of St Barbe Sydenham (died 1757), He was the only son of Humphrey Sydenham and was the possessor of Combe in 1791. He married his cousin Ellery Williams (1727–1794), eldest daughter of Sydenham Williams of Herringston House in the parish of Winterborne Herringston in Dorset, whose mural monument survives in Broadhembury Church, inscribed as follows:

In Memory of Ellery, Wife of St Barb Sydenham Esq of Coombe in the County of Somerset, eldest daughter of Sydenham Williams Esqr of Herringstone in the County of Dorset, who died March 26th 1794 aged 67.

Below are shown in a circular escutcheon the following arms: Argent, three Cornish choughs proper a bordure engrailed gules charged with crosses patée or and bezants alternately (Williams) impaling Sydenham, with the rams shown incorrectly as goats. The arms are thus shown incorrectly, as Sydenham should impale Williams. Sydenham Williams (1701–1757) was Governor of Portland Castle and was Sheriff of Dorset in 1740–1741 and was the son of John Williams (1680–1703) by his wife Jane Sydenham, a daughter of Humphrey Sydenham of Combe, Dulverton

St Barbe Sydenham died without male progeny, when Combe appears to have passed to his Sydenham cousin and heir male, apparently a descendant of his first cousin Floyer Sydenham (1710–1787), and left an only daughter Catherine Sydenham (died 1794), who in 1781 married Lewis-Dimoke Grosvenor Tregonwell of Anderson in Dorset, by whom she had a son St Barbe Tregonwell of Anderson. Combe passed to a cousin.

== The site today ==
Today a grade II* listed house occupies the probable site of the north, west and east ranges of the Priory. This house has a late 16th-century core with 17th- and 18th-century alterations and is rendered, probably over cob and stone, with a slate roof. The building includes a re-sited 12th-century stone doorway and is important both for its 17th- and 18th-century features and because of the archaeological interest of the site.

South of the house are the remains of the refectory, which had been rebuilt in the 19th and 20th centuries from a late 15th- or early 16th-century building. Although now a roofless ruin, it is a grade II listed building, mainly due its archaeological interest as part of the Priory complex. Originally it had a medieval wind-braced roof which was removed in 1984 and placed in storage.
