= Bampfield =

Bampfield is an English surname, and may refer to:

- Charles Bampfield Yule (1806–1878), Australian explorer and author
- Francis Bampfield (1615–1684), English Nonconformist preacher
- John Bampfield (1586–1657), English nobleman
- Joseph Bampfield (1622–1685), English soldier and spy
- Samuel Bampfield (1849–1899), American lawyer, newspaper editor, Christian minister, and state legislator
- Richard Bampfield (1526–1594), English nobleman
- Richard Bampfield (1898–1964), English first-class cricketer and an officer in the British Indian Army
- Thomas Bampfield (1623–1693), English lawyer

== See also ==
- Bampfylde
