= Humphrey Sydenham =

Humphrey Sydenham may refer to:

- Humphrey Sydenham (1694–1757), politician
- Humphrey Sydenham (1591–1650), royalist divine
