= John Tuckfield (MP) =

British politician

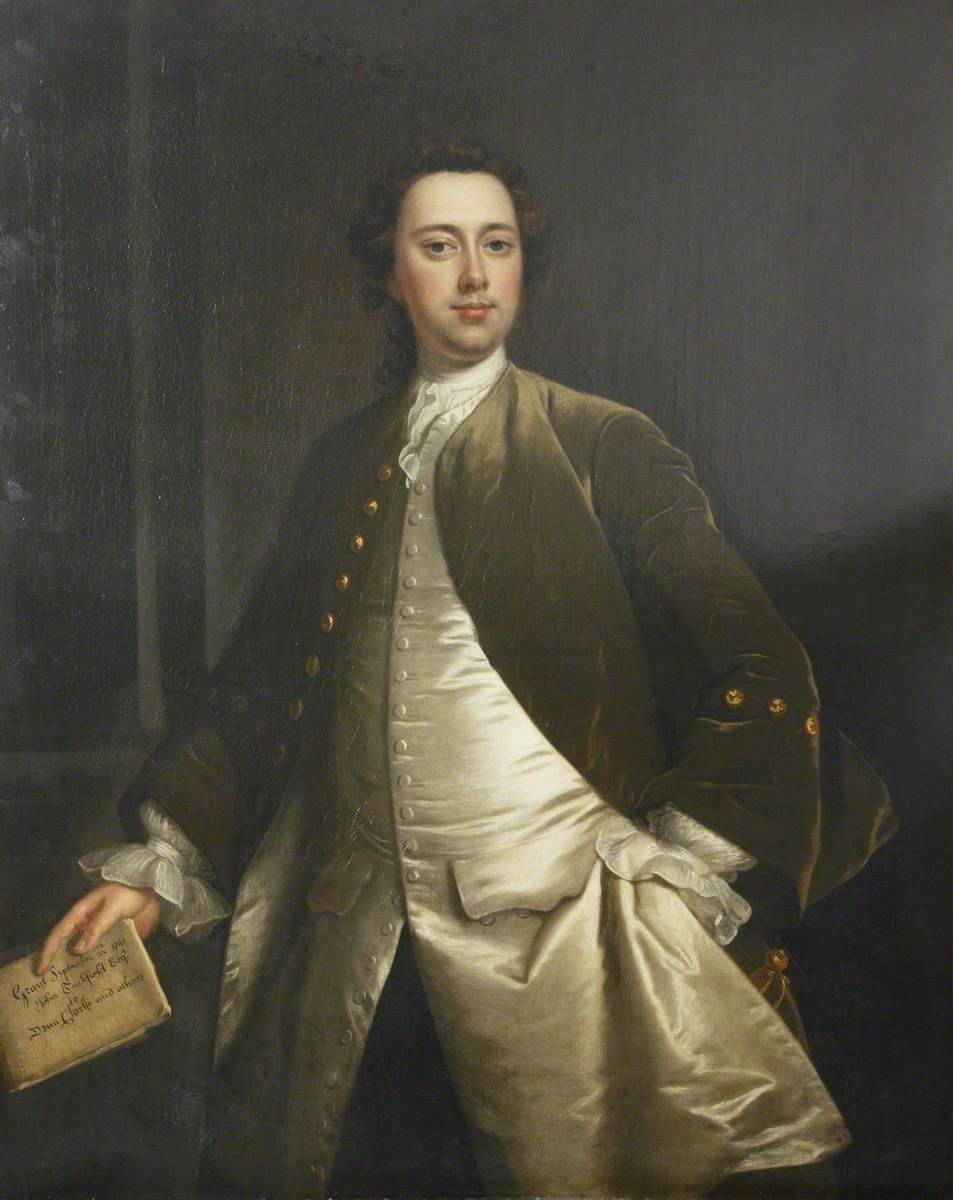
- painting by Thomas Hudson

Member of the Great Britain Parliament for Exeter
- In office 1747–1767 Serving with Humphrey Sydenham (Note: Served from 1747-1754); John Rolle Walter (Note: Served from 1754-1767)
- Preceded by: Sir Richard Bampfylde; Humphrey Sydenham
- Succeeded by: William Spicer; John Rolle Walter

Personal details
- Born: c. 1719
- Died: 6 December 1767

John Tuckfield (c. 1719 — 6 December 1767) was a British politician who was Member of Parliament for Exeter from 1747 to 1767.
