= John Bampfylde =

John Bampfylde may refer to:

- Sir John Bampfylde, 1st Baronet (c. 1610–1650), English MP for Penryn
- John Bampfylde (1691–1750), English MP for Devon and Exeter
- John Codrington Bampfylde (1754–1796), English poet
