= Floyer Sydenham =

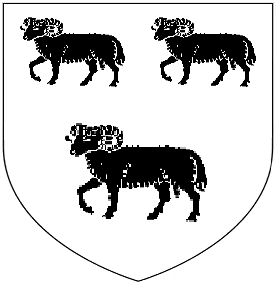
Arms of Sydenham: Argent, three rams passant guardant sable

Floyer Sydenham (1710 – 1 April 1787) was an English scholar of Ancient Greek.

== Origins ==
He was a younger son of Humphrey IV Sydenham (1672-1710) of Combe, Dulverton in Somerset, by his second wife and first cousin Katherine Floyer, daughter of William Floyer of Berne in Dorset, descended from the ancient family of Floyer of Floyer Hayes near Exeter. Humphrey IV Sydenham and his wife Katherine Floyer were both grandchildren of Sir William Pole (1614-1649), Knight, eldest son of Sir John Pole, 1st Baronet (d.1658) of Shute in Devon.

== Career ==
On 31 May 1727 at the age of 16 Sydenham matriculated at Wadham College, Oxford. In 1613 his great-grandfather Rev. Humphry II Sydenham (1591–1650), "Silver-Tongue Sydenham", of Combe, Dulverton, had become a Fellow of the newly founded Wadham College, founded posthumously by his fellow Somerset resident Nicholas II Wadham (1531–1609) and his wife. Humphry II Sydenham was the first to graduate as Master of Arts from that foundation on 3 December 1613.

Floyer Sydenham gained his B.A. at Wadham College in 1731 and M.A. in 1734. In 1735 he was a barrister-at-law in Lincoln's Inn. He was a Fellow and sometime Moderator of Philosophy at Wadham College, and was later Rector of Esher until 1744.

== Literary works ==
He translated some of the Dialogues of Plato into English, and wrote a dissertation on Heraclitus, which failed to win appreciation. He published Notes on Plato, edited the Greater and Lesser Hippias; also a Dissertation on the Doctrine of Heraclitus, and Onomasticon Theologicum. The translator Thomas Taylor wrote a widely published panegyric to Sydenham, and completed his work on the Dialogues.

== Death ==
He was so small a gainer in money by his works that he died in great poverty. He was imprisoned for a trifling debt, and died in prison on 1 April 1787. His sad fate is said to have led to the foundation of the Royal Literary Fund, due to "the sympathy aroused for poor authors by his death".
