= George Daniell (anaesthestist) =

- Born: 1864; Exeter, Devon, Great Britain
- Died: 16 January 1937 (aged 72–73); Port Elizabeth, Cape Province, South Africa

George Warwick Bampfylde Daniell (1864–1937) was medical practitioner and anaesthesiologist who practised in South Africa in the 19th and 20th centuries.

Daniell was the son of the Rev. George Daniell and the grandson of George Daniell, also a physician, and his wife Harriet, daughter of Richard Bampfylde. He received his medical training at St. George's Hospital, London, qualifying as a Member of the Royal College of Surgeons and a Licentiate of the Royal College of Physicians in 1888. The year following his graduation, he travelled to the Cape Colony, where he was licensed to practice on 8 June 1889. He began working as a general practitioner in Caledon. He practised there for most of the next eight years (though in 1893 he was listed as living in nearby Napier). Daniell took a special interest in the local warm baths. He was appointed medical superintendent of the Caledon Mineral Baths Sanatorium and medical officer of health to the Caledon Municipality. Daniell wrote a number of papers on the health benefits of the mineral waters there: He recommended both drinking and bathing in the hot mineral water, which he considered beneficial for anemia, rheumatism, gout, neuralgia, chronic diarrhoea, skin diseases, and many other complaints.

After the Anglo-Boer War (1899-1902) he returned to England to specialise in anaesthetics, working as an anaesthetist in several London hospitals to the middle of 1903 and then practising as an anaesthetist in Edinburgh until the end of 1904. During this time he was also an instructor in anaesthetics in London and Edinburgh. He used several agents in addition to ether and chloroform, such as ethyl chloride and a mixture of nitrous oxide and oxygen. Daniell developed and modified equipment to make the administration of the new agents safer and simpler.

Some of his early modifications of apparatus and original designs were displayed in the anaesthetics Museum of the British Medical Association in 1910. Parbhoo (1987, p. 714) described Daniell as "an insatiable gadgeteer".

In January 1906 he returned to South Africa and started to practise as an anaesthetist in Cape Town. The next year he became the first person to be appointed as a specialist anaesthetist to a South African hospital (the Johannesburg General Hospital). in 1908 he returned to Cape Town as a general practitioner while continuing to work in anaesthetics. Daniell advocated the use of ethyl chloride as a general anaesthetic for short operations.

In 1919 Daniell was appointed as a specialist anaesthetist at the Somerset Hospital, and two years later also as lecturer in anaesthetics at the Medical School of the University of Cape Town. He retired from Somerset Hospital in 1923. That year, and again in 1932, he visited Britain to attend meetings of the British Medical Association. He retired from the university in 1927 and settled in Grahamstown in about 1935. In his time he was regarded as the highest South African authority in anaesthesia.

== Publications ==
- "The mineral waters of Caledon". South African Medical Journal. 2: 242–246 and 309–314. 1895.
- The Climate and Mineral Waters of Caledon, South Africa. 1902.
- "Chloride of ethyl as a general anaesthetic". South African Medical Record. 1904.
- "On chloride of ethyl as a general anaesthetic in dental surgery". South African Medical Record. 1907.
- "Some observations in connection with general anaesthesia". Transvaal Medical Journal. 4. 1908.
- "Improved apparatus for the administration of warmed ether vapour". South African Medical Record. 1918.
- "General anaesthesia in ear, nose and throat operations". South African Medical Journal. 1932.
