= Richard Bampfylde =

British baron and politician (1722–1776)

Sir Richard Bampfylde

Member of the Great Britain Parliament for Exeter
- In office 1743–1747 Serving with Humphrey Sydenham
- Preceded by: Sir Henry Northcote; Humphrey Sydenham
- Succeeded by: John Tuckfield; Humphrey Sydenham

Member of the Great Britain Parliament for Devonshire
- In office 1747–1776 Serving with William Courtenay (Note: Served from 1747–1762); John Parker (Note: Served from 1762–1776)
- Preceded by: Sir Thomas Acland; William Courtenay
- Succeeded by: John Parker; John Walter

Personal details
- Born: 21 November 1722
- Died: 15 July 1776 (aged 53)
- Spouse: Jane Codrington (m. 1742)
- Children: 13, including Charles and John
- Parent: Coplestone Bampfylde (father)
- Relatives: John Carew (grandfather); Augustus Bampfylde (grandson)
- Education: New College, Oxford
- Military career
- Rank: Lieutenant-Colonel
- Unit: East Devon Militia

Arms of Bampfylde: Or, on a bend gules three mullets argent

Sir Richard Warwick Bampfylde, 4th Baronet (21 November 1722 – 15 July 1776) of Poltimore, North Molton, Warleigh, Tamerton Foliot and Copplestone in Devon and of Hardington in Somerset, England, was Member of Parliament for Exeter (1743–47) and for Devonshire (1747–76).

== Origins ==
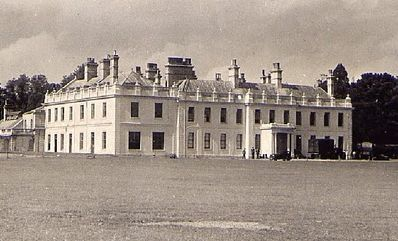
Poltimore House, seat of the Bampfylde family

He was the only son and heir of Sir Coplestone Bampfylde, 3rd Baronet of Poltimore, North Molton and Warleigh in Devon and of Hardington in Somerset, by his wife Gertrude Carew, daughter of Sir John Carew, 3rd Baronet, of Antony in Cornwall. He was baptised in Poltimore in Devon.

== Career ==
In 1727, aged only five, he succeeded his father as 4th baronet. He was educated at New College, Oxford and graduated as Master of Arts in 1741.

He was Member of Parliament for Exeter from 1743 to 1747 and subsequently for Devonshire from 1747 until his death in 1776. He was Lieutenant-Colonel of the East Devon Militia from its formation in 1758 until he resigned in 1771.

== Marriage and progeny ==
On 8 August 1742 in the chapel of Somerset House, London, he married Jane Codrington (d.1789), daughter and heiress of Colonel John Codrington of Charlton House, Wraxall, Somerset, by whom he had six sons and seven daughters including:

- Charles Warwick Bampfylde (1751–1751), eldest son who died an infant, buried at Poltimore.
- Sir Charles Bampfylde, 5th Baronet (1753–1823), MP, 2nd and eldest surviving son and heir.
- John Codrington Bampfylde (1754–1797), 3rd son, the poet.
- Amias Warwick Bampfylde (1757–1834), 4th son.
- Richard Warwick Bampfylde (1759–1834), 5th son, appointed by his father Rector of Poltimore also Rector of Black Torrington, Devon.
- Charlotte Bampfylde (born 1750), 5th daughter, wife of Abel Moysey (1743–1831) of Hinton Charterhouse, Somerset, MP for Bath (1774–1790).
- Harriet, who married George Daniell, a physician, and was grandmother to George Daniell (medical doctor)

== Landholdings ==
In 1741 his seats were Copplestone and Poltimore in Devon and Hardington in Somerset. His townhouse in Exeter was Bampfield House, demolished in World War II.

== Death, burial & succession ==
Bampfylde died on 15 July 1776 and was buried at Poltimore. He was succeeded in the baronetcy by his eldest surviving son Sir Charles Bampfylde, 5th Baronet (1753–1823).

Parliament of Great Britain
Preceded by Humphrey Sydenham; Sir Henry Northcote	Member of Parliament for Exeter; 1743–1747; With: Humphrey Sydenham	Succeeded by Humphrey Sydenham; John Tuckfield
Preceded by Sir Thomas Dyke-Acland, Bt; Sir William Courtenay, Bt	Member of Parliament for Devon; 1747–1776; With: Sir William Courtenay, Bt 1747–1762; John Parker 1762–1776	Succeeded by John Rolle Walter; John Parker
Baronetage of England
Preceded by Coplestone Bampfylde	Baronet (of Poltimore); 1727–1776	Succeeded by Charles Bampfylde
