= Combe, Dulverton =

Historic estate in Somerset, England

Coordinates: 51.0296°N 3.5515°W

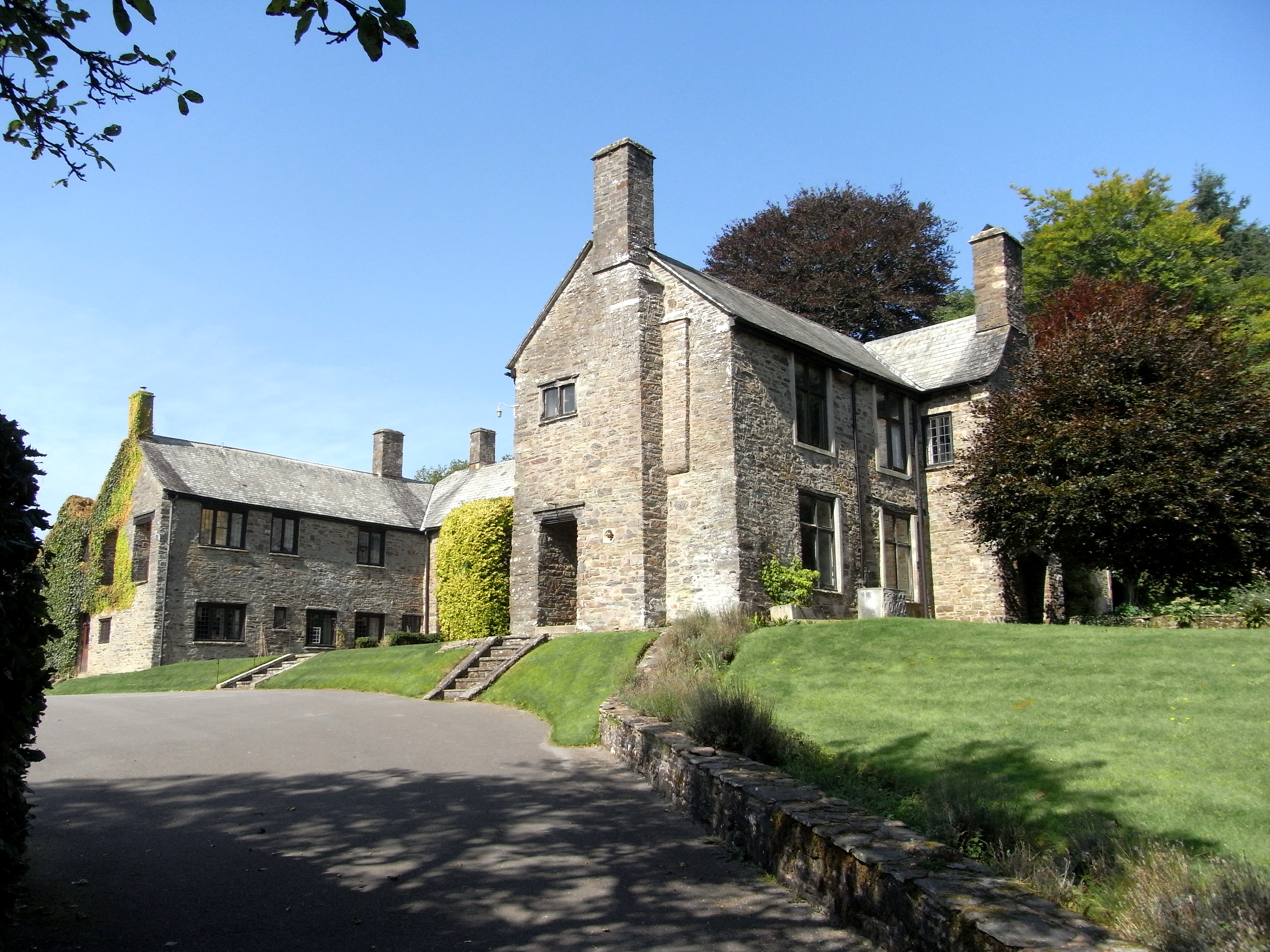
Combe House, Dulverton, viewed from south-east

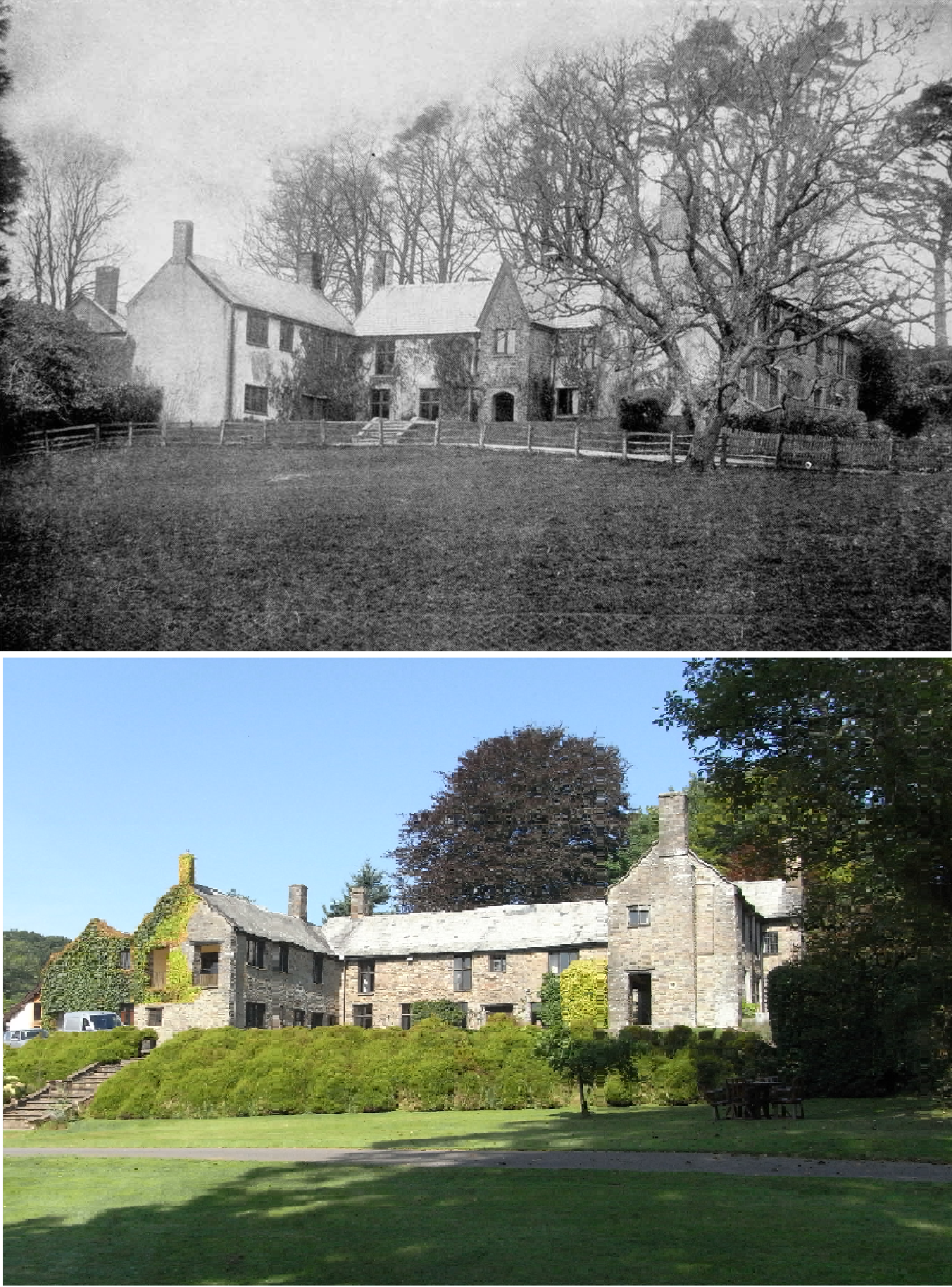
Combe House, contrasting views 1906 and 2015, showing entrance porch before removal and re-erection on east wing in 1926-7 as part of extensive alterations and enlargements by Col E J Harrison

Combe is a historic estate in Somerset, England, situated between the town of Dulverton and the village of Brushford.

== Descent ==
=== Taunton Priory ===
Until the Dissolution of the Monasteries under King Henry VIII, the estate was one of the possessions of Taunton Priory, which also held the manor of Dulverton.

==== Combe family ====
In the medieval period the Combe estate was probably held by the Combe family, although in 1254 the lord of Dulverton, Richard de Turberville, held land there. Alfred of Combe, the Bailiff of Dulverton in 1225, may have come from the estate – doubt arises because Combe, meaning steep-sided valley, is a common name in west Somerset. In 1425 John Combe was a free tenant of Taunton Priory, and Joan Combe, who has been assumed to be an heiress to the estate, married Edward Sydenham at some time before 1506, to whose Sydenham descendants Combe was home until 1874.

=== Sydenham ===
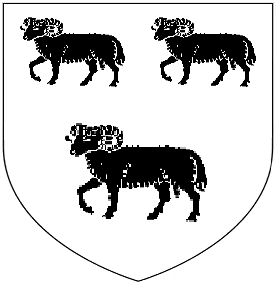
Arms of Sydenham: Argent, three rams passant guardant sable

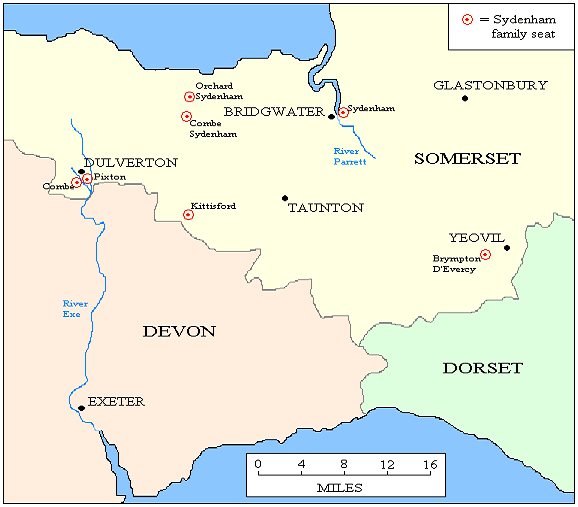
Map showing locations of historic seats of the Sydenham family of Somerset: Sydenham; Orchard Sydenham; Combe Sydenham; Brympton D'Evercy; Combe, Dulverton; Pixton

It was the seat of a junior branch of the de Sydenham (later Sydenham) family, which took its surname from the manor of Sydenham, near Bridgwater in Somerset. The family split into many prominent branches, the senior branch seated at Sydenham and Kittisford died out in the male line in the 15th century when Sydenham passed via the heiress to the Cave family, then to the Percival family, later Earl of Egmont. The next senior line was seated in the early 15th century at Combe Sydenham in the parish of Stogumber, Somerset, of which family was Simon Sydenham (died 1438), Bishop of Chichester, and which later inherited the Somerset manors of Orchard Sydenham (later called Orchard Wyndham) and Brympton d'Evercy, which latter remained the seat of the Sydenham baronets, which title was created in 1641. In 1871 Rev. Charles St. Barbe Sydenham (1823–1904), whose son was born at Combe in 1861, was declared bankrupt, which may have necessitated the sale of Combe. The descent of Combe in the Sydenham family was as follows:

==== Edward Sydenham (fl.1506) ====
Edward Sydenham, who at some time before 1506 married Joan de Combe, daughter and heiress of Walter de Combe of Combe. He was descended from John de Sydenham (eldest son of Roger de Sydenham (fl.1331) of Sydenham and Kittisford) who married Mary de Pixton, daughter and heiress of John de Pixton (alias Peekstone) of Pixton in the parish of Dulverton, situated across the River Barle from Combe. In 1506, together with John Doune of Exebridge, he obtained a lease of the manors of Brushford, Dulverton, Milverton, Halse and Stoke Pero and the advowson of Brushford with the next vacancy for £16 10s rent, from William Byrte, son and heir of William Byrte of Brushford.

==== John Sydenham (died 1561) ====
John Sydenham (died 1561), son, who married Elizabeth Frank, daughter and co-heiress of John Frank of Aller Butler, Somerset. The Victoria County History (Somerset, Volume 3) states that in 1549 he purchased Pixton from Henry Grey, Duke of Suffolk.

==== John Sydenham (died 1580) ====
John Sydenham (died 1580), son, who married twice, firstly to Elizabeth Pollard, daughter of Sir Hugh Pollard of King's Nympton in Devon, and secondly to Mary Ayshford, daughter of Nicholas Ayshford of Ayshford in the parish of Burlescombe in Devon. In 1566 William Babington sold the manor of Dulverton, "with its appertenances, and divers lands, tenements, and hereditaments, in Dulverton and other places", to John Sydenham.

==== Humphrey Sydenham (died 1625) ====
Humphrey Sydenham (died 1625) (son by his father's second wife) of Combe, was assessed at £40 in the 1581 subsidy, the highest level of any person in the locality and twice as much as Robert Courtenay of Molland. In 1582 he made a settlement:

"To make provision for his brother, sisters and any future wife, involving the manors of Dulverton, Brushford Sydenham, Chubworthie, Bathealton and Polleshill, all in Somerset, and of Heale, Nycolashayne and a moiety of East Anstey, all in Devon, and properties in Dulverton, Brushford, Brompton Regis, Bathealton, Milverton, Thorne St Margaret, Stawley, Raddington, Chipstable, Huish Champflower, Kittisford and Langford, all in Somerset, and Culmstock, East Anstey and Exeter, all in Devon".

He married firstly Jane Champneys, eldest daughter of John Champneys (1518–1569) of Uffculme, Devon, and widow of Martin Sandford of Harberton, Devon, whom she had married in 1569. Her brother William Champneys (1554–1629) of Yarnscombe, Devon, married as his first wife Margaret Sydenham, Humphry Sydenham's sister. He had at least three sons by his first wife: John Sydenham, his eldest son and heir, Roger Sydenham and Rev. Humphry Sydenham, "Silver-Tongue Sydenham", Rector of Puckington and Oldcombe, Somerset, heir to his elder brother John.

==== John Sydenham ====
John Sydenham (born 1590), eldest son and heir, who married Margery Poulet, daughter of Sir Anthony Poulett (1562–1600) (alias Paulet), of Hinton St George, Somerset, Governor of Jersey, and Captain of the Guard to Queen Elizabeth. Her brother was John Poulett, 1st Baron Poulett (1585–1649). In 1627 he paid feudal relief to George Luttrell (died 1629), feudal baron of Dunster for the manor of Bathealton held from the Barony of Dunster for a sixth of a knight's fee. In 1638 John Sydenham of Combe raised £2,000 for his son and daughters by way of mortgage on his manors including Combe and nearby Brushford and East Anstey. He died without male children, leaving only four daughters, whilst Combe passed to his younger brother Humphry, apparently under tail-male.

==== Rev. Humphrey Sydenham (1591–1650) ====
Rev. Humphry Sydenham (1591–1650), "Silver-Tongue Sydenham", Rector of Puckington and Oldcombe, Somerset, heir to his elder brother John Sydenham, who died without male children. In 1613 he became a Fellow of the newly founded Wadham College, Oxford, founded posthumously by his fellow Somerset resident Nicholas Wadham (1531–1609) and his wife. He was the first to graduate as Master of Arts from that foundation on 3 December 1613. He married Mary Cox, daughter of William Cox of Crewkerne, Somerset.

==== Humphrey Sydenham ====
Humphrey Sydenham (son), of Combe, who married Jane Pole, second daughter and eventual co-heiress of Sir William Pole, Knight (1614–1649), eldest son and heir apparent of Sir John Pole, 1st Baronet (died 1658) of Shute, Devon, by his second wife Katherine St Barbe, only daughter of Henry St Barbe of Broadlands, Hampshire. His sister-in-law Mary Pole married William Floyer of Berne, Dorset, descended from the ancient family of Floyer of Floyer Hayes near Exeter, whose daughter Katherine Floyer (fl.1695) married her first cousin Humphry Sydenham of Combe. He had three sons:

  - William Sydenham, eldest son and heir apparent, who predeceased his father and was unmarried.
  - Humphrey Sydenham (1672–1710), of Combe, eldest surviving son and heir.
  - John Sydenham "of Dulverton", younger son, who appears to have been the father of Rev. John Sydenham (1720–1788), who matriculated at Balliol College, Oxford in 1743 and later became vicar of Kidlington, Oxfordshire, in which office he died in 1788. Rev. John Sydenham (1720–1788) married Anne Pudsey, daughter and heiress of William Pudsey (died 1729) of Hampden, Kidlington, Oxfordshire and lived at Hampden House. His son Rev. John Pudsey Sydenham (1748–1810) matriculated at Trinity College, Oxford in 1766 and was vicar of Kidlington in 1788 and later rector of Ratley, Warwickshire, and was succeeded by his son John Pudsey Welchman Sydenham who was succeeded in 1854 by his sister Amy Sydenham, wife of Richard Burgoyne. Several Sydenhams of Hampden are buried in the Sydenham aisle of Kidlington Church.

==== Humphrey Sydenham (1672–1710) ====
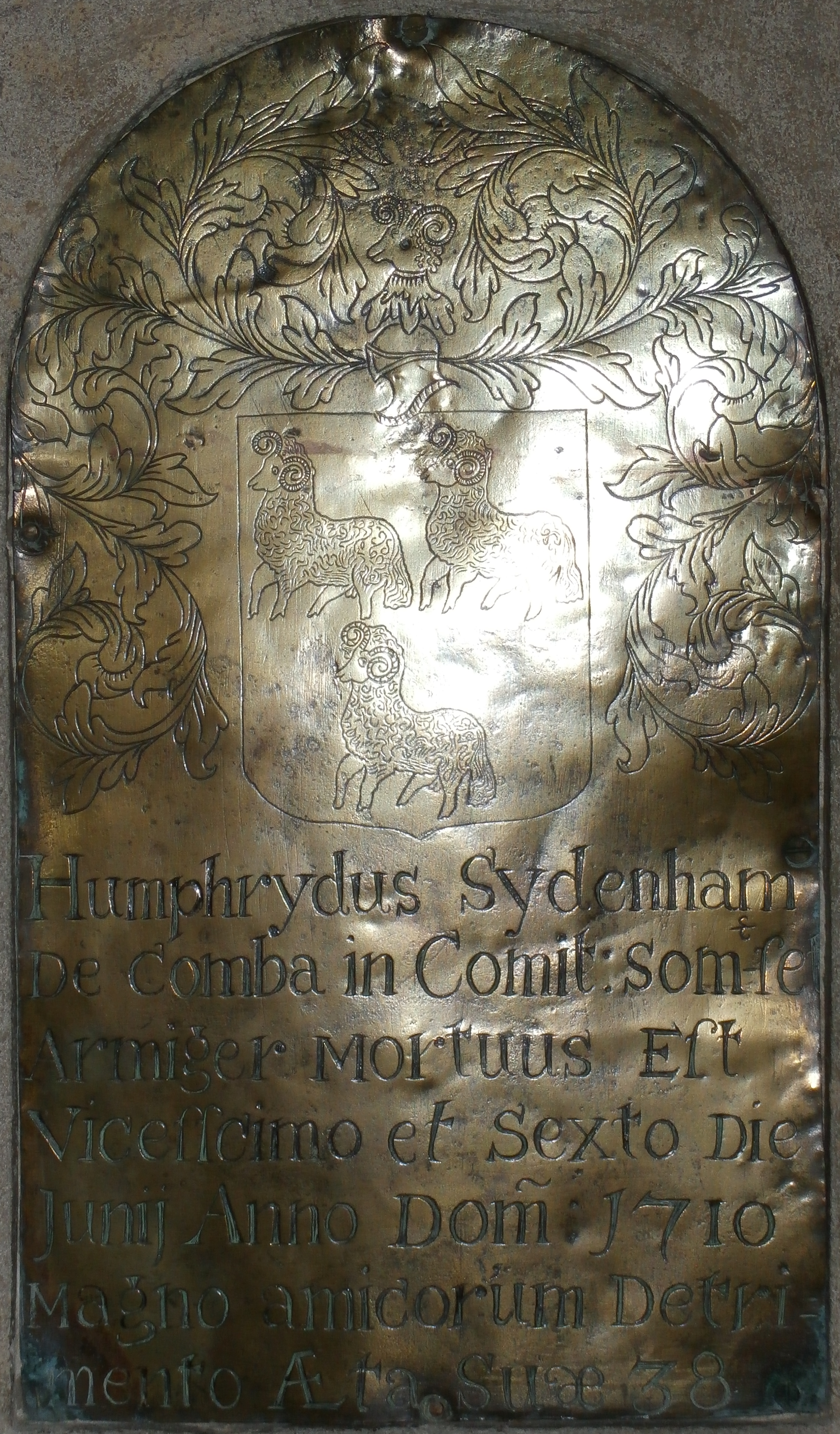
Monumental brass to Humphry Sydenham (1672–1710) of Combe, north wall of All Saints' Church, Dulverton

Humphrey Sydenham (1672–1710) of Combe, son, married firstly Eliza Peppin, daughter of George Peppin of Old Shute, Dulverton, (which family after 1858 developed the Peppin Merino breed of sheep in Australia), by whom he had an eldest son and heir Humphrey Sydenham (1694–1757) of Combe. He married secondly his first cousin Katherine Floyer, daughter of William Floyer of Berne in Dorset, by whom he had a third son Floyer Sydenham (1710–1787), the noted scholar of Ancient Greek, whose descendants appear to have been inherited Combe on the failure of male children in the senior line. His monumental brass survives on the north wall of All saints' Church, Dulverton (repositioned after the 19th century rebuilding), inscribed in Latin as follows:

Humphrydus Sydenham de Comba in comit(atu) Som(er)se^{t}, Armiger, mortuus est vicesscimo et sexto die Junii Anno Dom(ini) 1710 magno amicorum detrimento aeta(tus) suae 38. (Humphry Sydenham of Combe in the county of Somerset, Esquire, died on the twenty-sixth day of June in the year of our Lord 1710, to the great detriment of his friends, of his age 38)

Above are shown the arms of Sydenham: Argent, three rams passant sable with crest above: A ram's head erased.

==== Humphrey Sydenham (1694–1757) ====
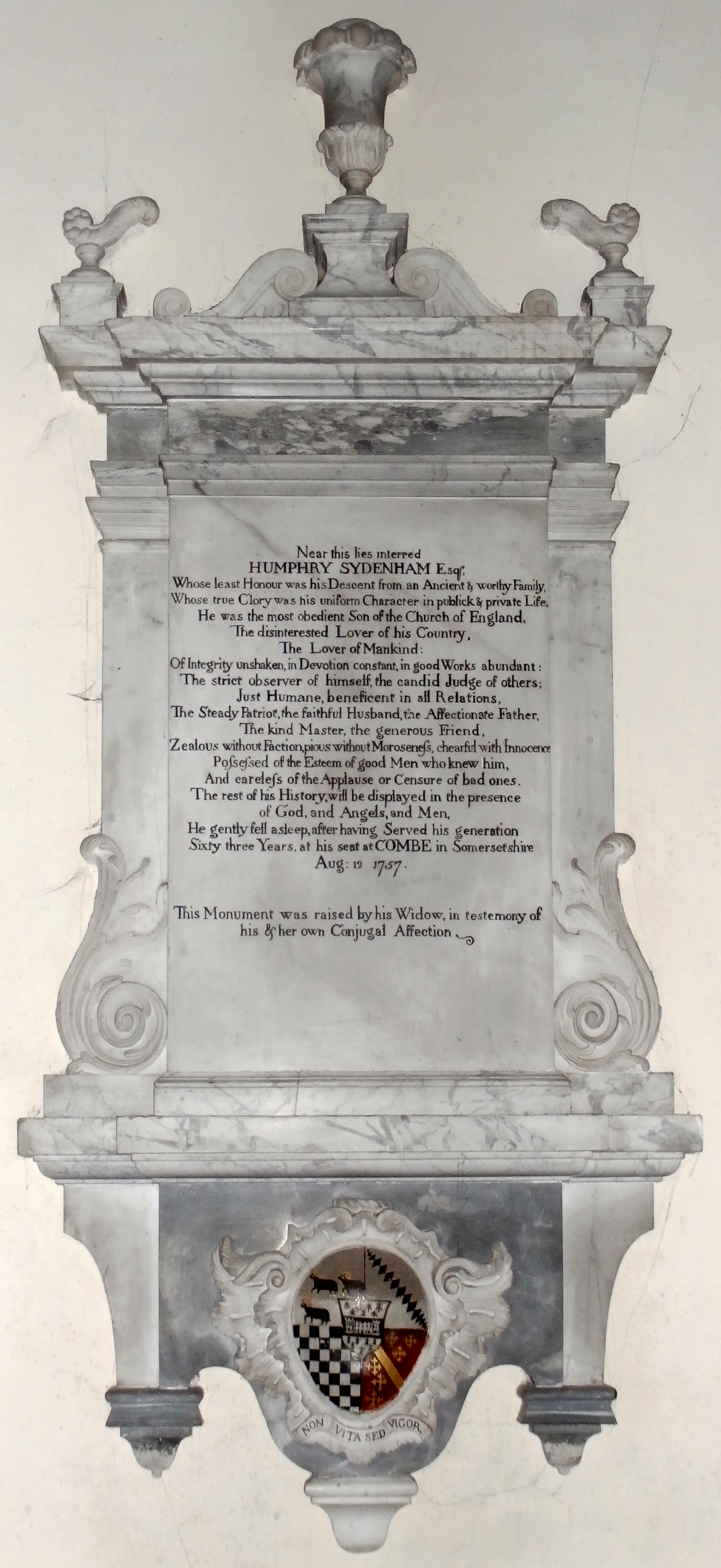
Mural monument in Dulverton Church to Humphrey Sydenham (1694–1757)

Humphrey Sydenham (1694–1757), "The Learned", of Combe and Nutcombe, Devon, eldest son and heir of Humphrey Sydenham (1672–1710), was MP for Exeter 1741-1754. His mural monument survives in All Saints' Church, Dulverton. (Note: Moved from its original position when the church was rebuilt in the 19th century) He was a lawyer trained at the Inner Temple. He married Grace Hill, 2nd daughter and co-heiress of Richard Hill (1655-1737) of Kerswell Priory in the parish of Broadhembury (who is mentioned on her father's mural monument in Broadhembury Church) (a junior branch of Hill of Hill's Court in Shropshire), by whom he had children 1 son and 3 daughters. He was ruined by the South Sea Bubble of 1720, in which he lost £20,000. His financial situation was restored by a large inheritance from his great-great-uncle Sir John St Barbe, 1st Baronet (died 1723), MP, of Broadlands in Hampshire. In the chancel of Ashington Church, Somerset, is a monument of grey and white marble, inscribed:

"Here lies Sir John St. Barbe, Bart. possessed of those amiable qualities, which birth, education, travel, greatness of spirit, and goodness of heart, produce. Interred in the fame vault lies his second wife Alice Fiennes, aunt to the prefent Lord Say and Sele. His first was Honour, daughter of Colonel Norton. He died at his seat of Broadlands in Hampshire Sept. 7, 1723, leaving for his only heir and executor Humphrey Sydenham, esq., of Combe in Somersetshire, who ordered this marble to his memory."

In 1736 Humphrey Sydenham sold Broadlands to Henry Temple, 1st Viscount Palmerston. His own mural monument in Dulverton church is inscribed as follows:

"Near this lies interred Humphry Sydenham Esqr., whose least honour was his descent from an ancient & worthy family, whose true glory was his uniform character in publick & private life. He was the most obedient son of the Church of England, the disinterested lover of his country, the lover of Mankind; of integrity unshaken, in devotion constant, in good works abundant; the stict observer of himself, the candid judge of others. Just, humane, beneficent in all relations, the steady patriot, the faithful husband, the affectionate father, the kind master, the generous friend; zealous without faction, pious without moroseness, chearful with innocence, possessed of the esteem of good men who knew him, and careless of the applause or censure of bad ones. The rest of his history will be displayed in the presence of God and angels and men. He gently fell asleep after having served his generation sixty-three years, at his seat at Combe in Somersetshire, Aug. 12 1757. This monument was raised by his widow in testemony of his & her own conjugal affection".

Underneath are displayed on an escutcheon quarterly of four: 1st: Argent, three rams passant guardant sable (Sydenham); 2nd: Argent, a bend of fusils sable (Kittisford); 3rd: Chequy argent and sable (St Barbe); 4th: Gules, a bend between six cross crosslets or (?).

Overall is an inescutcheon of pretence: Ermine, on a fesse sable a castle with three towers argent (Hill). These are the arms granted to Sir Rowland Hill of Soulton (later born, by special grant after Sir Rowland's death by the Hill baronets, and Viscount Hill) seated on one prominent line at Hawkstone Hall in the parish of Hodnet, Shropshire.

==== St. Barbe Sydenham (died 1799) ====
St. Barbe Sydenham (died 1799), the only son of Humphrey Sydenham (died 1757), was the possessor of Combe in 1791. He married Ellery Williams, daughter of Sydenham Williams of Herrinston, Dorset. He died without male children, when Combe appears to have passed to his Sydenham cousin and heir male, apparently a descendant of his first cousin Floyer Sydenham (1710–1787), and left an only daughter Catherine Sydenham (died 1794), who in 1781 married Lewis-Dimoke Grosvenor Tregonwell of Anderson in Dorset, by whom she had a son St Barbe Tregonwell of Anderson. Combe passed to a cousin:

==== John Sydenham (1759–1834) ====
John Sydenham (1759–1834), "of Combe House", as is recorded on his mural monument in Dulverton Church. He married a certain Catherine (1756–1822).

==== Rev. John Sydenham (1795–1858) ====
Rev. John Sydenham (1795–1858), of Combe House, only son. He matriculated at Exeter College, Oxford in 1814, and gained BA in 1817; and was appointed by his family as Rector of Brushford in 1835. and was prominent in establishing Brushford school in 1836. The Sydenham family of Combe had been patrons of Brushford Church from the 16th century. A dispute arose between the Sydenham and Tregonwell families as is evidenced by the lawsuit of "St Barbe Tregonwell v. John Sydenham the Elder and John Sydenham the Younger" heard on appeal by the House of Lords in 1814/15, concerning the disputed will of Humphrey Sydenham (died 1757). He had two sons:

  - Rev. John William Sydenham (1822–1859), eldest son, who matriculated at Balliol College, Oxford in 1839 and gained BA in 1844. He died at Combe on 18 January 1859.
  - Charles St Barbe Sydenham (1823–1904), second son, who matriculated at Exeter College, Oxford in 1841 and gained BA in 1845. He was appointed by his family curate of Brushford (1847–58) and rector of Brushford in 1858.

==== Rev. Charles St. Barbe Sydenham (1823–1904) ====
Rev. Charles St. Barbe Sydenham (1823–1904) (son of Rev. John Sydenham (1795–1858)), who succeeded his father as Rector of Brushford, lived at Brushford Rectory and was buried at Brushford Church 10 March 1904 aged 81. He presented three ancient illuminated manuscripts to the Library of Wells Cathedral. On 8 November 1871 he was declared bankrupt. In December 1885 he petitioned the County Court in Exeter, Devon, in connection with his bankruptcy. This had presumably necessitated the sale of Combe. He married Emily Lane, daughter of Major Henry Bowyer Lane, Royal Artillery. The fourth son of Rev. Charles St. Barbe Sydenham (died 1904) was Dr George Francis Sydenham (1861–1924), born at Combe as his monument in Dulverton Church states, who spent most of his life working as a surgeon and family doctor in Dulverton, living at Battleton House, formerly part of the Combe estate. He studied medicine at St Bartholomew's Hospital in London, gained a diploma LSA in 1884 and MRCS.Eng. in 1885. Between 1885 and 1887 he worked as assistant to Dr Samuel Evans at Harwich. In 1887 he returned to Dulverton to start his career as a family doctor. He was the local secretary of the Somerset Archaeological Society, and served as a Justice of the Peace for Somerset, and was a churchwarden of All Saints' Church, Dulverton, in which survives his mural monument. In 1907 he married Rose Hempson, second daughter of Amis Hempson of Ramsey, Harwich. He was a keen fisherman, cricketer, archaeologist and local historian, and was the author of the "massive family history" The History of the Sydenham Family, published privately in 1928 after his death.

In the north aisle of All Saints Church in Dulverton are five memorials to the Sydenham family of Combe. The Sydenham family of Combe commenced the building of the hamlet of Battleton, situated between Combe House and the River Barle, and members of the family lived at Battleton House.

=== Marriott-Dodington ===
In 1872 Combe was purchased from the Sydenham family by Thomas Marriott-Dodington (1839–1890) of Horsington House near Templecombe in Somerset, a barrister, High Sheriff of Somerset in 1887 and Lt.-Col. of the Somerset Light Infantry. The "ancient and distinguished" family of Dodington originated at the Somerset manor of Dodington. He married Lucy Elizabeth Downe, daughter of Rev. G.E. Downe of Rushden, Northamptonshire. He appears to have continued to reside at Horsington (later sold by his son Roger in 1923) and to have let Combe to a series of tenants, including:

==== Couper ====
In 1895 Combe was the residence of General James Kempt Couper (1827–1901), Indian Staff Corps, second son of Sir George Couper, 1st Baronet (1788–1861), KH, CB, and whose youngest daughter Mary Emiline Bertha Couper in 1895 married her father's landlord Roger Marriott-Dodington (1866–1925) of Orchard Portman House and Horsington House, Somerset, High Sheriff of Somerset in 1922. Roger Marriott-Dodington was the owner of Combe, being the eldest son and heir of Thomas Marriott-Dodington (died 1890) who had purchased the estate in 1872. A photograph c. 1856-57 of "James Kempt Couper 2nd Native Indian Regiment", by Ahmad Ali exists in the records of the India Office, National Archives. The Marriott-Dodington family succeeded the Wills family (Baron Dulverton) at nearby Northmoor House, Dulverton, and in 1926 were themselves succeeded by the Clayton family. Thomas Marriott-Dodington (1895–1916), the eldest son of Roger Marriott-Dodington (died 1925), was killed in action in World War I and his younger brother James Marriott-Dodington in 1937 was resident at "Northmoor Estate", Kyambu, Kenya.

==== Clarke ====
In 1913 the British colonial administrator and Army officer George Sydenham Clarke (1848–1933), former Governor of the Presidency of Bombay from 1907 to 1913, was elevated to the peerage as Baron Sydenham of Combe of Dulverton in the County of Devon. His connection with Combe is unclear. He was born at Swinderby in Lincolnshire, the eldest son of Rev. Walter John Clarke by his wife Maria Frances Mayor. He was a grandson of Major-General Tredway Clarke (died 1858) by his wife Sarah (or Sally) Sydenham, a daughter of Humphrey Sydenham (1753–1807), a jeweller in Bond Street, Mayfair, London, apparently a member of the Sydenham family of Skilgate, Barnstaple and Collumpton in Devon.

=== Harrison ===
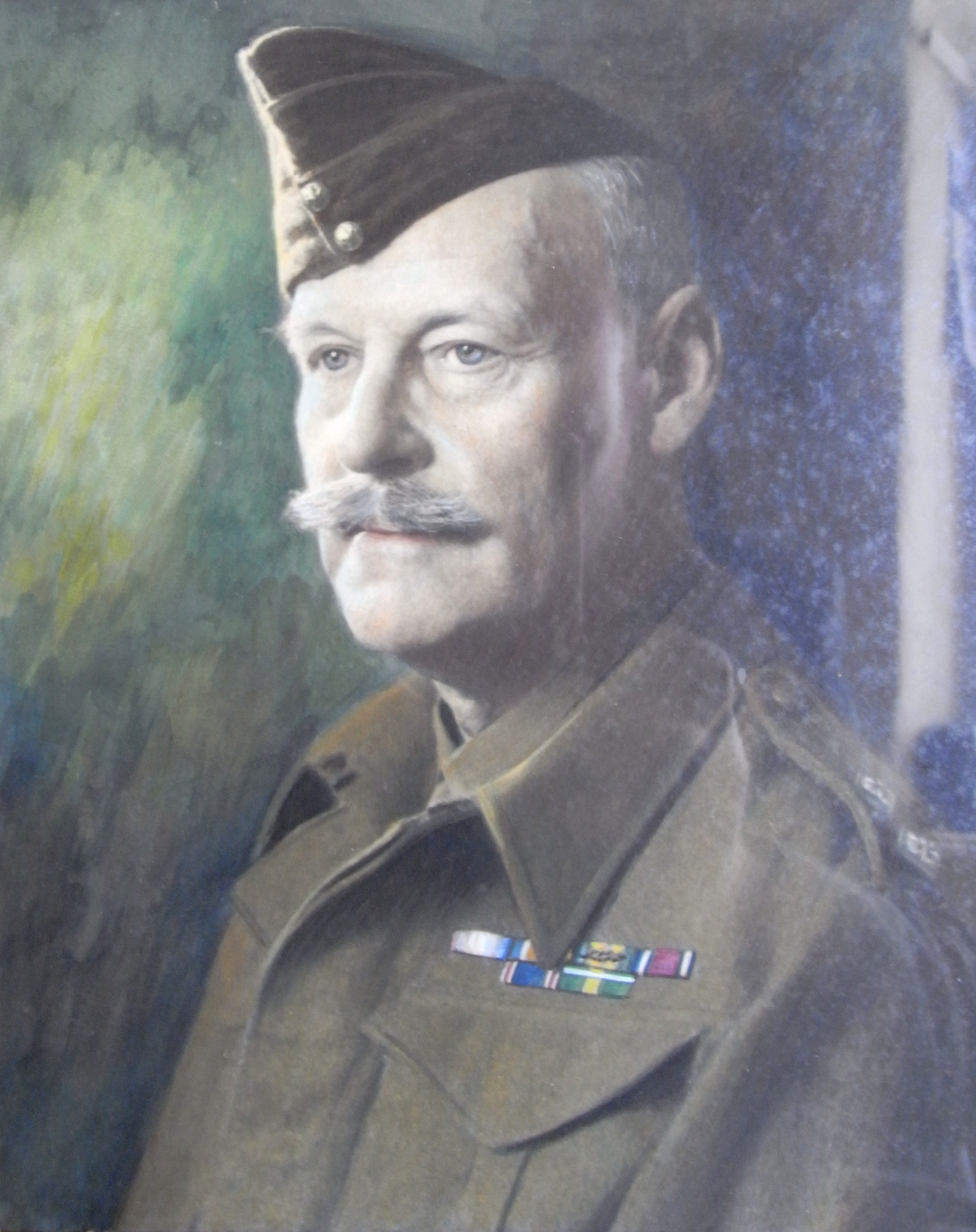
Col. Eustace James Harrison (1876–1962), TD, Hon. Colonel 6th (Rifle) Battalion, King's Regiment (Liverpool), of Combe

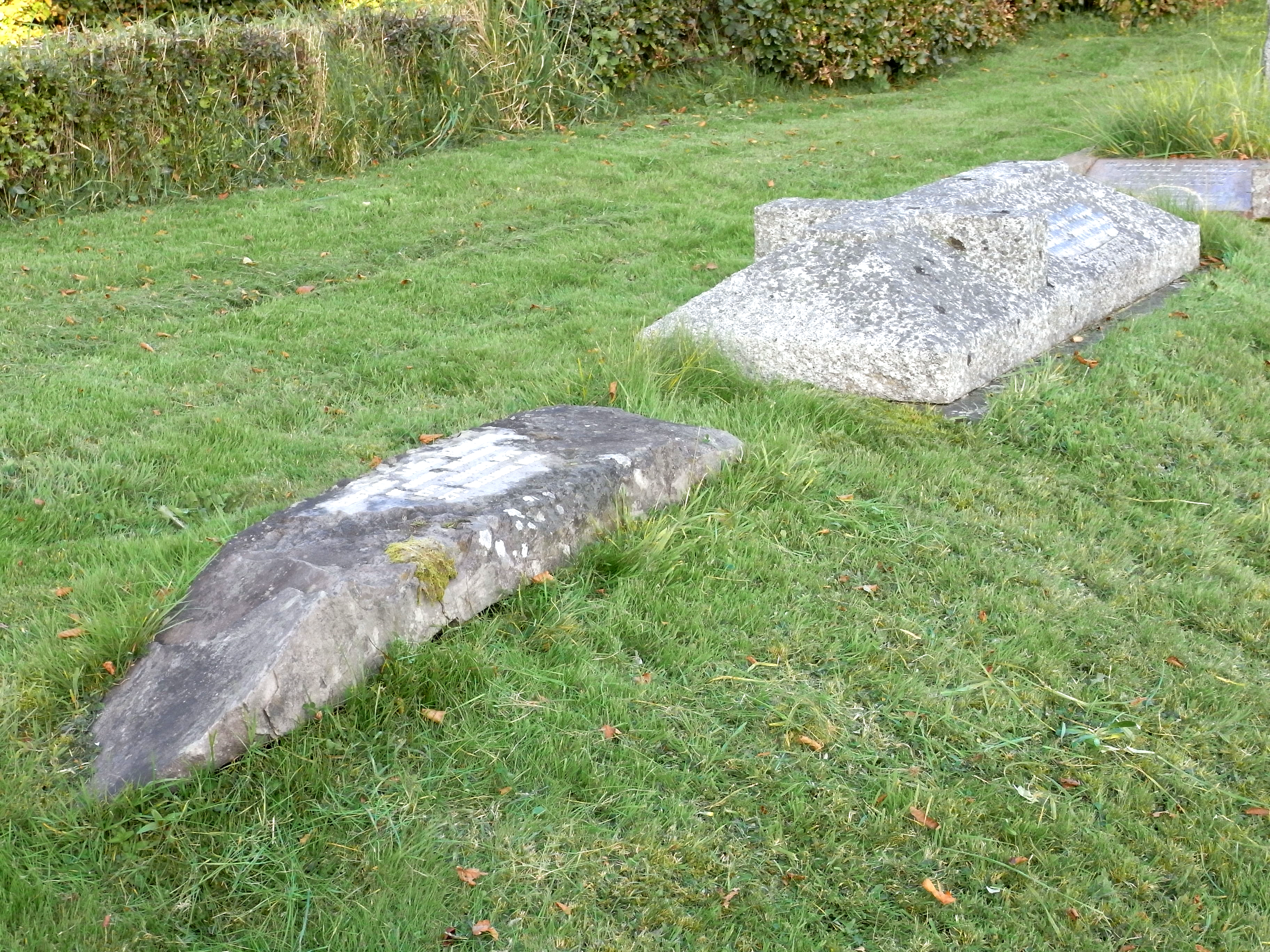
Gravestones in Hawkridge churchyard of Col. Eustace Harrison (died 1962) (foreground) "buried at the feet of" the legendary huntsman Ernest Bawden (died 1943) (background)

In 1924 Combe House and its estate of 260 acres was purchased by Col. Eustace James Harrison (1876–1962), TD, Hon. Colonel 6th (Rifle) Battalion, King's Regiment (Liverpool), lord of the manor of Hawkridge in Somerset, who served in World War I. His ancestors were from Lancashire. He was the third son of Edward Hodgson Harrison (1825–1907) of Plymyard, Eastham, Cheshire, by his wife Elizabeth Whitehead Harpin (died 1909), daughter of John Harpin of Birks House, Holmfirth, Yorkshire. His uncles were Thomas Harrison (1815–1888) and James Harrison (1821–1891) (sons of James Harrison (1781–1862) of Cockerham, Lancashire), who in 1853 founded T&J Harrison Shipping of Liverpool, which started by importing French brandy from Charente and became one of the largest UK shipping companies, operational until 2002. In 1884 Col Harrison's father Edward Hodgson Harrison owned 12 1/2% of the share capital of the newly incorporated holding company Charente Steam-Ship Company. One of the company's most famous ships was the Politician, wrecked in 1941 on the coast of Scotland carrying a cargo of whiskey, which was the subject of the 1949 comedy film Whiskey Galore.

Harrison purchased the adjoining manor of Hawkridge from the Earl of Carnarvon, of Pixton Park, directly eastwards across the River Barle from Combe. The Hawkridge estate comprised about six farms, and woods down to Castle Bridge and up towards Withypool. He built the village hall of Hawkridge in about 1941. In June 1942 Averill Mary Hill, the 11-year-old daughter of Col. Harrison's butler, was killed in a road accident when a lorry descending St Andrew's Hill, at the entrance to Combe Lane, got out of control and crashed through a fence.

Harrison was a keen follower of the Devon and Somerset Staghounds and was buried in Hawkridge churchyard, north-east of the church, "at the feet of" the legendary huntsman Ernest Bawden (1878–1943), huntsman from 1917-1937 and his tenant at one of his farms at Hawkridge. He died unmarried and without children and bequeathed his estates, including the Hawkridge farms of Tarr Steps, Cloggs, Parsonage, Zeal, and Shircombe, to his nephews, one of whom was Michael Harrison, author of The Story of Tarr Steps.

=== Wilson ===
The next owner of Combe was the Wilson family. Col. Harrison died unmarried and without children and bequeathed his estates to his nephews, one of whom (Douglas Edward) George Wilson (1906–1980) (son of Elizabeth Harpin Harrison by her husband G.D. Wilson (died 1916)) inherited Combe and together with his wife Barbara Reid Nicholl (1907–2002) is buried in Hawkridge churchyard. A small brass tablet affixed to the gatepost of Brushford churchyard is inscribed: "In memory of Barbara Wilson of Combe 1907-2002".

=== Mackelden ===
In 2015 Combe was owned by John Mackelden and his wife Julie (née Kelvie). Mackelden was rated one of the top game-bird shots in England by "The Field" magazine in 2013. He retired to Combe but in 2013 was still attending shoots regularly, mainly as a dogman picking-up shot birds, at least four days a week. On 4 July 2010 he hosted at Combe a Puppy and Novice working test for the North Devon Working Gundog Club and on 30 August 2015 an AV Novice Spaniel Working Test (incorporating novice handler).

== See also ==
- Combe Sydenham, another Somerset seat of the Sydenham family

== Sources ==
- Binding, Hilary & Bonham-Carter, Victor, Old Dulverton and Around, Exmoor Press, Williton, 1986, pp. 11–13
- Burke's Genealogical and Heraldic History of the Landed Gentry, 15th Edition, ed. Pirie-Gordon, H., London, 1937.
- Vivian, Lt.Col. J.L., (Ed.) The Visitations of the County of Devon: Comprising the Heralds' Visitations of 1531, 1564 & 1620, Exeter, 1895.
- www.everythingexmoor.org.uk
