= Great Torrington Town Hall =

Municipal building in Great Torrington, Devon, England

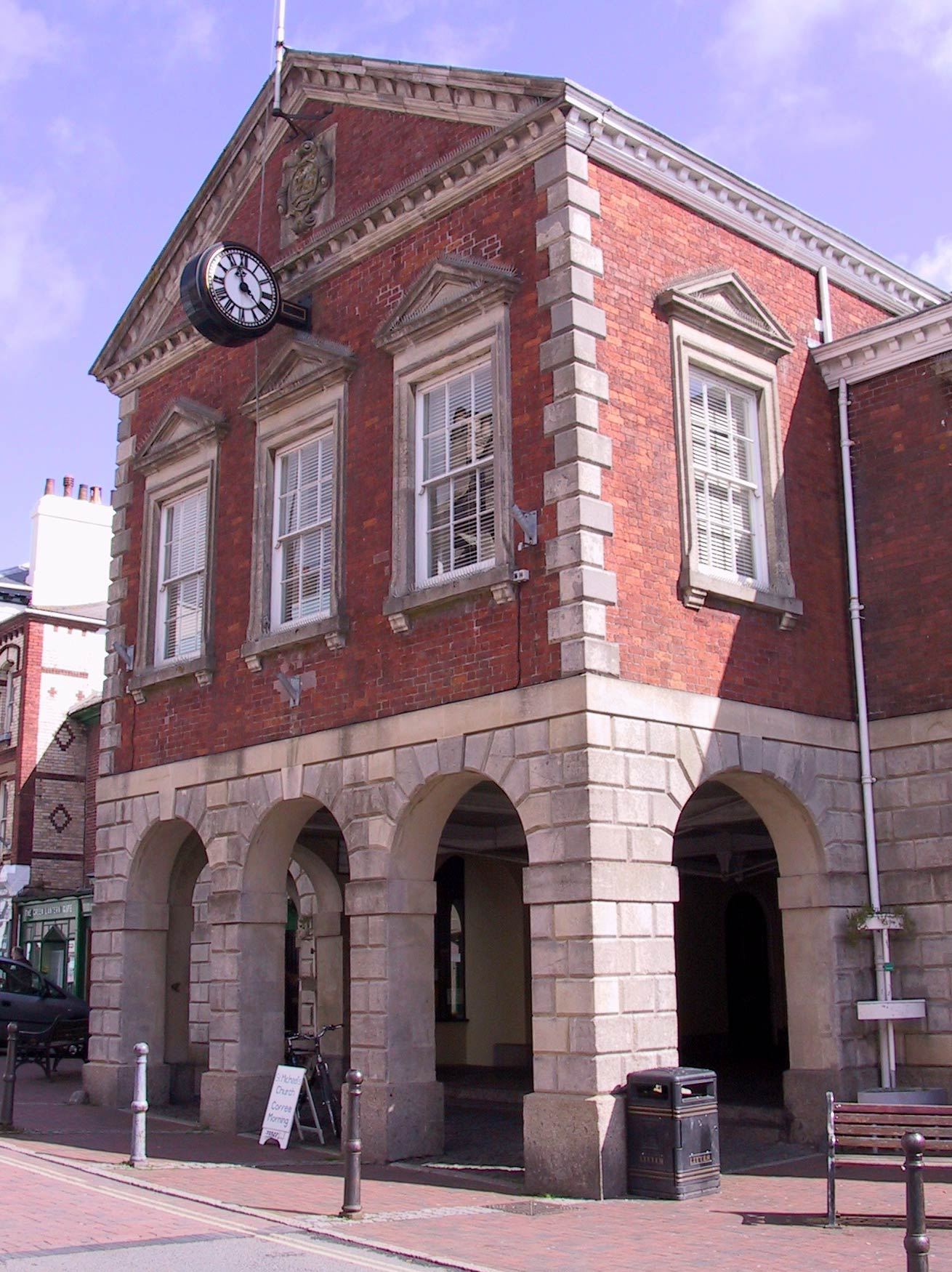
- Great Torrington Town Hall

- Shown in Devon
- 50.9520°N 4.1431°W
- Location: High Street, Great Torrington

History
- Built: 1861

Site notes
- Architectural style: Neoclassical style

Listed Building – Grade II
- Official name: Town Hall, High Street
- Designated: 19 March 1951
- Reference no.: 1332997

Great Torrington Town Hall is a municipal building in the High Street, Great Torrington, Devon, England. The town hall, which is the meeting place of Great Torrington Town Council, is a Grade II listed building.

== History ==
The first municipal building in the town was a guildhall which was completed in the 16th century. A soldier from Lancashire, Henry Boose, was found guilty of mutiny and executed outside the guildhall on the orders of the Royalist commander, Lord Goring, in July 1645 during the English Civil War. After St Michael's Parish Church was blown up by parliamentary forces in the aftermath of their victory at the Battle of Torrington in February 1646, the chaplain to the parliamentary forces, Hugh Peters, preached from the balcony of the guildhall to the people of the town. Most of the borough records were destroyed in a serious fire in the guildhall in July 1724. After a foundation stone had been laid by the town recorder and local land-owner, John Rolle Walter, the aging guildhall was substantially rebuilt in 1761.

By the mid-19th century, the guildhall had again become very dilapidated and the borough leaders decided to replace the building again. The new structure was designed in the neoclassical style, built in red brick with stone dressings and was completed in 1861. The design involved a symmetrical main frontage with five bays facing onto the High Street; the ground floor was rusticated with large round headed openings with keystones. The central section of three bays, which was projected forward, featured sash windows with architraves and pediments on the first floor. The central section was surmounted by a modillioned pediment, with a cartouche in the tympanum. Internally, the principal room was the council chamber which was lined with panelling from a local public house.

The town hall was used as a magistrates' court until 1968 and as the meeting place of the borough council until 1974: it ceased to be the local seat of government on the formation of the enlarged Torridge District Council at that time and instead became the meeting place of Great Torrington Town Council. A portrait by Pompeo Batoni of John Rolle Walter was sold to raise funds for building repairs in November 2008. An eleven-year refurbishment of the town hall, which included the complete redecoration of the building, was initiated at that time and was finally completed in April 2019.

Works of art in the town hall include portraits by Godfrey Kneller of King James II and of Queen Mary II. There is also a portrait by Thomas Hudson of John Rolle Walter's brother, Denys Rolle, and a portrait by Sir Thomas Lawrence of Denys Rolle's son, Lord Rolle.
