= William Spicer (MP for Exeter) =

British politician

Member of the Great Britain Parliament for Exeter
- In office 19 December 1767 – 1768 Serving with John Walter
- Preceded by: John Tuckfield; John Walter
- Succeeded by: John Buller; John Rolle Walter

Personal details
- Born: c.1735
- Died: 21 October 1788

William Spicer (c.1735-21 October 1788) was a British politician who served as the MP for Exeter from 19 December 1767-1768.
