= George Bampfylde, 1st Baron Poltimore =

British peer

- Born: 23 March 1786
- Died: 19 December 1858 (aged 72)
- Education: Brasenose College, Oxford
- Spouse(s): Emma Sneyd (m. 1809) Caroline Buller (m. 1836)
- Children: 2+, including Augustus
- Father: Charles Bampfylde
- Relatives: John Moore (grandfather); Richard Bampfylde (grandfather); John Bampfylde (uncle)

Arms of Bampfylde: Or, on a bend gules three mullets argent

George Warwick Bampfylde, 1st Baron Poltimore (23 March 1786 – 19 December 1858), of Poltimore, Devon, known from 1823 to 1831 as Sir George Bampfylde, 6th Baronet, was a British peer.

== Origins ==
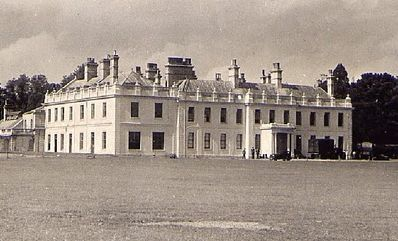
Poltimore House, seat of the Bampfylde family

Lord Bampfylde was the eldest son and heir of Sir Charles Bampfylde, 5th Baronet (1753–1823) by his wife Catherine Moore, eldest daughter of Admiral Sir John Moore, 1st Baronet. He was educated at Brasenose College, Oxford.

== Career ==
He served as lieutenant-colonel in the 1st Somerset Regiment of Militia, and succeeded to the baronetcy in 1823 after his father was killed by a former servant. Bampfylde served as vice-lieutenant of Devon and in 1831 was raised to the peerage as Baron Poltimore, of Poltimore in the County of Devon.

== Marriages and children ==
Lord Poltimore married twice:

- Firstly in 1809 to Emma Penelope Sneyd, daughter of Reverend Ralph Sneyd, Precentor of St Asaph and Chaplain to King George IV, by whom he had a daughter:
  - Emma Catherine Bampfylde (1810–1825), who died aged 15.
- Secondly in 1836 to Caroline Buller (died 1863), daughter of General Frederick William Buller of Pelynt, Cornwall, by whom he had children:
  - Augustus Bampfylde, 2nd Baron Poltimore (1837–1908).

== Death and succession ==
He died in December 1858, aged 72, and was succeeded in his titles by his son born of his second marriage, Augustus Bampfylde, 2nd Baron Poltimore (1837–1908). His widow retired to Upper Brook Street, where she lived until her death in 1863.

== Notes ==
Peerage of the United Kingdom
New creation	Baron Poltimore; 1831–1858	Succeeded by Augustus Bampfylde
Baronetage of England
Preceded by Charles Bampfylde	Baronet (of Poltimore); 1823–1858	Succeeded by Augustus Bampfylde
