= Samuel Bampfield =

American politician (1849–1899)

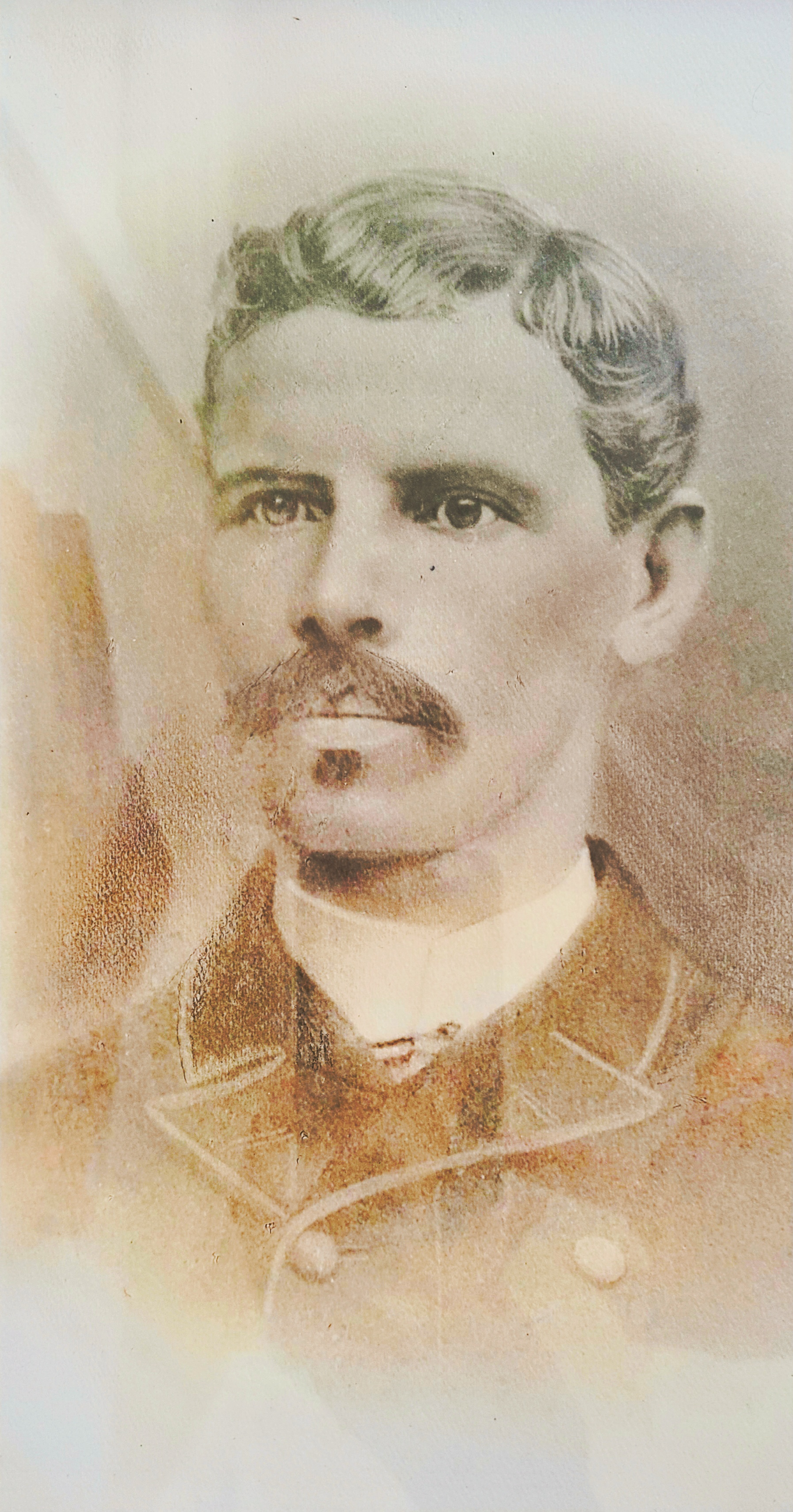
Samuel Jones Bampfield circa 1898 Beaufort, SC

Samuel Jones Bampfield (1849–1899), was an American lawyer, newspaper editor, Christian minister, and state legislator who lived in South Carolina.

== Biography ==
Bampfield was born in Charleston, South Carolina in 1849, and graduated from Lincoln University in 1872. Historian Eric Foner documented him as free born, and of mixed race. He read law in Charleston and passed the bar.

He represented Beaufort County, South Carolina in the South Carolina House of Representatives from 1874 to 1876. He also served as Beaufort's postmaster and as a clerk of the county court. He edited the New South newspaper, and belonged to the Presbyterian Church.

He founded the Berean Presbyterian Church in Beaufort in 1892. He married the 19-year-old daughter of Robert Smalls, Elizabeth Lydia Smalls. They lived at 414 New Street in Beaufort, South Carolina and had 11 children. She took over as postmaster after his death.
