= Richard Bampfield (cricketer) =

English cricketer and soldier

Personal information
- Full name: Richard Bampfield
- Born: 13 August 1898; Frome, Somerset, England
- Died: 11 August 1964 (aged 65); Rustington, Sussex, England
- Batting: Unknown

Domestic team information
- Years: Team
- 1928/29: Europeans
- 1934/35: Indian Army

Career statistics
Competition	First-class
Matches	2
Runs scored	61
Batting average	15.25
100s/50s	–/–
Top score	42
Catches/stumpings	–/–
- Source: Cricinfo, 21 December 2023

Richard Bampfield (13 August 1898 – 11 August 1964) was an English first-class cricketer and an officer in the British Indian Army.

Bampfield was born at Frome in August 1898. He was educated at St Edward's School, Oxford. From there, he went to British India to attend the Cadet College at Wellington, graduating from there into the British Indian Army as a second lieutenant in June 1917, with him seeing action in the final fifteen months of the First World War. By December 1919, he held the rank of lieutenant and acted in the capacity of an aide-de-camp until February 1920. While serving in India, Bampfield made two appearances in first-class cricket. The first came for the Europeans cricket team against the Muslims at Lahore in the 1928–29 Lahore Tournament. The second came for the Indian Army cricket team against Northern India in the 1934–35 Ranji Trophy. In these matches, he scored a total of 61 runs with a highest score of 42. In the Indian Army, promotion to captain would follow, with a further promotion to major coming in June 1935. Bampfield was a member of the 11th Sikh Regiment and spent time as an instructor at the Indian Military Academy beginning in July 1937.

Bampfield would serve with the 11th Sikh in the Second World War, seeing action in the Middle East campaign for which he was mentioned in dispatches in December 1941. He was promoted to lieutenant colonel during the war in June 1943. He retired from active service in September 1948, three years after the end of the war and a year after Indian Independence; the latter event had seen him transferred to the special list of the British Army. Bampfield died at Rustington on 11 August 1964, two days before his 66th birthday.
