= Sir John St Barbe, 1st Baronet =

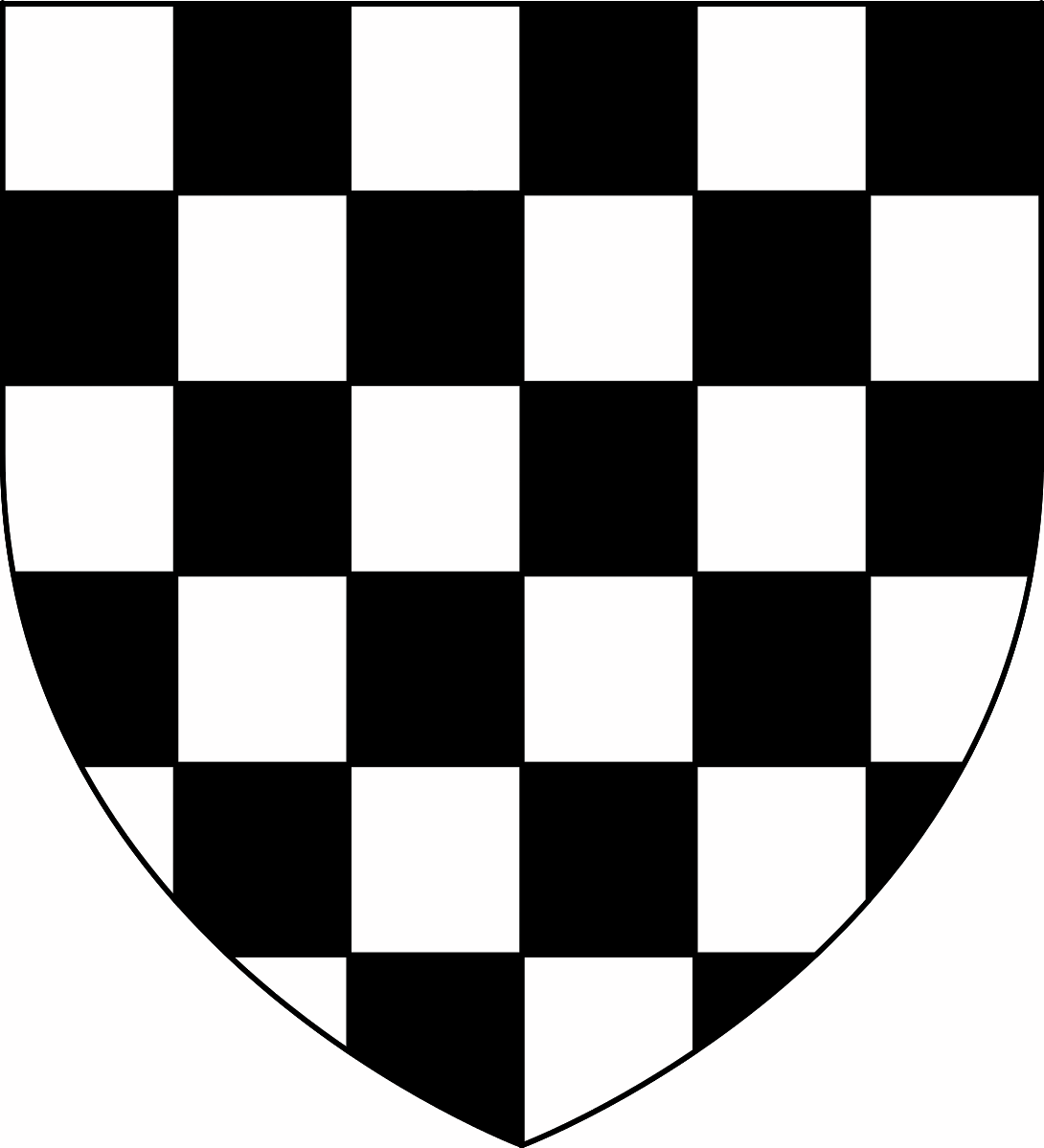
Arms of St Barbe: Chequy argent and sable

Sir John St Barbe, 1st Baronet (c. 1655 – 7 September 1723), of Ashington, Somerset and Broadlands, Hampshire, was Member of Parliament for Ilchester in 1681. He was created a baronet on 30 December 1662 at the age of 7.

== Origins ==
He was the second son of John St Barbe of Broadlands, MP for Hampshire in 1654 and a Parliamentarian in the English Civil War, by his wife Grissell Pynsent, daughter of John Pynsent of Carleton-Curliew, Leicestershire and of Combe, Surrey, Prothonotary of Common Pleas. His ancestors had been seated at Ashington, near Ilchester, in Somerset, since the 14th century, and in the late 16th century inherited Broadlands in Hampshire by marriage to the heiress.

== Career ==
In 1661 his elder brother died and John became heir to his father. In 1671 he matriculated at Magdalene College, Cambridge. In 1674 he entered the Inner Temple as a student of law. he was elected Member of Parliament for Ilchester in 1681 and served as Sheriff of Hampshire 1703–4.

== Marriages ==
He married twice but left no children:

- Firstly in 1682 to Honor Norton (died 1710), daughter of Richard Norton (1615–1691), MP, of Southwick, Hampshire.
- Secondly he married Alice Fiennes, daughter of Hon. Richard Fiennes (d. circa 1674) of Ixworth, Suffolk (4th son of William Fiennes, 1st Viscount Saye and Sele, 8th Baron Saye and Sele (1582–1662)) and widow of John Horn of Winchester, Hampshire.

== Death and succession ==
He died on 7 September 1723 and as he left no children he appointed his great-great-nephew Humphrey Sydenham (1694–1757) of Combe near Dulverton in Somerset as his sole heir and executor, who named his own son St Barbe Sydenham. The Sydenham inheritance included the manors of Broadlands and Marston Magna.

== Monument ==
In the chancel of Ashington Church, Somerset, is a monument of grey and white marble, inscribed:

"Here lies Sir John St. Barbe, Bart. possessed of those amiable qualities, which birth, education, travel, greatness of spirit, and goodness of heart, produce. Interred in the same vault lies his second wife Alice Fiennes, aunt to the present Lord Say and Sele. His first was Honour, daughter of Colonel Norton. He died at his seat of Broadlands in Hampshire Sept. 7, 1723, leaving for his only heir and executor Humphrey Sydenham, Esq., of Combe in Somersetshire, who ordered this marble to his memory."

== Sources ==
- Cassidy, Irene, biography of St. Barbe, Sir John, 1st Bt. (c. 1655 – 1723), of Broadlands, Hants., published in: History of Parliament: House of Commons 1660–1690, ed. B.D. Henning, 1983

Baronetage of England
New creation	Baronet (of Broadlands); 1662–1723	Extinct
