= Charles Bampfylde =

British politician

Sir Charles Bampfylde

Member of Parliament for Exeter
- In office 1774-1790; 1796-1812

High Sheriff of Somerset
- In office 1820-1821

Personal details
- Born: 23 January 1753
- Died: 19 April 1823 (aged 70)
- Spouse: Catharine Moore (m. 1776)
- Children: 3, including George
- Parent: Richard Bampfylde (father)
- Relatives: John Bampfylde (brother); Coplestone Bampfylde (grandfather)
- Education: New College, Oxford

Arms of Bampfylde: Or, on a bend gules three mullets argent

Sir Charles Warwick Bampfylde, 5th Baronet (23 January 1753 – 19 April 1823) of Poltimore in Devon, was a British politician who served twice as Member of Parliament for Exeter, in 1774–1790 and 1796–1812.

== Origins ==
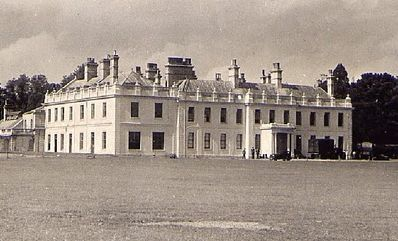
Poltimore House, seat of the Bampfylde family

He was the eldest surviving son of Sir Richard Bampfylde, 4th Baronet by his wife Jane Codrington (d. 1789), daughter and heiress of Colonel John Codrington of Charlton House, Wraxall, Somerset, near Bristol. He was baptised at St Augustine the Less Church, Bristol in Gloucestershire.

== Career ==
Bampfylde was educated at New College, Oxford and was awarded the degree of Doctor of Civil Law (DCL). In 1776, he succeeded his father as baronet. He was High Sheriff of Somerset for 1820–21 after the death in office of Gerard Berkeley Napier.

Between 1774 and 1790 Bampfylde sat as Member of Parliament for Exeter. From 1796 he represented the constituency in the Parliament of Great Britain until the Act of Union in 1801, then in the Parliament of the United Kingdom until 1812.

== Marriage and progeny ==
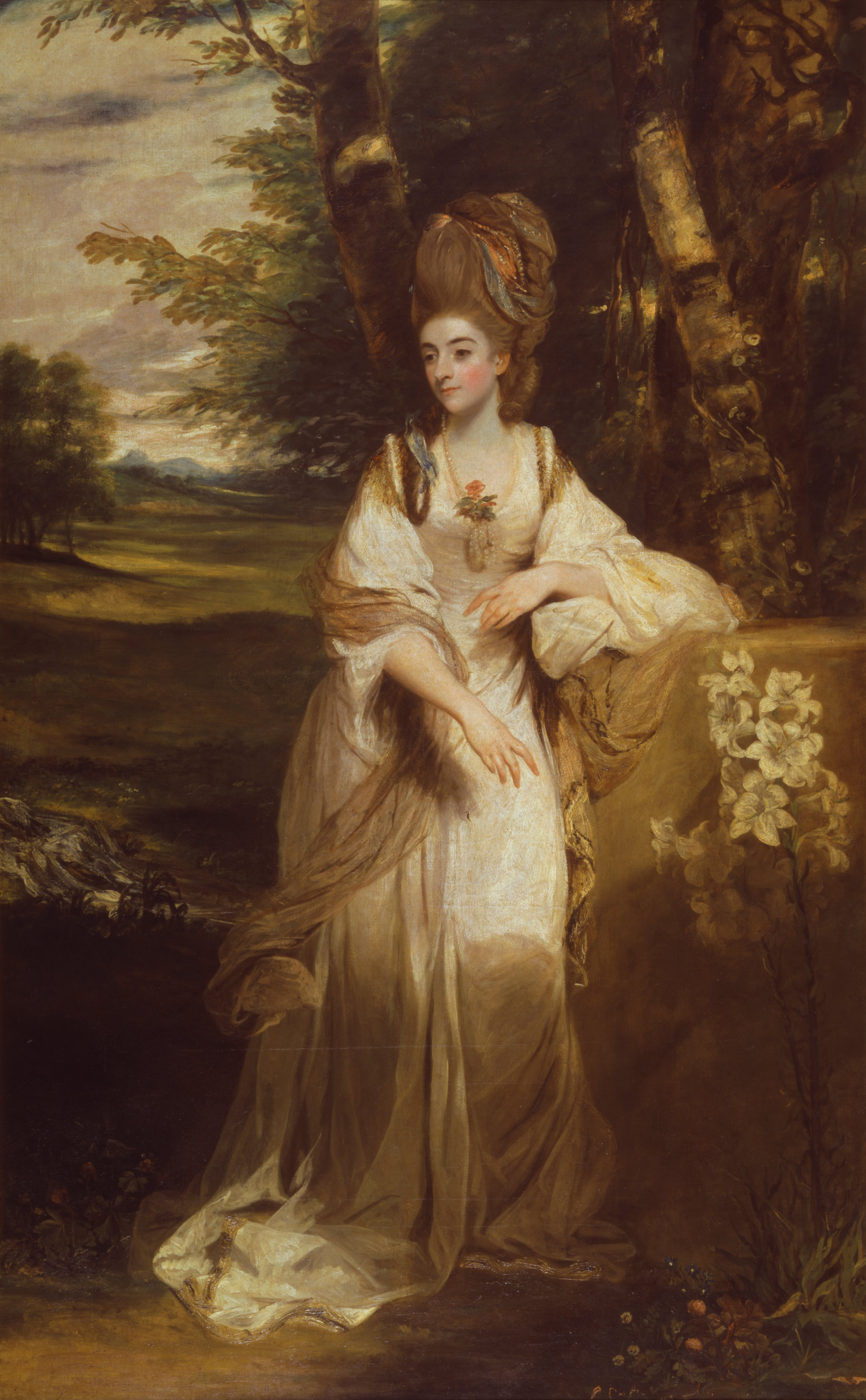
Portrait of Lady Bampfylde by Joshua Reynolds, c.1776, Tate Britain, London

On 9 February 1776, at St James's Church, Piccadilly, he married Catharine Moore, eldest daughter of Admiral Sir John Moore, 1st Baronet, by whom he had two sons and a daughter:

- George Bampfylde, 1st Baron Poltimore (1786–1858), eldest son and heir, in 1831 elevated to the peerage as Baron Poltimore.
- Rev. Charles Bampfylde, a priest.
- Louisa Bampfylde, wife of Lieutenant Edward Wells, Royal Navy.

== Murder attempt and death ==
On 7 April 1823 a shot was fired at Bampfylde in front of his house at Montagu Square in London by a jealous ex-servant, whose wife was still working in Bampfylde's household. After he had seen his shot hitting Bampfylde, the man killed himself with a second pistol.

Bampfylde survived, but died two weeks later. An autopsy showed that the shot itself had passed the lungs and had come to a stillstand between the ribs, however that with the bullet also a little piece of his braces had entered the body and had effected a deadly gangrene. Bampfylde was buried at Hardington in Somerset.

== Succession ==
His elder son George Bampfylde, 1st Baron Poltimore succeeded to the baronetcy and was later elevated to the peerage as Baron Poltimore.

Parliament of Great Britain
Preceded by John Buller; John Rolle Walter	Member of Parliament for Exeter; 1774–1790; With: John Rolle Walter 1774–1776; John Baring 1776–1790	Succeeded by James Buller; John Baring
Preceded by James Buller; John Baring	Member of Parliament for Exeter; 1796–1801; With: John Baring	Succeeded by Parliament of the United Kingdom
Parliament of the United Kingdom
Preceded by Parliament of Great Britain	Member of Parliament for Exeter; 1801–1812; With: John Baring 1801–1802; James Buller 1802–1812	Succeeded by William Courtenay; James Buller
Baronetage of England
Preceded by Richard Bampfylde	Baronet (of Poltimore); 1776–1823	Succeeded by George Bampfylde
