= Humphrey Sydenham (1591–1650) =

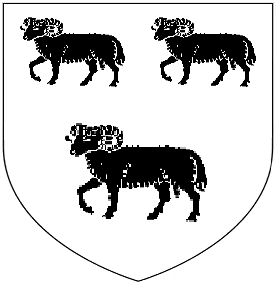
Arms of Sydenham: Argent, three rams passant guardant sable

Rev. Humphrey Sydenham (1591 – c. 1650), "Silver Tongue Sydenham", was an English royalist divine, famous for his sermons.

== Origins ==
He was born in 1591 at Dulverton in Somerset, a younger son of Humphrey I Sydenham of Combe, Dulverton in Somerset, by his first wife Jane Champneys, eldest daughter of John Champneys (1518–1569) of Uffculme, Devon, and widow of Martin Sandford of Harberton, Devon, whom she had married in 1569.

== Career ==
He matriculated at Exeter College, Oxford, in Lent term 1606, and graduated B.A. on 24 January 1610–11. In 1613 he became a Fellow of the newly founded Wadham College, Oxford, founded posthumously by his fellow Somerset resident Nicholas II Wadham (1531–1609) and his wife. He was the first to graduate as Master of Arts from that foundation on 3 December 1613. He took priest's orders in 1621, became librarian at Wadham in 1623, and was incorporated at Cambridge in 1625. He resigned his fellowship in 1628. In the meantime he had been appointed chaplain to Lord Howard of Escrick, and on 15 December 1627 he was presented by the king to the vicarage of Ashbrittle, Somerset, holding that preferment down to 1645. On 18 May 1629 he was presented by Sir Hugh Portman to the rectory of Puckington in the same county. He was collated to the Prebend of Wedmore Tertia in Wells Cathedral in 1642, and on 14 December 1644 he was instituted to the rectory of Odcombe, Somerset, upon the presentation of the king, during the minority of his distant kinsman, Sir John Sydenham, 2nd Baronet (1643–1696) of Brympton D'Evercy, Somerset. But he held this preferment for little more than a year, when he was ejected from all his benefices by the parliamentary commissioners.

Though very devout and learned in biblical lore, Sydenham was an unbending royalist and suffered accordingly. Consummata eloquentia celeberrimus ("most famous in consummate eloquence"), he is described by Lloyd as "happy in having the tongue of men and angels" (Memoirs, p. 625). "A person of a quaint and curious style, better at practical than at school divinity", he was so eloquent and fluent a preacher that he was "commonly called Silver Tongue Sydenham" (Wood). His numerous dedications and epistles dedicatory show what a panegyrical turn he could give to his silvery periods. He appears to have died in 1650, and was buried at Dulverton. An elder brother, Roger Sydenham, matriculated at Exeter College, Oxford, and entered the Middle Temple in 1607.

== Inheritance ==
When his elder brother, John Sydenham of Combe, died without male children, Humphrey inherited the paternal estates. John Sydenham had married Margery Poulet, daughter of Sir Anthony Poulett (1562–1600) (alias Paulet), of Hinton St George, Somerset, Governor of Jersey, and Captain of the Guard to Queen Elizabeth. Her brother was John Poulett, 1st Baron Poulett (1585–1649). John died without male children, leaving only four daughters.

== Marriage and children ==
He married Mary Cox, daughter of William Cox of Crewkerne, Somerset, by whom he had children including Humphrey Sydenham, of Combe, who married Jane Pole, the second daughter and eventual co-heiress of Sir William Pole, Knight (1614–1649), eldest son and heir apparent of Sir John Pole, 1st Baronet (died 1658) of Shute, Devon, by his second wife Katherine St Barbe, only daughter of Henry St Barbe of Broadlands, Hampshire.

== Works ==
Sydenham's works are:

- Natures Overthrow and Deaths Triumph … preached at the Funeral of Sir John Sydenham, kt., at Brimpton, 15 Dec. 1625; dedicated to his affectionate kinsman, John Sydenham, London, 1626, and 1636.
- Five Sermons upon severall occasions preached at Paul's Crosse and at St. Maries in Oxford, London, 1626; dedicated to Lord Danvers, Earle of Danby, 1626 [1627].
- Sermons by Humph. Sydenham, late Fellow of Wadham College. Religioni non Gloriæ, London, 1630; with an epistle dedicatory to Sir Hugh Portman, bart. Several of these discourses had appeared separately with much acceptance, notably "The Rich Man's Warning Peece" and "Waters of Marah", directed against the "Pseudo-Zealots of our Age".
- Sermons upon Solemn Occasions: preached in severall Auditories, London, 1637, dedicated to William Laud, Archbishop of Canterbury. Of these, two sermons preached at Taunton assizes, 1634 and 1635, were issued separately as The Christian Duell (London, 1837, (sic)), with a dedication to Sir John Poulett. (His elder brother John Sydenham was the husband of Margery Poulett, sister of John Poulett, 1st Baron Poulett (1585–1649)).

== Sources ==
- Seccombe, Thomas (1898). "Sydenham, Humphrey" . In Lee, Sidney (ed.). Dictionary of National Biography. Vol. 55. London: Smith, Elder & Co. (largely quoted verbatim, out of copyright)
- Burke, John (1838). A genealogical and heraldic history of the extinct and dormant baronetcies of England, by J. and J. B. Burke. p. 517.

Attribution

This article incorporates text from a publication now in the public domain: Seccombe, Thomas (1898). "Sydenham, Humphrey". In Lee, Sidney (ed.). Dictionary of National Biography. Vol. 55. London: Smith, Elder & Co.
