= Broadlands =

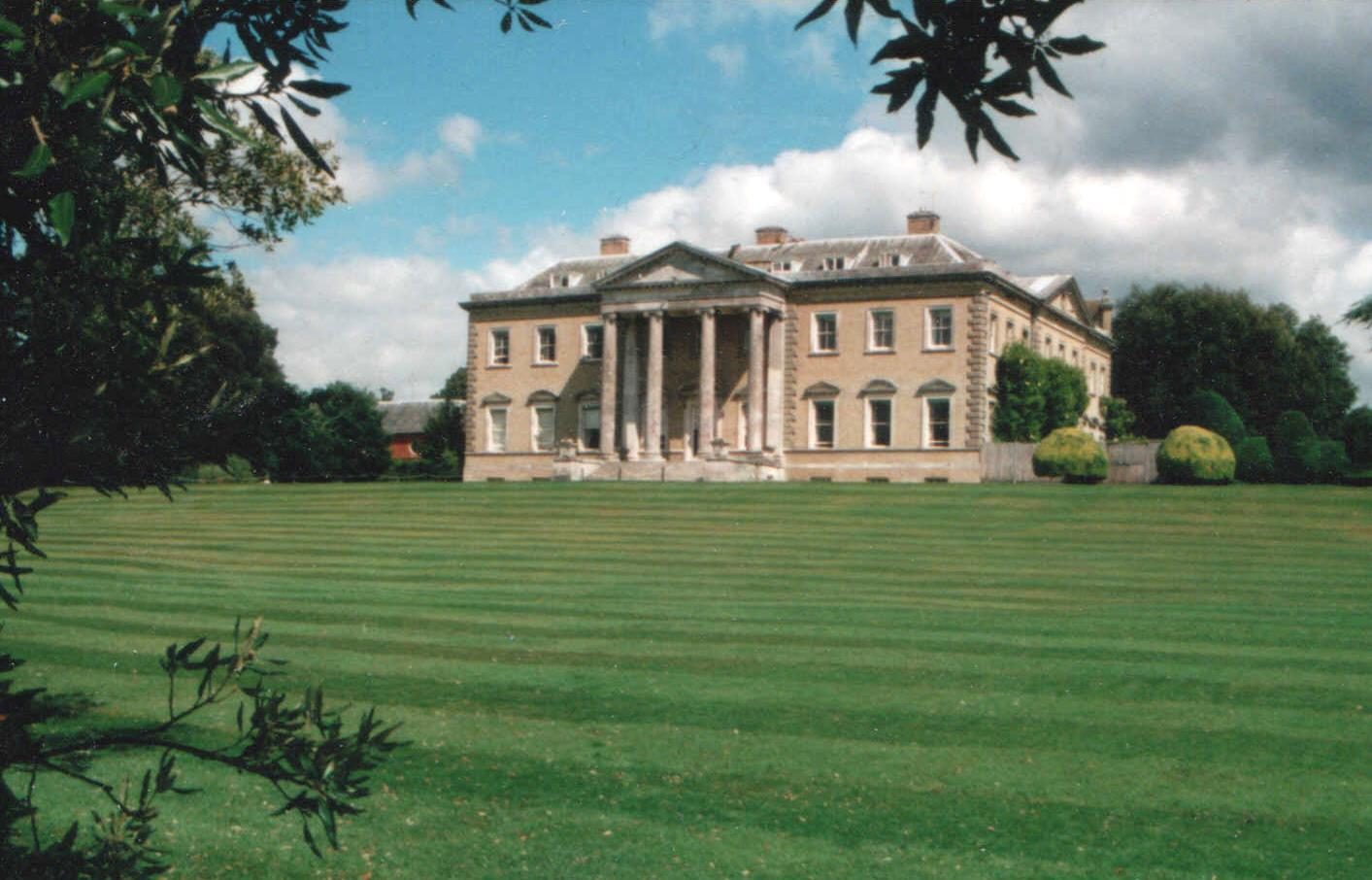
- Broadlands, 2000

- Location within Hampshire
- 50°58′50″N 1°29′49″W
- Type: Country house
- Location: Romsey
- OS grid reference: SU 35391 20242

History
- Built: 1767

Site notes
- Area: Hampshire
- Architect(s): Henry Holland; Capability Brown
- Architectural style: Palladian
- Owner: The 3rd Earl Mountbatten of Burma

Listed Building – Grade I
- Official name: Broadlands House
- Designated: 29 May 1957
- Reference no.: 1166489

National Register of Historic Parks and Gardens
- Official name: Broadlands
- Designated: 31 May 1984
- Reference no.: 1000166

Broadlands is a country house located in the civil parish of Romsey Extra, near the town of Romsey in the Test Valley district of Hampshire, England. Its formal gardens and historic landscape are Grade II* listed on the Register of Historic Parks and Gardens. The house itself is Grade I listed.

== History ==
The original manor and area known as Broadlands belonged to Romsey Abbey since before the Norman Conquest.

In 1547, after the dissolution of the monasteries, Broadlands was sold to Sir Francis Fleming. His granddaughter married Edward St Barbe, and the manor remained the property of the St Barbe family for the next 117 years. Sir John St Barbe, 1st Baronet (c. 1655–1723) made many improvements to the property but died without children, bequeathing his estate to his cousin Humphrey Sydenham of Combe, Dulverton. In the chancel of Ashington Church, Somerset, is a monument of grey and white marble, inscribed:

Here lies Sir John St. Barbe, Bart. possessed of those amiable qualities, which birth, education, travel, greatness of spirit, and goodness of heart, produce. Interred in the same vault lies his second wife Alice Fiennes, aunt to the present Lord Say and Sele. His first was Honour, daughter of Colonel Norton. He died at his seat of Broadlands in Hampshire Sept. 7, 1723, leaving for his only heir and executor Humphrey Sydenham, esq., of Combe in Somersetshire, who ordered this marble to his memory.

Having been ruined by the 18th-century South Sea Bubble, Sydenham sold Broadlands in 1736, with its Tudor and Jacobean manor house, to Henry Temple, 1st Viscount Palmerston, for £26,500. The Viscount began the deformalisation of the gardens between the river and the house and produced the broad-lands, a "gentle descent to the river". In 1767, a major architectural "transformation" of the house and garden was begun by Capability Brown, the celebrated architect and landscape designer, and completed by the architect Henry Holland, which made Broadlands the Palladian-style country house seen today. Henry Temple, 2nd Viscount Palmerston had requested that Brown go there and seize upon the "capabilities" of the earlier manor house. Between 1767 and 1780, William Kent's earlier "deformalising work" was completed, as well as further landscaping, planting, clearing and riverside work.

Broadlands was the country estate of the 19th-century British prime minister Henry John Temple, 3rd Viscount Palmerston. After his death, the estate was inherited by his step-son, William Cowper-Temple, 1st Baron Mount Temple (1811–1888). A devout Christian, he held public prayer meetings in the grounds and also banned all blood-sports on the property. On his death, the estate passed to his nephew, Evelyn Ashley (1836-1907), a younger son of Anthony Ashley-Cooper, 7th Earl of Shaftesbury (1801-1885) and Lord Mount Temple's sister Lady Emily Cowper (1810-1872). Subsequently, Broadlands passed to Evelyn Ashley's son Wilfrid Ashley, 1st Baron Mount Temple, who died in 1939 and left it to his daughter Edwina Ashley, the wife of Lord Louis Mountbatten.

Elizabeth II (then Princess Elizabeth) and Prince Philip spent their honeymoon at Broadlands in November 1947; the first Earl Mountbatten of Burma, whose home Broadlands was at the time, was Philip's uncle. In 1981, the newly married Prince Charles (later Charles III) and the Princess of Wales also spent the first three days of their honeymoon at Broadlands, travelling to the estate by special train from London Waterloo.

== The present ==
Broadlands is the home of the Earl and Countess Mountbatten of Burma. The house is open to the public for guided tours on weekday afternoons in summer.

On 1 August 2004, Irish vocal pop band Westlife held a concert at Broadlands as part of their Turnaround Tour promoting their album Turnaround.

== See also ==
- Grade I listed buildings in Hampshire
- List of gardens in England
- List of country houses in the United Kingdom

== Bibliography ==
- Turner, Roger (1999). Capability Brown and the Eighteenth Century English Landscape. Second edition. Phillimore (Chichester, England). pp. 108–110. ISBN 978-1-86077-114-9.
- Grassinger, Dagmar (1994). Antike Marmorskulpturen auf Schloss Broadlands (Hampshire). Corpus Signorum Imperii Romani Great Britain. Vol. 3, 4. Mainz: Philipp von Zabern. ISBN 3-8053-1492-2.
