= John Codrington Bampfylde =

English poet

John Codrington Bamfylde
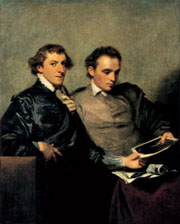
- John Codrington Bampfylde (right) with George Huddesford, double portrait by Joshua Reynolds
- Born: 27 August 1754
- Died: 1796 or 1797 (aged 41-43)
- Education: Trinity Hall, Cambridge
- Father: Richard Bampfylde
- Relatives: Charles Bampfylde (brother); Coplestone Bamfylde (grandfather); George Bampfylde (nephew)

John Codrington Warwick Bampfylde (or Bampfield; 27 August 1754 – 1796/1797) was an 18th-century English poet. He came from a prominent Devon family, his father being Sir Richard Bampfylde, 4th Baronet, and was educated at Trinity Hall, Cambridge. He had financial problems, having fallen into dissipation on going to London. His romantic advances to Mary Palmer (later wife of Murrough O'Brien, 1st Marquess of Thomond), niece of Joshua Reynolds, were refused by her and discouraged by Reynolds, who expelled Bampfylde from the house. Bampfylde was subsequently arrested for breaking Reynolds's windows, and he spent the latter part of his life in a psychiatric hospital in London, briefly regaining his sanity before his death from tuberculosis.

His only published work was Sixteen Sonnets (1778), which attracted the attention of Robert Southey.
