= Augustus Bampfylde, 2nd Baron Poltimore =

British Liberal politician

The Right Honourable The Lord Poltimore PC DL

Treasurer of the Household
- In office 1 March 1872 – 17 February 1874
- Monarch: Queen Victoria
- Prime Minister: William Ewart Gladstone
- Preceded by: The Lord de Tabley
- Succeeded by: The Lord Monson

Personal details
- Born: 12 April 1837
- Died: 3 May 1908 (aged 71)
- Party: Liberal
- Spouse: Florence Brinsley Sheridan (m. 1858)
- Parent(s): George Bampfylde, 1st Baron Poltimore; Caroline Buller

Augustus Frederick George Warwick Bampfylde, 2nd Baron Poltimore PC DL (12 April 1837 – 3 May 1908), styled The Honourable Augustus Bampfylde until 1858, of Poltimore House and North Molton in Devon, was a British Liberal politician. Between 1872 and 1874 he served as Treasurer of the Household to Queen Victoria, under William Ewart Gladstone.

== Origins ==
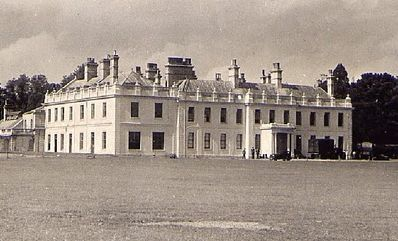
Poltimore House, seat of the Bampfylde family

Bampfylde was the son and heir of George Bampfylde, 1st Baron Poltimore, by his second wife Caroline Buller, daughter of General Frederick William Buller.

== Career ==
Bampfylde succeeded his father in the barony in 1858. He sat on the Liberal benches in the House of Lords and served in the first Liberal administration of William Ewart Gladstone as Treasurer of the Household from 1872 to 1874.

In 1872, he was sworn of the Privy Council. He was appointed Commanding Officer of the 1st (Exeter and South Devon) Devonshire Rifle Volunteer Corps on 27 September 1865.

== Marriage and children ==
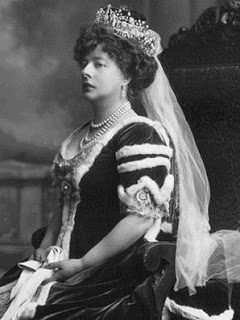
Lady Poltimore wearing her peeress robes and the Poltimore Tiara

In 1858 Lord Poltimore married Florence Sara Wilhelmine Brinsley Sheridan (d. February 1909), daughter of Richard Brinsley Sheridan, MP, of Frampton Court. By her he had children including:

- Coplestone Richard George Warwick Bampfylde, 3rd Baron Poltimore (1859–1918)

=== Poltimore Tiara ===
Florence, Lady Poltimore, had a diamond tiara made for her by Garrards of London in the 1870s, later known as the Poltimore Tiara. It was sold at auction by the 4th Baron for £5,500. It was made famous after having been worn by Princess Margaret at her wedding in 1960 in Westminster Abbey, having been purchased for her shortly beforehand. After the Princess's death, it was sold at auction in 2006 at Christie's, by her children, Viscount Linley and Lady Sarah Chatto, for £926,400 ($1,704,576). It can be converted into a necklace and brooches.

== Death and burial ==
He died in May 1908, aged 71.

Political offices
| Preceded by The Lord de Tabley | Treasurer of the Household; 1872–1874 | Succeeded by The Lord Monson |
Peerage of the United Kingdom
| Preceded by George Warwick Bampfylde | Baron Poltimore; 1858–1908 | Succeeded by Coplestone Bampfylde |
