= Humphrey Sydenham (1694–1757) =

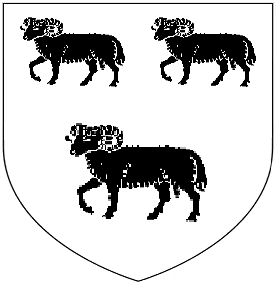
Arms of Sydenham: Argent, three rams passant guardant sable

Humphrey Sydenham (24 October 1694 – 12 August 1757), "The Learned", of Combe, Dulverton in Somerset, and of Nutcombe in Devon, was a Tory MP for Exeter, in Devon, between 1741 and 1754.

== Origins ==
Humphrey Sydenham was the eldest son and heir of Humphrey Sydenham (1672–1710) of Combe, which family had long been seated at that place, by his first wife Eliza Peppin, daughter of George Peppin of Old Shute, Dulverton, which family after 1858 developed the Peppin Merino breed of sheep in Australia.

== Career ==
He was a lawyer trained at the Inner Temple. Horace Walpole called him "a mad High Church zealot" though on another occasion he wrote that Sydenham was "an honest devout gentleman, who always talked out of the Common Prayer Book". He was temporarily ruined by the South Sea Bubble of 1720, in which he lost £20,000.

=== St Barbe inheritance ===
His financial situation was restored by a large inheritance from his great-great-uncle Sir John St Barbe, 1st Baronet (died 1723), MP, of Broadlands in Hampshire. As his heir and executor, Sydenham erected a marble monument in Barbe's memory in the chancel of Ashington Church, Somerset.

In 1736, Sydenham sold Broadlands to Henry Temple, 1st Viscount Palmerston.

== Marriage and children ==
He married Grace Hill, daughter and heiress of Richard Hill of the Priory, near Exeter, by whom he had one son and three daughters including:

- St. Barbe Sydenham (died 1799), only son and heir, who was the possessor of Combe in 1791. He married Ellery Williams, daughter of Sydenham Williams of Herrinston, Dorset. He died without male children, when Combe appears to have passed to a Sydenham cousin.

== Monument at Dulverton ==
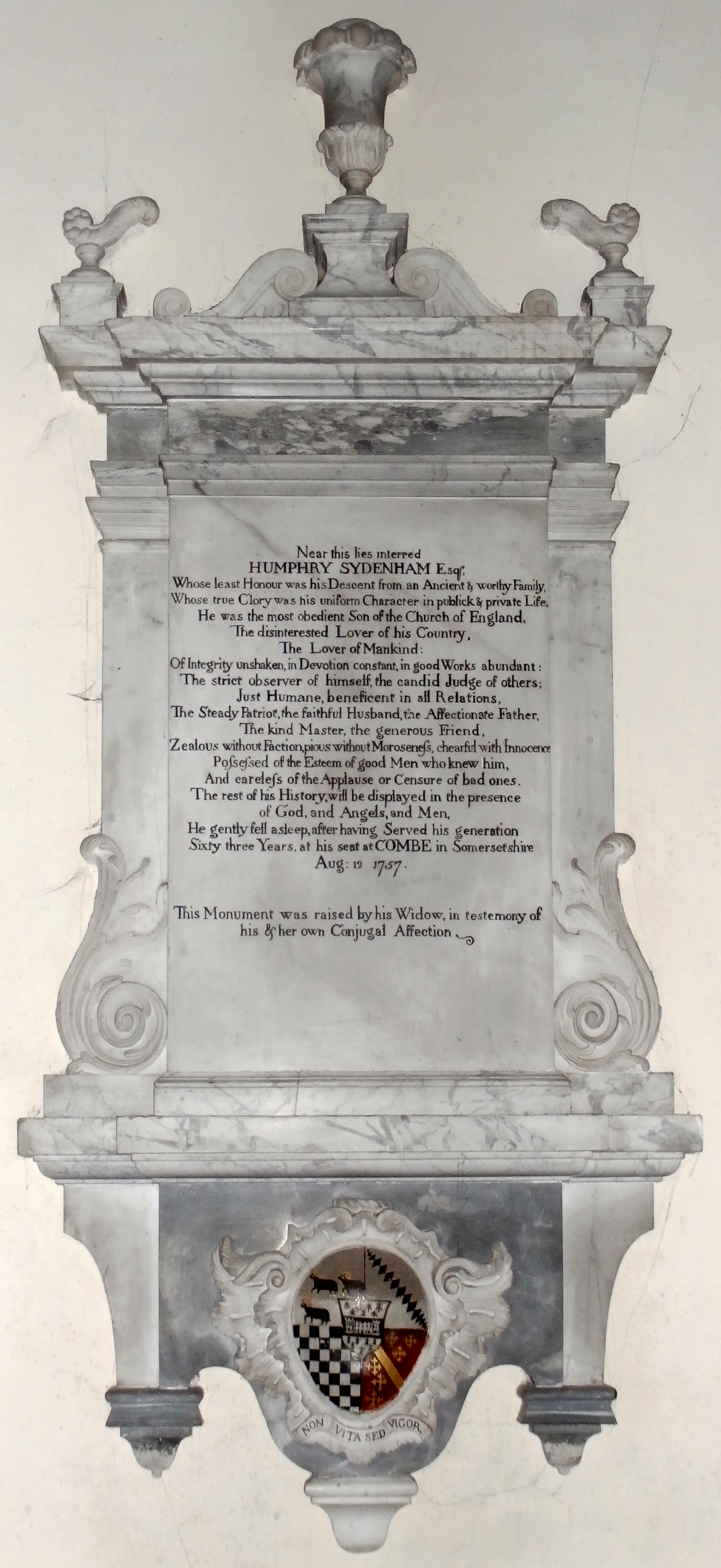
Mural monument in Dulverton Church to Humphrey Sydenham (1694–1757)

His mural monument in Dulverton church is inscribed as follows:

"Near this lies interred Humphry Sydenham Esqr., whose least honour was his descent from an ancient & worthy family, whose true glory was his uniform character in publick & private life. He was the most obedient son of the Church of England, the disinterested lover of his country, the lover of Mankind; of integrity unshaken, in devotion constant, in good works abundant; the stict observer of himself, the candid judge of others. Just, humane, beneficent in all relations, the steady patriot, the faithful husband, the affectionate father, the kind master, the generous friend; zealous without faction, pious without moroseness, chearful with innocence, possessed of the esteem of good men who knew him, and careless of the applause or censure of bad ones. The rest of his history will be displayed in the presence of God and angels and men. He gently fell asleep after having served his generation sixty-three years, at his seat at Combe in Somersetshire, Aug. 12 1757. This monument was raised by his widow in testemony of his & her own conjugal affection".

Underneath are displayed on an escutcheon quarterly of four: 1st: Argent, three rams passant guardant sable (Sydenham); 2nd: Argent, a bend of fusils sable (Kittisford); 3rd: Chequy argent and sable (St Barbe); 4th: Gules, a bend between six cross crosslets or (?). Overall is an inescutcheon of pretence: Ermine, on a fesse sable a castle argent (Hill).
