= John Hull (MP for Exeter) =

- Born: John Hull II; 1503. Exeter, Devon, England
- Died: c. 1549; Exeter, Devon, England
- Known for: Member of Parliament
- Notable work: Widening the river Exe.

John Hull (by 1503 – 10 or 16 September 1549), of Larkbeare, Exeter, Devon, was an English lawyer and politician. He was the MP for Exeter from 1539 to 1542 with William Hurst, and again in 1547–49 with Griffith Ameredith. At the time Exeter was one of the wealthiest cities in England, rivaling London. His main work was a bill and subsequent project to widen and dredge the river Exe. It is thought that he became a member of parliament for the purpose of securing an inheritance denied him by Sir John Paulet.

He is not to be confused with the 14th century mayor of Exeter of the same name.

== Early life and family ==
Hull was the son of John Hull of Larkbeare and his wife Joan née Trickhay, daughter of Nicholas Trickhay. His father was a merchant, from a trading background, this would go on to shape John Hull's interest in projects associated with trade, notably his project to improve navigation on the river Exe. Hull trained to be a lawyer at Middle Temple, London. He married Joan French, a daughter of Walter French of Ottery St. Mary.

== Career and death ==
He was a Member (MP) of the Parliament of England for Exeter in 1539 and 1547, during the reign of Henry VIII. He was instrumental in a project to dredge and widen the river Exe, and organised other significant engineering projects. During the western rebellion, he was in charge of Exeter's defences and resisted the attackers, after the rebellion he was made a commissioner to collect tribute for repair to the city caused by the rebellion.

At some point in his life he was a customs officer. He acted as a justice of the peace for Devon from 1543 until his sudden death in September 1549 and was buried in Exeter Cathedral. Shortly before his death he named his widow sole legatee of his estate.

Parliament of England
Preceded by ? ?	Member of Parliament for Exeter; 1539; With: William Hurst	Succeeded by William Hurst; Thomas Spurway
Parliament of England
Preceded by John Grenville; William Hurst	Member of Parliament for Exeter; 1547 replaced by Thomas Prestwood; With: Griffith Ameredith	Succeeded by Robert Weston; Richard Hart
