= Mount Radford, Exeter =

Historic estate in Devon, England

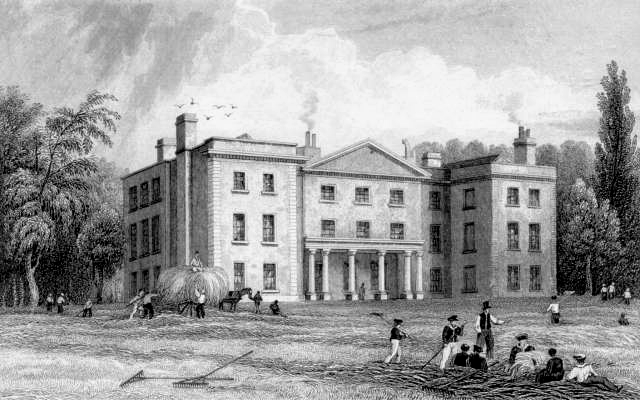
Mount Radford House, as re-built in the Georgian style after 1755 by John Baring (1730–1816). 1830/2 engraving, when in use as a school

Mount Radford is an historic estate in the parish of St Leonards, adjacent to the east side of the City of Exeter in Devon.

== Descent ==
=== Radford ===
- Lawrence Radford was the builder of Mount Radford House, during the reign of Queen Elizabeth I (1558–1603). In the words of the Devon historian Sir William Pole (died 1635): Uppon a little ascending hill did Lawrence Radford Esqr. bwild hym a fayre howse & called it Mount Radford.
- Arthur Radford, son, who sold it to Edward Hancock (died 1603), MP, lord of the manor of Combe Martin, North Devon.

=== Hancock ===
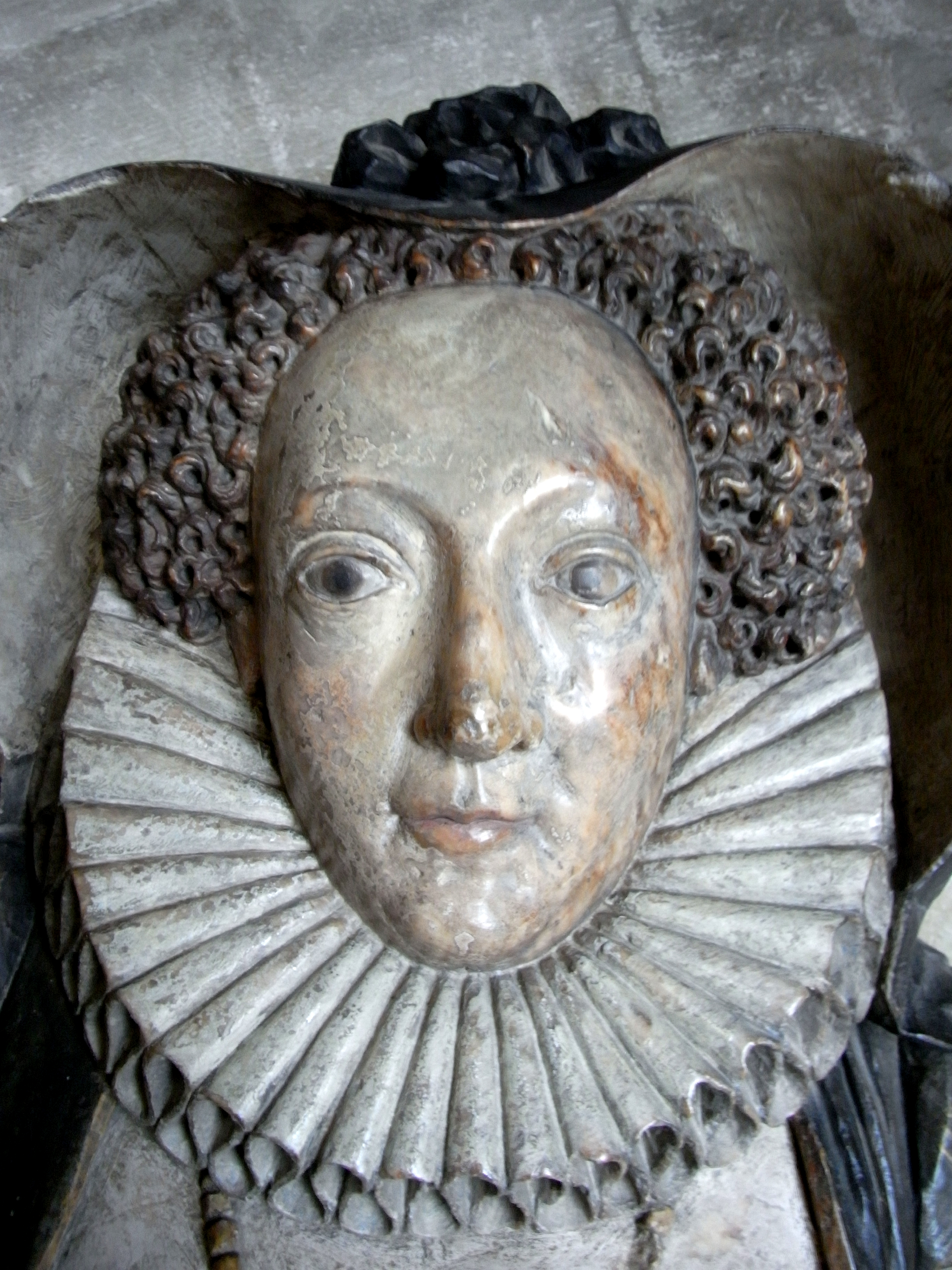
Dorothy Bampfield (died 1617), wife of Edward Hancock (c. 1560–1603), detail from her effigy in the Lady Chapel of Exeter Cathedral

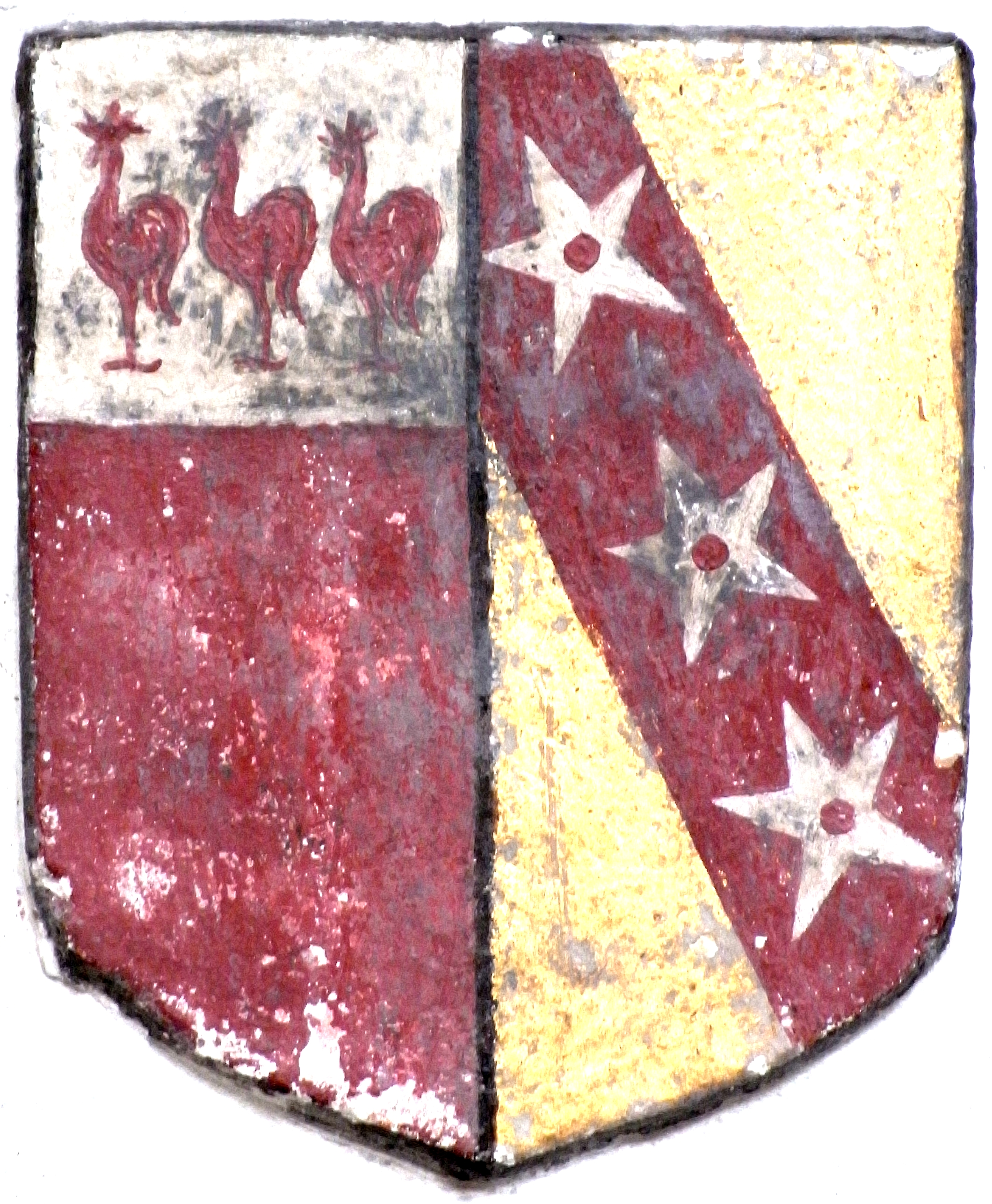
Heraldic escutcheon showing the arms of Hancock of Combe Martin: Gules, on a chief argent three cocks of the field impaling Bampfield of Poltimore: Or, on a bend gules three mullets argent (shown here pierced). Detail from the base of the monument of Dorothy Bampfield (d.1617) in the Lady Chapel of Exeter Cathedral

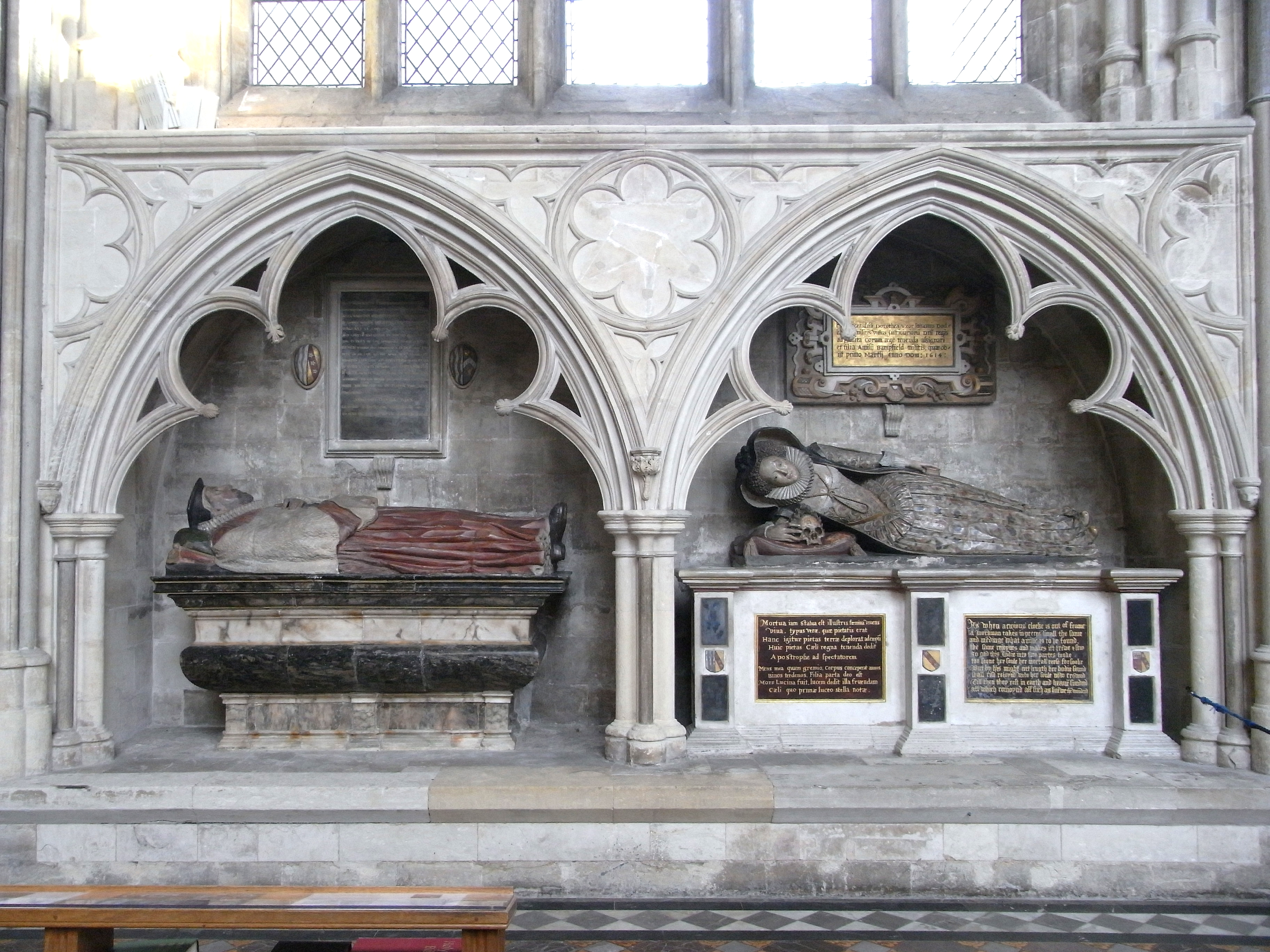
Monuments to the mother and step-father of William Hancock (1602–1625), north wall of Lady Chapel, Exeter Cathedral. Right: Dorothy Bampfield (died 1617), left: Sir John Dodderidge (1555–1628). Above Dorothy's effigy on a tablet within a strapwork surround is the following Latin inscription: "Hic jacet d(omi)na Dorothea uxor Johannis Dioderidge militis unius justiciarioru(m) d(omi)ni regis as placita coram rege tenenda assignati et filia Amisii Bampfield militis quae obiit primo Martii Anno Dom(ini) 1614" ("Here lies Dorothy the wife of John Doderidge, knight, one of the Justices of the Lord King assigned at the Pleas held before the King, and daughter of Amisus (Latinised form) Bampfield, knight, who died on the first of March in the Year of Our Lord 1614")

==== Edward Hancock (c. 1560–1603) ====
Edward Hancock (c. 1560–1603) was the son and heir of William Hancock (died 1587) of Combe Martin. He was MP for Plympton Erle (1593), Barnstaple (1597) and Aldborough (1601). He matriculated at Trinity College, Cambridge in 1578 and entered the Inner Temple c.1580 and was called to the bar in 1590. He was Clerk of Assize on the western circuit in 1590. He married Dorothy Bampfield (died 1614), daughter of Sir Amyas Bampfylde (1560–1626), MP, of Poltimore near Exeter and North Molton in North Devon. Edward Hancock committed suicide on 6 September 1603. He left a one-year-old son and heir William II Hancock (1602–1625). Dorothy survived her husband and received Mount Radford as her dower house, where she lived with her second husband. She remarried to the highly influential Sir John Doddridge (1555–1628), a Justice of the King's Bench, and contemporary of her father, who had purchased as his seat the North Devon estate of Bremridge, near Dorothy's father's seat of North Molton. She was a Maid of Honour to Queen Elizabeth I and has a sumptuous monument to her memory in the Lady chapel of Exeter Cathedral, next to that of Dodderidge.

==== William II Hancock (d.1625) ====
The father of William II Hancock (1602–1625) committed suicide when William was an infant aged one year. His mother, Dorothy Bampfield, then remarried, as his 2nd wife, the highly influential Sir John Doddridge (1555–1628), a Justice of the King's Bench, and contemporary of her father, who had purchased as his seat the estate of Bremridge, near Dorothy's father's seat of North Molton. They had no children. His mother then Lady Dodderidge died in 1617 when William was aged 15 and he appears to have remained in the care of his step-father Dodderidge, who remarried to Anne Culme, the granddaughter of Hugh II Culme (d.1545) of Molland-Champson, a manor adjoining North Molton. Anne thus effectively became William's step-mother. She had previously been married to Gabriel Newman, a member of the Worshipful Company of Goldsmiths in the City of London, to whom she had borne a daughter Judith Newman (1608–1634), who was 6 years william's junior. The Newman (or Neuman) family later were seated at Baconsthorpe in Norfolk, in the parish church of which are some grave-slabs sculpted with the family's arms. At or before her 17th birthday she and the 23-year-old William were married and had two children:

- Anne Hancock, who married Rev. George Cary (1611–1680), of Clovelly, Dean of Exeter and rector of Shobrooke near Crediton. Their son was Sir George Cary (1653-1684/5), MP for Okehampton, whose monument exists in Clovelly Church.
- John Hancock (1625–1661), (see below) son and heir, in the year of whose birth William died, leaving Judith a 17-year-old widow.

At the time of her 1st husband's death in 1625 Sir John Dodderidge and his wife Anne Culme were then still living and presumably had some part in the care of the now fatherless infant. Judith soon remarried to Thomas II Ivatt, but died aged 26 having given birth to a son and heir Thomas III Ivatt, who later resided at Shobrooke near Crediton. Thomas II Ivatt was the eldest son of Thomas I Ivatt (d.1629), who had purchased in 1624 for the sum of £3,000 a lease of the profitable office of "Searcher of the Port of London" the reversion of which he bequeathed in his will to his son Thomas II Ivatt together with the sum of £400 to cover the cost of acquiring a new royal patent. Philipa, The widow of Thomas I Ivatt, of unknown family, was a lunatic, and her wardship was sold by the king in 1629 to the poet Aurelian Townsend (d.1643) They had the following progeny:

- Thomas III Ivatt (d.1691) of Shobrooke.
- Judith Ivatt

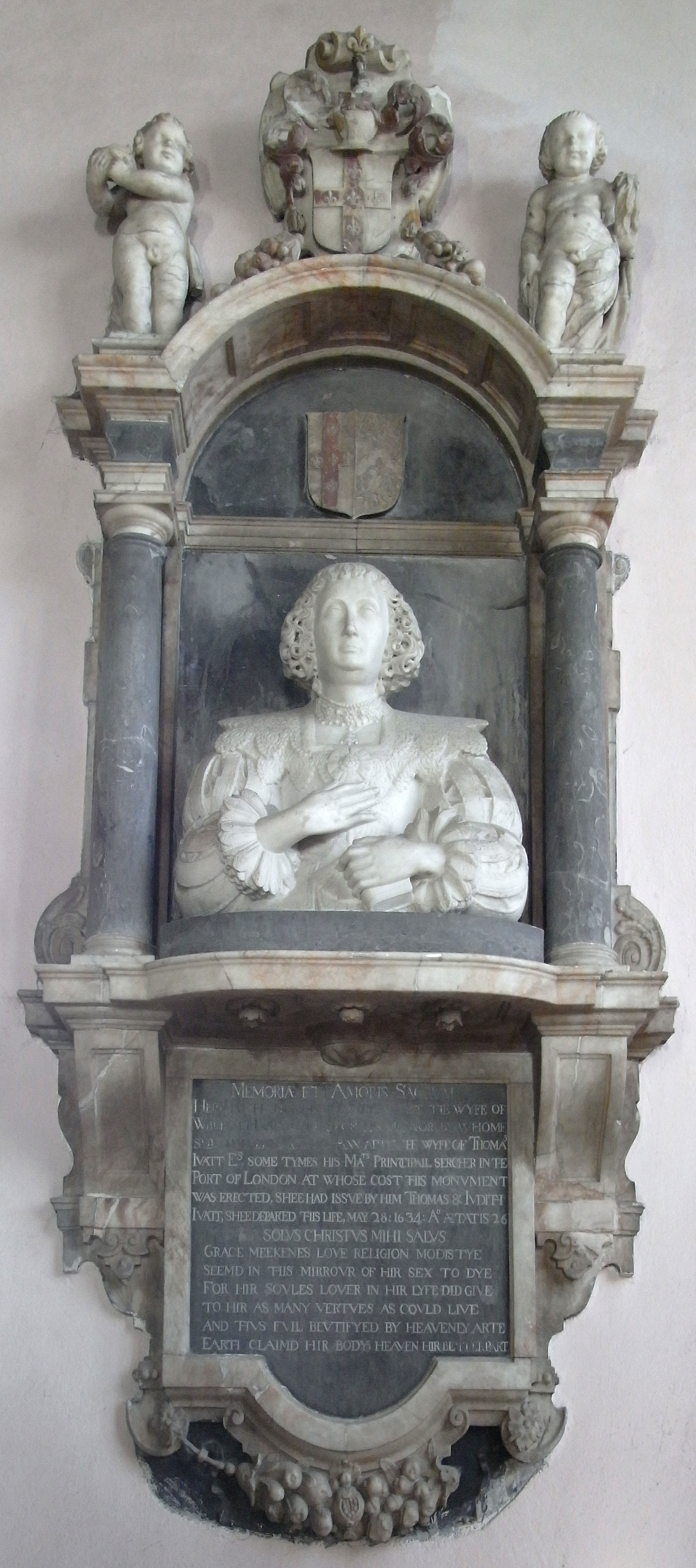
Monument to Judith Newman (1608–1634)firstly wife of William I Hancock (d.1625), secondly of Thomas II Ivatt, Combe Martin Church. Above are displayed within an escutcheon the following arms: Argent, on a cross gules five fleurs-de-lis or (Ivatt) impaling Azure, a chevron wavy between three griffons segreant or (Newman)

Judith's second husband Thomas II Ivatt erected a monument with a bust in white marble of his wife in Combe Martin church, positioned on the north wall of the north aisle chapel above the vestry door. This is similar in design to the contemporary monument to Penelope Noel in Chipping Campden Church, Gloucestershire. It is inscribed thus:

"Memoriae Amoris Sacrum. (Sacred to the memory of Love) Here lyeth the body of Judith first the wyfe of William Hancock Lord of this mannor by whome she had issue John & Ann, after the wyfe of Thomas Ivatt Es(q) some tymes His Ma(jes)t's printcipail sercher in the Port of London at whose cost this monument was erected. Shee had issue by him Thomas & Judith Ivatt. Shee departed this life 28 May 1634 A(nn)o Aetatis 26. (in the year of (her) age 26) Solus Christus mihi salus". (Christ alone is salvation to me)
"Grace meekenes love religion modistye
Seem'd in this mirrour of her sex to dye
For hir soule's lover in hir lyfe did give
To hir as many vertues as could live
And thus full beutifyed by heavenly arte
Earth claim'd hir body Heaven hir better parte"

Judith was buried in the middle of the aisle of this chapel, in the floor of which exists a large sandstone ledger slab inscribed thus:

"Fuimus (We Were) Here lyeth the body of Judith Ivatt wife of Thomas Ivatt Es(q). for whome he lay'd this stone & erected the monument in the north isle of this chancel. Erimus" (We shall be).

==== John Hancock (1625–1661) ====
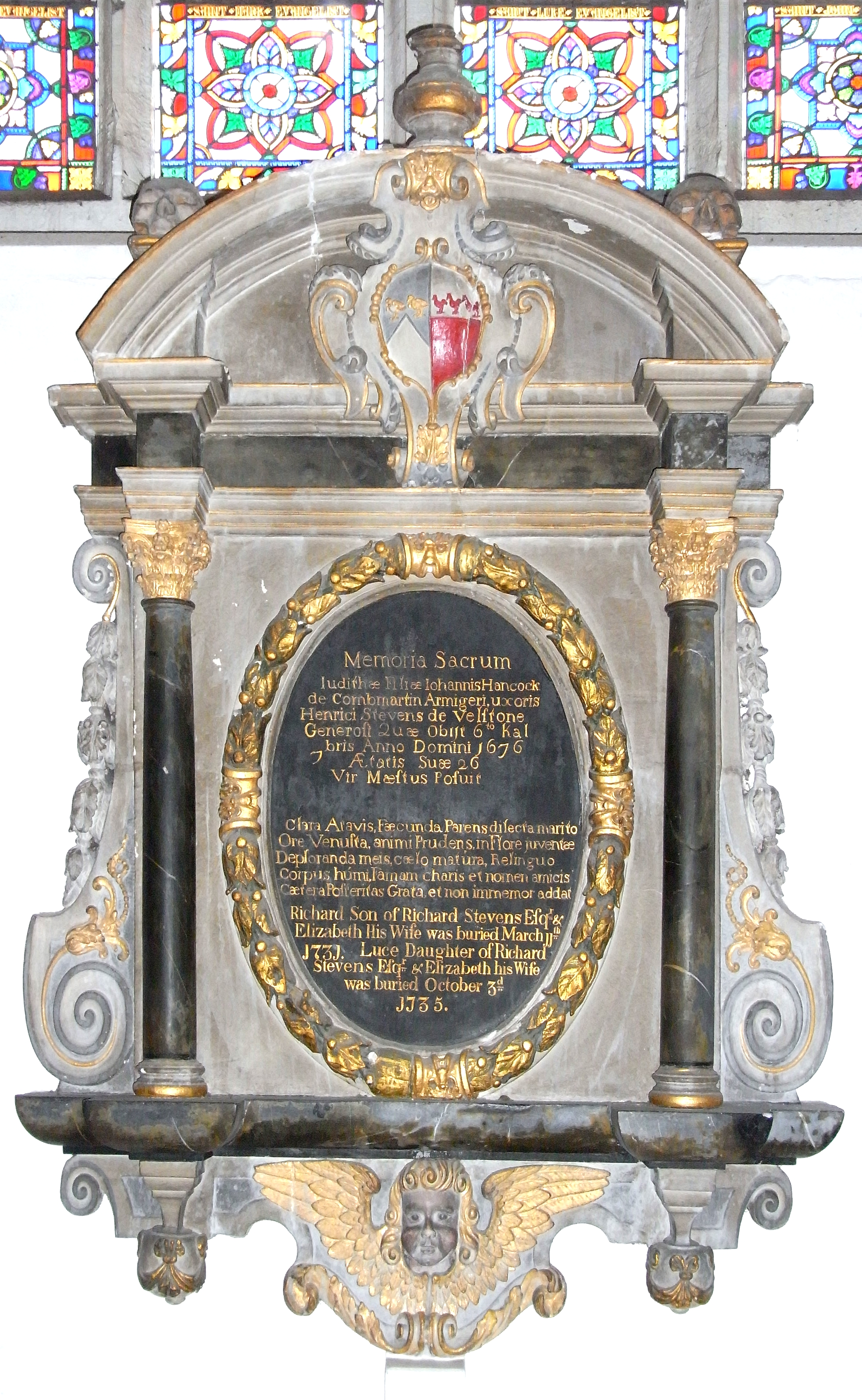
Monument to Judith Hancock (1650–1676), wife of Henry Stevens (1617-post 1675) of Vielstone in the parish of Buckland Brewer, son and heir of William Stevens (d.1648) of Great Torrington. Great Torrington Church, east wall of south aisle

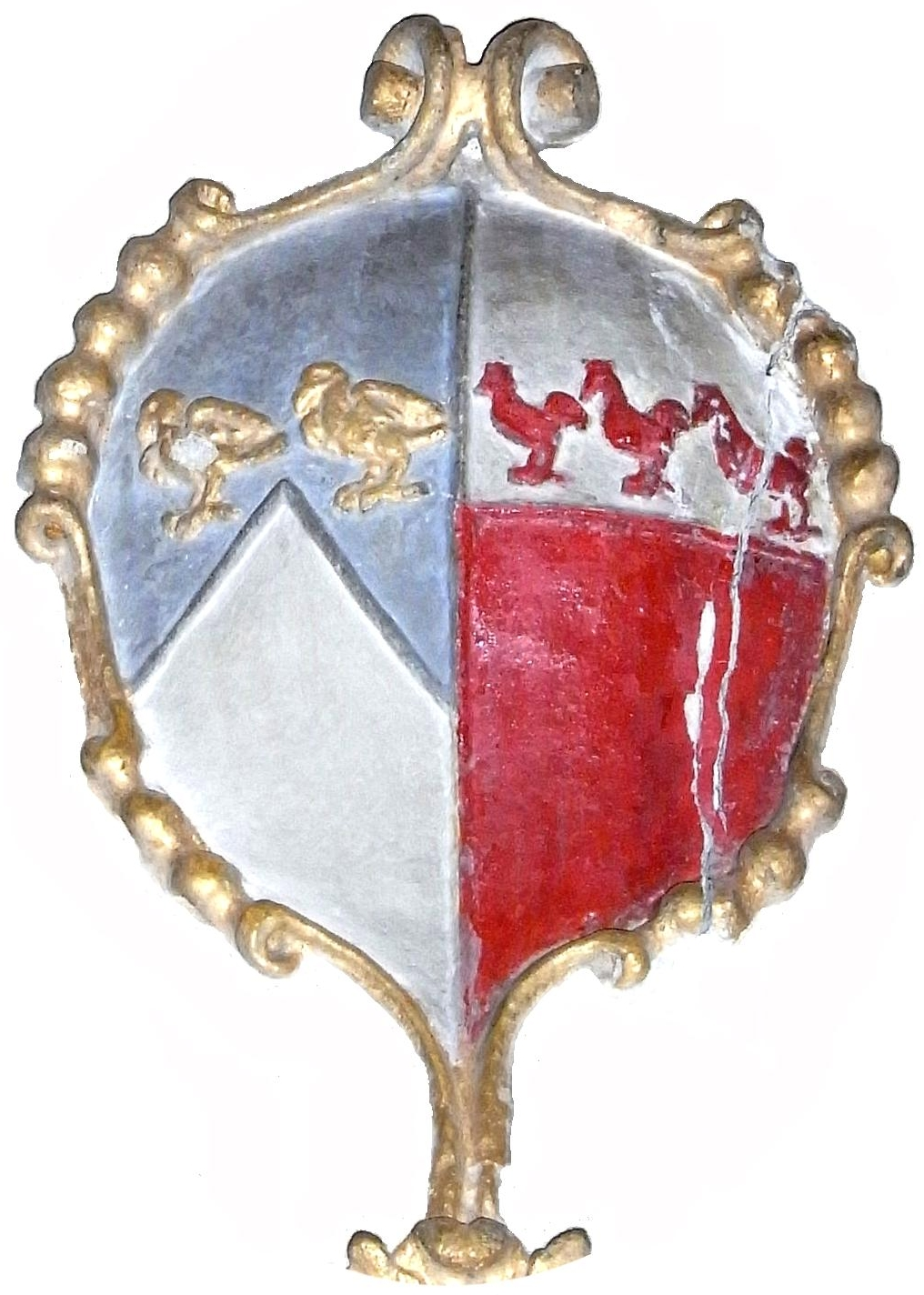
Heraldic escutcheon showing arms of Stevens of Veilstone in the parish of Buckland Brewer (Per chevron azure and argent, in chief two falcons rising or) impaling Hancock of Combe Martin (Gules, on a chief argent three cocks of the field). Detail from mural monument to Judith Hancock (1650–1676), wife of Henry Stevens of Vielstone, east wall of south aisle, Great Torrington Church, Devon

John Hancock (1625–1661), eldest son and heir, who was an infant aged 1 year at his father's death. He became a ward of the king. He married Mary Sainthill, daughter of Peter Sainthill (1596–1648) of Bradninch, by whom he had 3 children:

- Edward Hancock, son and heir
- John Hancock,
- Judith Hancock (1650–1676), who married, as his 2nd wife, Henry Stevens (1617-post 1675) of Vielstone in the parish of Buckland Brewer, eldest son and heir of William Stevens (d.1648) of Great Torrington, apparently a younger son of the Stevens family of Chavenage House, near Tetbury in Gloucestershire. Her mural monument, on which the arms of Stevens (Per chevron azure and argent, in chief two falcons rising or) impale Hancock, exists in Great Torrington Church. The Stevens family later resided at Cross in the parish of Little Torrington and at Winscott in the parish of Peters Marland. They were briefly in the 19th. century the heirs apparent of John Rolle, 1st Baron Rolle (died 1842) of Stevenstone, the largest landowner in Devon. The inscription on the monument is as follows:

Memoria Sacrum Judithae filiae Johannis Hancock de Combmartin, Armigeri, uxoris Henrici Stevens de Velstone, Generosi, quae obiit 6to (sexto) Kal(endae) 7bris (Septembris) Anno Domini 1676 aetatis suae 26. Vir maestus posuit ("Sacred to the memory of Judith, daughter of John Hancock of Combe Martin, Esquire, wife of Henry Stevens of Vielstone, Gentleman, who departed the 6th of the month of September in the Year of Our Lord 1676 of her age 26. Her sorrowful husband erected this").

=== Duck ===
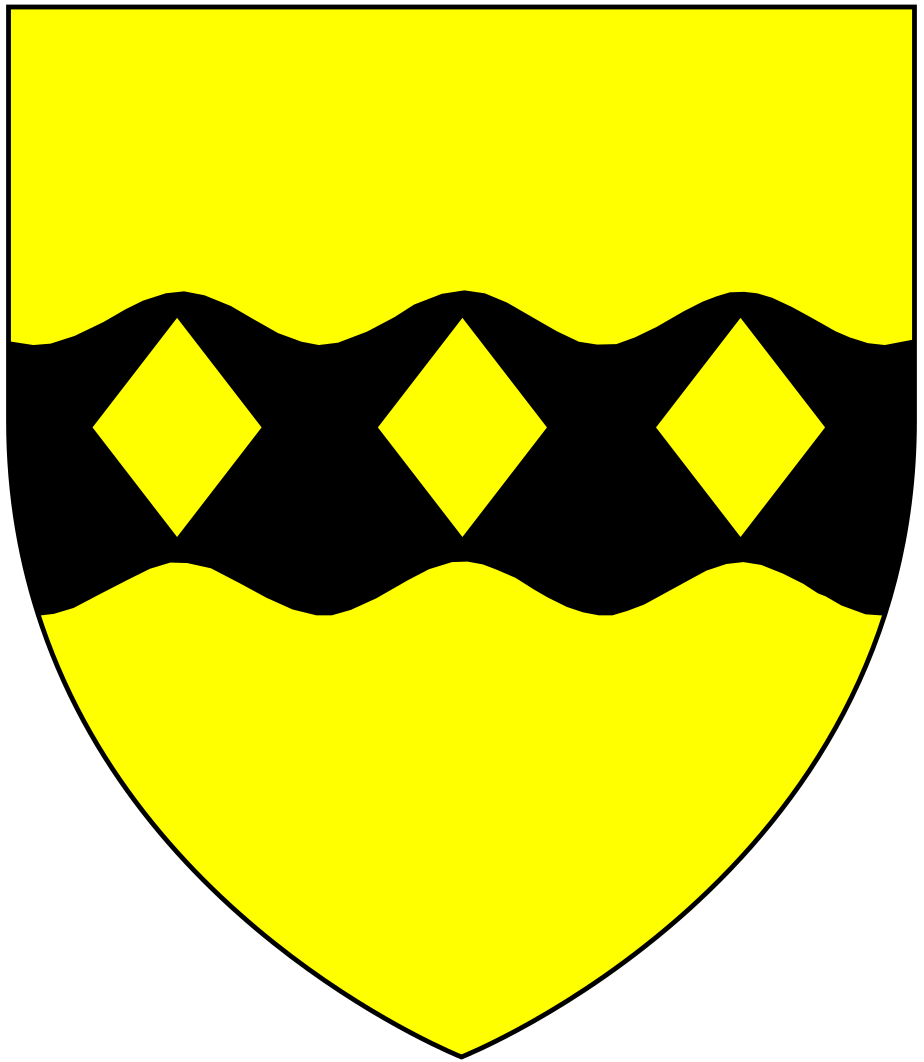
Arms of Duck family: depicted as a gold shield with a wavy black fess containing three gold lozenges, blazoned by J. L. Vivian as Or, on a fess wavy sable three lozenges of the field.

- Nicholas Duck (1570–1628) of the parish of Heavitree, adjacent to St Leonards, Exeter, purchased Mount Radford in 1614. He was a lawyer who served as Recorder of Exeter and twice as a member of parliament for Exeter, in 1624 and 1625. He was one of the Worthies of Devon of the biographer John Prince (1643–1723). His father was Richard Duck (died 1603) of Heavitree who founded "Duck's Almshouses" at Heavitree, still surviving at the intersection of Fore Street and Butts Road, having been rebuilt in 1853.
- Richard Duck (1603–1656), eldest son and heir. During the Civil War Mount Radford House and the parish church of St Leonard's were fortified by the Royalists in defence of the City of Exeter. He married Bridget Drewe, daughter of Sir Thomas Drewe (died 1651) of The Grange, Broadhembury, Devon, Sheriff of Devon in 1612, who sold Killerton to Sir Arthur Acland. (Son of Edward Drew (c. 1542–1598) of Killerton, Broadclyst and The Grange, Broadhembury, Devon, a Serjeant-at-Law to Queen Elizabeth I who served as a member of parliament for Lyme Regis in 1584, twice for Exeter in 1586 and 1588 and, in 1592, for the City of London and was Recorder of the City of London).
- Nicholas II Duck (1630–1667), eldest son and heir, who married his cousin Martha Duck (died 1674), eldest daughter and co-heiress of his great-uncle the "vastly rich" Sir Arthur Duck (1580–1649), a Doctor of Civil Law, a Royalist in the Civil War, MP for Minehead in Somerset and an author of several works. she survived her husband and remarried to Sir Thomas Carew, 1st Baronet (1632–1673) of Haccombe, Devon. One of his daughters, Margaret Duck, married Edward II Mansel of Henllys, near Llanddewi, on the Gower Peninsula in Glamorgan, Wales. The senior line was seated at Margam Abbey (see Mansel Baronets and Baron Mansel) which family had played a major role in the early settlement of Gower. Edward II Mansel was the son and heir of Edward I Mansel (d. 1695). The Mansel family suffered financial problems and, in 1699, Mrs. Mansel (Margaret Duck), widow of Edward II, petitioned Parliament for a special settlement of her affairs. In a letter to Mr. Thomas Drew, "probably a lawyer", (probably her cousin Thomas Drewe (1635–1707) of The Grange), she stated that Mr. Mansels father "left a great incumbrance on the estate".
- Richard II Duck (1657–1695), eldest son and heir, who in Exeter Cathedral married Elizabeth Acland (died 1723), eldest daughter and co-heiress of John II Acland (1615–1674), Mayor of Exeter. John II Acland's father was John I Acland (died 1641), also Mayor of Exeter, and a grandson of Anthony Acland (died 1568) of Hawkridge, Chittlehampton, Devon, a junior branch of the ancient family of Acland of Acland, Landkey in North Devon, the senior branch of which became the Acland Baronets of Killerton, major landowners in the Westcountry. Elizabeth's sister and co-heiress Margery Acland was the wife of Richard's brother, Arthur Duck, LL.D. (died 1702). The union was childless.

=== Colesworthy ===
John Colesworthy was the owner of the estate in 1755 when he was declared bankrupt and sold the house with 17 acres of land to John Baring (1730–1816) for 2,000 guineas.

=== Baring ===
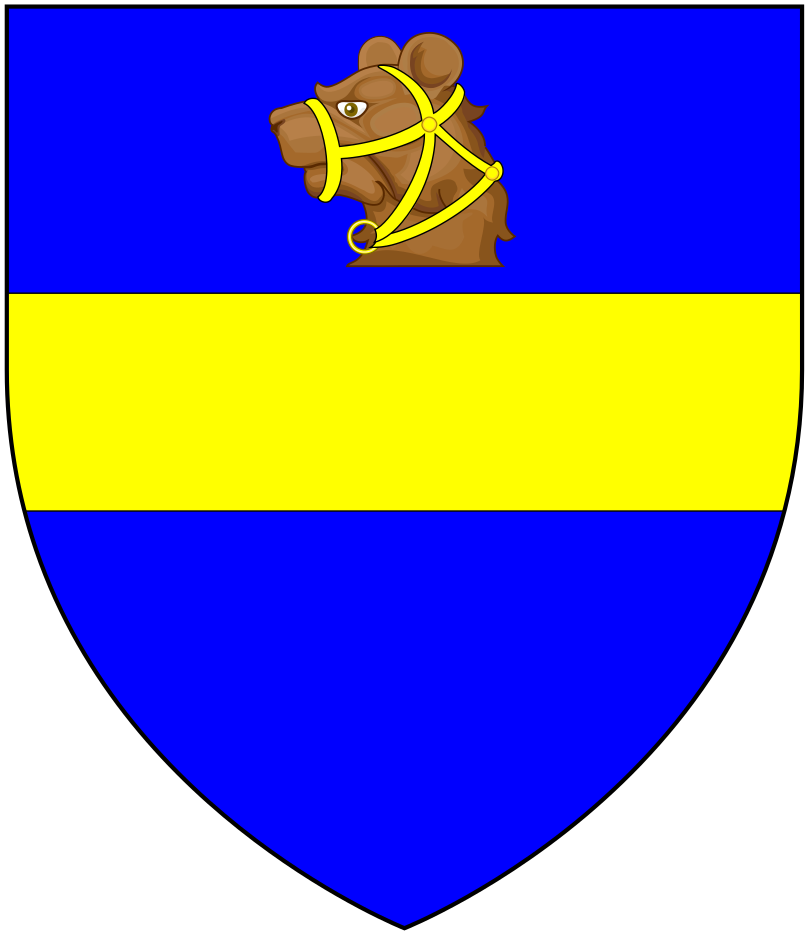
Canting arms of Baring: Azure, a fesse or in chief a bear's head proper muzzled and ringed of the second

Mount Radford was next acquired by the Baring family, substantial local merchants and bankers who founded the international banking house of Baring Brothers.

- John Baring (1730–1816), MP, merchant and banker, in 1755 purchased for £2,100 the estate of Mount Radford, adjacent to his father's residence of Larkbeare. He also purchased the adjoining manors of Heavitree and Wonford. He rebuilt the 16th century house in the modern Georgian style and added a carriage drive from Magdalen Street, lined with cedar trees. The course of the carriage drive is today represented by St Leonards Road.

In 1810, he had an additional residence at West Teignmouth House in the parish of West Teignmouth. In 1816, the last year of his life, he encountered financial difficulties and sold Mount Radford and his other Exeter properties to his cousin Sir Thomas Baring, 2nd Baronet (1772–1848), who in 1826 sold them to a commercial builder. A memorial to members of the Baring family of Mount Radford and Larkbeare exists in the late Victorian (1876–86) St Leonard's Church on Holloway Street, which replaced the small classical church built in about 1831 (enlarged in 1843 for £800, of which £500 was donated by Sir Thomas Baring), which itself replaced the mediaeval parish church.

=== Mount Radford School ===
In 1826 the house became a school, known variously as "Mount Radford School", "The Exeter Public School" or "Mount Radford College". The school remained extant in nearby buildings after Mount Radford House was demolished in 1902.

==== Sale of land ====
In 1832 the horticulturalist James Veitch (1792–1863), who worked for the Aclands of Killerton, purchased 25 acres of land on the estate.

=== Demolition and development ===
In 1902 the house was demolished and the grounds were used for housing development now forming part of the eastern suburbs of Exeter. The area is now covered by Barnardo Road and Cedars Road.
