= Exeter by-election =

Exeter by-election may refer to:

- 1868 Exeter by-election
- 1873 Exeter by-election
- 1916 Exeter by-election
- 1918 Exeter by-election
