= William Frye (disambiguation) =

William Frye may refer to:

- William P. Frye (1830–1911), American politician from Maine
- William Frye (painter) (1822–1872), German-born American painter
- William Frye (producer) (1921–2017), American producer
- William F. Frye (1929–1988), American attorney and politician from Oregon
- William Frye (MP) (died 1427), English politician
- William P. Frye (1901), a sailing ship

== See also ==
- Sen. William P. Frye House, a historic home in Lewiston, Maine
- William Fry (disambiguation)
