= Nicholas Duck =

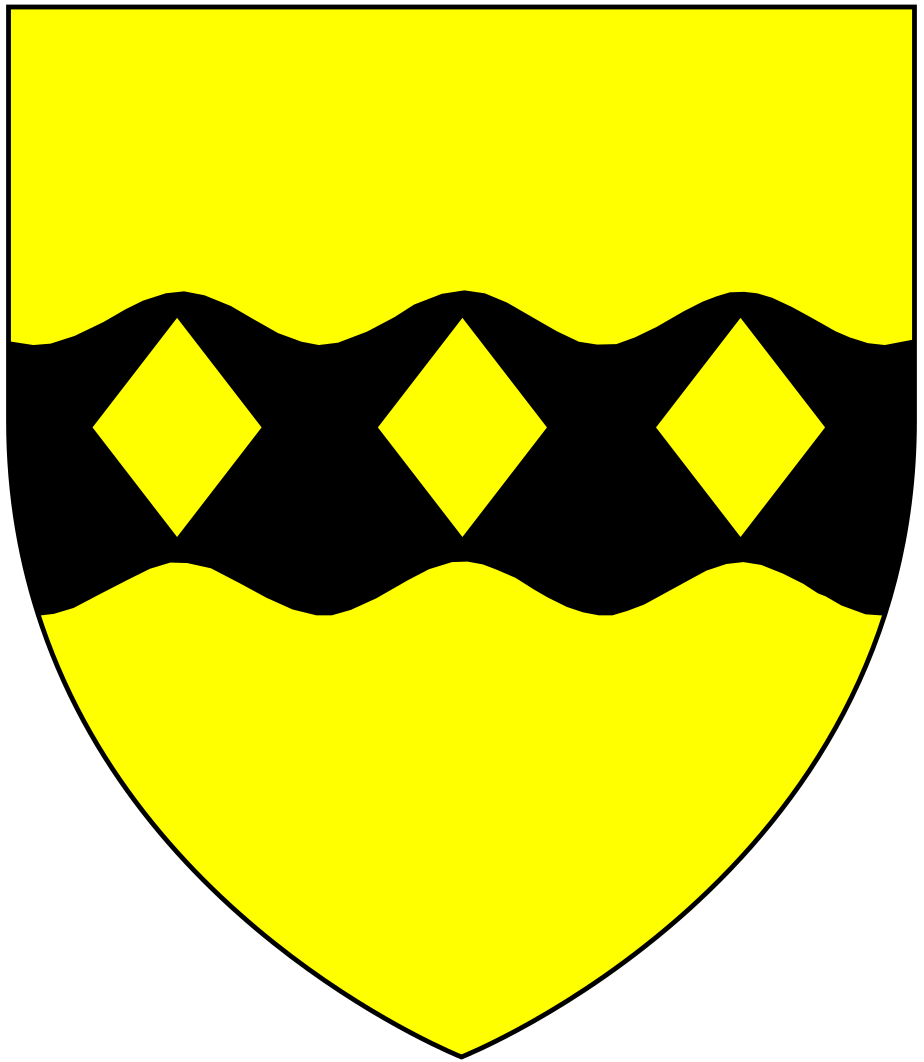
Arms of Duck: Or, on a fess wavy sable three lozenges of the field

Nicholas Duck (1570 – 28 August 1628), of Heavitree and of nearby Mount Radford in the parish of St Leonards, both next to Exeter in Devonshire, was an English lawyer who served twice as a Member of Parliament for Exeter, in 1624 and 1625. He was one of the Worthies of Devon of the biographer John Prince (1643–1723), whose wife was his great-niece.

== Origins ==
He was born in 1570 at Heavitree, the eldest son of Richard Duck (d.1603) by his wife a certain Joanna (d.1624). Richard Duck was the founder of "Duck's Almhouse" in Heavitree. His brother was the "vastly rich" Sir Arthur Duck (1580-1649), a Doctor of Civil Law, a Royalist in the Civil War, MP for Minehead in Somerset and an author of several works.

== Career ==
On 12 July 1584 he entered Exeter College, Oxford, popular with Devonians, founded by Hugh Oldham (c.1452-1519), Bishop of Exeter. He left the university without a degree, and entered Lincoln's Inn, where he commenced his legal training, and of which he was one of the governors from 1615 until his death. He was called to the bar. In 1614 he purchased the mansion house and estate of Mount Radford in the parish of St Leonards, Exeter, which he made his seat. He was Reader at Lincoln's Inn in Lent 1618, and the same year was elected to the honourable position of Recorder of Exeter. He gave £5 towards the building of Lincoln's Inn Chapel in 1617.

== Marriage and children ==
On 6 October 1601 at St. Mary Arches, Exeter, he married Grace Walker, daughter of Thomas Walker of Exeter, Alderman and Mayor of Exeter, by whom he had four children:

- Richard Duck (1603–1656) of Mount Radford, St Leonard's, Exeter, who married Bridget Drewe, daughter of Sir Thomas Drewe (d.1651) of The Grange, Broadhembury, Devon, Sheriff of Devon in 1612, who sold Killerton to Sir Arthur Acland. (Son of Edward Drew (c.1542–1598) of Killerton, Broadclyst and The Grange, Broadhembury, Devon, a Serjeant-at-Law to Queen Elizabeth I who served as a Member of Parliament for Lyme Regis in 1584, twice for Exeter in 1586 and 1588 and in 1592 for the City of London and was Recorder of the City of London)
- Philip Duck (d. 1666/7), who married Mary Osborne;
- Charles Duck;
- William Duck (d. 1627).

== Death and burial ==
He died on 28 August 1628 and was buried in Exeter Cathedral on 9 September 1628. His portrait is said to exist in the collection of Exeter Guildhall.

== Sources ==
- Vivian, Lt.Col. J.L., (Ed.) The Visitations of the County of Devon: Comprising the Heralds' Visitations of 1531, 1564 & 1620, Exeter, 1895, pp. 309–10, pedigree of Duck
- Prince, John, (1643–1723) The Worthies of Devon, 1810 edition, London, pp. 338–41, Duck, Nicholas
