= John Shapleigh =

John Shapleigh may refer to:

- John Shapleigh (died 1414), MP for Exeter
- John Shapleigh (fl. 1414–1427), MP for Exeter
