= Ignatius Jordain =

English merchant and politician

Ignatius Jordain (1561 – 15 July 1640) was an English merchant and politician who sat in the House of Commons between 1621 and 1629.

== Biography ==
Jordain was born at Lyme Regis, the son of William Jordain and his wife Elizabeth Ryder. He was baptised at Lyme Regis on 17 August 1561. When he was young he was sent by his friends to Exeter, to be brought up as merchant. In 1576, his employer sent him to Guernsey, where he was converted to puritanism. In 1599 he was appointed bailiff of Exeter. He became a member of the corporation in 1608 and was receiver of Exeter in 1610 and Sheriff of Exeter in 1611. In 1617 he became mayor of Exeter. He was also J.P. for 24 years. In 1621, he was elected Member of Parliament for Exeter. He was deputy mayor in 1624 when all the magistrates fled the city because of the plague. He was re-elected MP for Exeter in 1625, 1626 and 1628 and sat until 1629 when King Charles decided to rule without parliament for eleven years. In parliament, Jourdain succeeded in having bills passed penalising adultery, Sabbath-breaking and swearing.

Jordain was a devout puritan. He was said to have read the Bible at least 20 times and Acts and Monuments seven times. He attempted to introduce temperance legislation and was considered the scourge of the alehouses in Exeter. When the proclamation regarding rebellious practices in Scotland was read in Exeter Cathedral in 1639, he was one of three men who put their hats on in protest. Jordain was also indifferent to worldly wealth and proud of his humble origins. He claimed " I came, but with a six-pence in my purse to this city; if I had had a shilling in my purse, I had never been mayor of Exeter". He dismissed threats of lawsuits that would leave him with a groat by saying that would be only two pence less than he had when he arrived in the city.

Jordain died at the age of 79 and was buried on 18 June 1640.

== Family ==
Jordan married firstly Katherine Bodley daughter of John Bodley on 24 June 1589. She died on 4 May 1593 and he married secondly Elizabeth Baskerville sister of Sir Simon Baskerville on 5 August 1593. He had three daughters by his first wife and fourteen children by his second. His cousin, John Jourdain, became president of the East India Company's Council in India.

Parliament of England
Preceded by John Prowse; Thomas Martyn	Member of Parliament for Exeter; 1621–1622; With: John Prowse	Succeeded by John Prowse; Nicholas Duck
Preceded by John Prowse; Nicholas Duck	Member of Parliament for Exeter; 1625–1629; With: Nicholas Duck 1625; John Haynes 1626; John Lynn 1628–1629	Parliament suspended until 1640
