= Cobbley =

Cobbley may refer to:

- Cobbley, character in The Mouse That Roared (film)
- Robert Cobbley, MP
- Uncle Tom Cobley, a British figure of speech
