= Roger Gold =

Roger Gold may refer to:

- Roger Golde (died 1429), English politician

== See also ==
- Gold Roger, fictional character
