= Hamlin (surname) =

Hamlin is a surname. Notable people with the surname include:

- Alan Hamlin (born 1951), British economist and political theorist
- Catherine Hamlin (1924–2020), obstetrician and hospital founder
- Charles Sumner Hamlin (1861–1938), American lawyer and politician, first Federal Reserve Chairman
- Cicero J. Hamlin (1819–1905), American businessman and horse breeder
- Courtney W. Hamlin (1858–1950), U.S. Representative from Missouri
- Cyrus Hamlin (general) (1839–1867), Civil War general
- Cyrus Hamlin (missionary) (1811–1900), missionary and educator
- Damar Hamlin (born 1998), American football player
- Denny Hamlin, (born 1980), American race car driver
- Doug Hamlin, CEO of the National Rifle Association
- Ebenezer Hamlin (1844–1900), New Zealand politician
- Edward S. Hamlin (1808–1894), U.S. Representative from Ohio
- Erin Hamlin (born 1986), American luger
- Fanny Hamlin (born 1987), Swedish singer
- Gene Hamlin (1946–2017), National Football League center
- Hannibal Hamlin (1809–1891), Vice President of the U.S. under Abraham Lincoln
- Hannibal E. Hamlin (1858–1938), Attorney General of Maine and son of Hannibal Hamlin
- Harry Hamlin (born 1951), American actor
- Henry Hamlin (1484–1549/1550), English politician
- Howland J. Hamlin (1850–1909), American lawyer
- Jabez Hamlin (1709–1791), Connecticut politician and judge
- Jean Hamlin (fl 1682–1684), French pirate
- John Austen Hamlin, co-originator with Lysander Hamlin of Hamlin's Wizard Oil
- Ken Hamlin (born 1981), American football safety
- Ken Hamlin (baseball) (born 1935), Major League Baseball infielder
- Lawrence B. Hamlin, grandson of Lysander Hamilin and convicted of violating the U.S. 1906 Pure Food and Drug Act for claims about Hamlin's Wizard Oil
- Luke Hamlin (1904–1978), Major League Baseball pitcher
- Lysander Hamlin, co-originator with John Austen Hamlin of Hamlin's Wizard Oil
- Rosie Hamlin (1945–2017), American singer and songwriter
- Sally Hamlin (1902–1987), child actor and recording artist
- Shelley Hamlin (1949–2018), American professional golfer
- Simon M. Hamlin (1866–1939), U.S. Representative from Maine
- V. T. Hamlin (1900–1993), creator of the comic strip Alley Oop
- Walter B. Hamlin (1898–1984), Justice of the Louisiana Supreme Court
