= Goscombe =

Goscombe may refer to:

- John Goscombe
- Goscombe John
