= John Wilford (disambiguation) =

John Wilford was a bookseller.

John Wilford may also refer to:

- John Wilford (MP)
- John Noble Wilford (1933–2025), American author and science journalist
- John Wilford, the secretary of the Libertarian National Committee since 2021
