= Shapleigh (disambiguation) =

Shapleigh is a town in Maine.

Shapleigh may also refer to:

- Augustus Shapleigh (1810-1902), American businessman
- Bertram Shapleigh (1871–1940), American composer
- Eliot Shapleigh (born 1952), American politician
- Frank Henry Shapleigh (1842-1906), American painter
- John Shapleigh (disambiguation)
