= Creedy =

Creedy is a surname. Notable people with the surname include:

- Adam Creedy (fl. 1388), English politician
- Pat Creedy (1927–2011), New Zealand rugby player
- Rebecca Creedy (born 1983), Australian swimmer

== See also ==
- Creedy, Sandford, historic estate in Devon, England
- River Creedy
