= Coscombe =

Coscombe may refer to:

- John Coscombe
- Lower Coscombe
