= John Pasmore =

John Pasmore (by 1505–44), of Sutton in Halberton, Devon and Lions Inn, London, was an English lawyer and Member of Parliament (MP).

He was a Member of the Parliament of England for Exeter in 1542.
