= John Grey (Devon MP) =

English politician

John Grey (died 1413) of Exeter, Devon, was an English politician.

He was a Member (MP) of the Parliament of England for Exeter in 1366, October 1377, January 1380, 1385, 1386, 1391, 1393, 1394, 1395 and January 1397; for Barnstaple in 1385 and Totnes in 1391.

For nearly 50 years Grey was a leading member of the government of Exeter; he was an elector of the civic officers almost every year between 1366 and 1412 and continually influenced the affairs of the city as a councillor or official. His local standing was based not only on a flourishing export trade in woollen cloth, but also on his skills as a goldsmith. In 1364 he went surety for a fellow merchant, Roger Plenty†, when the latter undertook to export wool to Gascony and bring back wine in exchange; and it was with Plenty that he was indicted for fraud in the collection of customs at Exeter three years later. In 1373 Grey shared the marriage of a local heiress, Joan Aleyn of Wonford, who, however, was abducted from her guardians. Six years later he was granted at the Exchequer the farm of the subsidies due for collection on all goods except wool, woolfells and hides passing through the ports of Devon and Cornwall, and in 1380 (during the first Parliament of the year) the farm, now to be shared with the other Exeter representative on that occasion, John Talbot, was extended for six years. The same two men were appointed shortly afterwards to collect the ‘ancient custom’ on wool. Grey made further appearances in the Exchequer in 1380 and 1383 to provide securities for the lessees of the manors of East Luccombe (Somerset) and Sheepwash (Devon).4 One of his closest associates was Robert Wilford†, many times mayor of Exeter in this period: in August 1384 they were appointed by the Crown to levy in Devon and Cornwall various sums adjudged forfeit in the court of admiralty before Edward Courtenay, earl of Devon, in the capacity of admiral of the west, and to deliver them to the earl; both Grey and Wilford were among the ‘esquires’ who wore Courtenay’s livery in 1384-5; and it was with Wilford that Grey travelled to London in 1388-9 and 1395-6 on the business of the city of Exeter.5

Since in 1385 Grey was returned to Parliament for both Exeter and Barnstaple, he may well have been the man of this name who in earlier years had rented an area of pasture from the latter commonalty. Similarly, in 1391 he sat for both Exeter and Totnes, having some residential qualification in the latter town as a feoffee and, from 1380, owner of property there.6 In March 1403 he was granted custody of the estates of St. James’s priory near Exeter for the duration of the war with France, but on a more permanent basis he held a sizeable estate in the city, including a messuage, ten shops, ten solars, three cellars and a stable in the parish of St. George. As a consequence of his marriage he had come into possession of a house in North Street (which he sold in 1379 to the dowager countess of Devon) and six acres of land near St. David’s Hill. Grey also held over 50 acres of farmland worth 40s.a year in Broad Clyst, as a tenant of the earls of Salisbury, but lost possession from 1400 to 1406 because of the 8th earl’s attainder and the forfeiture of his estates. Grey seems to have favoured the friars before other religious orders: in 1384 a brother of the local Dominican house had been excommunicated by Bishop Brantingham for administering the eucharist to him without licence.7
