= John Prescott (died 1412) =

English politician

John Prescott (c. 1327 – 1412), of Prescott, Rake and Exeter, Devon, was an English politician.

He was a Member (MP) of the Parliament of England for Exeter in 1361, 1363, 1365, and 1368, for Totnes in 1366, 1372 and 1373, and for Devon in November 1390.
