= Adam Golde =

English politician

Adam Golde (died 1395/6), of Exeter, Devon, was an English politician.

== Family ==
He married a woman named Margery and they had four daughters and one son, the MP, Roger Golde.

== Career ==
He was a member (MP) of the parliament of England for Exeter in January 1390.
