= William Morehay =

English politician

William Morehay (fl. 1402–1407) of Exeter, Devon, was an English politician.

He was a member (MP) of the parliament of England for Exeter in 1402 and 1407.
