= John Nywaman =

English politician

John Nywaman (fl. 1404) of Exeter, Devon, was an English politician.

== Family ==
Nywaman married a woman named Agnes.

== Career ==
He was a member (MP) of the parliament of England for Exeter in 1404.
