= William Fry =

William Fry may refer to:

- W. A. Fry (1872–1944), Canadian sport administrator and newspaper publisher
- William Henry Fry (1813–1864), American composer
- William Fry (Victorian politician) (1909–2000), Australian politician of Higinbotham Province, Victoria
- William Fry (Tasmanian politician) (1912–1965), Australian politician of Launcestion, Tasmania
- William Mayes Fry (1896–1992), World War I flying ace
- William Thomas Fry (1789–1843), British engraver
- William Fry (British Army officer) (1858–1934), Lieutenant Governor of the Isle of Man
- William H. Fry (1830–1929), wood carver and gilder
- William F. Fry (1921–2011), American physicist

== See also ==
- William Frye (disambiguation)
- Will Fries (born 1998), American football offensive guard
