= Richard Crese =

English politician

Richard Crese (fl. 1415–1420) of Exeter, Devon, was an English politician.

== Family ==
He was married to Alice.

== Career ==
He was a member (MP) of the parliament of England for Exeter in 1415 and 1420.
