= John Wilford (MP) =

English politician

John Wilford (died 1418) of Exeter, Devon, was an English politician.

== Family ==
Wilford was the brother of William Wilford, MP. Son of Robert Wilford

== Career ==
He was a member (MP) of the parliament of England for Exeter in April 1414 and November 1414.
