= Thomas Cook (MP for Exeter) =

Member of the Parliament of England for Exeter

Thomas Cook (fl. 1417–1442) of Exeter, Devon, was an English politician.

== Family ==
He was the son of the MP, John Cook.

== Career ==
He was a member (MP) of the parliament of England for Exeter in 1417, 1435, 1437, 1439 and 1442.
