= Peter Hadley =

English politician

Peter Hadley (fl. 1377–1388) of Exeter, was an English politician.

He was a member (MP) of the parliament of England for Exeter in January 1377, 1378, November 1384, February 1388 and September 1388, for Plympton Erle in 1371 and September 1388, and for Tavistock in 1381.
