= William Dimmock =

English politician

William Dimmock (fl. 1406) was an English politician.

== Family ==
Dimmock had a wife named Cecily and one son.

== Career ==
He was a member (MP) of the parliament of England for Exeter in 1406.
