= William Hurst (MP) =

William Hurst (by 1484-1568), of Exeter, Devon, was an English merchant and Member of Parliament (MP). Hurst was a bailiff of the City of Exeter in 1512 and 1522.

== Public service ==
He was Mayor of Exeter for six terms, first in 1523, taking over after the death of the incumbent John Simon and re-elected the following year. He then returned to the position in 1535, 1545, 1551 and 1561.

He was a Member of the Parliament of England for Exeter in 1539, 1542 and 1545.

== Almshouses ==
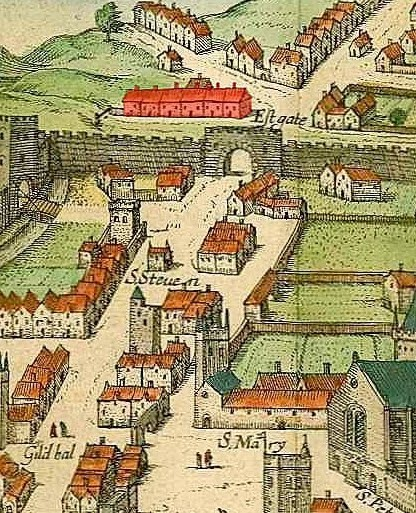
Hurst's Almshouses, highlighted in red, painted by Braun and Hogenburg, outside the East Gate of the city

In his will (of 1552), Hurst gave six tenement houses in the Parish of Alhallows on the Walls, and a further six tenements on St Mary Arches, for the use of poor people.

The Hurst Almshouses in Allhallows were to the exterior of the city wall, near the East Gate. The gate was demolished in 1784, and the buildings near the wall were in poor repair, as noted in a House of Commons report in 1834.

The site of the almshouses was later used for the Devon and Exeter Subscription Rooms, and were demolished in 1819, being replaced by twelve new almshouses in Belgrave Road. There were arguments at the city council as to whether Hurst had the right to endow the almshouses in perpetuity.
