= John Hannam =

British politician (1929–2026)

Sir John Hannam

Member of Parliament for Exeter
- In office 18 June 1970 – 8 April 1997
- Preceded by: Gwyneth Dunwoody
- Succeeded by: Ben Bradshaw

Personal details
- Born: 2 August 1929
- Died: 8 October 2026 (aged 97)
- Party: Conservative
- Spouse(s): Wendy Lamont Macartney (1956–1983), Vanessa Hannam (1983–2020)

Sir John Gordon Hannam (2 August 1929 – 8 October 2026) was a British Conservative Party politician. He was the last Conservative MP for Exeter to date, from 1970 until his retirement in 1997.

== Early life ==
Hannam attended Yeovil Grammar School, where he matriculated. He served in the army, where he completed his National Service in the Middle East, and then in the Territorial Army. A keen sportsman, Hannam played hockey and tennis for Somerset, and was Singles Champion in 1953. Later, in Parliament, he captained the Lords and Commons Tennis and Ski Teams, and was a Member of the All England Lawn Tennis and International Clubs.

== Business ==
Hannam built up his own business in Tourism and Hotels in the West Country which led him to maintain a strong interest in Small Businesses throughout his Parliamentary career. He was a member of the English Tourist Board and President of the British Motels Federation 1967–1980.

== Parliamentary career ==
Hannam won the marginal Exeter seat from Gwyneth Dunwoody in 1970 and held it through seven general elections.

Once in Parliament he helped to launch the first backbench Energy and Small Businesses Committees and organized visits to coalmines, oil rigs and nuclear power stations as well as visits to research establishments in France and USA. He was elected Chairman of the Conservative Energy Committee 1974–1992. He was elected Secretary of the Conservative 1922 Committee, a position he held 1987–1997.

His interest in the arts stemmed from a love of music and singing (training as a singer and commanding several leading roles in light opera in his 20s) and he was elected Chairman of the Bow Group Arts Committee and Vice-Chairman of the Conservative Arts Committee. In 1980 the Government appointed him as a Trustee-Director of the National Theatre, where he was one of the longest serving members.

In 1989 he became a trustee-director of a newly created opera training company named British Youth Opera and took over chairmanship in 1997. Over a thousand young opera singers have developed their professional careers following training by BYO.

He stood down after 27 years in Parliament at the 1997 election. He disassociated himself from the bitter, homophobic campaign of his Conservative successor Adrian Rogers, who was a leading member of the religious right. For this he received praise from his successor, Labour's Ben Bradshaw, during his maiden speech in Parliament.

=== Disability rights ===
The other main interest John Hannam developed in his 27 years in Parliament was as a leading campaigner for disability rights and the promotion of legislation to provide opportunities in education, employment, access to buildings and transport for people with disabilities. He was elected an officer of the All Party Disablement Group in 1974 and chairman from 1987 to 1997. He was appointed to the Government Transport Advisory Committee, the Snowdon Working Party on Disability, The Access Committee for England and Deputy Chairman of Rehabilitation International.

As a Council Member of Action Research he was a founder member of the Snowdon Trust which was created to financially assist severely physically disabled students in higher education and served as chairman from 1997 – 2012. He was also a vice-president.

As part of the campaign for anti-discrimination he initiated several debates in the Commons and took a leading role in the passage of the Government 1995 Act which created the platform for many advances subsequently achieved.

Hannam was involved for many years with the Alzheimers Society and was later a vice-president. He was also a vice-president of the Disabled Motorists Association.

=== Private Members Bills ===
In 1986 John Hannam piloted his own Private Members Bill – The Corneal Tissue Act – through all stages and so made it possible for a thousand more people to retain their sight.

Then he followed in 1993 with another Bill to allow Disabled Drivers to become Driving Instructors. In 1995 he succeeded in passing a third Bill – The Proceeds of Crime Act – which enabled the Courts to recover the ill-gotten gains from criminal actions.

== Personal life and death ==
In 1956 he married Wendy Lamont Macartney and had two daughters. He divorced in 1983, and married Vanessa Wauchope née Anson later that year. They divorced in 2020.

Hannam died on 8 October 2026, aged 97.

== Honours ==
In 1986 Hannam was awarded the honorary degree of Master of the University by the Open University for services to the disabled. In 1994 he received the Harding Award for Parliamentary Work for the Disabled.

Hannam was knighted in the 1992 New Year Honours.

He received the Freedom of the City of Exeter in 1998.

== Sources ==
- "Times Guide to the House of Commons", Times Newspapers Limited, 1997 edition.

Parliament of the United Kingdom
| Preceded by Gwyneth Dunwoody | Member of Parliament for Exeter; 1970–1997 | Succeeded by Ben Bradshaw |
