= Richard Bosom =

English politician

Richard Bosom (died c. 1417), of Exeter, Devon, was an English politician.

== Family ==
Bosom married three times. By 1382, he had married Edith, the widow of Warren Bailly of Exeter. By 1398, he had married his second wife, a woman named Felicity. By 1417, he had married a woman named Elizabeth, and had one son.

== Career ==
He was a member (MP) of the parliament of England for Exeter in 1381, April 1384, 1386, 1394 and May 1413.
