= John Pollow =

English politician

John Pollow (fl. 1413–1419) of Exeter, Devon, was an English politician.

== Family ==
John had one daughter.

== Career ==
He was a member (MP) of the parliament of England for Exeter in May 1413, 1415, October 1416 and 1419.
