= Arthur Reed (politician) =

British politician (1881–1961)

Sir Arthur Conrad Reed (21 December 1881 – 15 January 1961) was a British Conservative Party politician.

Born in Bathford, Somerset, the son of William Henry Reed, he was educated at Queen's College, Taunton. He was elected at the 1931 general election as the member of parliament (MP) for Exeter, and held the seat until he retired from Parliament at the 1945 general election.

He was knighted in 1945.

Parliament of Great Britain
| Preceded by Sir Robert Newman, Bt | Member of Parliament for Exeter; 1931 – 1945 | Succeeded by John Maude |
