= John Simon (died 1524) =

English politician

John Simon (by 1458 - 1524), was an English politician.

He married twice. His first wife, Alison, died at some point after January 1519. They had one son together and he asked in his will if he could be buried beside her. His second wife was named Agnes.

Simon was Mayor of Exeter 1512-13 and again from 1523 to his death. He was a member (MP) of the parliament of England for Exeter in 1512 and 1515.
