= Richard Hart (died 1578) =

English politician

Richard Hart (by 1517 – 6 May 1578), of Exeter, Devon, was an English politician.

== Family ==
Hart had at least five sons.

== Career ==
Hart was member of parliament for Exeter in March 1553, October 1553 and April 1554.
