= Thomas Spurway =

Thomas Spurway (1481/83–1548), of Exeter, Devon, was an English Member of Parliament (MP).

He was a Member of the Parliament of England for Exeter in 1542. He was born in Tiverton, Devon. He was described by his contemporary, John Hooker as: ‘a reasonably tall man of stature, well compact of body, wise [of] nature and discreet, willing to please and loath to offend any man’.
