= Edward Drew (serjeant-at-law) =

Member of the Parliament of England

Member of Parliament
- In office 1592
- Constituency: City of London
- In office 1586–1588
- Preceded by: Thomas Bruarton
- Succeeded by: John Hele
- Constituency: Exeter
- In office 1584–1585
- Preceded by: John Astley
- Succeeded by: Thomas Hughes
- Constituency: Lyme Regis

Personal details
- Born: 1542 Sharpham, Ashprington, England
- Died: 22 April 1598 (aged 55–56)
- Spouse: Bridget FitzWilliam
- Children: 7
- Education: Exeter College, Oxford

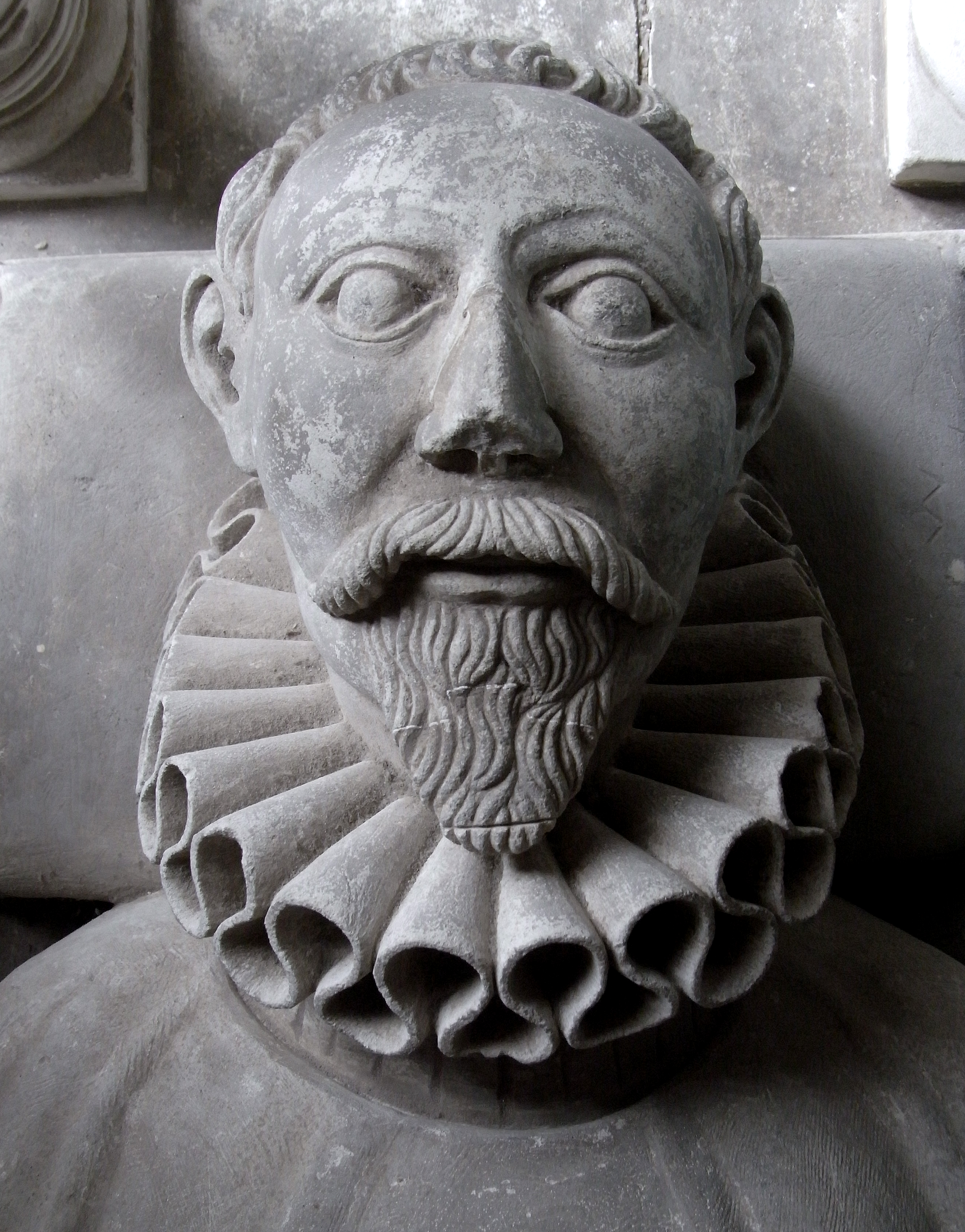
Edward Drew (c.1542–1598), detail from his effigy in St John's Church, Broadclyst

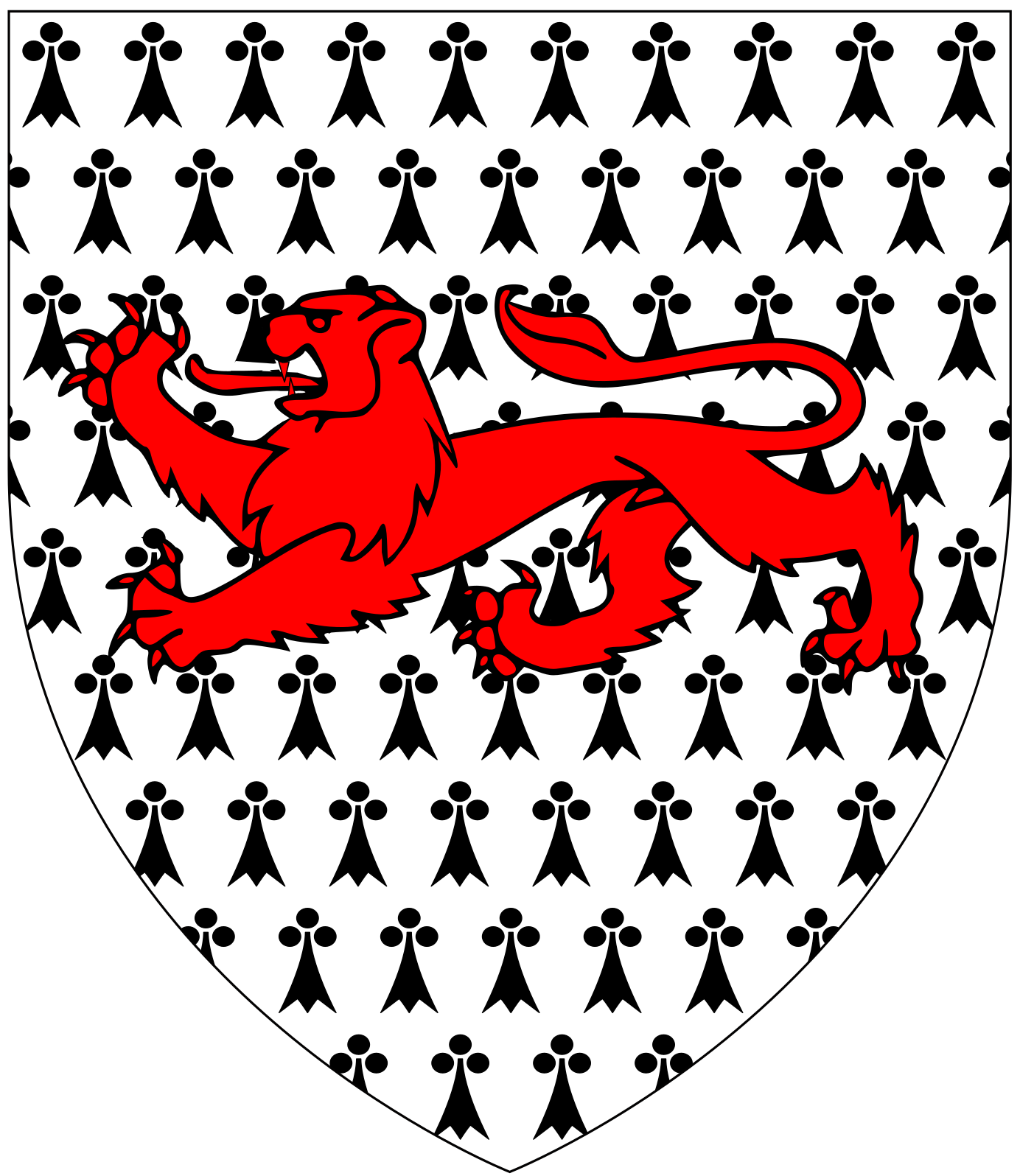
Arms of Drewe of Sharpham and of The Grange, Broadhembury, Devon: Ermine, a lion passant gules

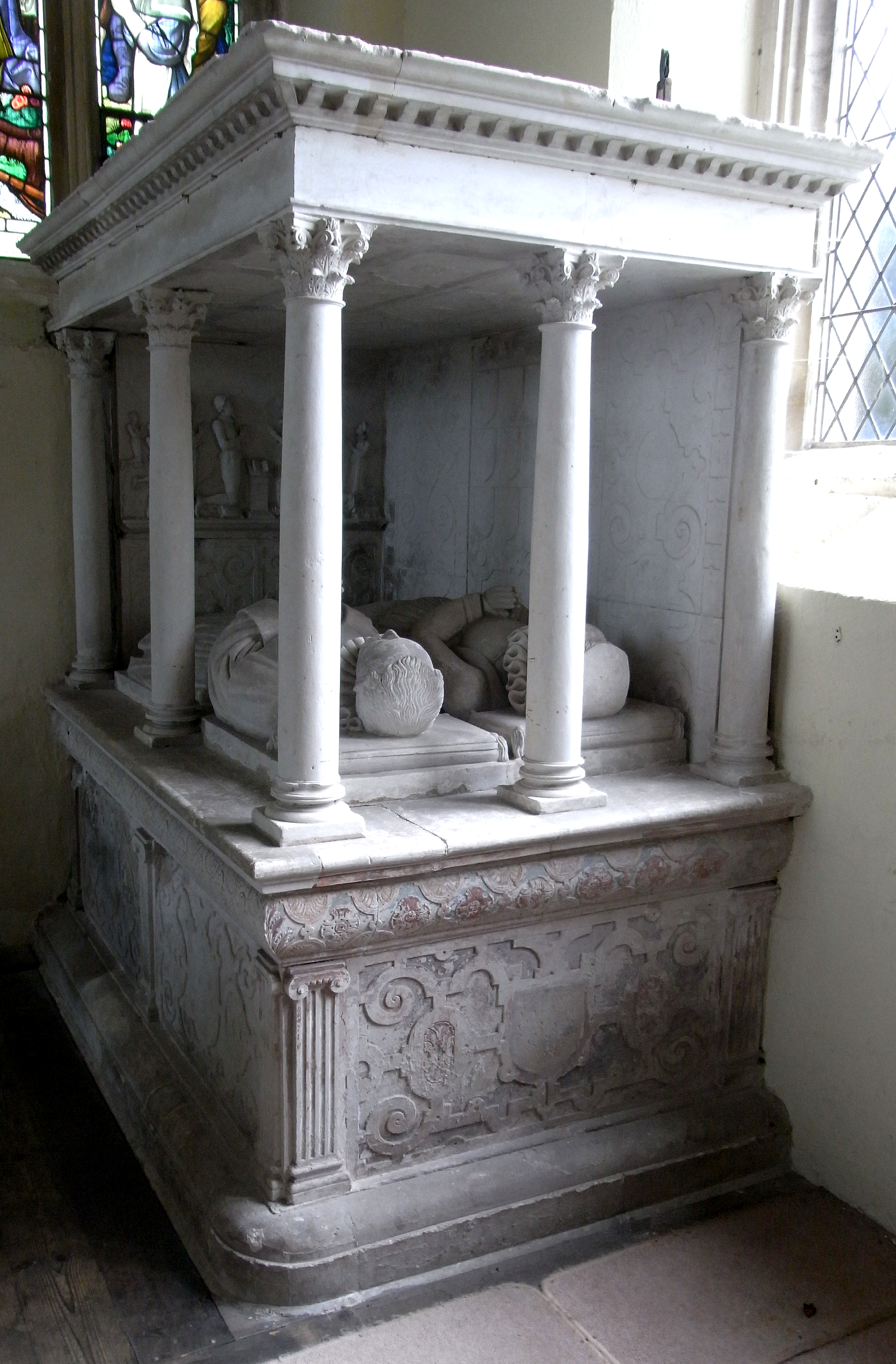
Monument to Edward Drew (c.1542–1598), east end of south aisle, Broadclyst Church

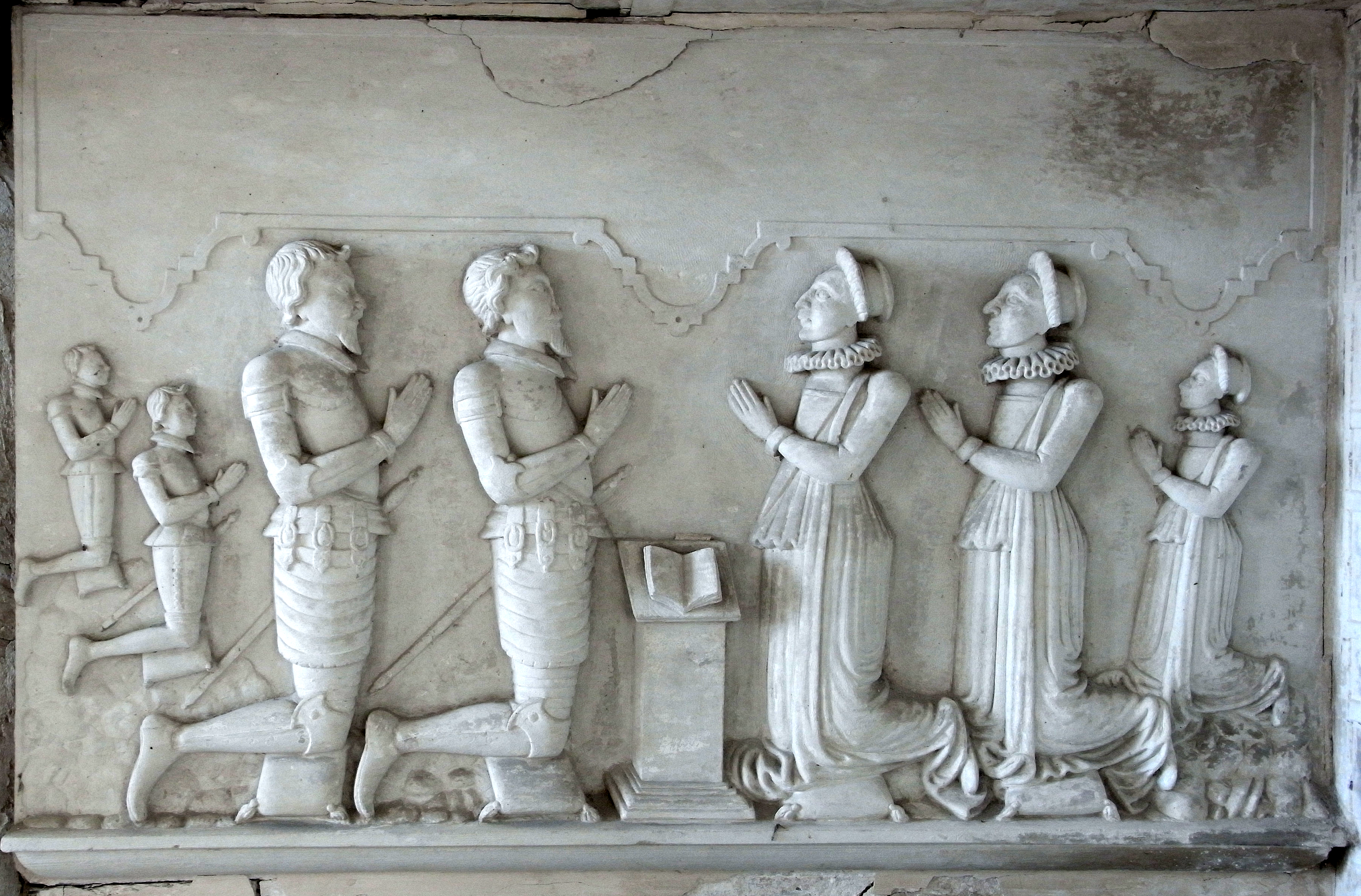
Children of Edward Drew (c.1542-1598). Relief sculpted panel at feet of effigies of Edward Drew and his wife, Broadclyst Church

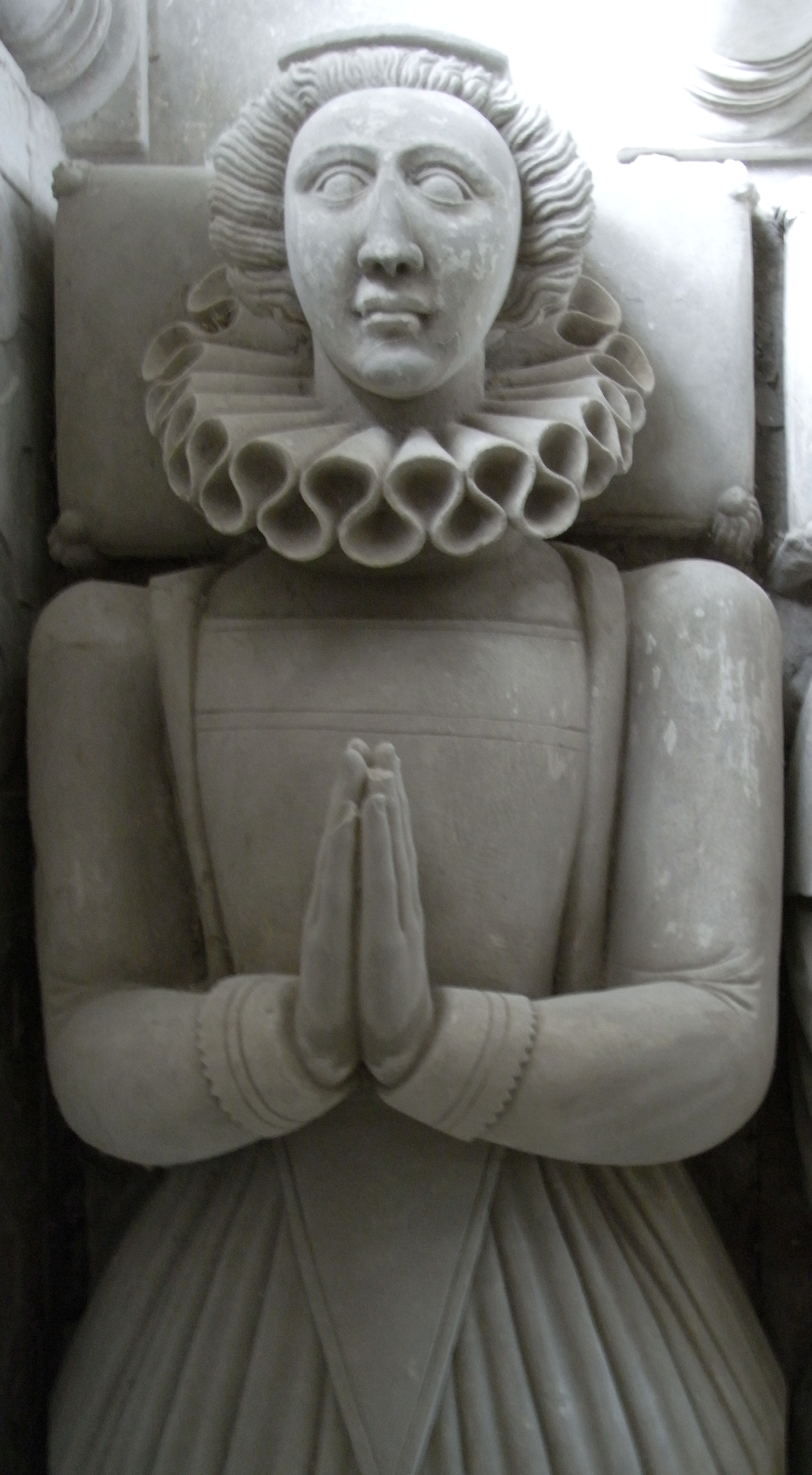
Bridget FitzWilliam of Mablethorpe, Lincolnshire, wife of Edward Drew (c.1542-1598) of Killerton. Detail from his monument in Broadclyst Church

Edward Drew (c.1542 – 22 April 1598) of Killerton, Broadclyst and The Grange, Broadhembury, Devon, was a Serjeant-at-Law to Queen Elizabeth I. He served as a Member of Parliament for Lyme Regis in 1584, twice for Exeter in 1586 and 1588 and in 1592 for the City of London. He occupied the honourable position of Recorder of the City of London.

== Origins ==
He was the eldest son of Thomas Drew (b. 1519), by his wife Eleanora Huckmore, a daughter and co-heiress of William Huckmore of Devon, and appears to have been born at the family seat of Sharpham, in the parish of Ashprington, near Totnes, Devon.

== Education ==
He attended Exeter College, Oxford, as evidenced by an entry in the register of that university recording a payment in 1557 by a Mr. Martyn of 2 shillings for the expenses of Drew, a scholar of the college. He does not appear to have taken a degree, but proceeded to London and devoted himself to the study of the law, being admitted a student of the Inner Temple in November 1560, then probably of the usual age of eighteen.

== Career ==
He obtained a lucrative practice both in London and in Devon, and rapidly attained high legal distinctions. He became a Master of the Bench of the Inner Temple in 1581, and Lent Reader in 1584; his shield of arms with this date still remains in Inner Temple Hall. In Michaelmas term 1589, together with seven other counsel, Drew was appointed Serjeant-at-Law. Two of his associates in the honour of the coif (John Glanville and Thomas Harris) were fellow Devonians, and Fuller in his Worthies of England records a popular saying about the three serjeants, that "One gained as much as the other two, one spent as much as the other two, one gave as much as the other two". Drew seems to answer best to the first description as his success in pleading enabling him to purchase large estates in Combe Raleigh, Broadhembury, Broadclyst, in Devon and elsewhere.

In 1586 he was co-trustee, with other eminent lawyers, of certain manors belonging to George Cary (c.1541–1616) of Cockington, Devonshire, Lord Deputy of Ireland. He was elected Member of Parliament for Lyme Regis in October 1584, and for Exeter in 1586 and again in November 1588; in 1592 he was appointed to the honourable position of Recorder of Exeter. On 17 June 1592 he succeeded Chief-Justice Edward Coke as Recorder of the City of London, and became MP for the City of London, a prestigious seat. In 1593 he made a fulsome speech to Queen Elizabeth I when presenting the newly elected Lord Mayor, Sir Cuthbert Buckell, for her majesty's approval, the text of which is preserved in Nichols's Progresses of Queen Elizabeth. On 27 March 1594 Drew resigned the Recordership, having been appointed Justice of Assizes and Gaol Delivery for Essex and Kent, and for his faithful services was presented by the City of London with "a basin and ewer of silver-gilt containing one hundred ounces".

== Later career, family and death ==
Drew became Queen's Serjeant in 1596, and was much employed about this time by the Privy Council in the examination of political prisoners and in various legal references. The Devon historian Tristram Risdon (d.1640), writing some fifteen years after Drew's death, stated that his "knowledge and counsel won him a general love". His death on 22 April 1598 appears to have been sudden, and is ascribed by John Chamberlain, in a letter dated 4 May 1598, to gaol fever caught while riding the northern circuit with Mr. Justice Beaumont, who also died on the same day. His will was signed, probably in extremis, on 25 April 1598, and was proved in the Prerogative Court of Canterbury on 16 May 1598. Drew sold his paternal seat of Sharpham for £2,250 and erected a mansion at Killerton in the parish of Broadclyst, Devon, on the site of monastic buildings. Here he lived, and was buried in the parish church of St John, in which a sumptuous monument remains in the south aisle, erected to his and his wife's memory in 1622, with a Latin inscription in prose and verse.

== Marriage and children ==
He married Bridget FitzWilliam of Mablethorpe, Lincolnshire, by whom he had four sons and three daughters, all of whom survived him, including:

- Thomas Drew (d.1651), eldest son and heir, knighted at the coronation of King Charles I, who moved the family's residence from Killerton to The Grange in the parish of Broadhembury, which remained long after the seat of the family.

== Sources ==
- Dictionary of National Biography, London, 1885–1900, biography of Drew, Edward
- History of Parliament biography
- Prince, John, (1643–1723) The Worthies of Devon, 1810 edition, London, pp. 334–7, biography of Drew, Edward, Serjeant at Law
