= Henry Hamlin =

16th-century English politician

Henry Hamlin (by 1484 – 1549/1550), of Exeter, Devon, was an English politician.

== Family ==
Hamlin married the daughter of Exeter MP, Thomas Andrew.

== Career ==
He was a member (MP) of the parliament of England for Exeter in 1529.
