= 1868 Exeter by-election =

Local election

The 1868 Exeter by-election was held on 21 December 1868. The by-election was held due to the incumbent Liberal MP, John Coleridge, becoming Solicitor General for England and Wales. It was retained by Coleridge who was unopposed.
