= John Grenville (MP for Exeter) =

John Grenville (by 1506 – 1562 or later), of Exeter, Devon, was an English Member of Parliament (MP).

He was a Member of the Parliament of England for Exeter in 1545, November 1554 and 1558.
