= Exeter (constituency) =

Parliamentary constituency in the United Kingdom, 1295 onwards

Coordinates: 50.722°N 3.534°W

- Borough constituency for the House of Commons
- Interactive map of boundaries from 2024
- Boundary of Exeter in South West England
- County: Devon
- Electorate: 71,713 (2023)
- Major settlements: Exeter

Current constituency
- Created: 1295
- Member of Parliament: Steve Race (Labour)
- Seats: 1295–1885: Two; 1885–present: One

Exeter (/ˈɛksɪtər/ EK-sit-ər) is a constituency (Note: A borough constituency (for the purposes of election expenses and type of returning officer)) composed of the cathedral city and county town of Devon represented in the House of Commons of the UK Parliament since 2024 by Steve Race of the Labour Party. (Note: As with all constituencies, Exeter elects one Member of Parliament (MP) by the first past the post system of election at least every five years.)

== Constituency profile ==
The Exeter constituency is located in Devon and covers most of the city of Exeter excluding some of its eastern suburbs. Exeter is a historic cathedral city with origins in the Roman period. It is home to the University of Exeter, which has around 30,000 students. The city is an important centre of employment with many commuters from nearby towns. The constituency has average levels of deprivation; the suburb of Pennsylvania near the university is affluent whilst the area around Wonford is more deprived. House prices are slightly below the national average.

In general, residents of the constituency are young and well-educated. Levels of professional employment and household income are similar to national averages. White people made up 89% of the population at the 2021 census. At the city council, most of Exeter's suburbs are represented by the Labour Party with Green Party councillors elected in the city centre. At the county council, the suburbs are instead mostly represented by Reform UK. An estimated 57% of voters in the constituency supported remaining in the European Union in the 2016 referendum compared to 48% nationwide.

== History ==
The constituency existed continuously as a parliamentary borough/borough constituency, electing two MPs from 1295 (the Model Parliament) until 1885, when its representation was reduced to one MP by the Redistribution of Seats Act 1885.

The constituency has had a history of representatives from 1900 of Conservative, Liberal Party, Independent and Labour representation. Since 1997, it has been held by the Labour Party, which currently has a majority of over 10,000, suggesting this is a safe seat for the party.

== Boundaries ==
Map of present boundaries

1918–1950: The County Borough of Exeter.

1950–1974: As prior but with redrawn boundaries.

1974–1983: As prior but with redrawn boundaries.

1983–2010: The City of Exeter.

2010–2024: The City of Exeter wards of Alphington, Cowick, Duryard, Exwick, Heavitree, Mincinglake, Newtown, Pennsylvania, Pinhoe, Polsloe, Priory, St David's, St James, St Leonard's, St Thomas, and Whipton and Barton.

2024–present: The following wards of the City of Exeter (as they existed on 1 December 2020):

- Alphington, Duryard & St James, Exwick, Heavitree, Mincinglake & Whipton, Newtown & St Leonard's, Pennsylvania, Priory, St David's, and St Thomas.

The constituency currently covers most of the city of Exeter in Devon. It covered the entire city until 2010, when, under the Fifth Periodic Review of Westminster constituencies, which increased the number of seats in the county from 11 to 12, two wards of the City of Exeter (St Loyes and Topsham) were transferred to the neighbouring East Devon constituency.

The 2023 Periodic Review of Westminster constituencies concluded that the electoral wards of Pinhoe, St Loyes and Topsham (which incorporates part of the Countess Wear area) would be included in the new constituency of Exmouth and Exeter East.

== Members of Parliament ==
=== MPs 1295–1660 ===
Parliament	First member	Second member
1351	John Prescott	
1353	John Prescott	
1365	John Prescott	
1368	John Prescott	
1386	John Grey	Richard Bosom
1388 (Feb)	Peter Hadley	Thomas Raymond
1388 (Sep)	Peter Hadley	Adam Creedy
1390 (Jan)	Adam Golde	William Frye
1390 (Nov)		
1391	John Grey	William Frye
1393	John Grey	Robert Cobbley
1394	John Grey	Richard Bosom
1395	John Grey	William Wilford
1397 (Jan)	John Grey	William Wilford
1397 (Sep)	William Frye	William Wilford
1399	Roger Golde	Robert Cobbley
1401	Adam Scut	John Coscombe
1402	Roger Golde	William Morehay
1404 (Jan)	William Wilford	Thomas Raymond
1404 (Oct)	John Nywaman	John Lake
1406	Roger Golde	William Dimmock
1407	Nicholas Clerk	William Morehay
1410	Richard Raymond	John Shaplegh I
1411	William Wilford	John Lake
1413 (Feb)	Thomas Eston	Peter Sturt
1413 (May)	Richard Bosom	John Pollow
1414 (Apr)	John Wilford	John Shaplegh II
1414 (Nov)	Roger Golde	John Wilford
1415	Richard Crese	John Pollow
1416 (Mar)	Roger Golde	Robert Vessy
1416 (Oct)	Roger Golde	John Pollow
1417	John Shaplegh II	Thomas Cook
1419	John Shaplegh II	John Pollow
1420	John Shaplegh II	Richard Crese
1421 (May)	John Cutler alias Carwithan	Roger Shillingford
1421 (Dec)	John Shaplegh II	John Shillingford
1510	Thomas Andrew	John Orenge
1512	Richard Hewet	John Simon
1515	Richard Hewet	John Simon
1523	John Noseworthy	John Bridgeman
1529	Henry Hamlin	John Blackaller, replaced 1534 by Robert Hooker alias Vowell
1536	?	
1539	John Hull	William Hurst
1542	Thomas Spurway	William Hurst
1543	Gilbert Kirk replaced Spurway and John Pasmore replaced Hurst	
1543	(substitution reversed) Thomas Spurway replaced Kirk, William Hurst replaced Pasmore	
1545	John Grenville	William Hurst
1547	John Hull, died and replaced 1549 by Thomas Prestwood	Griffith Ameredith
1553 (Mar)	Robert Weston	Richard Hart
1553 (Oct)	John Ridgeway	Richard Hart
1554 (Apr)	John Ridgeway	Richard Hart
1554 (Nov)	John Grenville	John Petre
1555	Sir John Pollard	Edmund Sture
1558	John Grenville	Walter Staplehill
1558–9	Sir John Pollard	Richard Prestwood
1562–3	Thomas Williams, died and replaced 1566 by Sir Peter Carew	Geoffrey Tothill
1571	Geoffrey Tothill	John Vowell alias Hooker
1572	Geoffrey Tothill, died and replaced 1576 by Edward Ameredith	Simon Knight
1584	Thomas Bruarton	Richard Prowse
1586	Edward Drew	John Vowell alias Hooker
1588	Edward Drew	John Peryam
1593	John Hele	John Peryam
1597	John Hele	William Martin
1601	John Hele	John Howell
1604	George Smith	John Prowse
1614	John Prowse	Thomas Martyn
1621–1622	John Prowse	Ignatius Jordain
1624	John Prowse	Nicholas Duck
1625	Ignatius Jordain	Nicholas Duck
1626	Ignatius Jordain	John Hayne
1628–1629	Ignatius Jordain	John Lynn
1629–1640	No Parliaments summoned	
Apr 1640	Robert Walker	Simon Snow in place of Jacob Tucker
Nov 1640	Robert Walker disabled 1643	Simon Snow
1645	Simon Snow secluded in Pride's Purge	Samuel Clark
1648	Samuel Clark	(one seat only)
1653	Exeter not represented in the Barebones Parliament	
1654	Thomas Bampfield	Thomas Gibbons
1656	Thomas Bampfield	Thomas Westlake
1659	Thomas Bampfield	Maj. Thomas Gibbon

=== MPs 1660–1885 ===
Two members

Year	First member	First party	Second member	Second party
1660	John Maynard		Thomas Bampfield	
1661	Sir James Smyth		Robert Walker	
1673	Sir James Smyth		Thomas Walker	
1679	William Glyde		Malachi Pyne	
1681	Sir Thomas Carew		Thomas Walker	
1685	James Walker		Edward Seymour	Tory
Jan 1689	Sir Henry Pollexfen		Edward Seymour	Tory
Jun 1689	Christopher Bale		Edward Seymour	Tory
1695	Edward Seyward		Sir Joseph Tily	
1698	Sir Edward Seymour	Tory	Sir Bartholomew Shower	
1702	Sir Edward Seymour	Tory	John Snell	Tory
Apr 1708	John Harris	Whig	John Snell	Tory
May 1708	John Harris	Whig	Nicholas Wood	Tory
1710	Sir Coplestone Bampfylde	Tory	John Snell	Tory
1713	John Rolle		Francis Drewe	
1715	John Bampfylde		Francis Drewe	
1722	John Rolle		Francis Drewe	
1727	Samuel Molyneux		Francis Drewe	
1728	John Belfield		Francis Drewe	
1734	John King		Thomas Balle	
1735	Sir Henry Northcote		Thomas Balle	
1741	Sir Henry Northcote		Humphrey Sydenham	
1743	Sir Richard Bampfylde, Bt		Humphrey Sydenham	
1747	John Tuckfield		Humphrey Sydenham	
1754	John Tuckfield		John Rolle Walter	
1767	William Spicer		John Rolle Walter	
1768	John Buller		John Rolle Walter	
1774	Sir Charles Bampfylde	Whig	John Rolle Walter	
1776	Sir Charles Bampfylde	Whig	John Baring	
1790	James Buller		John Baring	
1796	Sir Charles Bampfylde	Whig	John Baring	
1802	Sir Charles Bampfylde	Whig	James Buller	Tory
1812	William Courtenay	Tory	James Buller	Tory
1818	William Courtenay	Tory	Robert Newman	Whig
Feb 1826	Samuel Trehawke Kekewich	Tory	Robert Newman	Whig
Jun 1826	Samuel Trehawke Kekewich	Tory	Lewis William Buck	Tory
1830	James Wentworth Buller	Whig	Lewis William Buck	Tory
1832	James Wentworth Buller	Whig	Edward Divett	Radical
1835	Sir William Webb Follett	Conservative	Edward Divett	Radical
1845	Sir John Duckworth, Bt	Conservative	Edward Divett	Radical
1857	Richard Gard	Conservative	Edward Divett	Radical
1864	Richard Gard	Conservative	Viscount Courtenay	Conservative
1865	John Coleridge	Liberal	Viscount Courtenay	Conservative
1868	John Coleridge	Liberal	Edgar Alfred Bowring	Liberal
1873	Arthur Mills	Conservative	Edgar Alfred Bowring	Liberal
1874	Arthur Mills	Conservative	John George Johnson	Conservative
1880	Edward Johnson	Liberal	Henry Northcote	Conservative
1885	representation reduced to one member			

=== MPs since 1885 ===
Election	Member	Party
1885	Henry Northcote	Conservative
1899 by-election	Sir Edgar Vincent	Conservative
1906	Sir George Kekewich	Liberal
January 1910	Henry Duke	Conservative
December 1910	Harold St Maur	Liberal
1911	Henry Duke	Conservative
1918	Sir Robert Newman	Conservative
1929	Sir Robert Newman	Independent
1931	Arthur Reed	Conservative
1945	John Maude	Conservative
1951	Sir Rolf Dudley-Williams, Bt	Conservative
1966	Gwyneth Dunwoody	Labour
1970	Sir John Hannam	Conservative
1997	Sir Ben Bradshaw	Labour
2024	Steve Race	Labour

== Elections ==
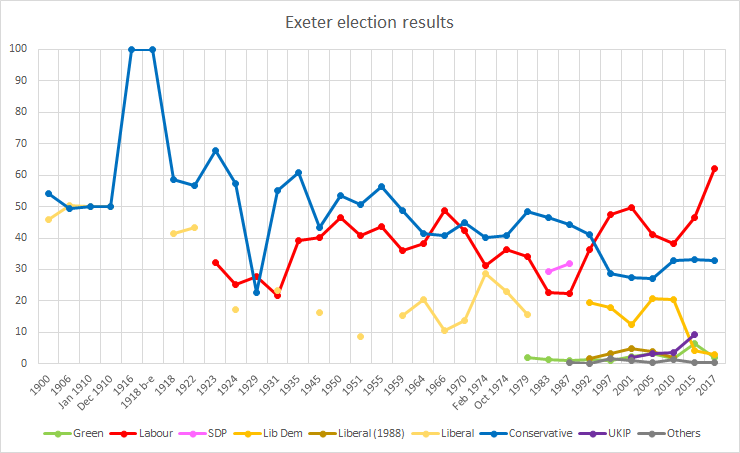
Exeter election results since 1900

=== Elections in the 2020s ===
General election 2024: Exeter
Party	Candidate	Votes	%	±%
Labour	Steve Race	18,225	45.3	−9.5
Conservative	Tessa Tucker	6,288	15.6	−16.5
Green	Andrew Bell	5,907	14.7	+5.4
Reform	Lee Bunker	4,914	12.2	+9.6
Liberal Democrats	Will Aczel	4,201	10.5	N/A
Independent	William Poulter	466	1.2	N/A
Independent	Robert Spain	194	0.5	N/A
Majority		11,937	29.7	+11.2
Turnout		40,195	59.2	−8.2
Registered electors		67,840		
Labour hold		Swing	▲3.5	

=== Elections in the 2010s ===
2019 notional result
Party	Vote	%
Labour	26,500	54.8
Conservative	15,512	32.1
Green	4,516	9.3
Brexit Party	1,257	2.6
Others	565	1.1
Liberal Democrats	8	<0.1
Turnout	48,358	67.4
Electorate	71,713	

General election 2019: Exeter
Party	Candidate	Votes	%	±%
Labour	Ben Bradshaw	29,882	53.2	−8.8
Conservative	John Gray	19,479	34.7	+1.8
Green	Joe Levy	4,838	8.6	+6.7
Brexit Party	Leslie Willis	1,428	2.5	New
Independent	Daniel Page	306	0.5	New
UKIP	Duncan Odgers	259	0.5	New
Majority		10,403	18.5	−10.6
Turnout		56,192	68.5	−3.2
Labour hold		Swing	−5.8	

General election 2017: Exeter
Party	Candidate	Votes	%	±%
Labour	Ben Bradshaw	34,336	62.0	+15.6
Conservative	James Taghdissian	18,219	32.9	−0.2
Liberal Democrats	Vanessa Newcombe	1,562	2.8	−1.5
Green	Joe Levy	1,027	1.9	−4.6
Independent	Jonathan West	212	0.4	New
Independent	Jonathan Bishop	67	0.1	New
Majority		16,117	29.1	+15.8
Turnout		55,423	71.7	+1.5
Labour hold		Swing	+7.9	

General election 2015: Exeter
Party	Candidate	Votes	%	±%
Labour	Ben Bradshaw	25,062	46.4	+8.2
Conservative	Dom Morris	17,879	33.1	+0.1
UKIP	Keith Crawford	5,075	9.4	+5.7
Green	Diana Moore	3,491	6.5	+5.0
Liberal Democrats	Joel Mason	2,321	4.3	−16.0
TUSC	Ed Potts	190	0.4	New
Majority		7,183	13.3	+8.1
Turnout		54,018	70.2	+2.5
Labour hold		Swing	+4.0	

General election 2010: Exeter
Party	Candidate	Votes	%	±%
Labour	Ben Bradshaw	19,942	38.2	−4.0
Conservative	Hannah Foster	17,221	33.0	+8.1
Liberal Democrats	Graham Oakes	10,581	20.3	−0.7
UKIP	Keith Crawford	1,930	3.7	+0.3
Liberal	Chris Gale	1,108	2.1	−2.3
Green	Paula Black	792	1.5	−2.3
BNP	Robert Farmer	673	1.3	New
Majority		2,721	5.2	−12.1
Turnout		52,247	67.7	+3.4
Labour hold		Swing	−6.0	

=== Elections in the 2000s ===
General election 2005: Exeter
Party	Candidate	Votes	%	±%
Labour	Ben Bradshaw	22,619	41.1	−8.7
Conservative	Peter Cox	14,954	27.2	−0.2
Liberal Democrats	Jon Underwood	11,340	20.6	+8.2
Liberal	Margaret Danks	2,214	4.0	−0.9
Green	Tim Brenan	1,896	3.4	+1.0
UKIP	Mark Fitzgeorge-Parker	1,854	3.4	+1.3
Independent	John Stuart	191	0.3	−1.8
Majority		7,665	13.9	−8.5
Turnout		55,068	64.8	+0.6
Labour hold		Swing	−4.2	

General election 2001: Exeter
Party	Candidate	Votes	%	±%
Labour	Ben Bradshaw	26,194	49.8	+2.3
Conservative	Anne Jobson	14,435	27.4	−1.2
Liberal Democrats	Richard Copus	6,512	12.4	−5.6
Liberal	David Morrish	2,596	4.9	+1.6
Green	Paul Edwards	1,240	2.4	+1.4
UKIP	John Stuart	1,109	2.1	New
Socialist Alliance	Francis Choules	530	1.0	New
Majority		11,759	22.4	+3.5
Turnout		52,616	64.2	−14.0
Labour hold		Swing	+1.7	

=== Elections in the 1990s ===
General election 1997: Exeter
Party	Candidate	Votes	%	±%
Labour	Ben Bradshaw	29,398	47.5	+11.3
Conservative	Adrian Rogers	17,693	28.6	−13.5
Liberal Democrats	Dennis Brewer	11,148	18.0	−1.4
Liberal	David Morrish	2,062	3.3	+1.5
Green	Paul Edwards	643	1.0	−0.2
UKIP	Corrine Haynes	638	1.0	New
Pensioners	James Meakin	282	0.5	New
Majority		11,705	18.9	N/A
Turnout		61,864	78.2	−2.3
Labour gain from Conservative		Swing	+12.5	

General election 1992: Exeter
Party	Candidate	Votes	%	±%
Conservative	John Hannam	25,543	41.1	−3.3
Labour	John N. Lloyd	22,498	36.2	+13.7
Liberal Democrats	Graham J. Oakes	12,059	19.4	−12.4
Liberal	Alison C. Micklem	1,119	1.8	New
Green	Tim J.R. Brenan	764	1.2	+0.2
Natural Law	Michael J. Turnbull	98	0.2	New
Majority		3,045	4.9	−7.7
Turnout		62,081	80.5	−0.1
Conservative hold		Swing	−8.5	

=== Elections in the 1980s ===
General election 1987: Exeter
Party	Candidate	Votes	%	±%
Conservative	John Hannam	26,922	44.4	−2.1
SDP	Mike Thomas	19,266	31.8	+2.5
Labour	John Vincent	13,643	22.5	−0.3
Green	Raymond Vail	597	1.0	−0.4
L.A.P.P	Nigel Byles	209	0.3	New
Majority		7,656	12.6	−4.6
Turnout		60,637	80.6	+2.6
Conservative hold		Swing	−2.3	

General election 1983: Exeter
Party	Candidate	Votes	%	±%
Conservative	John Hannam	26,660	46.5	−1.9
SDP	Stephen Mennell	16,780	29.3	+13.7
Labour	Richard Evans	13,088	22.8	−11.3
Ecology	Peter Frings	779	1.4	−0.5
Majority		9,880	17.2	+2.9
Turnout		57,307	78.0	−3.6
Conservative hold		Swing	-7.8	

=== Elections in the 1970s ===
General election 1979: Exeter
Party	Candidate	Votes	%	±%
Conservative	John Hannam	27,173	48.4	+7.7
Labour	G.W. Hobbs	19,146	34.1	−2.3
Liberal	H. Marsh	8,756	15.6	−7.3
Ecology	Peter Frings	1,053	1.9	New
Majority		8,027	14.3	+10.0
Turnout		56,128	81.6	+1.3
Conservative hold		Swing	+5.0	

General election October 1974: Exeter
Party	Candidate	Votes	%	±%
Conservative	John Hannam	21,970	40.7	+0.6
Labour	F Keith Taylor	19,622	36.4	+5.2
Liberal	David John Morrish	12,342	22.9	−5.9
Majority		2,348	4.3	−4.6
Turnout		53,934	80.3	−5.0
Conservative hold		Swing	-2.9	

General election February 1974: Exeter
Party	Candidate	Votes	%	±%
Conservative	John Hannam	22,762	40.1	−5.7
Labour	G. Powell	17,686	31.2	−9.6
Liberal	David John Morrish	16,322	28.8	+15.2
Majority		5,076	8.9	+6.3
Turnout		56,770	85.3	+4.2
Conservative hold		Swing	+7.7	

General election 1970: Exeter
Party	Candidate	Votes	%	±%
Conservative	John Hannam	21,680	45.0	+4.2
Labour	Gwyneth Dunwoody	20,409	42.4	−6.2
Liberal	David John Morrish	6,672	13.6	+2.9
Majority		1,271	2.6	N/A
Turnout		48,761	81.1	−2.5
Conservative gain from Labour		Swing	+5.2	

=== Elections in the 1960s ===
General election 1966: Exeter
Party	Candidate	Votes	%	±%
Labour	Gwyneth Dunwoody	22,199	48.6	+10.3
Conservative	Rolf Dudley-Williams	18,613	40.8	−0.6
Liberal	Ronald Cuthbert Thompson	4,869	10.7	−9.6
Majority		3,586	7.85	N/A
Turnout		45,681	83.63	+3.3
Labour gain from Conservative		Swing	+5.49	

General election 1964: Exeter
Party	Candidate	Votes	%	±%
Conservative	Rolf Dudley-Williams	18,035	41.4	−7.3
Labour	Gwyneth Dunwoody	16,673	38.3	+2.4
Liberal	Ronald Cuthbert Thompson	8,815	20.3	+4.8
Majority		1,362	3.1	−9.7
Turnout		43,523	80.3	−1.7
Conservative hold		Swing	−4.8	

=== Elections in the 1950s ===
General election 1959: Exeter
Party	Candidate	Votes	%	±%
Conservative	Rolf Dudley-Williams	21,579	48.7	−7.6
Labour	Albert John Rogers	15,918	35.9	−7.8
Liberal	Gordon Taylor	6,852	15.5	New
Majority		5,661	12.8	+0.2
Turnout		44,349	82.0	+2.7
Conservative hold		Swing	+0.1	

General election 1955: Exeter
Party	Candidate	Votes	%	±%
Conservative	Rolf Dudley-Williams	24,147	56.28	+5.48
Labour	Leslie Merrion	18,759	43.72	+3.08
Majority		5,388	12.56	+2.41
Turnout		42,906	79.31	
Conservative hold		Swing	+1.20	

General election 1951: Exeter
Party	Candidate	Votes	%	±%
Conservative	Rolf Dudley-Williams	23,218	50.80	−2.72
Labour	Edward Bishop	18,576	40.65	−5.83
Liberal	Ellen E Tinkham	3,908	8.55	New
Majority		4,642	10.15	+3.11
Turnout		45,702	84.13	
Conservative hold		Swing	+1.56	

General election 1950: Exeter
Party	Candidate	Votes	%	±%
Conservative	John Maude	24,339	53.52	
Labour	Tom Horabin	21,135	46.48	
Majority		3,204	7.04	
Turnout		45,474	86.00	
Conservative hold		Swing		

=== Election in the 1940s ===
General election 1945: Exeter
Party	Candidate	Votes	%	±%
Conservative	John Maude	16,420	43.34	−17.44
Labour	Reginald J Travess	15,245	40.24	+1.02
Liberal	Freda Evelyn Griffith Morgan	6,220	16.42	New
Majority		1,175	3.10	
Turnout		37,885	74.46	
Conservative hold		Swing		

=== Elections in the 1930s ===
General Election 1939–40: Another General Election was required to take place before the end of 1940. The political parties had been making preparations for an election to take place and by the Autumn of 1939, the following candidates had been selected;

- Conservative: Arthur Reed
- Labour: William Robert Robins
- Liberal: Henry Gebhardt
- British Union: Rafe Temple Cotton

General election 1935: Exeter
Party	Candidate	Votes	%	±%
Conservative	Arthur Reed	21,192	60.78	+5.59
Labour	John Stafford Cripps	13,674	39.22	+17.65
Majority		7,518	21.56	
Turnout		34,866	75.86	
Conservative hold		Swing		

General election 1931: Exeter
Party	Candidate	Votes	%	±%
Conservative	Arthur Reed	20,360	55.19	+32.49
Liberal	Eleanor Acland	8,571	23.23	New
Labour	James Viner Delahaye	7,958	21.57	−6.23
Majority		11,789	31.96	
Turnout		36,889	84.77	
Conservative hold		Swing		

=== Elections in the 1920s ===
General election 1929: Exeter
Party	Candidate	Votes	%	±%
Independent	Robert Newman	16,642	49.5	−8.0
Labour	J. Lloyd Jones	9,361	27.8	+2.6
Unionist	Geoffrey Dorling Roberts	7,622	22.7	−34.8
Majority		7,281	21.7	N/A
Turnout		33,625	81.9	−0.2
Independent gain from Unionist		Swing	N/A	

General election 1924: Exeter
Party	Candidate	Votes	%	±%
Unionist	Robert Newman	14,522	57.5	−10.2
Labour	A J Penny	6,359	25.2	−7.1
Liberal	Thomas Fairchild Day	4,359	17.3	New
Majority		8,163	32.3	−3.1
Turnout		25,240	82.1	+9.5
Unionist hold		Swing	−1.5	

General election 1923: Exeter
Party	Candidate	Votes	%	±%
Unionist	Robert Newman	14,908	67.7	+11.0
Labour	Lothian Small	7,123	32.3	New
Majority		7,785	35.4	+22.0
Turnout		22,031	72.6	−13.0
Unionist hold		Swing	N/A	

Leonard Costello

General election 1922: Exeter
Party	Candidate	Votes	%	±%
Unionist	Robert Newman	14,326	56.7	−2.0
Liberal	Leonard Costello	10,920	43.3	+2.0
Majority		3,406	13.4	−4.0
Turnout		25,246	85.6	+17.4
Unionist hold		Swing	−2.0	

== Election results 1885–1918 ==
=== Elections in the 1880s ===
General election 1885: Exeter
Party	Candidate	Votes	%	±%
Conservative	Henry Northcote	3,315	51.9	−10.9
Liberal	Edward Johnson	3,074	48.1	+10.9
Majority		241	3.8	N/A
Turnout		6,389	91.8	+15.3 (est)
Registered electors		6,963		
Conservative win (new seat)				

General election 1886: Exeter
Party	Candidate	Votes	%	±%
Conservative	Henry Northcote	3,222	52.8	+0.9
Liberal	Edward Johnson	2,879	47.2	−0.9
Majority		343	5.6	+1.8
Turnout		6,101	87.6	−4.2
Registered electors		6,963		
Conservative hold		Swing	+0.9	

=== Elections in the 1890s ===
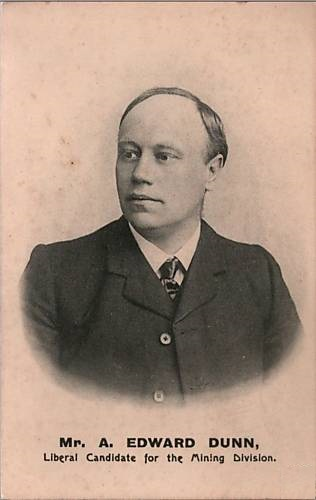

General election 1892: Exeter
Party	Candidate	Votes	%	±%
Conservative	Henry Northcote	3,884	53.8	+1.0
Liberal	Albert Dunn	3,329	46.2	−1.0
Majority		555	7.6	+2.0
Turnout		7,213	90.5	+2.9
Registered electors		7,972		
Conservative hold		Swing	+1.0	

General election 1895: Exeter
Party	Candidate	Votes	%	±%
Conservative	Henry Northcote	3,857	53.4	−0.4
Liberal	Adam Spencer Hogg	3,363	46.6	+0.4
Majority		494	6.8	−0.8
Turnout		7,220	88.1	−2.4
Registered electors		8,198		
Conservative hold		Swing	−0.4	

1899 Exeter by-election
Party	Candidate	Votes	%	±%
Conservative	Edgar Vincent	4,030	54.5	+1.1
Liberal	Allan Bright	3,371	45.5	−1.1
Majority		659	9.0	+2.2
Turnout		7,401	86.1	+2.0
Registered electors		8,595		
Conservative hold		Swing	+0.7	

=== Elections in the 1900s ===
General election 1900: Exeter
Party	Candidate	Votes	%	±%
Conservative	Edgar Vincent	4,001	54.1	+0.7
Liberal	Allan Bright	3,388	45.9	−0.7
Majority		613	8.2	+1.4
Turnout		7,389	84.9	−3.2
Registered electors		8,708		
Conservative hold		Swing	+0.7	

Kekewich

General election 1906: Exeter
Party	Candidate	Votes	%	±%
Liberal	George Kekewich	4,469	50.5	+4.6
Conservative	Edgar Vincent	4,384	49.5	−4.6
Majority		85	1.0	N/A
Turnout		8,853	92.5	+7.6
Registered electors		9,567		
Liberal gain from Conservative		Swing	+4.6	

=== Elections in the 1910s ===
General election January 1910: Exeter
Party	Candidate	Votes	%	±%
Conservative	Henry Duke	4,902	50.1	+0.6
Liberal	Harold St. Maur	4,876	49.9	−0.6
Majority		26	0.2	N/A
Turnout		9,778	94.2	+1.7
Registered electors		10,383		
Conservative gain from Liberal		Swing	+0.6	

St Maur

General election December 1910: Exeter
Party	Candidate	Votes	%	±%
Conservative	Henry Duke	4,777	50.0	−0.1
Liberal	Harold St. Maur	4,776	50.0	+0.1
Majority		1	0.0	−0.2
Turnout		9,553	92.0	−2.2
Registered electors		10,383		
Conservative hold		Swing	−0.1	

Upon petition, this election was subject to a recount due to the closeness of the results. On the first count, St. Maur led with 4,786 votes to Duke's 4,782. On a second count, St. Maur again led with 4,782 votes to Duke's 4,778. Closer scrutiny led to the above count, allowing Duke to retain the seat.

General Election 1914–15:

Another General Election was required to take place before the end of 1915. The political parties had been making preparations for an election to take place and by July 1914, the following candidates had been selected;

- Unionist: Henry Duke
- Liberal:

Duke is appointed Chief Secretary to the Lord Lieutenant of Ireland, prompting a by-election.

By-election, 1916 Exeter
Party	Candidate	Votes	%	±%
Unionist	Henry Duke	Unopposed		
Unionist hold				

Duke is appointed Lord Justice of Appeal and resigns, prompting a by-election.

By-election, 1918 Exeter
Party	Candidate	Votes	%	±%
Unionist	Robert Newman	Unopposed		
Unionist hold				

General election 1918: Exeter
Party		Candidate	Votes	%	±%
C	Unionist	Robert Newman	12,524	58.7	+8.7
	Liberal	Leonard Costello	8,806	41.3	−8.7
Majority			3,718	17.4	+17.4
Turnout			21,330	68.2	−23.8
	Unionist hold		Swing	+8.7	
C indicates candidate endorsed by the coalition government.

== Election results 1868–1880 ==
=== Elections in the 1860s ===
General election 1865: Exeter (2 seats)
Party	Candidate	Votes	%	±%
Conservative	Edward Courtenay	Unopposed		
Liberal	John Coleridge	Unopposed		
Registered electors		3,088		
Conservative hold				
Liberal hold				

General election 1868: Exeter (2 seats)
Party	Candidate	Votes	%	±%
Liberal	John Coleridge	2,317	25.8	N/A
Liberal	Edgar Alfred Bowring	2,247	25.0	N/A
Conservative	John Burgess Karslake	2,218	24.7	N/A
Conservative	Arthur Mills	2,206	24.5	N/A
Majority		29	0.3	N/A
Turnout		4,494 (est)	73.0 (est)	N/A
Registered electors		6,156		
Liberal hold		Swing		
Liberal gain from Conservative		Swing		

Coleridge was appointed Solicitor General for England and Wales, requiring a by-election.

By-election, 21 December 1868: Exeter (1 seat)
Party	Candidate	Votes	%	±%
Liberal	John Coleridge	Unopposed		
Liberal hold				

=== Elections in the 1870s ===
Coleridge resigned after being appointed Chief Justice of the Court of Common Pleas

By-election, 11 Dec 1873: Exeter (2 seats)
Party	Candidate	Votes	%	±%
Conservative	Arthur Mills	2,346	53.7	+4.5
Liberal	Edward Watkin	2,025	46.3	−4.5
Majority		321	7.4	N/A
Turnout		4,371	70.4	−2.6
Registered electors		6,206		
Conservative gain from Liberal		Swing	+4.5	

General election 1874: Exeter (2 seats)
Party	Candidate	Votes	%	±%
Conservative	Arthur Mills	2,523	27.5	+3.0
Conservative	John George Johnson	2,330	25.4	+0.7
Liberal	Edgar Alfred Bowring	2,264	24.7	−0.3
Liberal	Edward Johnson	2,053	22.4	−3.4
Majority		66	0.7	N/A
Turnout		4,585 (est)	72.4 (est)	−0.6
Registered electors		6,337		
Conservative gain from Liberal		Swing	+1.7	
Conservative gain from Liberal		Swing	+2.1	

=== Elections in the 1880s ===
General election 1880: Exeter (2 seats)
Party	Candidate	Votes	%	±%
Liberal	Edward Johnson	3,038	37.2	−9.9
Conservative	Henry Northcote	2,590	31.7	+6.3
Conservative	Arthur Mills	2,545	31.1	+3.6
Majority		493	6.1	N/A
Turnout		5,628 (est)	76.5 (est)	+4.1
Registered electors		7,361		
Liberal gain from Conservative		Swing	+5.6	
Conservative hold		Swing	+4.0	

== Election results 1832–1868 ==
=== Elections in the 1830s ===
General election 1832: Exeter (2 seats)
Party	Candidate	Votes	%	±%
Whig	James Wentworth Buller	1,615	43.4	−1.4
Radical	Edward Divett	1,121	30.1	+7.5
Tory	William Webb Follett	985	26.5	−6.1
Turnout		2,055	69.6	c. −0.4
Registered electors		2,952		
Majority		494	13.3	+1.1
Whig hold		Swing	+2.2	
Majority		136	3.6	N/A
Radical gain from Tory		Swing	+5.3	

General election 1835: Exeter (2 seats)
Party	Candidate	Votes	%	±%
Conservative	William Webb Follett	1,425	39.3	+12.8
Radical	Edward Divett	1,176	32.4	+2.3
Whig	James Wentworth Buller	1,029	28.3	−15.1
Turnout		2,242	69.2	−0.4
Registered electors		3,239		
Majority		249	6.9	N/A
Conservative gain from Whig		Swing	+10.2	
Majority		147	4.1	+0.5
Radical hold		Swing	+4.9	

General election 1837: Exeter (2 seats)
Party	Candidate	Votes	%
Conservative	William Webb Follett	Unopposed	
Radical	Edward Divett	Unopposed	
Registered electors		3,488	
Conservative hold			
Radical hold			

=== Elections in the 1840s ===
General election 1841: Exeter (2 seats)
Party	Candidate	Votes	%	±%
Conservative	William Webb Follett	1,302	36.0	N/A
Radical	Edward Divett	1,192	33.0	N/A
Conservative	Algernon Percy	1,119	31.0	N/A
Turnout		2,302	62.2	N/A
Registered electors		3,698		
Majority		110	3.0	N/A
Conservative hold		Swing	N/A	
Majority		73	2.0	N/A
Radical hold		Swing	N/A	

Follett was appointed Solicitor General for England and Wales, requiring a by-election.

By-election, 13 September 1841: Exeter
Party	Candidate	Votes	%	±%
Conservative	William Webb Follett	Unopposed		
Conservative hold				

Follett was appointed Attorney General for England and Wales, requiring a by-election.

By-election, 20 April 1844: Exeter
Party	Candidate	Votes	%	±%
Conservative	William Webb Follett	1,293	71.0	+4.0
Whig	John Briggs	529	29.0	−4.0
Majority		764	42.0	+39.0
Turnout		1,822	48.9	−13.3
Registered electors		3,728		
Conservative hold		Swing	+4.0	

Follett's death caused a by-election.

By-election, 7 July 1845: Exeter
Party	Candidate	Votes	%	±%
Conservative	John Duckworth	1,258	68.1	+1.1
Whig	John Briggs	588	31.9	−1.1
Majority		670	36.2	+33.2
Turnout		1,846	49.5	−12.7
Registered electors		3,728		
Conservative hold		Swing	+1.1	

General election 1847: Exeter (2 seats)
Party	Candidate	Votes	%	±%
Conservative	John Duckworth	Unopposed		
Radical	Edward Divett	Unopposed		
Registered electors		3,798		
Conservative hold				
Radical hold				

=== Elections in the 1850s ===
General election 1852: Exeter (2 seats)
Party	Candidate	Votes	%	±%
Conservative	John Duckworth	1,210	34.5	N/A
Radical	Edward Divett	1,191	33.9	N/A
Conservative	George Buck	1,111	31.6	N/A
Turnout		2,352 (est)	94.0 (est)	N/A
Registered electors		2,501		
Majority		19	0.6	N/A
Conservative hold		Swing	N/A	
Majority		80	2.3	N/A
Radical hold		Swing	N/A	

General election 1857: Exeter (2 seats)
Party	Candidate	Votes	%	±%
Conservative	Richard Gard	Unopposed		
Radical	Edward Divett	Unopposed		
Registered electors		3,162		
Conservative hold				
Radical hold				

General election 1859: Exeter (2 seats)
Party	Candidate	Votes	%	±%
Conservative	Richard Gard	Unopposed		
Liberal	Edward Divett	Unopposed		
Registered electors		3,216		
Conservative hold				
Liberal hold				

=== Elections in the 1860s ===
Divett's death caused a by-election.

By-election, 4 August 1864: Exeter (1 seat)
Party	Candidate	Votes	%	±%
Conservative	Edward Courtenay	1,096	50.6	N/A
Liberal	John Coleridge	1,070	49.4	N/A
Majority		26	1.2	N/A
Turnout		2,166	84.5	N/A
Registered electors		2,564		
Conservative gain from Liberal		Swing	N/A	

== Elections before 1832 ==
General election 1831: Exeter (2 seats)
Party	Candidate	Votes	%
Whig	James Wentworth Buller	753	44.8
Tory	Lewis William Buck	548	32.6
Radical	Edward Divett	379	22.6
Turnout		910	c. 70.0
Registered electors		c. 1,300	
Majority		205	12.2
Whig hold			
Majority		169	10.0
Tory hold			

General election 1830: Exeter (2 seats)
Party	Candidate	Votes	%
Tory	Lewis William Buck	Unopposed	
Whig	James Wentworth Buller	Unopposed	
Tory hold			
Whig gain from Tory			

== See also ==
- List of parliamentary constituencies in Devon
