= Adam Creedy =

14th-century English politician

Adam Creedy (fl. 1388) was an English politician.

He was a member (MP) of the parliament of England for Exeter in September 1388.
