= John Shapleigh (died 1414) =

English politician

John Shapleigh (died 1414), of Exeter, Devon, was an English politician.

== Family ==
He was the father of the MP, John Shapleigh II.

== Career ==
He was a member (MP) of the parliament of England for Exeter in 1410.
