= William Frye (MP) =

English politician

William Frye (died 1427), of Feniton, Devon, was an English politician.

== Family ==
Frye married a woman named Joan.

== Career ==
He was a member (MP) of the parliament of England for Exeter in January 1390, 1391 and September 1397.
