= 1916 Exeter by-election =

1916 UK parliamentary by-election

The 1916 Exeter by-election was held on 7 August 1916. The by-election was held due to the incumbent Conservative MP, Henry Duke, becoming Chief Secretary for Ireland. It was retained by Duke, who was unopposed due to the war-time electoral pact.
