= Roger Golde =

English politician

Roger Golde (died 1429), of Exeter, Devon, was an English politician.

== Career ==
Golde was the son of the MP, Adam Golde.

== Career ==
He was a member (MP) of the parliament of England for Exeter in 1399, 1402, 1406, November 1414, March 1416 and October 1416.
