= Robert Cobbley =

English politician

Robert Cobbley (fl. 1391–1399), of Exeter, Devon, was an English politician.

He was a member (MP) of the parliament of England for Barnstaple in 1391 and for Exeter in 1393 and 1399.
