= William Wilford =

English politician

Personal details
- Died: 1413
- Occupation: politician

William Wilford (died 1413), of Exeter, Devon, was an English politician.

== Family ==
Wilford was the son of the MP, Robert Wilford.

== Career ==
He was a Member (MP) of the Parliament of England for Exeter in 1395, January 1397, September 1397, January 1404 and 1411. He also served on Exeter's town council and was seven times Mayor of Exeter, dying during his last mayoralty.

== English raid on Brittany in 1403 ==
In August 1403 a French force under Guillaume II du Chastel (died 1404) sailed across the Channel and mounted a bold raid on the Devon coast, in which they plundered and burned the town of Plymouth. By November that year, the West Country had put together a fleet for an expedition of retaliation. Consisting of vessels contributed by the shipowners of Plymouth, Dartmouth and Bristol, Wilford was appointed as admiral in command.

Crossing to the port of Brest, they captured six foreign vessels there and the next day took four more, holding cargoes of olive oil, tallow and iron. Moving south-east to the island of Belle-Île-en-Mer, they seized a fleet of 30 to 40 ships from La Rochelle, carrying off about 1,000 casks of wine. Heading north-west, Wilford landed troops on the promontory of Penmarc'h and advanced 18 miles (29 km) inland, plundering and burning villages on their way. Finally, sailing north, their revenge was completed by landing at the settlement of St Mathieu outside Brest and destroying it completely.

== Death ==
Wilford died during his seventh term as Mayor of Exeter shortly after making his will on 30 June 1413, and was buried in Exeter Cathedral.
