= John Shapleigh (fl. 1414–1427) =

English politician

John Shapleigh (fl. 1414–1427) of Exeter, Devon, was an English politician.

== Family ==
He was the son of the MP, John Shapleigh.

== Career ==
He was a member (MP) of the parliament of England for Exeter in April 1414, 1417, 1419, 1420, December 1421, 1423, 1426 and 1427.
