= The Grange, Broadhembury =

Historic estate in Devon, England

Coordinates: 50.8303°N 3.2895°W

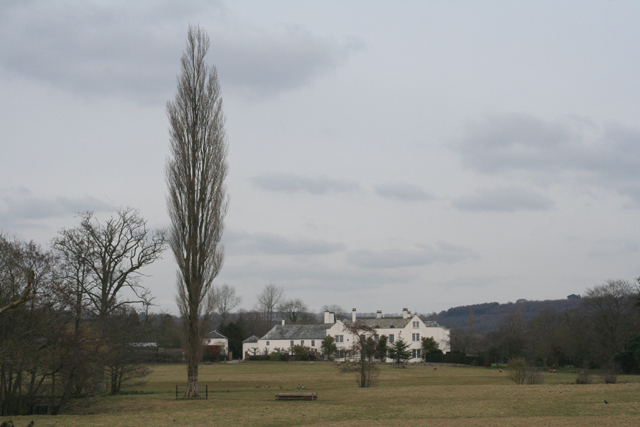
The Grange, Broadhembury, west front in 2006

The Grange is a historic estate in the parish of Broadhembury in Devon, England. The surviving 16th-century mansion house (known as The Grange) is listed Grade I on the National Heritage List for England.

== History ==
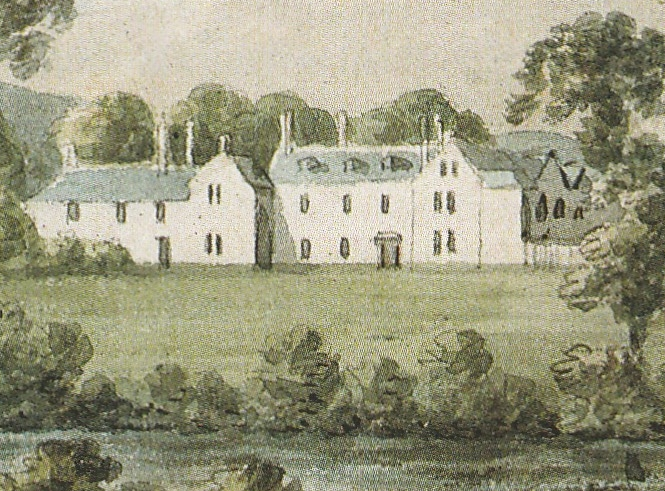
The Grange; detail from 1800 Swete watercolour

The Grange estate served originally as the grange of nearby Dunkeswell Abbey, the lands of which were sold off by the Crown following the Dissolution of the Monasteries. The manor of Broadhembury was amongst these possessions and was acquired from the Crown by Thomas Wriothesley, 1st Earl of Southampton (1505-1550), whose grandson sold it to Edward Drew (c.1542–1598). Edward Drew (c.1542–1598) later purchased the manor of Broadhembury including the lands and buildings of the grange of Dunkeswell Abbey.

Arthur Charles Edward Locke, of Northmoor, eldest son of Adèle Caroline Drewe (d.1895) sold the Grange estate in 1903.

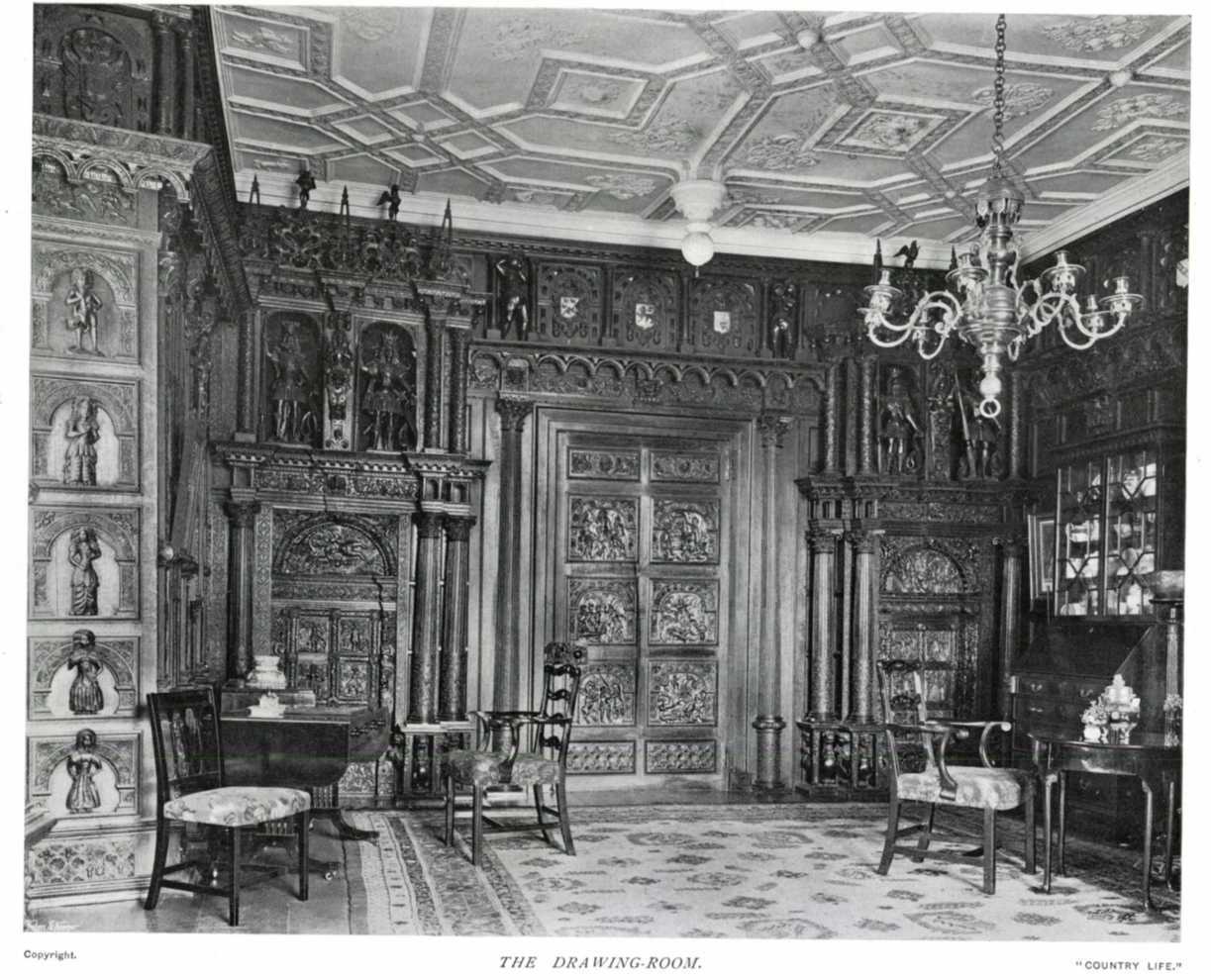
The drawing room in situ at the Grange, 1904

At some time before 1927 the 17th-century carved and highly decorative oak panelling of the room in the south crosswing, the drawing room in 1904, was purchased by the art dealer "Charles of London" (Charles Duveen, younger brother of Joseph Duveen) and was shipped to its New York showroom where it was purchased by the tycoon William Randolph Hearst (1863-1951) who placed it in warehouse storage together with many other such purchases. In 1943/4 it was purchased by Dr Preston Pope Satterwhite of Louisville, Kentucky (a friend of Mrs J.B. Speed) who donated it to the Speed Art Museum in Louisville, Kentucky, USA. In 1943 it was reassembled in the museum as a slightly longer room, called "The English Renaissance Room", but reopened in March 2016 after substantial refurbishment in its original proportions.

In the late 1990s, The Grange house was purchased by Ben Andersen. The gardens of The Grange were featured in the 2017 book The Secret Gardeners by Victoria Summerley and photographer Hugo Rittson Thomas.
