= John Coscombe =

English politician

John Coscombe or Goscombe (fl. 1401) was an English politician.

== Family ==
Coscombe was the son of William Coscombe and his wife Margery.

== Career ==
He was a member (MP) of the parliament of England for Exeter in 1401.
