= John Prince (biographer) =

English biographer (1643–1723)

Rev. John Prince (1643–1723), vicar of Totnes and Berry Pomeroy in Devon, England, was a biographer. He is best known for his Worthies of Devon, a series of biographies of Devon-born notables covering the period before the Norman Conquest to his own era. He became the subject of a sexual scandal, the court records of which were made into a book in 2001 and a play in 2005.

== Origins ==
John Prince was born in 1643 in a farmhouse (now called Prince's Abbey) on the site of Newenham Abbey, in the parish of Axminster, Devon. He was the eldest son of Bernard Prince (died 1689) (to whom John erected a monument in Axminster Church) by his first wife Mary Crocker, daughter of John Crocker, of the ancient Crocker family seated at Lyneham House in the parish of Yealmpton, Devon. Lyneham was, after Hele the second earliest known home of the Crocker family, one of the most ancient in Devon according to the traditional rhyme quoted by Prince himself which he called "that old saw often used among us in discourse":

Crocker, Cruwys, and Coplestone,
When the Conqueror came were at home

John Prince had a family connection to his great contemporary John Churchill, 1st Duke of Marlborough (1650–1722). Prince's father Bernard Prince had married secondly (as her second husband) to Jane Drake, a daughter of Philip Drake of Salcombe, third in descent from John Drake of Axmouth, father of John Drake (died 1558) of Ash, in the parish of Musbury. Jane was thus 3rd cousin of Sir John Drake (died 1636) of Ash, the father of Sir John Drake, 1st Baronet (died 1669), whose sister was Elizabeth Drake, mother of John Churchill, 1st Duke of Marlborough (1650–1722). Sir John Drake, 1st Baronet (died 1669) was John Prince's godfather, and one of Prince's Worthies was Sir Bernard Drake (died 1586) of Ash, son of John Drake (died 1558).

== Career ==
He was educated at Brasenose College, Oxford, and became curate of Bideford. He then became minister of St. Martin's Church in Exeter. He was vicar of St Mary's Church, Totnes from 1675 until 1681, when, at the invitation of the Duke of Somerset, he was made vicar of St Mary's Church, Berry Pomeroy, a post he held for over forty years. Here he seems to have authorised much building work, as the church and vicarage have several period features.

== The Worthies of Devon ==
While at Berry Pomeroy, Prince worked on his magnum opus: a biography of his home county's many notable figures, which he probably finished in 1697. The book ran to 600 pages, with woodcuts to illustrate the 191 biographies, and he struggled to get it published because most publishers able to handle such a large book were based in London or Oxbridge. Funding was also a problem, as a scandal (see below) had temporarily deprived him of his living. The printer was forced to advertise for subscribers, while the book languished for four years. It was first published in 1701 under the title,

Danmonii Orientales Illustres: or, the Worthies of Devon. A work, wherein the lives and fortunes of the most famous divines, statesmen, swordsmen, physicians, writers, and other eminent persons, natives of that most noble province from before the Norman Conquest, down to the present age, are memorised, in an alphabetical order out of the most approved authors, both in print and manuscript. In which an account is given, not only of divers very deserving persons, (many of which were never hitherto made publick) but of several antient and noble families; their seats and habitations; the distance they bear to the next great towns; their coats of arms fairly cut; with other things, no less profitable, than pleasant and delightful.

The Dumnonii, Danmonii or Dumnones were a British Celtic tribe which inhabited Dumnonia, the peninsula now containing in its west the county of Cornwall and in its east Devon. Prince's Latin title signifies "Illustrious Eastern Dumnonii".

It is evident that Prince was over-ambitious in his work. The alphabetical entries from A to H fill half the book, while L to Z are squeezed into the final quarter, as money problems took their toll on his inclusions. A second volume, detailing 115 entries chosen by Prince to redress the balance, was never published, though a manuscript exists in the Devon Record Office. This manuscript was discussed, and its biographies listed, by J. Brooking-Rowe in an article in the 1900 volume of the Transactions of the Devonshire Association.

== Editions ==
A further edition was published in 1810 by Edward Upham, Exeter and Longman and Hurst, Rees and Orme, London, printed for Rees and Curtis, Plymouth. It was inscribed to "The Right Hon. Hugh, Earl Fortescue, Viscount Ebrington and Baron Fortescue of Castle Hill, Lord-Lieutenant and Custos Rotulorum of the County of Devon", whose "ancestors claim a distinguished place" in the work. It was funded by subscription, with a list of subscribers included after the list of contents.

== Marriage ==
Prince married Gertrude Salter (1644–1725), youngest daughter of Anthony Salter, a physician of Exeter, by his wife Gertrude Acland, a daughter of John Acland (died 1641), of the parish of St Olave, Exeter, Mayor of Exeter in 1627. Prince included in his "Worthies" an uncle and a great-uncle of his wife. John Acland was the 2nd son of Baldwin Acland (died 1572) of Hawkridge, Chittlehampton, a junior branch of the later prominent Acland family which originated at Acland, Landkey, North Devon, later seated at Killerton. Gertrude Acland's eldest brother was Baldwin Acland (1607–1672), Treasurer of Exeter Cathedral, whom Prince made one of his "Worthies of Devon", which biography he termed a "slender monument to the memory of a good man and a worthy divine". Gertrude's mother was Elizabeth Duck, sister of Nicholas Duck (1570–1628), Recorder of Exeter, whom Prince also made one of his Worthies, whose biography also contained a substantial biography of her other younger brother Arthur Duck (1580–1649), a lawyer and MP.

=== Sexual scandal ===
In 2001 Todd Gray published the court depositions of Prince's church trial as The Curious Sexual Adventure of the Reverend John Prince, which awakened interest in Prince. It was while serving as vicar of Berry Pomeroy that a scandal occurred. In April 1699, Prince arranged a meeting with a local woman, Mary Southcote, in the back room of an inn. Their dalliance was witnessed through a broken window, they were interrupted, and a court case followed later that year. However, despite many statements against him, Prince was allowed to keep his post (from which he had been suspended), as the main witnesses were deemed to be unreliable. He returned to Berry Pomeroy and lived out his years as vicar. A plaque in St Mary's Church in Totnes states that he was well connected, and it is possible that the trial was set up by his enemies. The records of the trial were hitherto unpublished, partly due to the coarse language used by some of the witnesses; it was not until the modern age that such language became less shocking and could be included in a popular work. In 2005 the book was adapted as a play, The Tale of John Prince, which was performed by the South Devon Players theatre company in 2006, at two venues relevant to the story: The Seven Sisters Hotel in Totnes (next door to the former site of Angel's inn); and also in Berry Pomeroy Church.

== Sources ==
- Prince, John The Worthies of Devon, A new edition, with notes. London: Printed for Rees and Curtis, Plymouth; Edward Upham, Exeter; and Longman, Hurst, Rees, and Orme, London, 1810.
- Vivian, Lt.Col. J.L., (Ed.) The Visitations of the County of Devon: Comprising the Heralds' Visitations of 1531, 1564 & 1620, Exeter, 1895.
