= List of mayors of Exeter =

This is a chronological list of those who have served as Mayor of Exeter (and from 2002 as Lord Mayor), in the city of Exeter, England.

== Mayors of Exeter ==
Year appointed	Name	Terms	Monarch
1200, 1201, 1202, 1203, 1204, 1205, 1206:	Henry Rifford	7	King John
c.1207, 1266	William Durling (Derling or Dirling in some references)	2	King John
c.1207, 1208, 1209, 1210, 1211, 1212	John FitzRobert	6	King John
1213, 1214, 1215	William Blondy	3	King John
1216, 1219, 1220, 1224. 1225, 1227, 1228, 1232, 1236	Walter Turbert	9	Henry III
1217, 1221, 1222, 1226, 1229, 1230, 1235	Roger FitzHenry	7	Henry III
1218, 1223, 1231, 1239	Walter Gervase	4	Henry III
1233, 1255, 1257, 1258	Hillary Blondy	4	Henry III
1234, 1237, 1238, 1240, 1241, 1242, 1243, 1245, 1247, 1249, 1252	Martin Roff	11	Henry III
1244, 1246, 1250, 1251, 1253	Adam Rifford	5	Henry III
1248	Walter Hastment	1	Henry III
1254	John Okeston	1	Henry III
1256, 1259, 1264	Philip Dyer	3	Henry III
1260, 1262, 1265, 1268	Walter Okeston	4	Henry III
1261	Hilary White	1	Henry III
1263, 1267	Nicholas Ilchester	1	Henry III
1269, 1275, 1276, 1278, 1280, 1281, 1283, 1284	Alphred Duport - Executed after last period of office due to dereliction of duty	8	Henry III/Edward I
1270, 1271, 1272, 1274, 1282	Martin Dirling	4	Henry III/Edward I
1273	Richard Geythen	1	Edward I
1277, 1279	John Feniton	2	Edward I
1285, 1286	David Tayler	2	Edward I
1287, 1288, 1290, 1291, 1294, 1295	John Zouch	6	Edward I
1289	Richard Allen	1	Edward I
1292, 1300, 1307, 1312	William Gatepath	4	
1293, 1296, 1297, 1298	Richard Tantifer	3	Edward I
1299	John Horn	1	Edward I
1301	William Tantifer	1	
1302, 1305, 1306, 1308, 1309, 1313, 1314, 1317	Roger Beynim	8	Edward I/Edward II
1303, 1304	Roger Wheaton	2	Edward I
1310	Walter Tantifer	1	Edward II
1311	Waltor Langdon	1	Edward II
1315, 1316, 1318, 1319, 1320, 1324, 1325, 1326, 1328, 1329, 1331	Philip Lovecock	9	Edward II
1321	William Wotton	1	Edward II
1322, 1323	Robert Wotton	2	Edward II
1327	Richard Soller	1	Edward III
1330, 1332, 1334	Martin Lekenn	3	Edward III
1333, 1337	Thomas Gervis	2	Edward III
1335, 1336, 1338, 1340, 1341, 1344, 1345, 1347	Henry Hughton (or Haughton)	8	Edward III
1339	Thomas Lichfield	1	Edward III
1342	Robert Furbor	1	Edward III
1343, 1346	Thomas Furbor	2	Edward III
1348	Nicholas Halberton	1	Edward III
1349, 1350, 1351, 1352, 1355	Robert Bridport	4	Edward III
1353, 1354, 1357, 1359, 1360	John Spicer	5	Edward III
1356, 1361, 1362, 1363, 1364, 1372	John Gyst (or Gist)	5	Edward III
1358	Robert Nolle	1	Edward III
1365	Nicholas Taverner	1	Edward III
1366, 1367	Nicholas Brydestow	2	Edward III
1368	Warren Bayliff	1	Edward III
1369, 1371, 1373	Roger Plenty	3	Edward III
1370	Martin Battishill	1	Edward III
1374, 1375, 1377, 1378, 1379, 1382, 1384, 1386, 1388, 1390, 1392, 1394	Robert Wilsford	12	Edward III/Richard II
1376, 1380, 1399	John Grey	3	Edward III/Richard II
1381	John Nymett	1	Richard II
1383, 1396	John Talbot	2	Richard II
1385, 1397, 1407, 1410	Adam Scut	4	Richard II
1387, 1389, 1391, 1393, 1409	Richard Bosom	5	Richard II
1395, 1398, 1405	Simon Grendon	3	Richard II
1400, 1402, 1404, 1406, 1408, 1411, 1412	William Wilsford	7	Henry IV
1401	William Oke	1	Henry IV
1403	Henry Hull	1	Henry IV
1413, 1415	Peter Sturt	2	King Henry V
1414, 1419, 1422, 1426	Thomas Easton	4	King Henry V
1414	John Lake	1	King Henry V
1415, 1419, 1420, 1422, 1423, 1426, 1427	Thomas Eston	8	King Henry V/Henry VI
1416, 1417, 1418, 1420, 1423	John Batten	5	King Henry V/Henry VI
1417, 1421, 1424	John Cook	3	King Henry V/Henry VI
1425	Robert Vessy (or Voysey)	1	Henry VI
1427, 1430, 1437, 1445	John Hull	4	Henry VI
1428, 1429, 1444, 1446	John Shillingford	4	Henry VI
1430, 1434, 1439	William Cook	3	Henry VI
1432, 1435, 1441	Thomas Cook	3	Henry VI
1433	John Salter	1	Henry VI
1436, 1442, 1448	John Cutler alias Carwithan	3	Henry VI
1438	Bennet Drew	1	Henry VI
1440	William Upton	1	Henry VI
1443, 1449, 1451, 1453, 1455, 1462, 1464, 1466, 1470, 1474	Hugh Germin	10	Henry VI
1450	William Crymell	1	Henry VI
1452	Walter Pope	1	Henry VI
1454	Richard Oreng	1	Henry VI
1456, 1460	William Duke	2	Henry VI
1457, 1461, 1477	John Kelly	3	Henry VI
1458, 1463, 1465, 1481	Richard Druell	4	Henry VI/Edward IV
1459	John Betty	1	Henry VI
1467, 1480, 1486	Thomas Calwoodley	3	Edward IV
1468	John Hamlyn	1	Edward IV
1469	Robert Smith	1	Edward IV
1471	Richard Jeffery	1	Edward IV
1472, 1488	Richard Clerk	2	Edward IV
1473	Richard Rumwell	1	Edward IV
1475	John Oreng	1	Edward IV
1476, 1479, 1483, 1492, 1496	John Atwill	5	Edward IV/Richard III
1478, 1494	William Obleigh	2	Edward IV
1482	Roger Worth	1	Edward IV
1484	Matthew Jubb	1	Richard III
1485	Robert Russell	1	Henry VII
1487, 1503	Robert Newton	2	Henry VII
1489	Stephen Rudgway or Ridgeway	1	Henry VII
1490	John Hooker	1	Henry VII
1491	Robert Chubb	1	Henry VII
1493	John Colshill	1	Henry VII
1495, 1501, 1507	John Calwoodleigh of Calwoodleigh	3	Henry VII
1497	William Frost	1	Henry VII
1498	Richard Undy	1	Henry VII
1499	Nicholas Hamlyn	1	Henry VII
1500	Walter York	1	Henry VII
1502	Walter Champneys	1	Henry VII
1504, 1510	Thomas Andrew	1	Henry VII
1505, 1515, 1518	William Crudg	1	Henry VII/Henry VIII
1506, 1513	Richard Hewet (or Hewett)	2	Henry VII/Henry VIII
1508	John Limpenny	1	Henry VII
1509, 1516	John Buckenam	2	Henry VIII
1510	Thomas Andrew	1	Henry VIII
1511	William Wilsford	1	Henry VIII
1512	Richard Symons	1	Henry VIII
1514	John Moor	1	Henry VIII
1517, 1523 (interim), 1537	Thomas Hunt	2	Henry VIII
1519	Jeffery Lewes	1	Henry VIII
1520	John Broadmere	1	Henry VIII
1521	John Noseworthy (or Nosworthy)	1	Henry VIII
1522	Richard Duke	1	Henry VIII
1523	John Simon (or Symons) - died shortly after his election, with Thomas Hunt taking on interim duties	1	Henry VIII
1523-4, 1535, 1545, 1551, 1561	William Hurst	6	Henry VIII
1525	William Bennet	1	Henry VIII
1526, 1538	Henry Hamlyn	2	Henry VIII
1527, 1534, 1546	John Britnall	3	Henry VIII
1528	Robert Buller	1	Henry VIII
1529	Robert Hooker (died 1537)	1	Henry VIII
1530, 1536, 1548	John Blackaller	3	Henry VIII
1531, 1539	Gilbert Kirk	2	Henry VIII
1532	William Peryam	1	Henry VIII
1533	Richard Martin	1	Henry VIII
1540	Thomas Spurway	1	Henry VIII
1541	William Buckenam	1	Henry VIII
1542, 1558	John Buller	2	Henry VIII
1543	Robert Tooker	1	Henry VIII
1544, 1550	Thomas Prestwood	2	Henry VIII
1547, 1554	John Midwinter	2	Edward VI
1549	John Tuckfield	1	Edward VI
1552	William Tothill	1	Edward VI
1553	William Smith	1	Mary I
1555, 1564	Moris Levermore	2	Mary I
1556	Walter Staplehead (or Staplehill)	1	Mary I
1557, 1562, 1575	John Peter	3	Mary I/Elizabeth I
1559	Robert Midwinteo	1	Elizabeth I
1560	John Blackall	1	Elizabeth I
1563, 1572, 1587, 1598	John Peryam	4	Elizabeth I
1565	John Wolcott (or Woolcott)	1	Elizabeth I
1566	Thomas Richardson	1	Elizabeth I
1567	John Smythe (or Smith)	1	Elizabeth I
1568	Robert Chaff	1	Elizabeth I
1569, 1579	William Chappel	2	Elizabeth I
1570	Simon Knight	1	Elizabeth I
1571, 1580	Thomas Bruerton	2	Elizabeth I
1573	William Tryvett	1	Elizabeth I
1574	Nicholas Martin	1	Elizabeth I
1576	Thomas Prestwood	1	Elizabeth I
1577	George Peryman	1	Elizabeth I
1578, 1589	Richard Prowse	2	Elizabeth I
1581, 1618	Thomas Martin	2	Elizabeth I
1582, 1591	Michael Germin	2	Elizabeth I
1583	Jeffery Thomas	1	Elizabeth I
1584, 1594, 1604	John Davy	3	Elizabeth I
1585, 1631	Nicholas Martin	2	Elizabeth I
1586, 1597, 1607	George Smith	3	Elizabeth I
1588	Thomas Chappell	1	Elizabeth I
1590, 1600	Wiliam Martin	2	Elizabeth I
1592, 1603, 1619, 1644	Nicholas Spicer	4	Elizabeth I
1593	Thomas Spicer	1	Elizabeth I
1595	John Chappell	1	Elizabeth I
1597	John Levermore	1	Elizabeth I
1599	John Howell	1	Elizabeth I
1601, 1614, 1625, 1667	Thomas Walker	4	Elizabeth I/James I
1602	Richard Beavis	1	Elizabeth I
1605	Henry Hull	1	James I
1606	Richard Dorchester	1	James I
1608, 1619	John Prowse	2	James I
1609, 1620	Hugh Crossing	2	James I
1610, 1621	Walter Borough	2	James I
1611	John Lant	1	James I
1612	William Newcomb	1	James I
1613	Jeffery Waltham	1	James I
1615	John Marshall	1	James I
1616	John Sheer	1	James I
1617	Ignatius Jourden	1	James I
1622	John Modyford	1	James I
1623	John Gupwill	1	James I
1624, 1637	Thomas Crossing	2	James I/Charles I
1626	John Tayler	1	Charles I
1627	John Acland	1	Charles I
1628	John Lynn	1	Charles I
1630	Thomes Flay	1	Charles I
1632	John Hakewill	1	Charles I
1633	Gilbert Sweet	1	Charles I
1634	Francis Crossing	1	Charles I
1635, 1647, 1649 (deputising)	Adam Bennet	2	Charles I
1636	Roger Mallock	1	Charles I
1638	James Tucker	1	Charles I
1639	Robert Walker, MP for Exeter	1	Charles I
1640	John Penny	1	Charles I
1641	Richard Saunders	1	Charles I
1642	Christopher Clark	1	Charles I
1643	Sir Hugh Crocker	1	Charles I
1645	John Cupper	1	Charles I
1646	Walter White	1	Charles I
1648	James Gould	1	Charles I
1649, 1654	Richard Crossing was elected but refused to serve in 1649 due to the overthrow of the King, with Adam Bennet deputising	2	Interregnum
1650	Richard Evans	1	Interregnum
1651	Richard Sweet	1	Interregnum
1652	Ralph Hermn	1	Interregnum
1653	Simon Snow, MP for Exeter	1	Interregnum
1655	Nicholas Brooking	1	Interregnum
1656	Thomas Ford	1	Interregnum
1657	James Pearse	1	Interregnum
1658	James Marshall	1	Interregnum
1659	Christopher Clark Junior	1	Interregnum
1660	Christopher Lethbridge (d.1670)	1	Charles II
1661, 1672	Henry Gandy	2	Charles II
1662	John Martin initially refused to serve, but did so after instructed by the King	1	Charles II
1663	John Butler	1	Charles II
1664	Alan Penny	1	Charles II
1665	Nicholas Isacke	1	Charles II
1666	John Acland	1	Charles II
1668	George Tuthill	1	Charles II
1669	Peter Hagedot	1	Charles II
1670	Sir Benjamin Oliver	1	Charles II
1671	William Sanford	1	Charles II
1673, 1681	Isaac Mawditt	2	Charles II
1674	Christopher Brodridge	1	Charles II
1675	John Par	1	Charles II
1676	William Glyde	1	Charles II
1677	George Tuthill	1	Charles II
1678	William Sandford	1	Charles II
1679	John Collyns	1	Charles II
1680	Henry Smyth	1	Charles II
1682	Endymion Walker Esq	1	Charles II
1683	Christopher Broadridge (or Brodridge)	1	Charles II
1684	James Walker	1	Charles II
1685, 1694	Robert Dabynott	2	James II/William III & Mary II
1686	George Saffin	1	James II
1687, 1689, 1700	John Snell	3	James II/William III & Mary II
1688	Sir Thomas Jefford	1	James II
1690	Edward Cross	1	William III & Mary II
1691	Edward Seward (or Seaward), knight. His portrait was painted by William Gandy.	1	William III & Mary II
1692	Christopher Coke	1	William III & Mary II
1693, 1702, 1714	John Gandy	3	William III & Mary II/Anne/George I
1695	Christopher Bale	1	William III & Mary II
1697	John Curson	1	William III & Mary II
1698, 1718	John Burell	2	William III & Mary II/George I
1699, 1711	Joshua Hickman	2	William III & Mary II
1701	John Cholwill	1	William III & Mary II
1703	John Newcombe	1	Anne
1704	Gilbert Wood	1	Anne
1705	Thomas Baron	1	Anne
1706	Nicholas Wood	1	Anne
1707	Edward Daly	1	Anne
1708	Edward Spicer	1	Anne
1709	Edward Collins	1	Anne
1710	Thomas Salter	1	Anne
1712	Jacob Rowe	1	Anne
1715	William Sandford	1	George I
1716, 1730	Nathaniel Dewdney	2	George I/George II
1717	Philip Pear	1	George I
1719	Thomas Coplestone	1	George I
1720	William Gandy	1	George I
1721	John Phillips	1	George I
1722	Thomas Salter	1	George I
1723	Philip Russell	1	George I
1724	Humphrey Bawden	1	George I
1725	Anthony Tripe	1	George I
1726	Emanuel Hole	1	George I
1727	John Elston	1	George II
1728	Robert Lydston	1	George II
1729	William Stabback	1	George II
1731	Ethelred Davy	1	George II
1732	Richard Vivian	1	George II
1733, 1736	Samuel Symons	2	George II
1734	John Newcombe	1	George II
1735, 1746	Matthew Spry	2	George II
1737	Arthur Culme	1	George II
1738, 1749	Thomas Heath	2	George II
1739	Nicholas Blake	1	George II
1740, 1751, 1752 (deputising)	Nicholas Lee - took over from Robert Dodge for remainder of 1752 term	2 (3)	George II
1741	William Newcombe	1	George II
1742	Nicholas Medland	1	George II
1743	Philip Elston	1	George II
1744	John Hawker	1	George II
1745, 1761 (deputising)	Francis Brayne	1 (2)	George II
1747	John Manley	1	George II
1748, 1755	Lewis Portbury	2	George II
1750, 1756	William Trosse	2	George II
1752	Robert Dodge - September to November (replaced by Nicholas Lee)	1	George II
1753	John Luckett	1	George II
1754	Nicholas Arthur	1	George II
1757	Joseph Elliot	1	George II
1758	Richard Densham	1	George II
1759	Richard Jackson	1	George II
1760	Samuel Pearce	1	George III
1761	Samuel Dix - Until Jan 1762, replaced by Francis Brayne	1	George III
1762, 1767 (deputising)	James Crossing	1 (2)	George III
1763	Edward Walker	1	George III
1764	Jacob Fowe	1	George III
1765, 1782	John Bussell	2	George III
1766	Humphry Hill	1	George III
1767	William Jollin - until Feb 1768, replaced by James Crossing	1	George III
1768	Philip Dacie	1	George III
1769, 1777	Thomas Dodge	2	George III
1770	John Flound	1	George III
1771	Thomas Coffon	1	George III
1772	Gregory Jackson	1	George III
1773	Henry Kitson	1	George III
1774	John Dennis	1	George III
1775	John Eiles Pier	1	George III
1776	Charles Edwards	1	George III
1778	James Grant	1	George III
1779	Charles Furlong	1	George III
1780	Samuel Moore	1	George III
1783	William Ibert	1	George III
1784	Benjamin Horyce Walker	1	George III
1785	George Westlake	1	George III
1786	Nicholas Elias Cosserat	1	George III
1787	Richard Jenkin	1	George III
1788	Jonathan Burnett	1	George III
1789	William Pate	1	George III
1790	Edward Raguener	1	George III
1791	Reuben Phillips	1	George III
1792, 1803	John Pinhey	2	George III
1793	Richard Chamberlain	1	George III
1794	Richard Hart	1	George III
1795	John Balle	1	George III
1796	Charles Upham	1	George III
1797	John Brake	1	George III
1798, 1808	Joseph Gattey	2	George III
1799	Jonathan Worthy	1	George III
1800	Richard Jenkin	1	George III
1801, 1818	Thomas Floud	2	George III
1802, 1807	Charles Collyns	2	George III
1804	Joseph Greenway	1	George III
1805	John Thomas Wright	1	George III
1806, 1816	Samuel White	2	George III
1809	Edward Upham	1	George III
1810	John Hore	1	George III
1811	William Lee	1	George III
1812	Benjamin Wm Johnson	1	George III
1813	Burnet Patch	1	George III
1814, 1826	John Hart	2	George III/George IV
1815	John William Williams	1	George III
1817	Charles Brake	1	George III
1819, 1827, 1832	Henry Blackall	3	George III/George IV/William IV
1820, 1829	Robert Rogers Sanders	2	George IV
1821	George Galloway	1	George IV
1822	John Harris	1	George IV
1823	William Crockett	1	George IV
1824	Humphry Hill Pinhey	1	George IV
1825	William Payne	1	George IV
1828	John Haddy Jones	1	George IV
1830	Paul Measor	1	William IV
1831, 1836	William Kennaway	1	William IV
1833, 1845	Edward Woolmer	2	William IV/Queen Victoria
1834, 1835	Philip Chilwell de la Garde - Sep-Dec when Chamber replaced with Council, then elected Jan-Nov 1835	2	William IV
1835	Samuel Kingdon Junior	1	William IV
1837, 1838	William John Players Wilkinson	2	Queen Victoria
1839	Edward MacGowan	1	Queen Victoria
1840	William Drewe	1	Queen Victoria
1841	John Crew Carew	1	Queen Victoria
1842	Charles Henry Turner	1	Queen Victoria
1843	William Page Kingdon	1	Queen Victoria
1844, 1858	Henry Hooper	2	Queen Victoria
1846	Charles Brutton	1	Queen Victoria
1847	William Denis Moore	1	Queen Victoria
1848	Thomas Shapter	1	Queen Victoria
1849	Christopher Arden	1	Queen Victoria
1850	Edward Andrew Sanders	1	Queen Victoria
1851, 1852	William Wills Hooper	2	Queen Victoria
1853	Robert Stribling Cornish	1	Queen Victoria
1854, 1855	John Daw	2	Queen Victoria
1856	Thomas G Norris	1	Queen Victoria
1857	William Buckingham	1	Queen Victoria
1859	Thomas Tanner	1	Queen Victoria
1860	Thomas E Drake	1	Queen Victoria
1861	William Kendall	1	Queen Victoria
1862	William Barnes	1	Queen Victoria
1863	Thomas Maitland Snow	1	Queen Victoria
1864, 1865, 1866	Robert Thomas Head	3	Queen Victoria
1867	John Trehane	1	Queen Victoria
1868	Henry Samuel Ellis	1	Queen Victoria
1869	Richard James Norman King	1	Queen Victoria
1870	Bartholomew Charles Gidley	1	Queen Victoria
1871	Joseph Handing	1	Queen Victoria
1872, 1873	Charles John Follett	2	Queen Victoria
1874	Horace Charles Lloyd	1	Queen Victoria
1875	Henry Wilcocks	1	Queen Victoria
1876	William Cuthbertson	1	Queen Victoria
1877	Henry Drew Thomas	1	Queen Victoria
1878, 1879	William Horton Ellis	1	Queen Victoria
1880	Walter Pring	1	Queen Victoria
1881	Thomas Andrew	1	Queen Victoria
1882	Samuel Jones	1	Queen Victoria
1883	Robert Carne Wilkinson	1	Queen Victoria
1884	William Brown	1	Queen Victoria
1885	Richard Rendle Miller Daw	1	Queen Victoria
1886	Arthur Burch	1	Queen Victoria
1887	Charles Tanner Kingdon Roberts	1	Queen Victoria
1888	William Peters	1	Queen Victoria
1889	Thomas Snow	1	Queen Victoria
1890	Charles Edwin Ware	1	Queen Victoria
1891	Edward Holroyd Houlditch	1	Queen Victoria
1892	Henry Frederick Willey	1	Queen Victoria
1893	Edward James Domville	1	Queen Victoria
1894	Alfred Robert Steele	1	Queen Victoria
1895, 1896, 1897	Robert Pople	3	Queen Victoria
1898	Samuel Ward	1	Queen Victoria
1899	Hubert Palmer Osborne Hamlin	1	Queen Victoria
1900, 1901	Albert Edward Dunn	2	Queen Victoria/Edward VII
1902	Charles Edward Rowe (Liberal)	1	Edward VII
1903	Frederick John Widgery	1	Edward VII
1904	Edwin Charles Perry	1	Edward VII
1905	Thomas Linscott	1	Edward VII
1906	William Henry Reed	1	Edward VII
1907	Henry Gadd	1	Edward VII
1908	James George Commin	1	Edward VII
1909	Henry Hugh Wippell	1	Edward VII
1910	Alfred Thomas Loram	1	George V
1911	Charles James Vlieland	1	George V
1912, 1931	Henry William Michelmore	2	George V
1913	William Kendall King	1	George V
1914, 1915, 1916, 1917	James George Owen	4	George V
1918	Sir James George Owen	1	George V
1919	Thomas Bradley Rowe	1	George V
1920	Arthur Charles Roper	1	George V
1921, 1922, 1923	Philip Foale Rowsell		
1924	Arthur Northcote Pitts	1	George V
1925	William Brock	1	George V
1926	Ransom Pickard	1	George V
1927	Arthur Ernest Brock	1	George V
1928	John Shirley Steele-Perkins	1	George V
1929	Harold Charles Rowe	1	George V
1930	Charles Warren	1	George V
1932	Kenneth Gatey	1	George V
1933	Thomas John Wembridge Templeman	1	George V
1934	James William Ackroyd	1	George V
1935	Percy Rufus Gayton	1	George V
1936	Alfred Anstey	1	Edward VIII
1937	Reginald John Rew	1	George VI
1938, 1939, 1940, 1941, 1942, 1943	Rowland Glave Saunders	6	George VI
1944	Vincent Thompson	1	George VI
1945	Francis Henry Tarr	1	George VI
1946	William Outon Wills	1	George VI
1947, 1948	William "Potato Pete" Slader	2	George VI
1949	William Godwin Michelmore	1	George VI
1950	John Geoffrey Rowe Orchard	1	George VI
1951	Frederick Peter Cottey	1	George VI
1952	Richard Wayland Smith	1	Elizabeth II
1953	Alfred James Bovey	1	Elizabeth II
1954	Charles William Holcombe Hill	1	Elizabeth II
1955	Gilbert John Greenslade	1	Elizabeth II
1956	Clifford James Fuller	1	Elizabeth II
1957	Ronald Hay Creasy	1	Elizabeth II
1958	Charles Rew	1	Elizabeth II
1959	Charles Woodland	1	Elizabeth II
1960	Philip Francis Brooks	1	Elizabeth II
1961	Alfred Peter Steele-Perkins	1	Elizabeth II
1962	Kenneth Charles Harold Rowe	1	Elizabeth II
1963	Walter George Daw	1	Elizabeth II
1964	Patrick Allan Spoerer	1	Elizabeth II
1965	James Lethley Smeall	1	Elizabeth II
1966	Minnie Nichols - first female mayor	1	Elizabeth II
1967	Ronald Edward Charles Board	1	Elizabeth II
1968	John Belsey Martin	1	Elizabeth II
1969	William James Hallett	1	Elizabeth II
1970	Percy Hilton	1	Elizabeth II
1971	Herbert Samuel Sargent	1	Elizabeth II
1972	Gordon Anthony Joy	1	Elizabeth II
1973	Ernest Charles Lovelace Tozer until 30 March 1974- last Mayor of the City and County of Exeter	1	Elizabeth II
1974	Walter George Daw - from 1 April to 2 April	1	Elizabeth II
1974	Samuel Honeywill - from 2 April	1	Elizabeth II
1975	William Peter Hutchings	1	Elizabeth II
1976	John Frederick Landers	1	Elizabeth II
1977	Roger John Keast	1	Elizabeth II
1978	Norman William Francis Long	1	Elizabeth II
1979	Richard John Van Oppen	1	Elizabeth II
1980	Joan Margaret Richardson	1	Elizabeth II
1981	Ivy Maud Johns	1	Elizabeth II
1982	Patricia Spencer	1	Elizabeth II
1983	Raymond Edward Robert Long	1	Elizabeth II
1984	James Pollitt	1	Elizabeth II
1985	Roy Slack	1	Elizabeth II
1986	Alan Williamson	1	Elizabeth II
1987	William Henry John Rowe	1	Elizabeth II
1988	Michael James O'Callaghan	1	Elizabeth II
1989	Diana Winifred Pamela Sutton Bess	1	Elizabeth II
1990	George Clark	1	Elizabeth II
1991	Anthony Fry	1	Elizabeth II
1992	Yolanda Henson	1	Elizabeth II
1993	Martin Rich	1	Elizabeth II
1994	Ramon Yeo	1	Elizabeth II
1995	Margaret Midgeley	1	Elizabeth II
1996	Ian Mitchell	1	Elizabeth II
1997	John Holman	1	Elizabeth II
1998	Barry McNamara	1	Elizabeth II
1999	Roy Hill	1	Elizabeth II
2000	Mary Evans	1	Elizabeth II
2001	Granville Baldwin	1	Elizabeth II

== Lord Mayors of Exeter ==
- 2001: Granville Baldwin – first Lord Mayor
- 2002: Val Dixon
- 2003: Margaret Danks
- 2004: Hilda Sterry
- 2005: Peter Wadham
- 2006: Norman Shiel
- 2007: Hazel Slack – runs a nursery shop in the city.
- 2008: Paul Smith
- 2009: John Winterbottom – former financial adviser.
- 2010: Marcel Choules – has been a fairground booth fighter, bouncer and chef.
- 2011: Stella Brock
- 2012: Rob Newby
- 2013: Rachel Lyons – former nurse
- 2014: Percy Prowse
- 2015: Olwen Margaret Foggin
- 2016: Cynthia Thompson
- 2017: Lesley Robson
- 2018: Rob Hannaford
- 2019: Peter Holland - former headteacher and postman.
- 2021: Trish Oliver
- 2022: Yolonda Henson
- 2023: Kevin Mitchell
