= Exeter Quay =

Quay in Devon, England

Coordinates: 50.718°N 3.530°W

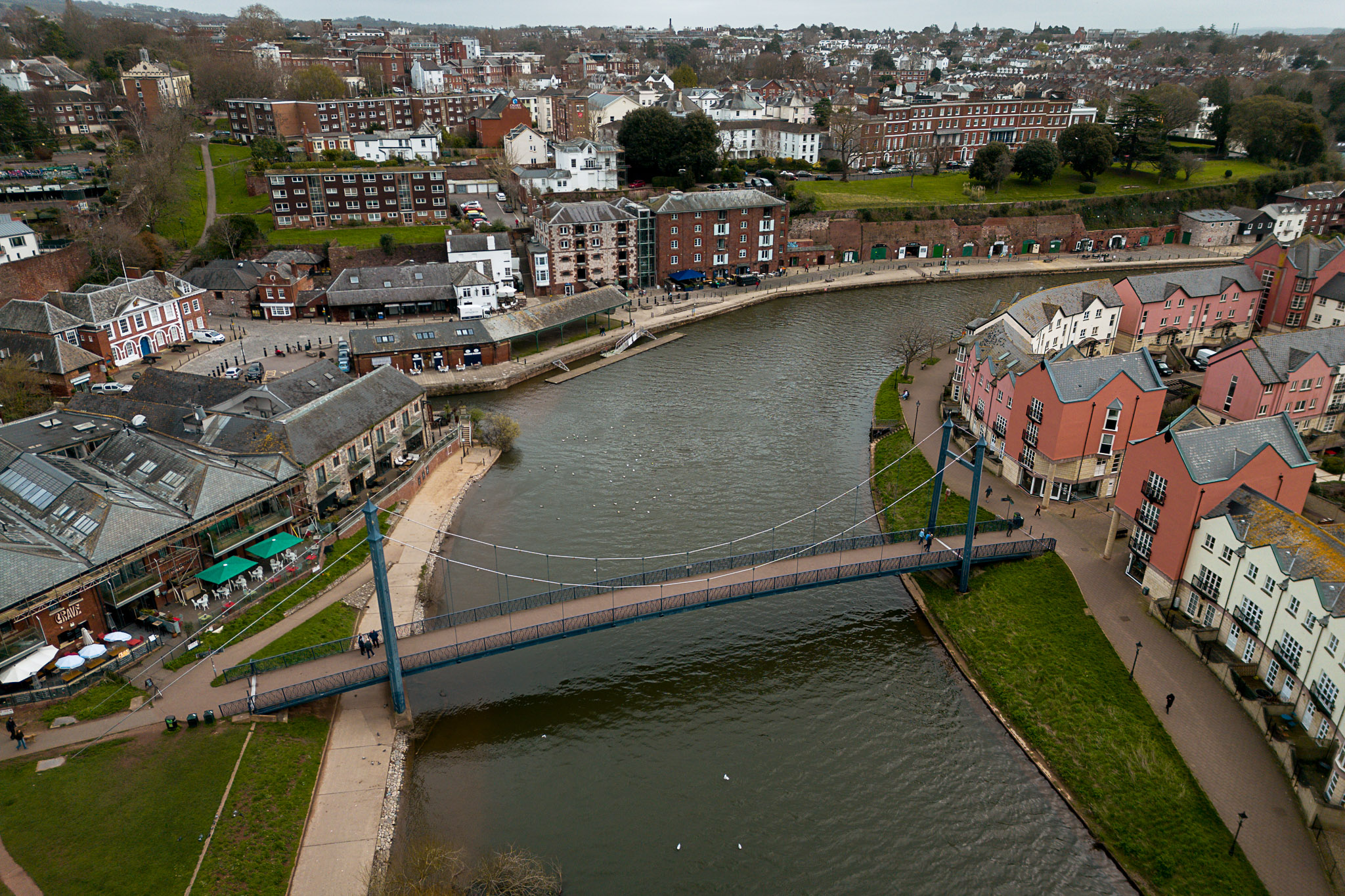
Exeter Quay

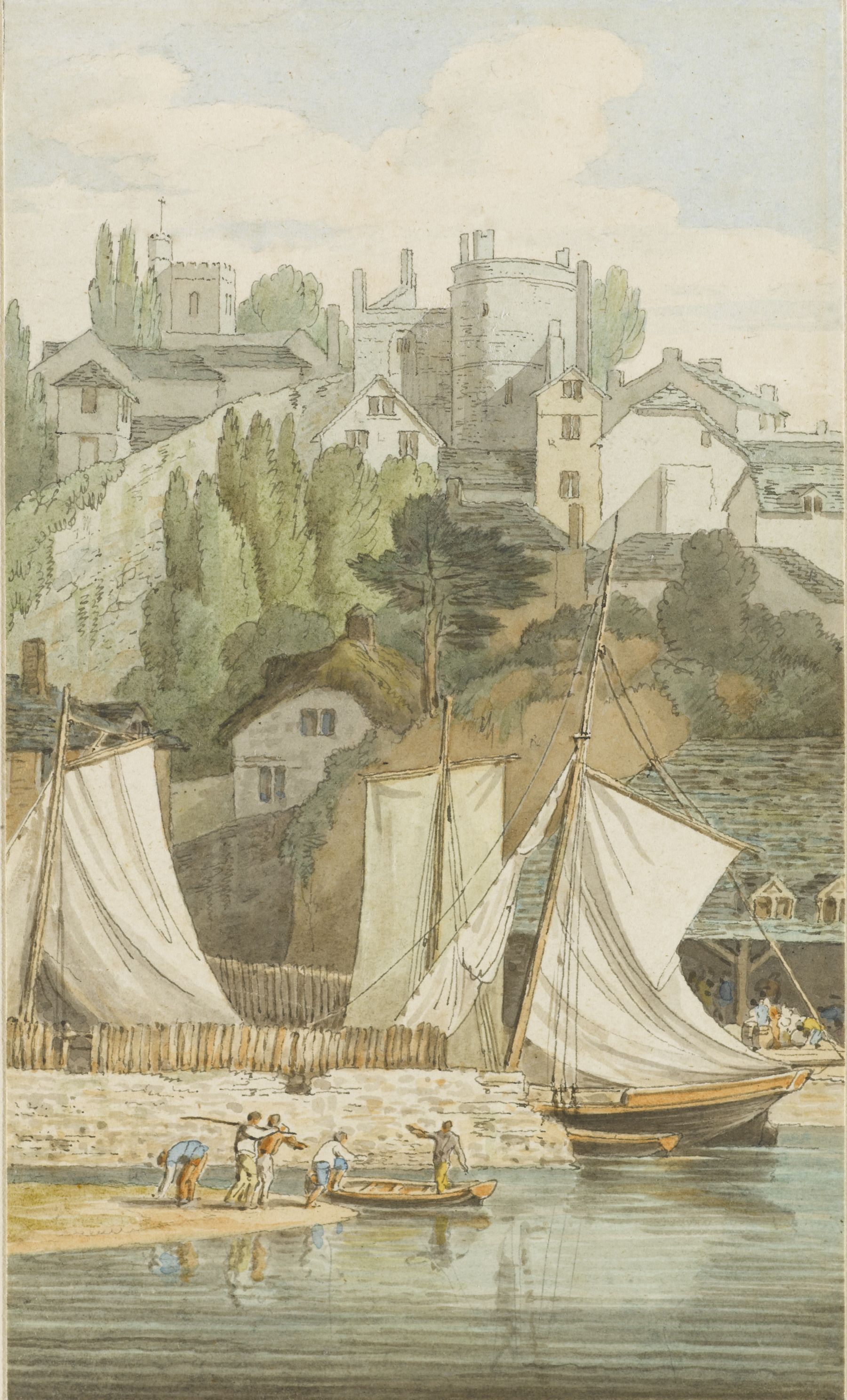
'Near the Quay' between 1800 and 1810, Watercolor on paper by John White Abbott

Exeter Quay, also known as Exeter Quayside, is a part of the city of Exeter next to the River Exe and the Exeter Ship Canal. It was first used as a port in prehistoric times when a sandstone ledge was used to unload the ships of overseas traders. However, by 1381 the Countess Weir had blocked the river to shipping. In 1566 a canal was completed to provide access for ships. Over time the number of ships using the quayside increased and so the quay was expanded in the late 17th century. Further expansion occurred in 1830 when a new canal basin was dug. However, in 1840 the railways reached Exeter and the shipping began to decline. No longer used for shipping, the quayside is now mostly used for leisure.

A manually operated cable ferry known as the Butts Ferry crosses the Exe at Exeter Quayside.

== Events ==
The following is a list of events that Quay hosts every year: Dragon Boat Racing, Canoe shows and races, Exeter Street Food Night Markets, Quayside Red Coat Guided Tours, Inside Outside Summer Craft Fair, and the Exe Descent.
