= Exeter Ship Canal =

Canal in the United Kingdom

Exeter Canal
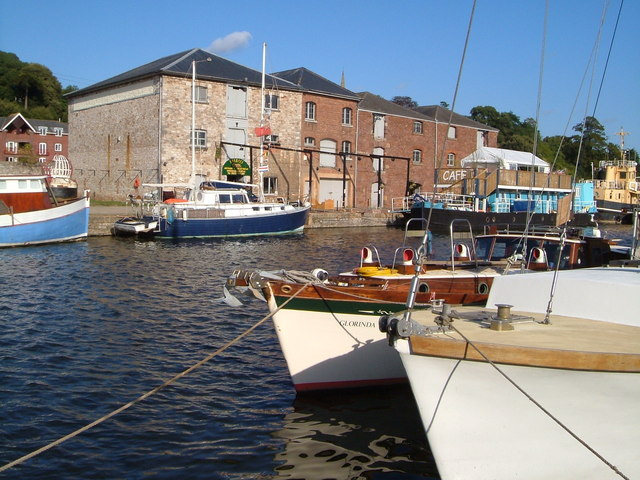
- Boats moored in Exeter Canal basin
- Location: Beside the River Exe
- Country: England

Specifications
- Lock length: 122 ft (37 m)
- Lock width: 26.25 ft (8.00 m)

Geography
- Start point: River Exe; 50.6633°N 3.4668°W
- End point: Exeter Quay; 50.7185°N 3.5317°W

The Exeter Ship Canal, also known as the Exeter Canal, is a canal leading from (and beside) the River Exe to Exeter Quay in the city of Exeter, Devon, England. It was first constructed in the 1560s, predating the "canal mania" period, and is one of the oldest artificial waterways in the UK. As built, it contained the first pound locks to be built in Britain. The canal was extended southwards in 1677, and when the contractor employed to enlarge the canal in 1698 absconded with the money, men and women from the city volunteered to carry out the work. It was completed in 1701 and was a financial success.

The engineer James Green made a series of improvements to the canal in the 1820s, and extended it southwards to Turf, where a new access lock was built, enabling ships to enter the canal at all states of the tide. The extension opened in 1827. Commercial carrying on the canal came to an end in the 1970s, with the final cargo of timber being unloaded in December 1973. However, the sludge carrier Countess Wear continued to use the canal, transporting sewage sludge from Exeter Sewage Works and dumping it at sea, until changes in legislation resulted in the practice ceasing on 31 December 1998. As commercial traffic ceased, it was replaced by leisure traffic. The canal was used for filming some of the historical drama The Onedin Line in the 1970s.

Since the building of the M5 motorway bridge, headroom has been limited to 30 feet (9.1 m), restricting the use of the canal by tall-masted sailing ships. Leisure use is also restricted by the swing and lift bridges at Countess Wear, which causes congestion to the road network when they are opened, and the cost of opening them is high. As they are nearing the end of their operational life, there is a campaign for them to be replaced with bridges giving more headroom, to enable more boats to reach Exeter.

== History ==
At the start of Exeter's history, the River Exe was tidal and navigable up to the city walls enabling it to be a busy port. In the 1270s or 1280s, the Countess of Devon, Isabella de Fortibus, built a weir across the river to power her mills (this weir is remembered in the name of the nearby suburb Countess Wear). This had the effect of cutting off Exeter's port from the sea and damaging its salmon fisheries. In 1290, trade with Exeter's port was restored, only to be blocked by a new weir built in 1317 by Hugh de Courtenay, 9th Earl of Devon (Isabella's cousin), who also built a quay at Topsham. Because of the blockages on the river, boats were forced to unload at Topsham and the earls were able to exact large tolls to transport goods to Exeter. For the next 250 years the city petitioned the King to have the waterway reopened, to no avail, until 1550 when Edward VI finally granted permission. However, it was by then too late because the river channel had silted up.

In 1563, Exeter traders employed John Trew of Glamorgan to build a canal to bypass the weirs and rejoin the River Exe in the centre of the city where a quay would be built. Work began in February 1564, and was completed in Autumn 1566 or early 1567. The canal had three locks with vertical gates – the first pound locks to be built in Britain. They accommodated boats up to 16 tonnes. The original cut was 3 feet (0.91 m) deep and 16 feet (4.9 m) wide (0.9 m by 5 m). It ran for three and a quarter miles (5.2 km) from just below the Countess Wear to the centre of Exeter. This navigation was not very effective; it could not be entered at all states of the tide, and the double transfer of cargo over such a short distance made it uncompetitive with road transport.

The weir that maintains the water level in the quay is named "Trew's Weir" after the canal's builder. When built, it replaced St Leonard's Weir, and as well as maintaining the water level, it also provided a water source for a fulling mill, a cotton mill and a paper mill. The city council considered the weir as a site for a hydro-electric generating station in 1899, as their existing station needed to be replaced, due to the impending introduction of electric trams. However, this option was not pursued, and a new steam-powered station was built at Haven Banks, near the head of the canal basin.

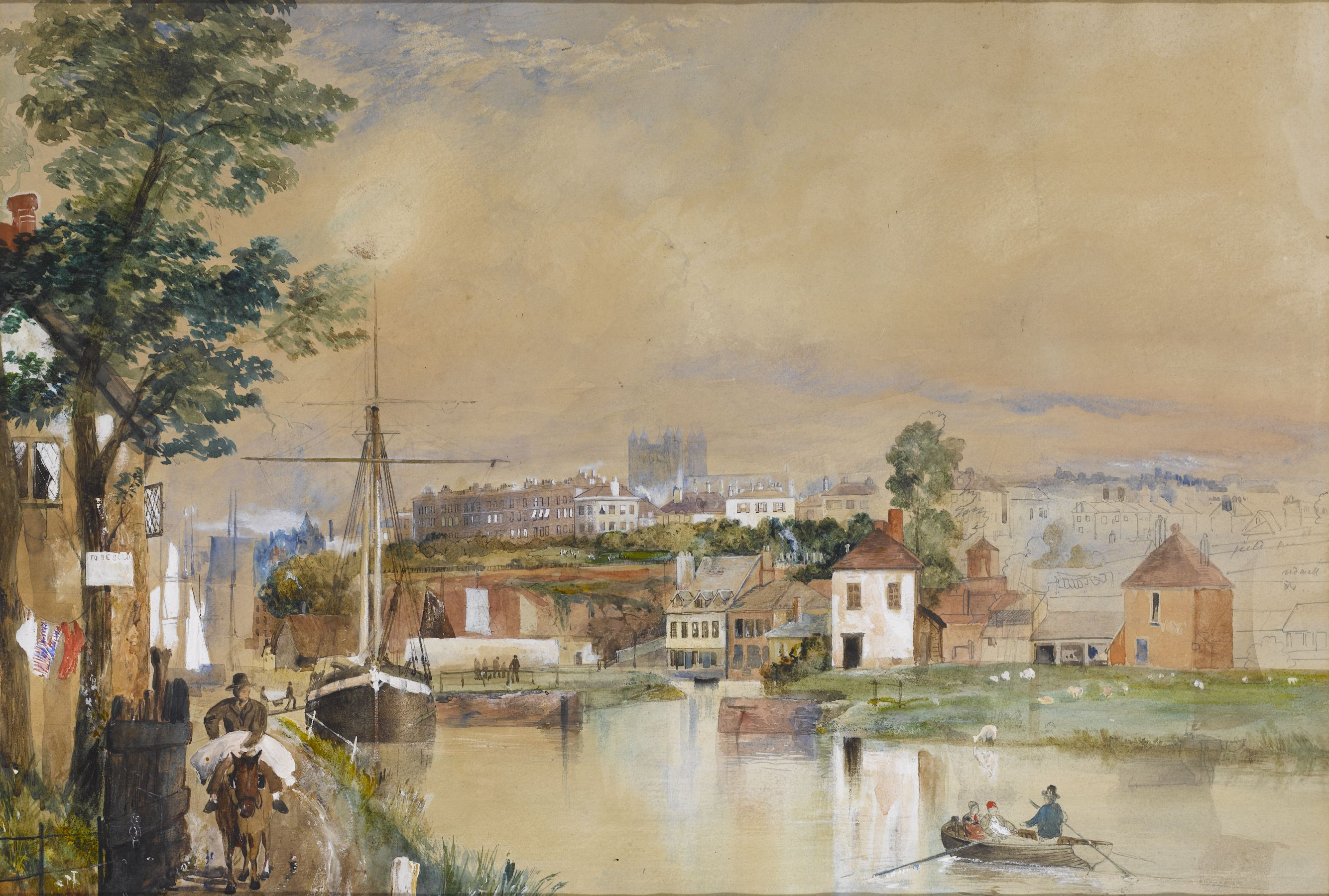
Watercolour painting of the canal basin by John Gendall painted between 1835 and 1840. Royal Albert Memorial Museum.

In 1677 the canal was extended, and the entrance was moved downstream towards Topsham, to avoid a difficult stretch of the river. The entrance was made larger, while a basin for transshipment of goods was provided nearby. The new entrance had a single pair of gates, was called Trenchard's Sluice, and could accommodate barges of 60 tons. As part of the upgrade a quay built of stone and a new weir were constructed at Exeter. Further enlargement was approved in 1698, when William Bayley was employed to create a canal with a draught of 14 feet (4.3 m) to enable seagoing craft to use it. Bayley absconded with much of the money in 1699, leaving the canal unusable. The Council decided to carry out the work themselves, and were assisted by a large number of volunteers, both men and women, from the town. In 1701 the canal was re-opened. They had created a canal which was 50 feet (15 m) wide and 10 feet (3.0 m) deep, which could be used by ships of up to 150 tons. The three locks were replaced by a single large lock, which could be used as a passing place. Floodgates were fitted where the canal re-entered the Exe at Exeter. The entrance to the canal still only had a single pair of gates, and large ships could only use it at spring tides.

These improvements led to the canal being successful. The number of boats using it was 310 per year between 1715 and 1724, but this had increased to 479 in 1750/51. In 1795/96 448 boats used the canal, consisting of 158 sea-going ships and 290 lighters. Receipts which had been £747 per year in the 1750s had risen to £2,335 by the 1790s and to £3,221 by the 1810s.

There were complaints by users of the canal, and the engineer James Green was asked to assess what could be done. In 1820 he was asked to implement his plans, dredging the canal, making it straighter, and repairing the lock. He completed the work in 1821, and in 1824 suggested that the canal should be extended to Turf, 2 miles (3.2 km) nearer to the sea, where there was room for a better entrance. Ships needing 12 feet (3.7 m) of water could reach that point at all states of the tide. Work began in 1825. While it was ongoing, the banks along the canal were raised, so that ships drawing 14 feet (4.3 m) could use it, and a new basin was built at Exeter, avoiding the need to make the river deeper where ships re-entered the river to reach the quay. The enlarged canal opened on 14 September 1827, with the basin following on 30 September 1830. The old entrance was closed, but a new side lock at Topsham was finished in 1832. Receipts improved, from £6,253 in 1830/31 to £8,550 in 1842/42, although there was some criticism that this had been achieved by raising the tolls and other charges.

There were many notable failures to connect Exeter and the South West to the national canal and rail networks: The Grand Western Canal linking Exeter to Bristol (1796) was never completed; the Bristol & Exeter Railway link to the canal basin was postponed in 1832 and 1844; the South Devon Railway ran services to the canal from 1867, but by this time the canal was too small to attract the sizeable ocean-going vessels and the canal was taken over by its creditors for sixteen years. Use of the canal declined with the end of the wool trade in the early 19th century and later with the rise of the railways.

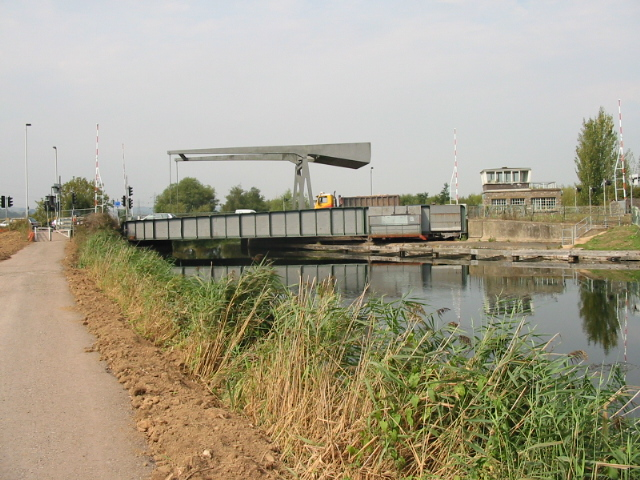
Countess Wear Canal Swing and Bascule Bridges over the Exeter Canal

=== 20th century ===
In 1939 the canal was still carrying some 63,000 tons of material annually, and after the war it was still seen as a useful means of transporting goods to and from its basin at Haven Banks, opposite Exeter Quay. Planning for the city after The Blitz recommended that Turf Lock, the canal's junction with the estuary be deepened and enlarged to allow ships of 600 tons to pass.

In May 1944 the Countess Wear Road bridge (present day A379) was used in rehearsals for the D-Day attack on the 'Canal de Caen' (Pegasus Bridge) and the River Orne (Horsa Bridge), by the Second Battalion Oxfordshire and Buckinghamshire Light Infantry. A plaque acknowledging this is sited on the south side of the bridges on the east bank.

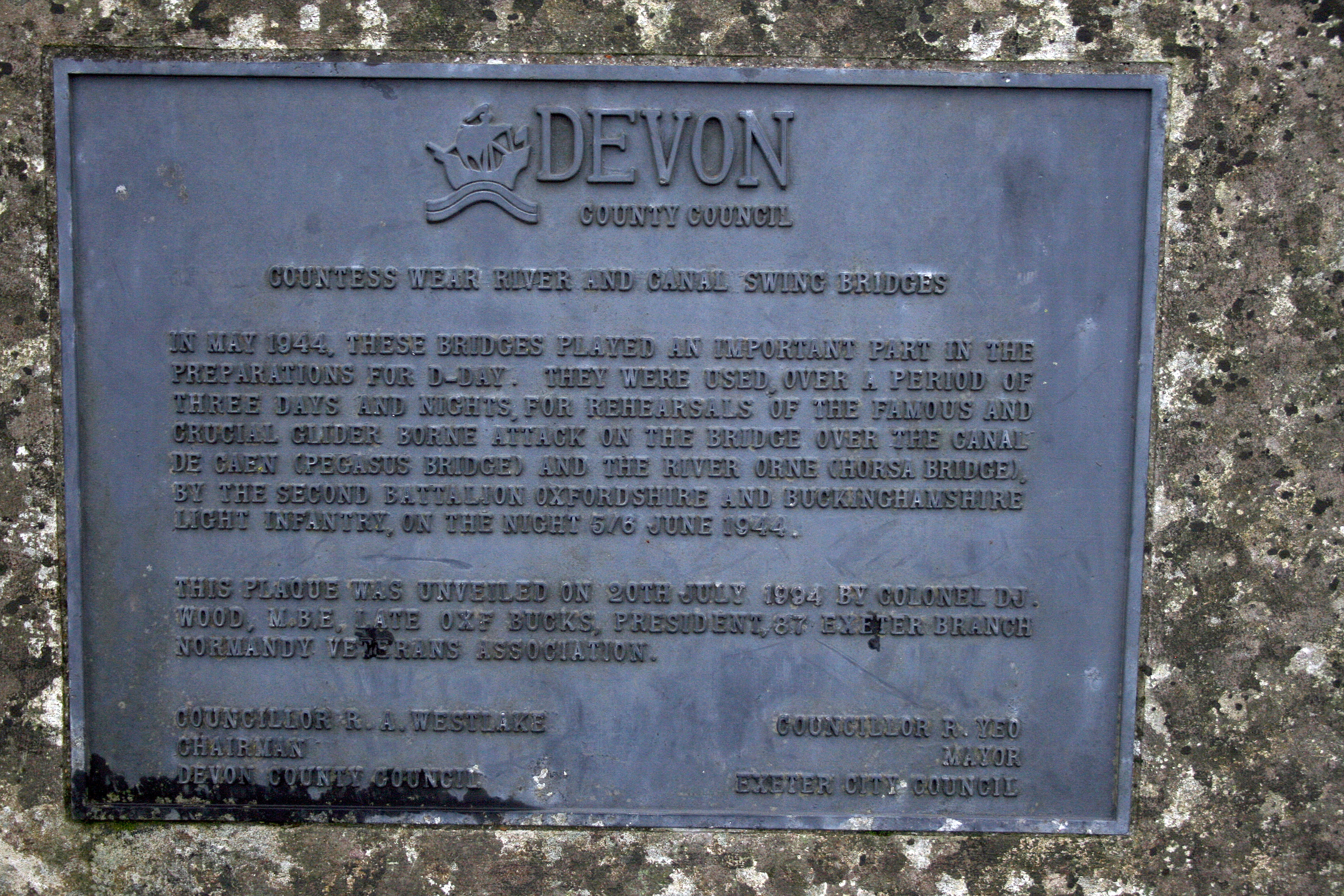
Image of plaque sited near the Exeter Canal Bridge acknowledging use of bridge in D-Day preparation rehearsals

One of the last regular commercial uses of the canal was the tanker Esso Jersey, which served the Esso oil terminal. The ship was known as the Kieler from 1977, and was scrapped in 1984. It was the largest ship to use the canal, and delivered a final load of 244 tons of petrol in July 1971. Commercial traffic ceased after a coaster unloaded a cargo of timber in December 1973. However, the ship Countess Wear continued to use the canal. It had been built in 1963 as a sludge carrier, and was used to take sewage sludge from the Exeter sewage works out to sea, where it was dumped. It was originally named SW2, but became the Countess Wear in 1974. It was operated by the city council, who owned the treatment works, and had to be modified slightly in 1975, as it would not fit under the newly constructed M5 motorway bridge. Ownership of the treatment works and the vessel passed to South West Water when the water industry was privatised in 1989, and dumping of sludge at sea ceased on 31 December 1998. The ship made a ceremonial visit to the canal in January 1999, after which it was sold.

The fall of commercial traffic in the 1960s coincided with the rise of leisure use of the canal. In the 1970s, the basin provided the backdrop for the filming of quayside activity in the historical drama The Onedin Line, even though the series was supposed to be set in Liverpool. In 2002 the future of the canal looked brighter when the city basin was included in a £24 million redevelopment scheme by Exeter Quay Developments, a consortium led by the construction company McAlpine. The quay area retains a mix of Georgian and Victorian buildings, repurposed for modern use, including the custom house which dates from 1681. The basin has seen a lot of redevelopment, including residential buildings in a mock warehouse style, with the older buildings finding new uses as antique shops, cafes, restaurants and studios. The canal basin itself is popular for a range of water sports, including canoeing, rowing and kayaking.

== Administration ==
The canal is owned by Exeter City Council. In 2017, they announced that it runs at a deficit, losing around £110,000 per year. They began negotiations with the Canal and River Trust in September 2016, with a view to transferring responsibility, but the talks were ended in December, with the council unhappy about the cost and likely outcomes of the action. They have since been looking at ways to increase the volume of boat traffic using the canal, but the major obstacles to this are the lifting bridge and swing bridge at Countess Wear, which carry separate carriageways of the A38 road over the canal. Opening the bridges is only carried out infrequently, because of the disruption it causes to traffic on the A38, and each opening costs around £800 in administrative and staffing costs. The council and a support group, the Friends of Exeter Ship Canal, are looking at ways this could be overcome.

The Countess Wear swing bridge dates from 1936, while the lifting bridge was added in 1972, when the A38 was the main route to the West Country, prior to the building of the M5 motorway viaduct in 1977. Options being considered are to replace the two bridges with a single swing bridge or lift bridge, building a new bridge at a higher level to give much more clearance, and the construction of a drop lock, to lower the level of the waterway beneath the bridges. Both bridges were nearing the end of their operational life in 2019, and the Friends group have been campaigning for the new bridges to be built with increased headroom. There is a possibility that this could be funded by the government's Major Road Network scheme. Development plans were given a boost in 2021, when Exeter Ship Canal and Basin became the United Kingdom's fourth Heritage Harbour, an award given by the Maritime Heritage Trust and National Historic Ships UK. Increasing the air draft of the bridges to 13 feet (4.0 m) would enable many more coastal boats to use the harbour, including those catching fish and shellfish.

== Route ==
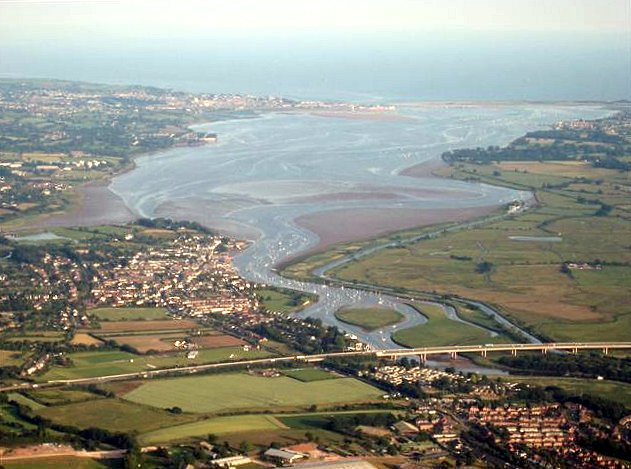
The lower part of the canal, from the line of the M5 motorway to its mouth at Turf Lock

A small section of the river below Cricklepit Bridge in Exeter is navigable. The bridge is a suspension bridge, designed by Dave Hubbard, and opened on 29 June 1988. Exeter Quay is located on the north bank of the river, and is fed by the mill stream from Cricklepit Mill, which dates from the 17th or 18th centuries. On its left bank is a complex of grade I listed buildings, consisting of a custom house, a wharfinger's house and a warehouse. The custom house dates from 1680/81 and was built by Richard Allen. The wharfinger's house is attached and was extended in 1711. The warehouse is also attached, and is nearest to the water. The Renaissance-inspired facade and impressive plasterwork of the custom house are particularly notable, and the building is the earliest purpose-built custom house in England. A small bridge crosses the quay below the custom house, below which is the grade II* listed fish market, an open sided building with cast iron columns supporting a slate roof. Some of the original cast iron beams are marked "A and W C Bodley, Iron Founders Exeter 1838". There is a jetty in the river next to the fish market.

Butts Ferry crosses the river below the fish market. There has been a ferry at this location since at least 1641. The present cable ferry dates from 2005, and is pulled across the river by its operator. A little further downstream, the entrance to the canal is on the right bank, with Trew's weir straight ahead preventing further navigation on the river. Kings Arms flood lock protects the entrance to the canal from high water levels and is followed by a pedestrian swing bridge. A second swing bridge, immediately to the west, crosses the entrance to the basin, now used as a marina for leisure boats. On the east bank of the basin is a mid-19th century warehouse, which is now used by the Exeter Maritime Museum. There is a towpath on both sides of the canal, with that on the left bank forming part of route 2 of the National Cycle Network. The canal is to the west of the river, and the railway, used by the Riviera Line and the Exeter to Plymouth Line, follows the canal a little further to the west.

The western towpath forms part of the Exe Valley Way, a 45 miles (72 km) long-distance footpath that follows the River Exe from its source to the sea. Continuing downstream, the canal is crossed by Salmonpool Bridge, a swing footbridge. Nearby is Marsh Barton railway station, which was formally opened on 3 July 2023, with a timetabled train service starting on the following day. Double Locks comes next, although it is actually a huge single lock with the gates far apart, and the section between the gates is wide enough to allow two ships to pass one another. The A379 Bridge Road crosses the river by a fixed bridge, and the canal by two movable bridges. The bridge over the river dates from 1770 and has six arches. It was widened on the southern side in 1935–38. Its construction was authorised by the Exeter Roads Act 1769 (9 Geo. 3. c. 93).

Below the bridges, the canal loops around Exeter sewage works. At its southern end, the former sludge lagoons have become the Old Sludge Beds Nature Reserve. The sludge lagoons were used until 1969, when a new treatment works was commissioned, and they became redundant. They were subsequently cleared and are now managed by the Devon Wildlife Trust. There are extensive reed beds which provide habitat for wetland birds, and the reserve is part of the Exe Estuary Site of Special Scientific Interest (SSSI). At the southern edge of the old sludge beds is a flyover carrying the M5 motorway. Air draft for boats using the canal is restricted to 33 feet (10 m), which prevents some sailing vessels from reaching Exeter. Topsham Lock gave access to the river from 1832, but has been disused since the 1970s, when the gates required replacement, and instead it was blocked off by steel sheets. By 2017, these were becoming buckled and rusted and Exeter Council were looking at three options to resolve the issues. These were to replace the steel sheeting, to refurbish the lock, or to permanently decommission it.

Below the lock, the Topsham Ferry swing bridge crosses the canal, providing access to a passenger ferry to Topsham. This also carries cycles, and is open six days a week during the summer months, and at weekends during the winter. To the west of the canal is Exeminster Marshes Nature Reserve, an SSSI run by the Royal Society for the Protection of Birds. After passing through some narrows, the canal widens out to form the entry basin to the canal. Between the canal and the river is the Turf Hotel, built as an inn by the engineer James Green in 1825. He was employed as the surveyor of Bridges and Buildings for Devon between 1818 and 1841. Green was also responsible for the construction of Turf Lock in 1825, which provides access to the estuary. The work was difficult, with Thomas Telford stating that he had "never seen so troublesome a foundation" although he was complimentary of the methods Green adopted to overcome the difficulties. A short channel heads southwards to the estuary. Berry Brook joins on the right bank, and there is a landing stage for a passenger ferry by the left bank at the confluence.

== See also ==
- Canals of Great Britain
- History of the British canal system

== Bibliography ==
- Blair, John (2007). Waterways and Canal-Building in Medieval England. Oxford University Press. ISBN 978-0-19-921715-1.
- Cumberlidge, Jane (April 2012). "Explore the Exeter Ship Canal". Waterways World. Waterways World. ISSN 0309-1422.
- Denny, Andrew (May 2017). "Exploring the Exeter Ship Canal". Waterways World. Waterways World. ISSN 0309-1422.
- Hadfield, Charles (1967). The Canals of South West England. David and Charles. ISBN 978-0-7153-4176-6.
- Jackman, W. T. (1916). The Development of Transportation in Modern England. Cambridge University Press. ISBN 978-0-7146-1326-0.
- Nicholson (2006). Nicholson Guides Vol 7: River Thames & the Southern Waterways. Harper Collins. ISBN 978-0-00-721115-9.
