= James Walker (Exeter MP) =

English politician, MP for Exeter in the 17th century

Member of the House of Commons

Personal details
- Born: 1635 Exeter, Devon, England
- Died: 16 January 1692 (aged 56–57)
- Resting place: St Mary Arches Church, Exeter
- Party: Tory
- Spouse: Dorothy Southcote (m. 1676; died 1677)
- Relations: Thomas Walker (brother)
- Children: 1

James Walker (c. 1635–1692), of Exeter, Devon was an English politician who sat in the House of Commons in the late 17th century. He was a local landowner and active in municipal affairs in Exeter.

James Walker was born circa 1635, the fourth son of Robert Walker and younger brother of Thomas Walker. He married Dorothy Southcote on 15 August 1676, though she died a year later on 27 August 1677. They had one child together, a daughter.

Walker served as a captain in the Barbados Dragoons, an England-based regiment, from 1672 to 1674. A decade later, he became mayor of Exeter, then served as a Member of the House of Commons under King James II of England. After leaving the position, he served as colonel in Jamaica (1686-1690), as well as governor of Port Royal (1686-1690).

Walker died on 16 January 1692. He is buried at St Mary Arches Church, Exeter.
