= Thomas Floud =

Mayor of Exeter (1801-1802) and (1818-1819)

Thomas Solomon Floud
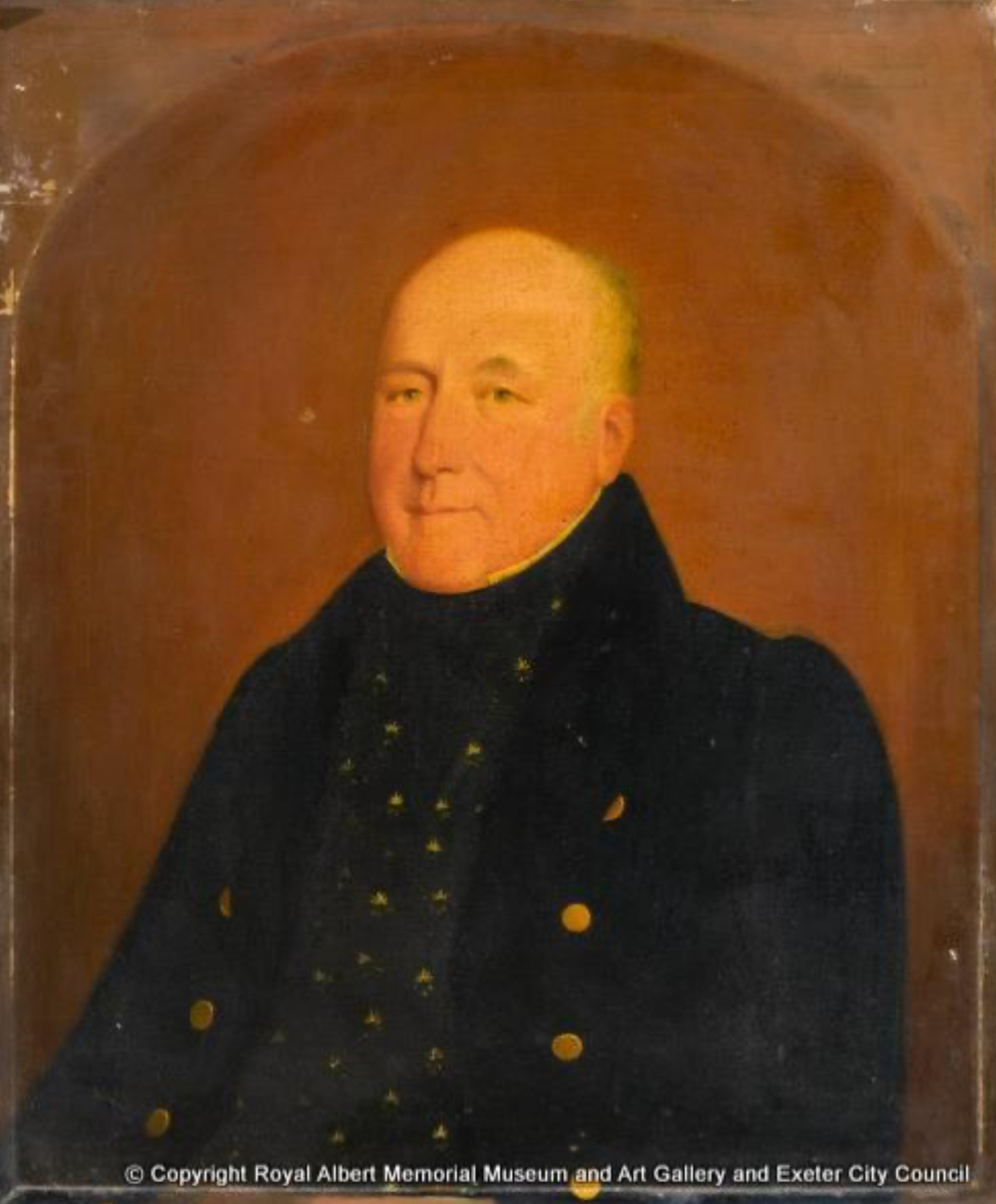
- Painting of a gentleman (c. 1825–1835) possibly depicting Thomas Floud
- Born: c. 1767; Exeter, Devon, England
- Died: 25 April 1842; Exeter, Devon, England
- Burial place: St David's Church, Exeter
- Occupation: Mayor of Exeter
- Years active: 1801–1802, 1818–1819
- Title: Mayor
- Term: 1801–1802, 1818–1819
- Relatives: Mary Floud; wife of Samuel Mitchell (governor)

Thomas Solomon Floud (c. 1767 – 25 April 1842) was the mayor of the town of Exeter, England, from 1801 to 1802, and again in 1818 to 1819.

== Early life ==
Thomas Solomon Floud was born around 1767 to Daniel Floud and Elizabeth Davey in Exeter. His younger sister Mary Floud, later went on to marry Samuel Mitchell, a former governor of Grenada.

== Mayorships ==
In 1801, Thomas Floud became Mayor of Exeter following the tenure of his predecessor Richard Jenkin. On the 21st January 1801 he gave Lord Nelson the honour of being a freeman of Exeter (‘Freedom of the city’) in the town Guidhall. Nelson gifted his sword to the city, where it remains. As mayor he also enforced cleanliness and suppressed the practice of leaving horse and carts out on the streets. His first tenure ended in 1802. In his second tenure he opened the newly constructed prison at Northernhay Street. His second tenure ended in 1819.

He died on 25 April 1842 in Exeter and is buried at St David’s Church cemetery in Exeter.
