= Thomas Walker (Exeter MP) =

17th-century English landowner and politician

Member of the House of Commons

Personal details
- Born: c. 1632
- Died: 24 November 1682 (approx. 50 years old)
- Resting place: St Mary Arches Church, Exeter
- Spouse(s): Jane Mary Hall (m. 1664; died 1707)
- Relations: James Walker (brother)
- Children: 2

Thomas Walker (c. 1632–1682), of Exeter, Devon was an English landowner and politician who sat in the House of Commons in the 17th century. He was the brother of James Walker, also an MP for Exeter.

Walker was born circa 1632, the eldest son of Robert Walker, born to his second wife. He first married Joan, with whom he had no children, then married Mary Hall on 27 October 1664. The couple had two children before Mary died 3 December 1707, though neither outlived their father.

Walker was knighted on 1 June 1681. He died the following year on 24 November and is buried at St Mary Arches Church, Exeter.
