= Duport =

Duport is a French surname. Notable people with the surname include:

- Adrien Duport (1759–1798), French politician
- Alphred Duport (fl. 13th-century), English politician; mayor of Exeter, Devon, eight times
- Auguste Duport (1777–1843), French playwright
- James Duport (1606–1679), English classical scholar
- Jean-Louis Duport (1749–1819), French cellist, brother of Jean-Pierre
- Jean-Pierre Duport (1741–1818), French cellist, brother of Jean-Louis
- John Duport (died 1617), English scholar and translator
- Louis Duport (1781/83–1853), French ballet dancer
- Paul Duport (1798–1866), French dramatist and librettist
- Romain Duport (born 1986), French basketball player
- Vincent Duport (born 1987), French rugby league footballer
