= Robert Hooker =

Robert Hooker may refer to:

- Robert Hooker (soccer) (born 1967), soccer player
- Robert Hooker (MP) (by 1466–1537), English MP and mayor
