= Christopher Lethbridge =

Christopher Lethbridge may refer to:

- Christopher Lethbridge (Australian politician) (1883 –1981), member of the New South Wales Legislative Assembly
- Christopher Lethbridge (mayor) (died 1670), mayor of Exeter in 1660
- Christopher Lethbridge (cricketer) (1961–2025), English cricketer
