= Thomas Eston =

English politician

Thomas Eston (fl. 1413), of Exeter, Devon, was an English politician.

He was a member (MP) of the parliament of England for Exeter in February 1413. Eston was Mayor of Exeter in 1414–15, 1419–20, 1422–3, and 1426–7.
