= Sir James Smith's School =

Sir James Smith's Community School

Location
- Dark Lane; Camelford, Cornwall, PL32 9UJ; England
- Coordinates: 50°37′18″N 4°41′04″W

Information
- Type: Comprehensive; Academy
- Motto: Aspiration. Ambition. Achievement
- Established: 1679
- Founder: Sir James Smyth
- Trust: Westcountry Schools Trust
- Department for Education URN: 146408 Tables
- Ofsted: Reports
- Headteacher: Marc Cooper
- Staff: 60
- Gender: Coeducational
- Age: 11 to 16
- Enrolment: 417 (April 2016)
- Houses: Chydeme, Tredeme, Poldeme & Landeme
- Colours: Black and Red
- Website: http://www.sirjamessmiths.cornwall.sch.uk

Sir James Smith's School is a coeducational secondary school located in the town of Camelford, North Cornwall, England. The headteacher is Marc Cooper.

== History ==
The school was founded as a grammar school in 1679 by Sir James Smith the local member of parliament, at a property overlooking the town. In 1879 a new school was built at a central town location on what was named College Road. The school in 1962 became the first comprehensive school in Cornwall when it moved further out to a purpose built site on Dark Lane. The new school was designed by the county architect, F. K. Hicklin, and Kenneth Sprayson continued to be headmaster. (The former school building at College Road, built in 1879 and extended twice before being abandoned was subsequently used as offices for the Camelford rural district council.)

Previously a foundation school administered by Cornwall Council, in October 2018 Sir James Smith's School converted to academy status. The school is now a member of the Westcountry Schools Trust.

== Geography ==
The catchment area for Sir James Smith's is largely rural and covers an extensive and sparsely populated district of north Cornwall, stretching along the coast from Crackington Haven to Boscastle, Tintagel, and Port Isaac. Inland Delabole, St Teath and St Breward and the isolated hamlets and farmsteads of Bodmin Moor are included. This area is one of the most economically deprived in Europe. Available employment is frequently part-time and/or seasonal and the average wage is the lowest in the UK; whereas property and living costs are among the highest.

== 21st century ==
The school has 602 pupils aged 11–16 (as of 2023).

The last decade has seen an extension to the adult education building; the Salon United for careers in hair and beauty therapy (2007); the West End music and drama suite (2004); a new reception and office suite (2003); a new Mathematics block (2001) and The Princess of Wales Design Centre (Arts and Technology) (1992). The school however closed the hair salon extension, which has subsequently become the offices for Camelford police, a part of Devon and Cornwall Police.

In 2005 Sir James Smith's School became the first specialist humanities college in Cornwall.

In October 2007 it was announced that the school's Sixth Form block would be closing with immediate effect. No new students were to be admitted in the following September. Students continuing their education now travel to other Sixth Form centres at Bude, Bodmin or Truro College.

== Deme system ==
In 2004 the deme system was introduced: Deme being a Latin term for a house or group. The first elements of the names are derived from common place-name elements in Cornish: chy (house), tre (farmstead), pol (pool), and lan (originally an enclosure, but in placenames usually combined with the name of a saint to refer to a church). The demes are equivalent to the house system followed by many neighbouring schools. (A division into Drake House (green) and Wallis House (red) was in existence at one time in the grammar school; then Bottreaux, Carew, Grenville and Molesworth houses in the comprehensive school.) An in-school competition followed to name them: those selected were all from the Cornish language, with deme added to the end.

- Chydeme - blue
- Tredeme - orange
- Poldeme - purple
- Landeme - yellow

Although the school had a 'vertical' tutoring system for a number of years, where forms consisted of a single deme and students from years 7 - 11), it has since reverted to the more traditional year group form system.

== Magazine ==
The pupils produced a school magazine in the 1950s and 1960s called The Camel: the issues for 1957-1962 are numbered Vol. I, no. VI - XI and 1964 is not numbered.

== Notable former pupils and staff ==
- Trevor Colman — UKIP MEP for South West England, 2008-2014
- Derek Pooley — chief executive, United Kingdom Atomic Energy Authority, 1994-97
- Jenny Rowe — civil servant and chief executive of the new Supreme Court of the United Kingdom
- Tom Jago — liquor executive and marketeer
- Sheila Oates Williams — mathematician in Australia
- Carole Vincent (1939-2019) — painter, sculptor and teacher; taught at the school
