= Exeter Golf and Country Club =

Golf club in England

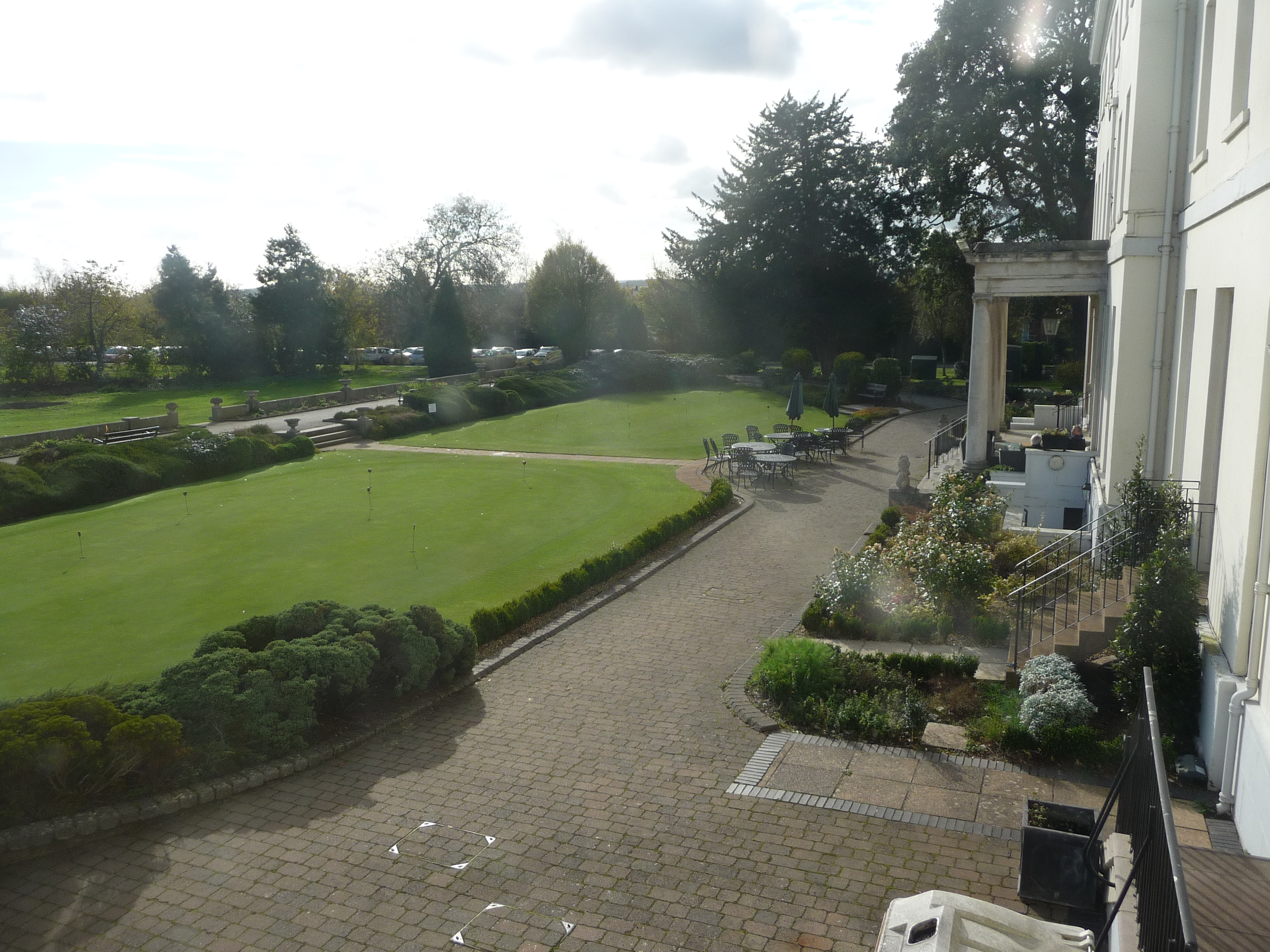
- Golf Club and House

- Exeter Golf and Country Club
- 50.7009848°N 3.4857244°W

Club information
- Location: Exeter, England
- Established: April 1895, 131 years ago
- Type: private
- Website: https://www.exetergcc.co.uk

Exeter Golf and Country Club offers golf, rackets, gym and swimming memberships, as well as an onsite restaurant and spa facilities. It can also be hired as a wedding or corporate events venue.

== History ==
Exeter Golf and Country Club was founded in April 1895 on the outskirts of Exeter city in Pennsylvania, with the first annual meeting held on 4 October. During their first meeting, it was announced that 40 people had been elected as members of the club, in addition to its founding members, comprising several local men who had an interest in the sport. Several ladies also expressed an interest to apply for admission, although none had been admitted by the time of the meeting and it was deemed necessary to prepare a women's only course before considering their admission. The club obtained ground known as Stoke Wood Farm with favourable letting arrangements. On their first anniversary in April 1896, a club house was formally opened and on the same day, the club's first match was played with Seaton, which Exeter won by 17 points.

During its third annual meeting held in October 1897, membership numbers were reported to be 96, while just one match had been played during the year, which the club won. The accounts showed a balance of over £110. The committee authorised expenditure of £40 to finance a mowing machine and a horse.

In 1919, Captain George Henry James Duckworth-King sold the estate; in 1927, the Wear Park estate, which was once owned by Henry III, was purchased to accommodate a new course. In October 1928, the club formally transferred from Pennsylvania to their new course at Countess Wear, around a year after the Wear House grounds were acquired by the club. The accompanying mansion was converted into a club house and the grounds adapted to provide an 18-hole course, as well as tennis recreations. The membership numbers deemed it necessary to move to a new ground, while it was expected the transfer would likely increase membership interest over the following months.

By 1941, membership had reached 457 people, of which 312 were men, while in excess of 1,000 games had been played.

Its longest-serving director to date is businessman Alan Eveleigh, who ran the club from 4 November 1992 to 29 October 2005.

== Features ==
The modern golf course includes Wear Park Restaurant and Wear Park Spa.
