= John Cutler alias Carwithan =

English politician

John Cutler alias Carwithan (died 1467?) of Exeter, Devon, was an English politician.

He was a member of the Parliament of England (MP) for Exeter in May 1421, 1425, 1429, 1433 and 1461. He was mayor of Exeter in 1436–7, 1442–3 and 1448–9.
