= Mark Ormerod (civil servant) =

British civil servant

Mark Ormerod CB

Chief Executive of the Supreme Court of the United Kingdom
- In office September 2015 – September 2020
- Appointed by: The Lord Neuberger of Abbotsbury
- President: The Lord Neuberger of Abbotsbury; The Baroness Hale of Richmond
- Preceded by: Jenny Rowe
- Succeeded by: Vicky Fox

Personal details
- Born: 3 August 1957 (age 69)
- Education: University of Leeds; University of Tours
- Occupation: Civil servant

Mark Edward Ormerod CB (born 3 August 1957) is a retired British civil servant and chief executive of the Supreme Court of the United Kingdom and the Judicial Committee of the Privy Council from 2015 to 2020.

He was educated at Oundle School, the University of Leeds and the University of Tours.

Ormerod was previously the Chief Executive of the Law Commission. He also held posts as Chief Executive of the Probation Associations and was Director of Access to Justice Policy at the Ministry of Justice.
