= James Smyth (English MP) =

English politician

Sir James Smyth (c. 1621 – 18 November 1681) was an English politician who sat in the House of Commons from 1661 to 1681.

He was lieutenant-colonel and captain of the Tangier Regiment from its raising in 1661 until 1665, when he became lieutenant-colonel of the Coldstream Guards.

The Smyths were a prominent family in Exeter and he married a Cornish heiress. He was Member of Parliament for Exeter from 1661 until 1679, and Camelford from 1679 until his death in 1681.

He is regarded as the founder of Sir James Smith's School, Camelford (established 1679, modified 1962).

Parliament of England
Preceded by John Maynard; Thomas Bampfield	Member of Parliament for Exeter; 1661–1679; With: Robert Walker 1661–1673; Thomas Walker 1673–1679	Succeeded by William Glyde; Malachi Pyne
Preceded by Hon. Thomas Coventry; Sir William Godolphin	Member of Parliament for Camelford; 1679–1681; With: William Harbord 1679; Robert Russell 1679–1681	Succeeded by Humphrey Langford; Nicholas Courtney
