= Jenny Rowe =

British civil servant

Jenny Rowe CB

Chief Executive of the Supreme Court of the United Kingdom
- In office October 2009 – October 2015
- Appointed by: Jack Straw, Lord Chancellor
- President: Lord Phillips of Worth Matravers; Lord Neuberger of Abbotsbury
- Preceded by: Position created
- Succeeded by: Mark Ormerod

Personal details
- Born: 2 October 1955 (age 71)
- Spouse: John Ellis (m. 1993)
- Education: King's College London; Birkbeck College
- Occupation: Civil servant

Jennifer Rowe (born 2 October 1955) is a retired British civil servant and former chief executive of the Supreme Court of the United Kingdom and the Judicial Committee of the Privy Council.

== Early life and education ==
Jenny Rowe was born on 2 October 1955, and educated at Sir James Smith's School, Camelford. She graduated from King's College London in 1977 with a BA (Hons) degree in History, and studied at the College of Law, Lancaster Gate, and Birkbeck College, where she gained an MSc degree in Policy Administration in 1984.

== Civil service ==
Rowe joined the civil service shortly after graduating from Birkbeck, and held a number of posts in the Lord Chancellor's Department. From 1990 to 1993, Rowe was Principal Private Secretary to the Lord Chancellor, and from 1993 to 1995, was Principal Establishment and Finance Officer at the Serious Fraud Office. She returned to the Lord Chancellor's Department in 1995 as Head of Criminal Policy, and was re-appointed Principal Private Secretary to the Lord Chancellor in 1997. In 1999, she became Director of Corporate Services, and in 2002, Director of Finance and Corporate Affairs. She served as Secretary to the Butterfield Review of Criminal Investigations and Prosecutions conducted by HM Customs and Excise in 2003. In 2004, she was appointed Director of Policy Administration at the Attorney General's Office. In January 2008, the Lord Chancellor, Jack Straw, announced Rowe's appointment as the first chief executive of the new Supreme Court of the United Kingdom, which began operation in October 2009. Rowe retired in October 2015 and was succeeded by Mark Ormerod as chief executive of the Supreme Court of the United Kingdom.

Rowe was appointed Companion of the Order of the Bath (CB) in the 2013 Birthday Honours.

== Personal life ==
Rowe married the late John Ellis in 1993.

Her interests include travelling, reading, theatre, opera, museums and galleries, gardening and watching cricket. She is a member of the Royal Over-Seas League, Middlesex County Cricket Club and Surrey County Cricket Club, and has been a Trustee of the Royal British Legion since 2005.
