= Thomas Shapter =

Gibraltarian epidemiologist (1809–1902)

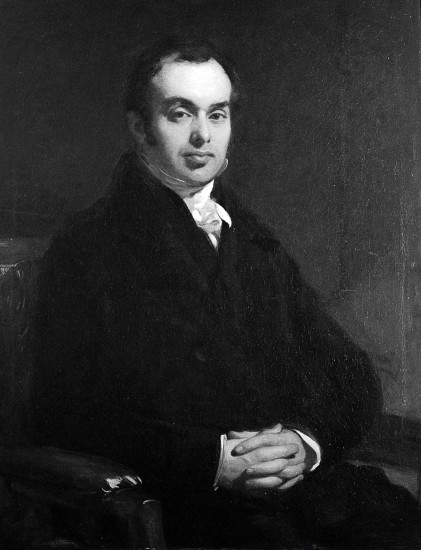
- Dr Thomas Shapter
- Born: 1809; Gibraltar
- Died: 1902 (aged 92–93)
- Citizenship: British
- Education: University of Edinburgh
- Scientific career
- Fields: epidemiology

Thomas Shapter (1809–1902) was born in Gibraltar, graduated from the University of Edinburgh, and arrived in Exeter in the year cholera arrived, 1832. Today, Shapter is best known for the account he wrote of this devastating cholera outbreak, entitled The History of the Cholera in Exeter in 1832. He also served one term as Mayor of Exeter.

== Career ==
Shapter developed a medical practice in Exeter and was a member of the governing body of the City, the Chamber, in 1835. As Newton puts it "his early admission into the restricted governing class of a cathedral city is a measure of his personality, as well as of his political and religious orthodoxy". Such ties were further cemented by his marriage in 1840 to the Reverend Samuel Blackhall's daughter. He was later to become Mayor (twice) and Sheriff of the City.

He was appointed physician in 1847 at the Devon and Exeter Hospital and also worked at the Magdalen Hospital, The Lying-in Charity and St Thomas' Hospital for Lunatics (1845).

He led an active public life and was elected Mayor of Exeter in 1848.

When cholera again posed a threat in 1867 he opposed plans to transfer the powers of the Improvement Commissioners to the Board of Health under the 1858 Health Act. He appears to have still believed in the efficacy of the measures and institutions established during the 1830s.

He retired from the staff of the Devon and Exeter Hospital in 1876 and later moved to London. Newton states that his departure from the city was under something of a cloud "His reputation seems to have suffered locally from the injudicious acceptance of a legacy from a mental patient under his care". In old age he went blind and died in 1902 aged 93. He is buried in a family grave on the eastern side of Highgate Cemetery.

Apart from his famous work on cholera he also published books a number of other books which included. Leprosy in the Middle Ages and Climate of the South of Devon. He was also a collector of art which he used to furnish his home at no. 1 Barnfield Crescent.

== Cholera ==
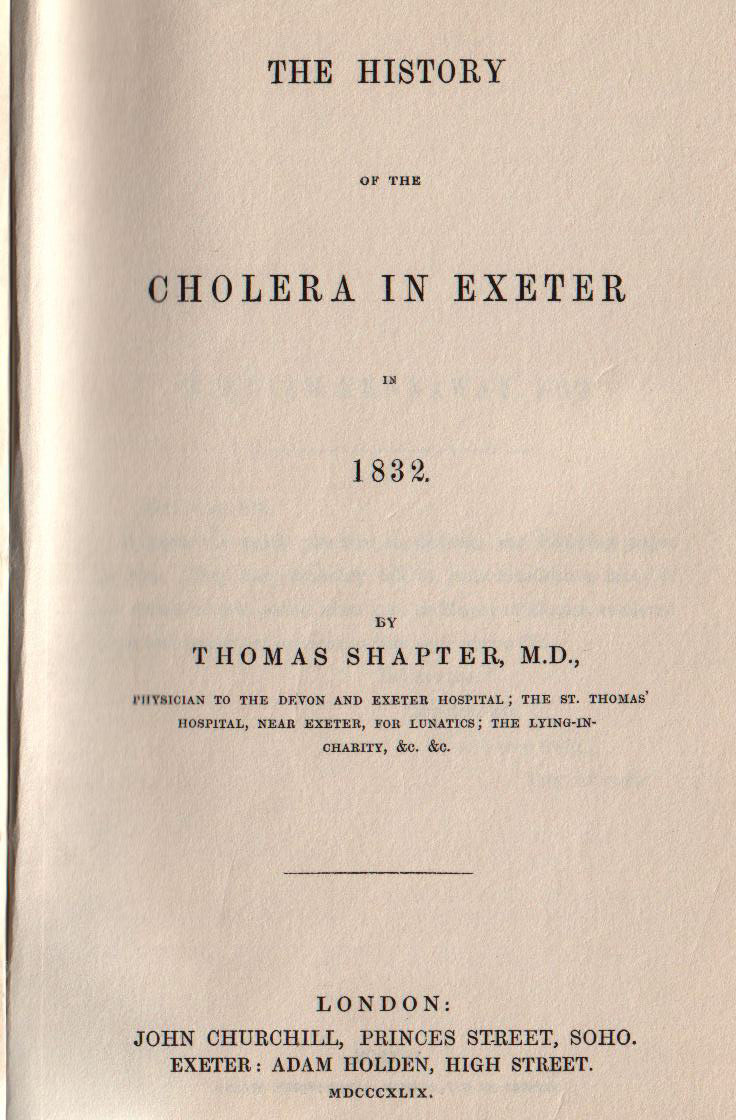
Title Page of the original edition

Shapter is best known for his interest in environment and disease through his work "History of the Cholera in Exeter in 1832" which was published in 1849. This account was described in the British Medical Journal of 8 April 1933 as "one of the best descriptions extant of an historical epidemic".

It is one of the longest and most thorough of the local cholera histories written and interest in it was probably enhanced by the fact that it was published in the middle of a later outbreak of the disease. The compilation of the book was far from easy as the official records had already been lost by the time Shapter began the book in the 1840s, and he was dependent upon any other sources he could locate plus the reminiscences of those who lived through the disease or were involved in its treatment or prevention.

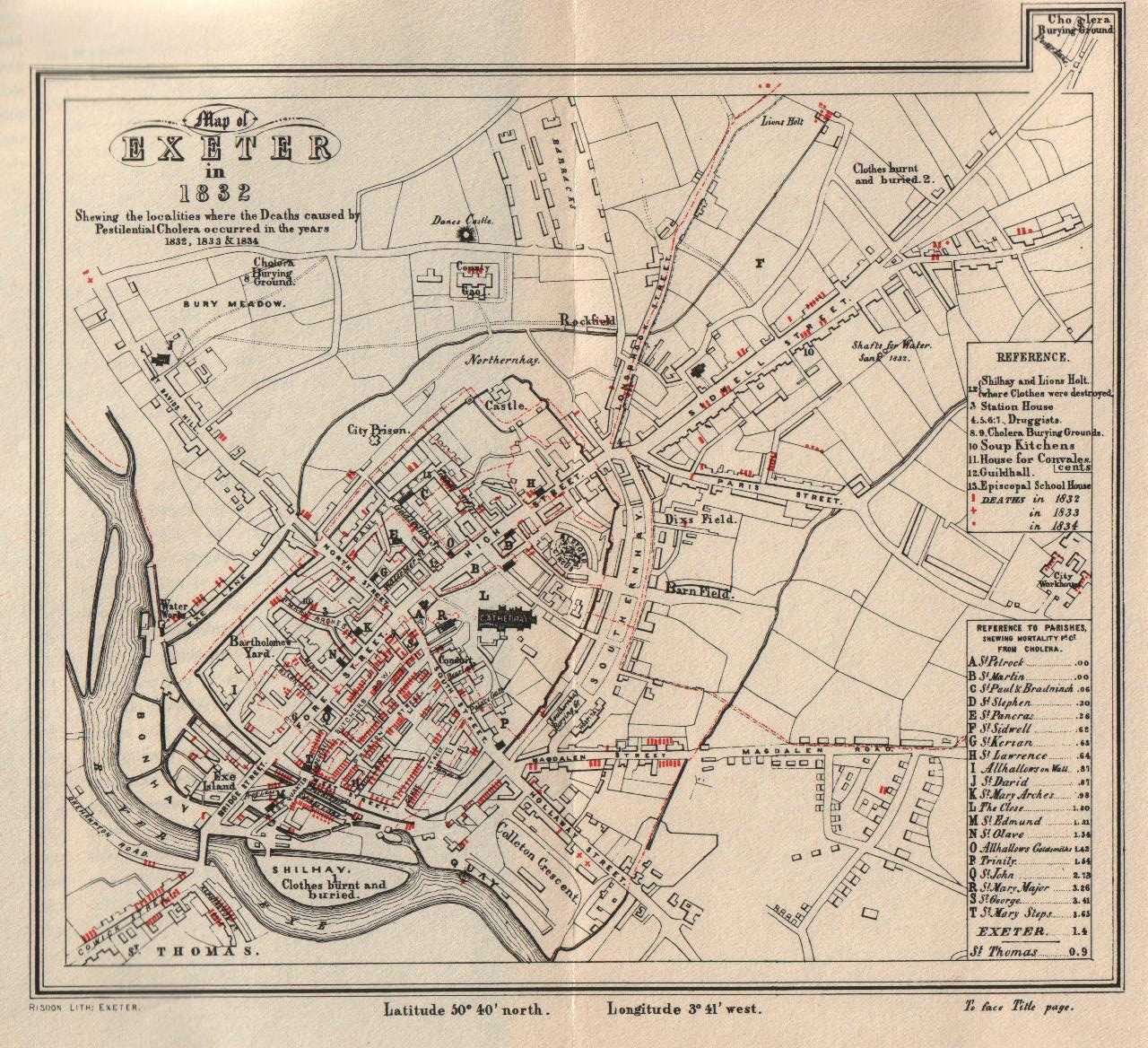
This map was the frontispiece to Shapters original 1849 publication of "History of the Cholera in Exeter in 1832" and was cited by John Snow in his 2nd edition of his publication on cholera in which he added a similar map known as the "Ghost Map"

The book describes the arrival of cholera in the city, the reactions of the citizens and authorities to the disease and the efforts of the Board of Health in coping with the outbreak. The book paints a vivid picture of the local conditions which helped to foster the spread of the disease in the city. It clearly describes the problems faced by nineteenth-century towns with their inadequate administrative arrangements, organisation and financial resources in trying to cope with the cholera outbreak. One of the fascinating features of the book are the engravings provided for it by the Exeter artist John Gendall. These were added quite late on in the publication process with Shapter commenting that he was pleased to include "these interesting sketches of old parts of Exeter".

== Influence ==
John Snow is well known for his study of the cholera outbreak in London and his use of a map to illustrate the locality of deaths to a public water source on Broad Street. The so-called "Ghost Map" is cited as a kind of watershed moment in the history of epidemiology and to some extent also in Information Design and GIS. The high profile of this work has led to research into the historicity of modern accounts and Thomas Shapter's influence on Snow:

Snow may have realised that a spot map would be a useful illustration for his report to the parish committee and for his own book. The first edition of on the mode of communication of cholera, published in 1849, contained no maps and only one table. By 1854 Snow had seen the excellent map in Shapter's work on the cholera in Exeter, which Shapter included as a frontispiece but hardly discussed in his text. Shapter's book, which Snow cited in the second edition of his own work, may have persuaded Snow of the value of a map as an illustration.

— Brody et al., The Lancet 356 (9223)

== Sources ==
- Graeme Barber (2004) Thomas Shapter: The History of the Cholera in Exeter 1832 Introduction and background
- Thomas Shapter (1849) The History of the Cholera in Exeter in 1832. London: John Churchill
- John Snow (1849 1st edn) On the mode of communication of cholera. London: John Churchill
- John Snow (1855 2nd edn) On the mode of communication of cholera. London: John Churchill
- Robert Newton (1974) The History of the Cholera in Exeter in 1832, by Thomas Shapter (facsimile reprint of original 1849 ed, with introduction by Robert Newton, Urban History Series, G. H. Martin, ed), SR Publishers
