= Richard Hewet =

16th-century English politician

Richard Hewet (by 1463 – 1519), of Exeter, Devon, was an English politician.

He was a member (MP) of the parliament of England for Exeter in 1512 and 1515. He was mayor of Exeter in 1506–7 and 1513–14.
