= Rowland Glave Saunders =

British veterinary surgeon (1873-1952)

Roland Glave Saunders CBE MRVCS, (12 March 1873 — 10 December 1952 (aged 79)) was a veterinary surgeon from Exeter, Devon, who was later elected as Sheriff of Exeter and then six-times Mayor of Exeter.

== Biography ==
=== Early life ===
Glave Saunders was born in Fore Street, Exeter, to the founder of successful local drapery business, Saunders and Mumford.

Having completed school in Exeter, he became a pupil of local veterinary surgeon, Mr James Heath.

=== Veterinary practice ===
He graduated from the Royal Veterinary College in London in 1895, and then spent 2.5 years teaching at the Colonial College in Suffolk.

Glave Saunders then relocated to Penzance, where he also served as a veterinary inspector for the Ministry of Agriculture.

In 1908, he married Gladys Martin of Penzance.

He worked in Penzance until 1926, when he retired on grounds of ill health.

=== Return to Exeter ===
He returned to his hometown of Exeter, and became quickly involved in local politics, firstly as a Liberal councillor for the Exwick ward.

In 1935, he was elected as Sheriff of Exeter, by which time he was already the acting-Chairman on the Public Assistance Committee, Chairman of the Maternity and Child Welfare Committee, and Deputy-Chairman of the City Mental Hospital Committee.

=== Mayoralty ===
Glave Saunders was elected as Mayor of Exeter in 1938, and due to the demands of the Second World War continued in that position, being re-elected five times, and serving six terms, being the first mayor to do so since William Hurst who last served in 1561.

In 1945, Glave Saunders was awarded the Commander of the Most Excellent Order of the British Empire (CBE) for his service.

=== Death ===
Glave Saunders died at his home in Exmouth on 10 December 1952, aged 79.
