= St Mary Arches Church, Exeter =

Church of Saint Mary Arches
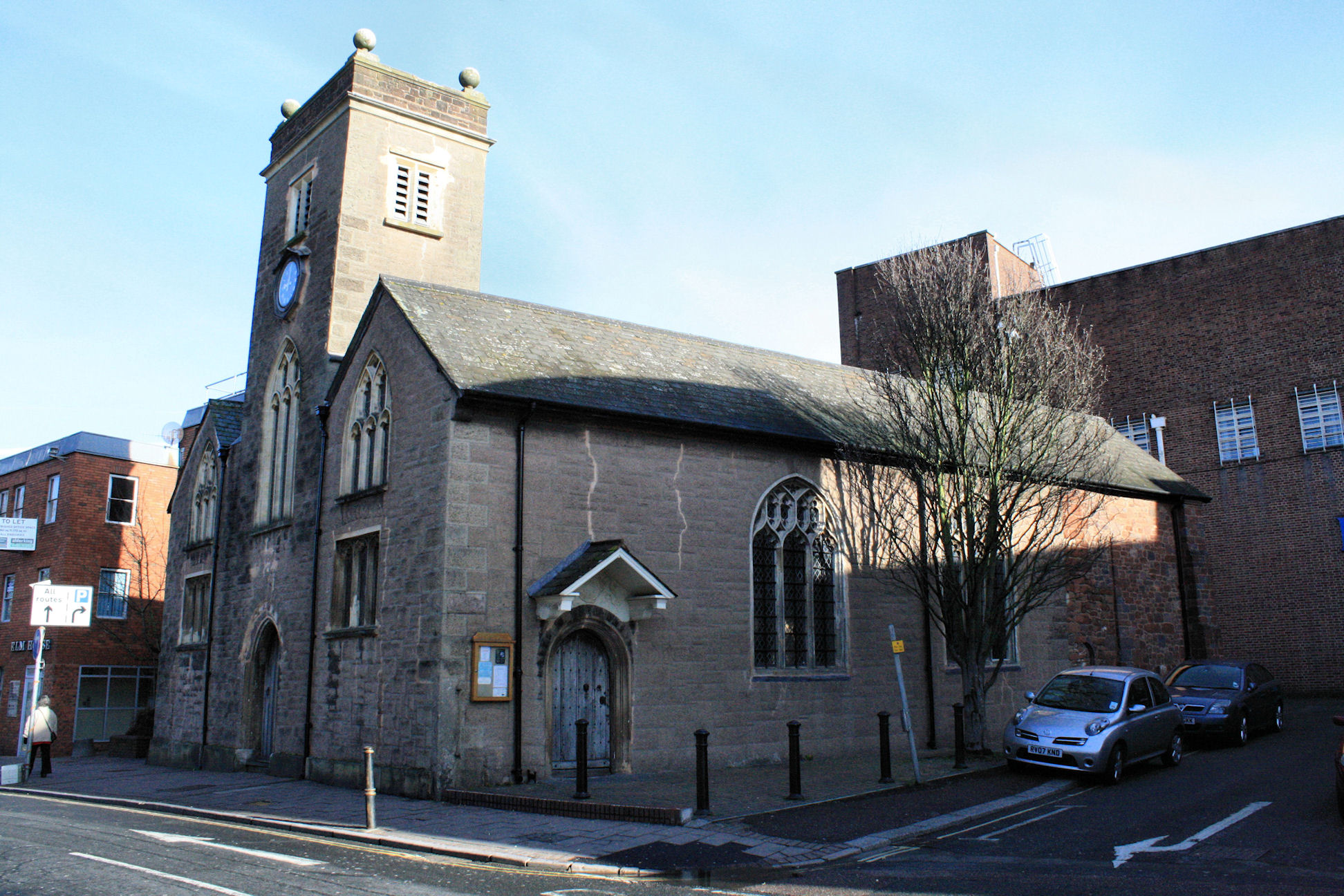
- Saint Mary Arches Church

- Location within Devon
- 50°43′20.3″N 3°32′1.8″W
- OS grid reference: SX 91828 92533
- Location: Mary Arches Street, Exeter
- Country: England
- Denomination: Anglican

Architecture
- Heritage designation: Grade I Listed

Administration
- Parish: Central Exeter

St Mary Arches Church is a small church in Exeter, Devon, England, which retains many Norman features. It was a place of worship for the Mayor of Exeter and local merchants during the 14th, 15th and 16th centuries. The Arches part of the name may come from a medieval arched thoroughfare which was located next to the church.

The church is largely made of red sandstone and is listed as Grade I by Historic England.

== Monuments ==
Within the church are monuments to the following persons:

- Christopher Lethbridge (d.1670), Mayor of Exeter in 1660.
