= John Lake (MP) =

English politician

John Lake (died 1421) of Exeter, Devon, was an English politician.

He was a member (MP) of the parliament of England for Exeter in October 1404 and 1411. He was Mayor of Exeter from July 1414 to October 1415.
