= Roger Beynim =

Roger Beynim (fl. 1288-1317), also known as Roger le Whetene, was a citizen, freeman and 14th century Mayor of the City of Exeter in the ceremonial county of Devon, England.

== Mayoralty ==
Beynim is first mentioned in a court case from 8 November 1288, when in his profession as a wine merchant, he was cited for unloading wines against a city statue.

He elected by the freemen of the council as mayor of Exeter eight times - in 1302, 1305, 1306, 1308, 1309, 1313, 1314, and 1317.

During his 1302–3 term, he was in dispute with the Lord of Kenton for not paying the murage, which funded the town walls, and was levied on wares and merchandise.

== Dispute with Earl of Devon ==
In 1309 he was in dispute with Hugh de Courtenay, Earl of Devon, the feudal baron of Okehampton, after being drawn into a dispute where the baron's Cator (the title of a household servant responsible for purchasing groceries) came to the market and argued with the Bishop's Cator about who could buy the only three pots of fish available in the market. Beynim decided that each should have one pot, with the third staying at the market for the other citizens, but de Courtenay felt himself wronged by this.

The Earl travelled to the city personally to confront Beynim, and having assembled a group of citizens for protection, Beynim met with de Courtnay. During the argument, Beynim took off his livery coat with de Courtenay's arms on it, and flung it to the ground, declaring that Exeter's mayor would only answer to the King. He subsequently ordered that no franchised man of the city would wear and livery or badge which was not of a freeman of Exeter.

As a result, the Earl took revenge by blocking passage of ships and boats to Exeter, using cut trees and stones to close the gap in the Countess Wear and by erecting two new weirs which prevented passage past his own land at Topsham. This forced merchants to use his Topsham port to unload goods, and pay the Earl for their passage to the city.
