= John Noseworthy (English politician) =

16th-century English politician

John Noseworthy (by 1481 – will proved 1531) was an English politician.

Noseworthy lived in Exeter, Devon.

He was a city bailiff in 1502 and 1516, before becoming mayor of Exeter in 1521. He was described by Richard Izacke in his 1677 book as "a very wise Man, professing the Laws of the Realm, who governed the City so well, as that none, or few before him did better, preferring the welfare of the publick before his own private affairs, reformed many abuses, and established many good orders herein".

His achievements as mayor included the creation of an archive in the council chamber, setting out the duties of each officer of the city, and preparing a store house for corn for the use of poor commoners during times of scarcity.

He was a Member (MP) of the Parliament of England for Exeter in 1523.
