= Robert Walker (MP) =

English merchant and politician

Robert Walker (c. 1597 – 23 August 1673) was an English merchant and politician who sat in the House of Commons of England from 1640 to 1643 and from 1661 to 1673. He was a strong Royalist during the English Civil War.

Walker was the son of Thomas Walker, a merchant of Exeter, and his wife Margery Baker, daughter of John Baker of Thorncombe, Devon. In 1622 he was made Freeman of Exeter. He was bailiff from 1626 to 1627 and was a common councilman from 1628 to about 1649. He was receiver from 1633 to 1634 and sheriff from 1634 to 1635. In 1636 he became governor of the merchant adventurers. He was Mayor of Exeter for 1639–40.

In April 1640, Walker was elected Member of Parliament for Exeter for the Short Parliament. In November 1640 he was re-elected as MP in the Long Parliament. He supported the King after 1642 and was disabled from sitting in parliament on 6 March 1643 for not appearing on diverse summons of the House. In April 1646 Walker was one of those who negotiated the surrender of Exeter to Parliament at Poltimore House.

After the Restoration, Walker was common councilman again from June 1660 and commissioner for assessment for Exeter from August 1660 until his death. He was elected MP for Exeter on 16 Apr 1661 for the Cavalier Parliament and held the seat until his death in 1673. From 1661 to 1663 he was commissioner for assessment for Devon. He was Deputy Lieutenant of Exeter from 1670.

Walker married firstly Margaret Parkins, daughter of John Parkins of Dorchester. He married secondly Mary Cotton, daughter of William Cotton, precentor of Exeter Cathedral on 19 May 1630. They had five sons and four daughters.

Parliament of England
| Vacant Parliament suspended since 1629 | Member of Parliament for Exeter; 1640–1643; With: Simon Snow | Succeeded by Simon Snow; Samuel Clark |
| Preceded by John Maynard; Thomas Bampfield | Member of Parliament for Exeter; 1661–1673; With: Sir James Smyth | Succeeded by Sir James Smyth; Thomas Walker |
