= Thomas Prestwood (died 1558) =

Thomas Prestwood (by 1500–58), of Exeter, Devon, was an English Member of Parliament (MP).

He was Mayor of Exeter 1544-5 and 1550–1.

Prestwood became Member of the Parliament of England for Exeter in 1547.
