= John Blackaller =

16th-century English politician

John Blackaller (around 1494–January 1563) of Exeter, Devon, was an English politician, who served as both Mayor of Exeter and Member (MP) for Exeter.

== Early and family life ==
Blackaller was born in Totnes in 1494, and was a Catholic.

Blackaller married Joan Hockemore in 1529 or earlier.

He had at least one daughter, who was married to William Peryam, who was mayor in 1532, and part of a family dynasty of Mayors of Exeter.

== Public service ==
Blackaller was a Member (MP) of the Parliament of England for Exeter in 1529. He was Mayor of Exeter in 1530–31, 1536–37 and 1548–49. He died in January 1563 and was buried on 21 January 1563.

== Law enforcement ==
As an alderman, Blackaller had law enforcement responsibilities, occasioning active measures, and he was involved in the putting down of an open riot against the dissolution of St Nicholas' Priory in 1536, where he was driven from the church.

In 1536–37, Blackaller was amongst those accused by Richard Lamprey of failure to punish treason, of which he was acquitted.

== Expropriation of church land ==
In 1537, Blackaller expropriated land at Shillingford which had been granted to the Dean and Chapter of Exeter Cathedral, refusing to pass rents on to the clerics.

In the 1560s, Blackaller was once again accused of withholding clerical dues from lands at Heavitree and Polsloe.

== Prayer book rebellion ==
During Blackaller's final term as Mayor of Exeter in 1549, the Prayer Book Rebellion took place following the release of the first Book of Common Prayer and related religious changes under Edward VI, suppressing the practice of Catholicism. Uprisings at Sampford Courtenay and Clyst St Mary escalated, with rebels building defensive works and blocking highways.

Devon Knight and Privy Councillor Peter Carew was tasked with quelling the uprising, but was unsuccessful, but did alert Blackaller to the danger, allowing Exeter to be brought to a state of defensive readiness. The midsummer eve celebrations were cancelled, which would normally have involved a ceremonial inspection of the city's defences, followed by a feast.

The rebel leaders did attempt to persuade the Catholic Blackaller to surrender the city, through numerous messages, but this approach was firmly rejected. Whilst Blackaller had sympathy with the cause, his dedication to the King and his duty were stronger than his religious conviction, for which later commentators have characterised him as heroic and courageous.

An initial force of around 2,000 rebel men gathered outside Exeter's city gates, initiating a five-week long siege.
