= Robert Vessy =

English politician

Robert Vessy (died 1430) was an English politician.

He was a member (MP) of the parliament of England for Exeter in March 1416 and 1422. He was Mayor of Exeter in 1425–26.
