= Thomas Andrew (MP) =

16th-century English politician

Thomas Andrew (by 1458 – 1517), of Exeter, Devon, was an English politician.

He was a member (MP) of the parliament of England for Exeter in 1510. He was Mayor of Exeter in 1513–14.
