= Peter Sturt =

English politician

Peter Sturt or Sterte (fl. 1413) of Exeter, Devon, was an English politician.

He was a member (MP) of the parliament of England for Exeter in February 1413. He was Mayor of Exeter in 1413–14 and 1415–16.
