= Gilbert Kirk =

Gilbert Kirk or Kirkeby (by 1484–1546), of Exeter, Devon, was an English Member of Parliament (MP).

He was a Member of the Parliament of England for Exeter in 1542. He was Mayor of Exeter 1531-2 and 1539–40.
