= Christopher Lethbridge (mayor) =

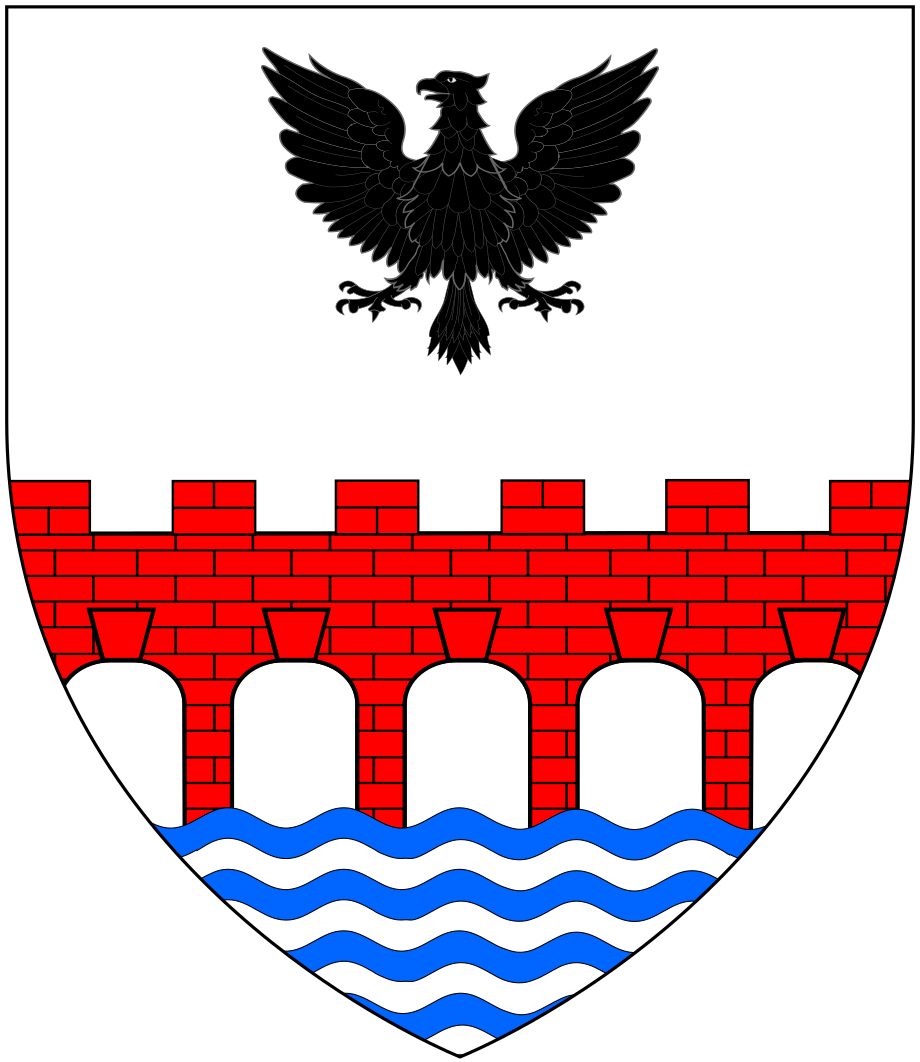
Canting arms of Lethbridge, as visible on mural monuments in St Mary Arches Church, Exeter, to Christopher Lethbridge (died 1670), Mayor of Exeter, and to his nephew Christopher Lethbridge (died 1713) of Westaway in Pilton Church, North Devon: Argent, over water proper, a bridge of five arches embattled gules in chief an eagle displayed sable. The eagle is said to represent the raven cognizance on the banner of the Norse king Ragnar Lodbrok (alias Lethbroke, etc), the family's supposed ancestor who invaded Britain.

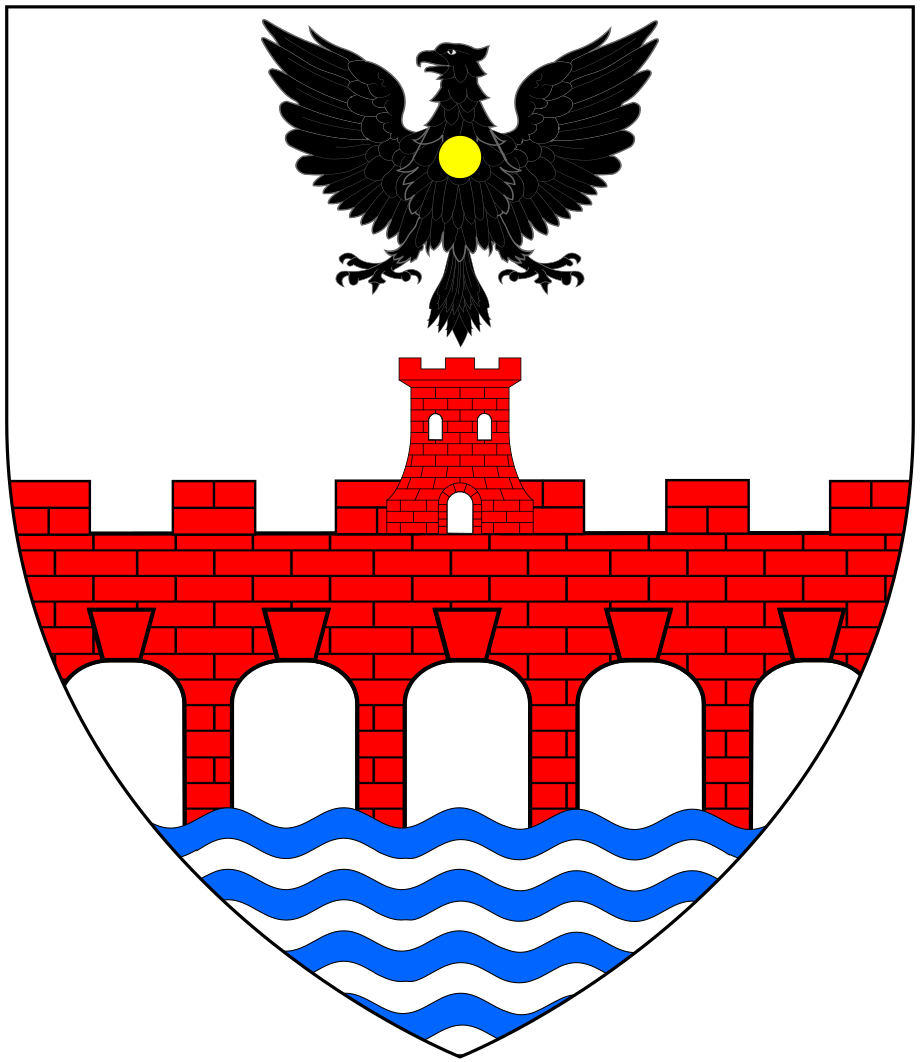
Canting arms of Lethbridge, as borne by the Lethbridge baronets today, which add a tower and bezant: Argent, over water proper, a bridge of five arches embattled gules and over the centre arch a turret in chief an eagle displayed sable charged on the breast with a bezant

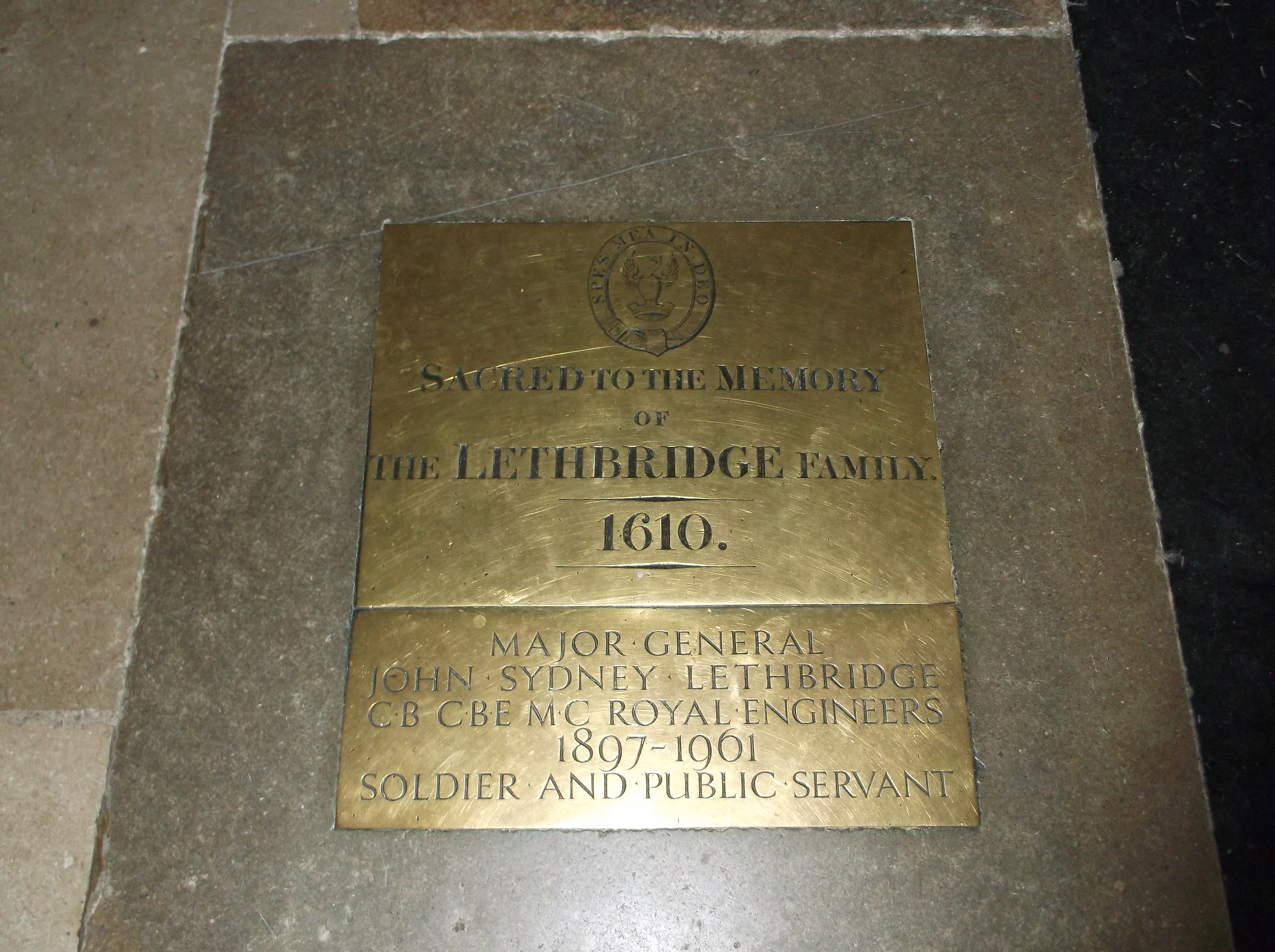
Monumental brass, Exeter Cathedral, in memory of the Lethbridge family

Christopher Lethbridge (died 1670) of Exeter in Devon, was Mayor of Exeter in 1660, and is one of the Worthies of Devon of the biographer John Prince, (1643–1723). His mural monument survives in St Mary Arches Church in Exeter.

== Origins ==
He was born at Walson, an estate listed in the Domesday Book of 1066, in the parish of Clannaborough, north of Okehampton and Crediton in Devon. The parish of Clannaborough adjoined on the south-west to the parishes of Bow, alias Nymet Tracy, and of Broad Nymet, of which latter he was lord of the manor at his death. Walson Barton is situated between the villages of Bow and Nymet Tracy. Prince did not record his parentage, however it is recorded in the Heraldic Visitations of Devon that Robert Lethbridge of Nimet Tracy married Alice Knapman, a daughter of Alexander Knapman of Throwley, Devon, probably circa 1600-20.

=== Other branches ===
Other branches of the Lethbridge family existed in the following Devonshire locations:

- Deckport, in the parish of Hatherleigh in Devon, an Elizabethan manor house in which survive two original plaster overmantels.
- Westaway, in the parish of Pilton, the seat of Christopher Lethbridge (died 1713), the Mayor's nephew. His descendants were created baronets in 1804.

== Earliest origins ==
The Lethbridge family is supposedly descended from Ragnar Lodbrok (alias Lethbroke, etc), a Norse king and saga-character of dubious historicity, possibly an amalgam of several historical ninth-century figures.

=== Legend 1 ===
The origin of the Lethbridge family is ascribed by legend (due to the "fancies of mellancholly monks", according to the historian Sir Winston Churchill (1620–1688), father of the 1st Duke of Marlborough) to have been in the person of "Lethbroke, a noble Dane", who having lost his hawk whilst out hunting by the sea-shore, got into a small boat to follow it and was blown onto the coast of Norfolk at Rodham. He was received by King Edmund, whose entertainment of him aroused jealousy in Beric, the royal falconer. Beric murdered Lethbroke, but the buried body was found by his spaniel dog, and he was convicted of the crime. His punishment was to be put in Lethbroke's own boat and set adrift. By chance he drifted not only back to Denmark, but to the very spot where Lethbroke had embarked. He was captured by the local Danes, who recognised Lethbroke's boat, and whom he informed falsely that Lethbroke had been killed by King Edmund. On hearing the story the King of Denmark dispatched an invasionary force to England, commanded by Lethbroke's two sons Hunga and Hubba. The sisters of the latter made a banner to be carried by their brothers, embroidered with a black raven, or eagle. Thus an eagle displayed sable features in the Lethbridge armorials.

=== Legend 2 ===
Sir Winston Churchill of Devon stated the true origins as follows: Reigner, King of Norway was driven out of his kingdom by Harold, King of Denmark, and turned to piracy. During one of his many raids on the north-east coast of England, he was shipwrecked off Norfolk, and captured by the local population, who killed him and whilst dragging his body around in derision, "called him in scorn Lothbroc, meaning "leather-breech", from the material of his trousers. He was soon avenged by three of his sons, Ivor, Hungar and Hubbo, who as younger sons in accordance with Norse custom had been banished from their own country to make a living abroad, and who invaded England near Appledore in North Devon. "Like young rooks drove from their nests, they took that bird for their cognizance, which being embroidered by their vestal sisters in a banner, consecrated after the horrid rites of their paganish superstition (which rendered it, as the vulgar believed impossible to be taken) they sate it up as the royal standard, calling it by the name of the "Reafan", i.e. the raven". The Raven standard inspired the invaders with "more than humane courage", but was insufficient to defeat the English at the battle which is supposed to have taken place at Hubbleston or "Hubba's Rock", between the villages of Northam and Bideford in North Devon.

== Career ==
In the words of Prince: "He was brought up in the City of Exeter at the gainful trade of a grocer, in the exercise of which he thrived so very well, by God's blessing upon his industry, that he 'rose as to considerable wealth and riches". In 1660 he was appointed Mayor of Exeter, "the highest seat of magistracy in that ancient and loyal city". "God was pleased to bless him with a considerable estate".

== Marriage and children ==
He married Mary Jurdaine (alias Jourdain) (died 1659) by whom he had ten children, of whom only one daughter and sole-heiress survived her father:

- Joan Lethbridge, who married William Trevill (died 1680) of Budockshed (alias Butshead, Budokeside, etc) in the parish of St Budeaux near Plymouth, Devon. Only remnants of the Trevill mansion of Budockshed survive, a few granite arches and outer walls. The Trevills were wealthy merchants from Plymouth who had purchased the manor of St Budeaux from Sir Arthur Gorges. By her husband she had children including a son Lethbridge Trevill (died 1699) and two daughters. The Trevill family is memorialised by a street name in Plymouth. In St Budeaux Church, below an elaborate monument to earlier members of the Trevill family, is a ledger stone inscribed as follows:

"Also Here Lyeth The Body of William Trevill of Butshead, Esq., Father of Lethbridge Trevill, who departed this Life the 18th Day of May, 1680. Also Here Lyeth the Body of Lethbridge Trevill, Son of William Trevill of Butshead, Esq., who departed this Life 27th of February, 1699".

== Death and burial ==
He died in 1670, having left a last will and testament dated 17 November 1669 in which he described himself as "merchant, of Exeter".

== Monument ==
His mural monument erected by his daughter Joan survives on the North wall of St Mary Arches Church in Exeter. Described by Pevsner as: "architectural, with painted grey marbling and other original colours revealed by recent cleaning". It displays on top the arms Argent, over water proper, a bridge of five arches embattled gules in chief an eagle displayed sable (Lethbridge) impaling Azure semée of cross-crosslets fitchée, a lion rampant or a chief of the last (Jourdain/Jurdaine). It is inscribed in Latin and English as follows:

Piae memoriae Christophori Lethbridge, Armigeri, huius civitatis nuper Praetoris, simul ac Mariae uxoris eius qui post varia pietatis et charitatis officia summa fidelitate peracta placide in Domino obdormiverunt: haec 15 Maii Anno Do(mi)ni 1659; ille 28 Julii Annoq(ue) Domini 1670.

Which mey be translated as:

"To the pious memory of Christopher Lethbridge, Esquire, recently Mayor of this city, and also to Mary his wife, who after having effected various offices of piety and charity with the highest fidelity, (both) calmly went to sleep in the Lord: he on 15 of May in the year of Our Lord 1659; she on 28 of July in the year of Our Lord 1670".

Two verses follow, one to each member of the couple, firstly for Mary:

Reader if thou more than the name wouldst hear,
For whom this hearse does thus appear,
The sober righteous godly men,
Will tell thee she was one like them:
A virtuous wife his help most meet,
Erst made her dress her winding sheet;
With children ten they both were blest,
One yet survives and nine at rest.

Secondly for Christopher:

"Failes this thy curiosity?
Then view his workes of charity:
The poor he did and doth relieve,
To him God gave a heart to give.
From hence that thou mayst profit make,
Do him for thine example take.
Stand not at gaze to feed thine eyes,
Give God the praise and doe likewise".

Below is further inscribed in Latin:

Johanna filia et heres unica superstes uxor Gulielmi Trevill de Butshead, Ar(migeri) in maerore(?) posiut, quae obiit 5^{o} (i.e. quinto) Julii A^{o} Dom(ini) 1706 ("Johanna his sole surviving daughter and heiress, the wife of William Trevill, Esquire, of Butshead, placed this (here) in (her) mourning, who died on the 5th of July in the year of Our Lord 1706")

== Charitable legacies ==
=== Almshouse in Exeter ===
By his last will and testament dated 17 November 1669 he founded an almshouse for six poor persons within the south gate of the City of Exeter, in the parish of The Holy Trinity. It provided them with the annual sum of £15 12 shillings.

=== Nymet Tracy annuity ===
By his will he also left an annuity of £5 10 shillings arising from his manor and barton of Broad Nymet (near Nymet Tracy) with which the churchwardens were to purchase "a middle sort of bread" every Lord's Day to 24 "poore of the parish of Bowe al(ia)s Nymett Traceye (who) go to the church and stay there every Lord's Day during the time of divine service and sermon (if any be)". The stipulations of the bequest are recorded as follows on a large 19th-century notice board which survives within the bell-tower of Bow Church.

"Christopher Lethbridge of ye City of Exon, Merch^{t.}, by his last will dated ye 17th of Nov^{r.} 1669 gave unto ye poor of ye parish of Bow al(ia)s Nymet Tracy in ye county of Devon, one annuity or yearly rent of five pounds and ten shillings, payable quarterly forever to be issuing out of the mannor of Broad Nymet in ye said county of Devon & bestowed in a middle sort of bread & given to four and twenty poor people of Bow al(ia)s Nymet Tracy afor^{sd.} by the churchwardens of ye said parish by equal portions every Lord's day. But to be given to none but such as shall attend ye church & stay there every Lord's day during ye time of divine service & sermon, if any be, unless such as cannot come thither by reason of some infermity (sic) or sickness".

His nephew Christopher Lethbridge (died 1713) of Westaway in the parish of Pilton, North Devon, whose "big and sumptuous" mural monument survives in Pilton Church, also bequeathed an annuity to the same cause, in the sum of 26 shillings, to be contributed as 12 pence of bread weekly between All Saints and 3 May or Rudemas-day. This is also recorded on the charity board in the church.
