= Simon Snow (MP) =

English politician

Simon Snow (1600 – February 1667) was an English politician who sat in the House of Commons of England from 1640 to 1648. He supported the Parliamentarian side during the English Civil War

Snow was the son of Thomas Snow of Exeter and his wife Grace Vilvayne. He became a merchant of Exeter and was an alderman of the town. He was a puritan and benefited by acquiring building materials from the dismantled houses belonging to the cathedral clergy.

In April 1640, Snow was elected Member of Parliament for Exeter for the Short Parliament. He was re-elected in November 1640 MP for Exeter for the Long Parliament. In December 1648 Snow was named as one of the Commissioners for settling Militia throughout England and Wales for Exeter. He was excluded from parliament under Pride's Purge in 1648.

In 1653 Snow was Mayor of Exeter. He also benefited from the will of his uncle Robert Vilvayne who left various charitable foundations. Snow inherited a brewhouse and malthouse, called the Common Brewhouse, "lately erected near the Duckingstool Mills, in Exe Island" which he also devised for charitable purposes. In 1657 Snow was one of a group of citizens who contributed to the building of a wall within the cathedral to separate presbyterian and independent worship.

Parliament of England
| Vacant Parliament suspended since 1629 | Member of Parliament for Exeter; 1640–1648; With: Robert Walker 1640–1643; Samuel Clark 1645–1648 | Succeeded by Samuel Clark |
