= Adam Scut =

English politician

Adam Scut (fl. 1382–1401) of Exeter, Devon, was an English politician.

He was a member (MP) of the parliament of England for Exeter in May 1382, April 1384 and 1401. He was Mayor of Exeter 1385–6, 1397–8, 1407–8 and 1411–12.
