= Butts Ferry =

Coordinates: 50.717887°N 3.530082°W

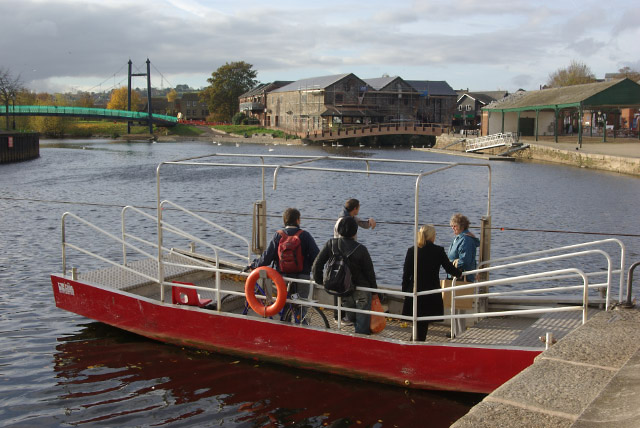
The Butts Ferry

The Butts Ferry is a hand-operated pedestrian cable ferry that crosses the River Exe in the city of Exeter in the English county of Devon. The crossing has been in use since at least 1641, but the name is more recent. The ferry is named after Mr George Butt, who fought to keep the ferry open when the City Council attempted to close it in 1971.

The ferry is currently operated using a 27 feet (8.2 m)-long aluminium-hulled ferry-boat that was new in 2005, and was custom designed to replace the previous wooden built ferry. The boat is manually pulled along a cable across the river, which is some 150 feet (46 m) wide at this point, by its operator.
