= Alphred Duport =

Alphred Duport (also written as Alured de la Porte) was a 13th-century freeman of the City of Exeter, Devon, in England. He served as Mayor of Exeter eight times, first in 1269, and for the last time in 1284. He was executed following his last tenure, for dereliction of duty.

== Mayoralty ==
Duport was elected as Mayor of Exeter eight times, during the reigns of Henry III and Edward I. He was appointed in 1269, 1275, 1276, 1278, 1280, 1281, 1283, and 1284.

== Execution ==
The Precentor of the cathedral, Walter Lechlade (also written as Lichlade or de Lecchelade) was murdered in the Cathedral Yard in November 1283, as he left from Matins at around 2 a.m.

The Cathedral Yard had six gates, and it was the responsibility of the City Council to lock the gates, and to keep the peace. It was assumed that the culprit fled through the South gate, which should have been locked an hour previously.

As the gate should have been locked, the keeper of the gate, Duport as the responsible officer of the city, and possibly some others, were both put on trial in 1285 and hanged.

George Oliver, in his 1861 History of the city of Exeter asserts that the execution of Duport may never have happened, and claims other sources are mistaken, primarily as he does not believe that this execution was within the character of the King, although other authors dismiss Oliver's position for lacking evidence, and pointing to the contemporary records.
