= Robert Hooker (MP) =

Robert Hooker or Hoker, alias Vowell (by 1466–1537), of Exeter, Devon, was an English Member of Parliament (MP).

He was a Member of the Parliament of England for Exeter in 1529. He was Mayor of Exeter 1529–30. He died during a plague outbreak.
