= Countess Wear =

Area of Exeter in Devon, England

Coordinates: 50°42′01″N 3°29′36″W

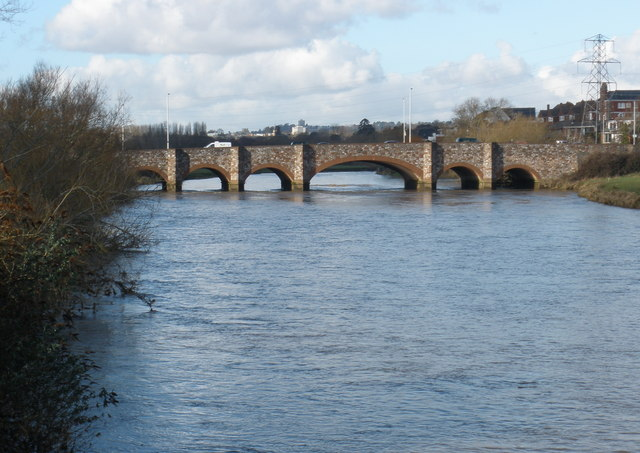
Countess Wear bridge dating from 1774, over the River Exe

Countess Wear is a district within the city of Exeter, Devon, England. It lies about two miles south-east of the city centre, on the north bank of the estuary of the River Exe. Historically an estate known as Weare, part of the manor of Topsham, was in this area. From the late 13th century, the construction of weirs in the River Exe by the Countess, and later, the Earls of Devon damaged the prosperity of Exeter to the benefit of Topsham which was downstream of the obstructions, and was owned by the Earls.

The bridges over the river and the adjacent Exeter Ship Canal were for many years a traffic bottleneck, until the completion of the last section of the M5 motorway, further downstream, in 1977.

== History ==
The manor of Topsham was granted by King Henry I to Richard de Redvers and became part of his feudal barony of Plympton. The estate, or sub-manor of Weare was part of this. The present manor house was built in Georgian style by Sir John Duckworth, 1st Baronet in about 1804. It is now the club house of Exeter Golf and Country Club.

The weir was commonly known as Countess Wear as early as the fourteenth century: it is named after a weir that Isabella de Fortibus, Countess of Devon is said to have erected in the river hereabouts in the late 13th century. The details of the weir's construction are uncertain: a source of 1290 states that the countess had it built in 1284 and thereby damaged the salmon fishing and prevented boats from reaching Exeter; but a later source claims that her weir was built before 1272, leaving a thirty-foot gap in the centre through which boats could pass, until it was blocked between 1307 and 1377 by her cousin Hugh de Courtenay, 9th Earl of Devon and his son, Hugh de Courtenay, 2nd/10th Earl of Devon. The blocking up in 1307 was recorded in Exeter City Council records, and noted as being as a result of a conflict between de Courtenay and then-Mayor of the city Roger Beynim over whether fish in the market should be given to the Earl or the cathedral.

The weirs built by the Earls of Devon across the river prevented ships reaching Exeter, thereby forcing merchants to land goods at their port of Topsham, which therefore prospered. Despite several petitions to the king by the people of Exeter, the weirs remained until 1538 when Henry Courtenay, 1st Marquess of Exeter was attainted which resulted in all his possessions reverting to the Crown. In 1540, an Act of Parliament was passed to remove the obstructions, but it was found to be impossible to restore the navigation, and work was soon started to build the Exeter Canal to bypass the blocked section of the river.

Countess Isabella also constructed a corn mill in the area in 1284. It was rebuilt as a paper mill in 1658, destroyed by fire in the early 19th century and restored and in continued operation until 1885. The remains of the building are still standing.

During World War II, Countess Wear was the location of a US Navy base, and the bridge over the canal was used for rehearsing a glider attack on the Pegasus and Horsa Bridges in Normandy by the Oxfordshire and Buckinghamshire Light Infantry. A plaque to commemorate this event was installed on the bridge in 1994. After the war, accommodation at the navy base was converted into temporary housing for people in Exeter whose homes had been damaged or destroyed.

== Transport ==
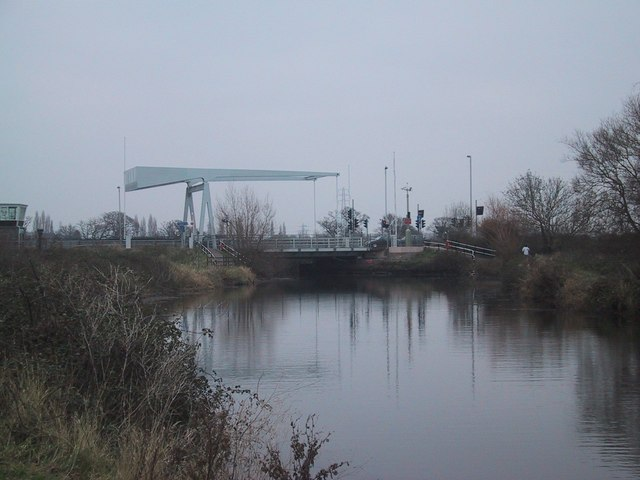
Bascule bridge over the Exeter Canal

Countess Wear lends its name to a nearby set of bridges across the River Exe and the Exeter Canal. The first bridge was built in 1770, and was originally tolled, charging 1 penny for foot traffic and 1 shilling for a coach and six horses. It originally had six arches, in 1842 the two central arches were replaced by a 60ft arch to allow boats to pass through.

In 1935, the bridges were reconstructed for motor traffic as part of a bypass around Exeter, which had become increasingly congested as a bottleneck for holiday traffic heading to southwest England. The river bridge was widened from 13 feet 7 inches (4.14 m) to 45 feet (14 m) to allow two-way traffic with a pair of footpaths. This bridge was Grade II listed in 2004. The canal was crossed by a new electric swing bridge. The new bridges were opened by the Minister of Transport, Leslie Burgin on 22 February 1938 at a total cost of £230,000.

A bascule bridge was built alongside the swing bridge to increase traffic flow in 1972, and although this greatly improved traffic flow, the bridges were still inadequate for modern-day traffic requirements, leading to the parallel M5 motorway being constructed downstream. The replacement motorway was opened by the Prime Minister, James Callaghan in May 1977.

At the centre of the area is the Countess Wear roundabout, where the old Exeter Bypass meets the crossroads for the Topsham Road.

== Education ==
There are three schools in the area:

- Countess Wear Community School
- Southbrook School
- The West of England School for the Partially Sighted

== Community buildings ==
There is one church in the area:

- St Luke's Church (1837–38), Countess Wear Road.

The village hall was rebuilt in 2016. The previous hall was built in 1922 by local men returning from the war, on land given for that purpose by Lady Granger.
