= Mayor of Exeter =

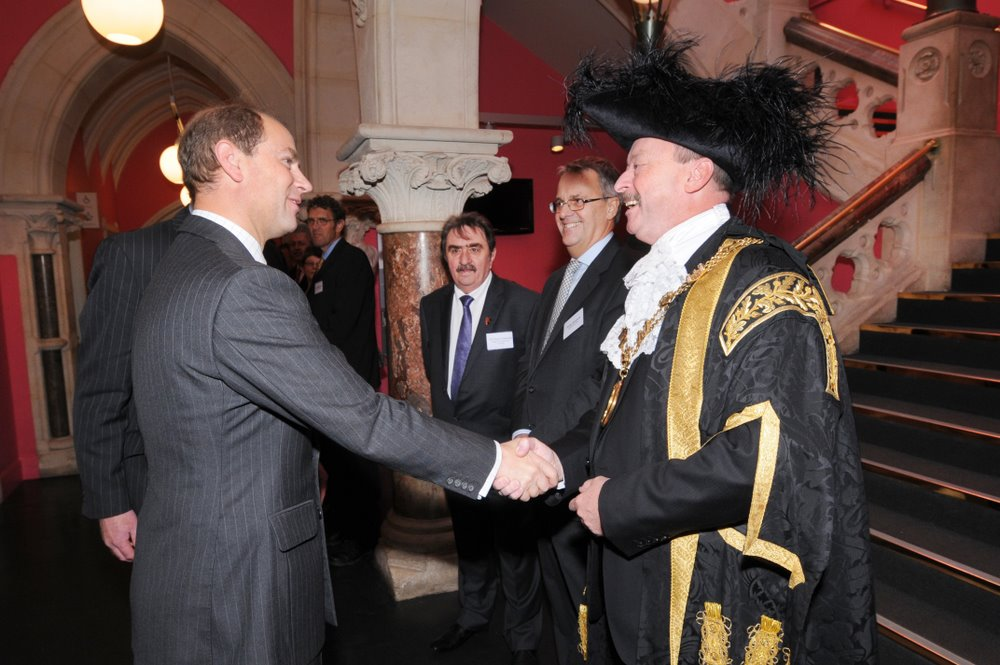
Prince Edward, Earl of Wessex meets the Mayor of Exeter (Robert Newby) in the entrance to the Royal Albert Memorial Museum in Exeter in October 2012

The Mayor of Exeter, granted Lord Mayor of Exeter in 2002, is the Mayor of Exeter in the ceremonial county of Devon, England and is elected by and from within the councillors of the City of Exeter council. The position is the third oldest mayoralty in the United Kingdom, behind the Lord Mayor of London and Mayor of Winchester, being founded in 1200.

In modern times, the role of the Lord Mayor is to "represent, support, and promote the businesses and people of Exeter" and the incumbent officer is expected to be non-political during their period of service.

== History ==
=== Foundation ===
London was the first city to appoint a mayor (which continues today as the Lord Mayor of London), and this was followed in 1200 by the Mayor of Winchester. Exeter followed shortly after, and the mayoralty was formed in 1200 (or as late as 1205 in some references), making it the third position of mayor created.

At formation, the powers of the Mayor were extensive, with control over regulating trades including baking and brewing, as well as the markets and security of the city walls.

The first mayor was Henry Rifford, who served seven terms, and 19 other mayors have served five or more terms.

Roger Beynim was mayor eight times between 1302 and 1317, but during one of his terms, a dispute with Hugh de Courtenay, Earl of Devon, the feudal baron of Okehampton started after being drawn into a dispute over the fish available in the market, which resulted in Beynim discarding his livery with the Earl's crest and declaring that the Mayor of Exeter would only be answerable to the King. The recrimination from this event led to the blocking of the Countess Wear and ships and boats being blocked from accessing Exeter by the river until a canal was built in the 1560s.

In 1345, Edward III codified that the city be governed by 12 freemen (later increased to 24 by Henry VIII in 1509), with a purview over finance and other matters. The structure of a governing body was decided in 1497 by Henry VII, and remained unchanged until 1835.

Under the 24 councillor system, eight were aldermen who were elected for life by the freemen, and only replaced upon their death, as well as fifteen common councillors. The mayor and aldermen were all magistrates and presided at trials. The chamber controlled the city corporation, which in turn ran services in the city.

=== Reform acts ===
The passage of the Reform Act 1832 made major changes, which included giving votes to a much wider range of people, including many (male) small landowners, shopkeepers, and householders, who had previously been disenfranchised. Prior to this, Exeter had only 586 freemen who were entitled to vote, or to site on the city council, from a population of over 28,000.

The Municipal Corporations Act 1835 reformed the chamber, with the chamber increasing to 36 councillors, with a third up for election every year. Aldermen were now appointed for a maximum of six years, rather than for life.

Through the 1860s, a number of bills were debated in parliament, resulting in the passing of the Reform Act 1867 further lowered the entry requirements to be represented.

=== Loss of county status ===
As a result of the Local Government Act 1972, Exeter lost its county borough status in 1974, and became a district council under Devon County Council. This reduced the scope of the council and mayoralty.

=== Lord mayor status ===
The role of Mayor was granted the dignity and style of Lord Mayor by letters patent dated 1 May 2002 as the result of a competition to celebrate the Golden Jubilee of Elizabeth II.

== Former mayors ==
Robert Wilsford served the most terms of any mayor, serving 12 terms between 1374 and 1394.

Alphred Duport was elected mayor eight times, first in 1269, and for the last time in 1284. He was executed following his last tenure, for dereliction of duty. The Precentor of the cathedral, Walter Lechlade had been murdered in November 1283, and the culprit fled through the south gate at a time when it should have been locked. The keeper of the gate, and Duport as the responsible officer of the city, were both hanged.

More recently, Rowland Glave Saunders served six terms in office, due to the outbreak of World War II.

A number of mayors were also Members of Parliament (mostly for Exeter), including:

- Adam Scut, Mayor 4 times between 1385 and 1410
- Peter Sturt, Mayor twice in 1413 and 1415
- John Lake, Mayor in 1414
- Robert Vessy, Mayor in 1425
- Richard Hewet, Mayor twice in 1506 and 1513
- Thomas Andrew, Mayor in 1513
- John Noseworthy, Mayor in 1521
- John Simon, Mayor twice in 1512 and 1523
- Robert Hooker, Mayor in 1529
- John Blackaller, Mayor in 1530
- Gilbert Kirk, Mayor in 1542
- Thomas Prestwood, Mayor twice in 1544 and 1550
- George Smith, Mayor three times in 1586, 1597, and 1607
- Robert Walker, Mayor in 1639
- Simon Snow, Mayor in 1653
- John Snell, Mayor three times in 1687, 1689, and 1700
- Albert Dunn, Mayor twice consecutively in 1901 and 1902

Local pub landlord Robert Pople was elected for three consecutive terms, the first in 1895, following a rise in popularity due to his actions during the Exeter Theatre Royal fire.

The first female mayor was Minnie Nichols, a Conservative councillor who was elected in 1966.
