= Richard Gard =

British politician

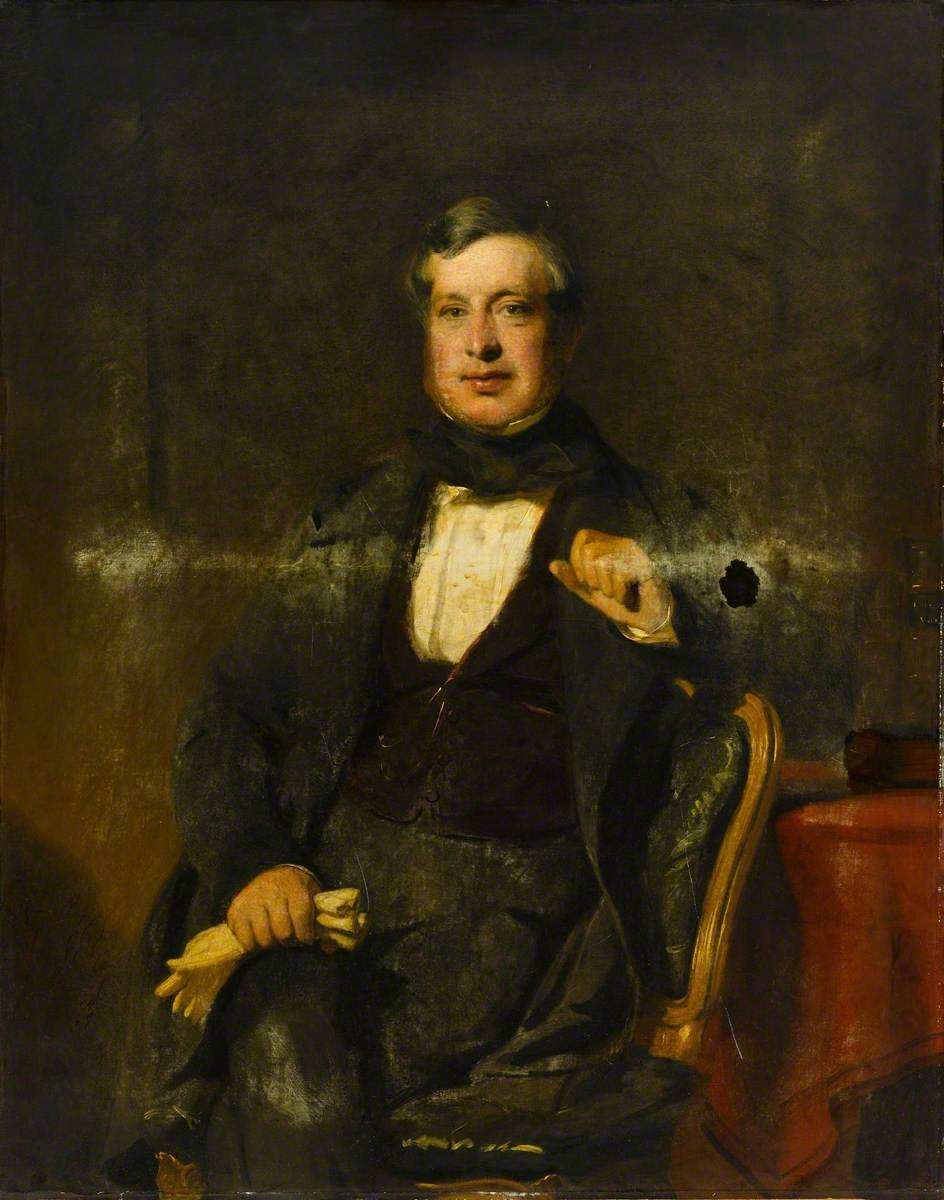

Member of Parliament for Exeter
- In office 27 March 1857 – 11 July 1865 Serving with Edward Courtenay (1864–1865); Edward Divett (1857–1864)
- Preceded by: John Duckworth; Edward Divett
- Succeeded by: John Coleridge; Edward Courtenay

Personal details
- Born: 1797
- Died: 16 December 1868 (aged 71)
- Party: Conservative

Richard Sommers Gard (1797 – 16 December 1868) was a British Conservative politician.

After failing at Honiton in 1852, Gard was elected Conservative MP for Exeter at the 1857 general election and held the seat until 1865 when he did not seek re-election at that year's general election.

Parliament of the United Kingdom
Preceded by John Duckworth; Edward Divett	Member of Parliament for Exeter; 1857–1865; With: Edward Courtenay (1864–1865); Edward Divett (1857–1864)	Succeeded by John Coleridge; Edward Courtenay
