= Elizabeth Courtenay =

Elizabeth Courtenay may refer to:

- Elizabeth Grey, Viscountess Lisle, married name Courtenay, Tudor noblewoman
- Elizabeth of Courtenay (ca. 1199–1269 or later), daughter of Peter II of Courtenay and Yolanda of Flanders
- Elizabeth Courtenay, Countess of Devon (1801–1867), formerly Lady Elizabeth Fortescue

== See also ==
- Elizabeth Courtney (disambiguation)
