= Attorney General Follett =

Attorney General Follett may refer to:

- Rosemary Follett (born 1948), Attorney General of the Australian Capital Territory
- William Webb Follett (1796–1845), Attorney General for England and Wales

== See also ==
- Bronson La Follette (1936–2018), Attorney General of Wisconsin
