= St. Mary's Church, Pune =

Church building in Pune, India

St Mary's Church
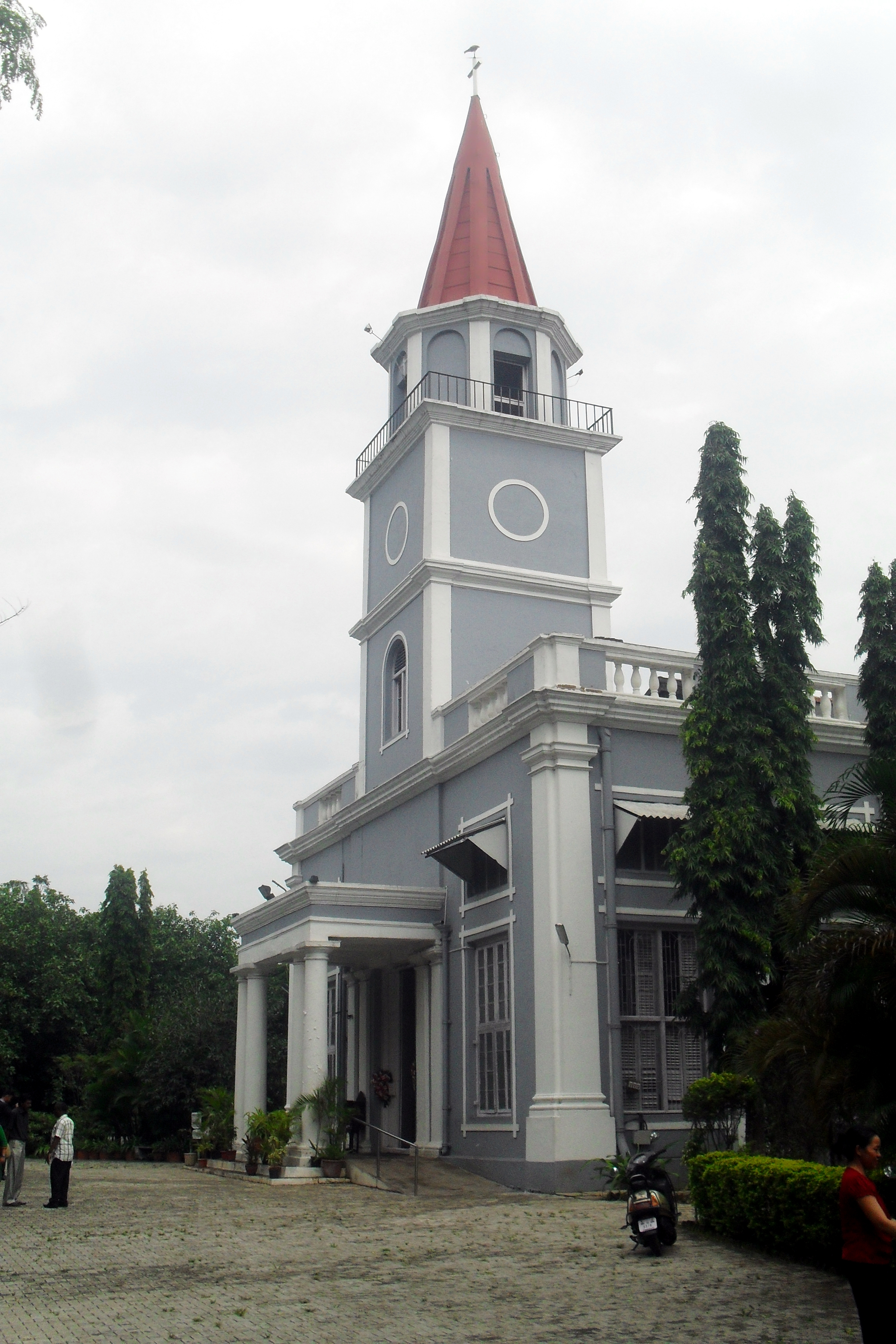
- 18°30′28″N 73°53′04″E
- Location: Pune Camp
- Country: India

St. Mary's Church is Protestant church located in the Pune Cantonment, Maharashtra state, India. It is the oldest church in the Deccan region and thus is known as the "mother church of the Deccan". The church was built to meet the spiritual needs of the British soldiers stationed in and around Pune. Inspired by the St Martin-in-the-Fields Church in London, the church was designed by Lieutenant Nash of the East India Company's Engineers.

The foundations of the building were laid by Bishop Reginald Heber, the Bishop of Calcutta, in 1825. He described the church to be a large building but in bad architectural taste. A 1,500-member congregation worships there every Sunday, and the church currently is under the jurisdiction of the Church of North India.

== Burials and memorials ==
Being a garrison church, St. Mary's contains many memorials of the British soldiers who served in various wars and battles. The stones and plaques commemorate many figures; prominent amongst them is the memorial of Brevet Lieutenant Colonel and Major William Morris of Fishleigh, Hatherleigh, Devon, one of the few survivors from the battle of Balaclava.

The church also houses the remains of Sir Robert Grant, one of the queen's Most Honourable Privy Councillors and the Governor of Bombay. He was the author of a volume of sacred poems that contains some hymns which have found their way into modern hymnals. His most well-known hymn, "O Worship the King", based on Psalm 104, is regularly sung at the church and is an anthem during the church's anniversary.

The church also houses the remains of Sir Edward West, the Chief Justice of Supreme Court at Bombay, which was established in 1823 by the East India Company.

Beside the memorials and plaques, the colors of the 25th Bombay Infantry are laid to rest there.
