= Elizabeth Courtney =

Elizabeth Courtney may refer to:

- Eliza Courtney (1792–1859), illegitimate daughter of Prime Minister Charles Grey, 2nd Earl Grey and Georgiana, Duchess of Devonshire
- Elizabeth Courtney (died 1974), dressmaker for Hollywood film actresses

== See also ==
- Elizabeth Courtenay (disambiguation)
