= List of settlements in Devon by population =

Coordinates: 50.7°N 3.8°W

Interactive map showing the location of the towns and cities within Devon. The size of the circle corresponds to the size of its 2011 population and the shade of blue or red to its population growth or decline respectively.

This list is of towns and cities in Devon in order of their population, according to the 2021 census data from the Office for National Statistics. It comprises the Key Statistics for local authorities and civil parishes that attempt to show their populations. The largest settlement in Devon is the city and unitary authority of Plymouth with a population of 264,695, whereas the smallest settlement was the town and civil parish of Beer with a population of 1,283. The city of Exeter, which is home to Exeter Cathedral, is the county town and headquarters of Devon County Council. The ceremonial county of Devon includes unitary authority areas of Plymouth and Torbay, but the non-metropolitan county of Devon excludes such unitary authority areas. It is governed by Devon County Council, whereas Plymouth and Torbay can govern themselves on matters such as transport and education.

Traditionally a town is any settlement which has received a charter of incorporation, more commonly known as a town charter, approved by the monarch. However, since 1974, any civil parish has the right to declare itself as a town. Prior to 1888, city status was given to settlements home to a cathedral of the Church of England such as Exeter. After 1888 it was no longer a necessary condition, leading to Plymouth gaining city-status in 1928. Historical towns such as Plympton, Stonehouse and Devonport, which were merged into the city of Plymouth, have not been included, as well as Topsham, which became a part of Exeter's urban district, and St Marychurch, which was annexed by Torquay. However, the unitary authority area of Torbay recognises the three towns of Torquay, Paignton and Brixham.

Changes to population structures have, however, led to explosions in non-traditional settlements that do not fall into traditional, bureaucratic definitions of 'towns'. Several villages, which are not included in this list, have grown steadily and are more populous than many towns. For example, the ward of Fremington, with a population of 5,231 would be ranked 35 whilst its neighbour Braunton civil parish, with a population of 8,210, would be ranked 23.

2011 rank	Town/city	Population			Notes	Image
2011 rank	Town/city	2021	2011	2001	Notes	Image
1	Plymouth	264,695	256,384	240,720	City and unitary authority, which includes the suburbs of Plympton and Plymstock. Plympton used to be a separate town and Plymstock is a parish.	
2	Exeter	130,709	117,773	111,076	City, urban district and the county town (capital) of Devon. Includes Topsham.	
3	Paignton	67,488	62,753	62,761	Part of the unitary authority of Torbay. Wards such as Cockington, Torquay station, and Torbay Hospital are included here rather than in Torquay.	
4	Torquay	52,037	48,563	46,650	Part of the unitary authority of Torbay	
5	Exmouth	35,488	34,432	32,972	Civil parish	
6	Newton Abbot	26,746	24,029	23,580	Civil parish	
7	Barnstaple	23,976	24,033	20,724	Civil parish	
8	Tiverton	22,291	21,335	18,621	Civil parish	
9	Bideford	18,260	16,610	14,407	Civil parish	
10	Brixham	16,825	16,693	17,457	Civil parish; part of the unitary authority of Torbay.	
11	Dawlish	15,257	13,161	13,135	Civil parish	
12	Teignmouth	14,932	14,749	14,413	Civil parish	
13	Sidmouth	14,377	13,737	13,135	Civil parish	
14	Tavistock	12,675	12,280	11,604	Civil parish	
15	Northam	12,356	12,062	11,018	Civil parish	
16	Kingsteignton	11,935	10,451	10,615	Civil parish	
17	Ivybridge	11,901	11,851	12,056	Civil parish	
18	Honiton	11,316	11,156	10,857	Civil parish	
19	Ilfracombe	11,042	11,509	10,840	Civil parish	
20	Cullompton	10,492	8,499	7,609	Civil parish	
21	Totnes	8,240	7,456	7,444	Civil parish	
22	Axminster	8,118	6,557	5,626	Civil parish	
23	Crediton	8,070	7,600	6,837	Civil parish	
24	Bovey Tracey	7,996	7,168	6,929	Civil parish	
25	Ottery St. Mary	7,986	6,712	6,054	Civil parish	
26	Seaton	7,693	7,096	6,798	Civil parish	
27	Okehampton	7,313	7,104	5,846	Civil parish	
28	South Molton	6,354	4,875	4,093	Civil parish	
29	Great Torrington	5,797	5,714	5,279	Civil parish	
30	Kingsbridge	5,683	5,887	5,521	Civil parish	
31	Dartmouth	5,259	5,605	5,512	Civil parish	
32	Budleigh Salterton	5,240	5,185	4,801	Civil parish	
33	Chudleigh	4,752	4,378	3,846	Civil parish	
34	Exminster	4,644	3,616	3,310	Civil parish	
35	Ashburton	4,224	4,087	3,909	Civil parish	
36	Buckfastleigh	3,571	3,631	3,661	Civil parish	
37	Holsworthy	3,475	2,641	2,256	Civil parish	
38	Colyton	2,374	2,316	2,193	Civil parish	
39	Bradninch	2,165	2,206	1,916	Civil parish	
40	North Tawton	2,119	1,859	1,570	Civil parish	
41	Modbury	2007	1,677	1,454	Civil parish	
42	Hatherleigh	1,902	1,729	1,306	Civil parish	
43	Hartland	1,864	1,724	1,676	Civil parish	
44	Bampton	1,842	1,791	1,598	Civil Parish	
45	Moretonhampstead	1,728	1,703	1,536	Civil parish	
46	Salcombe	1,584	1,909	1,893	Civil parish	
47	Chulmleigh	1,582	1,323	1,308	Civil parish	
48	Chagford	1,539	1,449	1,470	Civil parish	
49	Lynton and Lynmouth	1,405	1,441	1,513	Civil parish. Includes the town of Lynton and the village of Lynmouth.	
50	Beer	1,283	1,317	1,381	Civil parish	

== See also ==
- List of urban areas in the United Kingdom
- List of English districts by population
