= William Morris (British Army officer) =

British Army officer (1820–1858)

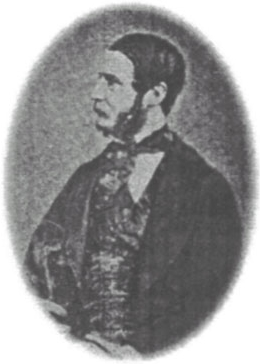
- Lieutenant-Colonel William Morris, CB
- Born: 18 December 1820; Fishleigh, Hatherleigh, Devon, England, United Kingdom
- Died: 11 July 1858 aged 37; Poona, India
- Military career
- Allegiance: United Kingdom
- Branch: British Army
- Rank: Lieutenant-Colonel
- Conflicts: Crimean War
- Awards: Companion of the Order of the Bath

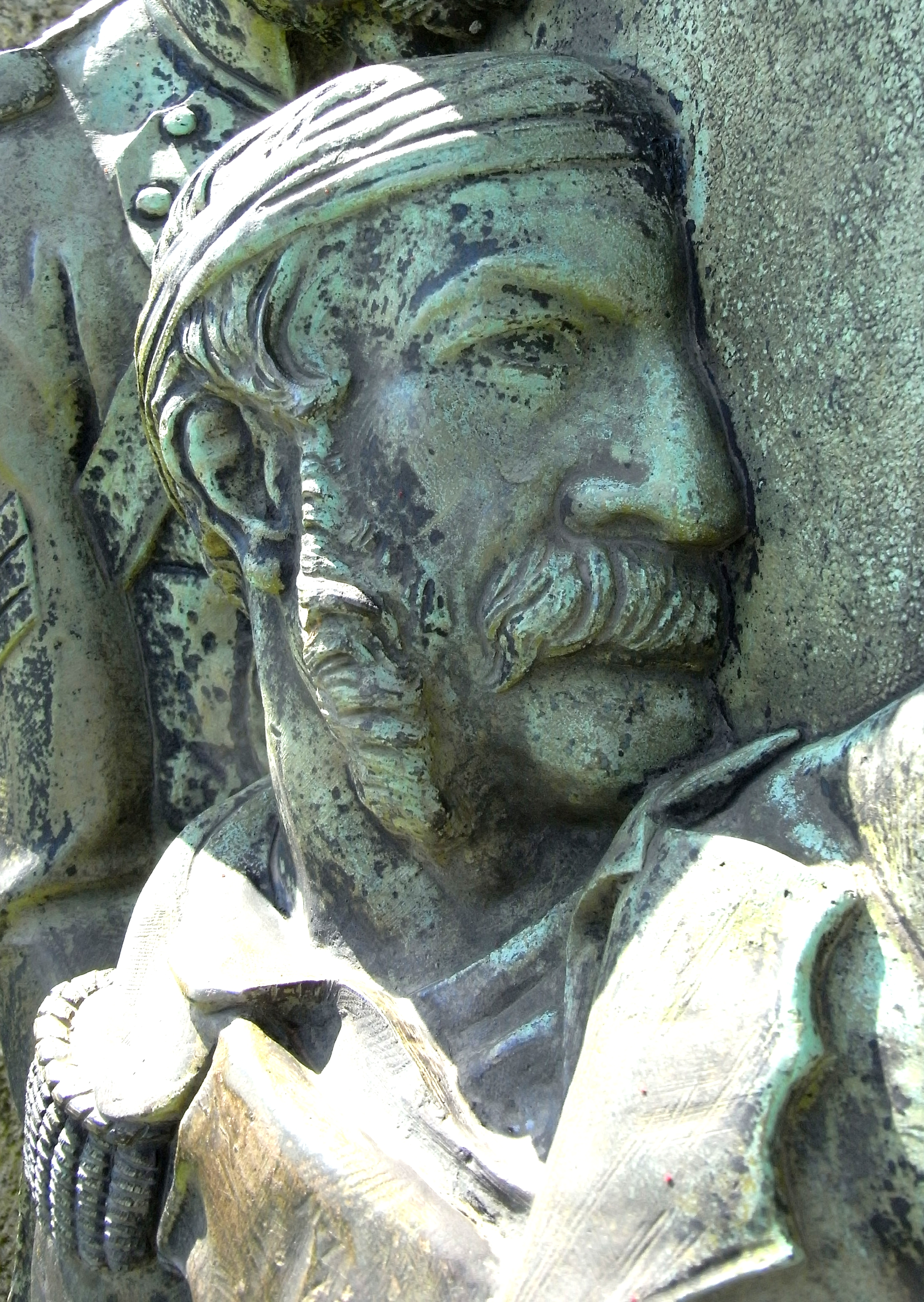
Captain William Morris, detail from 1860 bronze relief sculpted by Edward Bowring Stephens, on his monumental obelisk on Hatherleigh Moor, Devon

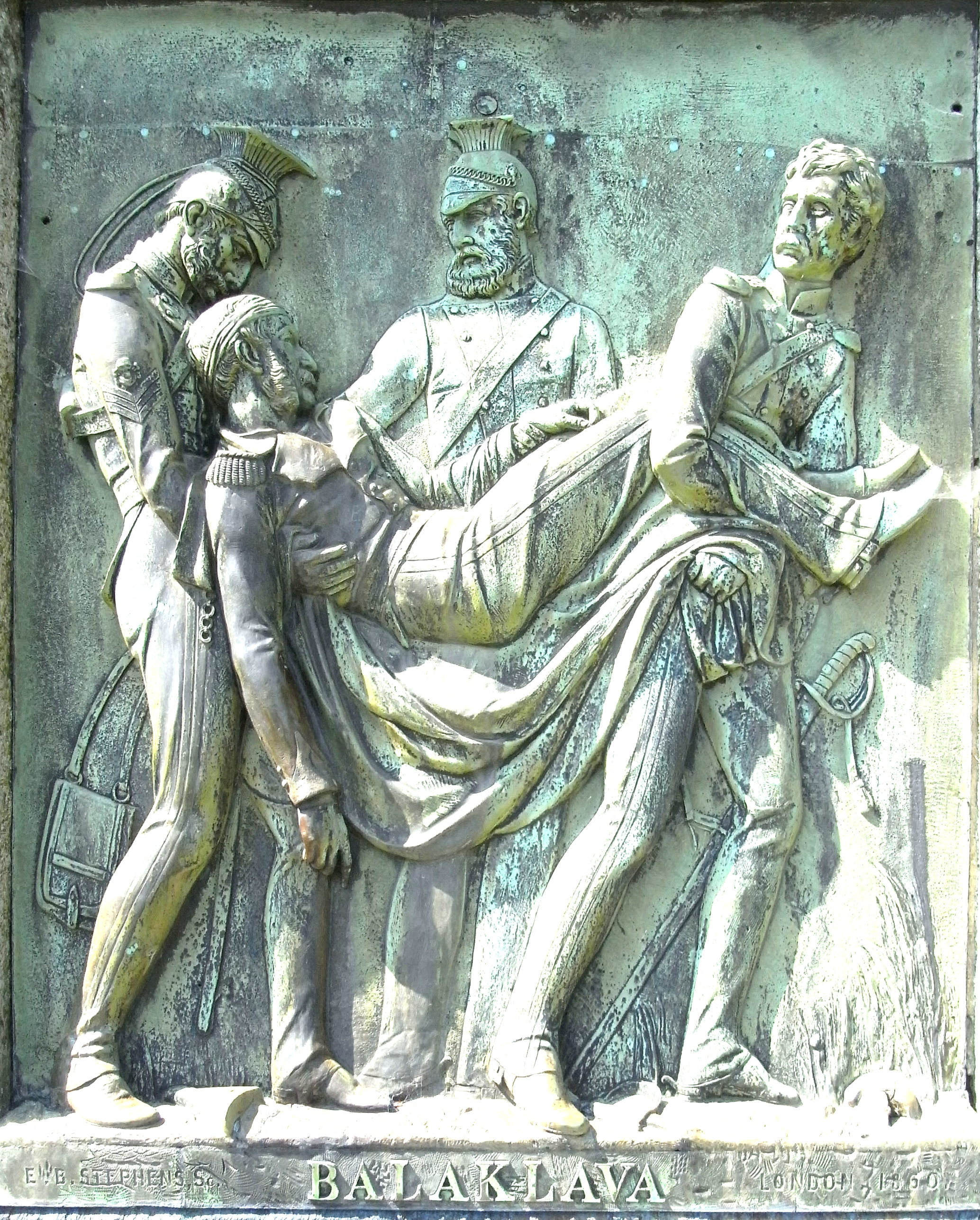
Captain William Morris, 1860 bronze relief panel sculpted by Edward Bowring Stephens, on his monumental obelisk on Hatherleigh Moor, Devon. Inscribed on base: "BALAKLAVA"

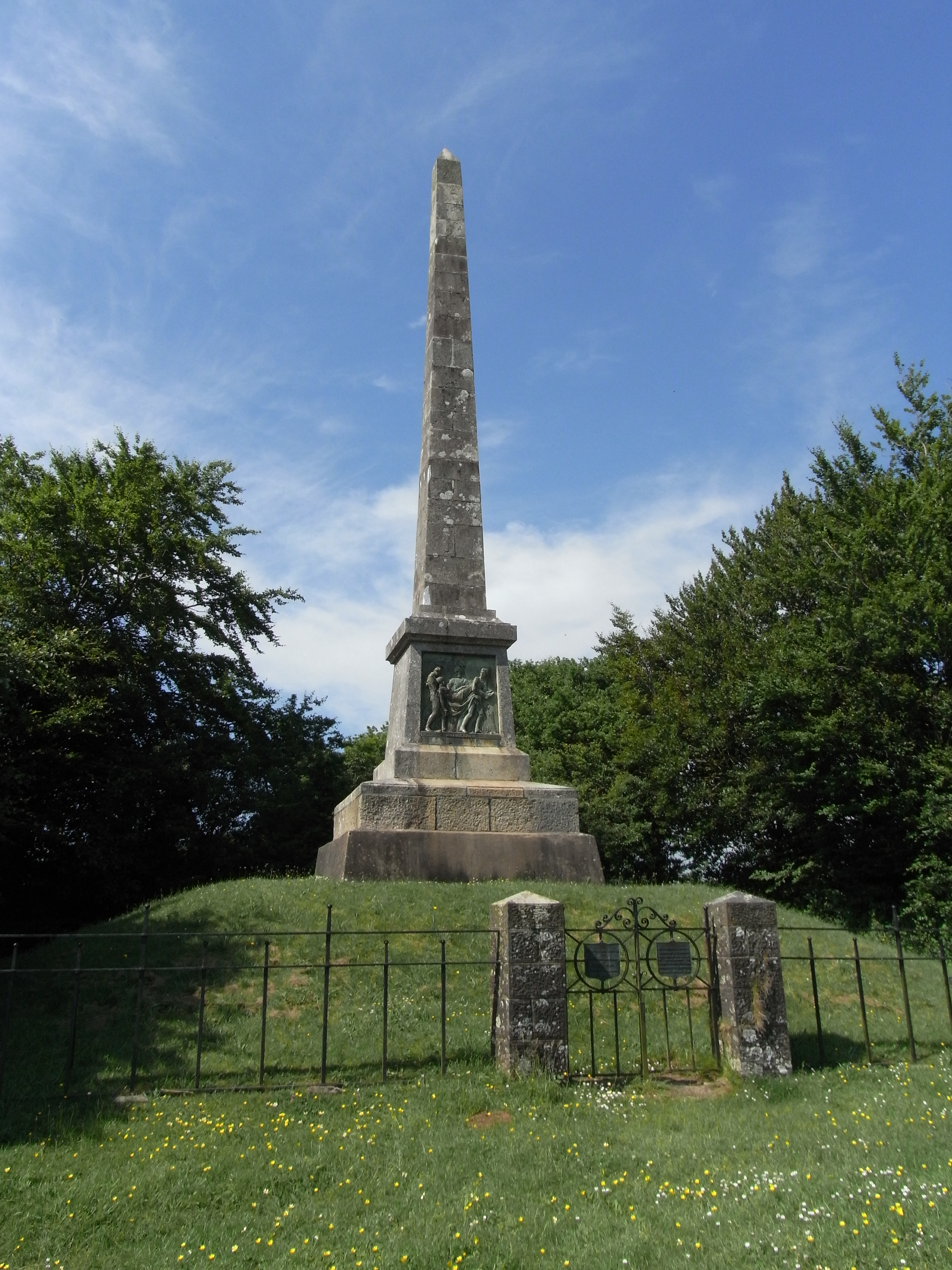
1860 monumental obelisk on Hatherleigh Moor, Devon, to Captain William Morris (1820–1858). With bronze relief sculpture by Edward Bowring Stephens inscribed: "BALAKLAVA"

Lieutenant-Colonel William Morris CB (18 December 1820 – 11 July 1858) was a British Army officer who rode in the Charge of the Light Brigade.

== Early life and education ==
He was born on 18 December 1820 at Fishleigh in the parish of Hatherleigh in Devon, the eldest of four sons (there were also five daughters) of William Cholmeley Morris of Fishleigh and Inwardleigh, and Jane, daughter of James Veale (who following an inheritance had changed his name by deed-poll from "Mallet"). His youngest brother, Colonel Montague Cholmeley Morris, had been a lieutenant in the 75th Regiment, who served during the Indian Mutiny. He was educated at home before matriculating at St John's College, Cambridge in 1839. His short, stocky build combined with his strength led him to be described as a "pocket Hercules".

== Early service in India ==
On 18 June 1842 he was commissioned by purchase as a cornet in the 16th Light Dragoons (Lancers). The regiment was stationed in India, and Morris sailed from Gravesend in July 1842, joining his regiment at Meerut in April 1843. Morris served with the regiment in the Gwalior campaign, seeing action at the Battle of Maharajpore on 29 December 1843 and being awarded the Gwalior Star. On 14 May 1845 he was promoted to lieutenant, without purchase. While serving with the 16th he was given the nickname "Slacks".

Morris commanded a troop of the 16th through the First Anglo-Sikh War, serving at the Battle of Buddiwal on 11 January 1846, at the Battle of Aliwal on 28 January, where he was wounded, and at the Battle of Sobraon on 10 February. After the conclusion of the war he applied for leave, and returned to England in May 1846, going on half-pay. During his time in India he became a "firm friend" of Louis Nolan, an officer with a keen interest in cavalry warfare but whose regiment, the 15th Hussars, was stationed at Bangalore and had not participated in the recent conflict.

== Service in Britain and marriage ==
On 19 February 1847 Morris exchanged from the 16th to the 17th Light Dragoons, another Lancer regiment, joining the regiment in Dublin. In 1849 he attended the Senior Department of the Royal Military College, passing out in 1851. He purchased his promotion to captain on 25 April 1851, and in 1852 married Amelia, daughter of Major-General Thomas William Taylor CB, of Ogwell, a fellow-landowner in Devon and sometime Lieutenant-Governor of the Royal Military College.

== Crimean War ==
On the outbreak of war with Russia in 1854, Morris was appointed Deputy Assistant Quartermaster-General in the Cavalry Division of the Army of the East, leaving for Turkey in April. While at Varna he contracted cholera, and did not participate in the initial invasion of the Crimea, only joining the army besieging Sebastopol in October, where the 17th Lancers were also present as part of the Light Cavalry Brigade. Their commanding officer, Lieutenant-Colonel John Lawrenson, had been sent home sick, so when Major Augustus Saltren Willett died of cholera on 22 October, Morris, as senior captain, was entitled to take command of the regiment. Despite being weakened by his illness and a "complete stranger" to the men of the 17th, he chose to exercise this right rather than remain on the staff. He was therefore in command of the regiment at the Battle of Balaclava on 25 October 1854, still wearing his staff-officer's frock-coat and cap and riding his charger "Old Trumpeter".

During the battle, the Russian cavalry under Lieutenant-General Rijov, having failed to break through the Thin Red Line to the British base at Balaclava, were repulsed by the uphill advance of the Heavy Cavalry Brigade under Brigadier-General Scarlett, an event later known as the Charge of the Heavy Brigade. It was obvious to an experienced soldier like Morris that the Light Brigade should now attack the Russians in the flank, and he urged this course of action on the brigade commander, Lord Cardigan. Though a major-general, Cardigan had never seen action. He regarded Captain Morris's suggestion as presumption and refused, to Morris's evident frustration.

The enemy cavalry withdrew without further injury, and the Russians now began carrying off the guns they had earlier captured from their positions along the Causeway Heights, a ridge dividing the battlefield along a line from east to west. To prevent this, the British army commander, Lord Raglan, sent an order to the Cavalry Division to "advance rapidly to the front" and "try to prevent the enemy carrying away the guns". The officer sent to deliver the order was Morris's old friend Captain Nolan, who was serving as aide-de-camp to Brigadier-General Airey, and who had shared Morris's frustration at the failure of the Light Brigade to capitalise on the Heavy Brigade's success. On receipt of the order, the commander of the Cavalry Division, Lord Lucan, could not see the guns on the heights from his position on the plain; the only ones in sight were a Russian battery at the eastern end of the valley to the north of the heights. On Lucan's asking "What guns?", Nolan replied "There, my Lord, is your enemy; there are your guns!", and waved in a vaguely eastward direction. Lucan ordered the Light Brigade under Lord Cardigan to advance down the North Valley.

The 17th Lancers under Captain Morris were positioned in the centre of the front line of the Light Brigade, and Captain Nolan joined them there. Nolan gave Morris a letter for his mother, and Morris a letter for his wife to Nolan, to be delivered if the other was killed. As the Brigade began to advance, Nolan said "Now, Morris, for a bit of fun!" As Nolan spurred his horse forward, Morris called out "That won't do, Nolan. We've a long way to go and must be steady." Nolan was then hit by a Russian shell and his horse veered away across the Brigade to the rear. It has been suggested that Nolan, realising that the Brigade was going in the wrong direction, was trying to tell Lord Cardigan the correct objective, but Morris always believed the charge went in the direction Nolan had intended. As the Brigade came under increasing fire, the horses moved from a trot to a canter, and to avoid being overtaken Lord Cardigan, at the front, had to order Morris and the 17th, who were setting the pace, to keep steady. Morris led his regiment down the valley without being injured, and reaching the eastern end, charged past the guns and into the Russian cavalry stationed behind. He killed a Russian officer with his sabre, but the point became stuck in the corpse, leaving Morris vulnerable to attack. He received two sabre cuts to the head, which knocked him from his horse, and then was wounded again by a lance from the Cossacks that surrounded him, after which he surrendered his sword. In the confusion he managed to escape back down the valley, having a captured horse shot under him before continuing on foot, but lost consciousness not far from Nolan's body. He was discovered by Lord Raglan's aide-de-camp Captain Ewart, who called for help removing him. Sergeant Charles Wooden of the 17th and Surgeon James Mouat of the 6th (Inniskilling) Dragoons saved Morris's life by attending to his wounds under Russian fire. For this action the Victoria Cross was later awarded to Mouat and Wooden. Morris was among those listed as "severely wounded" in General Bucknall Estcourt's return and he was mentioned in despatches by Lord Lucan. After recovering from his injuries he was invalided home to England. For his "distinguished service" he was promoted to the brevet rank of major on 12 December 1854.

In February 1855 Morris was appointed Deputy Adjutant General at Horse Guards. He was made a Companion of the Order of the Bath on 5 July 1855 and was also appointed to the fourth class of the Ottoman Order of the Medjidie and the fifth class (Chevalier) of the French Legion of Honour. On 2 November 1855 he was promoted to brevet Lieutenant-Colonel, and went out to Scutari Barracks to oversee remounts for the cavalry. In December 1855 he returned to the Crimea as Deputy Quartermaster-General of the Turkish army at Kerch, with the local rank of colonel, remaining there for the rest of the war. For this he was advanced to the third class of the Medjidie.

== Later service and death ==
After his return to Britain Morris served as Deputy Assistant Adjutant-General at the Curragh in Ireland, until the 17th Lancers were ordered to India in September 1857. Though holding brevet rank as a lieutenant-colonel, Morris still held rank only as a captain in his regiment until he was promoted major, without purchase, on 17 September 1857. He sailed with the 17th to Bombay and was stationed with them at Kirkee. In April 1858 he was appointed Assistant Adjutant-General in Bombay by the Commander-in-Chief Sir Henry Somerset, and took up his post at Mahabaleshwar. Three months later he died at Poona aged 37, "supposedly from the effects of the sun on the silver plate he had in his head as a result of his wounds sustained at Balaclava".

== Monuments ==
- Poona: a memorial tablet to him was set up at St Mary's Church in Poona inscribed:

Sacred to the memory of William Morris of Fishleigh, Devon, Brevet Lieut.-Colonel and Major Her Majesty's 17th Lancers Companion of the Most Honourable Order of the Bath, Knight of the Legion of Honour And Companion of the Third Class of the Imperial Order of the Medjidie, Deputy Assistant Adjutant-General Of Her Majesty's Forces, Bombay, Who departed this life 11th July 1858, at Poona. This tablet is erected by his Brother Officers as a mark of esteem for his character as a friend and a distinguished soldier. Maharajpore . Sobraon . Budiwal . Balaklava . Aliwal . Sebastopol. To them, who by patient continuance in well-doing seek for glory and honour and immortality, eternal life – Romans, ii. Chap. 7 ver.

- Hatherleigh: in 1860 funded by public subscription an obelisk made from ashlar granite was erected near Fishleigh on the north edge of Hatherleigh Moor in Devon, on a site with a spectacular view southwards towards Dartmoor. On its base is a bronze relief sculpture by Edward Bowring Stephens inscribed BALAKLAVA, showing the wounded Morris being carried by three soldiers. The decorative iron gates in front of the monument show the following inscription on two escutcheons:
  This frontage erected 1901 by Sir Robert White-Thomson of Broomfield Manor in memory of his brother John Henry Thomson lieutenant 17th Lancers who fell at Balaklava October 25, 1854 when the regiment was commanded by Captain afterwards Colonel Morris CB
  Sir Robert lived at Broomfield in the same parish of Hatherleigh as Fishleigh, home of Morris, and wrote the latter's biography, published in 1903: A Memoir of Lieutenant-Colonel William Morris.

== Cinematic depiction ==
A fictionalised version of Morris was played by Mark Burns in the 1968 film The Charge of the Light Brigade, with Vanessa Redgrave as his wife (renamed Clarissa in the film) and David Hemmings as his friend Nolan.

== Sources ==
- Adkin, Mark (2004) The Charge: The Real Reason Why the Light Brigade was Lost, Pimlico
