= Elizabeth Courtenay, Countess of Devon =

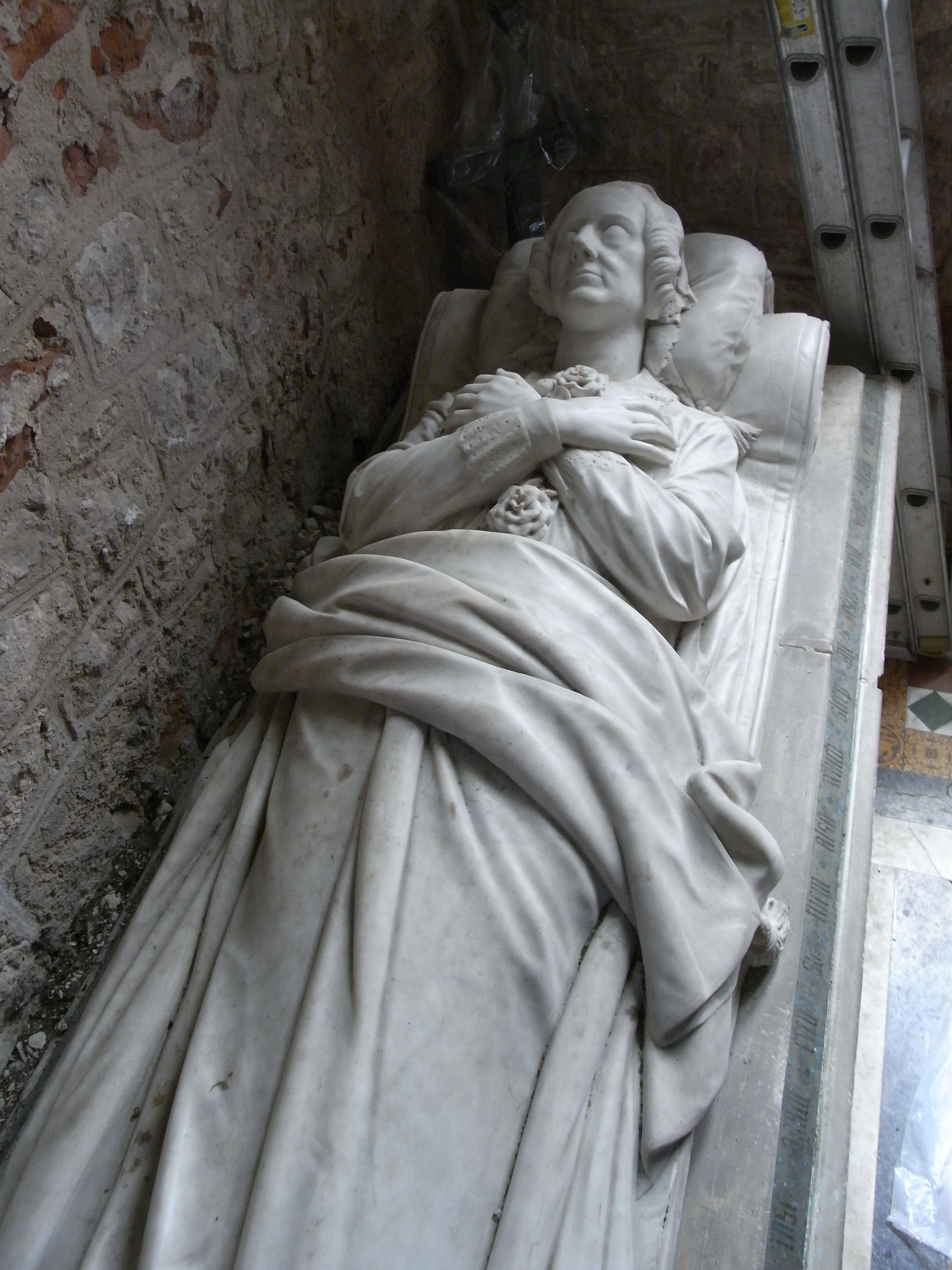
Effigy of Elizabeth, Countess of Devon, by Edward Bowring Stephens, on her tomb in St Clement's Church, Powderham

Elizabeth Courtenay, Countess of Devon (10 July 1801 – 27 January 1867), formerly Lady Elizabeth Fortescue, was the wife of William Courtenay, 11th Earl of Devon, and the mother of the 12th Earl.

Lady Elizabeth was the daughter of Hugh Fortescue, 1st Earl Fortescue, and his wife, the former Hester Grenville. She had three brothers, including Hugh Fortescue, 2nd Earl Fortescue, and five sisters.

Lady Elizabeth married the future earl on 27 December 1830, when he was still an MP and the heir to the earldom. Their children were:

- William Reginald Courtenay (1832–1853), who died unmarried and childless
- Hugh Courtenay (1833–1835), who died in infancy
- Edward Baldwin Courtenay, 12th Earl of Devon (1836–1891), who died unmarried and childless
- Lady Agnes Elizabeth Courtenay (1838–1919), who married Charles Wood, 2nd Viscount Halifax, and had children

In 1859, Courtenay's inherited his father's earldom and his wife became countess. The earl made a number of improvements to the family home of Powderham Castle.

A large granite memorial cross to the countess's eldest son, William, is to be found in the churchyard of St Clement's Church, Powderham, and is inscribed on the west side of the base: "William Reginald Courtenay eldest son of Lord & Lady Courtenay, born Oct 28 1832 died Nov.r 21 1853. In memory of their first born and much beloved child this cross is erected by his sorrowing parents". On the east side is inscribed: "Sorrow not even as others which have no hope for if we believe that Jesus died and rose again even so them also which sleep in Jesus will God bring with him. I Thess. IV 13.14". On the south side is inscribed: "Elizabeth Countess of Devon Died Janr. 27th 1887".

Elizabeth's own tomb, with a full-length recumbent alabaster effigy by Edward Bowring Stephens, is situated inside St Clement's, against the east wall of the south transept.

The earl survived his wife by twenty years, but never remarried.
