= Edward Bowring Stephens =

British sculptor (1815-1882)

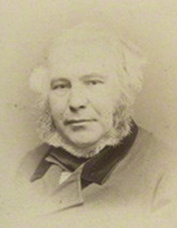
- Edward Bowring Stephens, c.1860s, National Portrait Gallery, London
- Born: 10 December 1815; Exeter, England
- Died: 10 November 1882; London, England
- Known for: Sculpture
- Awards: ARA, Gold Medal RA, 1843, Battle of Centaurs and Lapithae

Edward Bowring Stephens ARA (10 December 1815, in Exeter – 10 November 1882, in London), (works signed E B Stephens) was a British sculptor from Devon. He was honorary secretary of the Institute of Sculptors circa 1861.

== Early life ==
Edward Bowring Stephens was born in Exeter, the son of James Stephens (1777–1849), a statuary mason. His middle name may relate to a familial tie with the prominent Bowring family of Exeter, descended from local wool merchants, a member of which was Sir John Bowring (1792–1872), Governor of Hong Kong, whose marble bust was sculpted by Stephens and is now in the collection of the Devon and Exeter Institution, Exeter.

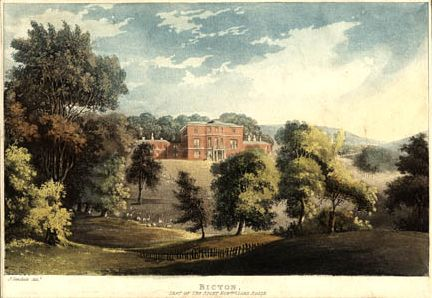
An engraving of a painting by John Gendall, Stephens' early master: "Bicton, seat of the Right Hon'ble Lord Rolle. J. Gendall delt. London, R Ackermann". Engraving, c.1820

Stephens began his artistic training as a pupil of the Exeter-based draughtsman and landscape painter John Gendall (d.1865), who gave classes at his premises at 'Mol's Coffee House'. In 1835, aged 20 he moved to London to become a pupil of the sculptor Edward Hodges Baily (1788–1867). In 1836 he was admitted as a student of the Royal Academy and in 1837 gained a silver medal at the Society of Arts for a small original model of Ajax defying the Gods. His first exhibits were in 1838 at the Royal Academy, of Narcissus, An Arcadian Nymph, Maternal Love, and a bust. The next year he sent for exhibit Diana and another bust. Early in 1839 he travelled to Rome, Italy, where he stayed for three years and gained valuable experience.

== Career ==
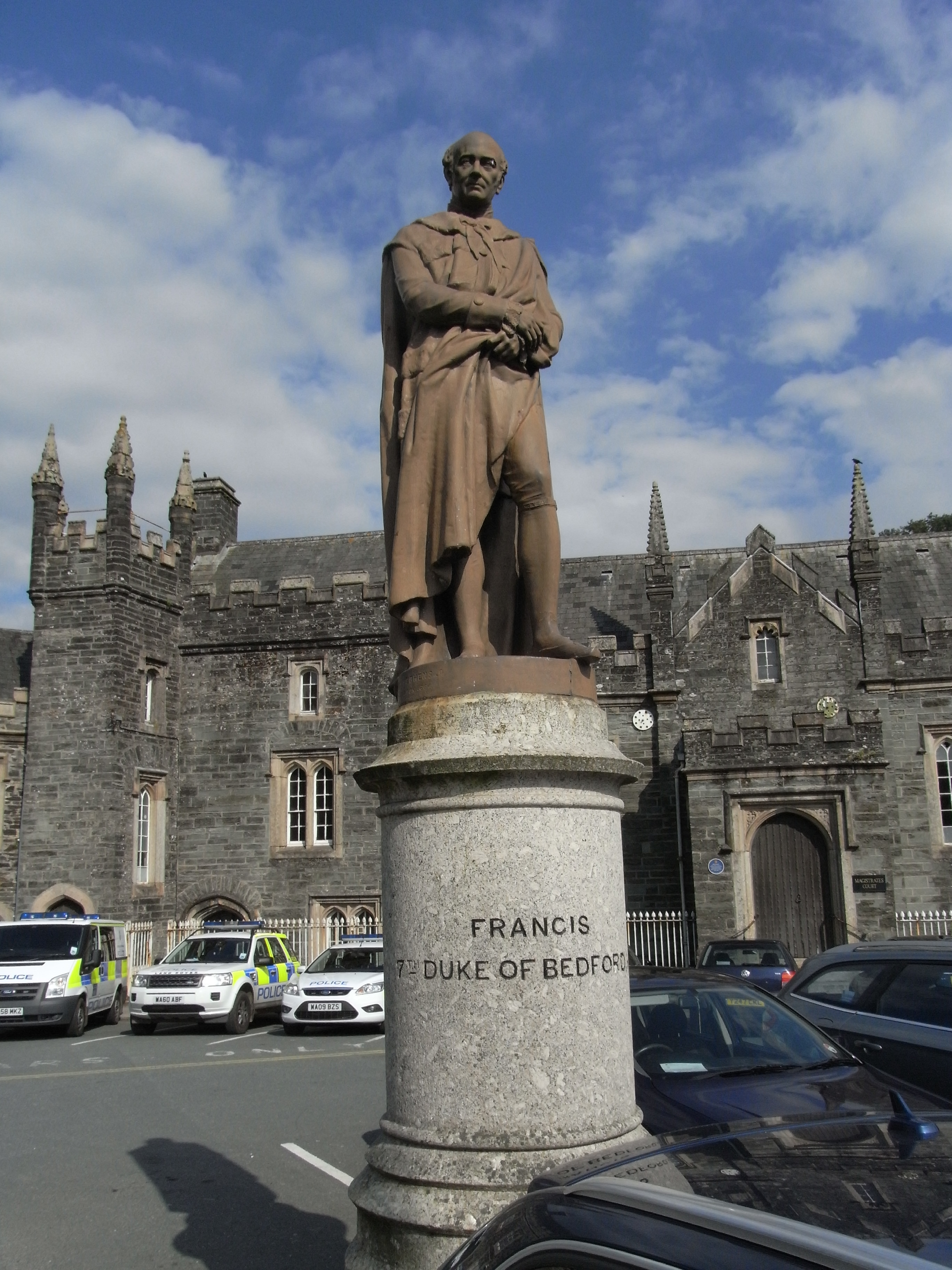
Statue of Francis Russell, 7th Duke of Bedford by E. B. Stephens, before the Magistrate's court, Tavistock. Erected by public subscription, 1864

In about 1842 Stephens returned from Italy to London and in 1843 was awarded the gold medal of the Royal Academy for a small relief work of The Battle of the Centaurs and Lapithæ. At about this time he gained a commission for a life-size statue in marble of John Rolle, 1st Baron Rolle (d.1842), of Bicton House near Exeter. The work is signed "1844", and may therefore have been posthumous. The bust remains on display in Bicton House in 2013. In 1845 he assisted in the decoration of the summer pavilion at Buckingham Palace and sent two of his group sculptures the Great Exhibition of 1851, where they attracted notice: Satan Vanquished and Satan tempting Eve, for a chimneypiece at Buckingham Palace. In 1864 Stephens was elected an associate of the Royal Academy, but possibly in the mistaken belief on the part of the members that he was Alfred Stevens, the sculptor of the Wellington monument in St. Paul's Cathedral, London. He exhibited many works at the Royal Academy, including busts, statues and groups, frequently of contemporary Devon notables.

== Promotes Exeter School of Art ==
Stephens promoted the establishment of the School of Art which opened in Queen Street, Exeter, in 1854. Its transformation into a city museum was the result of a local initiative following the death of Prince Albert in 1861 when in the following year at a public meeting in the Exeter Guildhall chaired by the mayor it was agreed "desirable to erect a memorial in the City of Exeter to His late Royal Highness the Prince Consort". The result was the Royal Albert Memorial Museum, in Queen Street, Exeter, opened in 1868, which incorporated adjuncts for the study of art, science and literature. One of its original curators, who acquired for it many of the early exhibits, was Stephens' old master John Gendall, who however died in 1865 before the opening. In 1862 Stephens offered to the planned museum plastercast copies of any his works they "thought worthy of acceptance". He also offered to execute a memorial statue of the Prince without charge for his labour, the museum committee to pay for the materials only. At the museum's opening the resultant statue was in situ within an aedicule on the landing of the grand staircase, where it remains in 2013. Following the death of John Gendall in 1865, Stephens tried unsuccessfully to raise public funds to purchase for the museum from Gendall's widow his collection of prints and paintings. Following Stephens' death in 1882 the Earl of Devon also tried without success to organise the purchase for the museum of his work The Bathers.

== Marriage ==
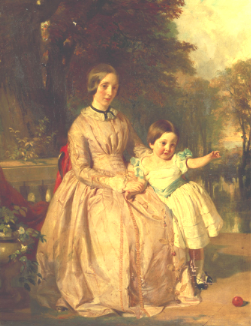
Portrait of Jane Harris Stephens (née Emes), with child, painted by her husband Edward Bowring Stephens (1815–1882)

On 24 July 1845 at Crediton, Devon, Stephens married Jane Harris Emes (b. 1814), the daughter of James Emes, a serge manufacturer of Crediton. She was living in 1871, listed in that year's census with the occupation "Sculptor's Wife". His London address was Cirencester Place, Fitzroy Square, then 1a Hampstead Street, Fitzroy Square and finally 110 Buckingham Palace Road, Pimlico.

== Death ==
He died at his London home, 110 Buckingham Palace Road, on 10 Nov. 1882. His final exhibit at the Royal Academy was shown posthumously in 1883.

== Works ==
=== Busts ===
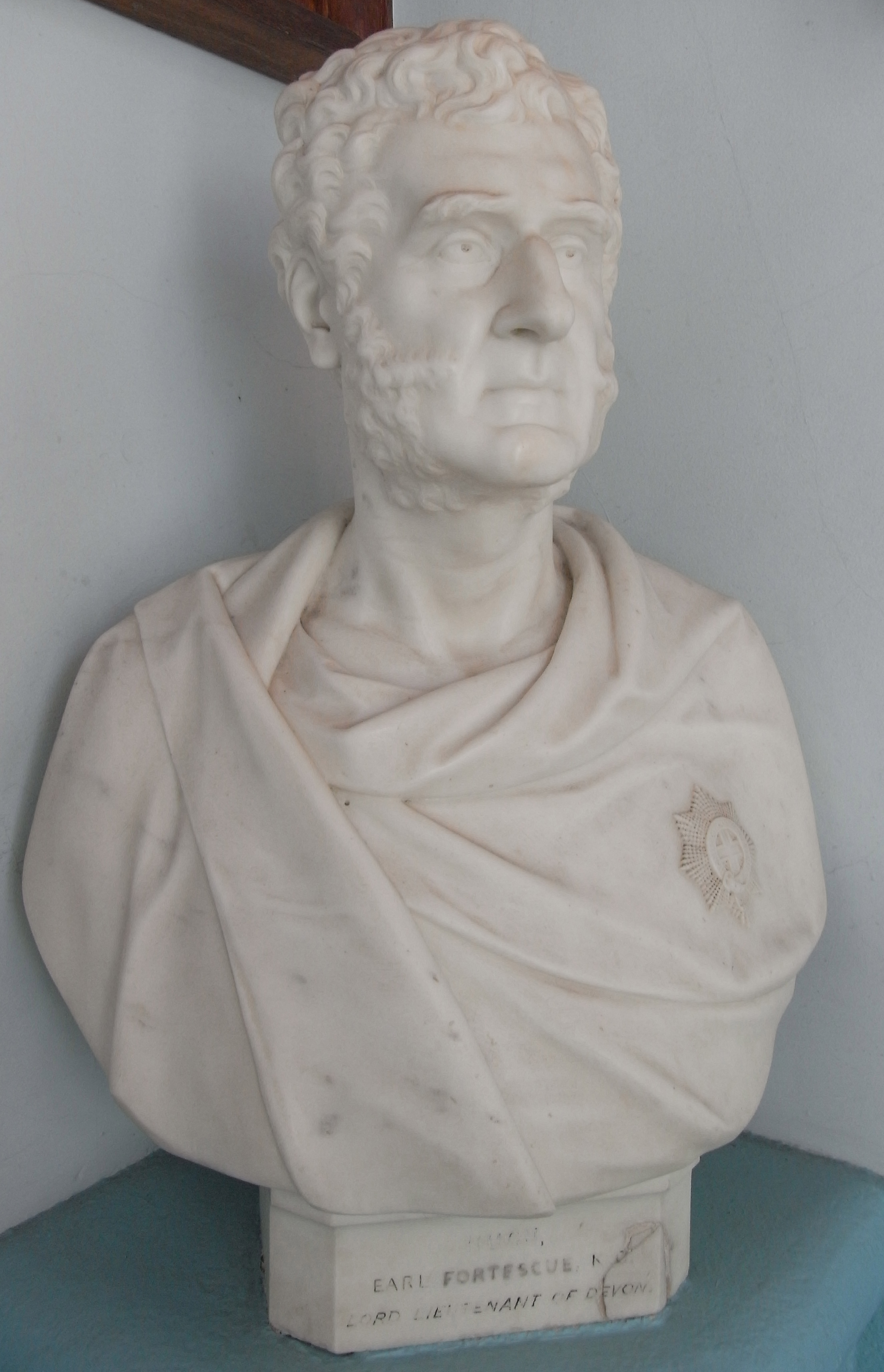
"Hugh, Earl Fortescue KG, Lord Lieutenant of Devon", Marble bust by Edward Bowring Stephens, 1861; Memorial Hall, West Buckland School, Devon

The subjects of his busts included: Lord Palmerston, Sir Thomas Dyke Acland, 10th Baronet Henry Phillpotts, Bishop of Exeter, William Courtenay, 11th Earl of Devon (at Powderham Castle), Hugh Fortescue, 2nd Earl Fortescue and Rev. Joseph Lloyd Brereton (both at West Buckland School, Devon, which they co-founded), Viscount Ebrington (son of Earl Fortescue), Richard Somers Gard, donor of the site of the Albert Memorial Museum, Exeter, where the work remains; Sir William Webb Follett, MP, (1842) and Sir John Bowring, Governor of Hong Kong, (Devon and Exeter Institution, Exeter); William Lowther, 2nd Earl of Lonsdale (1872) at one time at Lowther Castle now at Hughenden Manor, Buckinghamshire (National Trust); James Viney, Esq.; P. Miller, Esq., MD; The Dean of Exeter; General Gage John Hall (1832-1854); W.S. Kelsall, Esq.

=== Monumental statues in Devon ===
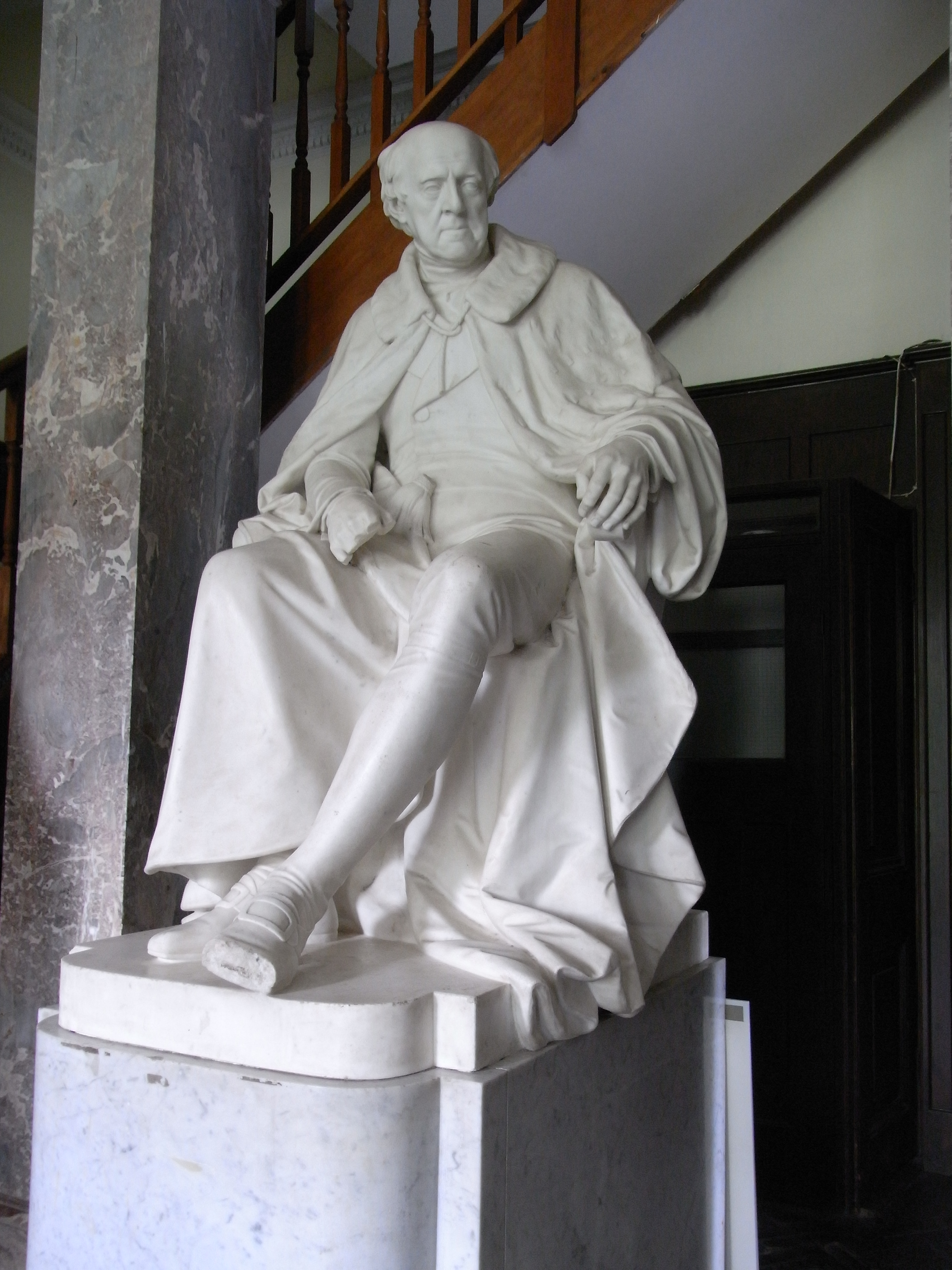
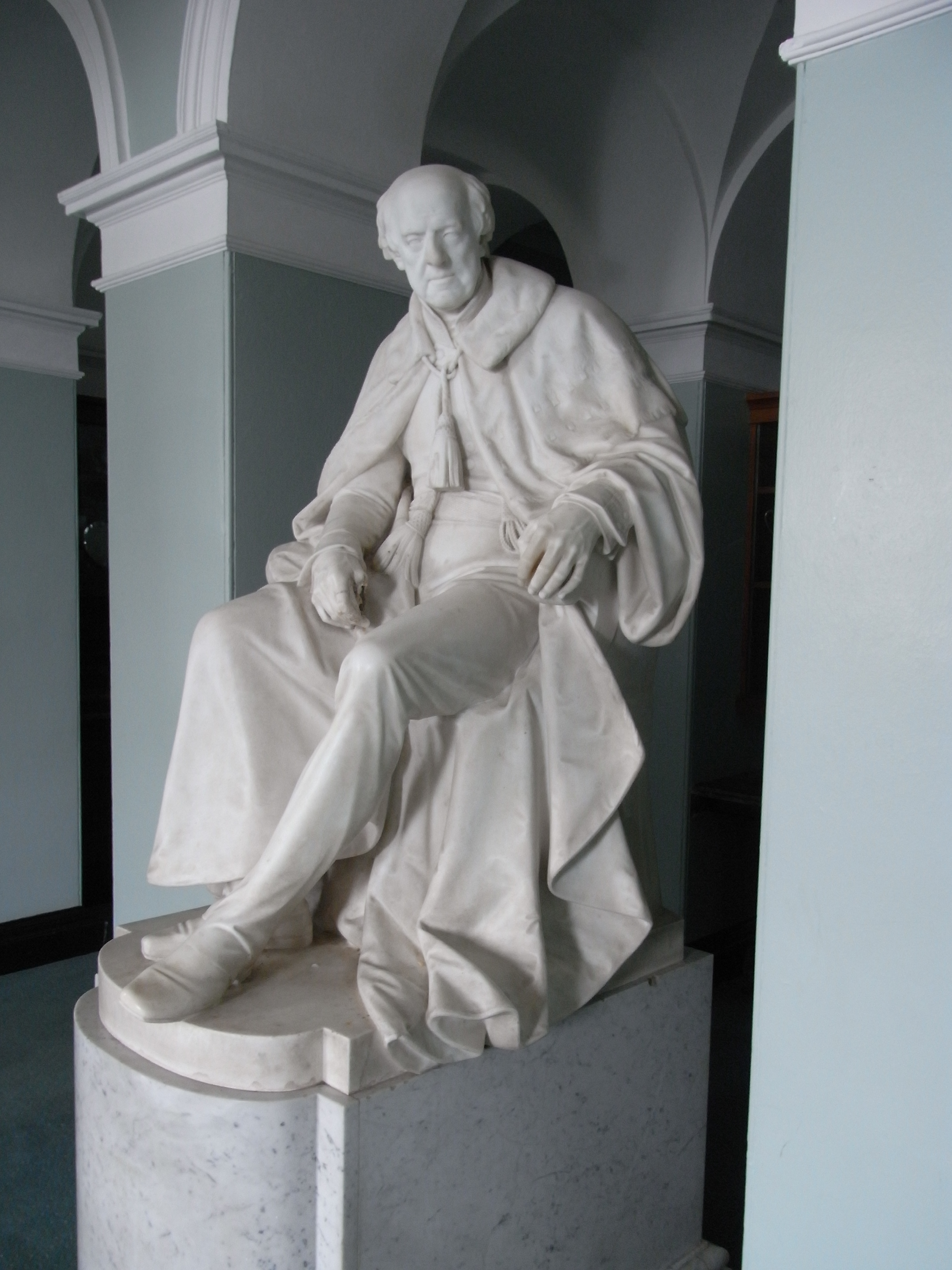
Two nearly identical statues by Stephens of John Rolle, 1st Baron Rolle (d.1842): left: dated 1843 in entrance hall of Lupton House, Brixham, the home of John Yarde-Buller, 1st Baron Churston (1799-1871) and right dated 1844 in entrance hall of Bicton House, Lord Rolle's principal seat. One of these was exhibited at the Royal Academy as: "A marble statue of the late Lord Rolle in the robe worn at the coronation of Her Majesty the Queen"

One of his earliest works were the two identical life-size seated statues in white marble of John Rolle, 1st Baron Rolle (d.1842), one dated 1843 at Lupton House, Brixham, the other dated 1844 at Bicton House, Lord Rolle's seat. Many of his life-size standing statues were made to adorn the streets of his native city of Exeter. These included Sir Thomas Dyke Acland, 10th Baronet (1862), now in Northernhay Gardens, beneath the castle walls; Hugh Fortescue, 2nd Earl Fortescue (1863), erected in the centre of the Castle Yard of Exeter Castle, since removed to the grass verge; William Courtenay, 11th Earl of Devon (1880/81) originally in Bedford Circus, since moved to Northernhay Gardens, whose deceased wife Elizabeth Fortescue he also sculpted as a recumbent effigy in Powderham parish church, with a plaster-cast in the chapel at Powderham Castle, Devon. Prince Albert (1868) in the Royal Albert Memorial Museum, Exeter; John Dinham (1866), a local philanthropist, a seated marble figure, also in Northernhay Gardens. Statues situated elsewhere include Francis Russell, 7th Duke of Bedford at Tavistock, Devon; Alfred Rooker in Guildhall Square, Plymouth, Devon;

=== Monumental statues outside Devon ===
His works located outside the county of Devon include: three standing statues included in those ornamenting the facade of Burlington House, London, home of the Royal Academy: Sir Joshua Reynolds, Leonardo da Vinci and Sir Christopher Wren; General Lord Saltoun at Fraserburgh, Scotland; Sir John Cordy Burrows (1878), mayor of Brighton, at Brighton, Sussex; Alfred the Great propounding his code of laws, for the Egyptian Hall of the Mansion House, London, exhibited in Westminster Hall in 1844; Another in the Mansion House of Alfred the Great in the Neatherd's Cottage, commissioned in 1861, exhibited 1863 at the Royal Academy; Seated marble figure of William Lowther, 2nd Earl of Lonsdale (1863), in the chapel on the upper floor of the Lowther Mausoleum in Lowther Churchyard, Cumbria. Joseph Priestley, Natural History Museum, Oxford, one of many figures against the pillars on the ground floor;

=== Imaginary or literary subjects ===
His other works exhibited included: Satan tempting Eve and Satan Vanquished (c.1845), a double group for a chimney piece in Buckingham Palace; Eve contemplating Death (1853); The Angel, and Evening: Going to the Bath (1861); Euphrosyne and Cupid (1865); Cupid's Cruise (1867); Blackberry Picking: the Thorn (1870); Zingari (1871); Eve's Dream (1873); The Bathers (1877); statuettes of Ophelia (1879) and Lady Godiva (1879); and Shielding the Helpless (1883); Hagar and Ishmael in the wilderness;

==== The "Deer stalker" ====
His life-size group in bronze of The "Deer stalker", a crouching semi-nude male figure with a hound, is considered his finest work. It now stands at the entrance of Northernhay Gardens, Exeter. It was made in 1875, exhibited at the Royal Academy in 1876, and was purchased by public subscription for display in Bedford Circus, Exeter, where it was unveiled on 30 August 1878, on a granite plinth surrounded by decorative iron railings made by Garton and King. However, it did not remain there long and after a proposed move in 1800 to London Inn Square was rejected its new home was decided on as Northernhay Gardens, below the walls of Exeter Castle, where it was unveiled on 8 October 1880 and where it remains today, without railings. Its place in Bedford Circus was taken by Stephens' statue of William Courtenay, 11th Earl of Devon, which too was later moved to Northernhay Gardens. Stephens produced two other versions of The "Deers talker": a small bronze signed and dated "E B Stephens ARA, 1878" and inscribed by the foundry "J L Thomas & Co, Exeter", measuring 30.5 cm by 31 cm (12" by 12 1/4"), exhibited in 1876 as no.1435. This was sold at Sotheby's, London on 2 November 2001, lot 249, and a marble figure exhibited in 1873 as no.1504.

The Deer Stalker

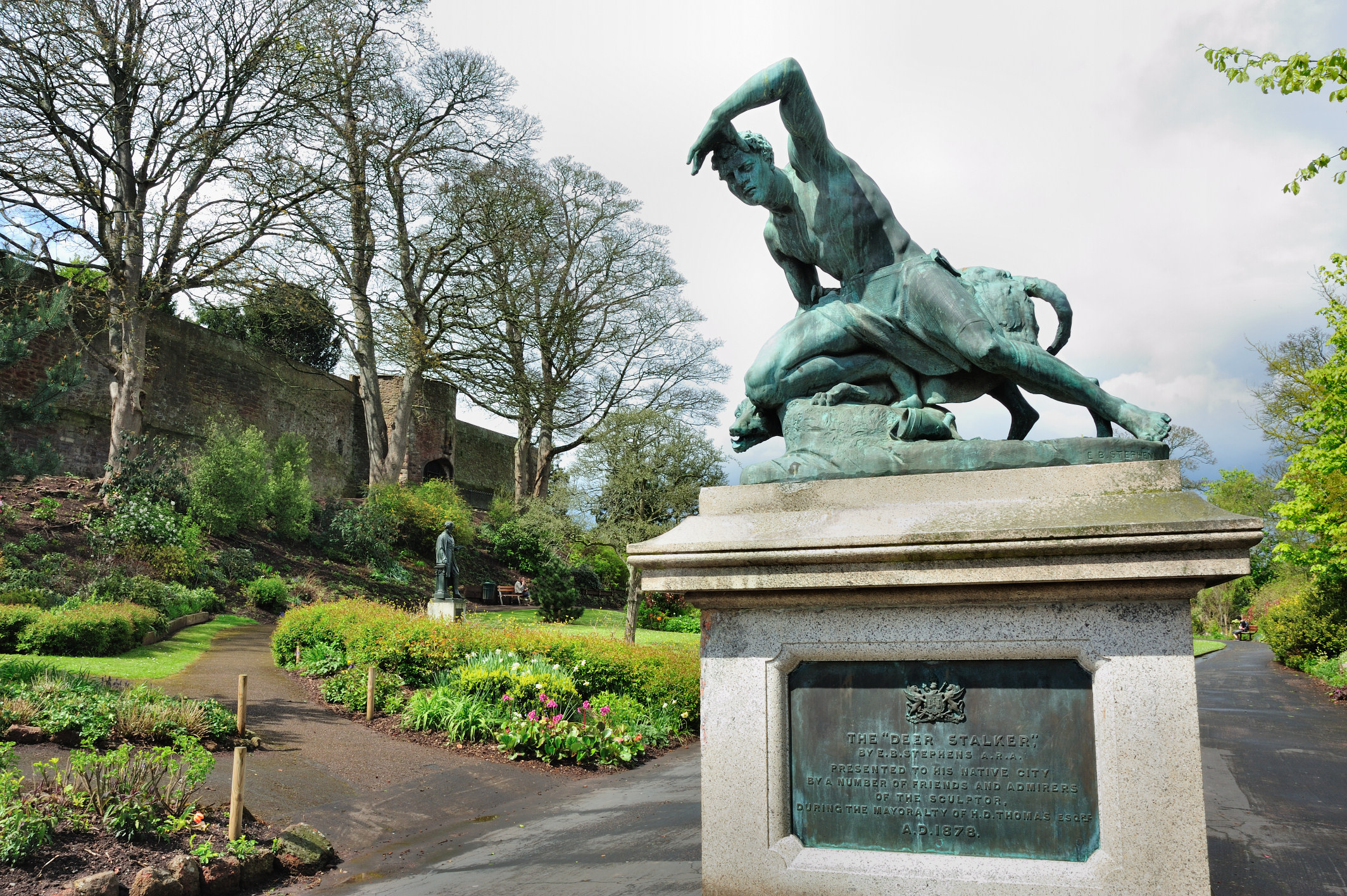
E. B. Stephens' statue The "Deer Stalker", Northernhay Gardens, Exeter. In the left background is Stephens' statue of William Courtenay, 11th Earl of Devon

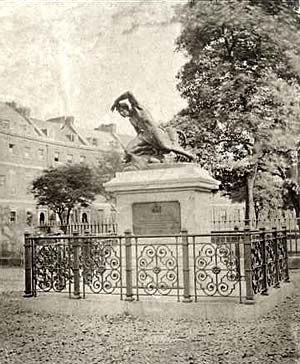
The "Deer stalker" photographed between 1878 and 1880 in its original place in Bedford Circus, Exeter, the Georgian architectural masterpiece demolished after World War II

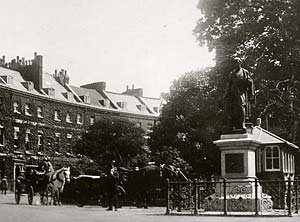
Statue of William Courtenay, 11th Earl of Devon, by Edward Bowring Stephens, in Bedford Circus, Exeter, where it stood from its unveiling in 1880 (having replaced Stephens' The "Deer stalker") to after 1942 when it escaped World War II bombing and was placed in storage. It stands in 2013 in Northernhay Gardens, Exeter.

== Other works in Devon ==
The following works of Stephens exist as follows:

- Monument to Edward Kenyon (d.1843), St Mary's Church, Aylesbeare
- Mural monument to Jane Spence (d.1815), St Peter's Church, Berrynarbor, by Stephens of Exeter, possibly his father
- William the Conqueror, Exeter Cathedral, west front
- St James the Less, Exeter Cathedral, west front
- Mural brass to Rev. Thomas Putt (d.1844), Gittisham
- Minor wall monuments, Great Torrington Church
- The Good Samaritan, relief, Sandford
- Cartouche/tablet, Tawstock
- William Morris bronze relief panel (1860), inscribed BALAKLAVA, on base of memorial obelisk, Hatherleigh Moor, in Devon, funded by public subscription. Depicts the wounded hero of the Charge of the Light Brigade being carried by three soldiers.
- Monument to Rev. Richard Lewis (d.1843), St Paul's Church, Honiton
- Raising of the Widow's Son (1868), large relief, chancel of All Saints' Church, Kenton
- Monument to Capt. John Newcombe (d.1855) St Andrew's Church, Moretonhampstead
