= Charles Wooden =

Recipient of the Victoria Cross

- Born: 24 March 1829; Germany
- Died: 24 April 1876 (aged 47); Dover, Kent
- Burial place: St James's Cemetery, Dover
- Military career
- Allegiance: United Kingdom
- Branch: British Army
- Service years: 1846–1876
- Rank: Lieutenant
- Units: 17th Lancers; 6th Dragoons; 5th Lancers; 104th Regiment of Foot (Bengal Fusiliers)
- Conflicts: Crimean War: Battle of Balaklava; Indian Mutiny
- Awards: Victoria Cross; Médaille militaire (France)

Charles Wooden VC (24 March 1829 – 24 April 1876) was a German-born soldier in the British Army and a recipient of the Victoria Cross, the highest award for gallantry in the face of the enemy that can be awarded to British and Commonwealth forces.

== Crimean War ==
He was awarded the Victoria Cross for acts of gallantry during the Crimean War. He was 25 years old, and a sergeant-major in the 17th Lancers (Duke of Cambridge's Own), British Army. On 26 October 1854, in the Crimea, at Balaklava, Sergeant-Major Wooden went out with surgeon James Mouat to the assistance of an officer who was lying seriously wounded in an exposed position, after the retreat of the Light Cavalry. He helped to dress the officer's wounds under heavy fire from the enemy.

Lord Raglan wishes the cavalry to advance rapidly to the front, follow the enemy, and try to prevent the enemy carrying away the guns. Troop Horse Artillery may accompany. French cavalry is on your left. Immediate. (signed) R. Airey

This order, carried by the young Captain Louis Nolan and misinterpreted by Lord Lucan, began one of the most famous of all military engagements – The Charge of the Light Brigade – on 25 October 1854. Charles Wooden rode in this action.

Captain William Morris of the 17th Lancers, with about 20 men as yet comparatively unscathed in the sea of carnage all around, came upon a squadron of Russian Hussars. Ordering his men to keep together, he rode straight at the Russian leader, running him through with his sword with such force that he toppled him over the side of his horse, and, unable to disengage his hand from his sword, fell with him. The Russians closed on Morris and slashed at him with their sabres, cutting through his forage cap until he lost consciousness. He was taken prisoner but, in the confusion of the field, managed to slip away, capture a horse and make a dash for freedom, only to fall from his horse due to his wounds. Pursued by the Russians through the thick smoke of the battlefield, he caught another horse, but fell again when the horse was shot. This time the horse fell on him, trapping his leg. When he came to, in agony from a broken right arm, broken ribs and three deep head wounds, he managed to free his leg and stagger towards the British lines. By a strange coincidence he came across the body of his good friend Captain Nolan; and lay down beside it. (Morris and Nolan had earlier exchanged the letters customary between friends before battle, promising to inform the other's loved ones should anything happen to them.) Once again, Morris lapsed into unconsciousness.

An attempt was made by Turkish troops to recover the two men; but, as Russian fire rained down upon them, they abandoned it. A message was then sent to the 17th Lancers; and Sergeant-Major Charles Wooden of the 17th Lancers (who had ridden in the charge, and had had his horse shot from under him) and Surgeon Mouat of the 6th Dragoons, set out under heavy fire to rescue the stricken Morris. After roughly dressing his wounds, they succeeded in returning to their lines. For this action both were to be awarded Britain's highest military honour, the Victoria Cross. Morris survived his wounds, and died four years later in India.

Sergeant-Major Wooden was something of a character in the 17th Lancers. One night, returning to camp the worse for wear after a drinking session, he was challenged by the sentry on guard duty, but could not remember the password. "'tish me", Wooden whispered in a slurred voice. "Who?" asked the sentry. "'tish me, 'tish me!" came the answer. Down came the sentry's lance as he demanded to know just which 'me' it was.

By now in a temper, Wooden bellowed: "'tish me, the Devil". The sentry, now exercising his better judgement on recognising his Sergeant-Major retorted: "Pass, 'tish me the Devil!" From that moment the nickname stuck and for the remainder of his service with the 'Death or Glory Boys', Wooden remained "Tish me the Devil".

Wooden, a German by birth, was not a popular man in the regiment possibly because of his odd demeanour and strong German accent. Even the award of his VC was controversial. At first he was not entered for the award although Dr Mouat was. Wooden wrote to Dr Mouat saying that if Mouat was to receive a VC then so should he as he had been at Mouat's side during the rescue of Lt Col Morris. Dr Mouat agreed, and wrote to the Horse Guards supporting Wooden's claim.

The reply to his letter reads: "His Royal Highness feels very unwilling to bring any further claim for the Victoria Cross for an act performed at so distant a period but as the decoration has been conferred on Dr James Mouat for the part he took in the rescue of Lt. Col. Morris and Sergeant-Major Wooden appears to have acted in a manner very honourable to him on the occasion and, by his gallantry, been equally instrumental in saving the life of this officer, His Royal Highness is induced to submit the case." Wooden's VC was gazetted on 26 October 1858.

His VC citation reads:

HER Majesty has also been graciously pleased to confer the Decoration of the Victoria Cross on the undermentioned Non-commissioned Officer of Her Majesty's Army, who has been recommended to Her Majesty for that Decoration, on account of an Act of Bravery performed by him in the Crimea, during the late War, as recorded against his name; viz.:

17th Lancers, Serjeant-Major Charles Wooden

Date of Act of Bravery, 26th October 1854

For having, after the retreat of The Light Cavalry, at the Battle of Balaclava, been instrumental, together with Dr James Mouat CB, in saving the life of Lieutenant Colonel Morris CB, of the 17th Lancers by proceeding under a heavy fire to his assistance, when he was lying very dangerously wounded in an exposed situation.

— London Gazette, 26 October 1858.

Wooden's other medal entitlements are the Crimea Medal (with bars Alma, Balaclava, Inkerman and Sebastopol), Turkish Medal, French War Medal and the Indian Mutiny Medal.

== Later service ==
He exchanged into the 6th Dragoons to become Quartermaster there (presumably with promotion to the rank of officer) in 1860, exchanged into the 5th Lancers in 1865, retired on half-pay in 1871, and was appointed Quartermaster of the 104th Regiment of Foot (Bengal Fusiliers) in 1872.

On 14 April 1876 Wooden shot himself following a drinking session, having complained of severe head pains the previous week. An inquest recorded death by suicide due to temporary insanity. He was 47 years old and had served 30 years with the army. He is buried in St James's Cemetery, Dover.

== The Medal ==
His VC is on display in The Royal Lancers and Nottinghamshire Yeomanry Museum in Thoresby Park, Nottinghamshire.

== Bibliography ==
- Ingleton, Roy (2011). Kent VCs. Pen and Sword Books. ISBN 978-1848844094.
