= James Mouat =

Sir James Mouat VC KCB FRCS
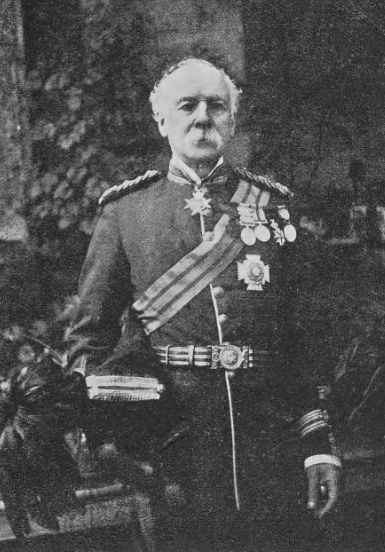
- Born: 14 April 1815; Chatham, Kent
- Died: 4 January 1899 (aged 83); Kensington, London
- Burial place: Kensal Green Cemetery, London
- Military career
- Allegiance: United Kingdom
- Branch: British Army
- Rank: Surgeon General
- Units: 44th Regiment of Foot; 4th Regiment of Foot; 9th Regiment of Foot; 6th (Inniskilling) Dragoons
- Conflicts: Crimean War; New Zealand Wars
- Awards: Victoria Cross; Knight Commander of the Order of the Bath, 1894; Companion of the Order of the Bath; Crimea Medal with Balaklava, Inkerman, Sebastopol clasps New Zealand War Medal; Golden Jubilee Medal, 1887; Légion d'Honneur (France); Turkish Crimea Medal

Surgeon General Sir James Mouat VC KCB FRCS (14 April 1815 – 4 January 1899) was an English recipient of the Victoria Cross (VC), the highest and most prestigious award for gallantry in the face of the enemy that can be awarded to British and Commonwealth forces.

Mouat was born in Chatham, Kent on 14 Apr 1815, the son of Surgeon James Mouat, 25th Dragoons. After medical training at University College Hospital London, Mouat was appointed Assistant Surgeon of the 44th Regimentin 1838. In 1854 he became Surgeon of the 6th (Inniskilling) Dragoons, moving to the Crimea the same year on the outbreak of the Crimean War.

== Details ==
Mouat was 39 years old, and a Surgeon in the 6th (Inniskilling) Dragoons, British Army, during the Crimean War when the following deed took place on 26 October 1854 in the Crimea, at Balaklava, for which he was awarded the VC.

Surgeon Mouat went with Corporal Charles Wooden to the assistance of an officer who was lying seriously wounded in an exposed position, after the retreat of the Light Cavalry. He dressed the officer's wounds under heavy fire from the enemy, and by stopping a severe haemorrhage, helped to save his life.

His citation reads:

War-Office, 2 June 1858.

THE Queen has been graciously pleased to signify Her intention to confer the Decoration of the Victoria Cross on the undermentioned Officers and Non-Commissioned Officers of Her Majesty's Army, who have been recommended to Her Majesty for that Decoration, in accordance with the rules laid down in Her Majesty's Warrant of 29 January 1856, on account of Acts of Bravery performed by them in the Crimea during the late War, as recorded against their several names; viz.:

[...]

Late of 6th Dragoons, Surgeon James Mouat, C.B., (now Deputy-Inspector-General of Hospitals)

Date of Act of Bravery, 26 October 1854

For having voluntarily proceeded to the assistance of Lieutenant-Colonel Morris, C.B., 17th Lancers, who was lying dangerously wounded in an exposed situation after the retreat of the Light Cavalry at the battle of Balaklava, and having dressed that officer's wounds in presence of, and under a heavy fire from the enemy. Thus, by stopping a serious hemorrhage [sic], he assisted in saving that officer's life.

== Later career ==
Mouat returned home in 1856 before going to New Zealand in 1860 as the Army Principal Medical Officer, serving in the Maori Wars between 1860–61 and 1863-65. Mouat was soon critical of the campaign, commenting in 1861 that the war was "unholy and unjust, instigated by the settlers to rob the natives of their land". In spite of this, the New Zealand government voted Mouat "special thanks for his valuable services to the Colony".

After service in Britain as a surgeon general, he retired from the Army in 1876. In 1888 he was appointed an Honorary Surgeon to Queen Victoria.

== The medal ==
His Victoria Cross is displayed at the Army Medical Services Museum in Mytchett, Surrey.

== Family ==
In 1859 Mouat married Adela-Rose-Ellen, daughter of Rev Nicholas Tindal, rector of Sandhurst, Gloucestershire, and granddaughter of Sir Nicolas Conyngham Tindal, Chief Justice of the Common Pleas from 1829 to 1845.
