= Sir John Duckworth, 2nd Baronet =

British politician

Sir John Duckworth Bt
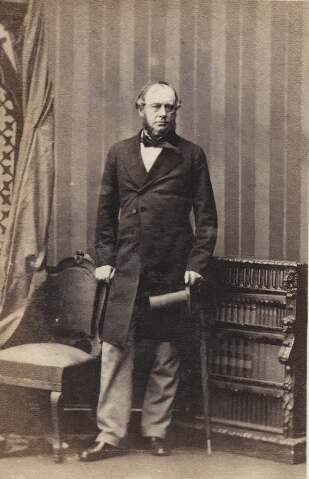
- Sir John Duckworth, 1861 photograph

Member of Parliament for Exeter
- In office 7 July 1845 – 27 March 1857 Serving with Edward Divett
- Preceded by: William Webb Follett; Edward Divett
- Succeeded by: Richard Gard; Edward Divett

Personal details
- Born: 17 March 1809
- Died: 29 November 1887 (aged 78)
- Party: Conservative
- Spouse: Mary Isabella Buller (m. 1850)
- Children: Three daughters
- Parent(s): John Duckworth; Susanna Catherine Buller

Sir John Thomas Buller Duckworth, 2nd Baronet (17 March 1809 – 29 November 1887) was a British Conservative politician.

== Life ==
He was the son of his namesake John Duckworth and Susanna Catherine Buller. He was educated at Eton College, and matriculated at Oriel College, Oxford in 1826, graduating B.A. in 1829. He inherited the baronetcy of Topsham in 1817 on the death of his father.

Duckworth was elected Conservative MP for Exeter at a by-election in 1845—caused by the death of William Webb Follett—and held the seat until 1857 when he did not seek re-election at that year's general election.

== Family ==
Duckworth married Mary Isabella Buller, daughter of John and Harriet Buller, in 1850, and they had three children: Mary Georgiana (born 1852); Evelyn Harriet (born 1857); and, Fanny Catherine (born 1860).

Parliament of the United Kingdom
Preceded by William Webb Follett; Edward Divett	Member of Parliament for Exeter; 1845–1857; With: Edward Divett	Succeeded by Richard Gard; Edward Divett
Baronetage of the United Kingdom
Preceded by John Duckworth	Baronet (of Topsham); 1817–1887	Extinct
