= Devon and Exeter Institution =

Library in Exeter, England

Coordinates: 50.7231°N 3.5293°W

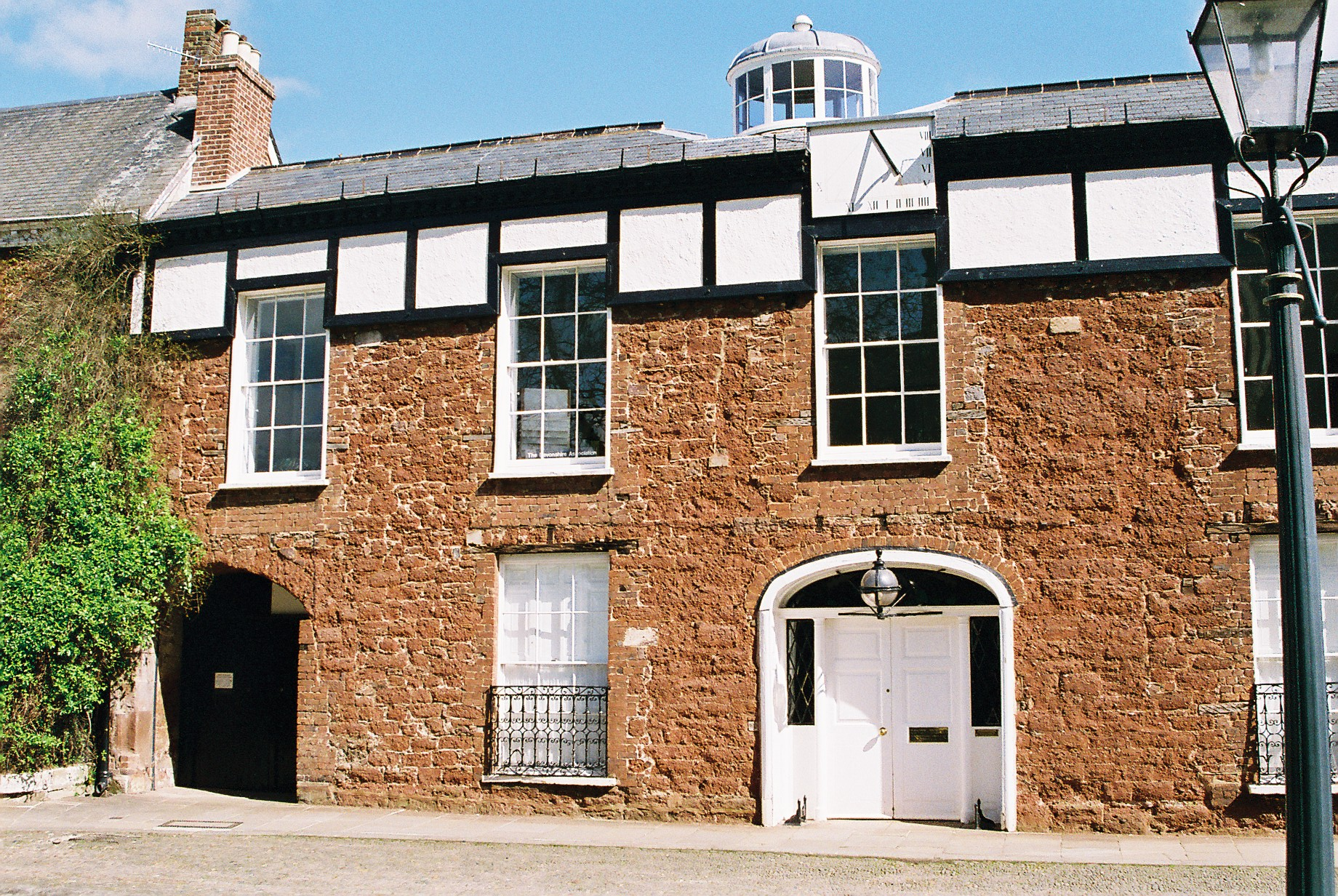
Devon and Exeter Institution, 7 Cathedral Close, Exeter

The Devon and Exeter Institution is a subscription library in the City of Exeter, in Devon, United Kingdom, founded in 1813 for "The general diffusion of science, literature and the arts". It is situated at 7, Cathedral Close, Exeter, in a building facing the north side of Exeter Cathedral which was formerly the Exeter townhouse of the Courtenay family of Powderham Castle.

== Membership ==
Membership is by annual subscription, although current students and staff of Exeter University may use it free of charge.

== Library ==
The library houses two marble busts by the sculptor Edward Bowring Stephens (1815–1882) of Exeter, of Sir William Webb Follett (1796–1845), MP for Exeter and Sir John Bowring (1792–1872), of Exeter, Governor of Hong Kong and President of the Devon and Exeter Institution 1860–61.

The library's collection consists of approximately 40,000 printed books in addition to prints, documents, drawings, art and a small number of artefacts.

== List of presidents ==
- Richard Ford, 1855
- Sir John Bowring, 1860–1861

== History of building ==
The idea for an institution combining a library, reading room, county museum and venue for public lectures was conceived by William Elford Leach, a young naturalist from Plymouth. Leach approached the Mayor of Exeter with his proposal in June 1812, and fundraising began shortly after. The Institution's aims were agreed in a meeting on 12 August 1813. Membership required the purchase of a £25 share and an annual subscription of £1, limiting its initial membership to affluent, educated gentlemen.

The building in which the Institution is housed at 7, Cathedral Close, was purchased from the Dean and Chapter of Exeter Cathedral and was formerly the Exeter townhouse of the Civil War Roundhead General Sir William Waller (c.1597–1668) of Forde, Wolborough, Devon. Following the death of his son, his eventual heiress was his daughter Margaret Waller (d.1694), who married Sir William Courtenay, 1st Baronet (1628–1702), of Powderham, Devon, to which family she brought the Waller estates including the Exeter townhouse. Her descendants became Viscounts Courtenay and Earls of Devon.

=== Courtenay overmantel ===
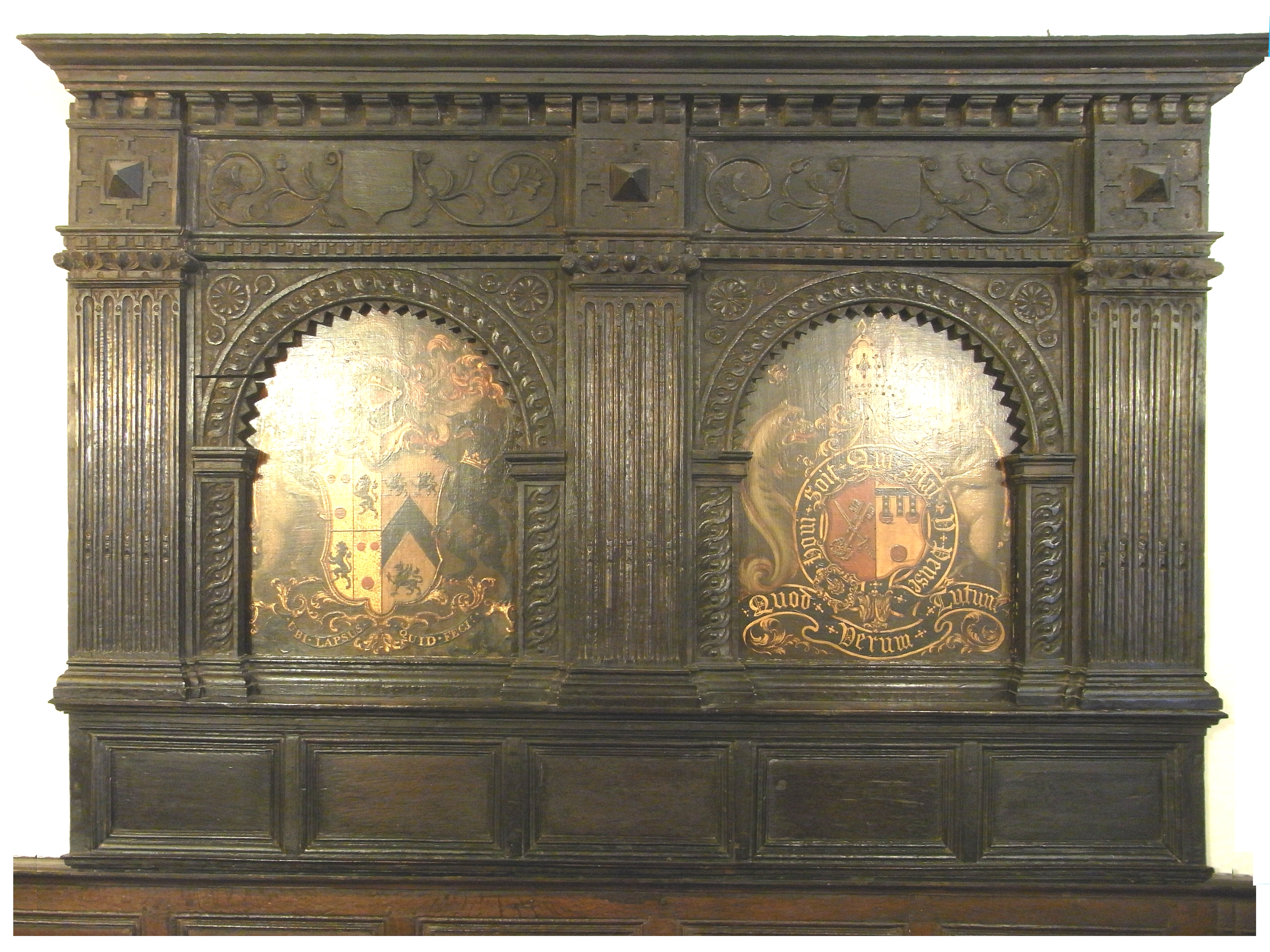
Courtenay heraldic overmantel, c.1750, in 7 Cathedral Close

An heraldic overmantel of c.1750, survives in a back room of 7 Cathedral Close. The left hand painted panel shows the arms of William Courtenay, 1st Viscount Courtenay (1711–1762): Quarterly 1st & 4th: Or, three torteaux (Courtenay); 2 & 3: Or, a lion rampant azure (de Redvers, Earl of Devon) impaling Argent, a chevron between three griffins passant sable, the arms of Finch, Earl of Aylesford, the family of his wife. The sinister supporter is one of the Finch heraldic griffins, the dexter one is the Courtenay boar. The Courtenay Latin motto is shown underneath: Ubi lapsus quid feci ("Where did I slip what have I done"). The panel on the right shows the arms of Bishop Peter Courtenay (1432–1492), Bishop of Exeter and Winchester, of the Powderham family. His arms (Courtenay, with a label of three points azure each point of the label charged with three plates for difference) are impaled by the arms of the See of Winchester, which are very similar to the arms of the See of Exeter. The whole is circumscribed by the Garter. The supporters are: dexter, the Courtenay dolphin, sinister, the Courtenay boar. The motto beneath is: Quod verum tutum ("What is true is safe").

== Sources ==
- Devon and Exeter Institution website
- Devon and Exeter Institution Library and Reading Rooms, leaflet available on site
- Pevsner, Nikolaus & Cherry, Bridget, Buildings of England: Devon, London, 2004, p. 413
- Cox, Jo; Thorp, John R. L. (2021). Conservation Management Plan for the Devon and Exeter Institution (Report). Exeter: Keystone Historic Buildings Consultants. K944.
