= Edward Divett =

British Liberal MP (1797-1864)

Member of Parliament for Exeter
- In office 12 December 1832 – 25 July 1864 Serving with Richard Gard (1857–1864); John Duckworth (1845–1857); William Webb Follett (1835–1845); James Wentworth Buller (1832–1835)
- Preceded by: James Wentworth Buller; Lewis William Buck
- Succeeded by: Richard Gard; Edward Courtenay

Personal details
- Born: 1797
- Died: 25 July 1864 (aged 66–67)
- Party: Liberal
- Other political affiliations: Radical

Edward Divett (1797 – 25 July 1864) was a British Liberal and Radical politician.

Divett was elected Radical MP for Exeter at the 1832 general election and held the seat until his death in 1864. His victory in the seat was due in part to the political reforms brought to Exeter by the Reform Act of 1832.

Parliament of the United Kingdom
Preceded by James Wentworth Buller; Lewis William Buck	Member of Parliament for Exeter; 1832–1864; With: Richard Gard (1857–1864); John Duckworth (1845–1857); William Webb Follett (1835–1845); James Wentworth Buller (1832–1835)	Succeeded by Richard Gard; Edward Courtenay
