= Duckworth baronets of Topsham (1813) =

The Duckworth baronetcy, of Topsham in the County of Devon, was created in the Baronetage of the United Kingdom on 2 November 1813 for the naval commander John Thomas Duckworth. The 2nd Baronet sat as Member of Parliament for Exeter from 1845 to 1857. The title became extinct on his death in 1887.

== Duckworth baronets, of Topsham (1813) ==
- Sir John Thomas Duckworth, 1st Baronet (died 1817)
- Sir John Thomas Buller Duckworth, 2nd Baronet (1809–1887)

== Notes ==
Baronetage of the United Kingdom
Preceded by Broke-Middleton baronets	Duckworth baronets of Topsham; 2 November 1813	Succeeded by Henniker baronets
