= James Wentworth Buller =

British politician

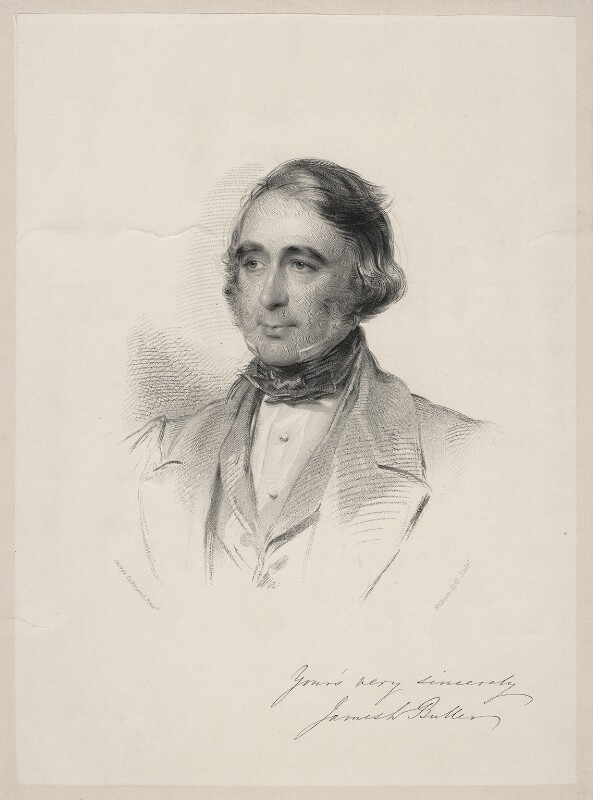
- James Wentworth Buller, 1847 drawing

Member of the Great Britain Parliament for Exeter
- In office 1830–1835 Serving with Lewis William Buck (Note: Served from 1830-1832); Edward Divett (Note: Served from 1832-1835)
- Preceded by: Samuel Trehawke Kekewich; Lewis William Buck
- Succeeded by: Sir William Follett; Edward Divett

Member of the Great Britain Parliament for North Devon
- In office 1857–1865 Serving with Charles Hupburne-Stuart-Forbes-Trefusis
- Preceded by: Lewis William Buck; Sir Thomas Acland, 10th Bt
- Succeeded by: Sir Thomas Acland, 11th Bt; Charles Hepburn-Stuart-Forbes-Trefusis

Personal details
- Born: 1 October 1798
- Died: 13 March 1865 (aged 66)

James Wentworth Buller (1 October 1798 – 13 March 1865) of Downes, Crediton, Devon, was a British Whig Member of Parliament for Exeter, in Devon, from 1830 to 1835, and for North Devon from 1857 to 1865.

== Early life ==
He was the son of James Buller (1766–1827), Member of Parliament (MP), of Downes, Devon, the grandson of James Buller (1717–1765), MP. His mother was Anne Buller, daughter of Bishop William Buller. Educated at Harrow School, he matriculated at Oriel College, Oxford in 1815, graduating B.A. in 1819 and entering Lincoln's Inn that year. In 1820 he became a Fellow of All Souls College.

== Marriage and children ==
He married Charlotte Juliana Jane Howard-Molyneux-Howard, daughter of Lord Henry Thomas Howard-Molyneux-Howard and Elizabeth Long, on 5 October 1831. The couple had seven sons and four daughters. The sons included:

- General Rt. Hon. Sir Redvers Henry Buller (1839–1908), V.C.
- Arthur Tremayne Buller 19 March 1850 – 28 January 1917), father of the cricketer Eric Tremayne Buller (d. 1973).

Parliament of the United Kingdom
Preceded by Samuel Trehawke Kekewich; Lewis William Buck	Member of Parliament for Exeter; 1830 – 1835; With: Lewis William Buck to 1832; Edward Divett from 1832	Succeeded by Sir William Webb Follett; Edward Divett
Preceded by Lewis William Buck; Sir Thomas Dyke Acland, Bt (1)	Member of Parliament for North Devon; 1857 – 1865; With: Charles Hepburn-Stuart-Forbes-Trefusis	Succeeded by Sir Thomas Dyke Acland, Bt (2); Charles Hepburn-Stuart-Forbes-Trefusis
