= John Gendall =

English painter

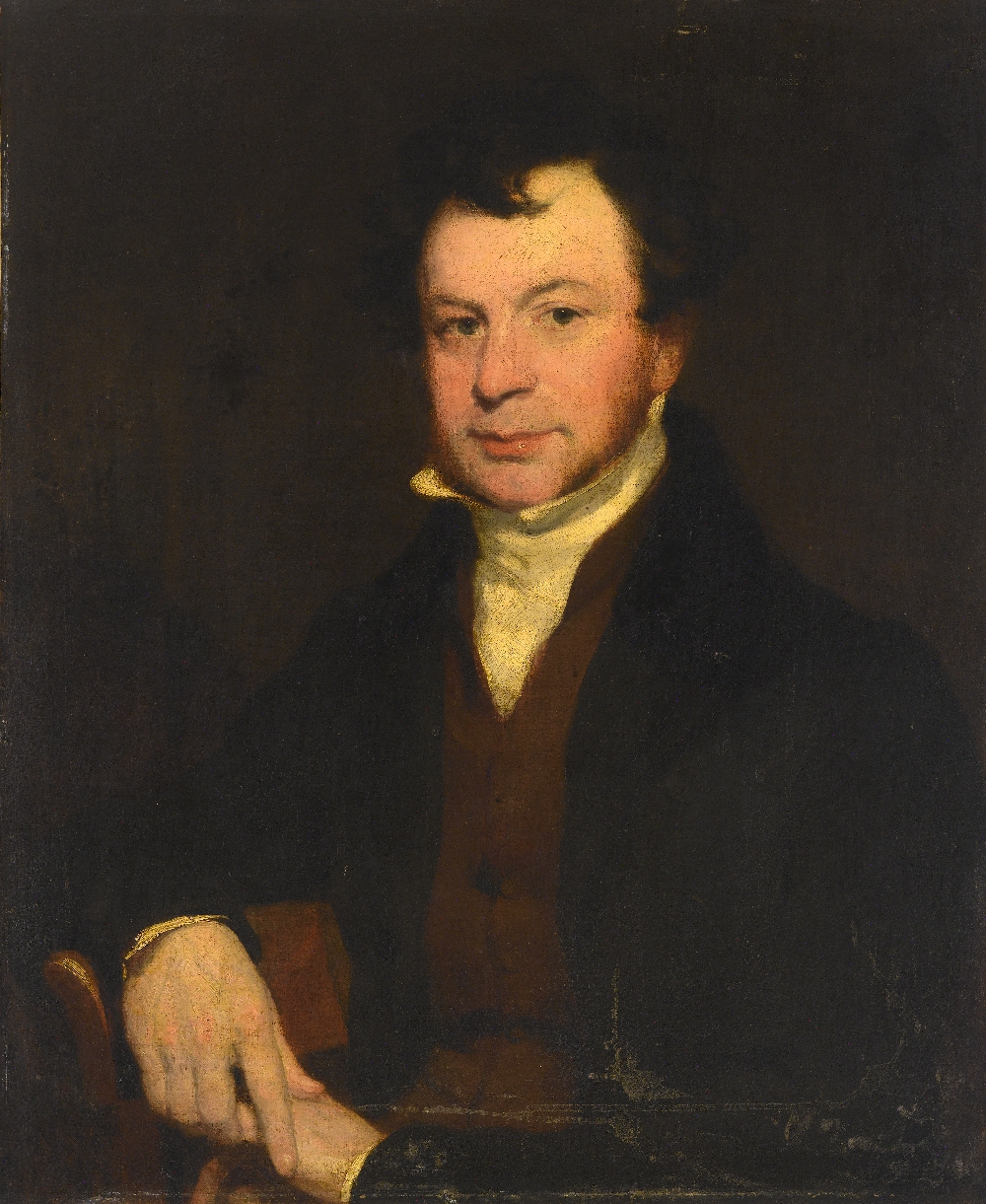
- c. 1840 portrait of John Gendall by John Prescott Knight
- Born: c. 1790; Exeter, England
- Died: 1 March 1865 (aged 74–75); Exeter, England

John Gendall (c. 1790 – 1 March 1865) was a British painter known particularly for his landscapes of Devon. Gendall was involved in the early use of lithography in London. He was born and died in Exeter, where he assisted with the creation of the museum and the university.

== Life ==
Gendall was baptised in Exeter on 2 January 1790 at St Edmund's Church. He was the son of John and Frances Gendall. Gendall was employed as a servant but his drawings were talent spotted by an employee of the print seller Rudolf Ackermann in a shop owned by W. Cole. Ackermann arranged to bring Gendall to London where he initially worked filing artists images. During his time with Ackermann he became a manager and he was involved with the company's early experiments with lithography. Gendall was involved in a number of Ackermann's publications including his 1821 Picturesque Tour of the Seine, from Paris to the Sea ... written by Jean-Baptiste-Balthazard Sauvan and illustrated by Augustus Pugin and Gendall.

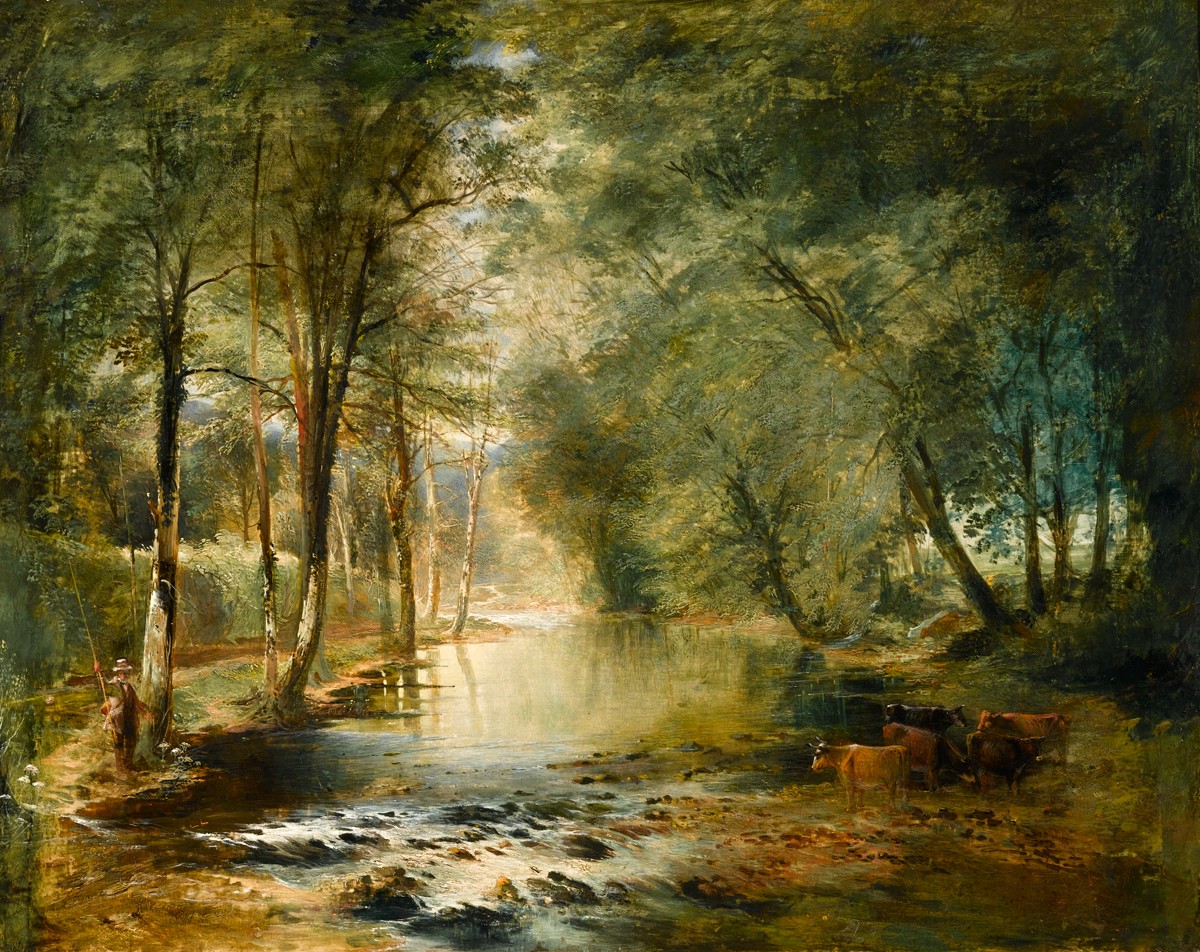
View on the Avon by Gendall

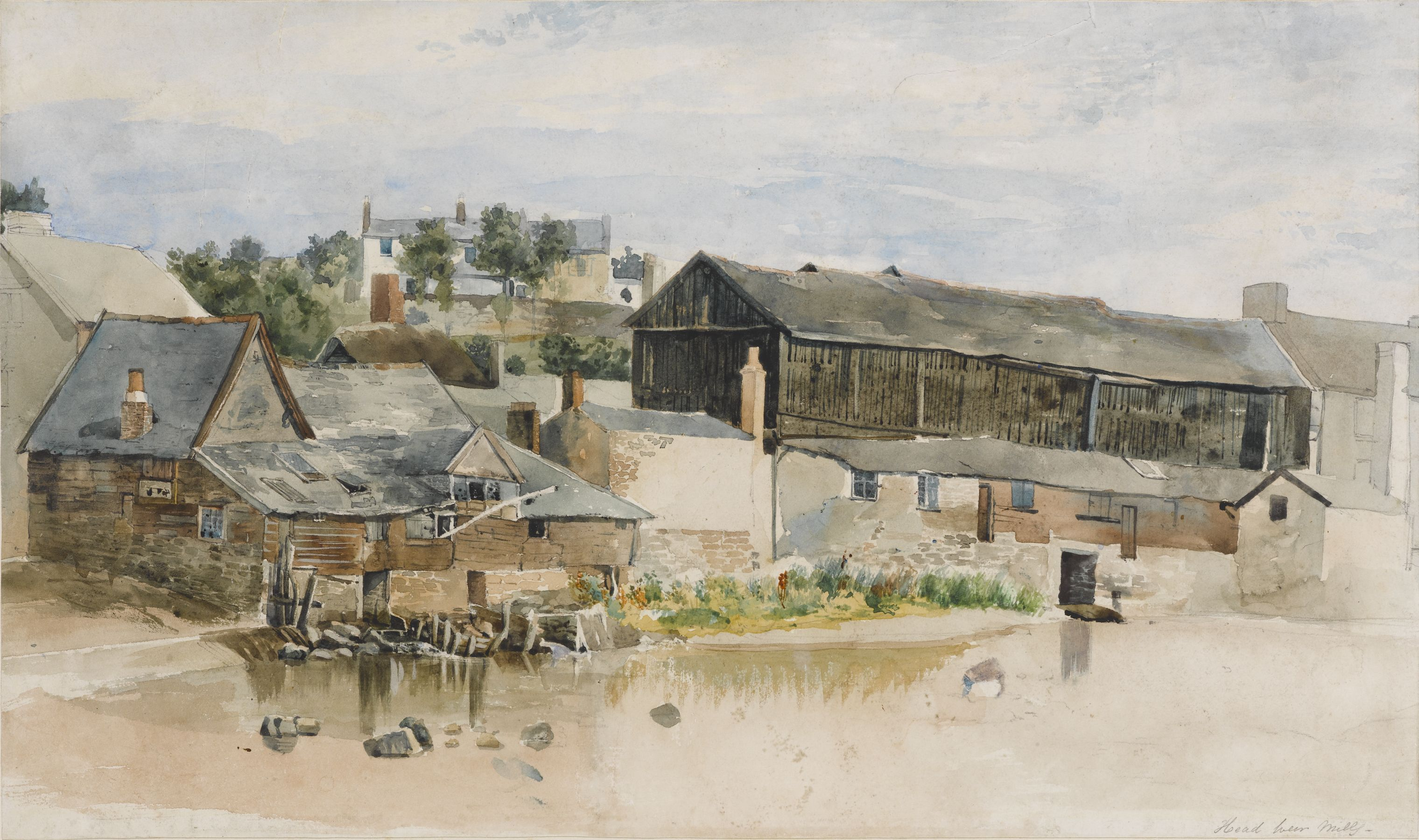
'‘Head Weir Mills’. This watercolour on paper depicts a series of mill buildings near the Head Weir, Exeter

On 19 January 1824 he married the widow of fellow artist Daniel Havell (1785–1822), Maria Alice Havell (née Wilmot) (1796–1873), daughter of Dr. Samuel & Martha (née Russell) Wilmot at St Martin-in-the-Fields on Trafalgar Square. That same year he also left his employment with Ackermann and returned to his home town with his new wife, where he exhibited a large view of the Thames in the Exeter Art Exhibition. Gendall went into partnership with W. Cole, who ran the shop that had been responsible for him being initially discovered. Gendall and his wife lived at 10–11 Cathedral Close. The elder Cole was able to call on Gendall's experience, and the partnership continued until the business went bankrupt and Cole retired. Gendall then launched a similar business based at an Exeter coffee house called Mol's Coffee House.

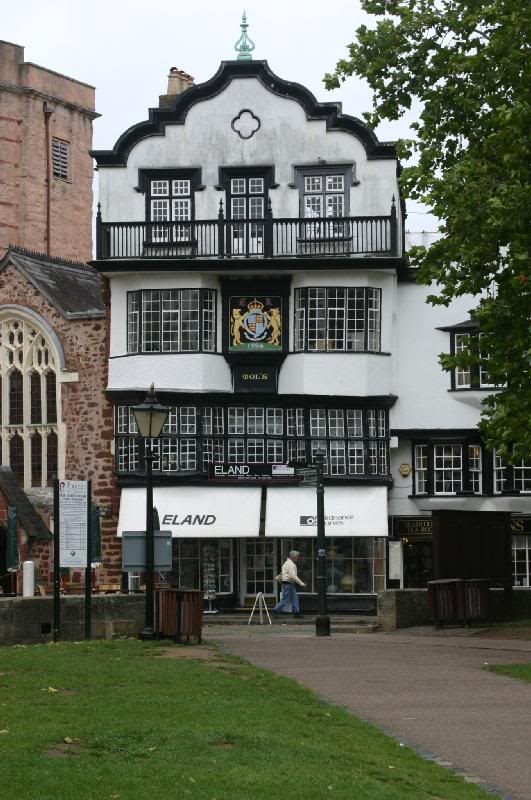
Mol's Coffee House today

Gendall's reputation enabled him to launch an art school that attracted Richard Ford, who was a writer, and local Edward Bowring Stephens, who became a sculptor, besides sculptor William John Seward Webber.,

1854 saw the establishment of Exeter University, and in 1861 Gendall was very involved with creation of a museum for Exeter. Gendall volunteered to pull together the initial collections required to fill the Royal Albert Memorial Museum, but he died before the museum opened.

== Legacy ==
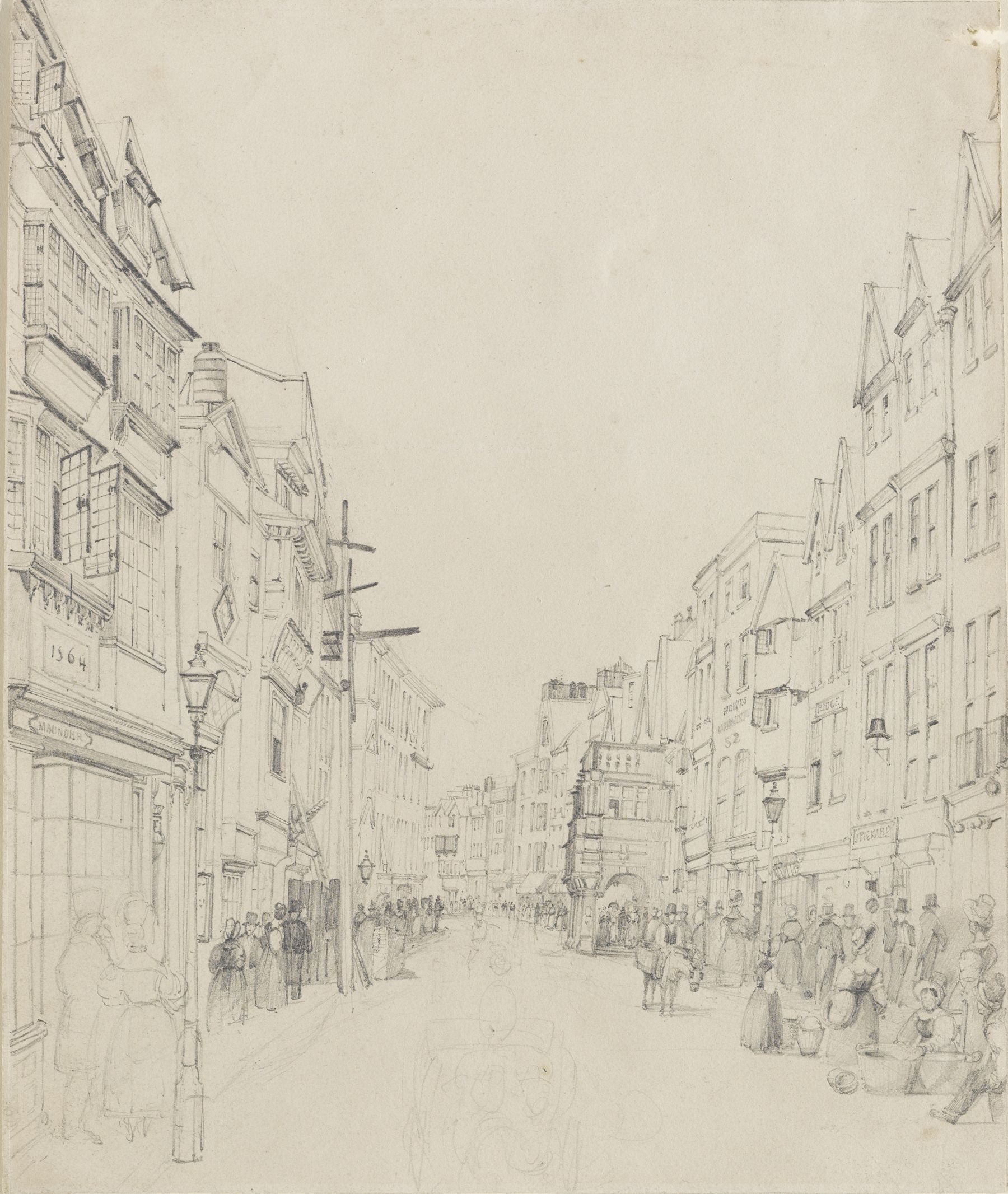
In the High Street, between 1820 and 1865, pencil on paper

Gendall died in Exeter in 1865, and his wife arranged a final exhibition and sale a few months later. His former pupil Edward Bowring Stephens launched an unsuccessful campaign to buy some of his work for Exeter, but the museum has since made purchases. As a result, Gendall has a number of paintings in the Royal Albert Memorial Museum.
