= Ruby Country =

Coordinates: 51.075°N 3.284°W

Ruby Country is the name given to the rural inland hinterland of north-west Devon, UK. It covers 45 parishes around the market towns of Holsworthy and Hatherleigh. These two towns were at the centre of the 2001 Foot and Mouth Disease outbreak, and although agriculture was directly affected, most local businesses suffered considerable financial hardship.

As a result, the Ruby Country Initiative was established, a not for profit partnership, to help create a more robust and sustainable local economy, and to create an identity for the area.

The project is supported by a number of organisations: Devon County Council, Devon Renaissance, Devon Wildlife Trust, Forestry Commission, Hatherleigh Area Project, Holsworthy Market and Coastal Town Initiative, North Devon's Biosphere Reserve, Torridge District Council and West Devon Borough Council.
