= Edward Courtenay, 12th Earl of Devon =

British peer and Conservative politician

Edward Baldwin Courtenay, 12th Earl of Devon (7 May 1836 – 15 January 1891), styled Lord Courtenay between 1859 and 1888, was a British peer and Conservative politician.

== Background ==
Devon was the son of William Courtenay, 11th Earl of Devon, and his wife Elizabeth, daughter of Hugh Fortescue, 1st Earl Fortescue. He was first educated at Westminster School, before attending Christ Church, Oxford.

== Political career ==
Devon represented the Conservative Party as Member of Parliament for Exeter from 1864 to 1868 and for Devon East for two years from 1868 to 1870 before resigning. John Kennaway replaced him at his second constituency. Devon was known for his advocacy of women's rights, and joined the Albemarle Club, a members club open to both men and women. In 1888 he succeeded his father in the earldom and entered the House of Lords, following that he became a governor of the London Charterhouse and a Deputy Lieutenant for Devonshire.

== Death ==
Lord Devon died unmarried in January 1891, aged 54. He was walking through Trafalgar Square and staggered to call a cab back to his residence. He passed unconscious and died after he arrived, with Devon being considered to have suffered from apoplexy. The funeral took place on 21 January, with the body encased within three coffins, with one made of elm, one of lead and one of oak. The exterior coffin was adorned with brass fittings and a plaque describing Lord Devon. He was succeeded in the earldom by his uncle, Hugh Courtenay. His remains were interred at the church near to Powderham Castle, alongside those of his ancestors.

Parliament of the United Kingdom
Preceded by Edward Divett; Richard Sommers Gard	Member of Parliament for Exeter; 1864–1868; With: Richard Sommers Gard 1864–1865; John Coleridge 1865–1868	Succeeded by John Coleridge; Edgar Alfred Bowring
New constituency	Member of Parliament for Devon East; 1868–1870; With: Sir Lawrence Palk, Bt	Succeeded by Sir Lawrence Palk, Bt; Sir John Henry Kennaway, Bt
Peerage of England
Preceded by William Reginald Courtenay	Earl of Devon; 1888–1891	Succeeded by Henry Hugh Courtenay
