= William Webb Follett =

English lawyer and politician

Sir William Webb Follett QC
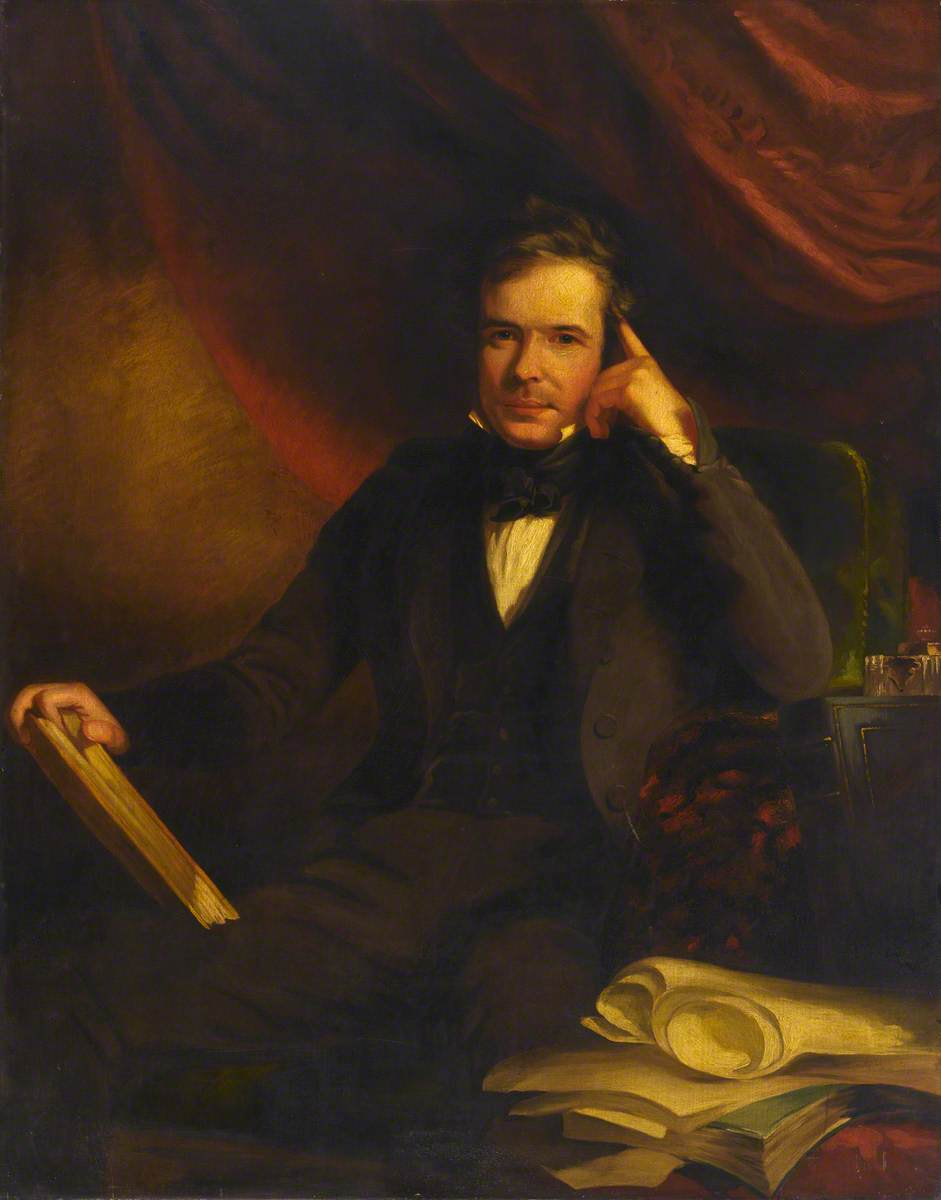
- Portrait by Frederick Richard Say, c. 1835

Attorney General for England and Wales
- In office 15 April 1844 – 28 June 1845
- Prime Minister: Sir Robert Peel
- Preceded by: Sir Frederick Pollock
- Succeeded by: Sir Frederic Thesiger

Solicitor General for England and Wales
- In office 1841–1844
- Prime Minister: Sir Robert Peel
- Preceded by: Sir Thomas Wilde
- Succeeded by: Sir Frederic Thesiger
- In office 1834–1835
- Prime Minister: Sir Robert Peel
- Preceded by: Sir Robert Rolfe
- Succeeded by: Sir Robert Rolfe

Member of Parliament for Exeter
- In office 6 January 1835 – 28 June 1845
- Preceded by: James Wentworth Buller; Edward Divett
- Succeeded by: Sir John Duckworth, Bt; Edward Divett

Personal details
- Born: 2 December 1796 Topsham, Devon
- Died: 28 June 1845 (aged 48) Regent's Park, London
- Party: Conservative
- Education: Trinity College, Cambridge

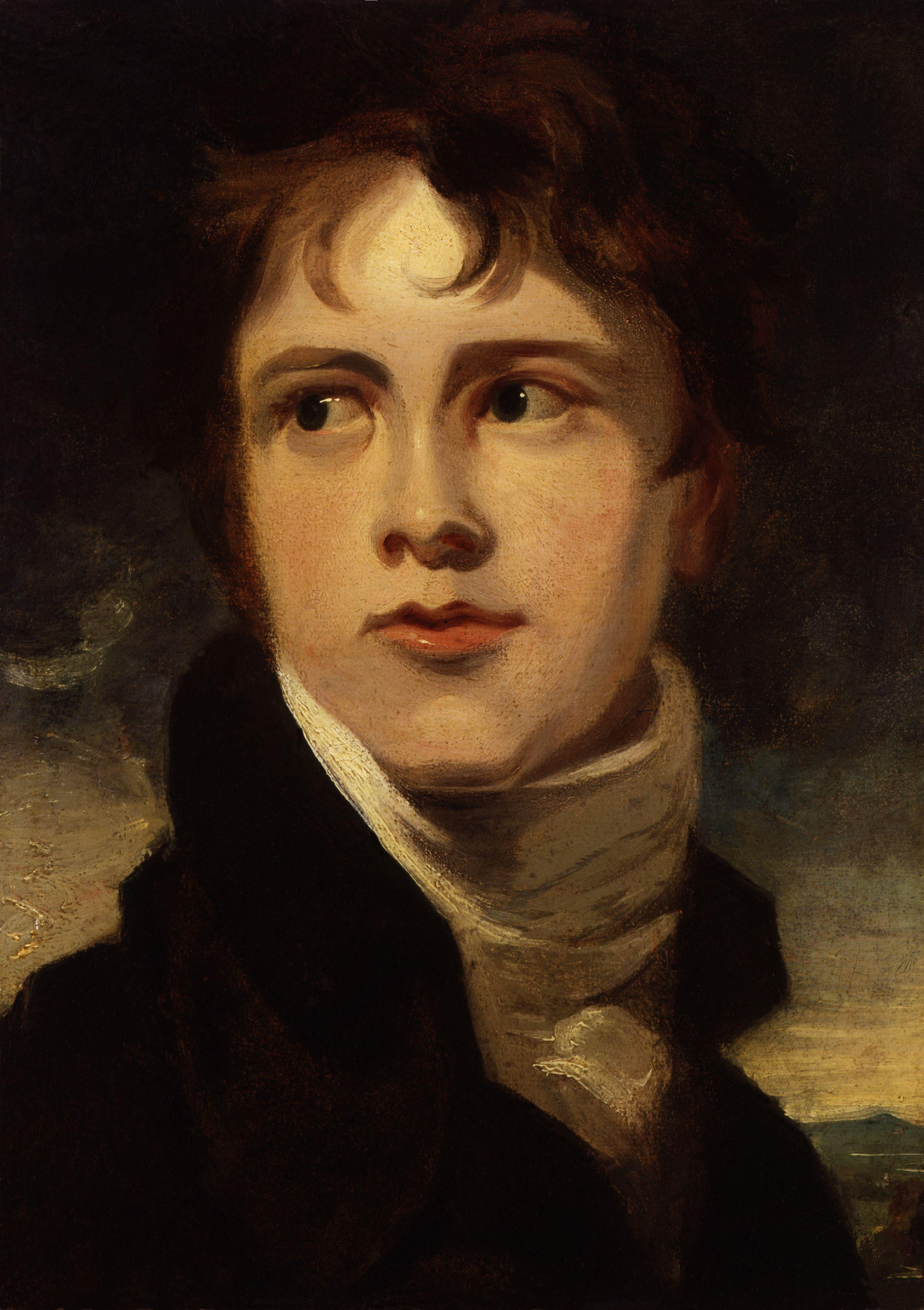
Sir William Webb Follett, portrait by Sir Martin Archer Shee (1769–1850). National Portrait Gallery, London

Sir William Webb Follett, QC (2 December 1796 – 28 June 1845) was an English lawyer and politician who served as MP for Exeter (1835–1845). He served twice as Solicitor-General, in 1834-5 and 1841 and as Attorney-General in 1844. He was knighted in 1835. He was reputed to have been the "greatest advocate of the century".

== Early life ==
Follett was born 2 December 1796 at Topsham in Devon, the eldest surviving son of ten children. His father was Captain Benjamin Follett, late 13th Regiment of Infantry, who had retired from the army in 1790 and gone into business as a timber merchant, and his mother was Ann Webb, daughter of John Webb, of Kinsale, Ireland. His younger brother was Brent Spencer Follett (1810–1887) QC, MP and his sister Elizabeth married Richard Bright.

Follett attended Exeter grammar school and was privately educated by Mr Hutchinson, the curate of Heavitree. In 1813, he matriculated at Trinity College, Cambridge, receiving a B.A. without honours in 1818 and an M.A. in 1830.

On 11 October 1830, Follett married Jane Mary Giffard, the eldest daughter of Sir Ambrose Hardinge Giffard (1771–1827) who was chief justice of British Ceylon. They had five sons and two daughters.

== Career ==
He joined the Inner Temple in Michaelmas term 1814 and read in the chambers of Robert Bayly and Godfrey Sykes. He became a special pleader in 1821 and was called to the bar on 28 May 1824. He joined the western circuit in 1825, where his first notable case was Garnett v Ferrand.

In November 1828, he and Henry Brougham were briefed on the case of Rowe v Brenton and when Brougham became Lord Chancellor, he offered to make Follett a silk, but Follett declined. He had a large practice with the House of Lords and, when it was re-organised in 1833, the Privy Council of the United Kingdom.

In 1832, Follett ran to be a Member of Parliament for Exeter but was unsuccessful. Instead he served as recorder for Exeter from 1832 to 1834, when Sir Robert Peel formed his first administration. He became solicitor-general in November and thereafter was appointed a King's Counsel and received a knighthood.

On 6 January 1835, he was returned to parliament for Exeter with 1425 votes. He resigned with the ministry in April 1835. In 1837 and 1841, Follett was re-elected to Parliament. On the return of Peel to power in 1841 Follett was again appointed Solicitor-General on 6 September, and on 15 April 1844 he succeeded Sir Frederick Pollock as Attorney-General.

Follett never gave up his private practice. He was best known for defending James Brudenell, 7th Earl of Cardigan in 1841 after a duel with Captain Harvey Tuckett, and representing George Chapple Norton in an action against Lord Melbourne in 1836. His speech in the latter case was parodied in the Pickwick Papers (1837).

== Death and legacy ==
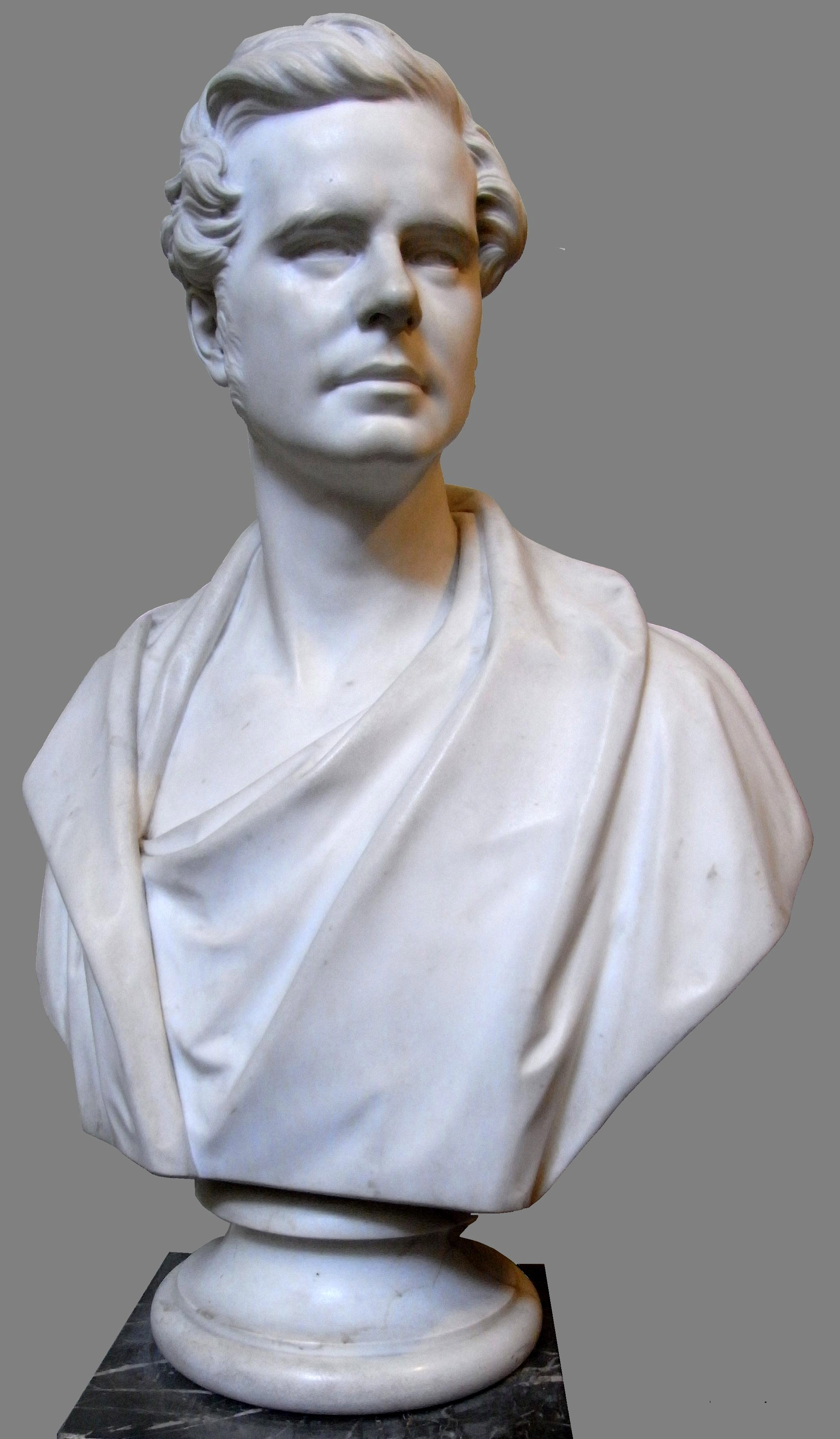
Sir William Webb-Follett. Marble bust sculpted by Edward Bowring Stephens, presented in 1842 to the Devon & Exeter Institution, Exeter

Follett was first ill in December 1835 and April 1836. He collapsed in February 1839 and could not return to work until later that year. He collapsed again in April 1844 and he was compelled to relinquish legal practice and to visit the south of Europe to recuperate. He returned to England in March 1845, but the tuberculosis, with which he had previously been diagnosed, reasserted itself and he died at Croker's house, 9 Cumberland Terrace, Regent's Park, London on 28 June 1845. He was buried in the Temple Church in London on 4 July.

A statue of Follett executed by William Behnes was erected by subscription and placed in the north transept at Westminster Abbey. His marble bust by Edward Bowring Stephens exists in the Devon and Exeter Institution, Exeter.

Parliament of the United Kingdom
Preceded by James Wentworth Buller; Edward Divett	Member of Parliament for Exeter; 1835 – 1845; With: Edward Divett	Succeeded by Sir John Duckworth, Bt; Edward Divett
Political offices
Preceded by Sir Robert Rolfe	Solicitor General for England and Wales; 1834–1835	Succeeded by Sir Robert Rolfe
Preceded by Sir Thomas Wilde	Solicitor General for England and Wales; 1841–1844	Succeeded by Sir Frederic Thesiger
Preceded by Sir Frederick Pollock	Attorney General for England and Wales; 1844–1845	Succeeded by Sir Frederic Thesiger
