= Hatherleigh =

Town in Devon, England

Coordinates: 50.8167°N 4.0667°W

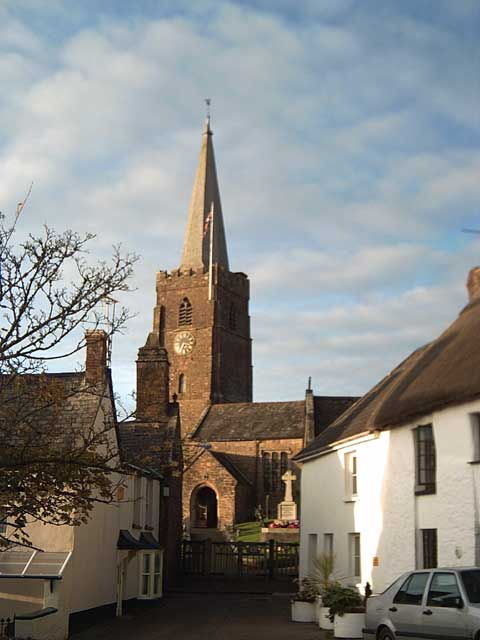
- Hatherleigh church

- Location within Devon
- Population: 1,902 (2021 Census)
- OS grid reference: SS5404
- Civil parish: Hatherleigh
- District: West Devon
- Shire county: Devon
- Region: South West
- Country: England
- Sovereign state: United Kingdom
- Post town: Okehampton
- Postcode district: EX20
- Dialling code: 01837
- Website: Community page website

Hatherleigh is a market town in the West Devon district, in the county of Devon, England. It is situated near the River Lew, approximately 35 miles (56 km) north-northeast of Plymouth, 24 miles (39 km) west-northwest of Exeter, and 6 miles (9.7 km) north-northwest of Okehampton. It had a population of 1,902 at the 2021 census, making it the smallest town in Devon.

== Toponymy ==
The name Hatherleigh derives from either the Old English haguþornlēah meaning 'hawthorn wood or clearing' or from hǣddrelēah meaning 'heather wood or clearing'.

== History ==
An impressive obelisk one mile (1.6 km) east of the town commemorates Lt Col. William Morris (d. 1858 in India): it was built in 1860.

Hatherleigh was the beginning of the 7th stage of the Tour of Britain in September 2009 and record numbers turned out to watch the famous race begin. Hatherleigh had often been on the course of the Tour but this was the first time a stage had started in the town.

Hatherleigh saw the Olympic torch pass through the town on 21 May 2012.

== Economy ==
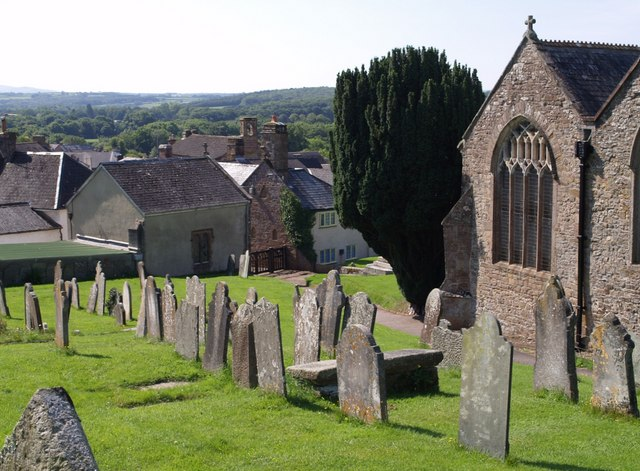
Churchyard in Hatherleigh

Hatherleigh is home to two pubs, The Tally Ho and The George. The George was burned down in an arson attack on 23 December 2008 and has subsequently been rebuilt and re-opened in 2010. More than 100 firefighters from across the county were drafted in to help fight the blaze which was still burning well into the early hours of Christmas Eve. Hatherleigh also has a cafe, two hairdressers, craft shops, a beauty salon, a butcher, a newsagency, a vets, medical centre, a convenience shop and a petrol station.

The parish church is dedicated to St John the Baptist and has a western tower topped by a shingled spire. The spire was destroyed in the Burns' Day Storm of 1990 and a replica of the original now stands in its place. The nave and aisles are divided by granite arcades. The font is Norman and the original wagon roofs remain. Since 2024, a disused vestry in the church grounds has housed a gymnasium.

The town is part of the Ruby Country which covers 45 parishes around the market towns of Holsworthy and Hatherleigh. These two towns were at the centre of the 2001 Foot and Mouth Disease outbreak, and although agriculture was directly affected, most local businesses suffered considerable financial hardship. As a result, the Ruby Country Initiative was established, a not for profit partnership, to help create a more robust and sustainable local economy, and to create an identity for the area.

== Demography ==
There is an electoral ward with the same name. The population at the 2021 census was 3,229.

== Transport ==
There is no railway station within Hatherleigh's boundaries. However residents can use the nearby railway station in Okehampton now that the Dartmoor Line has reopened with regular services to Exeter.

== Events ==
It hosts an arts festival in July, and a carnival in November featuring two flaming tar barrel runs. The Walruses meet on New Year's Day to jump into the River Lew to raise money for local good causes, this tradition which started in the 1980s came to end on 1 January 2018. An annual half-marathon called the Ruby Run takes place usually in June between Holsworthy and Hatherleigh, starting from each town in alternate years.

Hatherleigh Market has weekly sales of sheep, cattle and poultry with increased sales on Tuesdays. The market formally closed in February 2018 due to the site being sold to make way for a new housing development, the Tuesday pannier market continues and there will be provision and a new building in the development. In September 2019 the demolition of the site began as of March 2020 only one building of the market remains to temporary house the pannier market, the new development is moving at pace with many of the new buildings now rising from the ground.
