= Nahem Shoa =

English painter

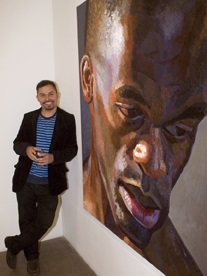
- Nahem Shoa standing next to his Giant Head of Ben on display at Hartlepool Art Gallery
- Born: 1968 (age 57–58); Notting Hill
- Education: Studied under Robert Lenkiewicz
- Alma mater: London College of Printing; Manchester School of Art; Royal Drawing School
- Known for: Giant Heads; portraits of mixed-race and Black Britishers
- Movement: New British Realists
- Awards: Lord Leighton Prize; 1991; BP Portrait Award; 1992; Carroll Foundation Award; 1992; Elizabeth Greenshields Foundation Award; 1994
- Website: http://NahemShoa.co.uk/

Nahem Shoa (/ˈnɑːhəm ˈʃoʊə/, born 1968) is a contemporary English painter best known for his series of portraits, collectively called Giant Heads, which were painted at up to 15 times life size. He is also notable for having increased the number of portraits of Black and mixed-race British people on display in British museums. Shoa has won a number of awards and prizes for his work, and serves on The Royal Albert Memorial Museum and Art Gallery's Contemporary Arts Panel. His work has been exhibited in London's National Portrait Gallery and the Royal Academy as well as at galleries and museums in other parts of the UK.

== Early life and education ==
Nahem Shoa was born to Jewish parents in England in 1968. Showing artistic interest at a young age, Shoa first trained at 16 as an apprentice to the anti-establishment British artist Robert Lenkiewicz. He continued studying under Lenkiewicz at intervals for eight years. Shoa also explored graffiti art as a teenager. Soon after graduating from London College of Printing in 1988, Shoa began winning prizes for his work. Shoa went on to complete a BA in Fine Art at Manchester School of Art in 1991 and a Postgraduate at Royal Drawing School in 2004. From his student days in Manchester, he was determined to be a professional painter.

== Early career ==
Shoa showed his art in group exhibitions at Manchester City Art Gallery, where he won first prize, in 1989; at Holden Gallery in Manchester, and at Leighton House — for which he won the Lord Leighton Prize — both in 1991; the Summer Exhibition of the Royal Academy of Arts in 1992; the National Portrait Gallery, also in 1992; at the NatWest-sponsored Young Artists of the 90s show, for which he again won first prize, in 1995; as part of The Sacred Body at James Colman Fine Art, in 1996; and at Montpelier Sandelson gallery in 1999.

== Giant Heads ==
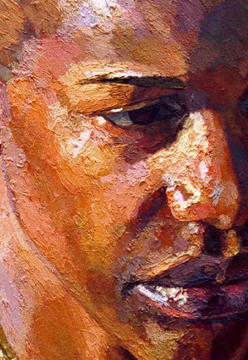
A detail from Giant Head of Desiree, a portrait of a Black British woman

Shoa specialised in live-model portraiture until 2007. Unlike many portraitists, he worked with live models rather than reference photographs. His 2004 oil series Giant Heads, featuring British citizens from different ethnic and sexual backgrounds, was exhibited at four major solo shows: Bury Art Gallery and Museum, Coventry's Herbert Art Gallery and Museum, Hartlepool City Art Gallery, and Plymouth City Museum and Art Gallery. The artist said this series of paintings "aims to capture and celebrate the multicultural nature of our society."

One of these works, Giant Head of Ben, was purchased in 2004 by Hartlepool Art Gallery with the assistance of a grant from The Art Fund.

Shoa's objective behind his four 2004 shows was to rebalance the lack of positive imagery for Black Britishers in UK art galleries. He had noted that Black people were portrayed there almost exclusively in the historical context of slavery or servitude, and complained that, "in Tate Modern there isn't a single [B]lack image and the same can be said of many major collections". His own culturally-diverse Jewish parentage, stemming from an Adenite Jewish father with "some Ethiopian blood" and a Russian-Scottish mother — combined with a London upbringing in the multicultural Notting Hill neighborhood notably characterised in the London novels of Colin MacInnes — fostered Shoa's early sensitivity to ethnic, gender and cultural injustices.

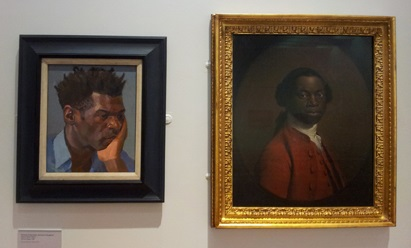
Shoa's portrait of fellow artist Desmond Haughton on display beside Portrait of an African at RAMM

The 2014 donation of Desmond — a portrait of his Notting Hill childhood pal, the Black British artist Desmond Haughton — to Exeter's Royal Albert Memorial Museum and Art Gallery demonstrated Shoa's ongoing egalitarian commitment. A 2015 article by Isobel Johnstone, past curator of the Arts Council Collection, discussed the significance of the donation:

Portraits of [B]lack subjects are rare in galleries even today and Shoa's picture makes a strong point by its very existence here. Artistically it measures up. It also reveals Shoa's painting skills — strong structure that is the legacy of Cézanne and Cubism, and vibrant colour created from a palette devoid of black and earth pigments. The close-up pose reflects the popular intimacy of today's media. This contemporary portrait of fellow painter Desmond Haughton is a small measure of what Shoa has been best known for to date.

Desmond now hangs beside the Exeter gallery's iconic Portrait of an African — one of the rare 18th-century paintings of a Black gentleman of means. Portrait of an African was formerly believed to be of Olaudah Equiano, and is attributed to Allan Ramsay. Shoa's other portraits of Black Britishers hang in Bury Museum and Art Gallery and Plymouth City Museum and Art Gallery.

== Other works ==
By 2007, Shoa had established himself as an artist invested in representing British ethnic and sexual diversity. Isobel Johnstone, Arts Council's London Collection curator from 1979 to 2004, described Shoa's painting Kiki and Helen as being "of a lesbian couple one naked the other clothed. The frontal posture of the naked figure echoes Henri Matisse, even Stanley Spencer, but for Shoa a more appropriate comparison would be with Rembrandt's The Jewish Bride because of the way in which the hands touch." Johnstone also noted, "Shoa's ambition was to make sure his multiculturalism was not the art of outsiders."

A series of massive skull studies drew the larger-than-life phase of Shoa's work to a close. Some of his later works included composite imagery of catastrophes, such as floods, nuclear disasters and riots. Curator Isobel Johnstone described these works thusly: "Most recently Shoa made another dramatic move — from a tangible kind of reality to something quite intangible – where, contrary to all previous methods of working, accident was allowed to prompt imagination."

== Exhibitions in detail: 2004–2014 ==
In 2004, Nahem Shoa had two large-scale, one-man shows in regional art galleries: Youth Culture Multi Culture at Plymouth City Art Gallery and Museum, and Giant Heads & Multi-Culture at the Hartlepool Art Gallery. The exhibition at Plymouth City Gallery included 16 paintings from the "Giant Heads" series, and another 40 large-format portraits, and also included a display of works inspired by Shoa's portraits.

In 2005, his solo exhibition We Are Here, at The Herbert, Coventry City Art Gallery, featured giant portraits of ten Black and multiracial models as part of the gallery's observance of Black History Month. These solo shows in 2004 and 2005 broke previous attendance records at each gallery.

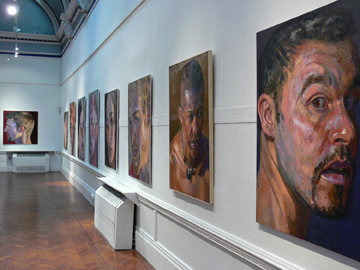
A view of nine of the portraits shown as part of Facing Yourself, including a self-portrait and Giant Head of Desiree (first and second from the right)

In 2006, Shoa's work was included in an exhibition he curated at Hartlepool Art Gallery, alongside paintings by Frank Auerbach, Lucian Freud and Robert Lenkiewicz.

Also in 2006, Shoa had a solo exhibition titled Facing Yourself at Bury Art Gallery. Facing Yourself exhibited 25 oil paintings of people of varying ethnic backgrounds, including both Black and mixed-race subjects. The heads were 15 times larger than life, eliciting this reaction from Culture24 art critic Kay Carson: "[D]espite the grandiose scale, the mood is quite the opposite: muted, dignified and very personal."

In 2007, he featured in the group exhibition True To Life at the Herbert Art Gallery and Museum, with his work alongside that of fellow Realist painters Frank Auerbach, David Bomberg, Lucian Freud, and Robert Lenkiewicz.

In April and May 2010, Shoa's Giant Head of Ben was included in In Thy Face I See, a group show at Hartlepool Art Gallery focused on portraiture.

In 2013, Shoa contributed drawings for a group exhibition for the House of the Nobleman group exhibition Paper Vernacular: Drawings & Constructions, part of the Cutlog art festival in New York.

In April 2014, his Giant Head of Ben was shown alongside Lucian Freud's Head of a Woman as part of the exhibition Face to Face: Portraits Past and Present at Hartlepool Art Gallery.

== Reception ==
=== Critical reception ===
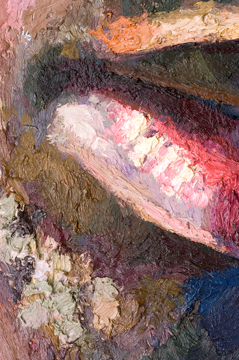
Close-up of part of Giant Head of Ben, showing the abstract effect

David Whetstone, writing in The Journal, called Shoa's work "extraordinary", characterized him as "approach[ing] the planes and gradients of the face as a landscape painter would an appealing view" and noted his commitment to artistic representation of cultural diversity.

Critic Rob Haynes of Metro praised the way Shoa's large-scale portraits "offer the viewer different ways of looking, choosing between the near-abstract effect from close up or the detailed accuracy from a distance." Haynes also called the works in Shoa's Facing Yourself show "impressive" and compared Shoa's brushwork to Monet's. Shoa's style of portraiture has been compared to that of Lucian Freud.

"Shoa brings to life multi-cultural Britain and its youth culture with technically brilliant painting," The Journal's critic said in a later review, and marked Shoa's participation in the New British Realists movement.

Culture24 art critic Kay Carson picked out one of Shoa's larger-than-life portraits about which to declare, "[t]he grace of Desiree (2002) is just breathtaking."

A profile of Shoa and his work, titled "Nahem Shoa: A Superstar in Waiting", appeared in the Autumn 2007 issue of Art in London magazine; in it, critic Rachel Crow described how if one of Shoa's models "cries or is angry [Shoa] lets that emotion come through in the painting", and said Shoa's "use of colour and texture is powerful and emotional." She also contrasted how while a Shoa portrait seen up close "appears to be abstract because of the amount of texture and color layered onto the canvas, [... when the viewer steps back] a realist portrait appears with the personality of the sitter emerging". Crow went on to discuss the first of Shoa's skull portraits, noting how Shoa "was able to give it life and personality" and lauding "the sense of depth he was able to create." Art in London also approved of Shoa's "disciplined work ethic" of eight-hour days, six days per week, with some of his days off devoted to teaching portraiture to other painters.

=== Public recognition ===
Shoa was listed in both 2002's Who's Who in Art, by Bernard Dolman, and 2007's Artists in Britain Since 1945, by David Buckman.

Hartlepool Art Gallery issued a series of greeting cards featuring art in their collections, including Shoa's Giant Head of Ben, in 2006; the works selected to appear on the cards were voted for by museum visitors.

In 2007, Giant Head of Ben was one of five finalists in a resident vote for which Hartlepool-held artworks should be included in the town's new virtual gallery.

== Talks and publications ==
In 1994, some of Shoa's work was published as part of Drawing Figures, an art-instruction text published in association with the Royal Academy of Arts.

Nahem Shoa has given several lectures about his mentor Robert Lenkiewicz, including 2007's "Close reading with Nahem Shoa", at the Novas Gallery, and 2014's "Sound Bites: Robert Lenkiewicz", in conjunction with the Seale-Hayne exhibition, Family Matters, of Lenkiewicz's work.

Shoa's essay, "You Offer Me a Dead Rose, May I Give You a Dead Rat?" was included in the book Robert Lenkiewicz: Self Portraits 2008.

The Ben Uri Gallery hosted an exhibition from 26 September–14 December 2008 titled Robert Lenkiewicz — The Self-Portraits (1956–2002), as a part of which Shoa gave a lecture entitled "Under The Influence".

In 2012, The Royal Albert Memorial Museum and Art Gallery invited Shoa to be a member of their Contemporary Arts Panel, serving as a consultant to RAMM for the promotion of contemporary art exhibitions.

In 2014, Shoa gave his lecture "Paradise Found" at Exeter's Royal Albert Memorial Museum and Art Gallery as part of the exhibition Detached and Timeless, which included paintings by David Bomberg, Prunella Clough, Patrick Heron, Peter Lanyon, and Clare Woods. Shoa's lecture explored the various approaches used by these painters to depict the landscape of Britain's southwest.

Also in 2014, Lenkiewicz Reconsidered: Perspectives in Conflict, to which Shoa contributed, was published by Halsgrove Publishing's Halstar imprint.

== Awards and prizes ==
- Manchester City Art Gallery Under 30s Show, first prize, 1989
- Lord Leighton Prize, 1991
- The National Portrait Gallery's BP Portrait Award, 1992
- Royal Society of Portrait Painters's Carroll Foundation Award, 1992
- Elizabeth Greenshields Foundation Award, 1994
- NatWest Young Artists of the 90s, first prize, 1995

== See also ==
- Rowley Gallery
