= Ignatius Sancho =

British abolitionist (1729–1780)

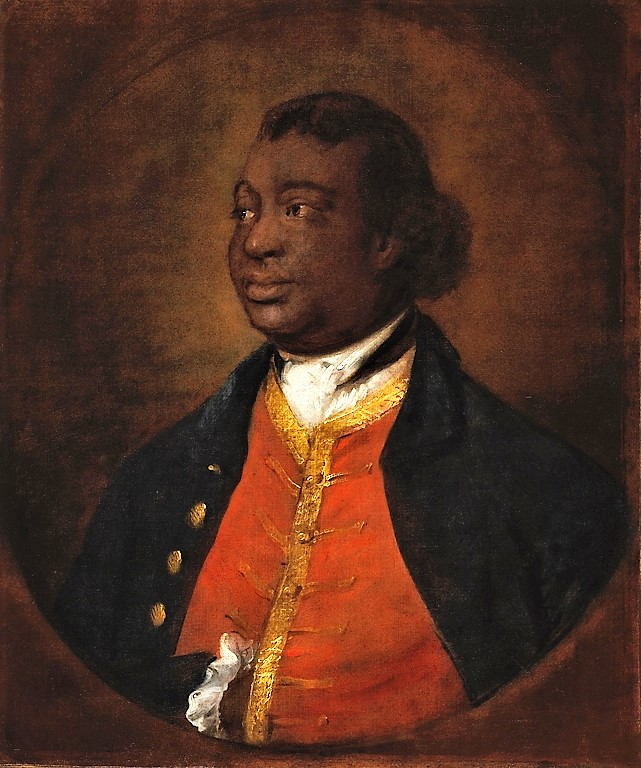
- Portrait by Thomas Gainsborough, c. 1768
- Born: Charles Ignatius Sancho c. 1729; Atlantic Ocean
- Died: 14 December 1780 (aged 50–51); London, England
- Occupations: Composer, writer, shopkeeper
- Known for: Second person of African descent to vote in a British general election; influence on abolitionism
- Spouse: Anne Osborne
- Children: Frances Joanna (1761–1815), Ann Alice (1763–1805), Elizabeth Bruce (1766–1837), Jonathan William (1768–1770), Lydia (1771–1776), Katherine Margaret (1773–1779), William Leach Osborne (1775–1810)

Charles Ignatius Sancho (c. 1729 – 14 December 1780) was a British writer, composer and abolitionist. Born on a slave ship in the Atlantic Ocean, Sancho was sold into slavery in the Spanish colony of New Granada. After his parents died, Sancho's owner took the two-year-old orphan to Britain and gave him to three sisters living in Greenwich, where he remained for eighteen years. Unable to bear being a servant to them, Sancho ran away to Montagu House in Blackheath, London where John Montagu, 2nd Duke of Montagu taught him how to read and encouraged Sancho's budding interest in literature. After spending some time as a butler in the household, Sancho left and started his own business as a shopkeeper, while also starting to write and publish various essays, plays and books.

Sancho quickly became involved in the nascent British abolitionist movement, which sought to outlaw both the slave trade and the institution of slavery itself, and he became one of its most devoted supporters. Sancho's status as a property-owner meant he was legally qualified to vote in a general election, a right he exercised in 1774 and 1780, becoming the second known British African to have voted in Britain after John London. Gaining fame in Britain as "the extraordinary Negro", Sancho became, to British abolitionists, a symbol of the humanity of Africans and the immorality of the slave trade and slavery. Sancho died in 1780. The Letters of the Late Ignatius Sancho, an African, edited and published two years after his death, are the first published letter collection by a writer of African descent.

== Early life ==
Charles Ignatius Sancho was born on a slave ship crossing the Atlantic Ocean, in what was known as the Middle Passage. His mother died not long after arriving in the Spanish colony of New Granada, which formed parts of modern-day Colombia, Ecuador, Panama, and Venezuela. He was baptised and named by the Catholic bishop of the colony. His father reportedly took his own life rather than live as a slave.

Sancho's owner took him, then barely two years old, to England and gave him to three unmarried sisters living together in Greenwich, where he lived from 1731 to 1749. The sisters gave him the surname Sancho as they believed he resembled Don Quixote's squire. The Duke of Montagu, a frequent visitor to the sisters, was impressed by Sancho's intellect, frankness, and amiability. He encouraged Sancho to read and lent him books from his personal library at Blackheath.

== Life in Britain ==
Sancho's informal education made his lack of freedom at Greenwich unbearable, and he ran away to Montagu House, Blackheath in 1749.

For two years until her death in 1751, Sancho worked as a butler for the Duchess of Montagu at her residence, where he immersed himself in music, poetry, reading, and writing. Upon her death in 1751, Sancho received an annuity of £30 (equivalent to £6,000 in 2025) and a year's salary.

It may have been at this time that he was freed, but the circumstances of his manumission are unknown.

=== Marriage ===
On 17 December 1758 he married a West Indian woman, Anne Osborne (1733-1817), becoming a devoted husband and father. They had seven children: Frances Joanna (1761-1815), Ann Alice (1763-1805), Elizabeth Bruce (1766-1837), Jonathan William (1768-1770), Lydia (1771-1776), Katherine Margaret (1773-1779), and William Leach Osborne (1775-1810). Around the time of the birth of their third child, Sancho became a valet to George Montagu, the son-in-law of his previous patron. Sancho remained a valet until 1773.

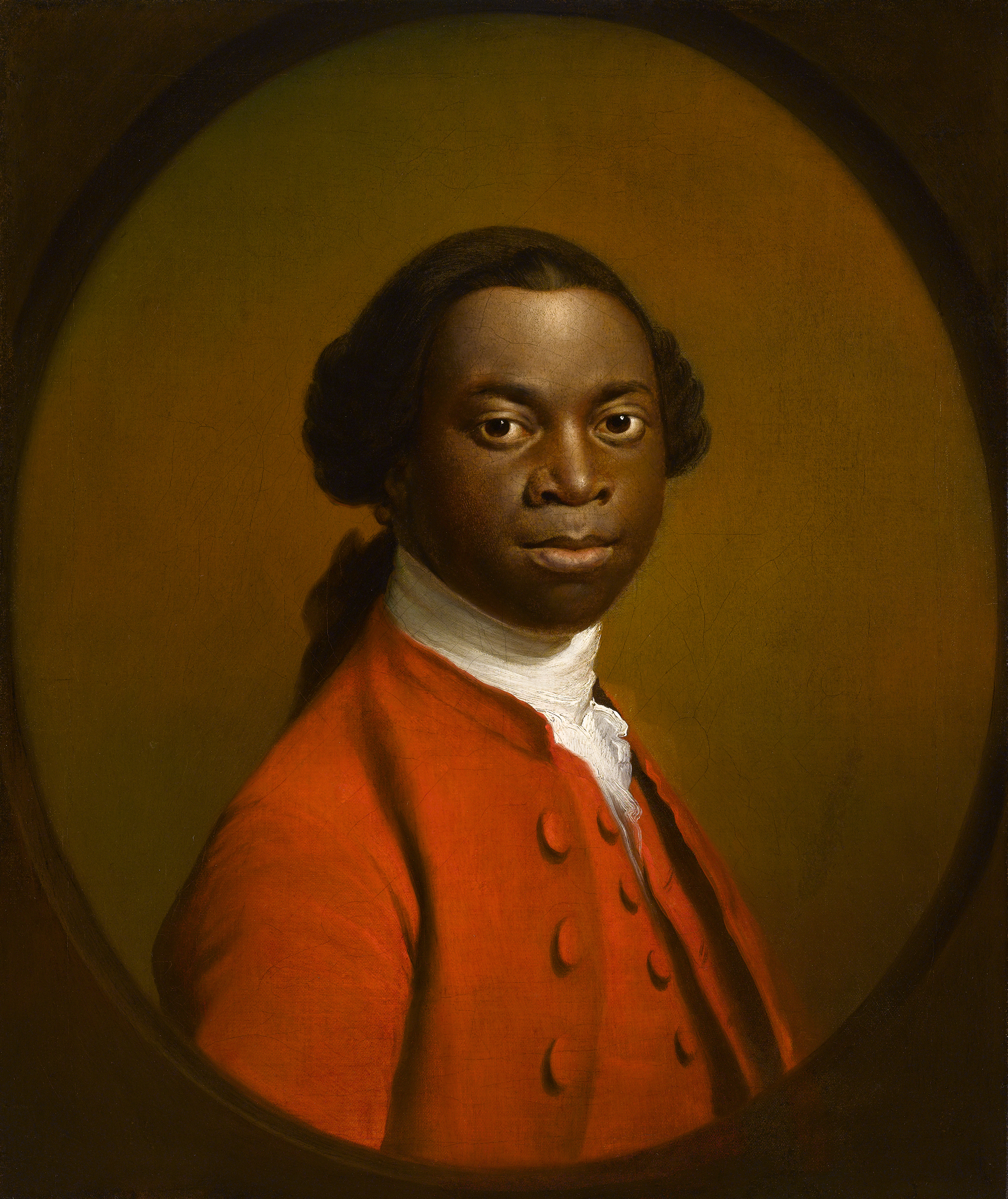
Portrait of a Man in a Red Suit which was thought to be a portrait of Sancho by Allan Ramsay. (Note: The identity of the painter and of his subject are subject to debate.) This has since been disputed.

In 1768, the British artist Thomas Gainsborough painted a portrait of Sancho at the same time as the Duchess of Montagu sat for her portrait by him. (Note: According to scholar Reyahn King, there is an inscription by antiquarian William Stevenson on the back of the canvas stating that Gainsborough completed the portrait in one hour and forty minutes on 29 November 1768. King praises the portrait for avoiding contemporary stereotypes of Africans and portraying Sancho as a very dignified and refined gentleman. He further argues that the Sancho portrait is the most accomplished portrait of an African person in British portraiture of the time. Bartolozzi's 1781 engraving based on Gainsborough's portrait of Sancho was used as the frontispiece when Sancho's Letters were published.) By the late 1760s, Sancho had become well accomplished and was considered by many to be a man of refinement. In 1766, at the height of the debate about slavery, Sancho wrote to Anglo-Irish novelist Laurence Sterne, encouraging the famous writer to lobby for the abolition of the slave trade: "That subject, handled in your striking manner, would ease the yoke (perhaps) of many – but if only of one – Gracious God! – what a feast to a benevolent heart!"

The Portrait of a Man in a Red Suit (oil on canvas 61.8 x 51.5 cm, c. 1757–59; in the Royal Albert Memorial Museum, Exeter, Devon) was thought to be Sancho (although it was also previously thought to be of Olaudah Equiano) and was attributed to Allan Ramsay (1713–1784). A full account of the attribution to Ramsay and identification of Sancho is contained in the article "The Lost African" published in Apollo magazine, August 2006. However both the sitter and artist have since been disputed.

Sterne received Sancho's letter in July 1766 shortly after he had finished writing a conversation between his fictional characters Corporal Trim and his brother Tom in Tristram Shandy, wherein Tom described the mistreatment of an African servant in a sausage shop in Lisbon he had visited. Sterne's widely publicised 27 July 1766 response to Sancho's letter became an integral part of 18th-century abolitionist literature.

There is a strange coincidence, Sancho, in the little events (as well as in the great ones) of this world: for I had been writing a tender tale of the sorrows of a friendless poor negro-girl, and my eyes had scarce done smarting with it, when your letter of recommendation in behalf of so many of her brethren and sisters, came to me – but why her brethren? – or your’s, Sancho! any more than mine? It is by the finest tints, and most insensible gradations, that nature descends from the fairest face about St. James’s, to the sootiest complexion in Africa: at which tint of these, is it, that the ties of blood are to cease? and how many shades must we descend lower still in the scale, ’ere mercy is to vanish with them? – but ’tis no uncommon thing, my good Sancho, for one half of the world to use the other half of it like brutes, & then endeavour to make ’em so."

Following the publication of the Sancho-Sterne letters, Sancho became widely known as a man of letters. Sancho, a British subject and voter in Westminster, noted that despite being in the country since the age of two he felt he was "only a lodger, and hardly that". In other writings he described his life: "Went by water – had a coach home – were gazed at – followed, etc. etc. – but not much abused" (that time). On another occasion, he writes: "They stopped us in the town and most generously insulted us."

== Shopkeeper ==
In 1774, with help from Montagu, Sancho, suffering from ill health with gout, opened a grocery shop, offering merchandise such as tobacco, sugar and tea, at 19 Charles Street in Westminster. (Note: This is now a heritage site included in tours of Westminster. The site now houses main building of the Foreign, Commonwealth and Development Office and the facade of the building includes reliefs depicting the liberation of Africa from slavery and a portrait of William Wilberforce.) These were goods then mostly produced by slaves in the West Indies.

Ignatius Sancho is the second known person of African descent to vote in a British general election. As an independent male [sic] (Note: Prior to the Reform Act 1832 women who met the property-holding requirement could in fact vote, so Sancho being male was irrelevant.) property owner, with a house and grocery shop on Charles Street, he had the right to place his vote for the Westminster Members of Parliament in the 1774 and 1780 elections.

— Record of Ignatius Sancho's vote in the general election, October 1774, British Library.

As a shopkeeper Sancho enjoyed more time to socialise, correspond with his many friends, share his enjoyment of literature, and his shop had many visitors. He wrote and published a Theory of Music, though no copy is extant. There are 62 known compositions by Sancho, which were printed in four collections in London between c. 1767 and 1779: Minuets Cotillons & Country Dances, book I (c. 1767), containing 24 dances; A Collection of New Songs (c. 1769), six songs on words of William Shakespeare, David Garrick, Anacreon, and unidentified authors; Minuets, &c., &c., book II (c. 1770), with 20 dances; and Twelve Country Dances for the Year 1779. In addition, he wrote two plays. At this time he also wrote letters and articles for newspapers, under his own name and under the pseudonym "Africanus".

Among his acquaintances were figures such as Thomas Gainsborough, the Shakespearean actor David Garrick, violin virtuoso Felice Giardini, the preacher William Dodd, the sculptor Joseph Nollekens, and the novelist Laurence Sterne. Nollekens gave Sancho a plaster cast of his 1766 marble bust of Sterne. Sancho received many prominent visitors at his shop, including statesman and abolitionist Charles James Fox, who successfully steered a resolution through Parliament pledging it to abolish the slave trade. Fox oversaw a Foreign Slave Trade Bill in spring 1806 that prohibited British subjects from participating in the trading of slaves with the colonies of Britain's wartime enemies, thus eliminating two-thirds of the slave trade passing through British ports. (Note: Charles James Fox was Britain's first foreign secretary (1782, 1783, 1806).)

As a property owner, regardless of his ethnicity, he had the right to vote for Members of Parliament. He voted for the Westminster constituency in the 1774 general election and the 1780 general election. Voting was not secret at the time, and it was recorded that he voted for Hugh Percy and Thomas Pelham-Clinton in 1774, and for George Brydges Rodney and Charles James Fox in 1780. He is the second person of African origin known to have voted in Britain after victualler John London.

== Death ==
Ignatius Sancho died from the effects of gout on 14 December 1780 and was buried on 17 December in the burial area of St Margaret's, Westminster (now the site of Christchurch Gardens, Victoria Street, London). There is no memorial marker at the church, as the grave stones (which lie flat) in the churchyard were covered over with grass in 1880 and no inscription was found for him when a record was made of the existing epitaphs. He was the first person of African descent known to be given an obituary in the British press.

== Letters of the Late Ignatius Sancho ==
While his correspondence often included domestic issues, it also commented on the political and literary life in 18th-century Britain. One of his more famous series of letters includes his eye-witness accounts of the Gordon Riots in June 1780. The angry mob passed outside his shop on Charles Street. Beginning as a Protestant protest against parliamentary extension of Catholic enfranchisement, it grew into a violent mob of 100,000 looting and burning parts of London. He wrote:

There is at this present moment at least a hundred thousand poor, miserable, ragged rabble, from 12 to 60 years of age, with blue cockades in their hats – besides half as many women and children, all parading the streets, the bridge, the park, ready for any and every mischief. Gracious God! What's the matter now? I was obliged to leave off – the shouts of the mob, the horrid clashing of swords, and the clutter of a multitude in swiftest motion drew me to the door, when everyone in the street was employed in shutting up shop. It is now just five o'clock – the ballad-singers are exhasting their musical talents with the downfall of Popery, S-h and N-h, Lord S-h narrowly escaped with his life about an hour since' the mob seized his chariot going to the house, broke his glasses and, in struggling to get his lordship out, they somehow have cut his face.

In 1782 Frances Crewe, a correspondent of Sancho's, arranged for 160 of his letters to be published in the form of two volumes entitled The Letters of the Late Ignatius Sancho, an African. The book sold very well, with more than 2,000 subscribing to it. His widow received in royalties more than £500, equivalent to £74,275 in 2025. Joseph Jekyll provided a memoir of Sancho for the first edition, and four more editions were issued by 1803.

Sancho's son, William Leach Osborne Sancho, inherited the shop on Charles Street and transformed it into a printing and book-selling business. In 1803 at this shop he printed a fifth edition of Letters of the Late Ignatius Sancho with Memoirs of His Life by Joseph Jekyll, with a frontispiece engraving by Bartolozzi.

In a letter Sancho sent on 1 April 1779 to William Stevenson he wrote: "I am Sir an Affrican – with two ffs – if you please – & proud am I to be of a country that knows no politicians – nor lawyers – [...] –nor thieves of any denomination save Natural...."

Sancho was unusually blunt in his response to a letter from Jack Wingrave, John Wingrave's son. Jack wrote about his negative reaction to people of colour based on his own experience in India during the 1770s. Sancho's response was:

I am sorry to observe that the practice of your country (which as a resident I love – and for its freedom – and for the many blessings I enjoy in it – shall ever have my warmest wishes, prayers and blessings); I say it is with reluctance, that I must observe your country's conduct has been uniformly wicked in the East – West-Indies – and even on the coast of Guinea. The grand object of English navigators – indeed of all Christian navigators – is money – money – money – for which I do not pretend to blame them – Commerce was meant by the goodness of the Deity to diffuse the various goods of the earth into every part – to unite mankind in the blessed chains of brotherly love – society – and mutual dependence: the enlightened Christian should diffuse the riches of the Gospel of peace – with the commodities of his respective land – Commerce attended with strict honesty – and with Religion for its companion – would be a blessing to every shore it touched at. In Africa, the poor wretched natives blessed with the most fertile and luxuriant soil – are rendered so much the more miserable for what Providence meant as a blessing: the Christians' abominable traffic for slaves and the horrid cruelty and treachery of the petty Kings encouraged by their Christian customers who carry them strong liquors to enflame their national madness – and powder – and bad fire-arms – to furnish them with the hellish means of killing and kidnapping.

== Legacy ==
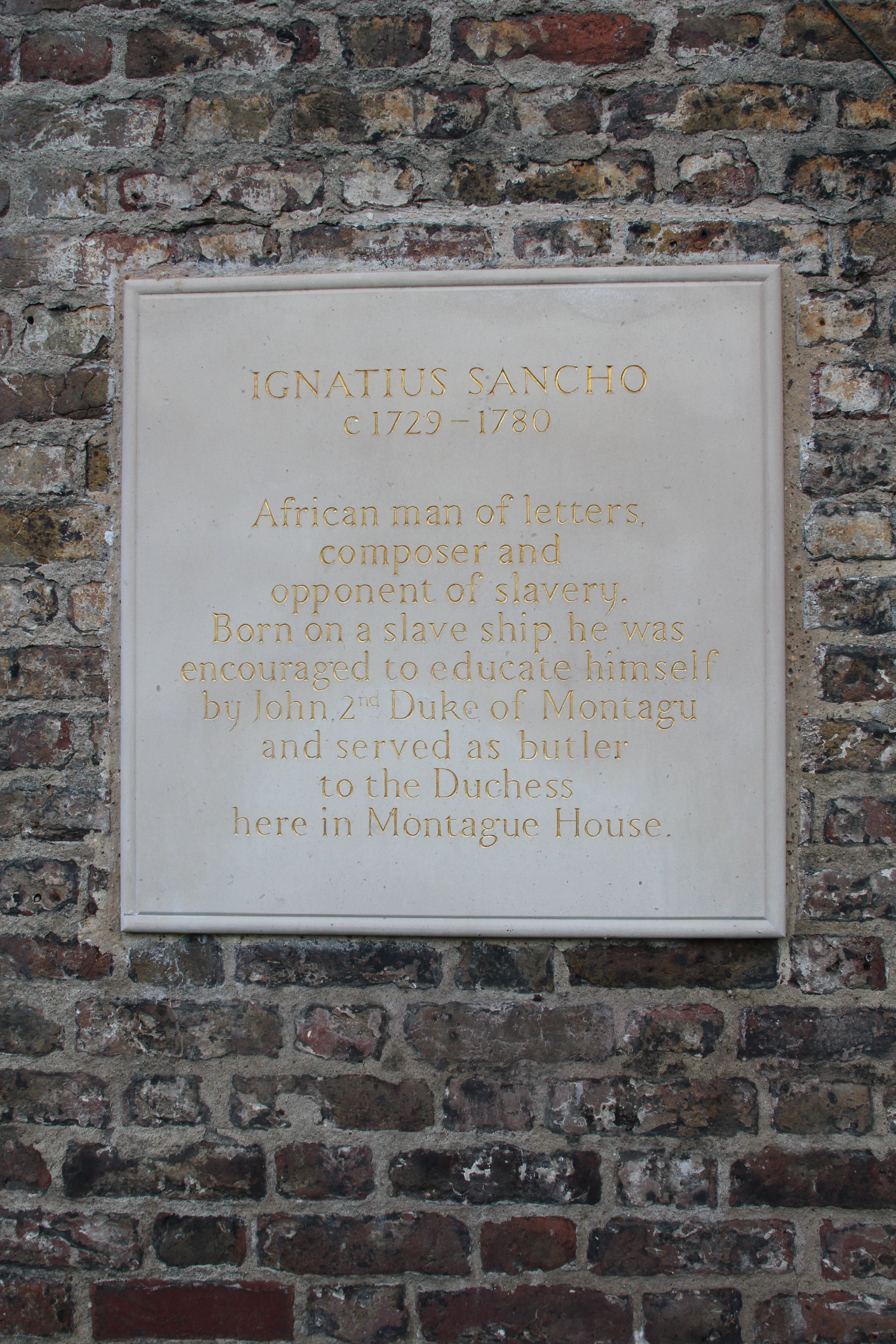
Plaque in Greenwich Park, London

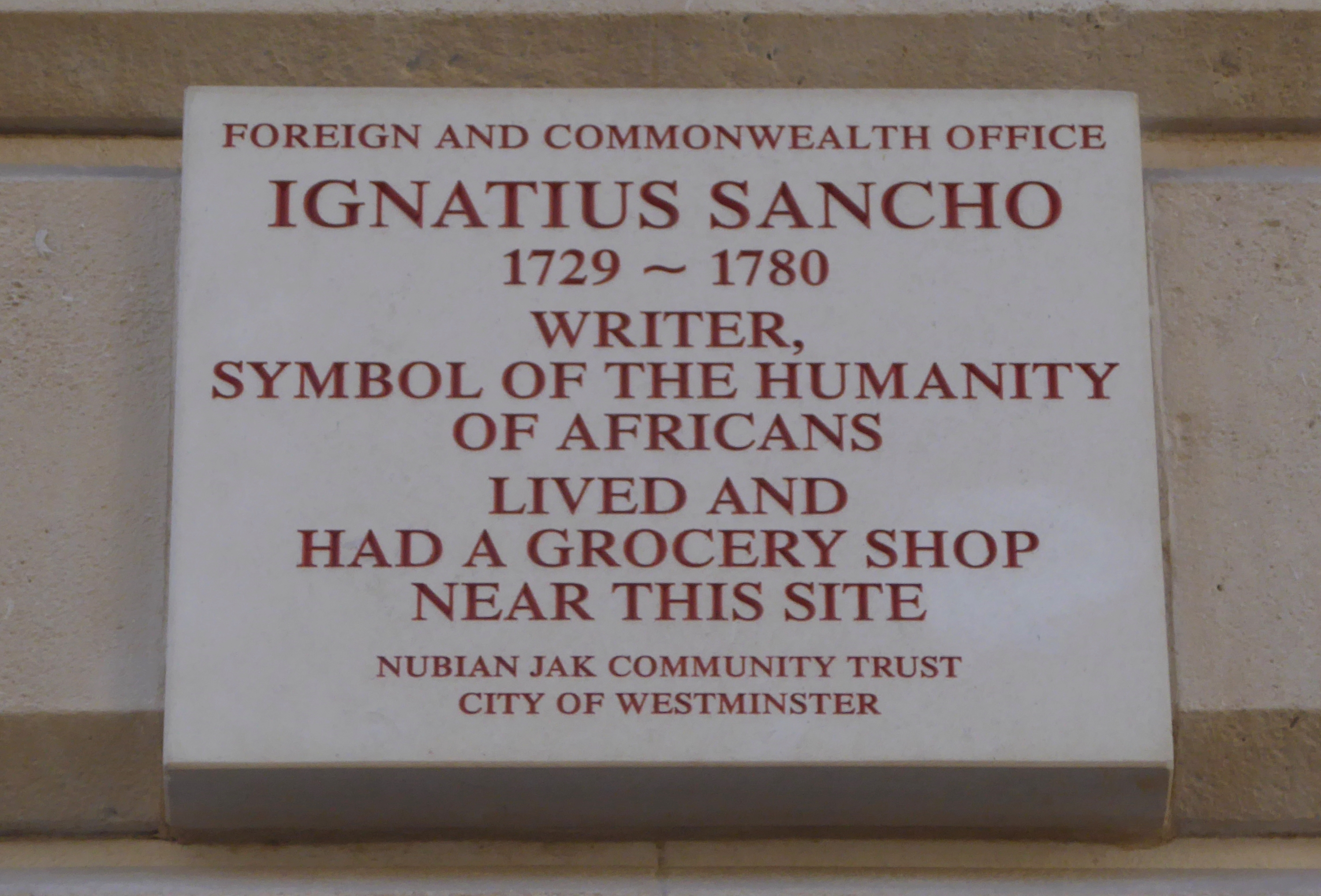
Plaque in King Charles Street, City of Westminster, London marking the location of Sancho's grocery store

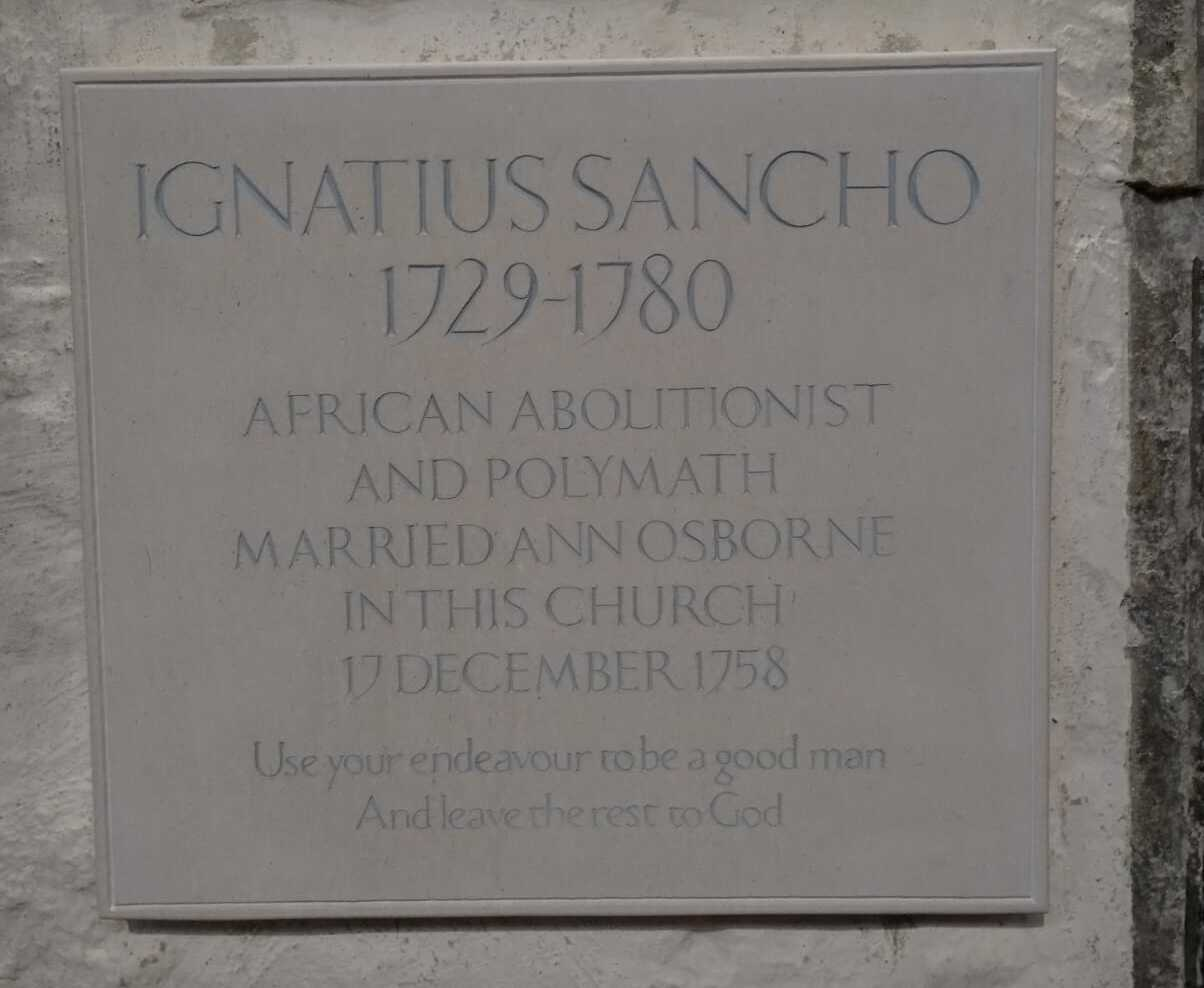
Memorial stone in St Margaret's church, Westminster

- A plaque to the memory of Sancho was unveiled on 15 June 2007, by Nick Raynsford, MP for Greenwich, on the remaining wall of Montagu House on the south-west boundary of Greenwich Park. The plaque was funded by the Friends of Greenwich Park to commemorate the bicentenary of the Abolition of the Slave Trade Act, made law in 1807. A second plaque to his memory is on the Foreign and Commonwealth Office. Also in Greenwich Park, on 13 March 2024, a refurbished building was opened as the Ignatius Sancho Café.
- When the City of Westminster commemorated the bicentenary by creating a walking tour of Westminster highlighting events and individuals involved in the campaign to abolish the slave trade, they included 19 Charles Street. This was a collaboration with historian S. I. Martin, the National Gallery, the National Portrait Gallery, London, the Palace of Westminster, Tate Britain, Westminster City Archives, and Westminster City Council.
- Sancho was commemorated on a 2007 postage stamp issued by the Royal Mail in recognition of his work as an abolitionist.
- Sancho named as one of the "100 Great Black Britons".
- In 2015, a play based on the life of Sancho, entitled Sancho: An Act of Remembrance and written and performed by Paterson Joseph, was staged at Oxford and Birmingham, and at the Brooklyn Academy of Music in New York. From 4 to 16 June 2018 the play had its London premiere at Wilton's Music Hall.
- On 1 October 2020, during British Black History Month, Google honoured Sancho with a Doodle.
- Paterson Joseph's 2022 novel The Secret Diaries of Charles Ignatius Sancho won the Royal Society of Literature's Christopher Bland Prize.
- Ignatius Sancho appears as a main character in the graphic novel La pièce manquante ("The Missing Play", 2023) by Jean Harambat. As actress Peg Woffington's close friend and manager, Sancho interests her in William Shakespeare's missing play The History of Cardenio, purportedly based on an episode of Miguel de Cervantes's Don Quixote, then joins her in a quest to find it. The scenes highlight the coincidence between Sancho's last name and Don Quixote's squire's.
- On 19 December 2023 a stone memorial was unveiled at St Margaret's Church, Westminster, where Ignatius and Ann Sancho were married in 1758.

== See also ==
- Black British elite, the class that Sancho belonged to
- Joseph Antonio Emidy, perhaps the first black English composer (1775–1835)
- George Bridgetower, virtuoso violinist (1778–1860)
- Samuel Coleridge-Taylor, black English composer (1875–1912) best known for his trilogy of cantatas The Song of Hiawatha
- Chevalier de Saint-Georges
- List of slaves
