= Piran Bishop =

English painter

Piran Bishop (born 1961) is a British portraitist.

== Early career ==
Bishop is based in Exeter, and studied at Art Colleges in Exeter and Brighton. He was sketched by Robert Lenkiewicz as a child, and became a "casual student" of his from 1994 until Lenkiewicz's death in 2002. Bishop is the subject of several portraits by Lenkiewicz.

Before settling to a career as a portraitist, Bishop worked for Exeter City Council as a local archaeological and architectural illustrator; some of his sketches are still used by the City Council as educational and reference materials.

== Portraits ==
Bishop usually works in oil on canvas.

Commercial commissions include a series of eight portraits of adult learners for Ufi/learndirect, painted between January and March 2001. Bishop described the series as his "biggest project to date".

Some of Bishop's private commissions can be seen on his website.

== Exhibitions ==
Bishop has exhibited at the Mall Galleries in London and at several South-West galleries, including The Royal Albert Memorial Museum and Art Gallery, and the Coombe Farm Gallery. His work is also exhibited at the Form Contemporary Craft Gallery in Blaenavon.
