= Gala Day at Newlyn =

Painting by Stanhope Forbes

- Artist: Stanhope Forbes
- Year: 1907
- Type: Oil on canvas, genre painting
- Dimensions: 106 cm × 136 cm (42 in × 54 in)
- Location: Hartlepool Art Gallery, County Durham

Gala Day at Newlyn is a 1907 oil painting by the Irish-born British artist Stanhope Forbes. It depicts a gala being held in the fishing port of Newlyn in Cornwall. The annual gala featured a procession through the streets on Whit Monday. Forbes was a key figure in the British Impresisonist movement and a founder of the Newlyn School, which blended elements of Impressionism with Realism.

Today the painting is in the collection of Hartlepool Art Gallery, having been acquired in 1920.

== Bibliography ==
- Cherry, Deborah & Beckett, Jane. The Edwardian Era. Phaidon and Barbican Art Gallery, 1987.
- Hind, Charles Lewis. Stanhope A. Forbes, Royal Academician. Virtue, 1911.
- Holt, Ysanne. British Artists and the Modernist Landscape. Taylor & Francis, 2018.
- McConkey, Kenneth. Impressionism in Britain. Yale University Press, 1995.
