= Seth William Stevenson =

English antiquarian

- Born: 1784; Norwich
- Died: 22 December 1853 (aged 68–69); Cambridge
- Occupation: Antiquarian

Seth William Stevenson (1784 – 22 December 1853) was an English antiquarian.

== Biography ==
William, was taken into partnership with his father, William Stevenson, and Jonathan Matchett. From an early period he was connected with the ‘Norfolk Chronicle,’ of which paper, on the death of his father, he became proprietor, and to a great extent editor to his death. In 1817, he printed for private circulation ‘Journal of a Tour through part of France, Flanders, and Holland, including a visit to Paris and a walk over the Field of Waterloo in the summer of 1816.’ This work was dedicated to the Society of United Friars of Norwich, a literary society of which he was almost the last survivor. In 1827, he published in two volumes ‘A Tour in France, Savoy, Northern Italy, Switzerland, Germany, and the Netherlands,’ and in the same year was elected a fellow of the Society of Antiquaries. In 1828, he was nominated a sheriff of the city of Norwich, became an alderman in the same year, and served the office of mayor in 1832. He was elected an associate of the British Archæological Association in 1845, and on the establishment of the Numismatic Society in 1836 he became a member. For many years all his leisure time was engaged in composing a complete dictionary of Roman coins. His idea was to give an explanation of the types, symbols, and devices on consular and imperial coins, biographical notices of the emperors from Julius to Mauricius, and mythological, historical, and geographical notices in elucidation of rare coins. This work, with illustrations by Frederick William Fairholt, was left incomplete at the time of his death, as to the last letters U to Z. It was then revised in part by Charles Roach Smith, and, being completed by Frederic William Madden, was published, after many delays, in 1889 under the title of ‘A Dictionary of Roman Coins, Republican and Imperial,’ and remains the standard work on the subject. Stevenson died at Cambridge on 22 December 1853, in the house of his son-in-law, John Deighton, surgeon.

By his wife Mary, he had two sons, of whom Mr. Henry Stevenson, F.L.S., is author of ‘The Birds of Norfolk’ (1866–90, 3 vols. 8vo).
