= Robert Lenkiewicz =

English painter

- Born: Robert Oscar Lenkiewicz; 31 December 1941; London, England
- Died: 5 August 2002 (aged 60); Plymouth, England
- Education: Royal Academy
- Known for: Painting

"Cockney Jim Waiting For Miss Lesley Miller on the Barbican." 40x30cm oil on canvas piece from Lenkiewicz's Love and Romance project (16–31 October 1975)

Robert Oscar Lenkiewicz (31 December 1941 – 5 August 2002) was one of South West England's most celebrated artists of modern times. Perennially unfashionable in high art circles, his work was nevertheless popular with the public. Lenkiewicz is regarded by some as a great painter who is 'finally being recognised as such after all these years of neglect by the art establishment, particularly by London, who would never have him. He didn't play the game as far as London commercial galleries were concerned. He did his own thing out in the provinces, which was looked down upon.'

He produced as many as 10,000 works (though this figure includes his prolific output as a pencil portrait artist), often on a large scale, and in themed 'projects' investigating hidden communities (Vagrancy 1973, Mental Handicap 1976) or difficult social issues (Suicide 1980, Death 1982).

In 1981, he faked his death, announcing his demise to the local newspapers. When Lenkiewicz died in 2002, he left behind a particularly macabre legacy as the embalmed body of one of his friends, a tramp named Diogenes, was found in the cupboard section at the bottom of a bookcase. Lenkiewicz had promised his friend that he would preserve his body when he died rather than allow him to be buried. Another corpse, that of a 16th century midwife who was hanged for witchcraft, was found in the same room, which Lenkiewicz termed his "death room".

The Lenkiewicz Foundation (educational charity) was established in 1997, received the bequest of the painter's remaining collection of works. The artist's voluminous diaries, illustrated notebooks and relationship journals are in the Foundation's collection, which was shown at Plymouth City Museum and Art Gallery in 2009. The Foundation has curated a number of posthumous exhibitions: Self-Portraits 1956-2002 at the Ben Uri Gallery, Jewish Museum of Art in London in 2008; Lenkiewicz: The Legacy – Works from The Lenkiewicz Foundation Collection at Plymouth City Museum and Art Gallery in 2009; Still Lives at the Royal West of England Academy in Bristol in 2011; Death and the Maiden at Torre Abbey, in Torquay later that year; and Human, All Too Human at the Royal William Yard in the artist's adopted city of Plymouth in 2012. This exhibition, in expanded form, travelled to Germany (Spinnerei in Leipzig and AufAEG in Nuremberg) in 2013, where it became the first overseas exhibition of the artist's work to date.

== Early life ==
Robert Lenkiewicz was born in London in 1941, the son of refugees who ran a Jewish hotel in Fordwych Road. Robert Lenkiewicz spent his boyhood in the Hotel Shemtov in Cricklewood, which was run by his parents. His mother was a German baroness and his father a Polish horse breeder who both fled Nazi Germany in 1939 and arrived in London as penniless refugees. Lenkiewicz frequently stated in interview that the hotel's elderly residents included Holocaust survivors but this is contradicted by the artist's brother John, who recollects that the residents tended to be the parents or grandparents of 2nd or 3rd generation English Jews (for instance, the mother of popular entertainer Dickie Valentine), though the hotel's Czechoslovak cook, Mrs Bobek, was a survivor of the Bergen-Belsen concentration camp. Nevertheless, the loneliness and suffering the young painter witnessed at the hotel was "salutary and thought-provoking" according to Lenkiewicz. Lenkiewicz was inspired to paint after seeing Charles Laughton in Alexander Korda's biographical film Rembrandt. He attended Sir Christopher Wren junior technical school of art architecture and building from 1955 to 1958 graduating in art with distinction. At 16, Lenkiewicz was accepted at Saint Martin's School of Art and later attended the Royal Academy. However, he was virtually impervious to contemporary art fashions, being more interested in his favourite paintings in the National Gallery.

Inspired by the example of Albert Schweitzer, Lenkiewicz threw open the doors of his studios to anyone in need of a roof – down and outs, addicts, criminals and the mentally ill congregated there. These individuals were the subjects of his paintings as a young man. However, such colourful characters were not welcomed by his neighbours and he was obliged to leave London in 1964.

== Move to Plymouth ==
He spent a year living in a remote cottage near Lanreath in Cornwall, supporting his young family by teaching, before being offered studio space on the Barbican in Plymouth by local artist and businessman John Nash. The artist's home and studios once more became a magnet for vagrants and street alcoholics, who then sat for paintings. Their numbers swelled and Lenkiewicz was forced to commandeer derelict warehouses in the city to house the 'dossers'. One of these warehouses also served as a studio and in 1973 became the exhibition space for the Vagrancy Project.

He first came to public attention when the media highlighted his giant mural on Plymouth's Barbican in the 1970s. Another furore occurred in 1981 when he faked his own death in preparation for the forthcoming project on the theme of Death (1982): "I could not know what it was like to be dead," said the artist, "but I could discover what it was like to be thought dead."

== Later life and death ==
After his first exhibition with an established art dealer in the 1990s, Lenkiewicz's work enjoyed growing commercial success and some recognition by the establishment. He received a major retrospective in 1997 at Plymouth City Museum and Art Gallery, attended by 42,000 visitors. In his obituary of Lenkiewicz, art critic David Lee observed: "Robert's greatest gift was to show us that an artist could be genuinely concerned about social and domestic issues and attempt the difficult task of expressing this conscience through the deeply unfashionable medium of figurative painting. In that sense, he was one of few serious painters of contemporary history." Lenkiewicz, aged 60, died of a heart attack in 2002. Despite his prolific output, he had only £12 cash in his possession (allegedly having never opened a bank account), and owed £2 million to various creditors. Since his death, examples of his best paintings have fetched six figure sums in London auction rooms.

The rise in Lenkiewicz's popularity was shown in the estate auctions of his personal collection of his own works. At Sotheby's in 2003, Bearnes 2004 and 2008, his paintings and private library raised £2.1 million.

A number of myths have arisen surrounding the artist's unusual barter economics, such as that Lenkiewicz never paid tax or kept any records of sales of his works; indeed, it is sometimes claimed that he never sold his work at all despite all his exhibition lists now in the public domain bearing prices. It is the case, however, that Lenkiewicz operated a system of patronage whereby a long-term collector or interested buyer would be handed a bill or two to be settled on behalf of the painter. This system operated until the mid-1990s, when the artist began to regularize his financial affairs in negotiation with the HMRC. Subsequent to the painter's death in 2002, media reports put the value of the artist's estate as £6.5 million. This figure included a cursory valuation of the artist's antiquarian library of rare books on witchcraft, the occult, metaphysics and medieval philosophy. However, the sale of this entire collection by Sotheby's in 2003 raised less than £1 million.

== Personal life ==
Lenkiewicz was the father of 12 children, some of whom have become artists in their own right. One of Robert's sons, Reuben Lenkiewicz, runs a gallery in Ashburton dedicated to his father's work. The artist provided free lessons in techniques for figurative painting to anyone with aptitude and dedication. Lenkiewicz's pupils include Piran Bishop, Yana Travail, Dan Wheatley, Louise Courtnell, Lisa Stokes, Nahem Shoa, James Guy Eccleston, Joe Stoneman and Mark Fielding.

His step-daughter, with Celia Mills, is playwright Rebecca Lenkiewicz.

== Vagrancy Project ==
The Vagrancy Project consisted of several dozen paintings and drawings of vagrants and a large book of notes written by the dossers themselves and those involved in their 'care' and control. Lenkiewicz hoped that the exhibition, and the down and outs' own stories, would illuminate the plight of these 'invisible people' and galvanise the community into humane action on their behalf. The format of the 'Project' – combining thematically linked paintings with the publication of research notes and the collected observations of the sitters – was to be used consistently throughout Lenkiewicz's career. Projects such as Mental Handicap (1976), Old Age (1979) and Death (1982) followed the one on vagrancy as Lenkiewicz continued to examine the lives of ostracised, hidden sections of the community and bring them to the attention of the general public.

The Paul Downes song "Robert and the Cowboys" was inspired by the project and describes a number of the vagrants.

== Other projects ==
In a parallel line of inquiry, Lenkiewicz also investigated some of society's most persistent taboos in projects such as Jealousy (1977), Orgasm (1978), Suicide (1980) and Sexual Behaviour (1983). Here, Lenkiewicz often adopted an allegorical pictorial style to portray human physiology in extremis. Lenkiewicz came to the conclusion that the kinds of sensations people felt when a lover abandoned them or when their cherished beliefs were threatened were identical in kind to the 'withdrawal symptoms' and anxieties experienced by addicts or alcoholics over their preferred narcotic. These projects thus became an extended study in 'addictive behaviour' (the title of his 20th, unfinished, project).

The conclusions drawn from his own observations were supported by his private library, which he viewed as a history of 'fanatical belief systems'. Lenkiewicz contended that in the absence of any good reasons for our beliefs or emotions we must always look to human physiology for an explanation of fanatical or obsessive behaviour and that it is there that we shall discover the roots of fascism – the tendency to treat another person as property.

On and off, for nearly 30 years, he worked on his masterpiece, the Riddle Mural in the Round Room at Port Eliot house, home of the Earl of St. Germans, but died before its completion. Half of the mural, in the 40-foot-diameter (12 m) room, shows death, destruction, insanity, unrequited love, and the apocalyptic end of the world. The other half reflects love and affection, friendships, harmony, proportion and consensus. Hidden in the work are various references to family skeletons, art history and cabalistic mysteries, hence the name – the Riddle Mural.

== Library ==
Over forty years Lenkiewicz built up a library of some 25,000 volumes devoted to art, the occult sciences, demonolatry, magic, philosophy, especially metaphysics, alchemy, death, psychology and sexuality, preoccupations which surface in some of his paintings. His collection of books on magic and witchcraft was one of the finest in private hands and was largely sold at Sotheby's in 2003, and a substantial part of the remainder of his library was sold at auction in May 2007 by Lyon & Turnbull.
