= Hartlepool Art Gallery =

Art gallery in Hartlepool, England

Coordinates: 54.6857°N 1.2096°W

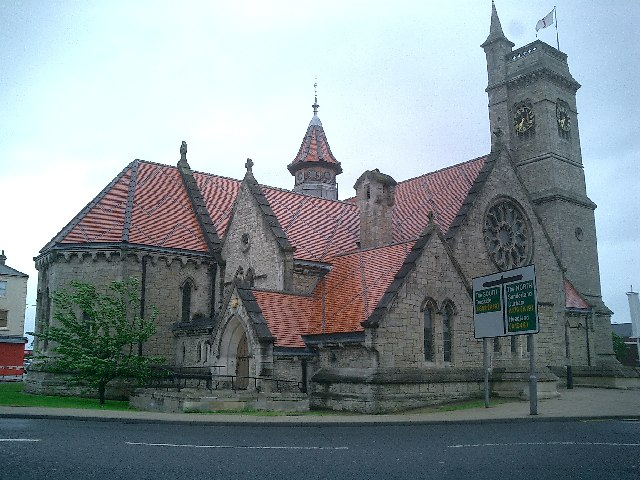
Christ Church, Hartlepool, now Hartlepool Art Gallery

Hartlepool Art Gallery is an art gallery in Hartlepool, County Durham, England.

The gallery opened in 1996. It is in Church Square within Christ Church, a restored Victorian church, built in 1854 and designed by the architect Edward Buckton Lamb (1806–1869). The building has a 100-foot tower with six bells, which can still be rung.

Hartlepool Art Gallery is co-located with a tourist information centre close to Hartlepool railway station and the town centre. The temporary exhibition programme includes crafts, contemporary and fine art, and photography. There is also a permanent collection. The gallery is run by Hartlepool Borough Council.

The collection of Hartlepool Art gallery includes around 1,500 works, including oil paintings, watercolours, prints and sculpture. Artists represented include Lucian Freud, John Wilson McCracken, Frank Henry Mason, Alice Nicholson, Basil Beattie, Henriëtte Ronner-Knip, Nahem Shoa, Frank Auerbach and Frederic Shields. The collection of watercolours and drawings includes works by Myles Birket Foster, Stanley Spencer and L. S. Lowry.

The gallery presented the first exhibition of Lucian Freud outside London in 1972. It was arranged by the local artist John Wilson McCracken, who had become friends with Freud when he lived in London.

== Gallery ==
Henry I Receiving News of the Drowning of His Son by Solomon Hart, 1840

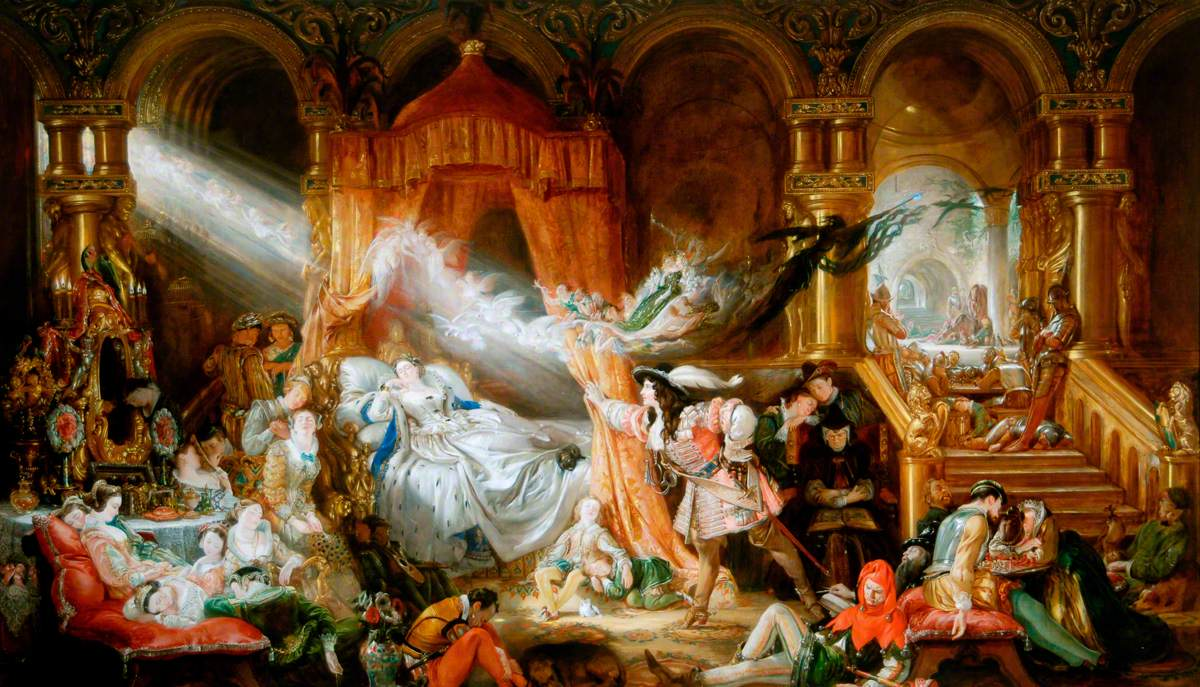
The Sleeping Beauty by Daniel Maclise, 1841

Charles I Bidding Goodbye to His Children by Charles Lucy, 1850

Shipping off West Hartlepool by John Wilson Carmichael, 1867

Gala Day at Newlyn by Stanhope Forbes, 1907

== See also ==
- List of museums in County Durham
