= Portrait of a Man in a Red Suit =

18th-century oil painting

- Portrait of an African
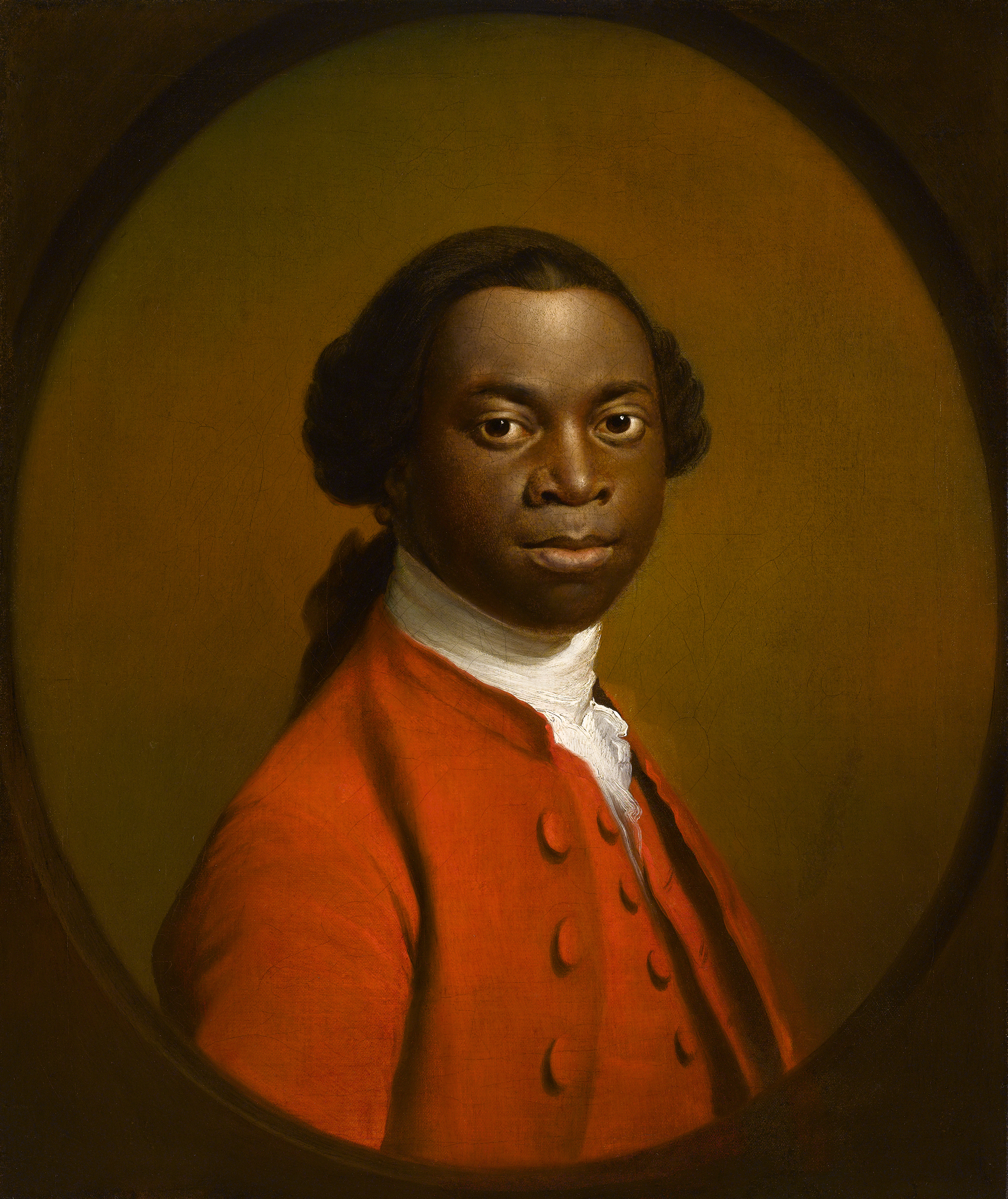
- Artist: Unknown
- Year: c. 18th century
- Medium: oil paint, canvas
- Dimensions: 61.8 cm (24.3 in) × 51.5 cm (20.3 in)
- Location: Royal Albert Memorial Museum, Exeter, Devon
- Owner: Percy Moore Turner
- Accession: 14/1943

Portrait of a Man in a Red Suit (formerly known as Portrait of an African) is an 18th-century oil painting of a black man donated to the Royal Albert Memorial Museum by art dealer Percy Moore Turner in 1943. The artist and sitter are unknown.

The earliest provenance is a sale by Christie's in 1931. From 2006 until June 2023, it was attributed to Allan Ramsay, created c. 1757–1760 and believed to be of a young Ignatius Sancho. Before that, it was proposed in the 1960s to have depicted Olaudah Equiano and to have been painted by Joshua Reynolds c. 1780 with the title Portrait of a Negro Man. Historian Stephen Davidson claimed that the painting depicts Thomas Peters during his 1791 visit to London, adding that it was the only portrait of a Black Loyalist known to exist. The painting featured as part of the "Art Everywhere" initiative in the UK in August 2013.
