= William Stevenson (publisher) =

English publisher and author

William Stevenson (1741–1821) was an English publisher and writer.

== Life ==
The eldest son of the Rev. Seth Ellis Stevenson, rector of Treswell, Nottinghamshire, William Stevenson was a printer and publisher at the firm being Stevenson, Matchett, & Stevenson in the marketplace of Norwich. For 35 years (from 1785 or 1786 onward) he was the proprietor of the Norfolk Chronicle.

Stevenson contributed to John Nichols's Literary Anecdotes and to the Gentleman's Magazine. He was a fellow of the Society of Antiquaries of London. He died in Surrey Street, Norwich, on 13 May 1821. The antiquary Seth William Stevenson was his son.

== Publications ==
In 1812 Stevenson manufactured with his own press a new edition of James Bentham's History of the Church of Ely. In 1817 he published a Supplement to this work. William Stevenson also edited John Campbell's Lives of the British Admirals, updating to 1812 the information contained in it.

== Notes ==
Attribution

This article incorporates text from a publication now in the public domain: Lee, Sidney, ed. (1898). "Stevenson, Seth William". Dictionary of National Biography. Vol. 54. London: Smith, Elder & Co.
