= Royal Albert Memorial Museum =

Museum in Exeter, Devon, England

Coordinates: 50.725111°N 3.532306°W

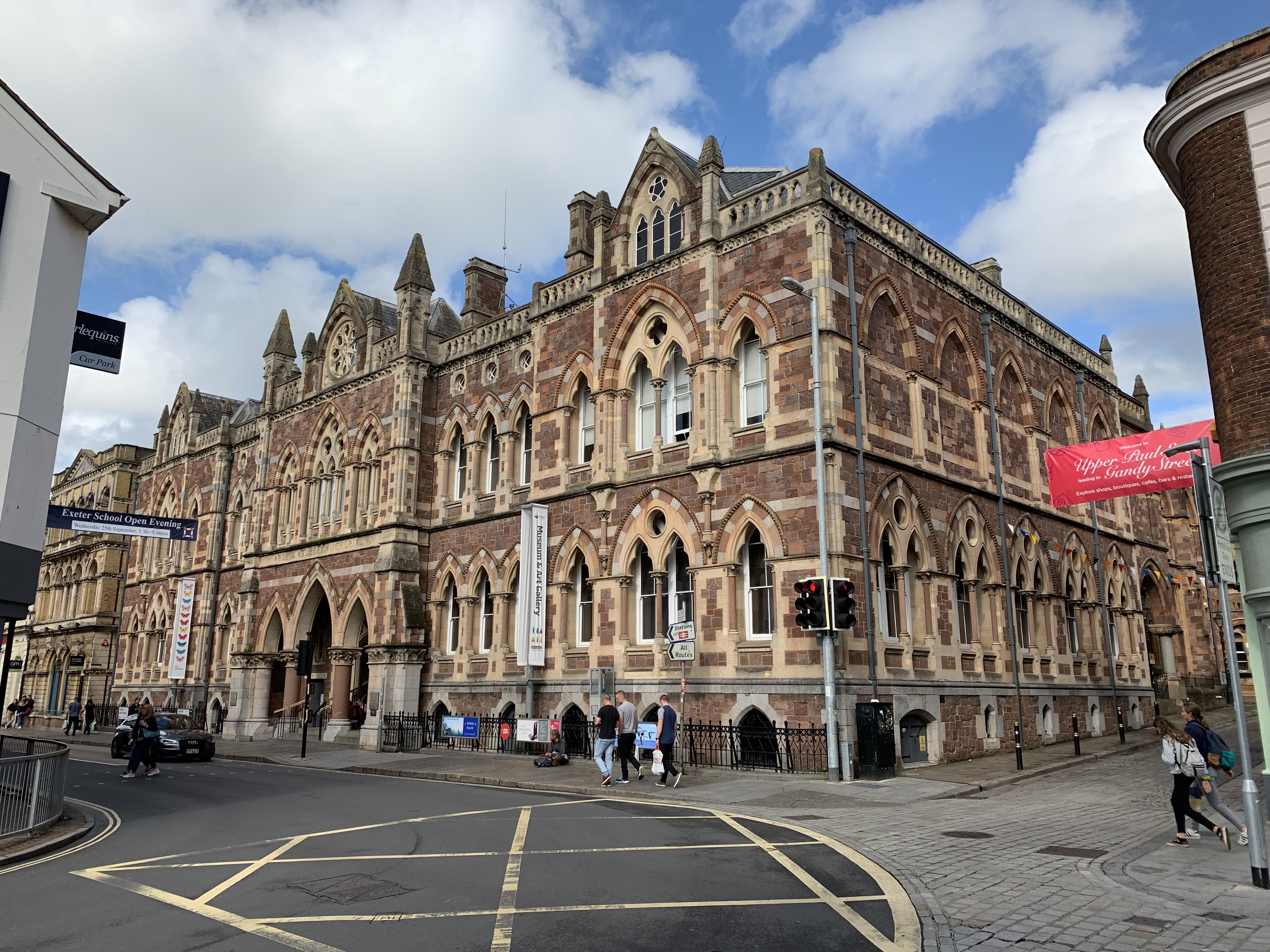
- The Royal Albert Memorial Museum
- Interactive fullscreen map
- Established: 1868; 158 years ago
- Location: Queen Street, Exeter, England
- Visitors: 340,000 (2012)
- Website: www.rammuseum.org.uk

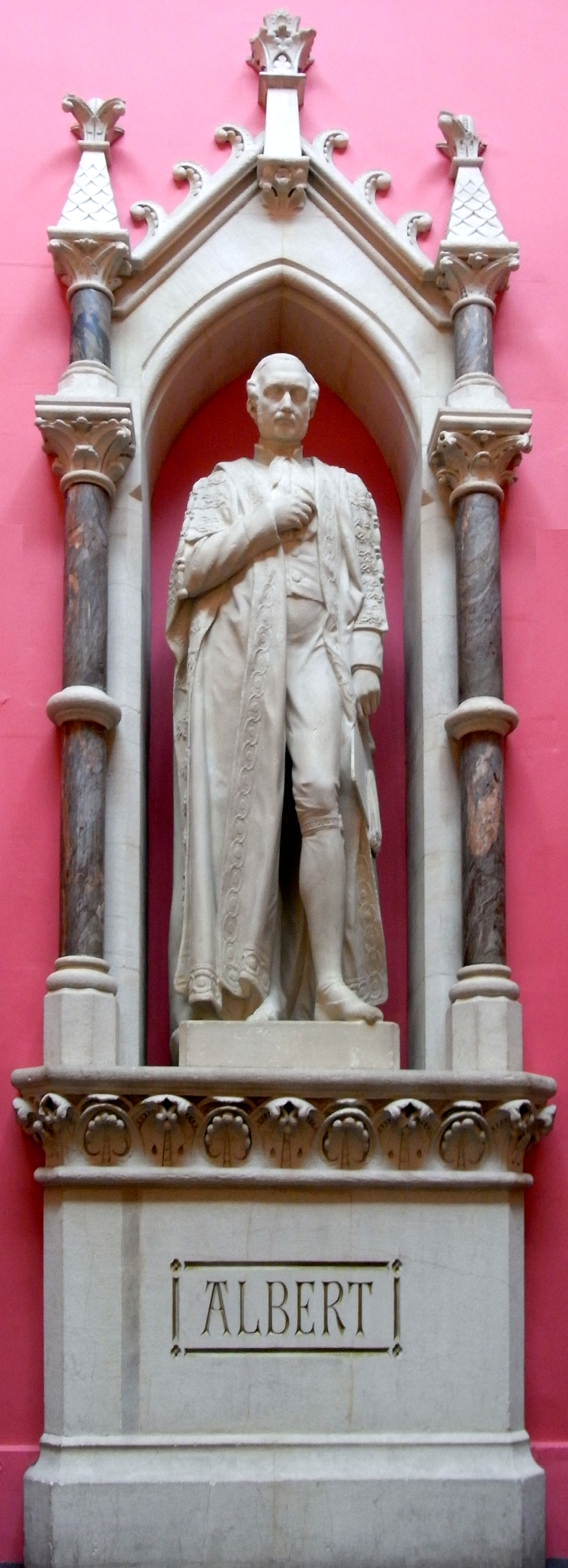
Prince Albert sculpted by Devon-born Edward Bowring Stephens (1815–1882), main staircase of Royal Albert Memorial Museum. Inscribed on base: "E B Stephens ARA 1868". Stephens gave his labour gratis and was a benefactor of the museum and had been a promoter of its predecessor

Royal Albert Memorial Museum & Art Gallery (RAMM) is a museum and art gallery in Exeter, Devon, the largest in the city. It holds significant and diverse collections in areas such as zoology, anthropology, fine art, local and foreign archaeology and geology.

Altogether the RAMM holds over one million objects, of which a small percentage are on permanent public display. It is a National Portfolio Organisation under the Arts Council England-administered programme of strategic investment, which means it received funding from 2012 to 2015 to develop its services.

Founded in 1868, the RAMM is housed in a Gothic Revival building of local New Red Sandstone that has undergone several extensions. It most recently reopened on 15 December 2011 after a redevelopment lasting four years and costing £24M, and has since received numerous awards.

== History ==
=== Establishment and early period ===
The site for the museum was donated by Richard Sommers Gard, MP for Exeter from 1857 to 1864, and a competition for its design attracted twenty-four entries, including one from John Hayward, whose gothic design was the winner. His original plan called for a tall central tower like that at the Oxford University Museum of Natural History, but that feature was rejected and was replaced by a gable and rose window.

Initially proposed by Sir Stafford Northcote as a practical memorial to Prince Albert, an appeal fund was launched in 1861. John Gendall volunteered to curate an initial collection required to fill the planned building. and the first phases of the building were completed by 1868. RAMM was the birthplace for much of Exeter's cultural life: the university, central library and college of art all had their origins in what became known as RAMM. The Devon and Exeter Albert Memorial, as it was originally known, provided an integrated museum, art gallery, free library, reading room, school of art and school of engineering in the manner long advocated by Prince Albert.

Its contents soon outgrew the building, necessitating the construction of extensions in 1894 (by Medley Fulford) and in 1898 (by Tait and Harvey). This second extension, the York Wing, was opened by the Duke and Duchess of York, later King George V and Queen Mary, and at the same time the title of "Royal" was granted and so from that date the name Royal Albert Memorial Museum was used. Over the course of time locals adopted the abbreviation "RAMM", and this in turn became the name by which the museum is branded.

For many years the museum changed little after that construction period, although the city library moved out of RAMM in 1930, the school of science ultimately developed into the University of Exeter and the school of art became what is now the University of Plymouth's Faculty of Art & Education, formerly Exeter College of Art and Design. Over time RAMM gradually expanded to fill the whole building.

=== Modernity ===
Between 2007 and 2011 a major redevelopment was completed costing £24 million. Designed by architects Allies and Morrison, it included repair to the fabric of the building, refurbishment, a complete redisplay of the collections, an extension and a new entrance from the historic Registered gardens at the rear. The Heritage Lottery Fund contributed nearly £10 million of the cost. An off-site collections store called the Ark was also built and fitted. The RAMM reopened on 15 December 2011, and is free to visit from 10am to 5pm every day except Mondays and bank holidays. In 2024, RAMM announced its open access strategy making their public domain collections available to everyone aiming to ensure the wider public awareness and long-term preservation of RAMM's collections.

== Collections ==
Four major collection areas are represented: antiquities, art, natural history and world cultures. The world cultures collections are designated as being of national and international significance by the UK government.

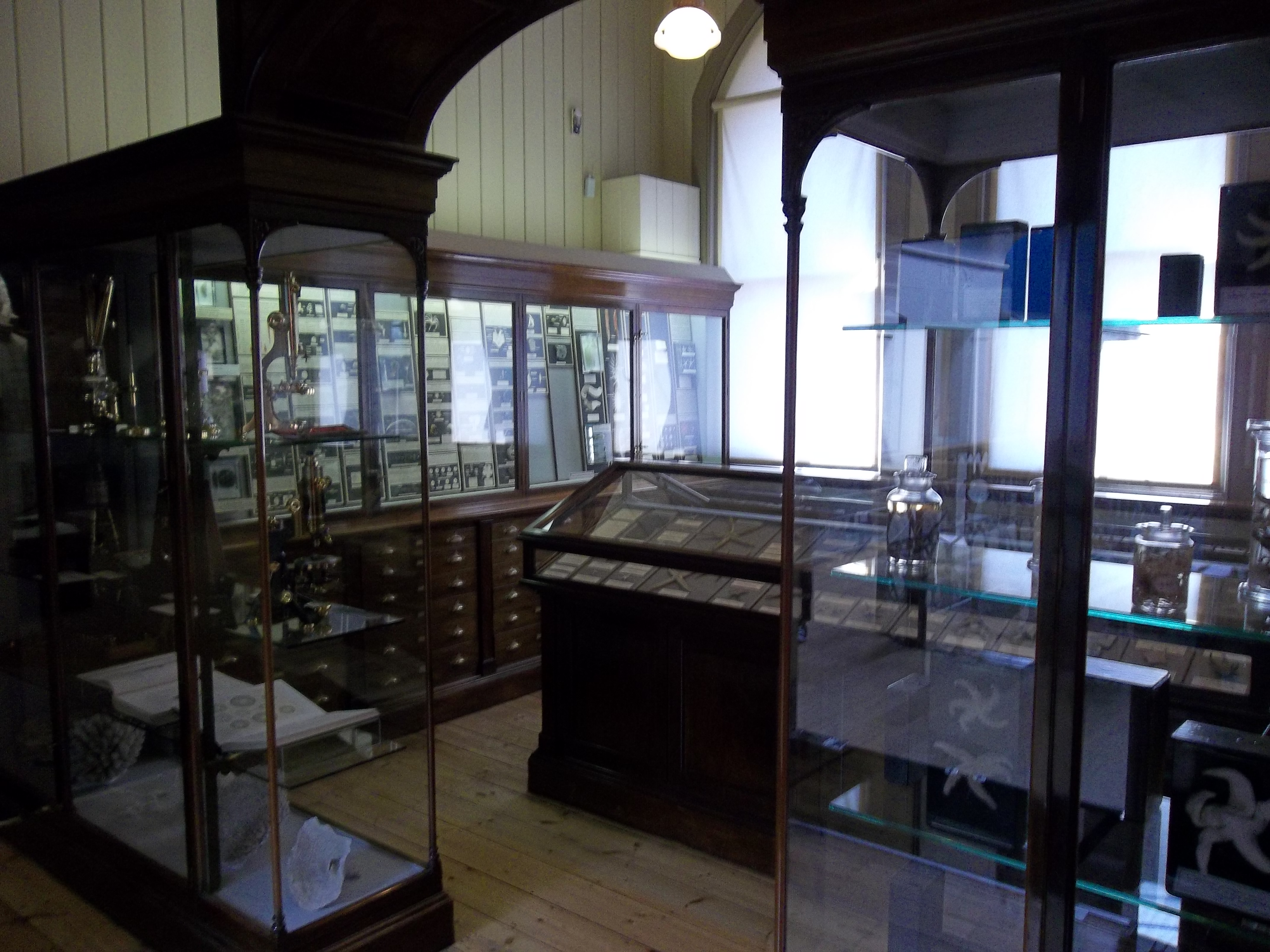
The study of Percy Sladen; his collection of echinoderms is one of the most significant outside any national collection.

The museum's zoology collection includes specimens of invertebrates and mammals from across the world. Percy Sladen's collection of echinoderms is held by the museum and considered the most important of its kind outside of any national collection.

The costume and textiles collection of the museum is considerable; according to the University of Brighton, they "must rank as one of the most important collections outside London". Due to the delicate nature of these materials, the collection is not on permanent display.

RAMM's art collection comprises over 7,000 objects including paintings, drawings, prints and sculpture, representing important British artists and emphasising RAMM's location in the South West. Significant artists represented in the collection include Gainsborough, Reynolds, Pompeo Batoni, Richard Wilson and Joseph Wright of Derby; Walter Sickert, Barbara Hepworth, John Nash, Edward Burra, David Bomberg and Patrick Heron.

The donors who contributed to the collection include Kent Kingdon (an upholsterer and interior designer), Sir Harry Veitch (owner of the horticultural firm Veitch and Sons) and John Lane (founder of the publishing firm The Bodley Head).

== Awards and recognition ==
RAMM was named the United Kingdom's museum of the year by the Art Fund charity in 2012, citing its "ambition and imagination".

Since reopening, RAMM has won over a dozen other awards, including three regional RIBA (Royal Institute of British Architects) awards (2013); the Collections Trust award recognising the curatorial and collections management good practice of RAMM (2013); and the American Event Design Award for Best Museum Environment (2012).

== Funding ==
RAMM is owned and partly funded by Exeter City Council, with additional funding from Arts Council England's National Portfolio Organisation programme of investment in the arts. Significant development funding was received from the Heritage Lottery Fund in 2007–11.

== Select collection examples ==
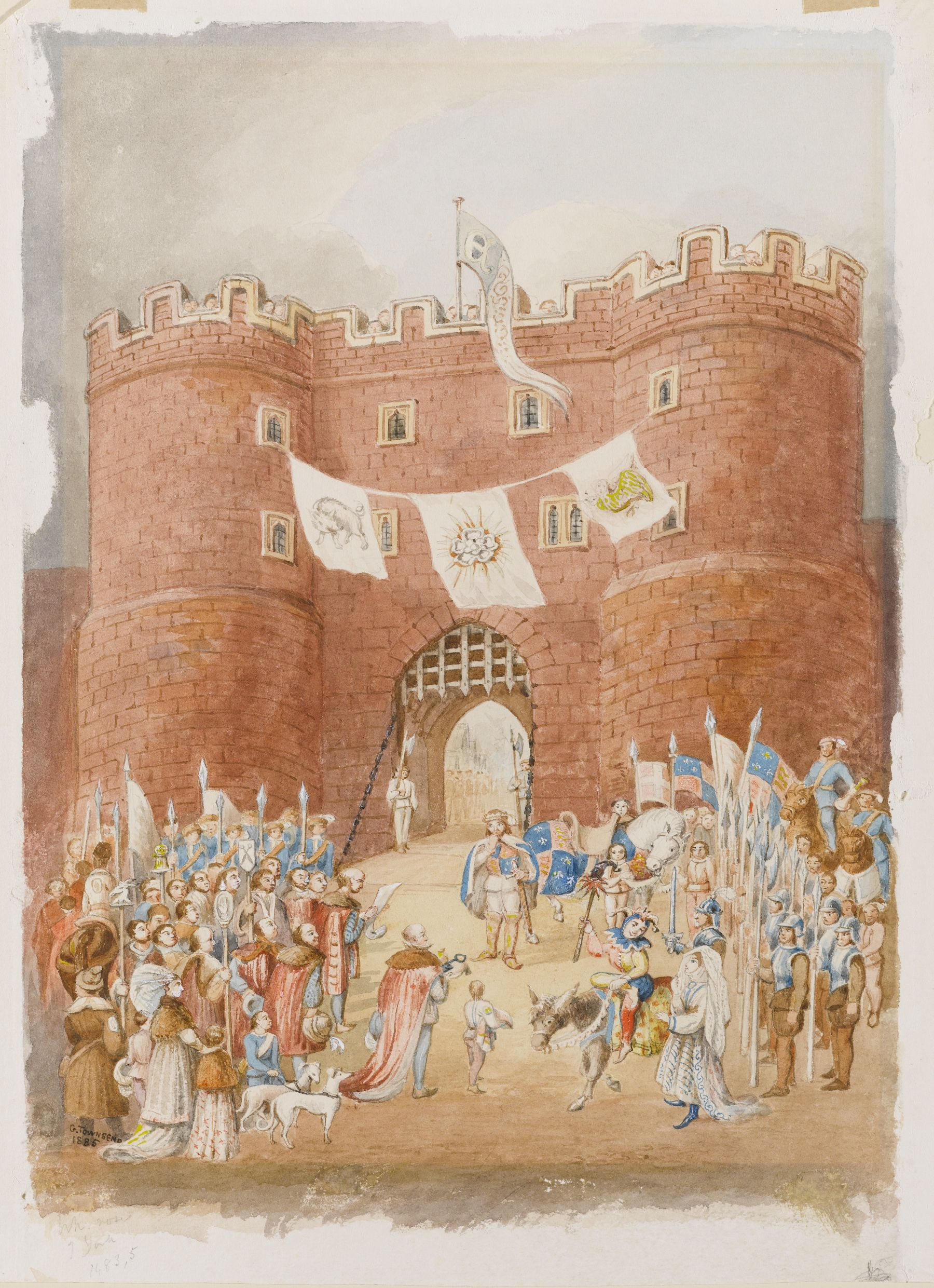
The East Gate, Exeter and the Visit of King Richard III, 1483 by George Townsend

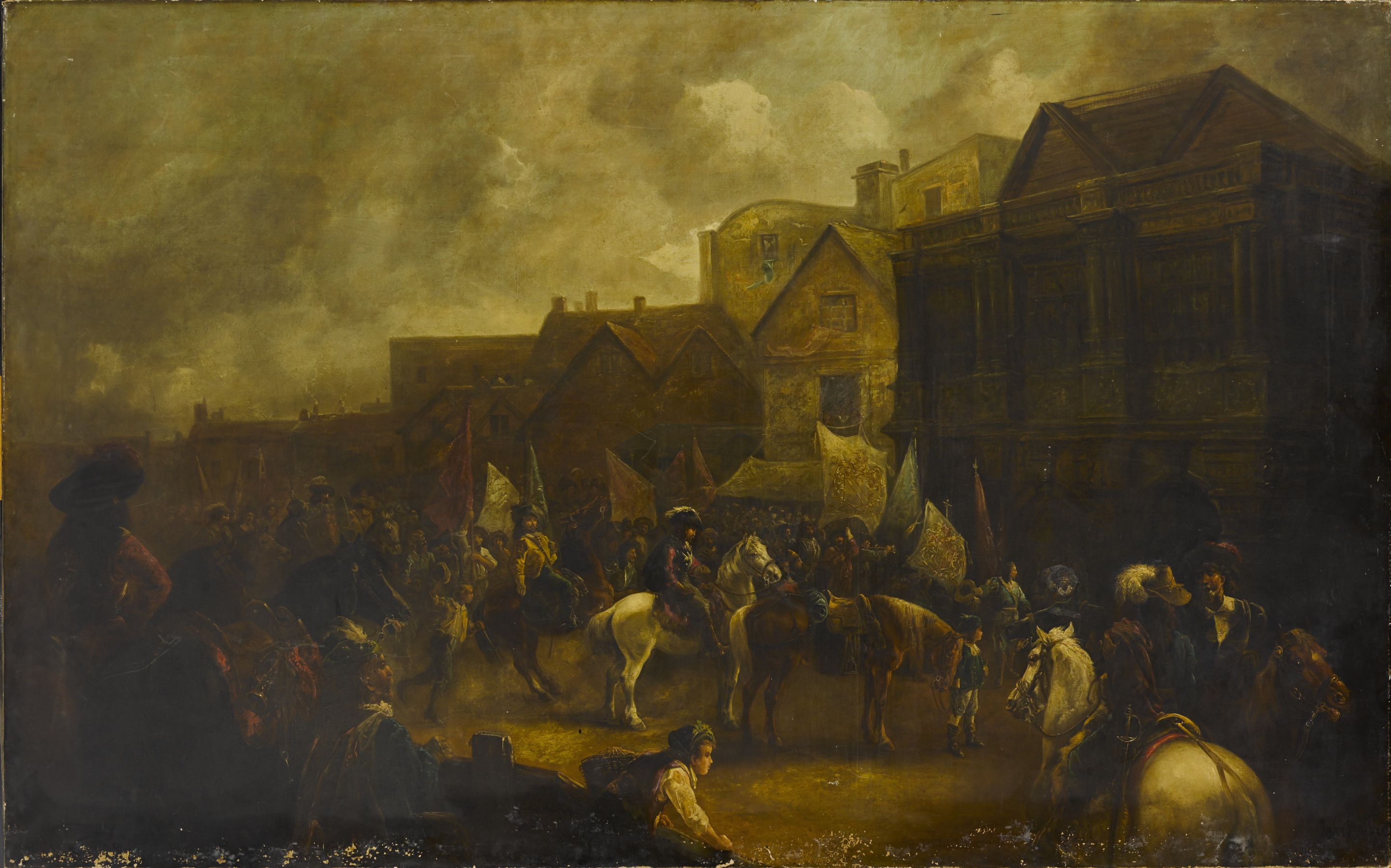
Cavalier Troops Mustering outside the Guildhall, Exeter by John Joseph Baker

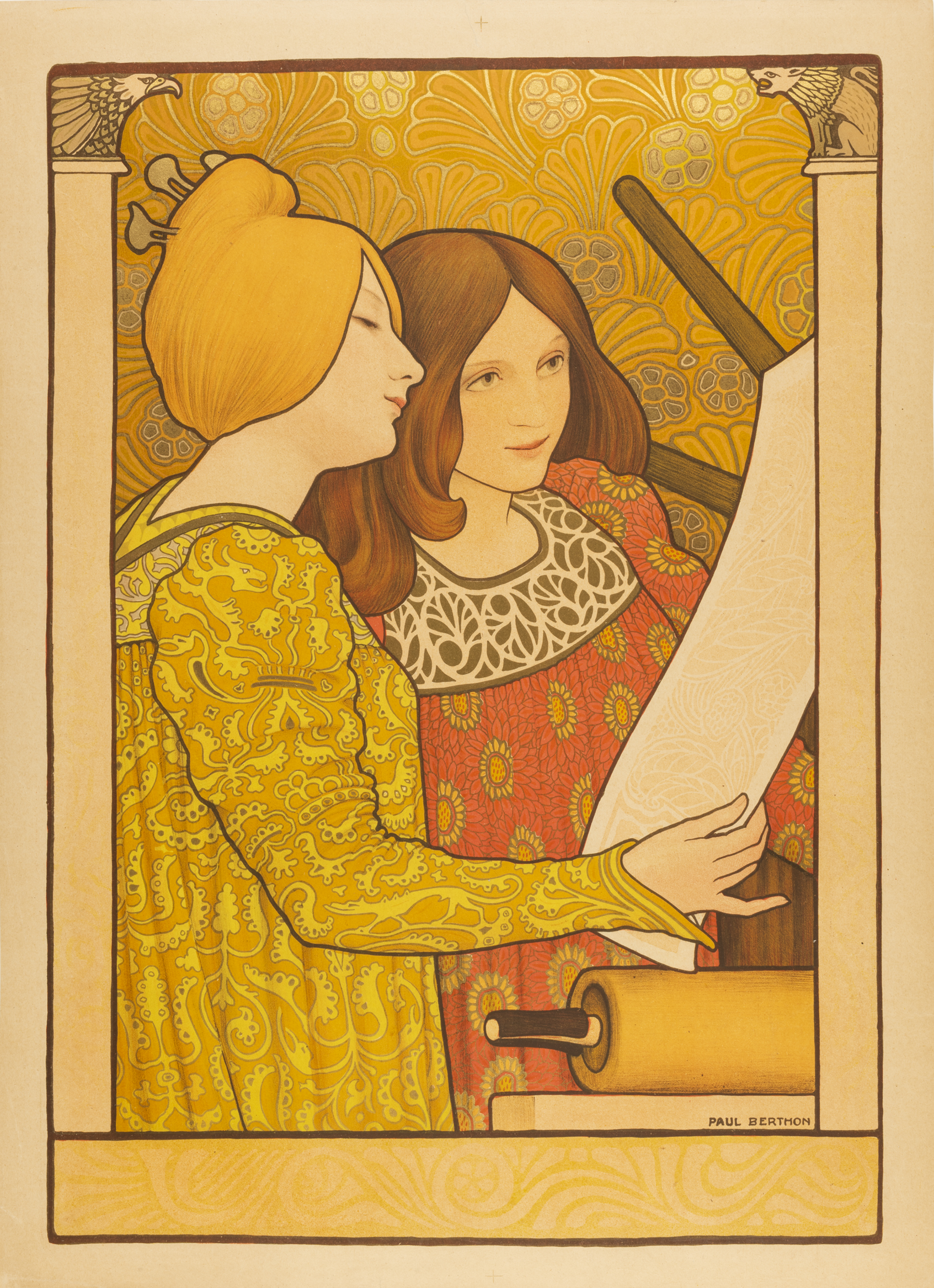
Two girls at the printing press by Paul Berthon

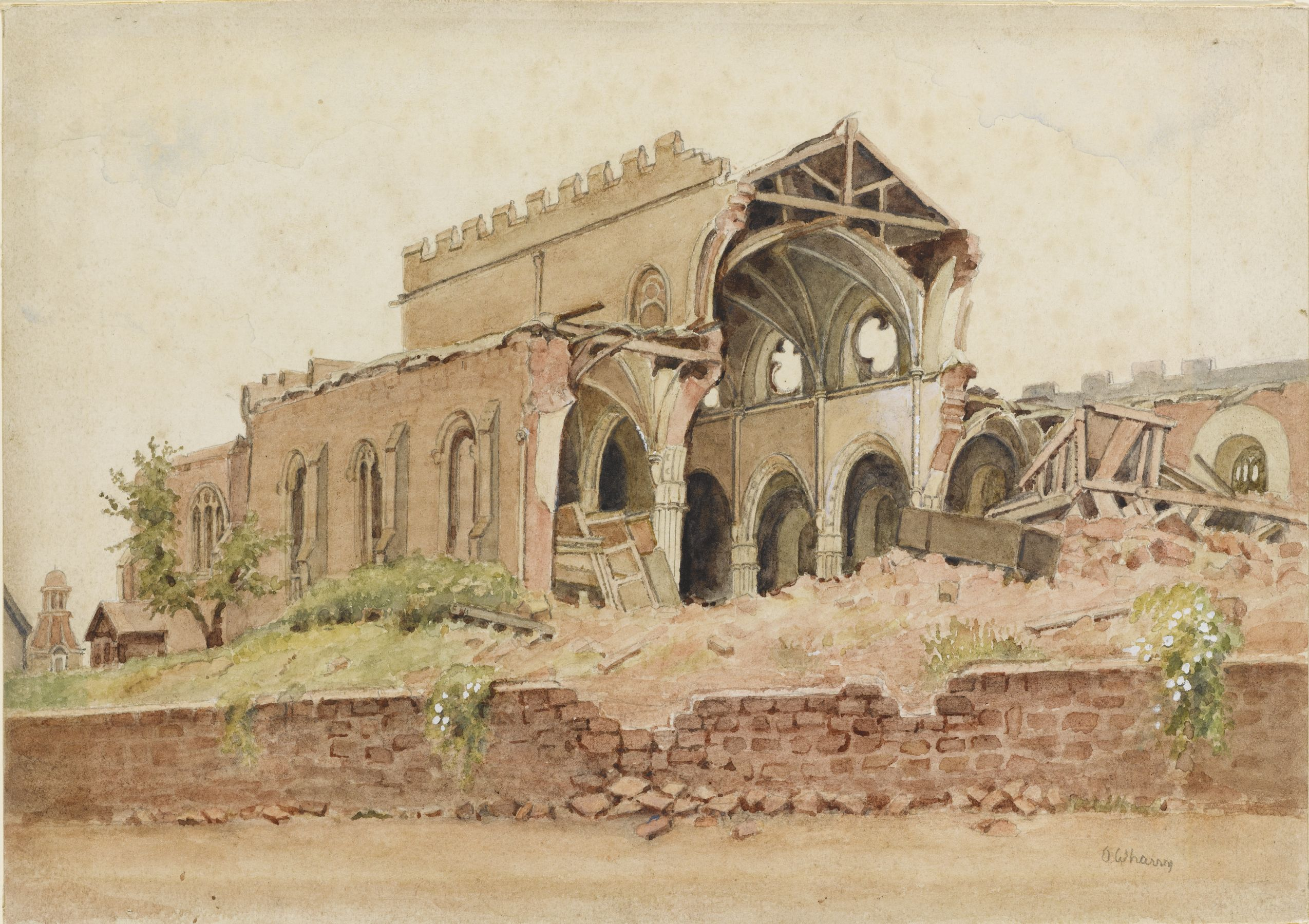
St. Sidwell’s Church, Exeter, after the Blitz by Olive Wharry

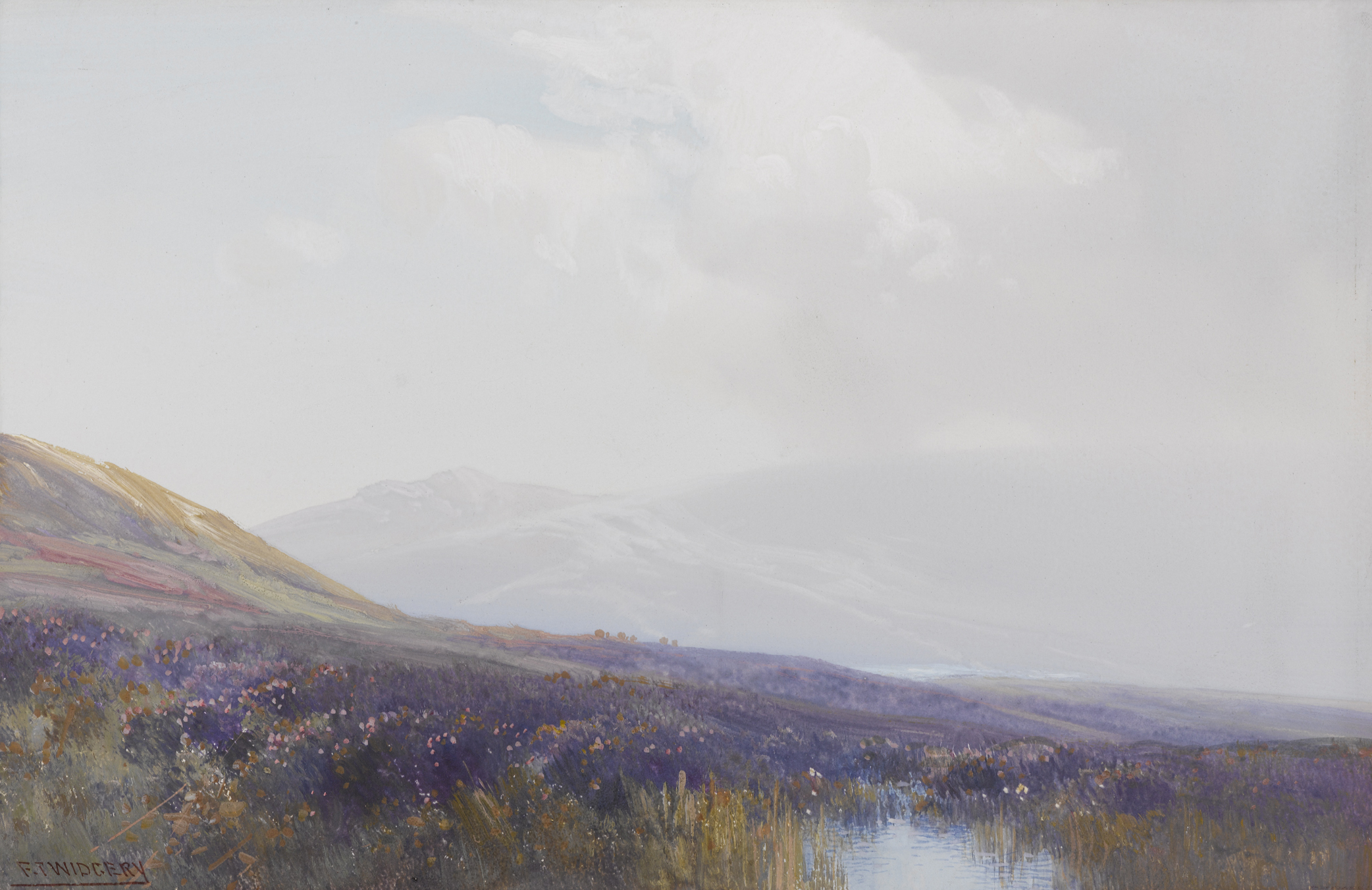
Taw Marsh, Dartmoor by Frederick John Widgery

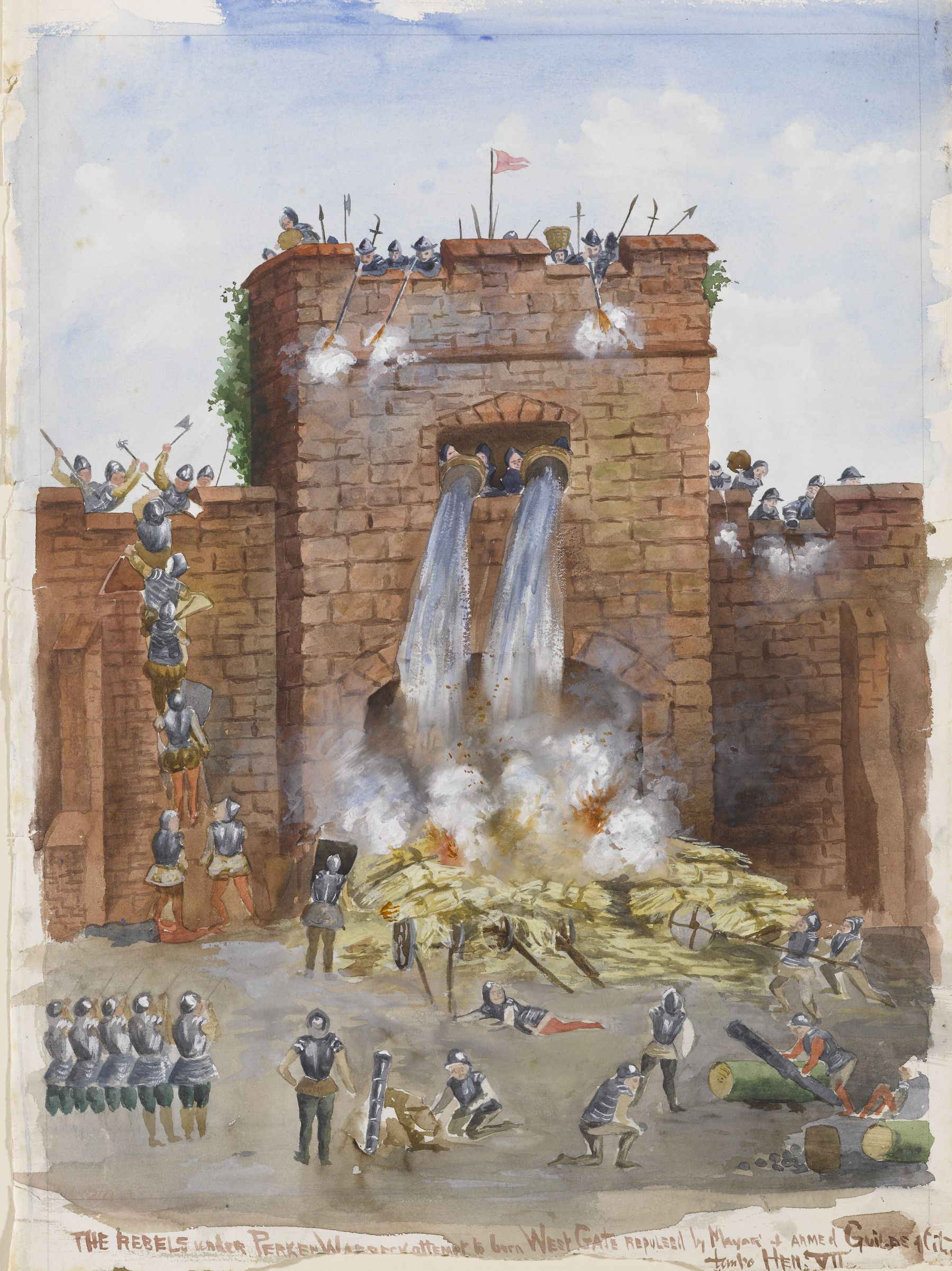
Rebels under Perkin Warbeck attempt to burn the West gate by Mary Drew

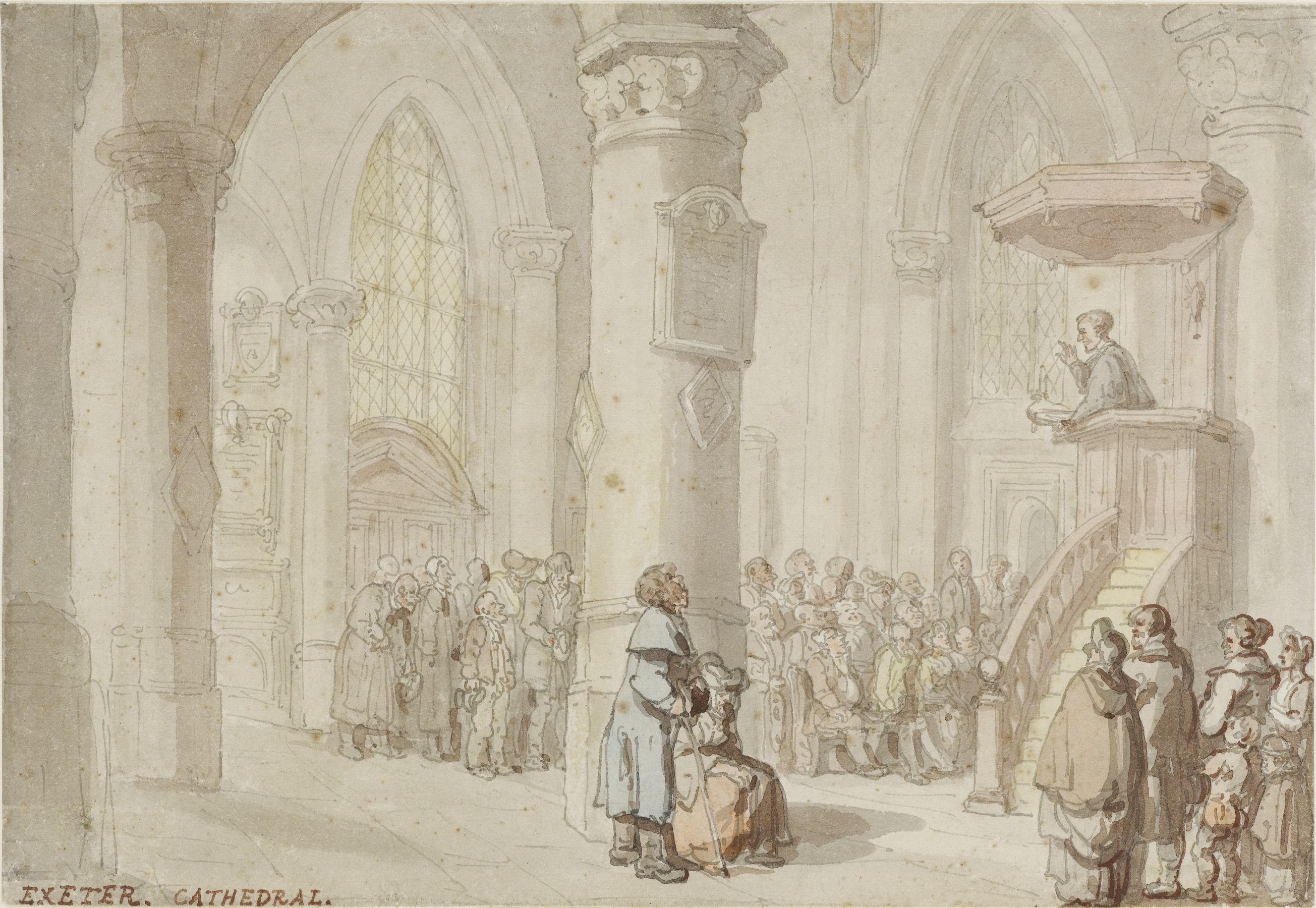
A Sermon in Exeter Cathedral by Thomas Rowlandson

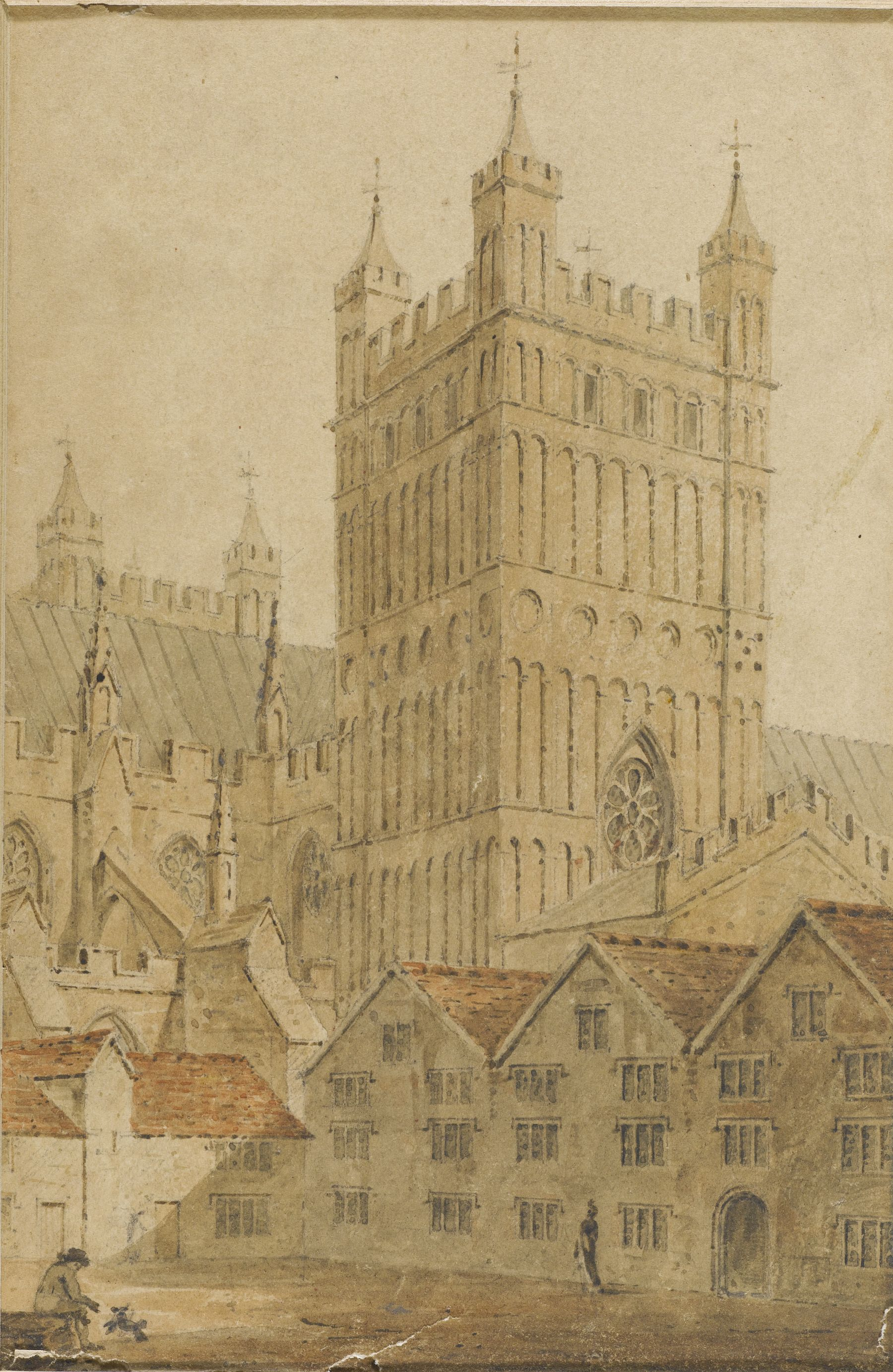
South Tower of Exeter Cathedral by W. Davey.

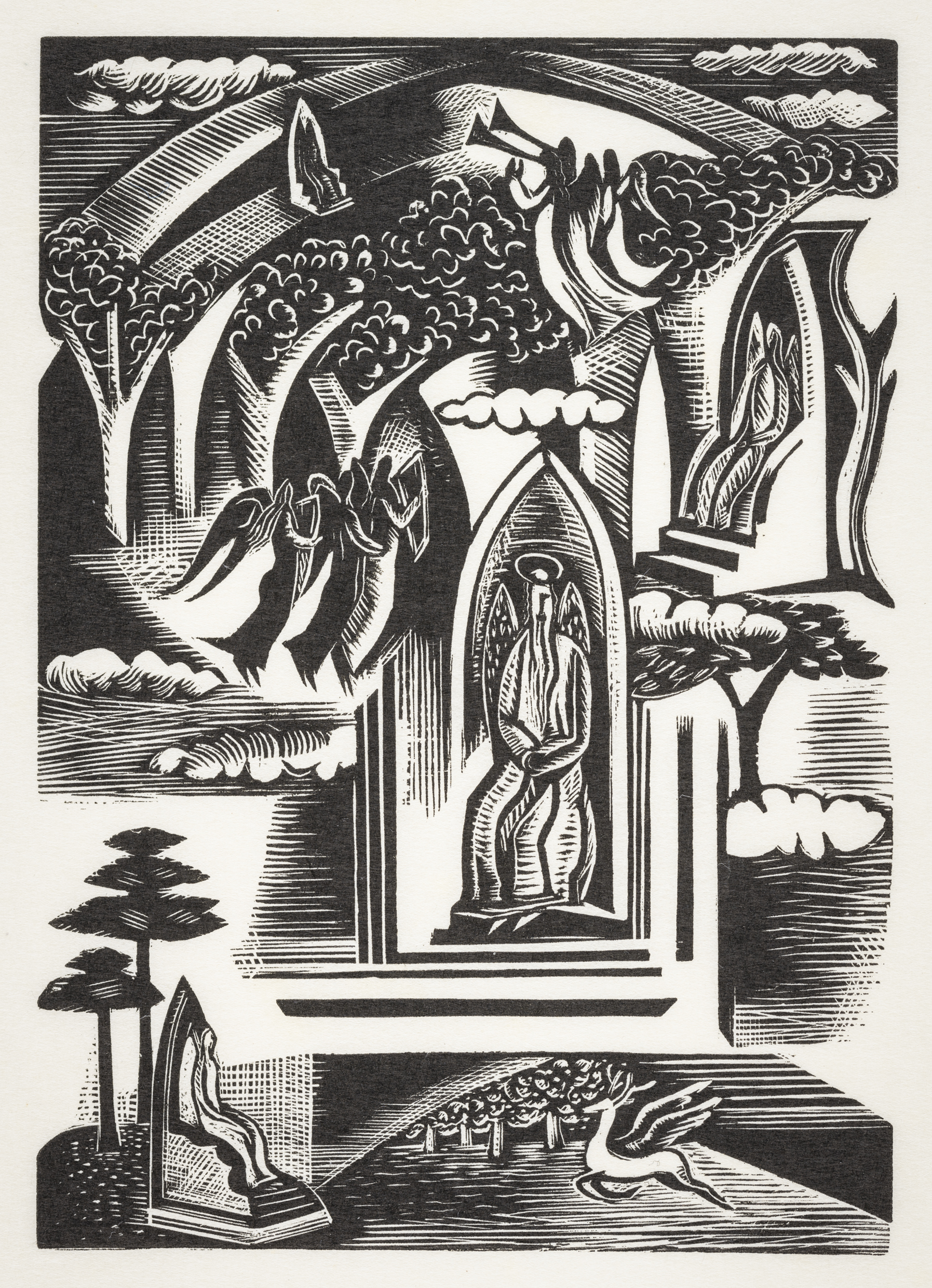
Heaven by Paul Nash.

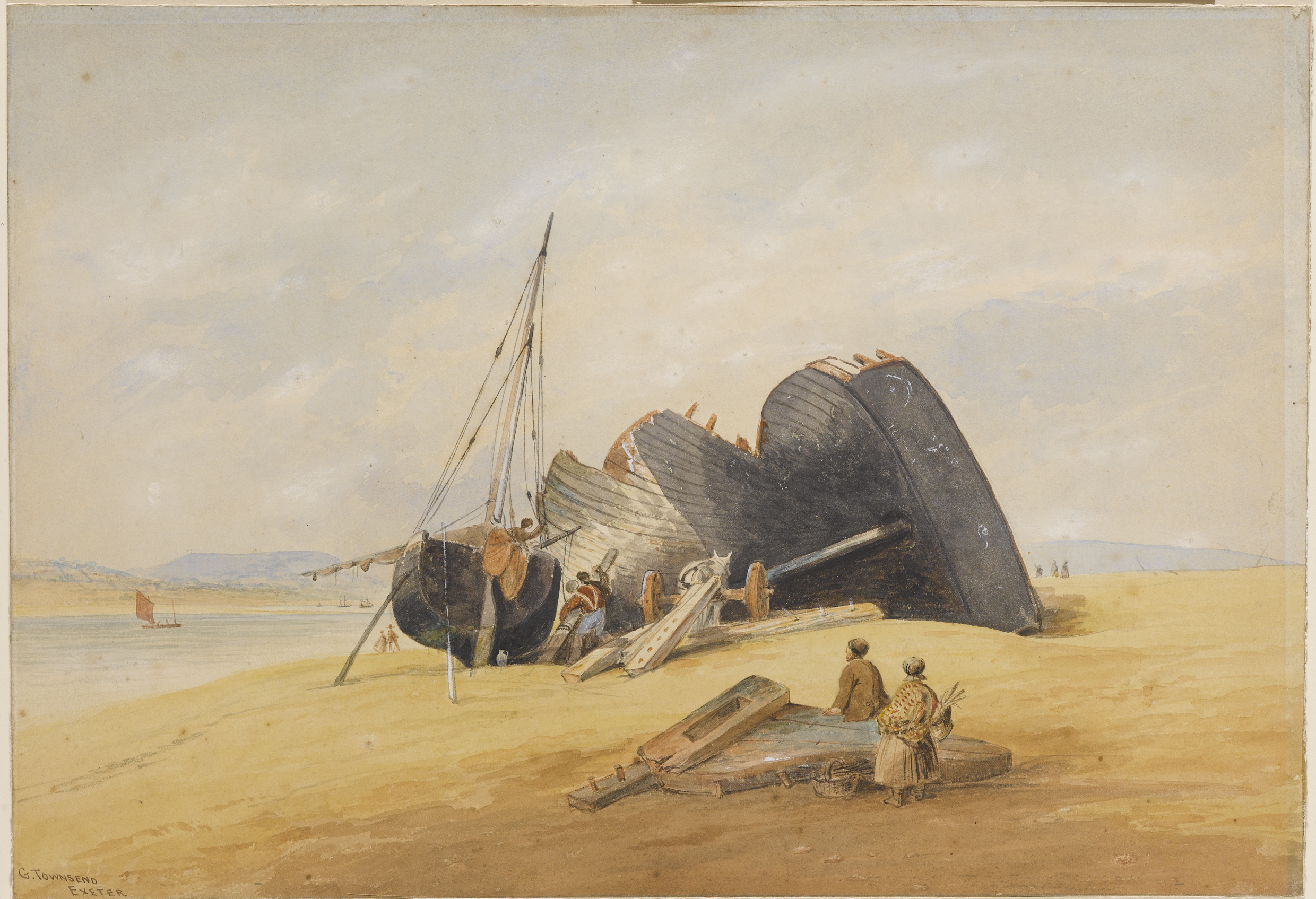
Salvaging a wreck on Exmouth beach by George Townsend

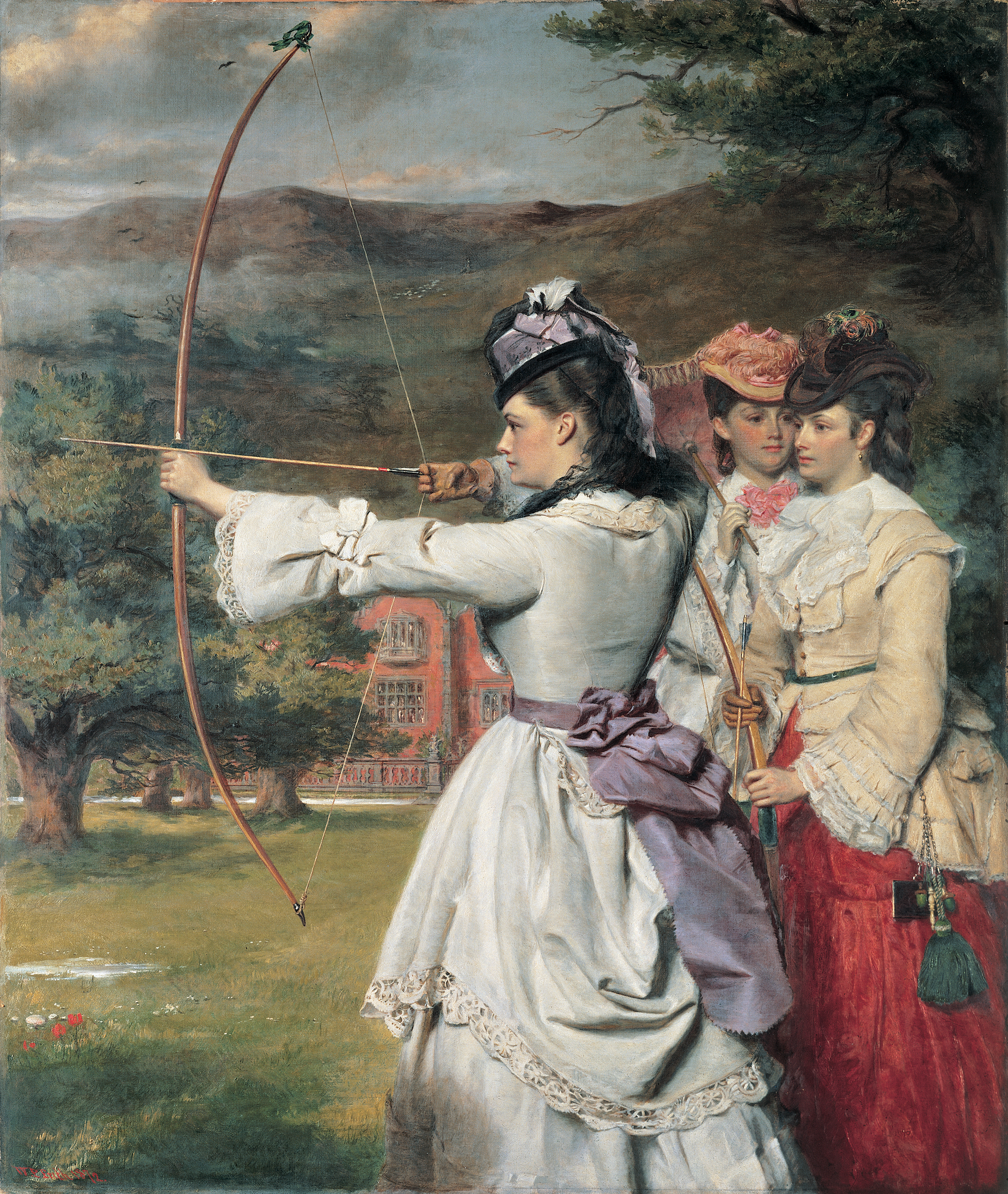
The Fair Toxophilites by William Powell Frith, 1872

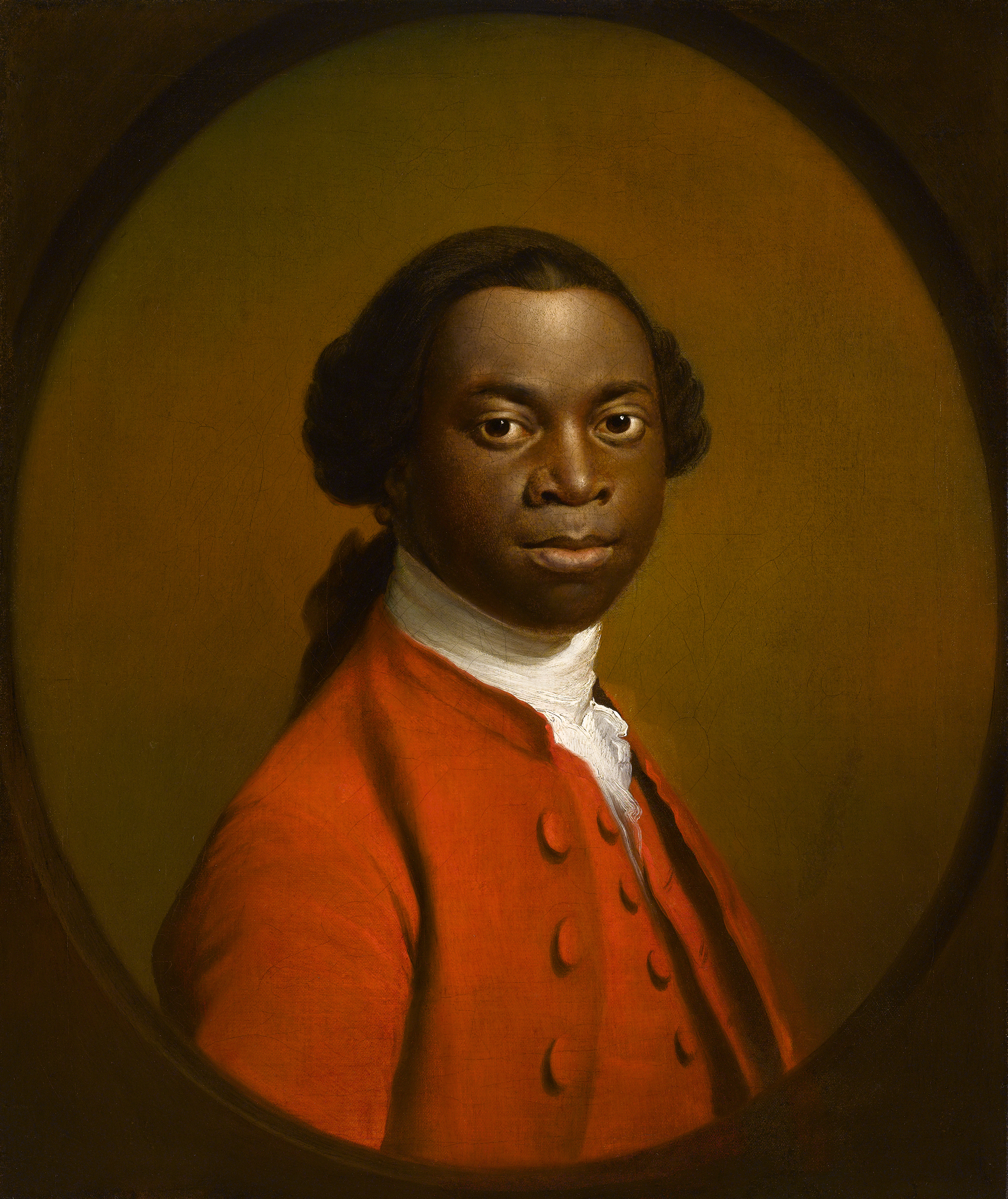
Portrait of a Man in a Red Suit
