= Grade I listed buildings in Exeter =

Exeter shown in Devon

There are over 9,000 Grade I listed buildings in England. This page is a list of these buildings in the district of Exeter in Devon.

== Exeter ==
Name	Location	Type	Completed (Note: The date given is the date used by Historic England as significant for the initial building or that of an important part in the structure's description.)	Date designated	Grid ref. (Note: The grid reference is based on the British national grid reference system, sometimes known as OSGB36, used by the Ordnance Survey.) Geo-coordinates	Entry number (Note: The "List Entry Number" is a unique number assigned to each listed building and scheduled monument by Historic England.)	Image
Bowhill	Exeter	House	c. 1500	29 January 1953	SX9065291592; 50°42′49″N 3°33′01″W	1103985	Bowhill More images
Cathedral Church of St Peter	Exeter	Cathedral	Mid 14th century	29 January 1953	SX9211592550; 50°43′21″N 3°31′47″W	1333352	Cathedral Church of St Peter More images
Church of St David	Exeter	Church	1897–99	29 January 1953	SX9153293103; 50°43′39″N 3°32′17″W	1267226	Church of St David More images
Church of St Mary Steps	Exeter	Church	15th century	29 January 1953	SX9176092267; 50°43′12″N 3°32′05″W	1224263	Church of St Mary Steps More images
Church of St Michael and All Angels	Exeter	Chapel of ease	1865–68	18 June 1974	SX9156892709; 50°43′26″N 3°32′15″W	1170013	Church of St Michael and All Angels More images
Church of St Thomas the Apostle	Exeter	Church	Consecrated 1412	29 January 1953	SX9122291818; 50°42′57″N 3°32′32″W	1169954	Church of St Thomas the Apostle More images
Custom House, Wharfinger's House and Attached Warehouse	Exeter	Custom house	1680–81	29 January 1953	SX9196392147; 50°43′08″N 3°31′54″W	1223038	Custom House, Wharfinger's House and Attached Warehouse More images
Gatehouse to Bishop's Palace	Exeter	Gatehouse	Probably 14th century	29 January 1953	SX9211892429; 50°43′17″N 3°31′47″W	1222909	Gatehouse to Bishop's Palace More images
George's Chapel	Exeter	Unitarian chapel	1760	29 January 1953	SX9210492342; 50°43′14″N 3°31′47″W	1267126	George's Chapel More images
Mol's Coffee House	Exeter	Timber-framed house	1596	29 January 1953	SX9210392649; 50°43′24″N 3°31′48″W	1104060	Mol's Coffee House More images
Former Presentation of St Mary Convent School, Palace Gate	Exeter	Archdeaconry	Mid to late 15th century	18 June 1974	SX9212392374; 50°43′15″N 3°31′46″W	1222911	Former Presentation of St Mary Convent School, Palace Gate More images
Quay House Visitor Centre	Exeter	Warehouse	1679–80	18 June 1974	SX9201992129; 50°43′07″N 3°31′52″W	1223072	Quay House Visitor Centre More images
Rougemont Castle	Exeter	Castle	Norman	29 January 1953	SX9207192937; 50°43′34″N 3°31′50″W	1104054	Rougemont Castle More images
St Martin's Church	Exeter	Church	Late 14th century	29 January 1953	SX9210392655; 50°43′24″N 3°31′48″W	1169625	St Martin's Church More images
St Mary Arches Church	Exeter	Church	12th century	29 January 1953	SX9182892533; 50°43′20″N 3°32′02″W	1239677	St Mary Arches Church More images
St Nicholas Priory	Exeter	Priory	Medieval	29 January 1953	SX9173892485; 50°43′19″N 3°32′06″W	1239752	St Nicholas Priory More images
The Bishop's Palace	Exeter	Bishop's palace	13th century	15 January 1964	SX9214792506; 50°43′20″N 3°31′45″W	1222943	The Bishop's Palace More images
The Guildhall	Exeter	Guildhall	1468–70	29 January 1953	SX9197092651; 50°43′24″N 3°31′55″W	1103905	The Guildhall More images
Former Law Library, rear of 9 Cathedral Close	Exeter	Hall	Probably 15th century	29 January 1953	SX9216692608; 50°43′23″N 3°31′45″W	1104063	Upload Photo
5 Cathedral Close	Exeter	House	Late 17th century	29 January 1953	SX9212692634; 50°43′24″N 3°31′47″W	1169638	5 Cathedral Close More images
8, 9 and 9a Cathedral Close	Exeter	Jettied house	Probably c. 1450	29 January 1953	SX9216092602; 50°43′23″N 3°31′45″W	1306441	8, 9 and 9a Cathedral Close More images
10 Cathedral Close	Exeter	Archdeaconry	Medieval	29 January 1953	SX9218392583; 50°43′22″N 3°31′44″W	1333331	10 Cathedral Close More images

== See also ==
- Grade II* listed buildings in Exeter
