= Exeter =

City in Devon, England

- City and non-metropolitan district
- City of Exeter
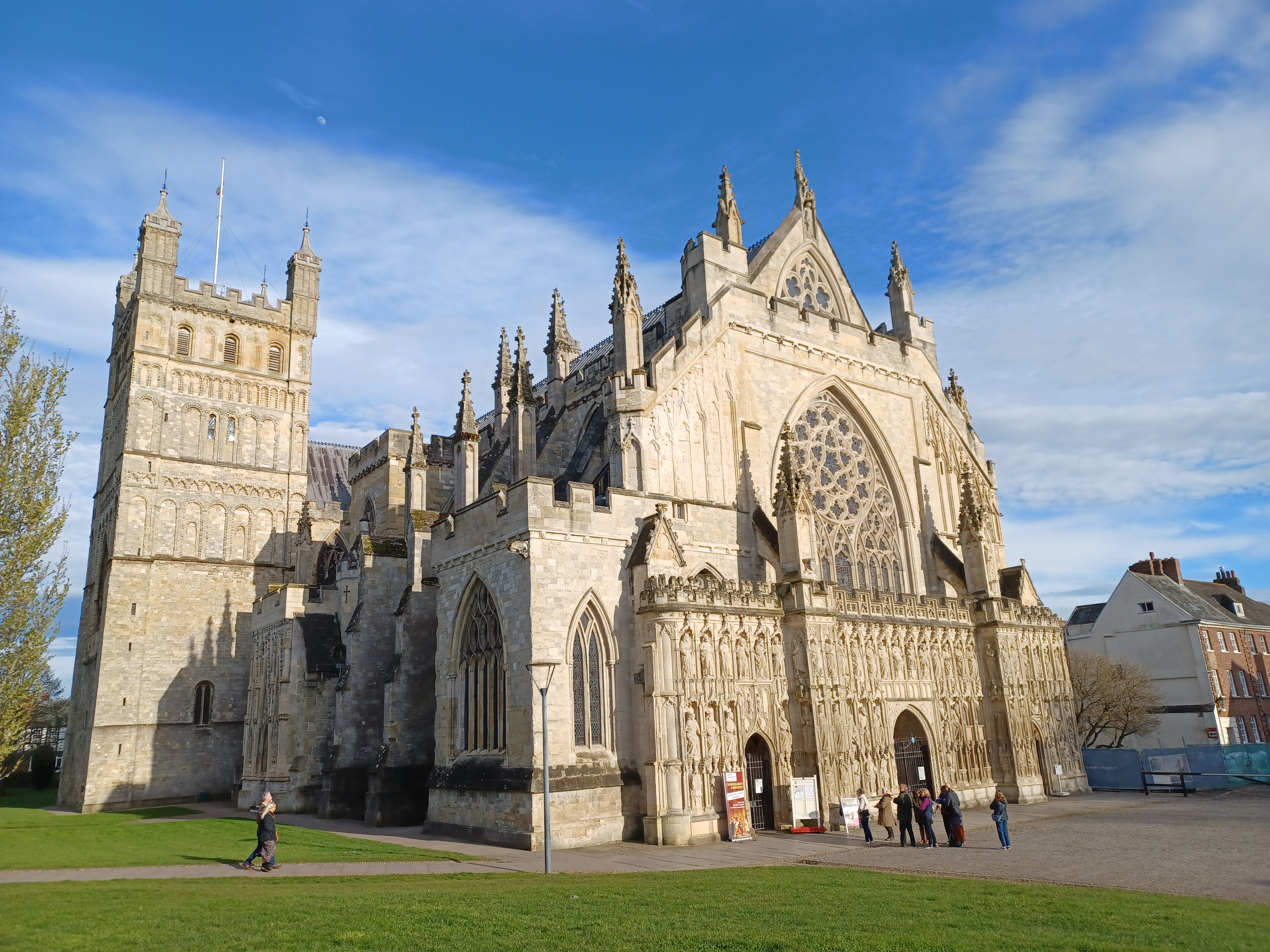
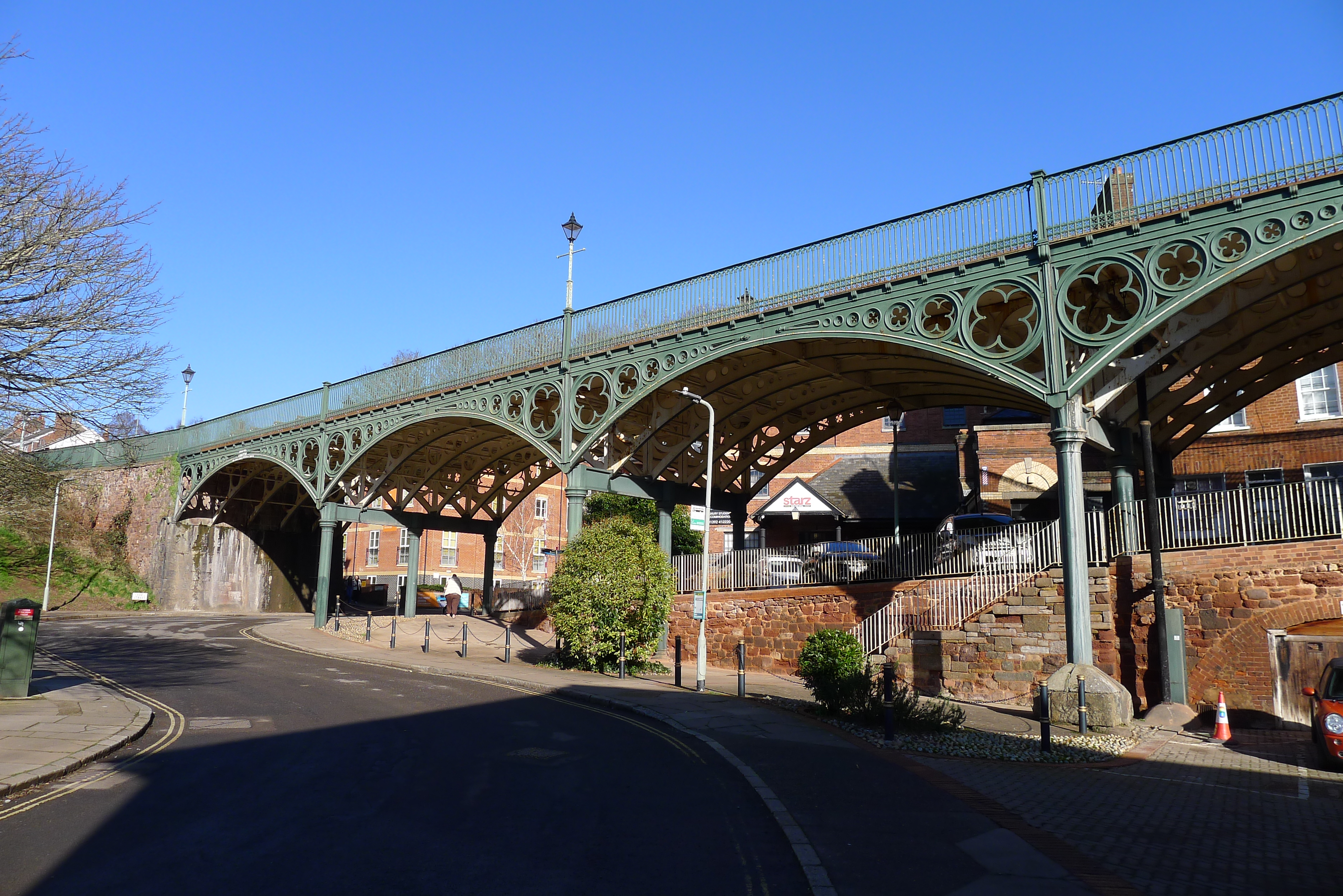
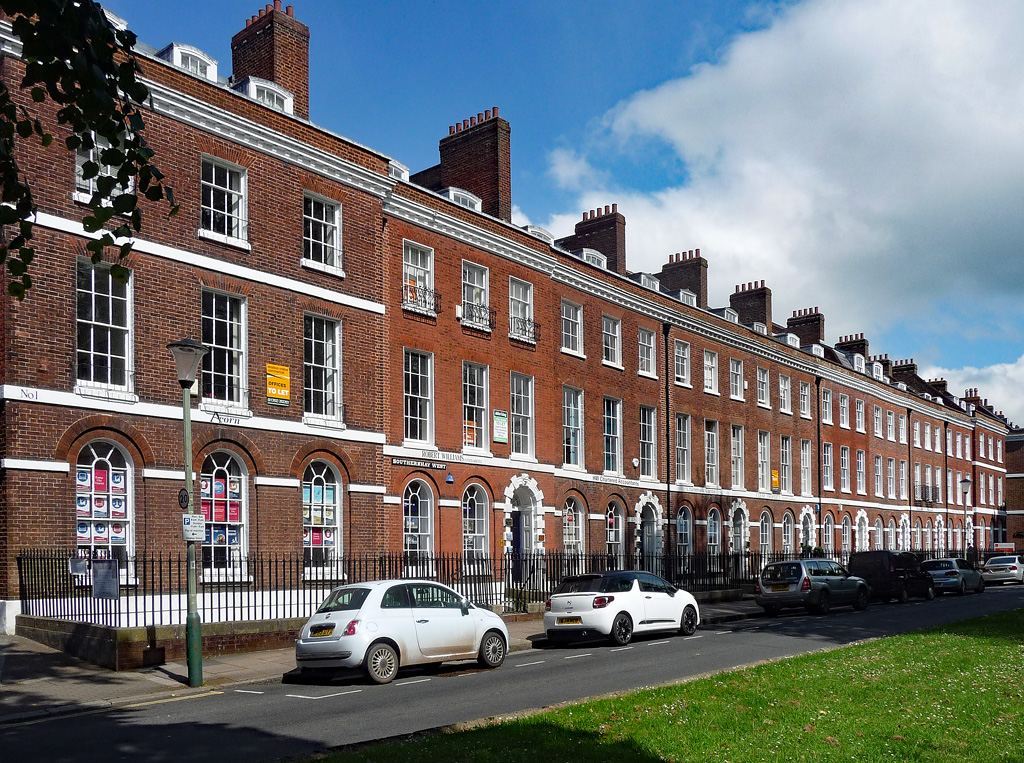
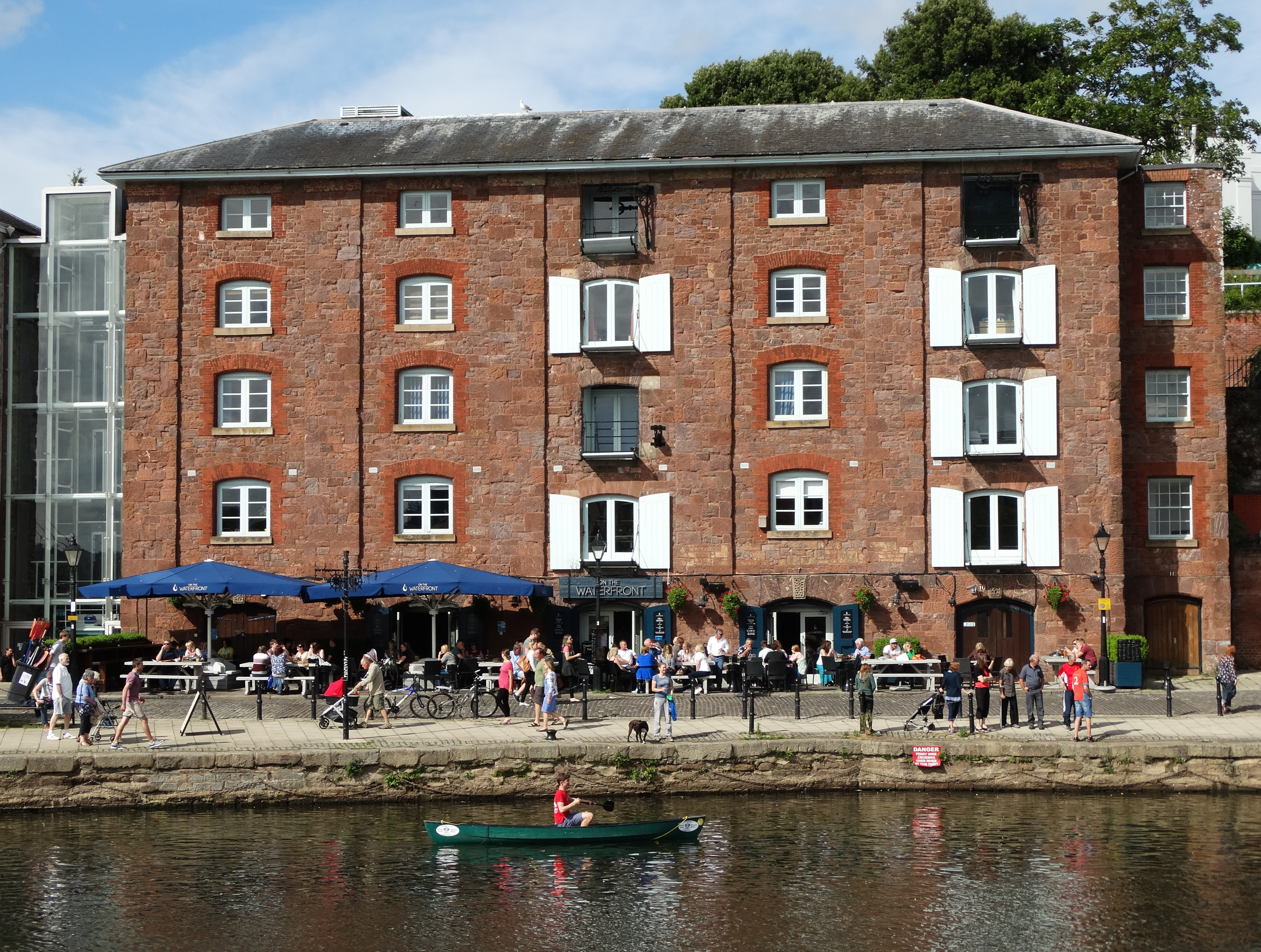
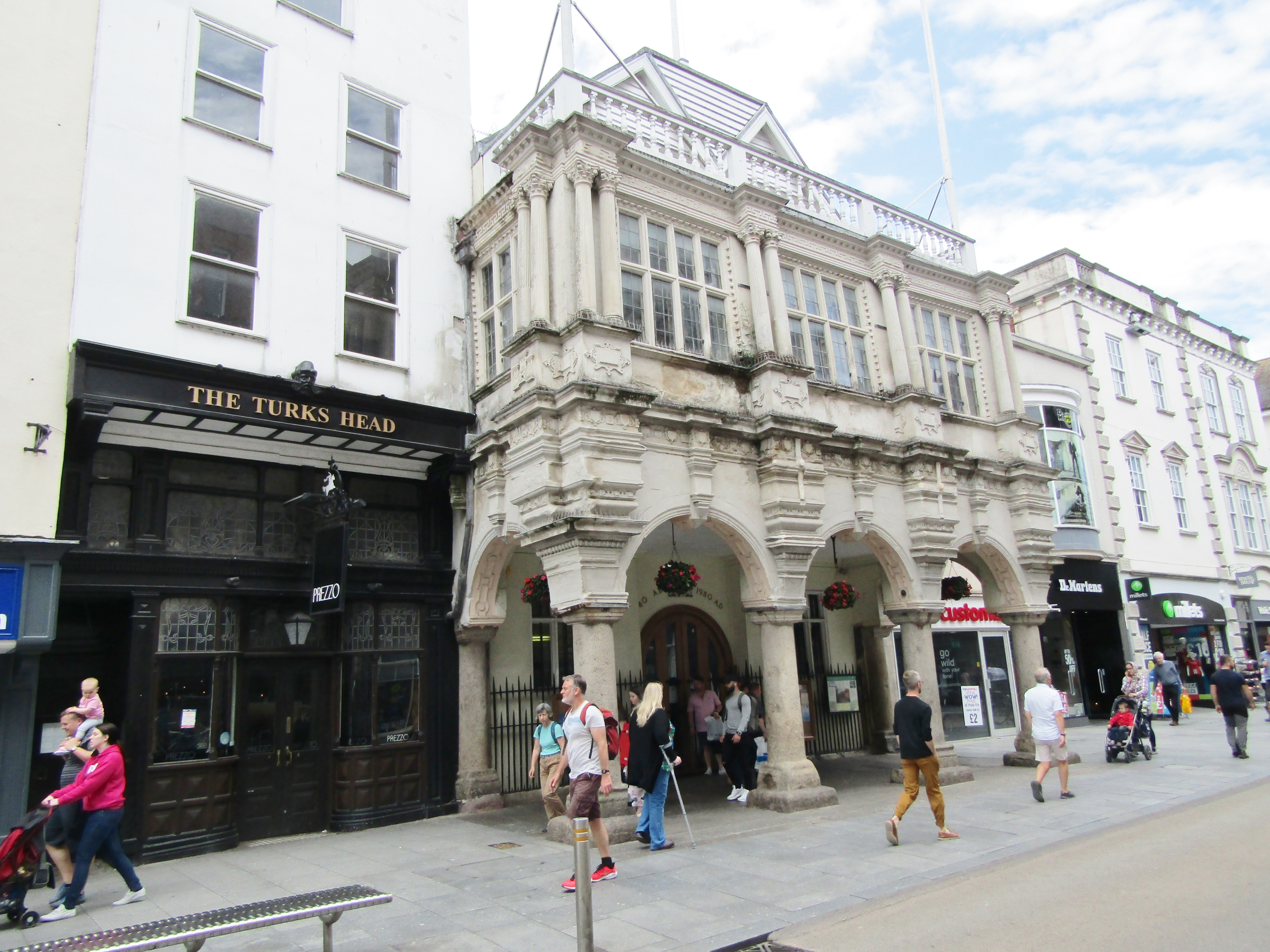
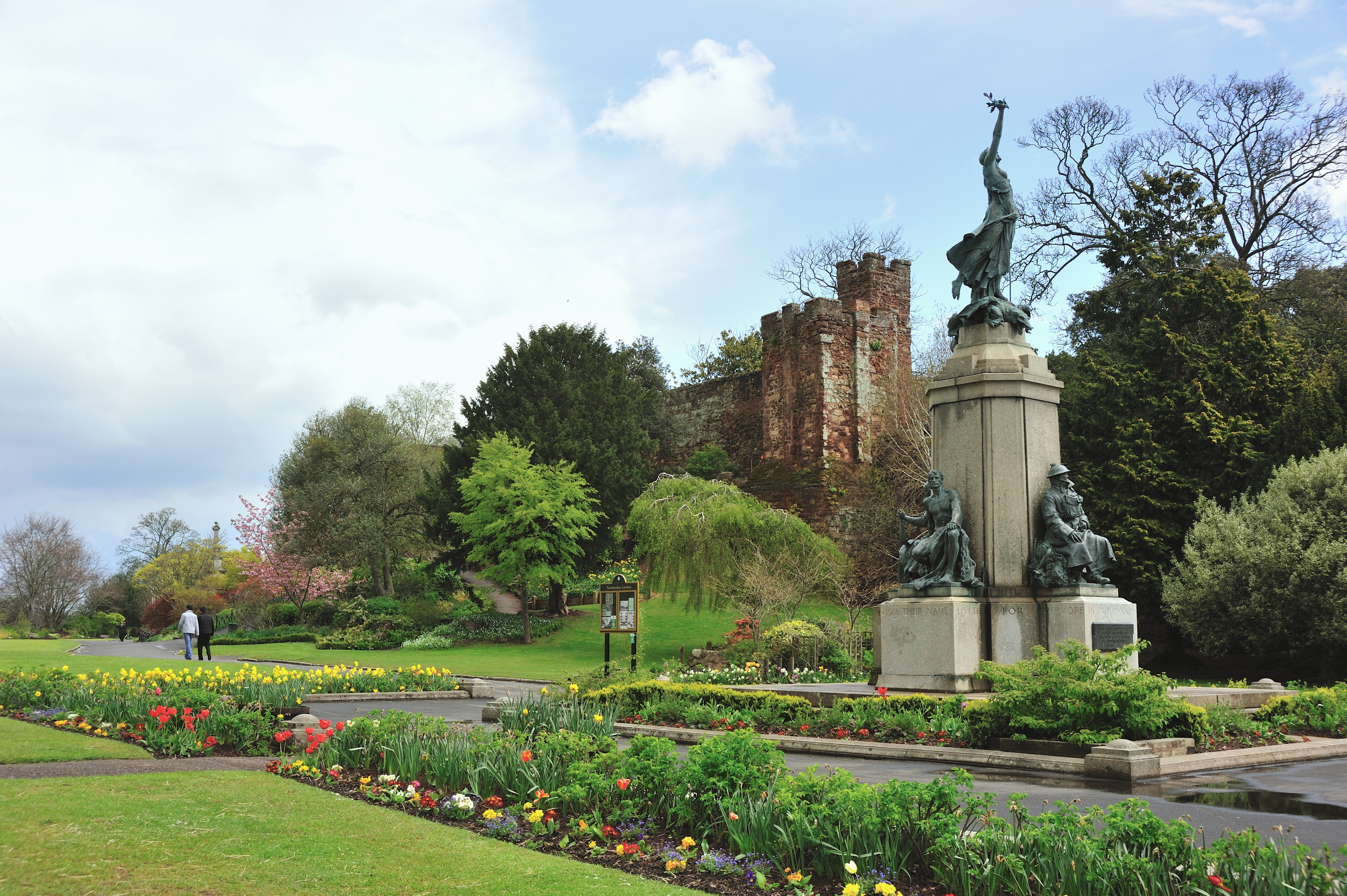
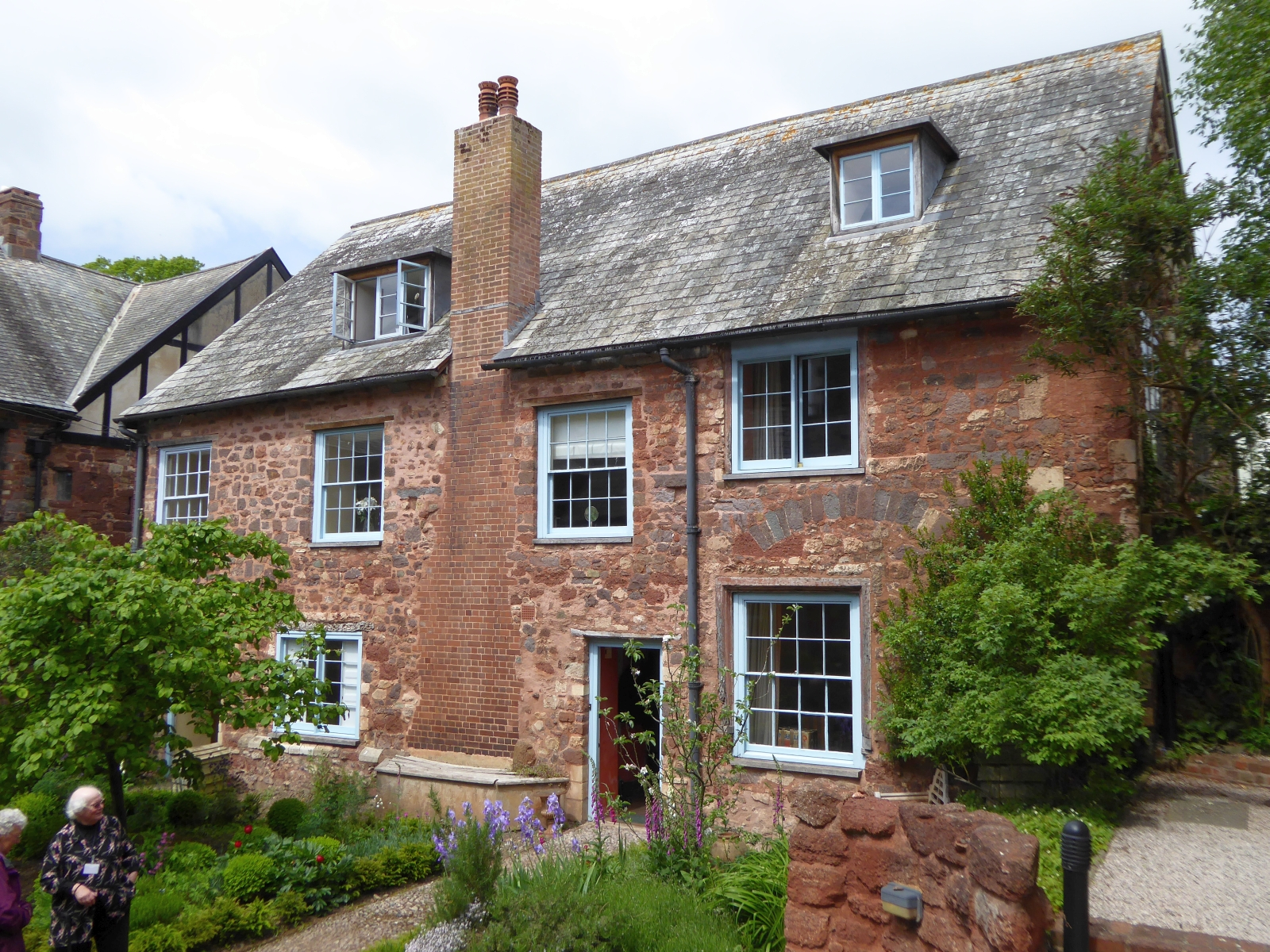
- Exeter Cathedral Iron Bridge Southernhay West The Quay Guildhall Northernhay Gardens St Nicholas Priory

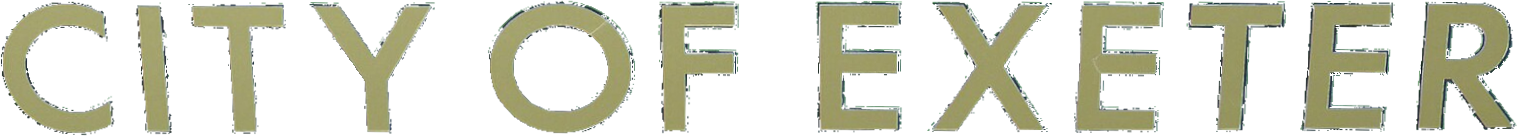
- Coat of arms Wordmark
- Motto: Semper fidelis (Always faithful)
- The District of Exeter including Topsham shown within Devon

- Location within the United Kingdom Location within England Location in Devon Location within Europe
- Coordinates: 50°43′32″N 03°31′37″W
- Sovereign state: United Kingdom
- Country: England
- Region: South West England
- Ceremonial and shire county: Devon
- City status: Time immemorial
- Non-metropolitan district: 1974

Government
  - Type: Non-metropolitan district
  - Body: Exeter City Council
  - Leader of the Council: Councillor Philip Bialyk
  - Council control: Labour
  - Members of Parliament: Stephen Race (L); David Reed (C)

Area
  - Total: 18 sq mi (47 km^{2})
  - Rank: 246th (of 296)
- Highest elevation: 715 ft (218 m)
- Lowest elevation: −9.8 ft (−3 m)

Population (2025)
  - Total: 137,894
  - Rank: 179th (of 296)
  - Density: 7,600/sq mi (2,900/km^{2})
  - Demonyms: Exonian
  - Ethnicity (2011): 93.05% White: 88.32% White British; 0.53% White Irish; 0.08% Romani people or Irish Traveller; 4.12% Other White; 1.65% Mixed; 0.34% White and Black Caribbean; 0.24% White and Black African; 0.66% White and Asian; 0.41% Other mixed; 3.90% Asian; 0.80% Indian; 0.14% Pakistani; 0.19% Bangladeshi; 1.70% Chinese; 1.07% Other Asian; 0.57% Black; 0.42% Black African; 0.11% Black Caribbean; 0.04% Other Black; 0.83% Other; 0.56% Arab; 0.28% Other
- Time zone: UTC0 (GMT)
  - Summer (DST): UTC+1 (BST)
- Postcode district: EX1-6
- Area code: 01392
- Police: Devon and Cornwall
- Ambulance: South Western
- Fire: Devon and Somerset
- Website: Exeter City Council

Exeter (/ˈɛksɪtər/ EK-sit-ər) is a cathedral city and the county town of Devon in South West England. It is situated on the River Exe, approximately 36 mi (58 km) northeast of Plymouth and 65 mi (105 km) southwest of Bristol. In 2024, Exeter had a population of 137,894, making it the second largest settlement in Devon after Plymouth. Under local government restructuring plans Exeter will, with the addition of parishes from East Devon, Teignbridge and Mid Devon, become the Exeter unitary authority from 2028.

The history of Exeter began with the civilian settlement associated with the Roman fort of Isca Dumnoniorum c. AD 55. The city was held by Saxons against Viking attacks and then conquered by the Normans. Exeter Cathedral was founded in the mid 11th century and the city became a religious centre during the Middle Ages. In the early modern period, Exeter became an affluent centre for the trade in wool. Experiencing only limited industrialisation, by the First World War the city was in relative economic decline. After the Second World War, much of the city centre was rebuilt.

Exeter is one of the largest and fastest growing cities in South West England, and a centre for education, business, and domestic tourism. It is home to two of the constituent campuses of the University of Exeter: Streatham and St Luke's. The city is connected internationally by Exeter Airport; to the rest of the United Kingdom by Exeter St David's railway station; and by road by the M5 motorway, whose south-west exit is just south of the city. The city retains significant examples of medieval, Tudor, and Georgian architecture.

== Toponymy ==
The name of Exeter derives from the Old English Escanceaster, from the anglicised form of the river now known as the Exe and the Old English suffix -ceaster (as in Dorchester and Gloucester), used to mark important fortresses or fortified towns (from Latin castrum, meaning fortress, or castra, military camp). The name "Exe" is a separate development of the Brittonic name—meaning "water" or, more exactly, "full of fish" (cf. Welsh pysg, pl. "fish")—that also appears in the English Axe and Esk and the Welsh Usk (Wysg).

== History ==
=== Stone, Bronze, and Iron Ages ===
Exeter began as settlements on a dry ridge ending in a spur overlooking a navigable river teeming with fish, with fertile land nearby. Although there have been no major prehistoric finds, these advantages suggest the site was occupied early. Coins from the Hellenistic kingdoms suggest the existence of a settlement trading with the Mediterranean as early as 250 BC.

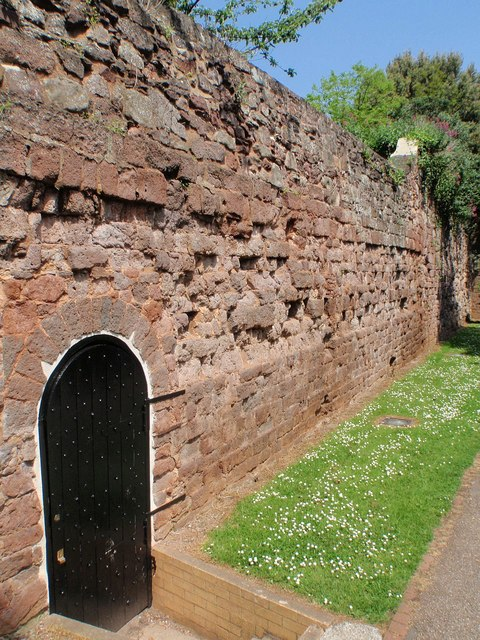
A portion of Exeter's city wall, formed of both Roman and medieval stones

=== Roman ===
In c. AD 55, the Romans established a 42-acre (17 ha) fort (Castrum) named Isca at this site. The fort served as the southwest terminus of the Fosse Way (part of the Antonine Itinerary) and base for the 5,000-man Second Augustan Legion. An unplanned community (vicus) of natives and the soldiers' families grew up around it, which served as the tribal capital of the Dumnonii. When the fortress was abandoned c. AD 75, its grounds were converted to civilian use: its very large bathhouse was replaced by a forum and a basilica, and a smaller-scale bath was erected to the southeast.

In the late 2nd century, the ditch and rampart defences around the old fortress were replaced by a bank and wall enclosing a much larger area, some 92 acres (37 hectares). The settlement seems to have been most prosperous in the first half of the 4th century: more than a thousand Roman coins have been found around the city and there is evidence for copper and bronze working, a stock-yard, and markets for the livestock, crops, and pottery produced in the surrounding countryside. The absence of coins dated after 380 suggests a rapid decline by this point.

=== Middle Ages ===
Nothing is certainly known of Exeter from the time of the Roman withdrawal from Britain around 410 until the seventh century, when it was held by the Saxons (to whom it was known as Escanceaster) who had arrived after defeating the British Dumnonians at Peonnum in Somerset in 658. In 876, the city was attacked and briefly captured by Danish Vikings before Alfred the Great drove them out the next summer. Over the next few years, he elevated Exeter to one of the four burhs in Devon, rebuilding its walls on the Roman lines. These permitted the city to repel another attack and siege by the Danes in 893. Æthelstan again strengthened the walls around 928, and at the same time drove out the remaining Britons from the city. After failing again in 1001, the Danes were finally able to plunder it in 1003 when they were let in, for unknown reasons, by the French reeve of Emma of Normandy, who had been given the city as part of her dowry on her marriage to Æthelred the Unready the previous year.

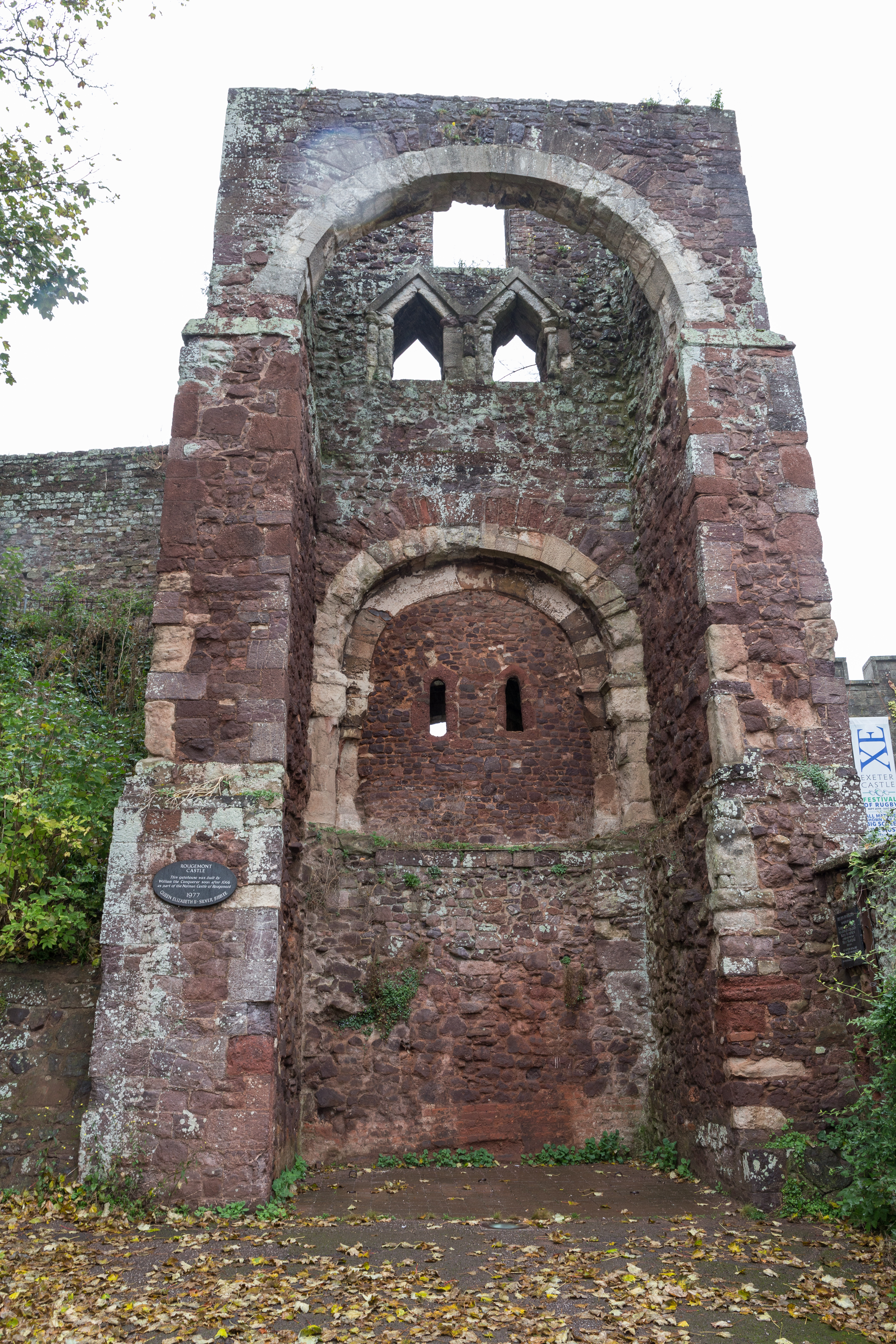
The early Norman gatehouse of Rougemont Castle

In 1068, Exeter was a stronghold of Anglo-Saxon resistance to the Norman Conquest as the residence of Gytha Thorkelsdóttir, the mother of the late Harold Godwinson. William the Conqueror's siege of the city ended in negotiation and generous terms for the defenders, although William had Rougemont Castle built to strengthen Norman control over the area. Saxon properties were transferred into Norman hands and, on the death of Bishop Leofric in 1072, the Norman Osbern FitzOsbern was appointed his successor. In 1136, early in the Anarchy, Rougemont Castle was held by Baldwin de Redvers for three months against Stephen of Blois, submitting only when supplies had been exhausted. During the siege, Stephen built an earthen fortification at the site now known (erroneously) as Danes Castle.

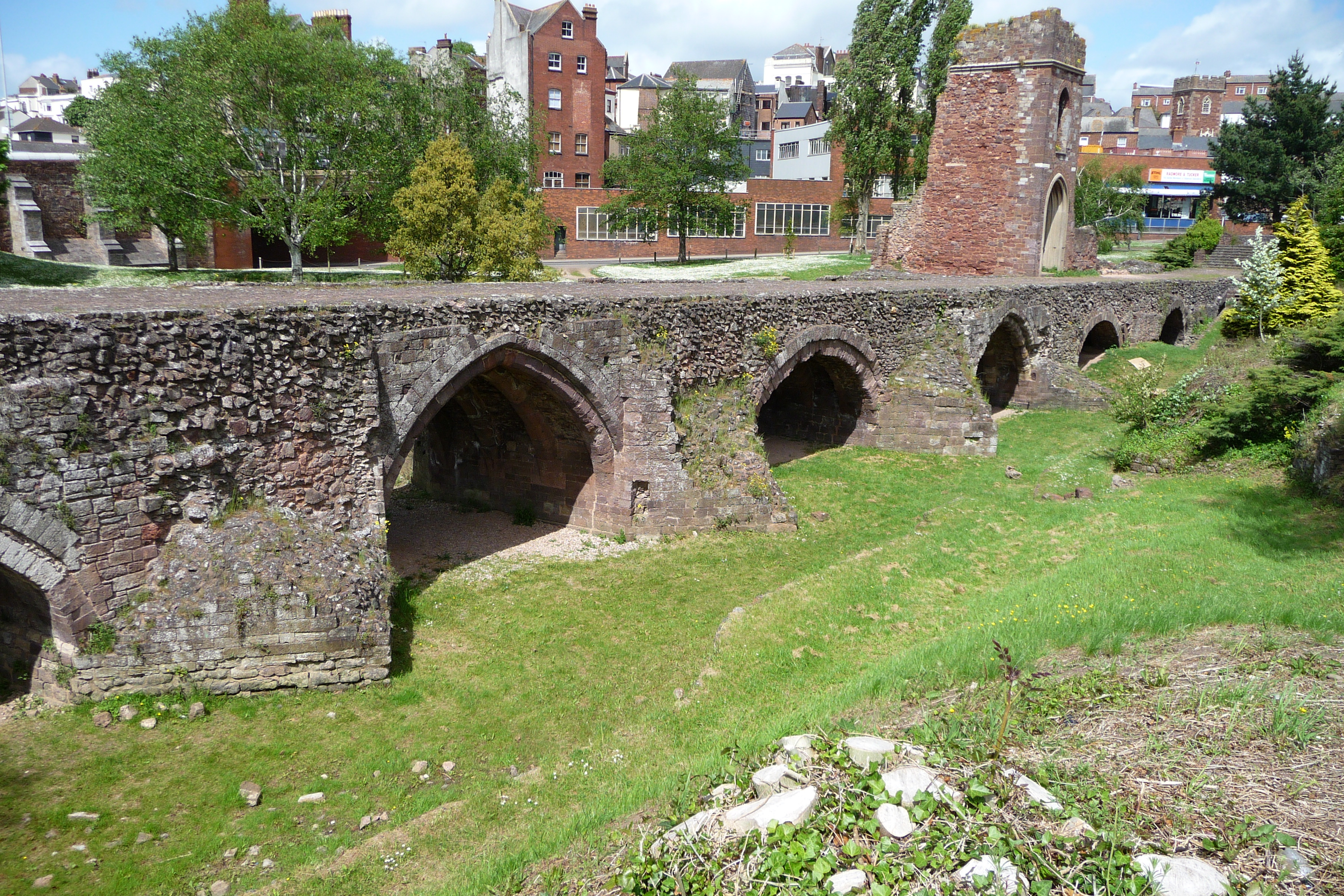
Remains of the medieval Exe Bridge, built around 1200

Exeter was relatively prosperous by the end of the High Middle Ages. The city held a weekly market from at least 1213, and by 1281 Exeter was the only town in the South West to have three market days per week. There are also records of seven annual fairs, the earliest of which dates from 1130, and all of which continued until at least the early 16th century. Until the expulsion of the Jews of England in 1290, Exeter was home to England's most westerly Jewish community. Sophisticated aqueduct systems brought drinking water into the city from springs in the neighbouring parish of St Sidwell's, partially via a network of tunnels, or underground passages.

=== Early modern ===
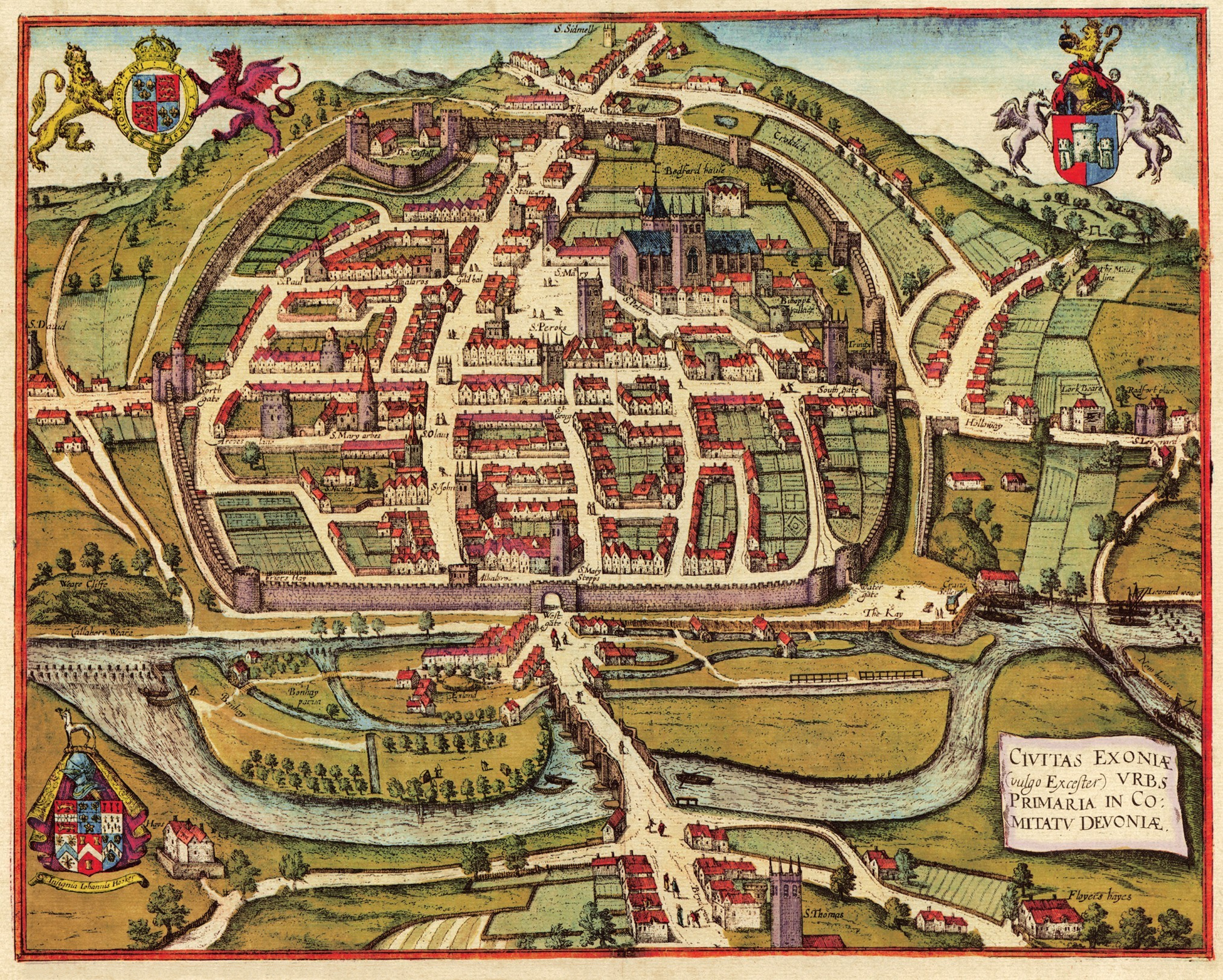
An illustration of Exeter in 1563, entitled Civitas Exoniae (vulgo Excester) urbs primaria in comitatu Devoniae

In 1537, the city was made a county corporate. In 1549, the city successfully withstood a month-long siege by the so-called Prayer Book rebels. The insurgents occupied its suburbs, burnt down two of the city gates and attempted to undermine the city walls, but eventually abandoned the siege after being defeated by the army of Edward VI. From 1555 to 1568, John Hooker was chamberlain of the city and oversaw several schemes, including provisions for orphans.

Exeter was secured for Parliament at the beginning of the English Civil War, but it remained under pressure from the Royalists until, in September 1643, it was captured by the Cornish Royalist Army led by Prince Maurice. Queen Henrietta Maria stayed in Exeter for the birth of her youngest daughter, Henrietta, in 1644. The city was one of the final Royalist cities to fall into Parliamentarian hands, its surrender being negotiated in April 1646 at Poltimore House by Thomas Fairfax.

During this period, Exeter was an economically powerful city, with a strong trade of wool. This was partly due to the surrounding area which was "more fertile and better inhabited than that passed over the preceding day" according to Count Lorenzo Magalotti who visited the city when he was 26 years old. Magalotti writes of over thirty thousand people being employed in the county of Devon as part of the wool and cloth industries, merchandise that was sold to "the West Indies, Spain, France and Italy". Celia Fiennes also visited Exeter during this period, in the early 18th century. She remarked on the "vast trade" and "incredible quantity" in Exeter, recording that "it turns the most money in a week of anything in England", between £10,000 and £15,000.

=== Late modern and contemporary ===
The Industrial Revolution largely bypassed Exeter due to the scarcity of nearby coal deposits, although industry did develop on the basis of locally available agricultural products; a site was established on drained marshland to the west of the city, at Exe Island, to make use of hydropower. Extensive canal redevelopments expanded Exeter's economy, and in 1778 a new bridge replaced the 500-year-old Old Exe Bridge.

In 1832, Exeter was struck by a cholera pandemic. The Victorian era saw several improvements made to the city's infrastructure. In 1844, the Bristol and Exeter Railway opened Exeter St Davids railway station on the city's western edge. The first horse-drawn trams in Exeter were introduced in 1882 with three lines radiating from the East Gate. Electricity was first provided by the Exeter Electric Light Company, formed at the end of the 1880s, and the sewerage system was renovated during the 1890s. In 1887, a fire at the Theatre Royal killed 186 people, in one of the worst theatre disasters in United Kingdom history.

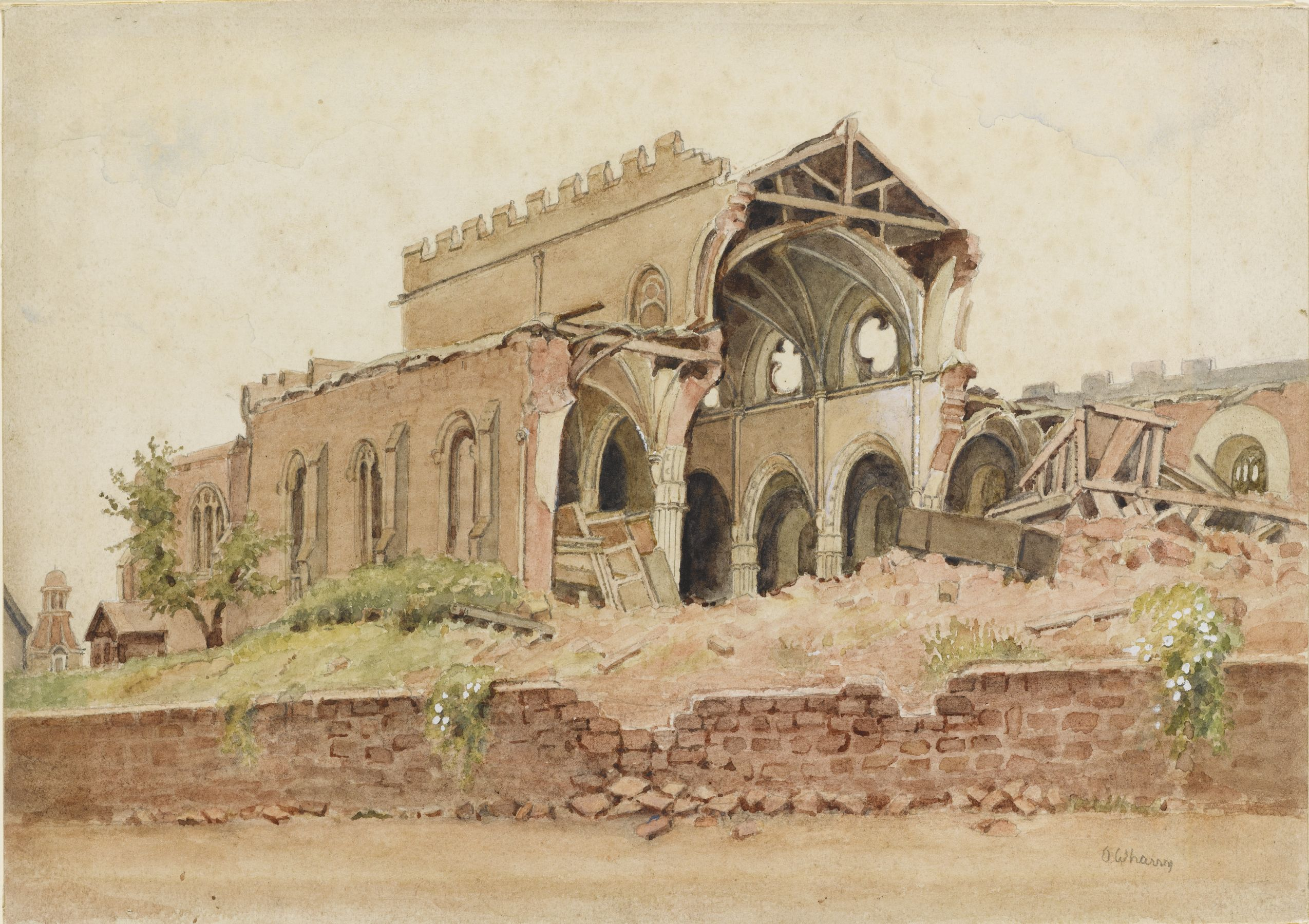
Watercolour by Olive Wharry c. 1942 depicting St Sidwell's Church after the Blitz. A 250 kilograms (550 lb) bomb struck the church in the early hours of 4 May 1942, leaving the tower standing but fatally weakened. It was subsequently demolished. (Collection of the Royal Albert Memorial Museum)

During World War II, Exeter was subjected to air raids by the German Luftwaffe as part of the Baedeker Blitz. Roughly 40 acres (16 ha) of the city was destroyed and a total of 156 people were killed in the raids. The city was defended by No. 307 Polish Night Fighter Squadron, known as the "Lwów Eagle Owls", based at Exeter Airport. Post-war rebuilding often made limited effort to preserve historic structures, resulting in the loss of landmarks such as St Lawrence Church, the College of the Vicars Choral, and Bedford Circus, although buildings such as The House That Moved did survive.

On 27 October 1960, following exceptional rainfall, the River Exe burst its banks, flooding large parts of Exeter, including Exwick, St Thomas, and Alphington. The construction of new flood defences for the city began in 1965 and took 12 years to complete. The scheme included three flood relief channels and two new concrete bridges, completed in 1969 and 1972, replacing the earlier Exe Bridge which had impeded river flow and exacerbated flooding.

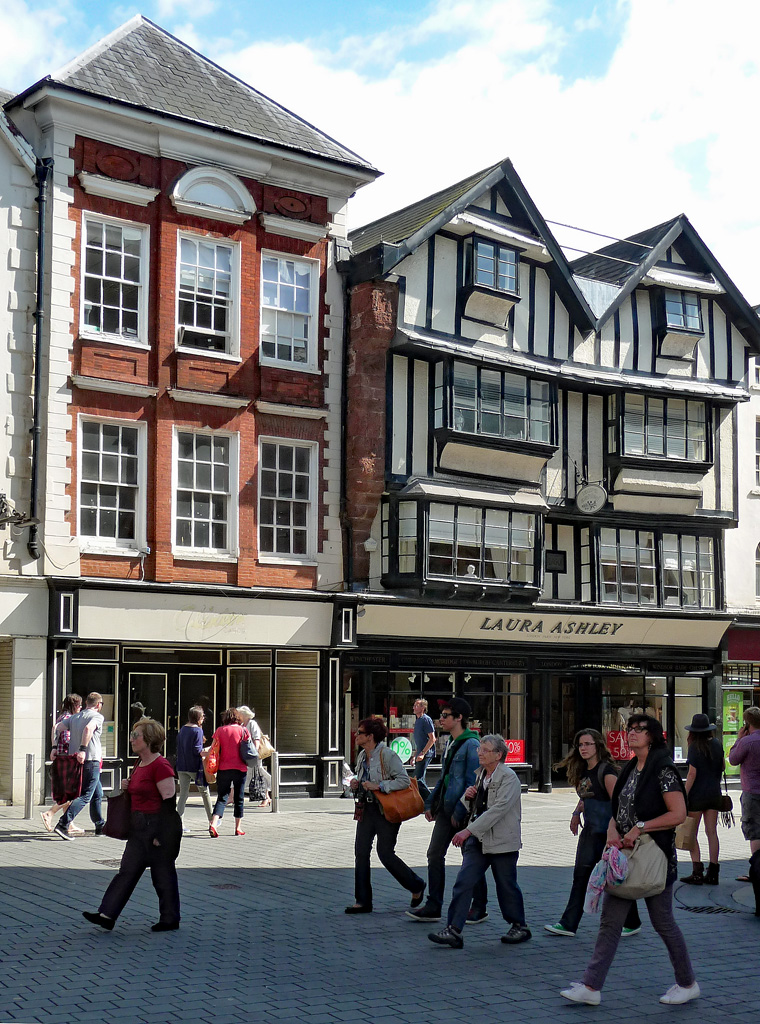
Stores on Exeter's High Street in 2014

Between 2005 and 2007, an area adjoining the Cathedral Close and the High Street was controversially redeveloped into the Princesshay shopping centre. In 2015, a £30 million flood defence improvement scheme was approved following a review by the Environment Agency. On 28 October 2016, a major fire destroyed large parts of the Royal Clarence Hotel and adjoining historic buildings in the Cathedral Close. In 2019, Exeter was made a UNESCO City of Literature. Exeter has relatively high levels of rough sleeping compared with other English local authorities; it recorded the largest absolute increase in the estimated number of people sleeping rough on a single night in autumn from 2024 to 2025.

== Governance ==
=== Parliamentary elections ===
Exeter is one of the oldest extant parliamentary constituencies in the United Kingdom, having been in continuous existence since the Model Parliament of 1295. As an ancient parliamentary borough, Exeter elected two members to the unreformed House of Commons until 1918, when it was reduced to one MP by the Redistribution of Seats Act 1885.

Historically, the city was covered by a single constituency of the same name, but since the 2023 redrawing of boundaries three wards (Pinhoe, St Loyes, and Topsham) now belong to Exmouth and Exeter East. From 1910 to 1997, Exeter elected Conservative MPs in all but two elections: 1929 and 1966. Following the 1997 General Election, Exeter has elected Labour MPs; following the most recent general election in 2024, the incumbent is Steve Race. Exmouth and Exeter East was first contested in the 2024 general election, electing the Conservative MP David Reed.

=== Local government ===
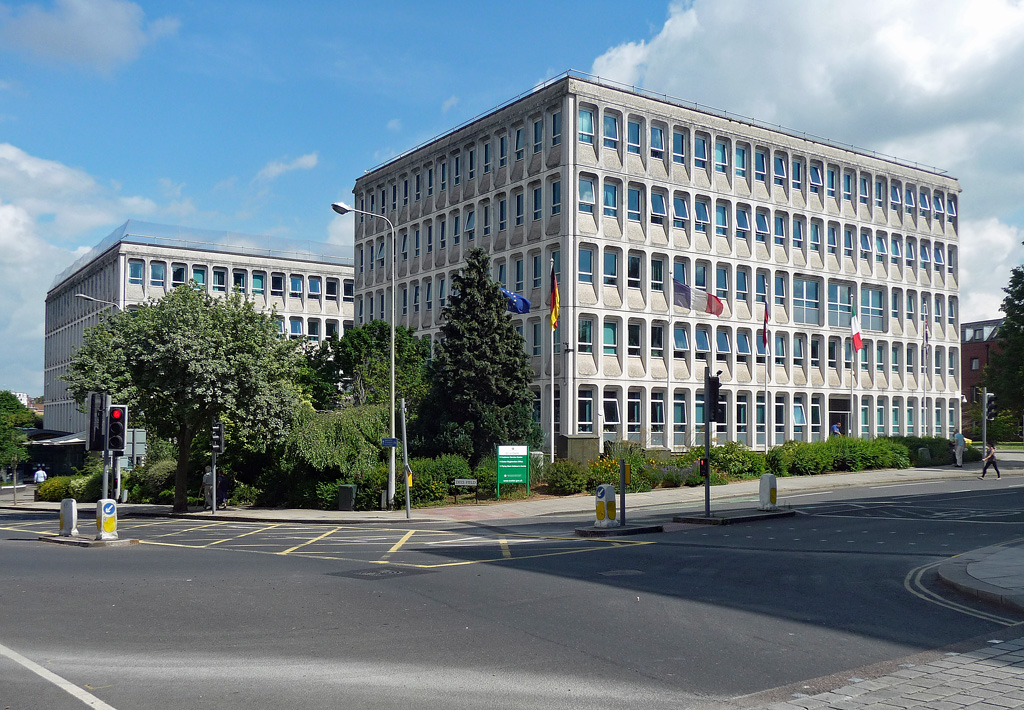
The main offices for Exeter City Council at the Civic Centre

Exeter is governed locally under a two-tier system, in which the city council (a non-metropolitan district authority) shares responsibility with Devon County Council. In 2026, the UK government consulted on proposals to replace this with a unitary authority, as part of a reorganisation of local government in England. The planned unitary authority will incorporate 49 additional parishes currently part of the Teignbridge, East Devon and Mid Devon districts. A previous bid for unitary authority status was blocked by ministers in May 2010, having been approved months before.

From Saxon times, Exeter was in the hundred of Wonford. The city has had a mayor since at least 1207 and was the third oldest 'Right Worshipful' Mayoralty in England after those of Winchester and the City of London. Councillor Granville Baldwin became the first Lord Mayor of Exeter on 1 May 2002 when Letters Patent were awarded to the city during a visit by Elizabeth II, as part of her Golden Jubilee. The Lord Mayor is elected each year from amongst the 39 Exeter city councillors and is non-political for the term of office.

=== Coat of arms ===
The coat of arms includes a depiction of Rougemont Castle as triangular with three towers. The supporters are two winged horses or pegasuses. The wings are charged with blue waves representing the River Exe. The crest wreath is black and gold, the colours of the Duchy of Cornwall. The crest is a red crowned lion holding a golden orb, for Richard of Cornwall. The Arms bear the motto "Semper Fidelis" (Latin: Always faithful).

Coat of arms of Exeter
Notes Granted 1564. Crest On a wreath or and sable, a demi-lion rampant gules, crowned or, holding between the paws a mound of the last, banded azure, and surmounted with a cross botonnee gold. Escutcheon Party per pale gules and sable, a triangular castle with three towers Or. Supporters On either side a pegasus with wings inverted argent, maned and unguled or, charged on the wing with three bars wavy azure.

== Geography ==
=== Physical geography ===
Exeter was established on the eastern bank of the River Exe on a ridge of land backed by a steep hill. It is at this point that the Exe, having just been joined by the River Creedy, opens onto a wide flood plain and estuary which makes the area flood-prone. Historically this was the lowest bridging point of the Exe, which was tidal and navigable up to the city until the construction of weirs later in its history. The Exe Estuary begins south of the city and runs for approximately eight miles before it reaches the English Channel.

Exeter sits predominantly on sandstone and conglomerate geology, although the structure of the surrounding areas is varied. The topography of the ridge which forms the backbone of the city includes a volcanic plug, on which the Rougemont Castle is situated. The cathedral is located on the edge of this ridge and is therefore visible for a considerable distance.

=== Climate ===
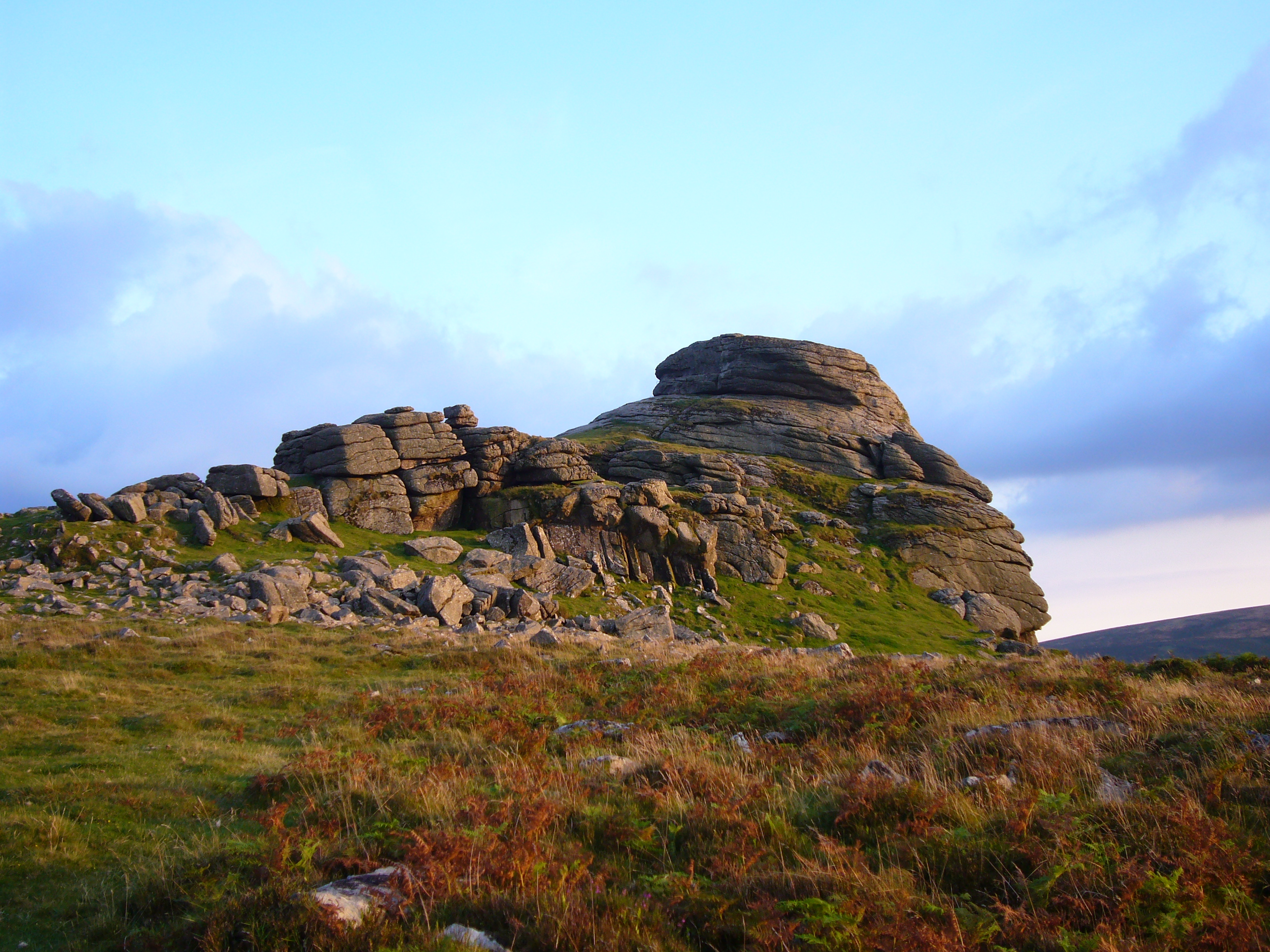
Exeter's climate is affected by the nearby upland area of Dartmoor (Haytor pictured)

Exeter shares with the rest of South West England an oceanic climate, according to the Köppen climate classification, which is typified by frequent cloudy skies, mild winters with generally warm summers and precipitation all year round, especially in winter. Compared with the rest of the country, it is generally wetter and milder. Much of the rainfall in Exeter is caused by Atlantic depressions, especially in autumn and winter, or by convection. Average annual rainfall is around 829.16 millimetres (32.644 in). Compared with some other areas in the region, Exeter experiences less rainfall because it sits in the rain shadow of Dartmoor, an area of upland.

In common with the rest of the South West, the seasonal temperature variation in Exeter is less extreme than in most of the United Kingdom due to the proximity of the sea. The hottest month is July with an average high of 21.8 °C (71.2 °F), and the coldest month is January with an average high of 9.1 °C (48.4 °F). The highest recorded temperature in Exeter stands at 34.0 °C (93.2 °F) recorded in June 2026, while the lowest recorded temperature is −16.5 °C (2.3 °F) recorded in December 2010. The annual sunshine (hours) is 1561.55, which is higher than the average for the region.

Increasingly long and frequent summer heat waves and droughts in recent years, exacerbated by climate change, have been pronounced in Exeter. During the 2026 United Kingdom heatwaves, Exeter and Usk were the final locations to exit the July heatwave, when temperatures fell below their threshold after 21 consecutive days.

Climate data for Exeter Airport (EXT), elevation: 27 m (89 ft), 1991–2020 normals, extremes 1958–present
Month	Jan	Feb	Mar	Apr	May	Jun	Jul	Aug	Sep	Oct	Nov	Dec	Year
Record high °C (°F)	16.5 (61.7)	16.1 (61.0)	20.9 (69.6)	23.8 (74.8)	30.9 (87.6)	34.0 (93.2)	32.5 (90.5)	33.3 (91.9)	28.5 (83.3)	25.9 (78.6)	18.5 (65.3)	15.9 (60.6)	34.0 (93.2)
Mean daily maximum °C (°F)	9.1 (48.4)	9.4 (48.9)	11.3 (52.3)	13.8 (56.8)	17.1 (62.8)	20.0 (68.0)	21.8 (71.2)	21.6 (70.9)	19.3 (66.7)	15.5 (59.9)	12.0 (53.6)	9.4 (48.9)	15.0 (59.0)
Daily mean °C (°F)	5.9 (42.6)	5.9 (42.6)	7.4 (45.3)	9.3 (48.7)	12.2 (54.0)	15.2 (59.4)	17.0 (62.6)	16.9 (62.4)	14.6 (58.3)	11.6 (52.9)	8.2 (46.8)	6.0 (42.8)	10.9 (51.6)
Mean daily minimum °C (°F)	2.6 (36.7)	2.4 (36.3)	3.5 (38.3)	4.8 (40.6)	7.3 (45.1)	10.4 (50.7)	12.1 (53.8)	12.1 (53.8)	9.9 (49.8)	7.8 (46.0)	4.4 (39.9)	2.7 (36.9)	6.7 (44.1)
Record low °C (°F)	−15.0 (5.0)	−9.3 (15.3)	−9.6 (14.7)	−4.6 (23.7)	−2.3 (27.9)	0.8 (33.4)	2.0 (35.6)	1.9 (35.4)	−1.1 (30.0)	−5.2 (22.6)	−6.6 (20.1)	−16.5 (2.3)	−16.5 (2.3)
Average precipitation mm (inches)	85.6 (3.37)	65.1 (2.56)	62.3 (2.45)	61.4 (2.42)	51.0 (2.01)	53.8 (2.12)	48.2 (1.90)	64.1 (2.52)	60.3 (2.37)	92.5 (3.64)	95.3 (3.75)	90.1 (3.55)	829.2 (32.65)
Average precipitation days (≥ 1.0 mm)	12.4	10.4	10.2	9.9	9.7	7.4	7.8	7.9	8.8	12.1	12.6	12.0	121.1
Average relative humidity (%)	87	84	81	78	78	77	76	78	82	85	87	88	82
Average dew point °C (°F)	4 (39)	4 (39)	5 (41)	6 (43)	8 (46)	11 (52)	13 (55)	13 (55)	11 (52)	9 (48)	7 (45)	5 (41)	8 (46)
Mean monthly sunshine hours	58.4	82.7	117.1	167.4	195.5	194.7	193.8	171.8	151.2	106.8	69.5	52.6	1,561.6
Source 1: Met Office (precipitation days 1981-2010)
Source 2: Starlings Roost Weather Time and Date

== Demography ==
Population pyramid of Exeter (district) in 2021

The mid-year estimate for 2024 by the Office for National Statistics put Exeter's district area population at 138,399. Between the last two censuses (held in 2011 and 2021), the population of Exeter increased by 11.0%, from around 117,800 in 2011 to around 130,700 in 2021. This was a greater percentage increase than was experienced by the overall population of the South West (7.8%) and by the overall population of England (up 6.6% since the 2011 Census).

The Exeter Urban Area had a population of 124,079 in 2014, compared with 124,328 for the city and borough of Exeter. While the Exeter Metropolitan Area had a population of 467,257 in the same year and includes Exeter along with Teignbridge, Mid Devon and East Devon. Out of all the Devon districts, Exeter receives the largest number of commuters from East Devon, followed by Teignbridge. Most of the city's ethnic minority population live in the central, northwestern and eastern suburbs of the city. Outlying areas such as Pinhoe, Cowick and the expensive suburb of Topsham are all 95% White British as of 2011.

=== Ethnicity ===
In 2021, 90.3% of people in Exeter identified their ethnic group within the "White" category (compared with 93.1% in 2011), 4.9% within the "Asian, Asian British or Asian Welsh" category (up from 3.9% in 2011), and 2.5% identified within the "Mixed or Multiple" category (compared with 1.6% in 2011). The median age in 2024 was 35 years, remaining unchanged from 2011 and 2021. In 2021, 48.5% of Exeter residents reported having "No religion", making it the most common response in this local authority area (up from 34.7% in 2011) and higher than the percentage reporting this in the South West and across England (which increased from 29.3% to 44.1%, and from 24.8% to 36.7%, respectively).

Ethnicity of Exeter from 1991 to 2021:

Ethnic Group	Year							
Ethnic Group	1991		2001		2011		2021	
Ethnic Group	Number	%	Number	%	Number	%	Number	%
White: Total	96,811	98.7%	108,459	97.6%	109,590	93.1%	118,034	90.3%
White: British	–	–	105,231	94.7%	104,013	88.3%	108,095	82.7%
White: Irish	–	–	668		629		875	0.7%
White: Gypsy or Irish Traveller	–	–	–	–	93		100	0.1%
White: Roma							181	0.1%
White: Other	–	–	2,560	2.3%	4,855	4.1%	8,783	6.7%
Asian or Asian British: Total	663	0.7%	1,107	1%	4,595	3.9%	6,375	4.8%
Asian or Asian British: Indian	212		284		946		1,588	1.2%
Asian or Asian British: Pakistani	37		67		164		274	0.2%
Asian or Asian British: Bangladeshi	80		142		227		513	0.4%
Asian or Asian British: Chinese	185		378		1,998		2,020	1.5%
Asian or Asian British: Other Asian	149		236		1,260		1,980	1.5%
Black or Black British: Total	202	0.3%	225	0.2%	667	0.6%	1,137	0.9%
Black or Black British: Caribbean	51		62		128		893	0.7%
Black or Black British: African	76		142		492		137	0.1%
Black or Black British: Other Black	75		21		47		107	0.1%
Mixed or British Mixed: Total	–	–	924	1%	1,938	1.6%	3,308	2.6%
Mixed: White and Black Caribbean	–	–	179		403		503	0.4%
Mixed: White and Black African	–	–	108		278		484	0.4%
Mixed: White and Asian	–	–	350		773		1305	1.0%
Mixed: Other Mixed	–	–	287		484		1016	0.8%
Other: Total	449	0.5%	361	0.3%	983	0.8%	1,853	1.4%
Other: Arab	–	–	–	–	659		802	0.6%
Other: Any other ethnic group	449	0.5%	361	0.3%	324		1,051	0.8%
Other: Ethnic Jew	220	0.3%	281	0.35%	321	0.3%	442	0.3%
Total	98,125	100%	111,076	100%	117,773	100%	130,707	100%

=== Religion ===
In the 2021 census, 48.5% of people in Exeter reported having "No religion", making it the most common response in this local authority area. This was up from 34.7% in 2011, and consistent with the trend across the South West and across England as a whole. 40.0% of people described themselves as Christian (down from 53.9%), while 7.4% did not state their religion (down from 8.1% in 2011).

Religious affiliation in Exeter from 2001 to 2021:

Religion	2001		2011		2021	
Religion	Number	%	Number	%	Number	%
Holds religious beliefs	78,839	70.9	67,382	57.2	57,697	44.1
Christian	76,773	69.1	63,486	53.9	52,221	40.0
Buddhist	375	0.3	683	0.6	715	0.5
Hindu	123	0.1	372	0.3	698	0.5
Judaism	152	0.1	155	0.1	201	0.2
Muslim	858	0.8	1,855	1.6	2,815	2.2
Sikh	76	0.1	160	0.1	179	0.1
Other religion	482	0.4	671	0.6	868	0.7
(No religion and Religion not stated)	32,237	29.1	50,391	42.8	73,012	55.9
No religion	22,719	20.5	40,862	34.7	63,385	48.5
Religion not stated	9,518	8.6	9,529	8.1	9,627	7.4
Total population	111,076	100.0	117,773	100.0	130,709	100.0

== Economy ==
Exeter generated £5.9 billion gross value added (GVA) in 2022, according to the Centre for Cities; the GVA per hour worked was £35.80, placing it 16th of the 63 cities in the United Kingdom ranked by this measure. Based on a group of economic indicators compiled by the Office for National Statistics from 2023 onwards, Exeter belongs to a cluster of areas defined by a high percentage of children in relative poverty, low rate of active businesses, low gross median weekly pay, low employment rate, low gross value added per hour worked and a low rate of housing completions. A Centre for Cities' 2026 report found that Exeter was among the worst performers in the United Kingdom for improving living standards over the ten years from 2013 to 2023.

Exeter ranked fourth out of 50 in PwC's Good Growth for Cities Index (2025), scoring particularly highly for its jobs and skills. Exeter has been identified among the top ten most profitable locations for a business to be based. As of 2022, 39% of Exeter workers are in professional occupations, much higher than the national average of 26%. However, median pay for full-time workers is below the figure for Great Britain as a whole, though above that for South West England.

Notable employers in Exeter include the Met Office, the University of Exeter, Devon County Council, Royal Devon University Healthcare NHS Foundation Trust, and South West Water. The university is the largest international export sector for the city and employs a large portion of those working in high-skilled (knowledge sector) jobs. The Exeter Science Park opened in 2015 as a centre of activity for businesses and expects the companies sited there to have contributed £350 million to the local economy once it is completed by the late 2030s.

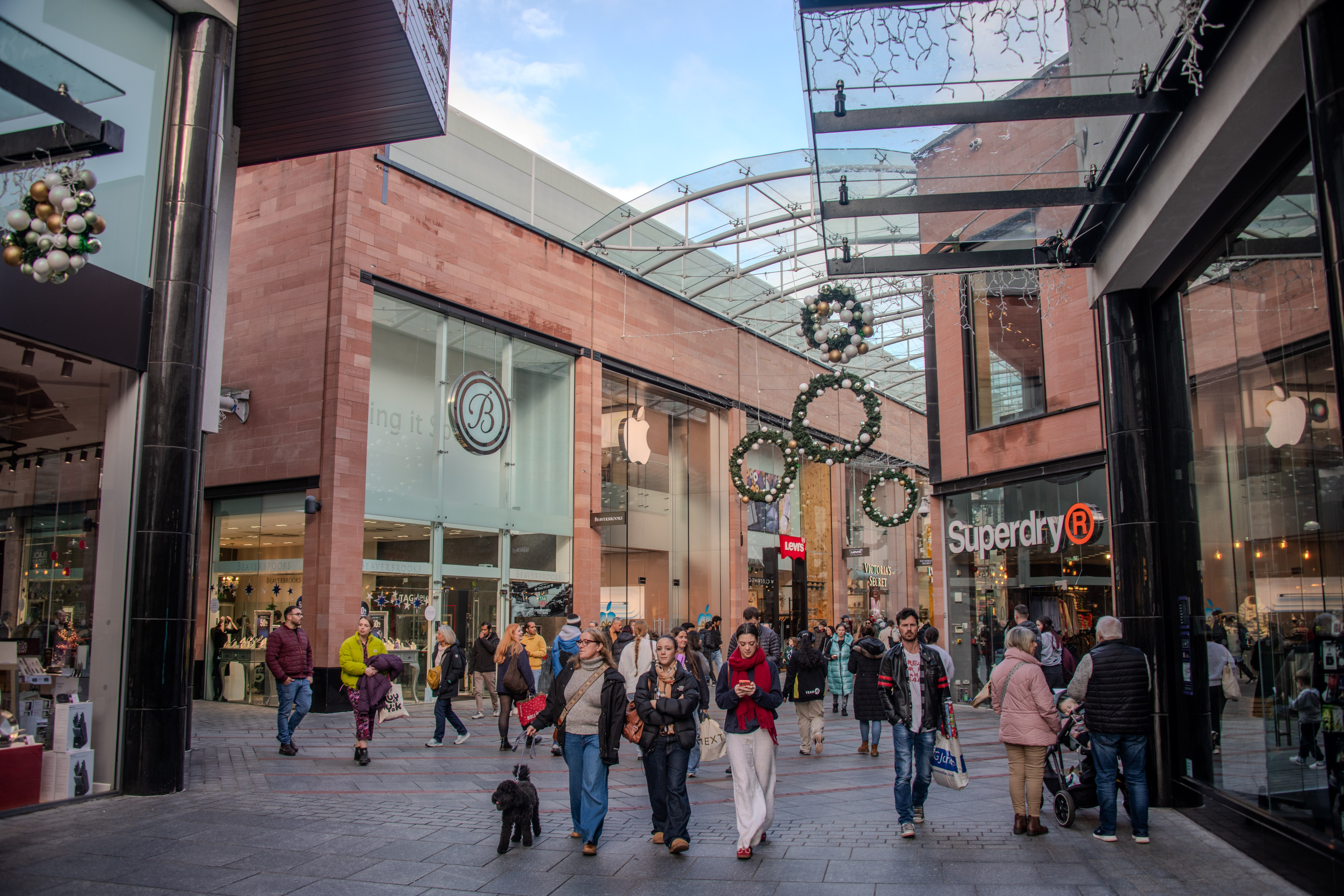
Princesshay Shopping Centre

Shopping is centred on the High Street and two shopping centres, the pedestrianised Princesshay and indoor Guildhall, which offer a wide range of major retailers. Independent retailers are concentrated in the adjoining streets, such as Fore Street and Gandy Street. Historically, Exeter has been criticised for its overabundance of chain stores and lack of diversity in categories of other shops, leading the New Economics Foundation to brand it a clone town in 2005 and 2010. In 2024, Exeter's High Street was ranked as one of the UK's most appealing. Since 2004, Exeter has held Fairtrade City status.

Tourism is relatively less important to Exeter's economy compared to the local area, with only 7% of employment dependent on tourism compared with 13% for the county of Devon (2005 figures). In 2024, domestic and overseas tourism spend was £68 and £43 million, respectively, as compared to £231 and £47 million for Torbay (the area with the largest spend).

Exeter is a major commuter town, with around 35,000 people commuting into the city on a daily basis. Exeter provides services, employment and shopping for local residents within the city limits and also from nearby towns in Teignbridge, Mid Devon and East Devon, together sometimes known as the Exeter & Heart of Devon area (EHOD). Exeter therefore provides for the EHOD area population of 457,400. The "Exeter Growth Point" strategy includes plans to build on land in the Teignbridge and East Devon areas, which border Exeter's boundaries. This includes the new town of Cranbrook, located about five mi (eight km) east of the city, which is now home to several thousand residents.

== Transport ==
=== Air ===
Exeter Airport (IATA: EXT, ICAO: EGTE) lies east of the city. It offers direct flights to domestic and European destinations through operators such as Loganair, TUI, and Ryanair. It also offers indirect flights to further destinations by connections via Amsterdam Schiphol Airport and Dublin Airport. The airport handled 572,000 passengers in 2025.

The regional airline Flybe (previously called Jersey European and British European) was based at the airport until its collapse in 2020.

=== Buses ===
Local bus services are mainly operated by Stagecoach South West. Dartline Coaches and Greenslades are minor operators in the city, with Country Bus serving semi-regular services to Moretonhampstead. The South West Falcon coach service runs from Plymouth through Exeter to Taunton, Bristol Airport, and Bristol city centre. Many services originate from the bus station; the existing building was opened in July 2021, replacing a building that had operated since 1964.

=== Canal ===
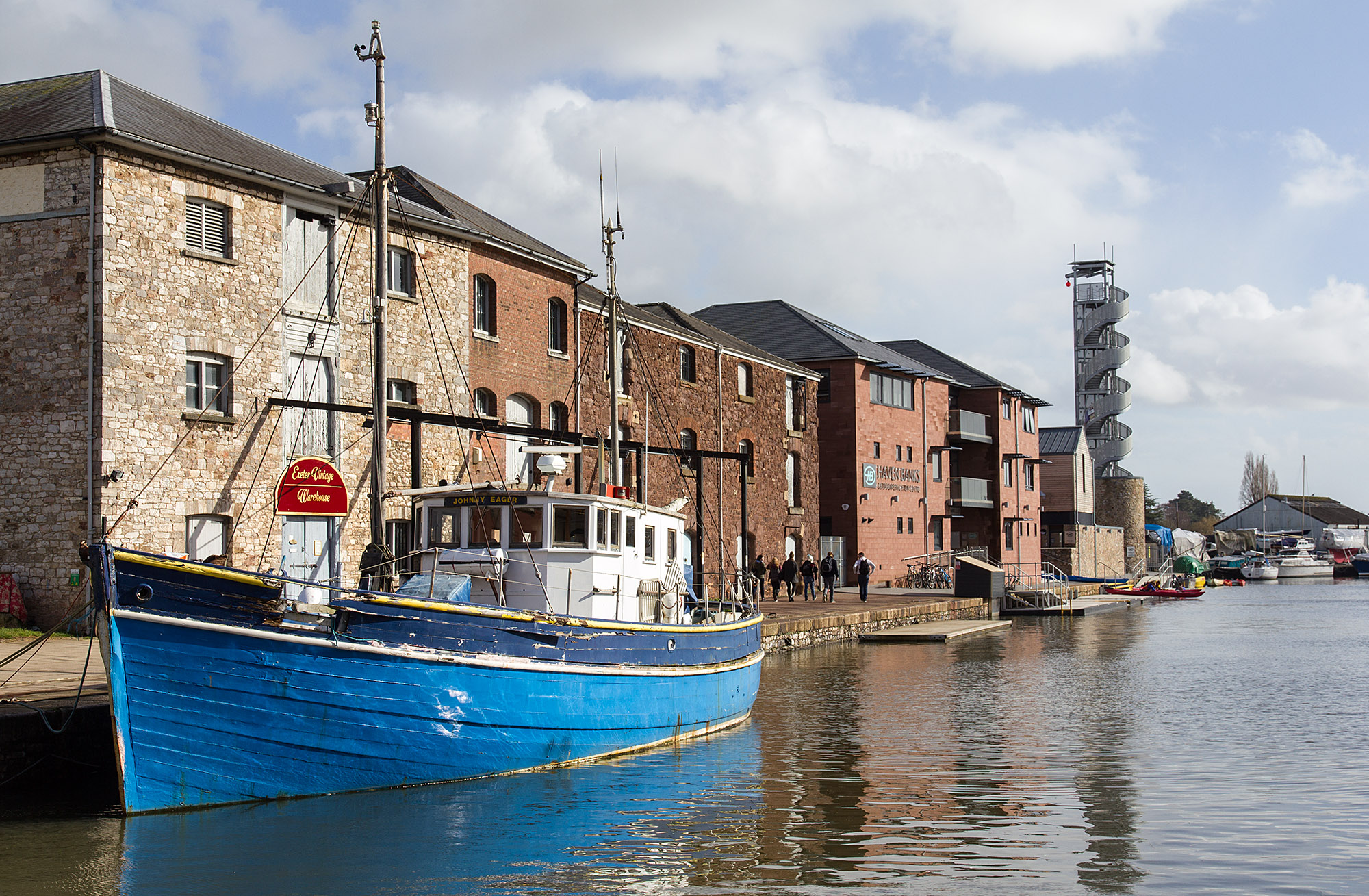
Exeter Canal Basin

First constructed in about 1566, the Exeter Ship Canal (also known as the Exeter Canal) is one of the oldest artificial waterways in Britain and the first to feature pound locks. It was cut to bypass the St James' Weir that had been built across the River Exe at Duckes Marsh, which forced boats to unload at Topsham and pay tolls to the Earls of Devon to transport goods on to Exeter. The canal was widened and deepened in 1677 and 1701. The last commercial use of the canal was in 1972; it is now widely used for leisure purposes.

In 2025, Exeter City Council began consulting on options to replace two bridges over the canal, which are nearing their end of life. Proposals to replace these with bascule bridges without raising the height to permit pedestrian and water traffic underneath the crossings, or potential freight, has been criticised by groups that use the canal. The air draft of the existing bridges excludes navigation by almost all vehicles, requiring that the A379 road be interrupted for them to pass.

=== Cycling ===
Exeter is on Route 2 of the National Cycle Network. There are plans to introduce a new bicycle-sharing system to the city in 2026, after a previous scheme operated by Co Bikes closed in 2023.

=== Rail ===
Exeter is served by three main railway stations. Exeter St Davids is served by long distance services to London Paddington and Paignton or Plymouth and Penzance (including the Night Riviera sleeping car service), operated by Great Western Railway. There are also services most hours between Cardiff Central via Bristol Temple Meads and Penzance. Other long-distance services between Bristol, Plymouth and Penzance are operated by CrossCountry between to and from stations in Scotland, the North of England and Midlands such as Glasgow Central, Edinburgh Waverley, York and Birmingham New Street (and less frequently between Manchester Piccadilly and Paignton). Exeter St Davids is a major interchange station within the South West Peninsula's rail network.

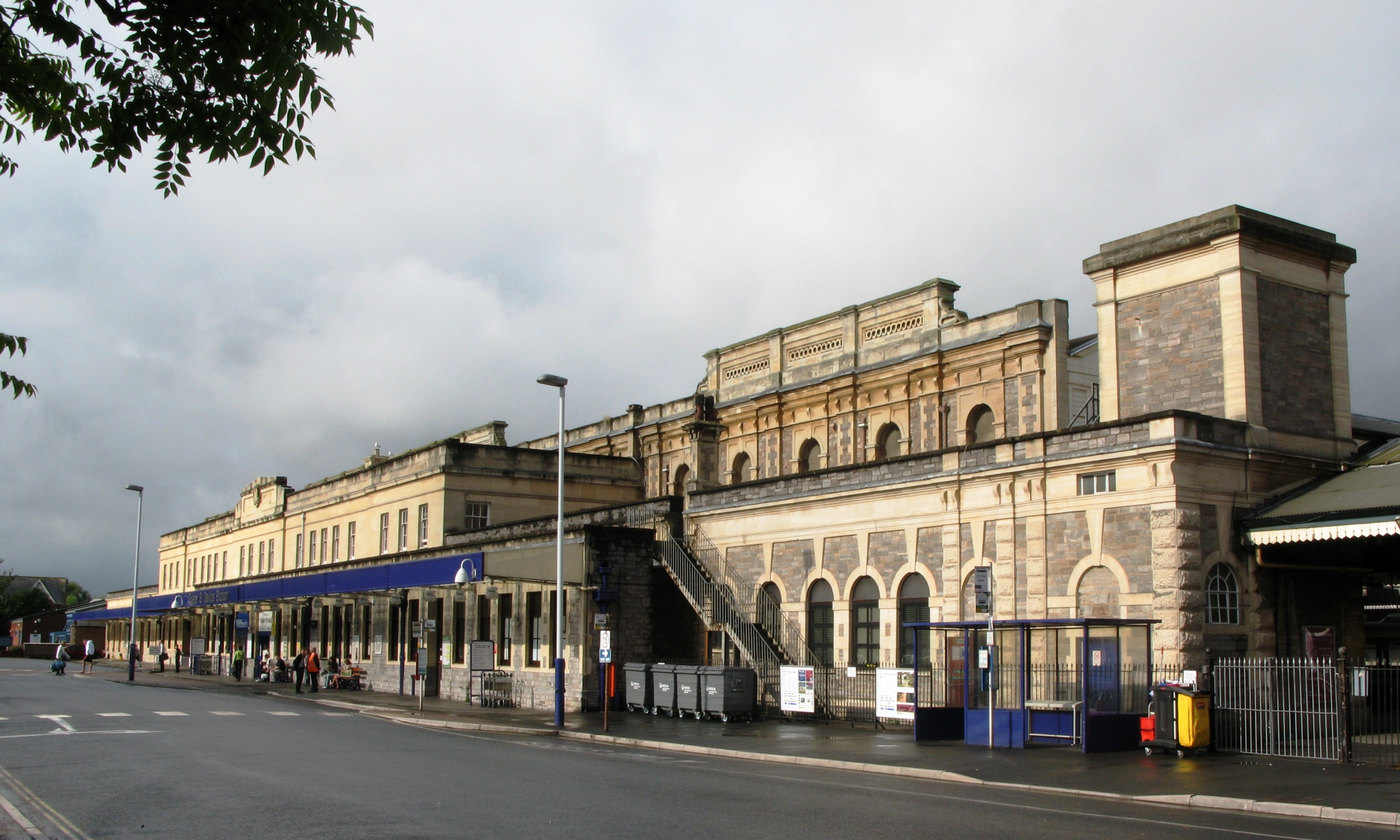
Exeter St Davids railway station

Exeter Central, in the city centre, is served by local services and the West of England Main Line route to London Waterloo. In the south-west of the city, Exeter St Thomas serves the western side of the city. There are also seven suburban stations served only by local services: Topsham, St James Park, Polsloe Bridge, Pinhoe, Digby & Sowton, Marsh Barton and Newcourt; trains from these stations run to Paignton (see Riviera Line), Exmouth (see Avocet Line), Barnstaple (see Tarka Line) and Okehampton (see Dartmoor Line).

The Devon Metro upgrade programme, ongoing since 2011, is planned to gradually bring a rapid transit-style service on Exeter's local rail network using these existing commuter lines. Proposals have been made to reopen the Plymouth to Tavistock section of the Exeter to Plymouth railway of the London and South Western Railway as an alternative to the coastal route, which suffers from recurrent storm damage to the South Devon Railway sea wall.

=== Road ===
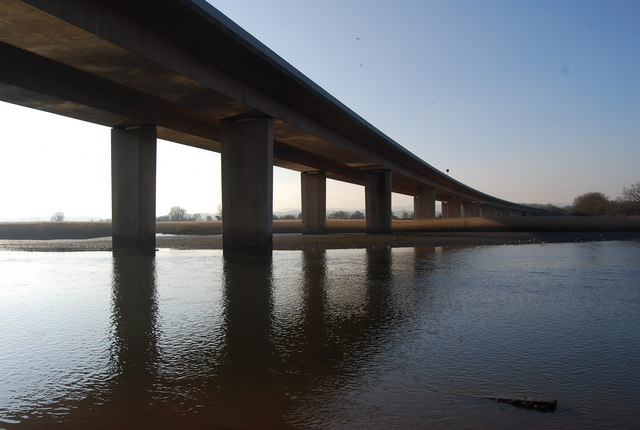
Bridge carrying the M5 motorway across the River Exe

The southwest end of the M5 motorway is at Exminster, just south of Exeter, and runs north past Bristol (where it connects with the M4 to London and South Wales) before reaching its northeast end near Birmingham. The older A30 road provides a more direct route to London via the A303 and M3, and a non-motorway route to Bristol via the A303 and A37. The M5 is the modern lowest bridging point of the River Exe. Going westwards, the A38 connects Exeter to Plymouth and south east Cornwall, whilst the A30 continues via Okehampton to Cornwall and ends at Penzance. The cities of Bristol, Plymouth, Bath, Salisbury and Truro can all be reached within two hours.

Travel by car in the city is often difficult with regular jams centred on the Exe Bridges area. Historically, the bridges were a significant bottleneck for holiday traffic heading to southwest England, leading to the construction of the first bypass in the mid-1930s over Countess Wear Bridge, followed by the M5 in 1977. To further address the problem of congestion in the city centre, Devon County Council opened three park and ride sites near junctions with the M5, and in 2006 considered the introduction of congestion charges.

== Education ==
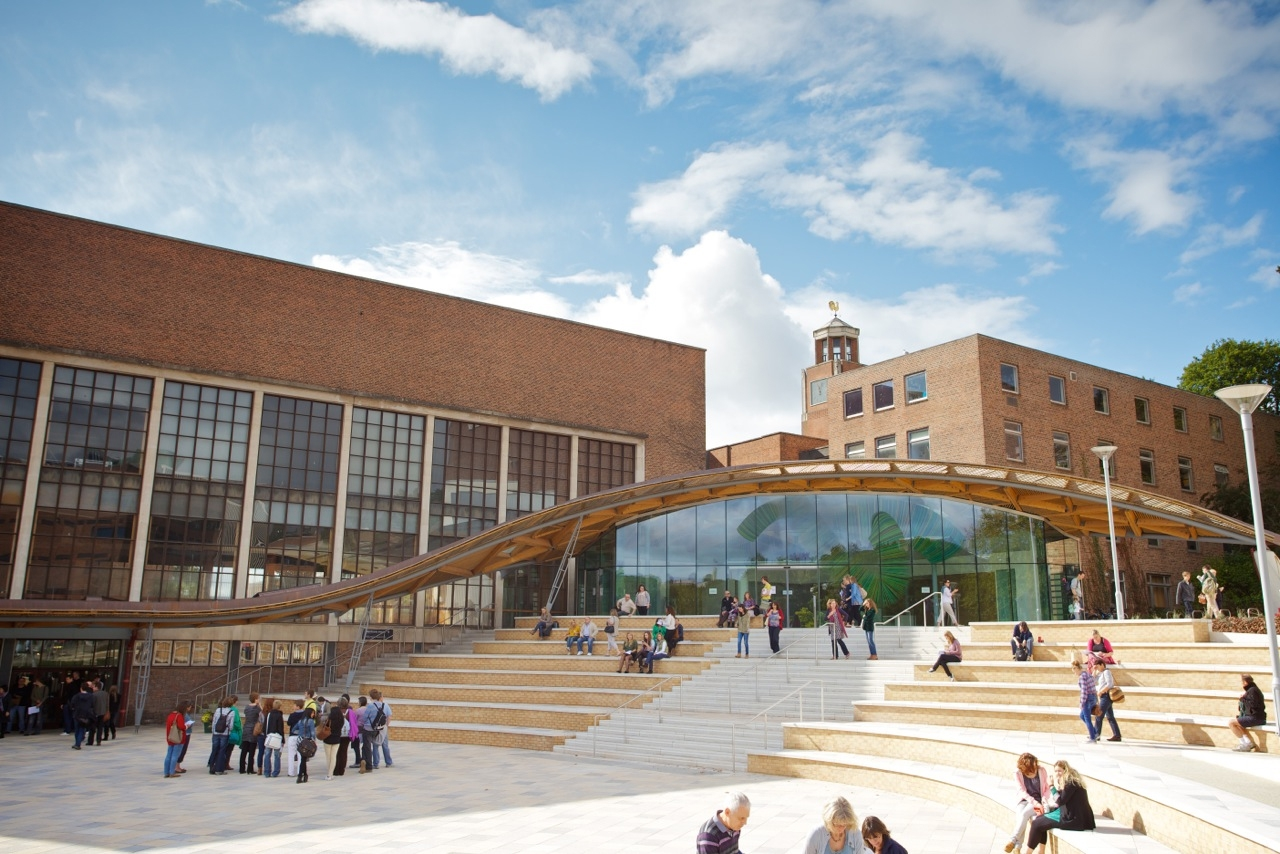
The Great Hall and piazza at Streatham Campus, University of Exeter

Exeter's sole higher education provider, the University of Exeter, has two campuses in the city: its main campus, Streatham, and St. Luke's, at which Sport and Health Sciences, the Graduate School of Education, and the Medical School are based; its other campus is in Penryn, Cornwall and shared with Falmouth University. The University formally came into existence in 1955 with the receipt of its royal charter, having previously been the University College of the South West, but can trace its origins to predecessor institutions established from 1838 to 1888.

Exeter College offers further education. Established in 1970, it was the first tertiary college in England and Wales. It was also the sole sixth form for the maintained school sector in the city until 2014, when it was joined by the Exeter Mathematics School, a sixth form free school that is co-sponsored by the College and University. Exeter College merged with PETROC (now North Devon College) in 2026 to form the Exeter and North Devon Colleges Group.

Since 2005, following a reorganisation and rebuilding programme, there have been 25 primary schools, four referral schools, three special schools and five secondary schools within Exeter. The secondary schools are Isca Academy, St James School, St Luke's Church of England School, St Peter's Church of England Aided School and West Exe School. The city has a number of independent schools, including Exeter School, Exeter Cathedral School, and The Maynard School. There are several schools serving students with special educational needs in Exeter.

== Sport ==
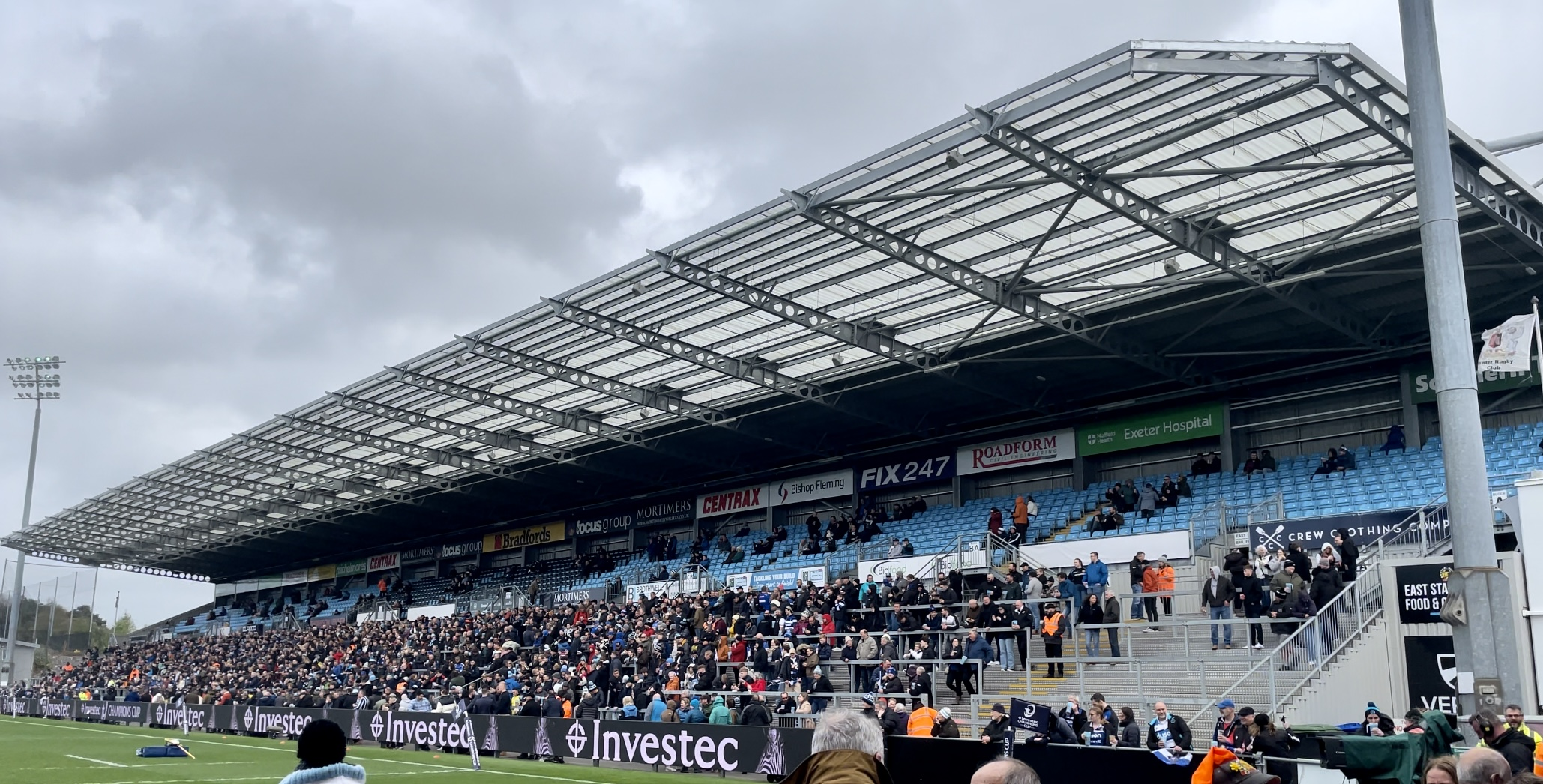
The East Stand at Sandy Park, the home of the rugby union club Exeter Chiefs

The city's professional rugby union team is the Exeter Chiefs. Founded in 1871, as Exeter Rugby Club, the team have played their home games at Sandy Park stadium since 2006 after relocating from County Ground, which had been used from 1905. They have been continuous members of the highest division of English rugby, the Premiership, since 2010. They have been English champions twice, in 2017 and 2020, and Anglo-Welsh Cup winners twice, in 2014 and 2018. In 2020, the club became European Champions for the first time in their history.

The city also has two other clubs: Exeter Athletic, which is located in Exwick, and Exeter Saracens, which is located in Whipton.

Exeter City is Exeter's only professional football club. They have played their home games at St James Park since their formation in 1901. The club were founder members of the Football League's Third Division (south) in 1920, but have never progressed higher than the third tier of the English football league system, and in 2003 were relegated to the Conference; they returned to the EFL after winning the 2008 play-off final. Following relegation in the 2025–26 season, the club currently competes in EFL League Two, the fourth tier of English football.

Exeter Cricket Club administers three teams that play in the Devon Cricket League. The first of these plays in the Premier Division at first XI level, and the next plays at second XI level. The teams play their home games at County Ground, where the club has played since 1902.

Exeter Rowing Club competes both locally and nationally, and has a recorded history originating in the early 19th century. The City of Exeter Rowing Regatta is run annually in July, and is the eldest and largest regatta in the South West, with racing first recorded on the river in the 1860s.

Exeter's speedway team, Exeter Falcons, was established in 1929 and were located at the County Ground until its permanent closure in 2005. The team was revived in 2015, but is currently based in Plymouth. Speedway was also staged briefly at tracks in Alphington and Peamore after the Second World War.

Running events held in the city include the annual Great West Run, now a half marathon but previously a marathon, and the Exeter Marathon.

== Culture ==
=== Arts ===
In recognition of its significant contributions to literature and literary culture, Exeter was made a UNESCO City of Literature in 2019. The Exeter Book, a codex of Old English poetry conserved in Exeter Cathedral, is recognised as "the foundation volume of English literature, one of the world's principal cultural artefacts". Writers with links to the city include Charles Dickens, Sabine Baring-Gould, Jean Rhys, Agatha Christie, Daphne du Maurier, Michael Morpurgo, Hilary Mantel and J. K. Rowling.

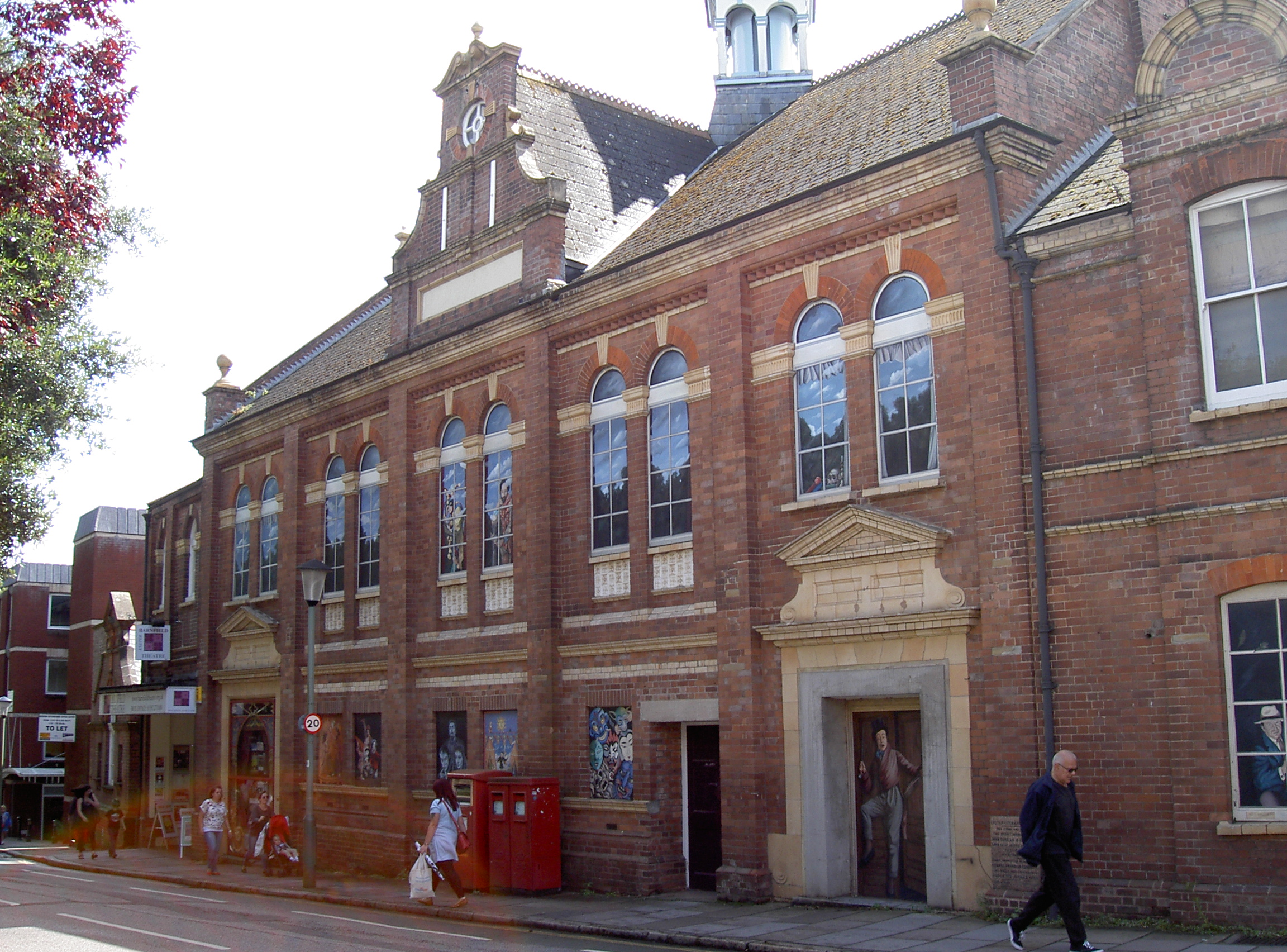
Barnfield Theatre

Exeter has several theatres. The 460-seat Northcott Theatre on the University's Streatham campus runs a mixed programme of events and is one of relatively few provincial English theatres to maintain its own repertory company. The Northcott Theatre also manages the 280-seat Barnfield Theatre in the city centre. The Cygnet Theatre in Friars Walk is the home of the Cygnet Training Theatre and is a member of the Conference of Drama Schools. The 500-capacity Exeter Corn Exchange is the largest venue in the city and hosts other events in addition to its arts programme. Exeter Phoenix hosts a mixed programme of events in a 270 (seated) capacity auditorium, as well as containing studios, galleries and a cinema.

The Royal Albert Memorial Museum houses a collection in areas such as zoology, anthropology, fine art, local and foreign archaeology and geology. The Bill Douglas Cinema Museum on the University's Streatham Campus is one of Britain's largest public collections of books, prints, artefacts and ephemera relating to the history and prehistory of cinema. The University has an extensive fine art collection, selected works from which are displayed on its campuses; its sculpture collection contains works by Barbara Hepworth, Michael Ayrton and Paul Mount, and many are on public display, including as part of a Streatham Campus 'Sculpture Walk'.

The city has several venues for live music. In recent years, the University's Great Hall has hosted concerts by the English pop band Blossoms and English internet personality and musician KSI, among others. Westpoint Exeter, to the east of the city near Exeter Airport, has hosted major artists such as The 1975 and Lewis Capaldi. The Cavern Club has been one of Exeter's primary live music venues since its opening in 1991, hosting artists including Coldplay, Muse, Biffy Clyro, George Ezra, The 1975, Bastille and Kaiser Chiefs. It remains a popular venue for local artists, as well as one of the city's main student nightclubs. The largest orchestra based in Exeter is the EMG Symphony Orchestra.

Musical acts with connections to Exeter include Chris Martin, the lead singer of rock band Coldplay, who was born in Exeter and grew up in the nearby village of Whitestone. The band has frequently returned to Exeter to perform, including during BBC Radio 1's Big Weekend in 2016, hosted at nearby Powderham Castle. The members of rock band Muse were born and raised in nearby Teignmouth, and some of the band's earliest performances were at the Cavern Club. Thom Yorke, lead singer of rock band Radiohead, attended the University in the early 1990s; he performed multiple gigs and DJed on campus, as well as helping to set up the Cavern Club.

=== Architecture ===
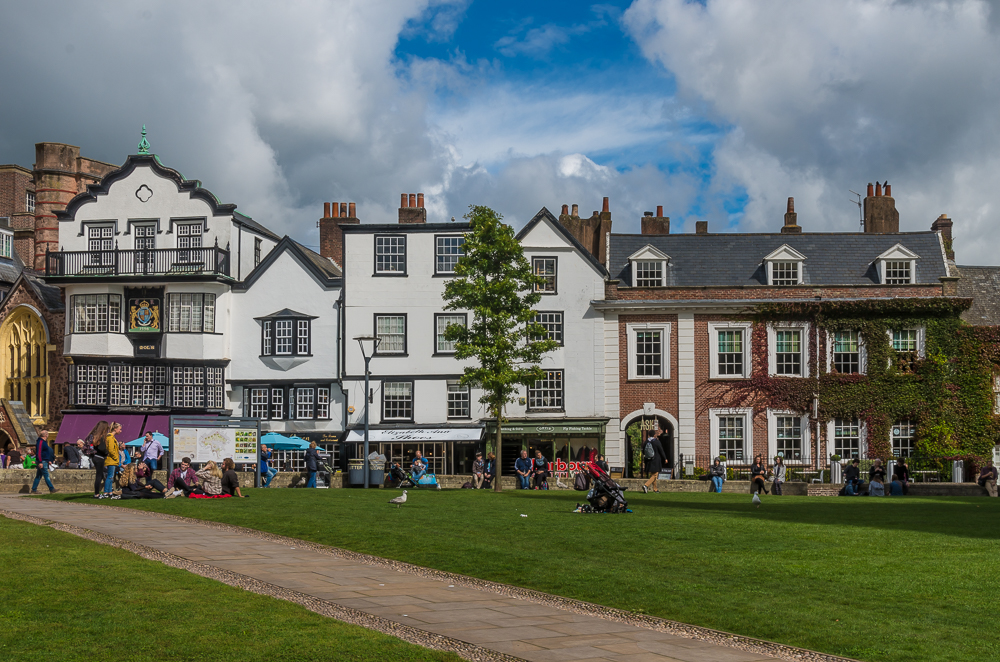
From left to right, the 15th-century St Martin's Church, 16th-century Mol's Coffee House and 17th-century Nos 2–5 Cathedral Close

Exeter has over 1,800 listed buildings, many of them Grade I and Grade II*. Most architectural periods of the United Kingdom are represented by buildings in the city, particularly the medieval, Tudor and Georgian periods.

St Nicholas' Priory was founded in 1087 as a Benedictine monastery, but parts were destroyed during the dissolution of the monasteries. Exeter Cathedral was founded in 1050, although the present building dates from approximately 1400. It is considered a superb example of the Decorated Gothic style and possesses the longest continuous medieval stone vault in the world, among other features of historical significance. The adjoining Bishop's Palace and its gatehouse, built in the 13th century, are separately Grade I listed; its west wing contains the Cathedral's library and archives. There are six Grade I listed churches in Exeter: St David's, St Mary Steps, St Thomas', St Martin's, St Mary Arches and St Michael and All Angels, as well as the Presbyterian George's Chapel. Completed in 1763, Exeter Synagogue is Britain's third oldest active synagogue.

Exeter's 2.35 km-long city walls are of Roman origin but were repaired and rebuilt during the Anglo Saxon, medieval, and Civil War periods, and incorporate turrets and bastions from the first three periods. Rougemont Castle was built into the northern corner of these walls in 1068; while the Norman gatehouse survives, the original buildings of the inner bailey were replaced by a Palladian-style courthouse in 1774. The Old Exe Bridge, completed around 1200, is one of the best-preserved examples of a major medieval stone bridge of its date in England. Exeter's Guildhall dates from 1468 to 1470, although there has been a building on the present site since the 14th century. Tuckers Hall and The House That Moved are two surviving examples of 15th-century architecture. The Cathedral Close contains several historic buildings, among them St Petrock's Church and the timber-framed Mol's Coffee House; it also contains a World War I memorial by Edwin Lutyens, the Devon County War Memorial.

Northernhay Gardens, beside Rougemont Castle, were laid out in 1612 as a pleasure walk for Exeter residents. The gardens contain part of the city walls and the Exeter War Memorial, a First World War memorial. In the quay area of the city, the 17th-century Custom House represents the earliest purpose-built example of its kind in England. Nearby buildings originally used as a fish market and as warehouses date from the 19th century. The area of Southernhay contains many examples of Georgian architecture, including the original site of the Royal Devon and Exeter Hospital. Outside the city centre, Topsham contains several examples of 17th- and 18th-century properties, including houses related to its mercantile history.

== Media ==
Exeter has a weekly newspaper, Express and Echo, and is covered by the Plymouth-printed daily regional paper The Western Morning News. The university's student newspaper Exeposé is printed fortnightly.

Local radio stations include BBC Radio Devon (which joins the South West Regional service in the evenings), Heart West, DevonAir, the commercial radio station Radio Exe, and the community radio station Phonic FM. Additionally, the University has a well established student station, Xpression FM.

Both BBC Spotlight and ITV West Country provide Exeter with regional TV news outputs. BBC Spotlight is broadcast from Plymouth and ITV West Country is broadcast from Bristol, although both services do have newsrooms in Exeter. The St Thomas and Stockland Hill transmitting station both provide the city's coverage. Exeter was a filming location for the television drama series The Onedin Line (1971–80), Skins (2007–13), and Broadchurch (2013–17).

Exeter is home to a number of independent publishing and printing companies. In 1934, Allen Lane was inspired by his experience at Exeter St Davids to develop paperback books that could be sold affordably at railway stations; in the following year, he would establish the publisher Penguin Books.

== Twin towns ==
Exeter is twinned with:

- Rennes, France (since the early 1950s)
- Bad Homburg, Germany (since 1965)
- Terracina, Italy (since 1988)

The city was formerly twinned with Yaroslavl, Russia, from 1989 until links were suspended in 2022 due to the Russian invasion of Ukraine.

== Freedom of the City ==
People and military units receiving the Freedom of the City of Exeter include

=== Individuals ===
- Admiral Horatio Nelson, 1st Viscount Nelson: 15 January 1801.
- John Hannam: 1998.
- Rob Baxter: 25 July 2017.
- Gareth Steenson: 7 October 2021.
- Steve Smith: 2019.

=== Military units ===
- The Royal Marines: April 1977.
- 243 (The Wessex) Field Hospital (V): July 2002.
- The Rifles (formerly The Devonshire and Dorset Regiment): June 2007.
- The Coldstream Guards: July 2011.
- RAF Brize Norton: 21 October 2013.
- HMS Defender, RN: March 2014.

== Notable people ==
See List of people from Exeter and Category:People from Exeter

== See also ==
- Exeter (HM Prison)
- Henry Phillpotts

== Sources and further reading ==
- Gray, Todd (2000). Exeter: The Traveller's Tales. Exeter: The Mint Press. ISBN 1-903356-00-8.
- Higham, Robert (2008). Making Anglo-Saxon Devon. Exeter: The Mint Press. ISBN 978-1-903356-57-9.
- Hoskins, W. G. (2004). Two Thousand Years in Exeter (Revised and updated ed.). Chichester: Phillimore. p. 23. ISBN 1-86077-303-6.
- Neville, Julia (2010). Exeter and the Trams 1882–1931. Exeter Civic Society. ISBN 978-0-9544343-1-1.
- Sellman, R.R. (1985). Aspects of Devon History (New ed.). Exeter: Devon Books. ISBN 0-86114-756-1.
- Sharp, Thomas (1946). Exeter Phoenix: A Plan for Rebuilding. London: The Architectural Press.
- Stoyle, Mark (2003). Circled With Stone: Exeter's City Walls, 1485–1660. Exeter: University of Exeter Press. ISBN 978-0-85989-727-3.
- Stoyle, Mark (1996). From Deliverance to Destruction: Rebellion and Civil War in an English City. Exeter: University of Exeter Press. ISBN 978-0-85989-478-4.
- Stoyle, Mark (2014). Water in the City: The Aqueducts and Underground Passages of Exeter. Exeter: University of Exeter Press. ISBN 978-0-85989-877-5.
