= Mol's Coffee House =

Building in Exeter, Devon, England

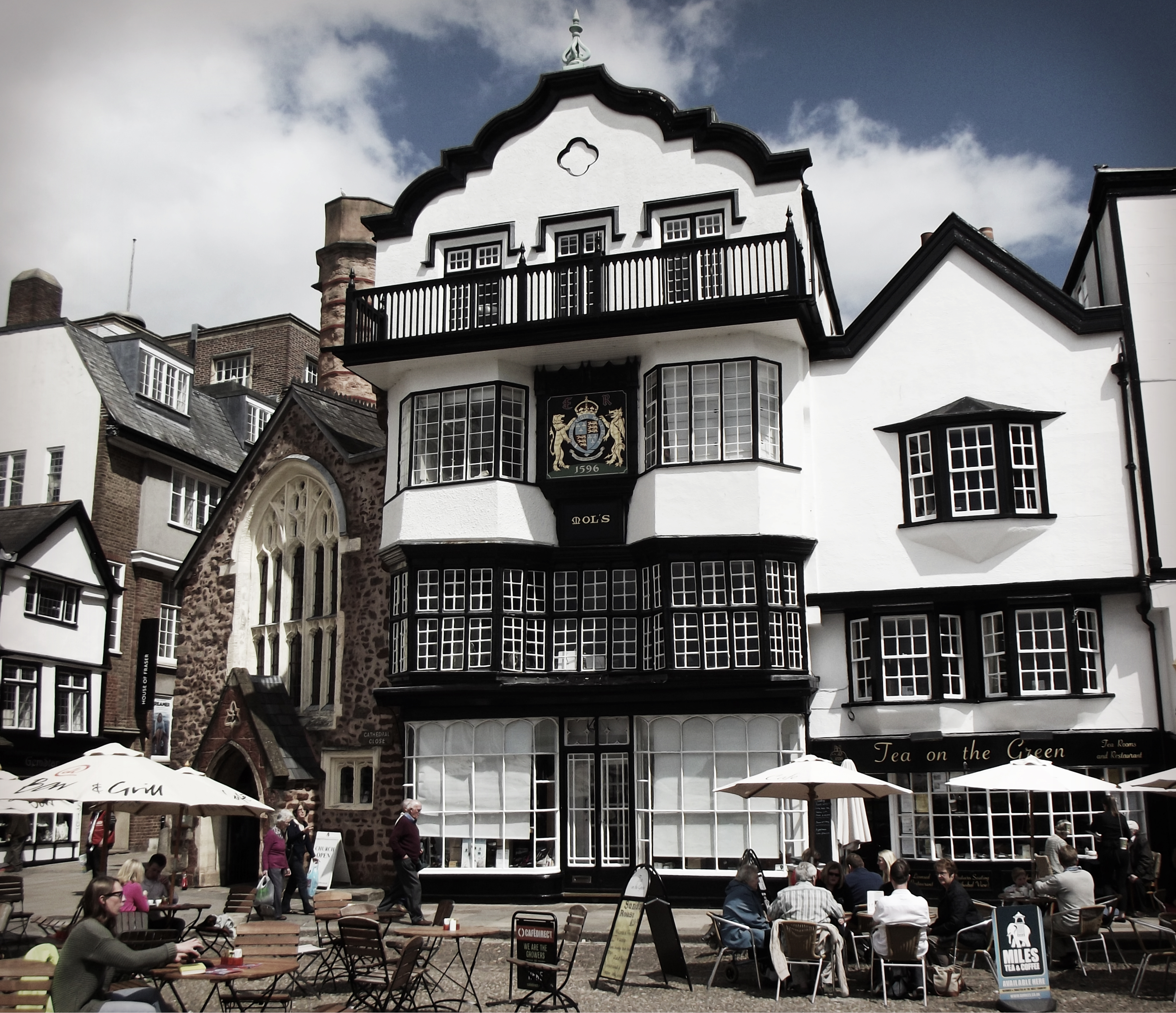
- Mol's Coffee House in 2013
- Interactive map of the Mol's Coffee House area

General information
- Location: 1 Cathedral Close, Exeter, Devon, England
- Coordinates: 50°43′24.24″N 3°31′48″W
- Year built: 16th century

Mol's Coffee House is a historic building and coffeehouse in Exeter, Devon. It is a Grade I Listed building. The house is in the northern corner of Cathedral Close, adjoining Cathedral Yard and overlooking Cathedral Green and the North tower of the Cathedral. It is alongside St Martin's Church.

== History ==
The building was used as a custom house from the late 16th century.

In 1726, the building opened as a coffee house called Mol's. It was run exclusively by women until it was closed in 1829, the first of these being Mary Wildy.

In 1833, the building became an art gallery occupied by John Gendall.

Mol's Coffee House was saved from being damaged by the fire that severely damaged the nearby Royal Clarence Hotel in 2016.

== Architecture ==
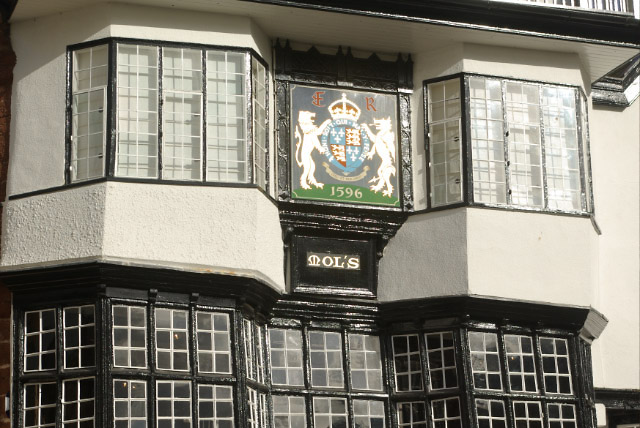
The bay windows and date panel

The building is of four floors with a timber-framed front.

A central panel painted with the Royal Arms was installed circa 1885, replacing a carved version.

The third storey features a distinctive curly Dutch gable of 19th century construction.

The first floor interior geatures late 16th century oak panelling and carvings.

== See also ==
- Grade I listed buildings in Exeter
