= Bishop's Palace, Exeter =

Building in Exeter, Devon, England

Bishop's Palace
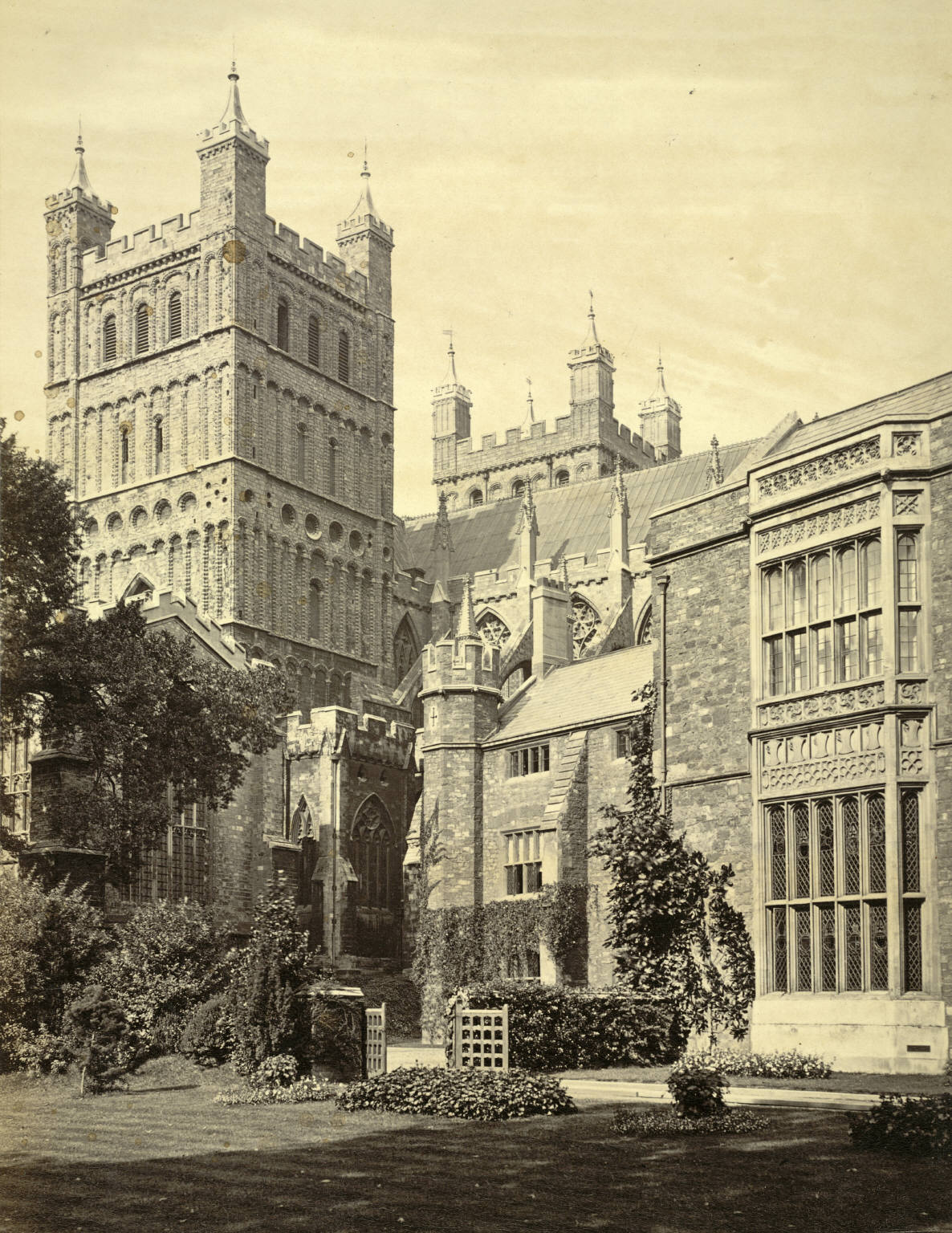
- Bishop's Palace, Exeter, circa 1865
- Interactive map of the Bishop's Palace area

General information
- Architectural style: Gothic
- Location: Exeter, Devon, England
- Coordinates: 50°43′19.560″N 3°31′45.408″W5
- Years built: Mostly 13th & 19th centuries
- Owner: The Dean and Chapter

Technical details
- Material: Heavitree stone

The Bishop's Palace is the residence of the Bishop of Exeter in Exeter, Devon. It is a Grade I Listed building.

== History ==
The Bishop's Palace was originally built under William Briwere, an early 13th century Bishop of Exeter.

The palace originally incorporated a great hall, though this was later demolished.

In 1916, the palace was requisitioned by the government and served as a military hospital during the First World War.

The palace returned to use as the Bishop of Exeter's residence in 1948.

The garden is thought to be the oldest in Devon. The grounds contain a first generation Lucombe oak.

== Architecture ==
The palace was originally built in the 13th century of Heavitree stone. The building underwent extensive work by Ewan Christian in 1846-8.

The chapel was built in the 13th century and later restored by William Butterfield.

The palace's south porch holds an inner doorway built circa 1200 composed of a monumental Gothic arch.

An early 16th century oriel window was taken from the house of Thomas Elyot by St Petrock's Church, Exeter, when it was demolished with the Broadgate around 1840.

=== The Gatehouse ===
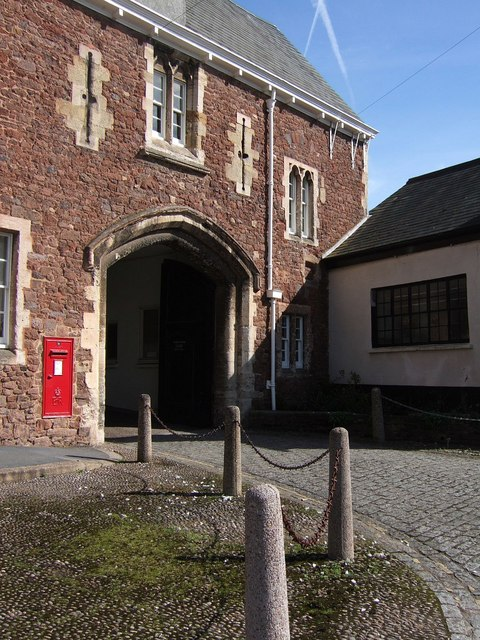
The gatehouse to the Bishop's Palace

The gatehouse to the Bishop's Palace is separately Grade I Listed.

Like the palace itself, the gatehouse was built of red Heavitree stone, though probably slightly later in the 14th century. However, some of the timbers date from the 13th century and possibly the late 12th century.

The gatehouse was altered in the 18th century with a Georgian staircase and sash windows. Stone windows and a half-timbered top storey were added by William Butterfield. A modern slate roof has since been added.

The medieval palace wall, also built of Heavitree stone, is separately Grade II Listed.

== Exeter Cathedral Library & Archives ==
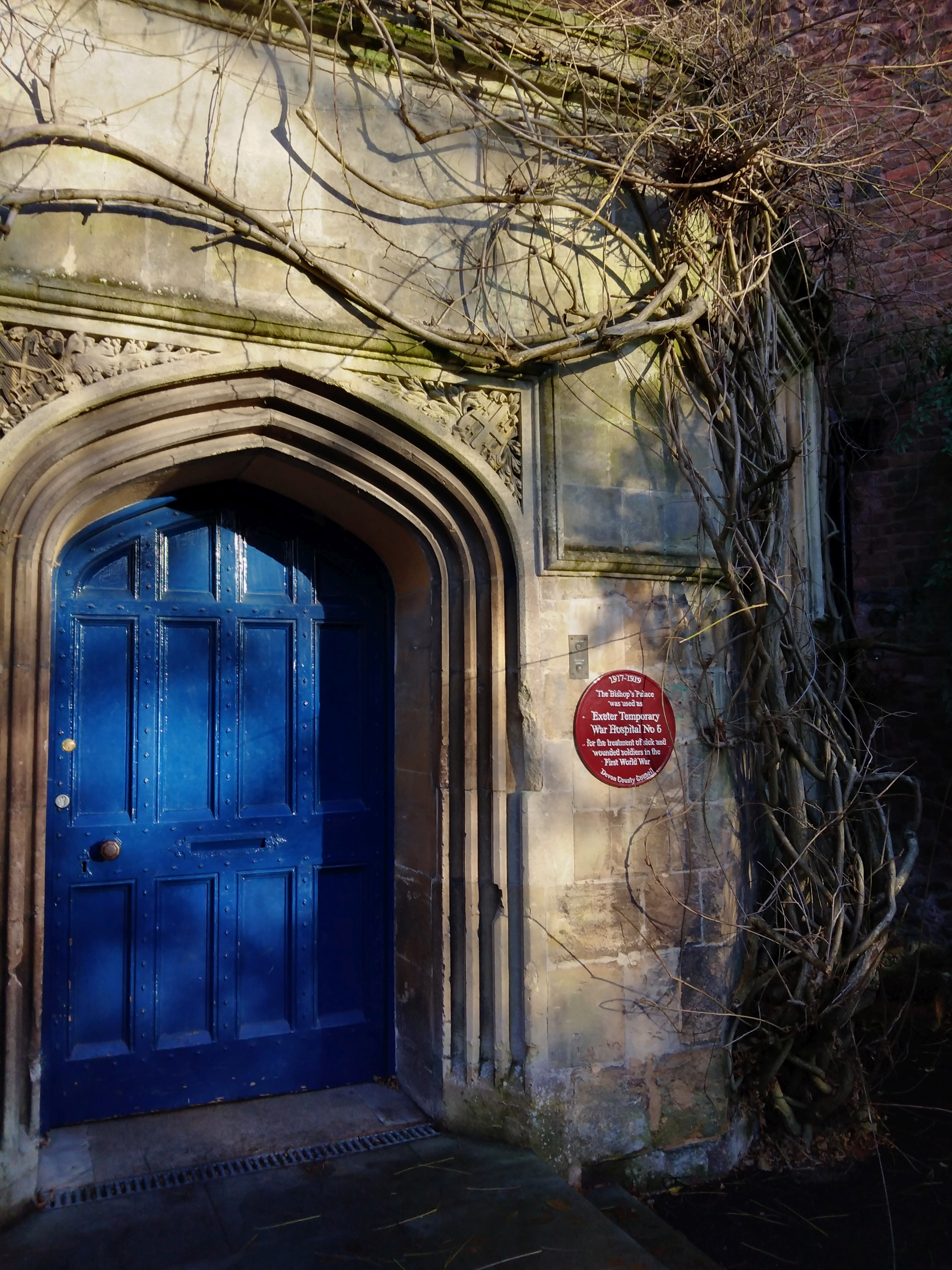
The entrance to the Exeter Cathedral Library & Archives in the west wing of the Bishop's Palace

The west wing of the Bishop's Palace houses the extensive library and archives of Exeter Cathedral.

The collections span the 10th to 21st centuries and include the Exeter Book.

The archive is open to researchers on appointment.

== See also ==
- Grade I listed buildings in Exeter
- Exeter Cathedral
- Bishop's Court, Devon
