= Cathedral Close, Exeter =

Street in Exeter, Devon, England

Cathedral Close
- Interactive map of Cathedral Close
- Location: Exeter, Devon, England
- Coordinates: 50.7227°N 3.5288°W

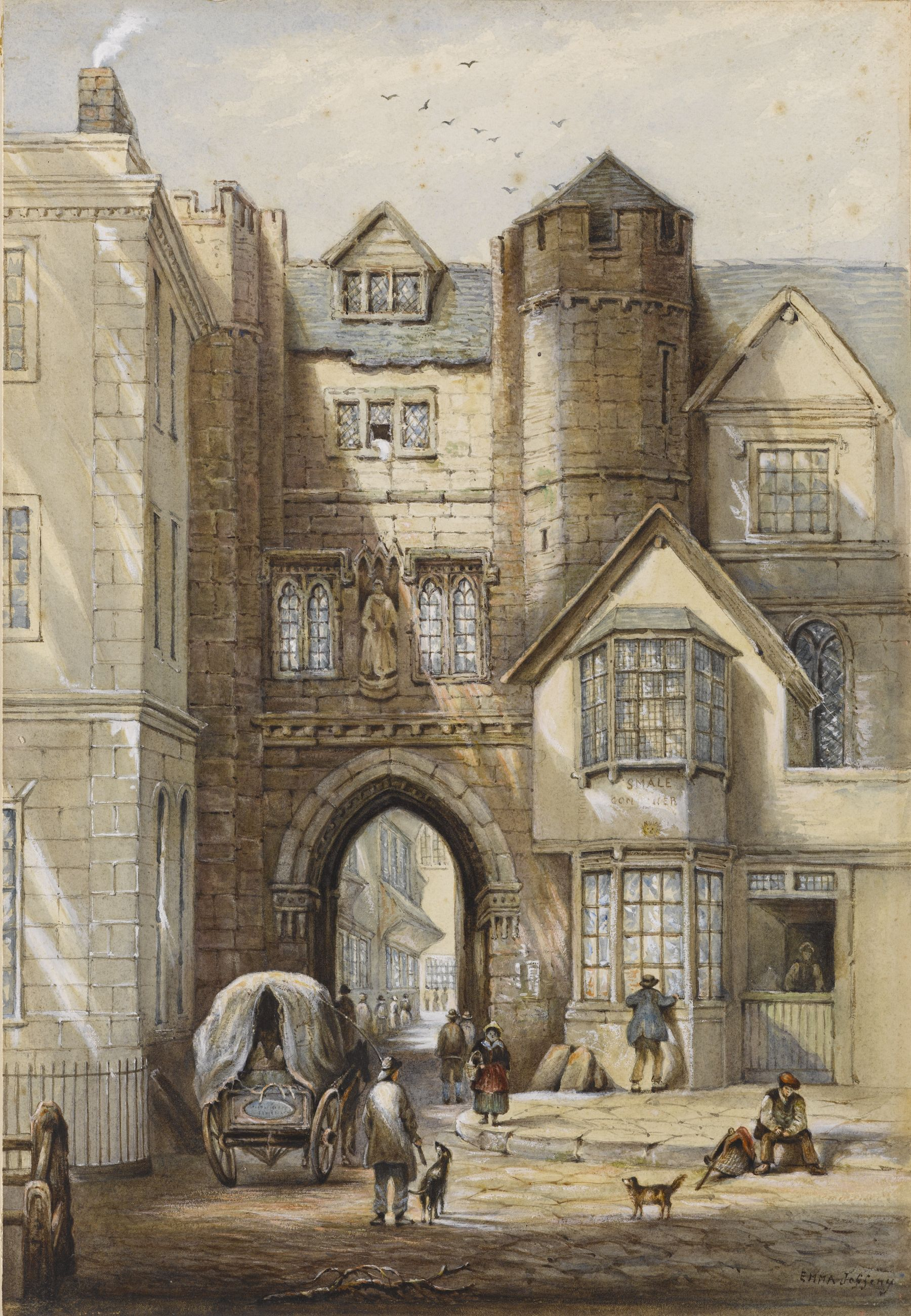
'Broadgate seen from the Cathedral Close, Exeter'. Pen, ink, and watercolour on paper attributed by Emma Jeffery

The area of Cathedral Close, Exeter has been in the centre of Exeter, Devon, England, since Roman times when there was a basilica and a bath house in this area. A church was established here by the seventh century when a young Saint Boniface came from Crediton to study. The area was walled after 1283 and seven gates into the yard were created. The gates included one at St Petrocks and the original grand entrance into the yard – Broadgate. This created the cathedral close.

The postal address Cathedral Close refers only to the properties adjoining the north-eastern side of the grassed area around the cathedral. The north-western side of the Cathedral Green, including the Royal Clarence Hotel, is known as Cathedral Yard.

In the centre of the green is a statue of Richard Hooker, a 16th-century Anglican theologian, who was born in Exeter.

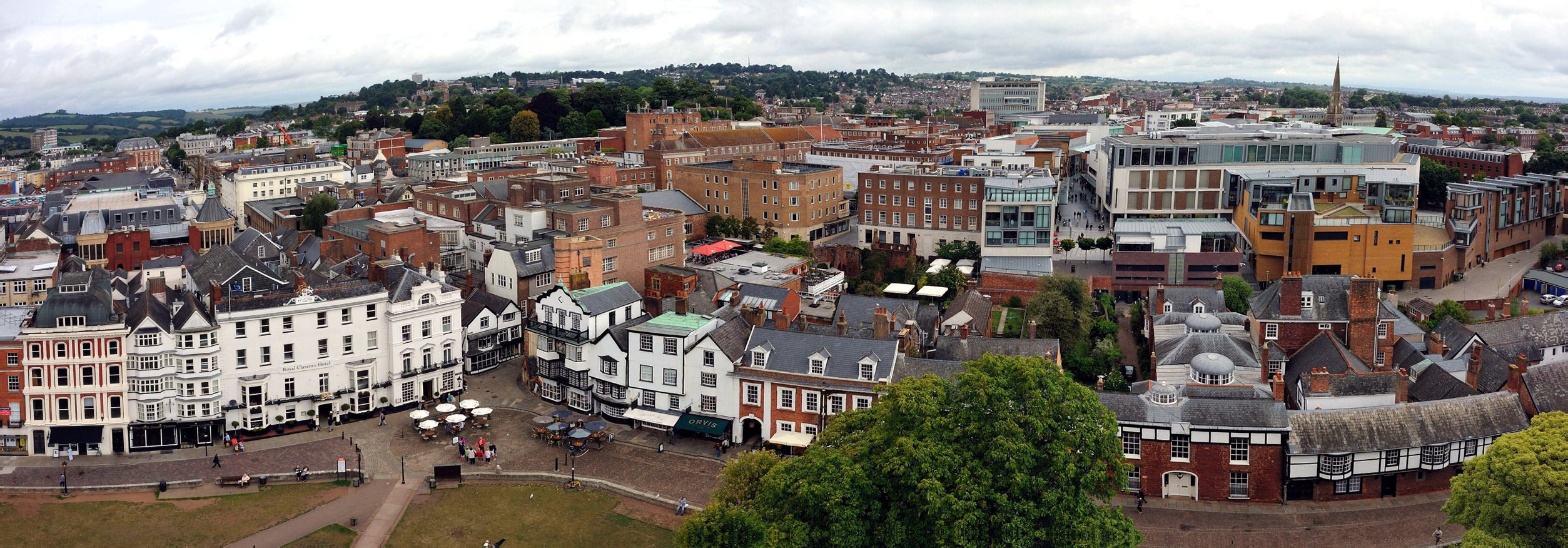
A panorama of part of the close looking northwards from the roof of the north tower of the cathedral

== Buildings in the close ==
As well as the Cathedral itself there are a number of important buildings in the close. Two churches face the Cathedral – St Petrocks Church and St Martins. There are also a number of other Grade I listed buildings: Mol's Coffee House, No 5, Nos 8, 9 and 9a and No 10 Cathedral Close. The grade II listed Royal Clarence Hotel (currently under a two–year restoration scheduled for completion in 2027), in Cathedral Yard, also overlooks the Green.
