= George's Chapel, Exeter =

Church in Devon, England

Coordinates: 50.7206°N 3.5300°W

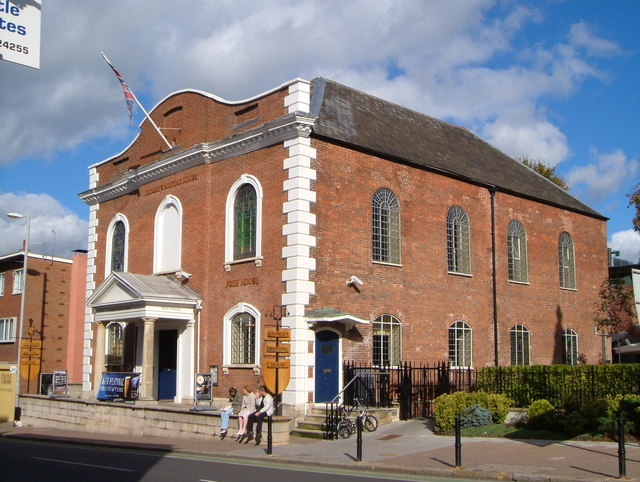
George's Meeting House

George's Chapel or George's Meeting House was built in 1760 (the year of the coronation of George III) as a Presbyterian chapel. It was sold in 1987 and first became an antiques centre before being sold to JD Wetherspoon, who re-opened it as a pub in 2005, preserving many of the original features. It is a grade I listed building.
