= St Martin's Church, Exeter =

Church in Devon, England

St Martin's Church
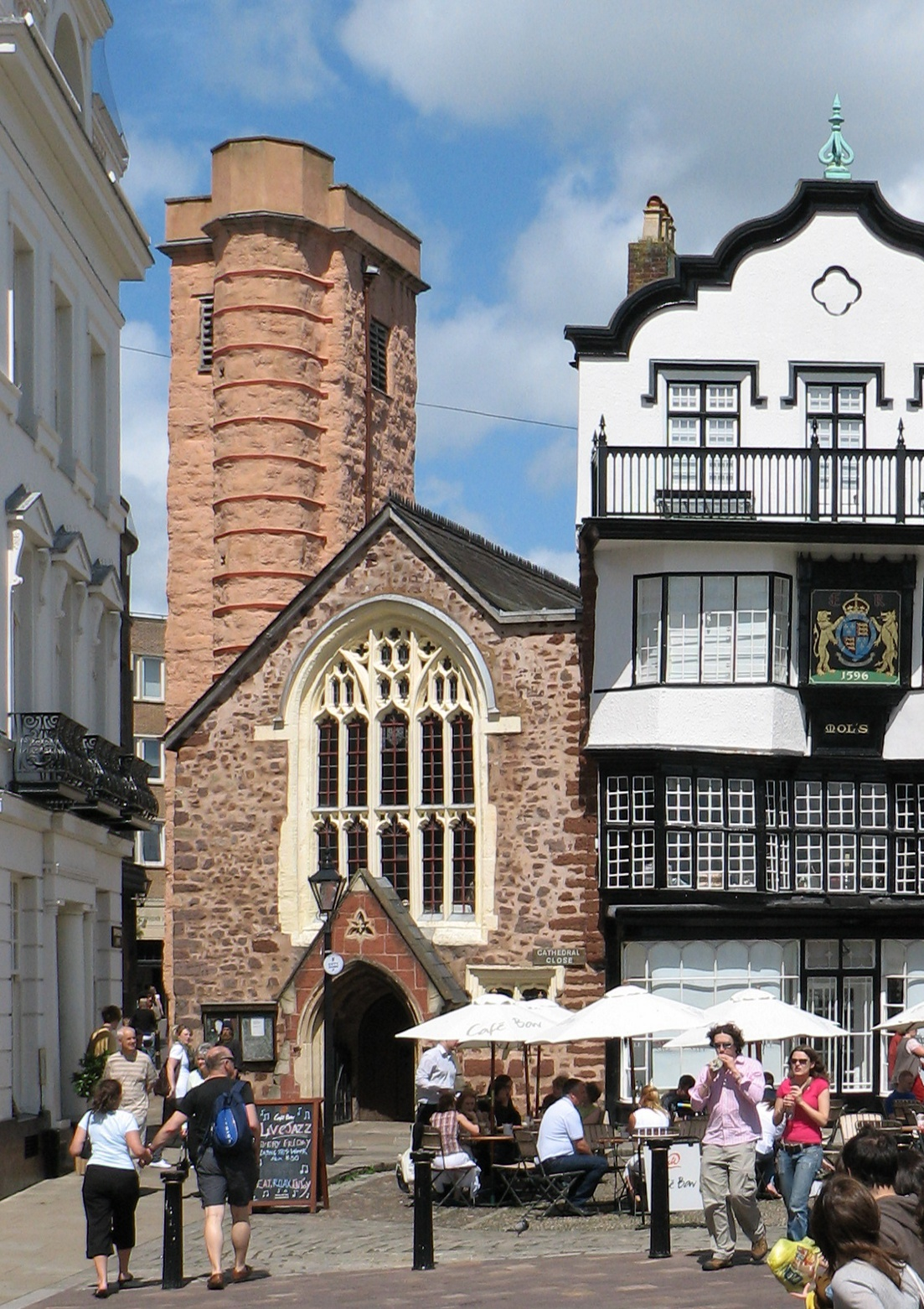

- Location within Devon
- 50°43′23″N 3°31′52″W
- Location: Cathedral Close, Exeter, Devon, England

History
- Built: 15th century

Listed Building – Grade I
- Official name: Church of St Martin
- Designated: 29 January 1953
- Reference no.: 1169625

St Martin's Church in Cathedral Close, Exeter, Devon, England was built in the 15th century. It is recorded in the National Heritage List for England as a designated Grade I listed building, and is now a redundant church in the care of the Churches Conservation Trust. It was vested in the Trust on 1 August 1995.

It is built of Heavitree stone and has slate roofs. The chancel arch is thought to be the oldest part of the building, and may date from the previous church on the site which was consecrated on 6 July 1065 by Bishop Leofric. There are traces of Anglo-Saxon long-and-short work high in the south-east corner of the nave. The tower was added in 1675.

The interior contains 17th and 18th century monuments, reredos and altar rails, some of which were brought from the nearby St Paul's, which was demolished in 1936. The south window contains a few fragments of medieval glass. At the west end is a panelled gallery with the painted arms of Bishop Trelawny (1688–1707) and the City of Exeter, both flanking the royal coat of arms.

== See also ==
- List of churches preserved by the Churches Conservation Trust in South West England
