= Grade II* listed buildings in Exeter =

Exeter shown in Devon

There are over 20,000 Grade II* listed buildings in England. This page is a list of these buildings in the district of Exeter in Devon.

== Buildings ==
Name	Location	Type	Completed (Note: The date given is the date used by Historic England as significant for the initial building or that of an important part in the structure's description.)	Date designated	Grid ref. (Note: The grid reference is based on the British national grid reference system, sometimes known as OSGB36, used by the Ordnance Survey.) Geo-coordinates	Entry number (Note: The "List Entry Number" is a unique number assigned to each listed building and scheduled monument by Historic England.)	Image
Bellair	Exeter	House	c. 1700	29 January 1953	SX9295691709; 50°42′54″N 3°31′03″W	1224137	Bellair More images
Boundary Wall, Piers and Gates of Broadway House	Topsham, Exeter	Gate	1776	11 November 1952	SX9648188309; 50°41′07″N 3°28′00″W	1333434	Upload Photo
Broadway House	Topsham, Exeter	House	1776	11 November 1952	SX9649088316; 50°41′07″N 3°28′00″W	1103877	Broadway House More images
Chapel at St Anne's Almshouses	Exeter	Chapel	15th century	29 January 1953	SX9280393293; 50°43′46″N 3°31′13″W	1380202	Chapel at St Anne's Almshouses More images
Chichester Place	Exeter	Terrace	1824–25	29 January 1953	SX9238792676; 50°43′25″N 3°31′33″W	1223851	Chichester Place More images
Church House	Exeter	House	17th century	29 January 1953	SX9206892501; 50°43′19″N 3°31′49″W	1225195	Church House More images
Church of Saint Michael and All Angels	Heavitree, Exeter	Church	Medieval origins, rebuilt 1844–46	29 January 1953	SX9375792266; 50°43′13″N 3°30′23″W	1333344	Church of Saint Michael and All Angels More images
Church of St Andrew	Exwick, Exeter	Chapel of ease	1841–42	18 June 1974	SX9085093620; 50°43′55″N 3°32′53″W	1223954	Church of St Andrew More images
Church of St Michael	Alphington, Exeter	Church	Late 15th century	30 June 1961	SX9183689982; 50°41′58″N 3°31′59″W	1103980	Church of St Michael More images
Church of St Michael and All Angels	Pinhoe, Exeter	Church	Late 14th to early 15th century	30 June 1961	SX9552094973; 50°44′42″N 3°28′56″W	1104037	Church of St Michael and All Angels More images
Church of St Olave	Exeter	Church	14th century	29 January 1953	SX9181892466; 50°43′18″N 3°32′02″W	1103969	Church of St Olave More images
Church of St Pancras	Exeter	Church	13th century	29 January 1953	SX9192292693; 50°43′26″N 3°31′57″W	1222964	Church of St Pancras More images
Church of St Petrock	Exeter	Church	Early 15th century	29 January 1953	SX9194692576; 50°43′22″N 3°31′56″W	1333409	Church of St Petrock More images
Church of St Stephen	Exeter	Church	1664	29 January 1953	SX9211392722; 50°43′27″N 3°31′47″W	1170488	Church of St Stephen More images
Civic Hall and Higher Market	Exeter	Hall	1838	18 June 1974	SX9193992750; 50°43′27″N 3°31′56″W	1223245	Civic Hall and Higher Market More images
Clara Place	Topsham, Exeter	House	1841	11 November 1952	SX9641888280; 50°41′06″N 3°28′03″W	1103963	Clara Place More images
Railings, Steps and Cast Iron Piers at Clara Place	Topsham, Exeter	Railings	1841	11 November 1952	SX9643288266; 50°41′05″N 3°28′03″W	1170221	Upload Photo
Cleve House	Exeter	House	Late 17th century	29 January 1953	SX9017393217; 50°43′41″N 3°33′27″W	1306243	Upload Photo
Colleton Villa	Exeter	Villa	c. 1830	18 June 1974	SX9208592130; 50°43′07″N 3°31′48″W	1333380	Colleton Villa More images
Cowick Barton	Exeter	House	1540	29 January 1953	SX9089691112; 50°42′34″N 3°32′48″W	1104011	Cowick Barton More images
Cromer House	Topsham, Exeter	House	1720	11 November 1952	SX9657487965; 50°40′56″N 3°27′55″W	1306102	Cromer House More images
Devon and Exeter Institution	Exeter	Town house	16th century or earlier	29 January 1953	SX9215592614; 50°43′23″N 3°31′45″W	1104062	Devon and Exeter Institution More images
Devon County Hall	St Leonards, Exeter	County hall	1964	24 April 1998	SX9295891644; 50°42′52″N 3°31′03″W	1323701	Devon County Hall More images
Devon County War Memorial and Processional Way	Exeter	War memorial	1921 (Memorial), 1974 (Way)	16 April 2009	SX9199192567; 50°43′22″N 3°31′53″W	1393228	Devon County War Memorial and Processional Way More images
Exeter City War Memorial	Exeter	War memorial	1923	8 September 2014	SZ0843191322; 50°43′35″N 3°31′54″W	1420669	Exeter City War Memorial More images
Exeter Country Club (Weare House)	Exeter	Country house	Probably c. 1804	29 January 1953	SX9502689910; 50°41′58″N 3°29′16″W	1224192	Upload Photo
Fish Market	Exeter Quay	Fish market	c. 1838	18 June 1974	SX9201792095; 50°43′06″N 3°31′52″W	1223047	Fish Market More images
Harbourmaster's Office	Exeter	Harbour Master's office	18th century	29 January 1953	SX9200692144; 50°43′08″N 3°31′52″W	1223041	Harbourmaster's Office More images
Imperial Hotel	Exeter	House	c. 1810	29 January 1953	SX9142693429; 50°43′49″N 3°32′23″W	1222697	Imperial Hotel More images
Iron Footbridge	Exeter	Footbridge	1814	29 January 1953	SX9226092534; 50°43′21″N 3°31′40″W	1333351	Iron Footbridge More images
Notaries' House	Exeter	House	Early 18th century	29 January 1953	SX9217292599; 50°43′23″N 3°31′44″W	1306408	Notaries' House More images
Old Matford	Wonford Rd, Exeter	House	c. 1600	29 January 1953	SX9329291836; 50°42′59″N 3°30′46″W	1224370	Old Matford More images
Old Tudor House (Tiddy House)	Exeter	House	Late 16th century	29 January 1953	SX9159292287; 50°43′12″N 3°32′13″W	1266938	Old Tudor House (Tiddy House) More images
Pinbrook House	Exeter	Manor house	1679	11 November 1952	SX9523794560; 50°44′28″N 3°29′10″W	1104086	Pinbrook House More images
Polsloe Priory	Exeter	Priory	13th century	29 January 1953	SX9411493814; 50°44′03″N 3°30′06″W	1169490	Polsloe Priory More images
Rougemont House	Exeter	House	Early 19th century	29 January 1953	SX9212192895; 50°43′32″N 3°31′47″W	1169610	Rougemont House More images
Royal Devon and Exeter Hospital	Exeter	Hospital	By 1758	18 June 1974	SX9227092376; 50°43′16″N 3°31′39″W	1267091	Royal Devon and Exeter Hospital More images
Salutation Hotel	Topsham, Exeter	Hotel	Probably c. 1720	11 November 1952	SX9655088114; 50°41′00″N 3°27′57″W	1103914	Salutation Hotel More images
Shell House	Topsham, Exeter	House	Late 17th century	11 November 1952	SX9670387724; 50°40′48″N 3°27′48″W	1267061	Shell House More images
Sidwell Street Methodist Church	Exeter	Methodist chapel		31 October 1983	SX9260593155; 50°43′41″N 3°31′23″W	1224385	Sidwell Street Methodist Church More images
Southernhay House	Exeter	House	Early 19th century	29 January 1953	SX9234392490; 50°43′19″N 3°31′35″W	1223853	Southernhay House More images
St Margaret's Church	Topsham, Exeter	Church	15th century tower	30 June 1961	SX9653788029; 50°40′58″N 3°27′57″W	1170373	St Margaret's Church More images
St Olave's Home	Exeter	House	Probably 18th century	29 January 1953	SX9168492538; 50°43′20″N 3°32′09″W	1104074	Upload Photo
Synagogue	Synagogue Place, Exeter	Synagogue	1764	29 January 1953	SX9181692558; 50°43′21″N 3°32′02″W	1273591	Synagogue More images
The Castle (Crown Court)	Exeter	Court	1774	29 January 1953	SX9208393002; 50°43′36″N 3°31′49″W	1169617	The Castle (Crown Court) More images
1, The Cloisters	Exeter	House	1762	29 January 1953	SX9205892518; 50°43′20″N 3°31′50″W	1104025	1, The Cloisters More images
2, The Cloisters	Exeter	House	1762	29 January 1953	SX9205692509; 50°43′20″N 3°31′50″W	1333353	2, The Cloisters More images
The Deanery	Exeter	Deanery	Probably 15th century	29 January 1953	SX9201592511; 50°43′20″N 3°31′52″W	1104026	The Deanery More images
Tuckers Hall	Exeter	Hall	15th century	29 January 1953	SX9172592357; 50°43′15″N 3°32′07″W	1103965	Tuckers Hall More images
Warehouse Vaults (1–4, The Quay)	Exeter	Warehouse	1825	29 January 1953	SX9217491981; 50°43′03″N 3°31′43″W	1223045	Warehouse Vaults (1–4, The Quay) More images
Warehouse Vaults (6–11, The Quay)	Exeter	Warehouse		29 January 1953	SX9207092094; 50°43′06″N 3°31′49″W	1223046	Warehouse Vaults (6–11, The Quay) More images
Wynard's Hospital	Exeter	Almshouse	17th century	29 January 1953	SX9234892327; 50°43′14″N 3°31′35″W	1239565	Wynard's Hospital More images
2, Cathedral Close	Exeter	Timber-framed house	17th century or earlier	29 January 1953	SX9210892645; 50°43′24″N 3°31′48″W	1333329	2, Cathedral Close More images
3, Cathedral Close	Exeter	Timber-framed house	17th century or earlier	29 January 1953	SX9211292642; 50°43′24″N 3°31′47″W	1169629	3, Cathedral Close
4, Cathedral Close	Exeter	Timber-framed house	17th century or earlier	29 January 1953	SX9211692639; 50°43′24″N 3°31′47″W	1104061	4, Cathedral Close
6, Cathedral Close	Exeter	House	18th century or earlier	29 January 1953	SX9213792625; 50°43′24″N 3°31′46″W	1333330	6, Cathedral Close More images
15 and 15a, Cathedral Close	Exeter	House	c. 1740	29 January 1953	SX9219192555; 50°43′21″N 3°31′43″W	1104021	15 and 15a, Cathedral Close More images
40, High Street	Exeter	House	Late 17th century	29 January 1953	SX9205292673; 50°43′25″N 3°31′50″W	1103897	Upload Photo
41 and 42 High Street	Exeter	Timber-framed house	1564	29 January 1953	SX9204792667; 50°43′25″N 3°31′51″W	1170491	41 and 42 High Street More images
46, High Street	Exeter	Timber-framed house	16th century or earlier	29 January 1953	SX9203392655; 50°43′24″N 3°31′51″W	1103899	Upload Photo
225 and 226, High Street	Exeter	House	Reputedly built 1567	29 January 1953	SX9203992722; 50°43′27″N 3°31′51″W	1170556	225 and 226, High Street More images
227, High Street	Exeter	House	Mid 17th century	29 January 1953	SX9205092729; 50°43′27″N 3°31′51″W	1103907	227, High Street More images
26, The Strand	Topsham, Exeter	Merchant's house	Late 17th century	11 November 1952	SX9675587641; 50°40′45″N 3°27′46″W	1224027	26, The Strand More images
Wall and Gates of No 26, The Strand	Topsham, Exeter	Gate	18th century	11 November 1952	SX9674387632; 50°40′45″N 3°27′46″W	1267065	Wall and Gates of No 26, The Strand
27, The Strand	Topsham, Exeter	Merchant's house	Late 17th century	11 November 1952	SX9675487627; 50°40′45″N 3°27′46″W	1224066	27, The Strand More images
Wall and Gates of No 27, The Strand	Topsham, Exeter	Gate		18 June 1974	SX9674987619; 50°40′45″N 3°27′46″W	1266994	Wall and Gates of No 27, The Strand
28, The Strand	Topsham, Exeter	Counting house	Late 17th century	11 November 1952	SX9675787617; 50°40′44″N 3°27′45″W	1224068	28, The Strand
34, The Strand	Topsham, Exeter	Merchant's house	Late 17th century	11 November 1952	SX9677487581; 50°40′43″N 3°27′45″W	1224070	34, The Strand
No 40, The Strand (the Dutch House) including the Garage and the Dutch House	Topsham, Exeter	Merchant's house	Late 17th century	11 November 1952	SX9680087505; 50°40′41″N 3°27′43″W	1224078	Upload Photo
Wall and Piers of No 40, The Strand	Topsham, Exeter	Wall	18th century	18 June 1974	SX9679287498; 50°40′41″N 3°27′44″W	1224110	Upload Photo
1, Upper Paul Street	Exeter	House	Early 18th century	29 January 1953	SX9197792826; 50°43′30″N 3°31′54″W	1224196	Upload Photo
1–5, Pennsylvania Crescent	Exeter	Villa	c. 1820	29 January 1953	SX9241793670; 50°43′58″N 3°31′33″W	1222965	1–5, Pennsylvania Crescent
1–10, Southernhay West	Exeter	Terrace	Early 19th century	29 January 1953	SX9226892484; 50°43′19″N 3°31′39″W	1223945	1–10, Southernhay West More images
13–24, Southernhay West	Exeter	House		29 January 1953	SX9229792574; 50°43′22″N 3°31′38″W	1267058	13–24, Southernhay West More images
1–6, Pennsylvania Park	Exeter	Terrace	1823	29 January 1953	SX9275394316; 50°44′19″N 3°31′16″W	1222966	1–6, Pennsylvania Park More images
12 and 14, Magdalen Road	Exeter	House	1830–40	29 January 1953	SX9268092344; 50°43′15″N 3°31′18″W	1239511	Upload Photo
21, The Mint	Exeter	Priory building	15th century	29 January 1953	SX9174792501; 50°43′19″N 3°32′06″W	1239753	Upload Photo
67, South Street	Exeter	Timber-framed house	Probably early 17th century	29 January 1953	SX9205192346; 50°43′14″N 3°31′50″W	1267088	67, South Street More images
2–6, Barnfield Crescent	Exeter	Terrace	1805	29 January 1953	SX9244592644; 50°43′24″N 3°31′30″W	1306533	2–6, Barnfield Crescent More images
13–15, Dix's Field	Exeter	House	c. 1810	29 January 1953	SX9251492703; 50°43′26″N 3°31′27″W	1333372	13–15, Dix's Field More images
151–155, Magdalen Road	Exeter	House	c. 1810	29 January 1953	SX9336992457; 50°43′19″N 3°30′43″W	1239559	151–155, Magdalen Road More images
1–9, Colleton Crescent	Exeter	Terrace	c. 1805	29 January 1953	SX9217392061; 50°43′05″N 3°31′44″W	1104007	1–9, Colleton Crescent More images
1 and 2, Catherine Street	Exeter	House	Probably 15th century	29 January 1953	SX9208992661; 50°43′25″N 3°31′49″W	1104031	1 and 2, Catherine Street
5 and 7, West Street	Exeter	Timber-framed house	Probably 15th century	29 January 1953	SX9177492259; 50°43′11″N 3°32′04″W	1266893	5 and 7, West Street More images
34–40, Wonford Road	Exeter	House	c. 1840	29 January 1953	SX9270292220; 50°43′11″N 3°31′17″W	1266873	34–40, Wonford Road More images

== See also ==
- Grade I listed buildings in Exeter
