= Devon County War Memorial =

World War I memorial in Exeter, England

- United Kingdom
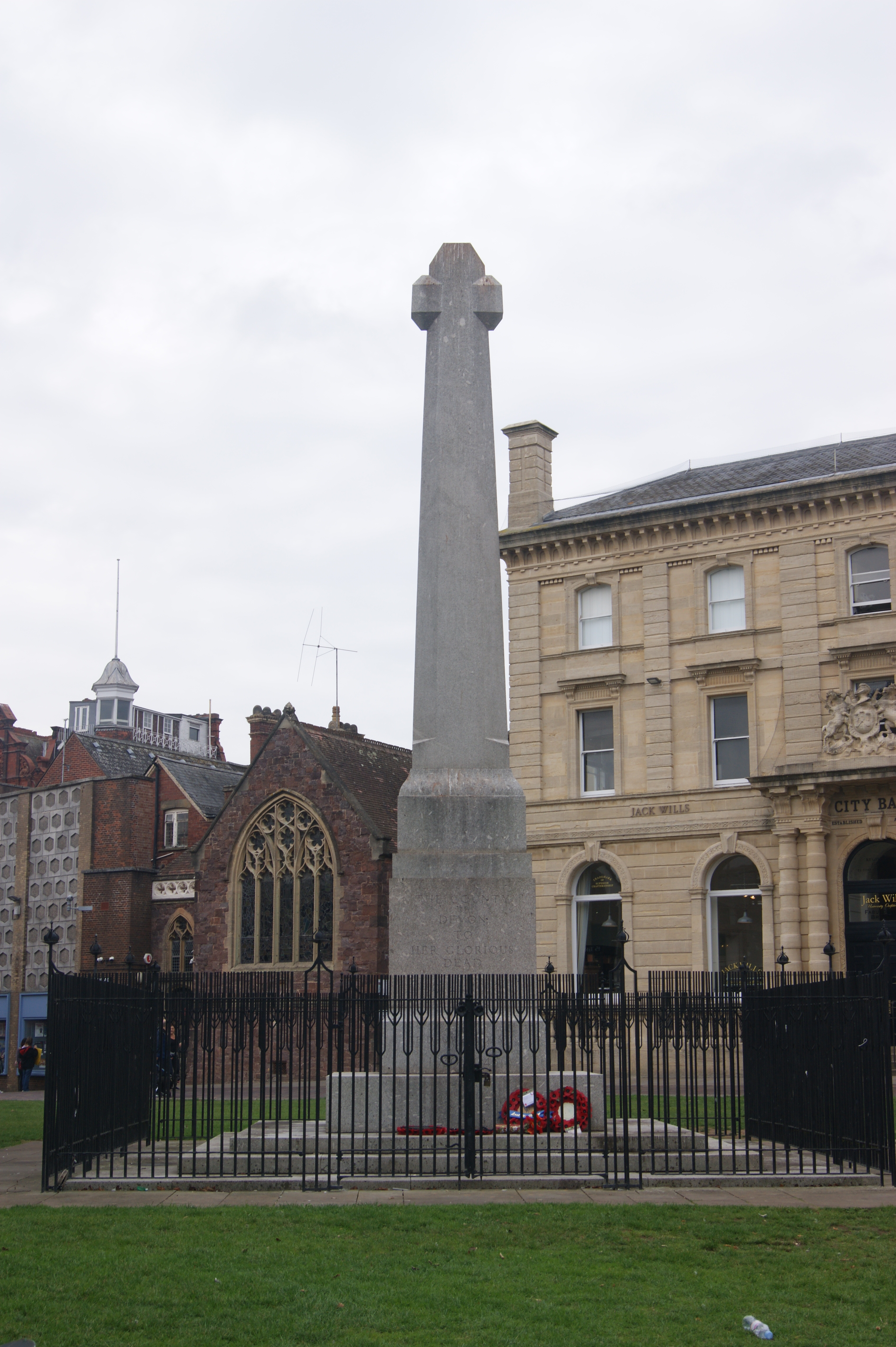
- For approximately 11,600 men and women from Devon killed in the First World War
- Unveiled: 1921
- Location: 50°43′22″N 3°31′54″W; Cathedral Green, Exeter, Devon
- Designed by: Sir Edwin Lutyens
- THE COUNTY OF DEVON TO HER GLORIOUS DEAD / 1914–1919 / TE DEUM LAUDAMUS / 1939–1945

Listed Building – Grade II*
- Official name: Devon County War Memorial and Processional Way
- Designated: 16 April 2009
- Reference no.: 1393228

The Devon County War Memorial is a First World War memorial, designed by Sir Edwin Lutyens and situated on Cathedral Green in Exeter, the county town of Devon, in the south west of England. It is one of fifteen War Crosses designed by Lutyens with similar characteristics, and one of two to serve as a civic memorial in a city. The first proposal for the county's war memorial was to complete the construction of a cloister at Exeter Cathedral to be dedicated to Devon's war dead, but this scheme was abandoned due to lack of funds. After considering multiple proposals, the Devon County War Memorial Committee commissioned Lutyens to design a War Cross instead. The committee chose to site the memorial on the green of Exeter Cathedral after scouting several locations. A war memorial for Exeter itself was being considered concurrently, but the committees for the two projects failed to work together, resulting in two separate memorials—the county memorial by the cathedral and Exeter City War Memorial in Northernhay Gardens.

The memorial takes the form of a simple cross. Hewn from a single block of granite quarried from Haytor on Dartmoor, it stands just to the west of the cathedral, in alignment with the altar. The cross stands on a granite plinth, which itself sits on three steps. It was unveiled by the Prince of Wales on 16 May 1921. After archaeological excavations took place in the 1970s, the area was remodelled to create a processional way between the memorial and the cathedral. The memorial is a grade II* listed building, part of a "national collection" of Lutyens' war memorials. Since 2015, all of Lutyens' memorials in England have been protected by listed building status.

== Background ==
During the aftermath of the First World War, thousands of war memorials were built across Britain. Amongst the most prominent designers of memorials was the architect Sir Edwin Lutyens, described by Historic England as "the leading English architect of his generation". Prior to the First World War, Lutyens established his reputation designing country houses for wealthy patrons, including Castle Drogo to the west of Exeter. Following the war he devoted much of his time to memorialising the casualties. He served as one of the three principal architects to the Imperial War Graves Commission (IWGC) and designed numerous war memorials for towns and villages across Britain, as well as several elsewhere in the Commonwealth. His most famous design was The Cenotaph in London, which became the focus for the national Remembrance Sunday commemorations.

The Devon County memorial is one of fifteen War Crosses designed by Lutyens to a similar specification between 1920 and 1925. Most of Lutyens' War Crosses were commissioned for small villages, but the Devon County memorial is one of two commissioned as a civic memorial in a city—the other being the York City War Memorial.

== Commissioning ==
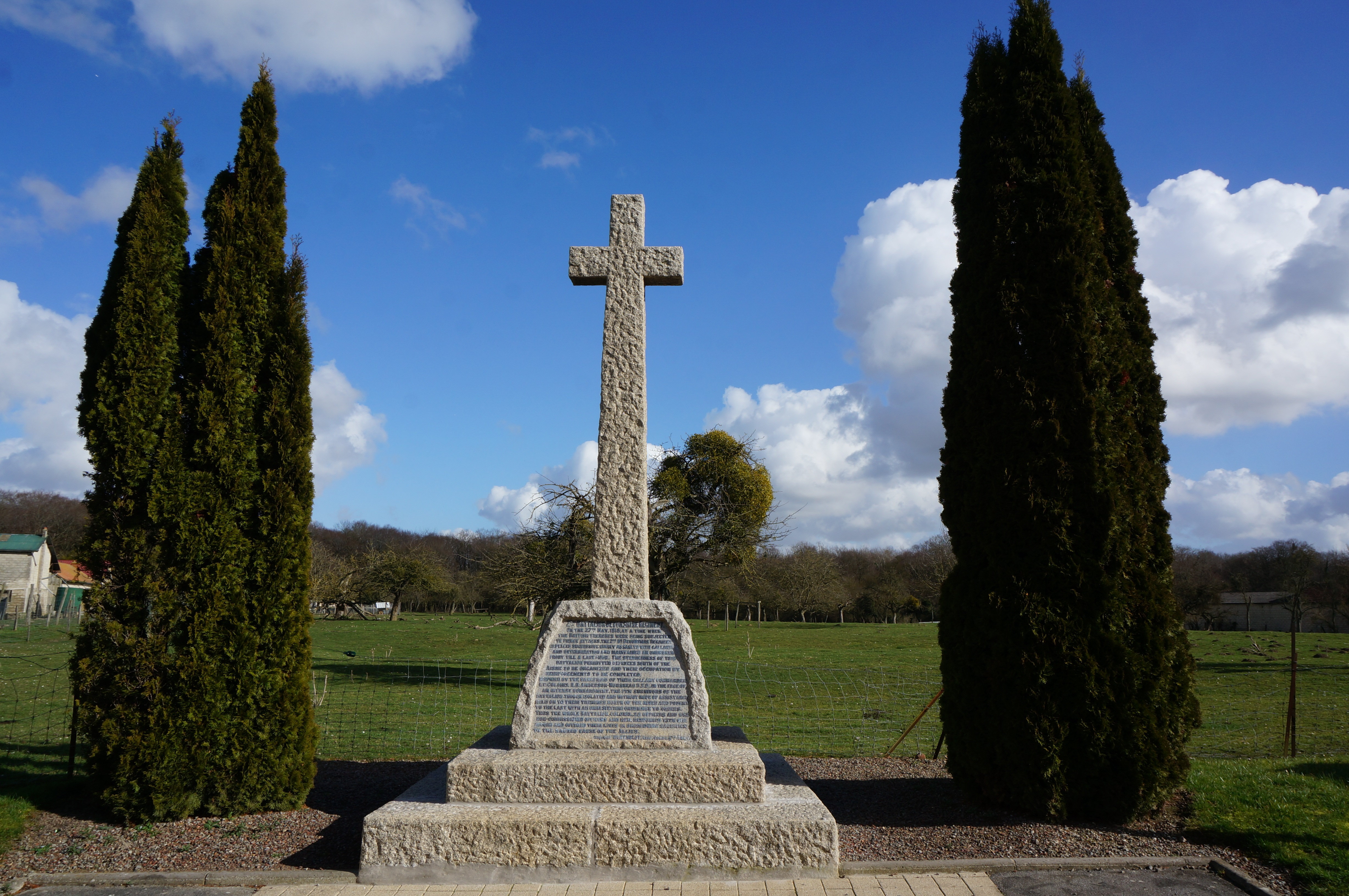
The 2nd Devonshires' memorial at La Ville-aux-Bois-lès-Pontavert, whose construction was supported by the Devon County War Memorial Committee

The first proposal to commemorate Devon's war dead came from the Dean of Exeter in December 1918, a month after the signing of the armistice. The Dean suggested that a cloister could be built at Exeter Cathedral, possibly containing a monument, to serve as a war memorial but the idea was abandoned early in 1919 due to a lack of funds. Another proposal which attracted attention in the local media was for the construction of a new wing at the Royal Devon and Exeter Hospital. The idea of building a war memorial at all proved controversial—the chairman of the local branch of the National Federation of Discharged and Demobilized Sailors and Soldiers felt that the funds would be better spent caring for surviving veterans and condemned the idea of a memorial as a "useless waste of money". Devon County Council formed the County War Memorial Committee, chaired by Hugh Fortescue, 4th Earl Fortescue, to consider 23 proposals including several submitted by the public.

The committee was reliant on public donations and realised that it was unlikely to raise a large sum of money as communities across Devon would be focusing on their own commemorations and commissioning individual war memorials. Despite this, the committee was determined to erect some sort of memorial to the county's war dead, and as a compromise sought a simple but elegant monument. They commissioned Lutyens in 1920 and opted for his War Cross design. The committee considered several potential sites, including Cawsand Beacon on Dartmoor and the Haldon Hills in south Devon, but the committee's preferred location was the cathedral close of Exeter, Devon's county town. The specific site was chosen so that the memorial would be visible from the High Street and Broadgate. With its remaining funds, the Devon County War Memorial Committee supported the construction of a battlefield memorial at La Ville-aux-Bois-lès-Pontavert in France to honour the 2nd Battalion of the Devonshire Regiment, who endured particularly heavy fighting at Bois des Buttes during the Third Battle of the Aisne.

The memorial is one of two major war memorials in Exeter, the other being the Exeter City War Memorial in Northernhay Gardens (the former grounds of Rougemont Castle). Exeter Cathedral also contains memorials to the Devonshire Regiment and the Wessex Field Ambulance. The city war memorial was the responsibility of a separate committee under the authority of Exeter City Council. The city and county memorial committees conspicuously failed to co-operate. According to Sir James Owen, chairman of the city committee, the city offered a joint committee but the county "slammed the door in our face", while Lord Fortescue accused the city of proceeding with its own project without any discussion with the county. Both committees wanted to design the principal memorial for Devon with the other simply contributing funds, but neither was willing to relinquish control. The result was that two very different memorials were constructed in Exeter—the city's memorial takes the form of a figure of Victory on a large pedestal surrounded by further sculptures to form a cross.

== History and design ==
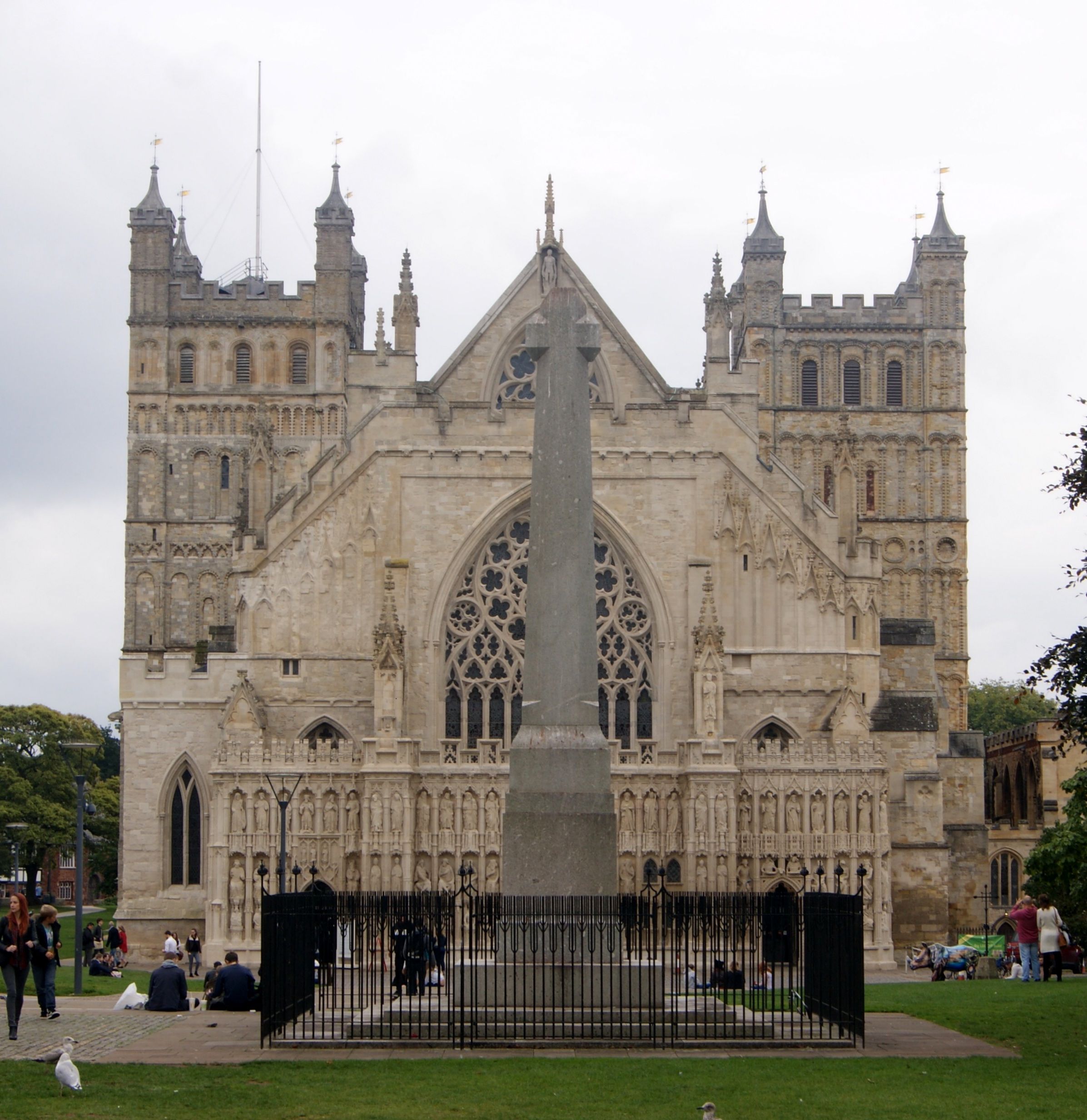
A view of the memorial and Exeter Cathedral

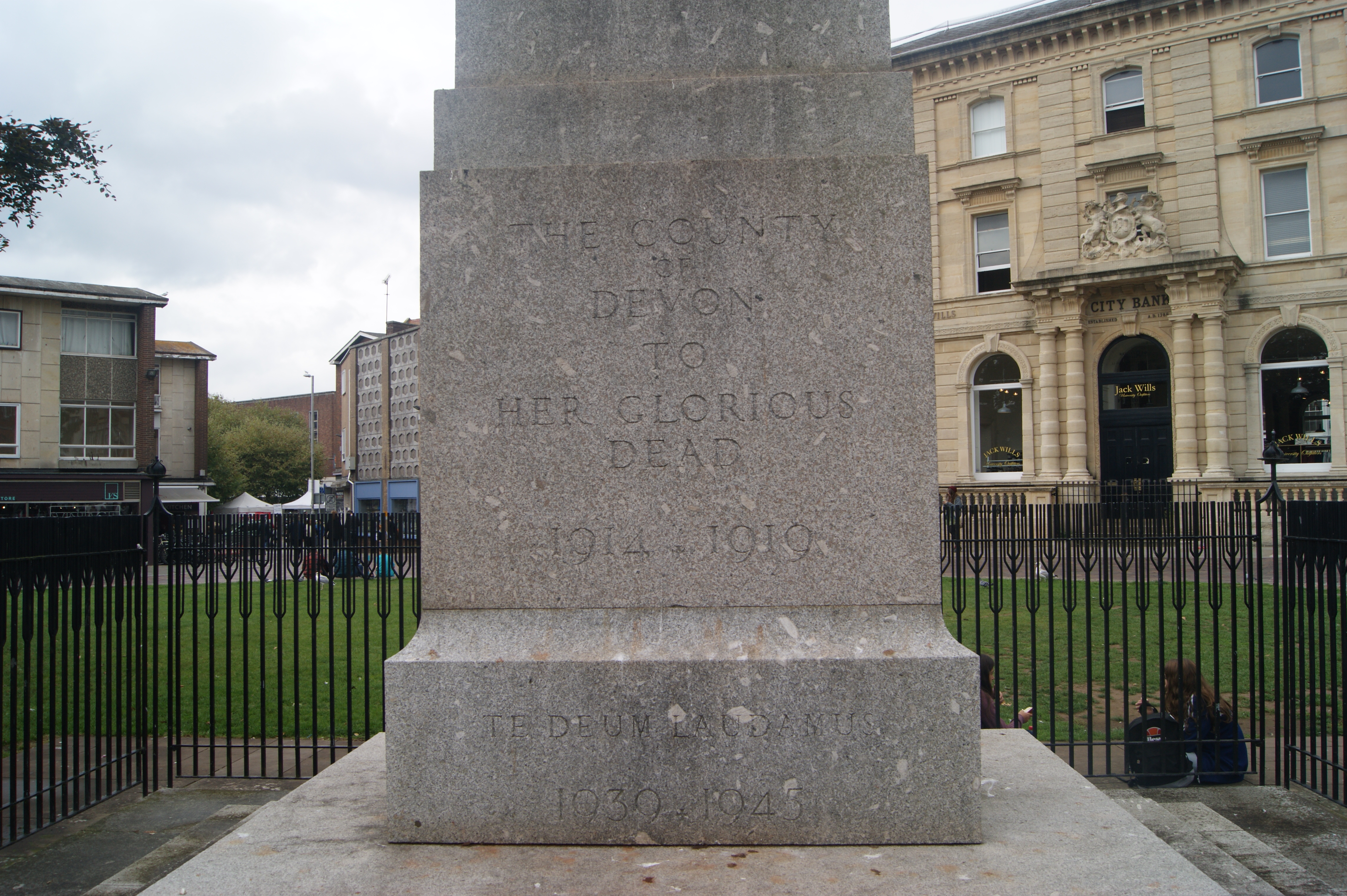
Detail of the inscription on the base

The project proceeded simply once the design was agreed. The memorial was built on the Cathedral Green, just to the west of the cathedral itself, in alignment with the altar—according to historian Hazel Harvey, "it faces east, standing on a hypothetical line drawn from the high altar through the nave of the cathedral". It lies to the northwest of a metal cross, the steeple finial from the church of St Mary Major, Exeter, marking the former location of that building which was demolished in 1971.

The memorial takes the form of a 30-foot (9.1-metre) granite cross, quarried from Haytor on Dartmoor, and hewn from a single stone—the largest Lutyens was able to acquire. The cross is formed of a tapering flattened hexagonal shaft to which chamfered arms, no wider than the base, are moulded close to the top. It stands on a three-tiered base and a rectangular plinth, which itself sits on three stone steps as is customary for Lutyens' war memorials. The central tier of the base bears the inscription "THE COUNTY OF DEVON TO HER GLORIOUS DEAD / 1914–1919 / TE DEUM LAUDAMUS / 1939–1945". Upon its completion, Lutyens said of the monument, "it is very simple and a monolith and its subtlety in line means labour, care and thought. [...] It should endure forever".

The memorial was unveiled on Whit Monday, 16 May 1921, by the Prince of Wales (later King Edward VIII), with Lutyens in attendance. At the unveiling ceremony, Lord Fortescue gave a speech in which he estimated that 11,600 men and women from Devon had been killed while serving in the war. He later stated that some 63,700 (8,000 regulars, 36,700 volunteers, and 19,000 conscripts) had served in the armed forces. The names of the fallen were recorded on a roll of honour, of which three copies were made: one for Exeter Cathedral, one to be held by the county council, and one which the Prince of Wales placed in a hollow in the base of the war memorial. The prince's visit generated considerable excitement in the area. Thousands of people lined the street to greet his motorcade and shops on the High Street hung out banners with welcoming messages. After the unveiling, Edward spent ten days touring the local area.

Archaeological excavations in the western part of the Cathedral Green in 1971 uncovered the remains of several Roman buildings including baths. The ruins were re-buried due to a lack of funds for preservation work, but were scheduled as an ancient monument. In 1974, a processional way between the war memorial and the cathedral was commissioned from Sir Geoffrey Jellicoe. His design—which was implemented after further excavations took place in 1976—consisted of a square forecourt at the west front of the cathedral from which a set of wide, shallow steps lead up to a platform at the memorial, emphasising its alignment with the altar and strengthening its visual connection with the cathedral. An inscription was added in 1979 giving the dates of the Second World War. A set of metal railings—described by author Tim Skelton as "an unfortunate addition"—was erected around the foot of the memorial in 2006 in response to problems with vandalism and anti-social behaviour.

On 16 April 2009, the memorial—including the processional way—was designated a grade II* listed building for its special architectural or historic interest, a status which provides legal protection from unauthorised demolition or modification. In November 2015, as part of commemorations for the centenary of the First World War, Lutyens' war memorials were recognised as a "national collection". All 44 of his free-standing memorials in England were listed or had their listing status reviewed and their National Heritage List for England list entries updated and expanded.

== See also ==
- Grade II* listed buildings in Exeter
- Grade II* listed war memorials in England
