= Listed buildings in Devon =

Listed buildings in Devon are of special interest and are divided into three grades:

- Grade I listed buildings in Devon, of exceptional interest
- Grade II* listed buildings in Devon, more than special interest
- Grade II listed buildings in Devon, special interest
