= Tuckers Hall =

Building in Exeter, Devon, England

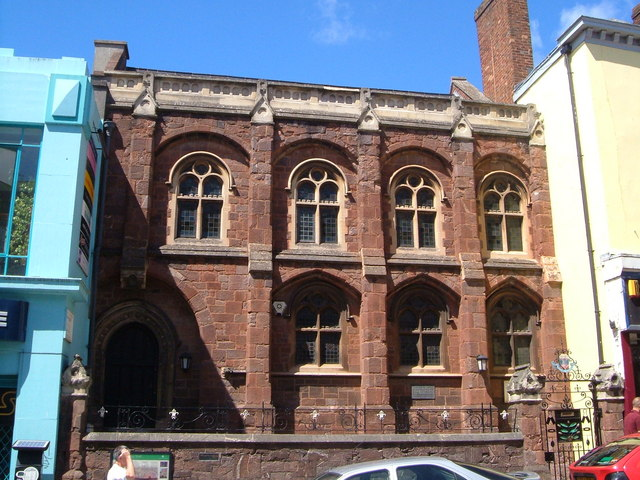

General information
- Architectural style: Gothic
- Town or city: Exeter
- Country: England
- Coordinates: 50°43′15″N 3°32′07″W
- Year(s) built: 1471

Website
- www.tuckershall.org.uk

Tuckers Hall, the Guildhall of the Incorporation of Weavers, Fullers and Shearmen, is an historic building in Exeter, Devon, built in 1471. It is a Grade II* listed building. The building was described by Pevsner as 'a remarkable survival'.

== History ==
The cloth workers' guilds that met at Tuckers Hall since its construction were incorporated into the Incorporation of Weavers, Fullers and Shearmen by Royal Charter in 1620.

The building has a distinctive Gothic street frontage of mainly Heavitree stone. The upper floor features 17th century oak panelling and furniture.

The ground floor was used as a school from 1675 to 1841. The Hall was then let to the Freemasons from 1842 to 1875. The lower hall was then let for use as a Sunday school for a peppercorn rent.

The incorporation continues to meet at Tuckers Hall today, having widened its membership after Exeter's cloth trade declined by the mid-19th century.
