= Exeter War Memorial =

War memorial in Exeter, Devon, England

- United Kingdom
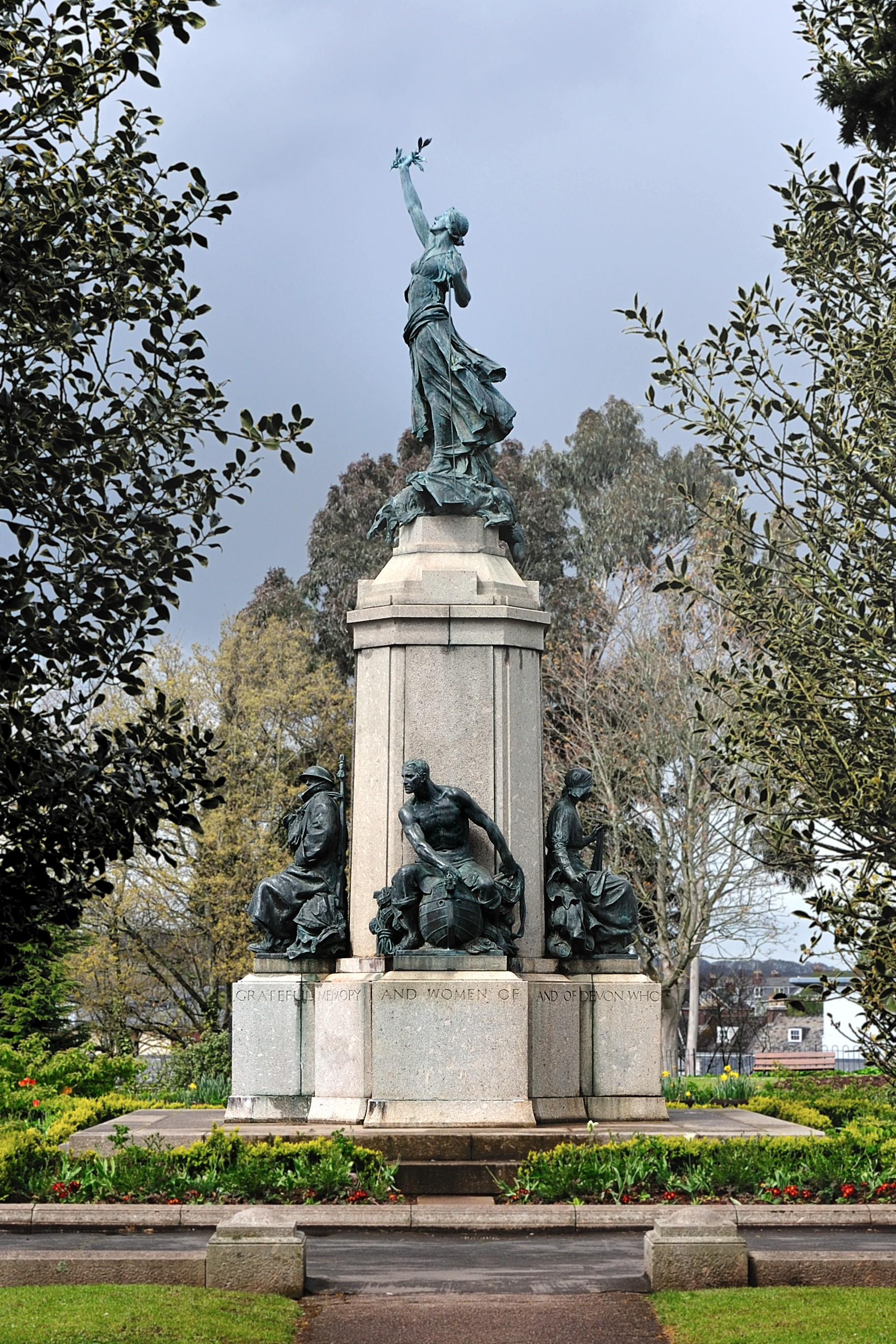
- For World War I World War II Korean War Falklands Conflict Northern Ireland Afghan conflict
- Unveiled: 1923
- Location: 50.726339°N 3.531623°W
- Designed by: John Angel (sculptor)
- Commemorated: World War I – 958; World War II –; Korean War –; Falklands Conflict –; Northern Ireland; Afghan conflict –

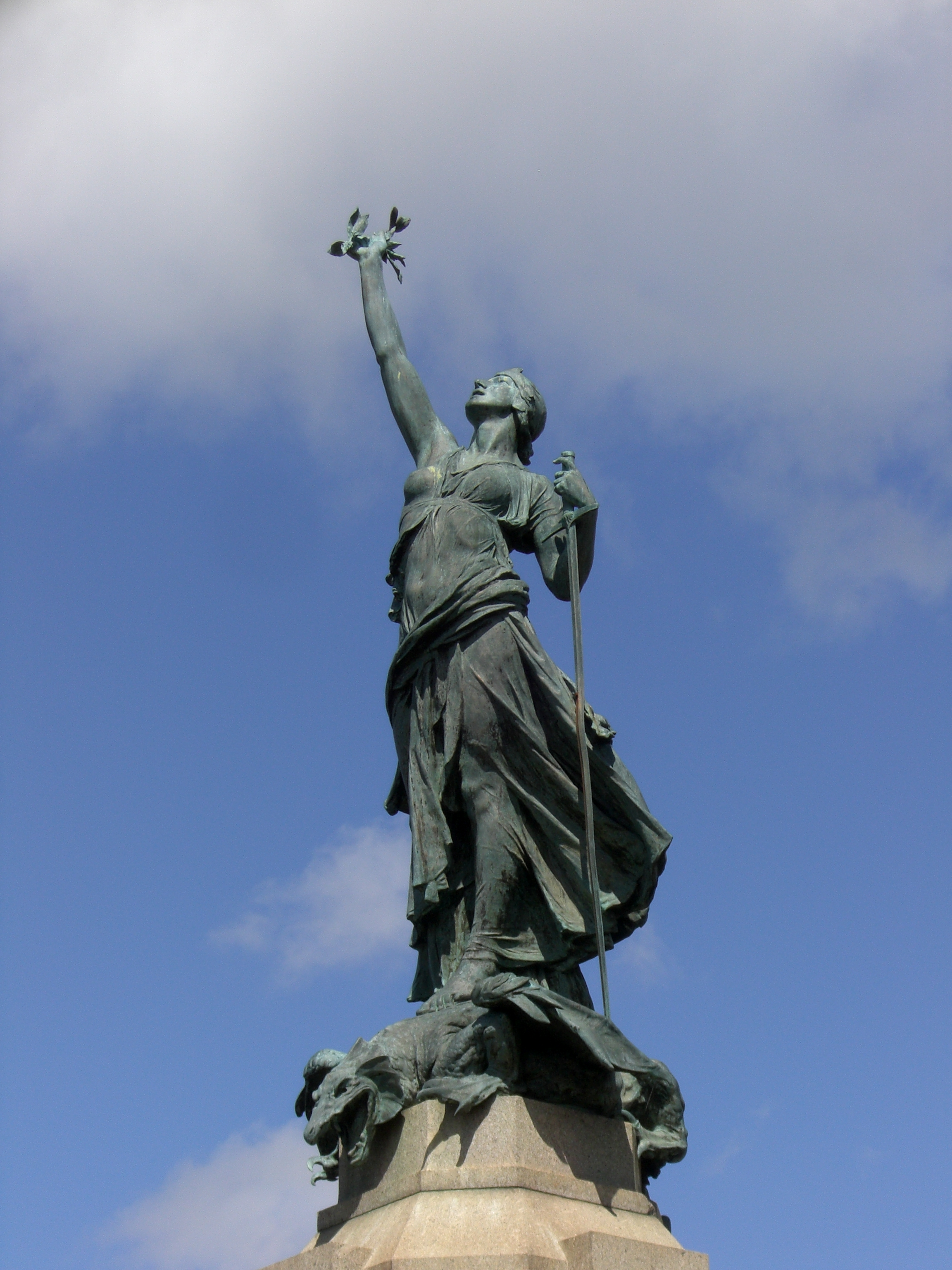
Detail of the figure of Victory and the dragon

Exeter War Memorial, also known as The Northernhay War Memorial, is a war memorial in Northernhay Gardens in the city of Exeter, Devon. Designed by John Angel, it was erected by public subscription in 1923 and cost over £6,000.

== History ==
At the time, John Angel was spending four years as an assistant to Sir George Frampton, and his influence is apparent in the allegorical style. The figure of "Peace" (also known as Victory) was exhibited by Angel at The Royal Academy in 1922, being exhibited in the courtyard of Burlington House, as were other studies of this and the Bridgewater War Memorial on several occasions.

Quarried from Blackingstone Quarry, near Moretonhampstead, and erected by Messrs. Easton & Son of Exeter, it is a total of 31 ft (9.4 m) high, with a 20 ft (6.1 m) high pedestal. The figure representing Victory, 8 ft (2.4 m) tall, is said to hold "aloft a spray of laurels in token of gratitude to Heaven. Boldly modelled, and with considerable action, this figure, standing on a dragon, forms an interesting silhouette from all sides." On each of the four arms of the cross is a bronze figure representing the war, including a soldier, a sailor on the hull of a ship, a prisoner of war, and a V.A.D. nurse in uniform holding a bandage. The figures would each be 7 ft 4 in (2.2 m) in height if they were standing.

The dedication ceremony for the memorial was celebrated by the Bishop of Crediton Robert Trefusis. It was unveiled by the Right Honourable Admiral David Beatty, 1st Earl Beatty. Ceremonies were concluded by a trumpeter on Athelstan's Tower who played The Last Post.

During World War II a tall brick wall was built around the memorial, leaving just the figure on top visible, to protect it against possible bomb damage. After the war additional bronze plaques were added on the base to honour the service personnel killed in that conflict.

The memorial is one of two civic memorials in Exeter, the other being the Devon County War Memorial by Sir Edwin Lutyens, in the form a simple cross outside Exeter Cathedral. The two memorials were the responsibility of separate committees; the city and county memorial committees conspicuously failed to work together. According to Sir James Owen, chairman of the Exeter City War Memorial Committee, the city offered a joint committee but the county "slammed the door in our face", while Hugh Fortescue, 4th Earl Fortescue, chairman of the Devon County War Memorial Committee, accused the city of proceeding with its own project without any discussion with the county.

== 21st century events ==
In November 2010, following the death of Harry Patch, the last English survivor of World War I trench warfare, a ceremony was held at the memorial. Devon historian Dr. Todd Gray noted that with his death, the time for remembrance had arrived: Now ". . . we are at that point. . . . The city's Great War memorial was created so that future generations would know about the sacrifices men made on their behalf. In the years that have followed this monument and all others have evolved into memorials for all war and I would encourage any Exonian who has a few moments to show their respect." As Dr. Gray observed, this is one of hundreds of World War I memorials scattered around Devon. He believed that even though they were nearly a century old, they are relevant today, as they are community centres for sharing and grief.

On 10 September 2012, a new memorial — to honour those from Exeter who gave their lives since World War II — was dedicated. It is said to be a "complement" to the 1923 memorial. The dedication was hosted by Air Chief Marshal Sir Stuart Peach. The memorial will honour ten Exeter servicemen who "lost their lives in conflicts overseas", including those in Afghanistan, Iraq, and Northern Ireland. Family members of the soldiers were consulted as to its form. Attendees included the Lord Mayor Councillor Rob Newby, the Bishop of Exeter the Rt. Rev. Michael Langrish, and battalion and regimental representatives from the units in which the fallen had served. Mayor Newby stated, "As a city, we already honour our dead from the two Great Wars, and it is fitting that we honour those who have fallen since 1945. This memorial allows us to do just that." The polished granite tablet has a remembrance exhortation and lists ten names. The Exeter City Council commissioned it upon the suggestion of Kirianne Curley, widow of one of the honoured fallen. It will continue to be the site of local services on Remembrance Sunday. Like the original dedication ceremony, this too concluded with a playing of The Last Post.

In September 2014, Historic England designated the original memorial as a Grade II* listed building.

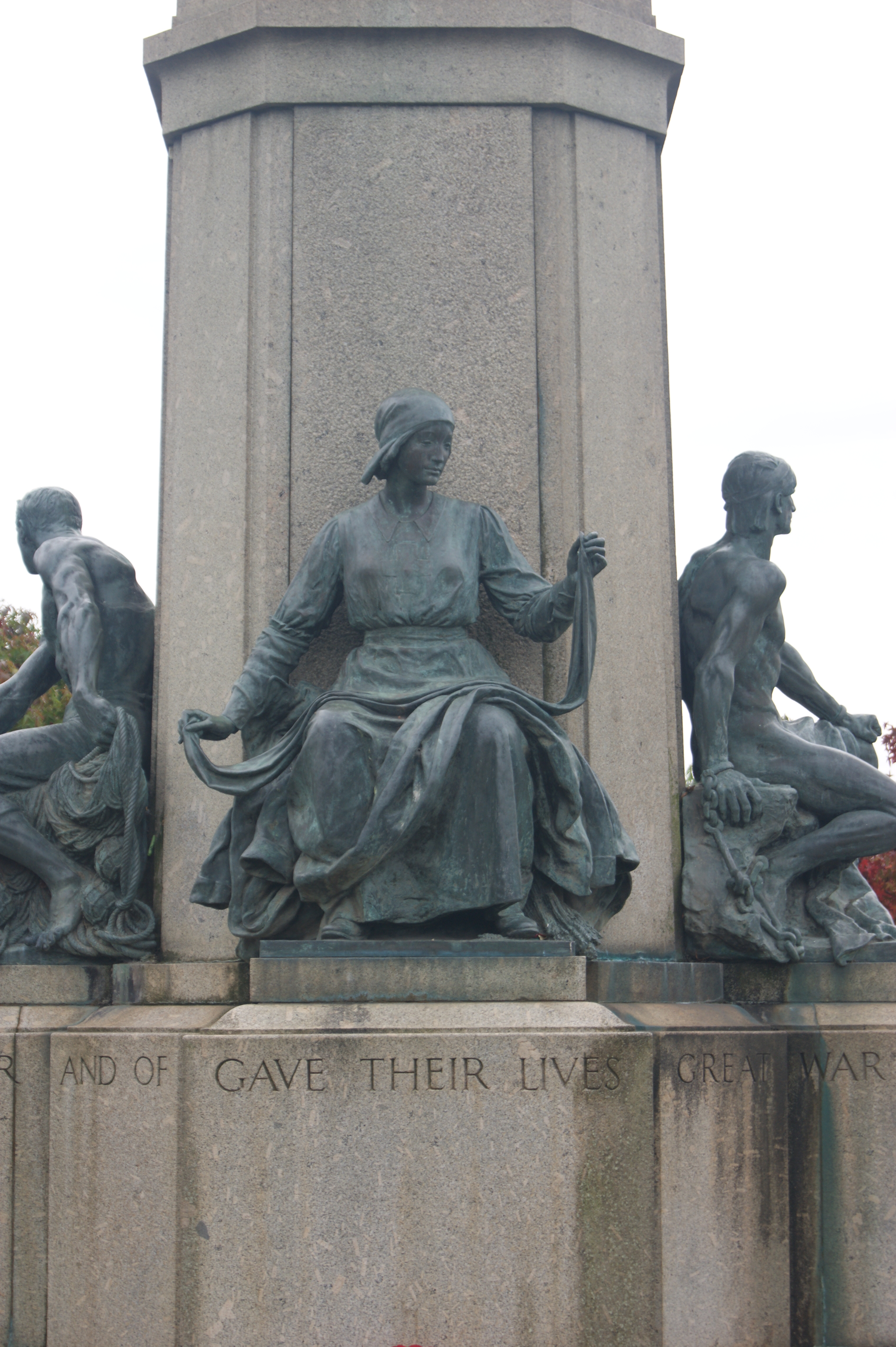
Detail of the VAD nurse

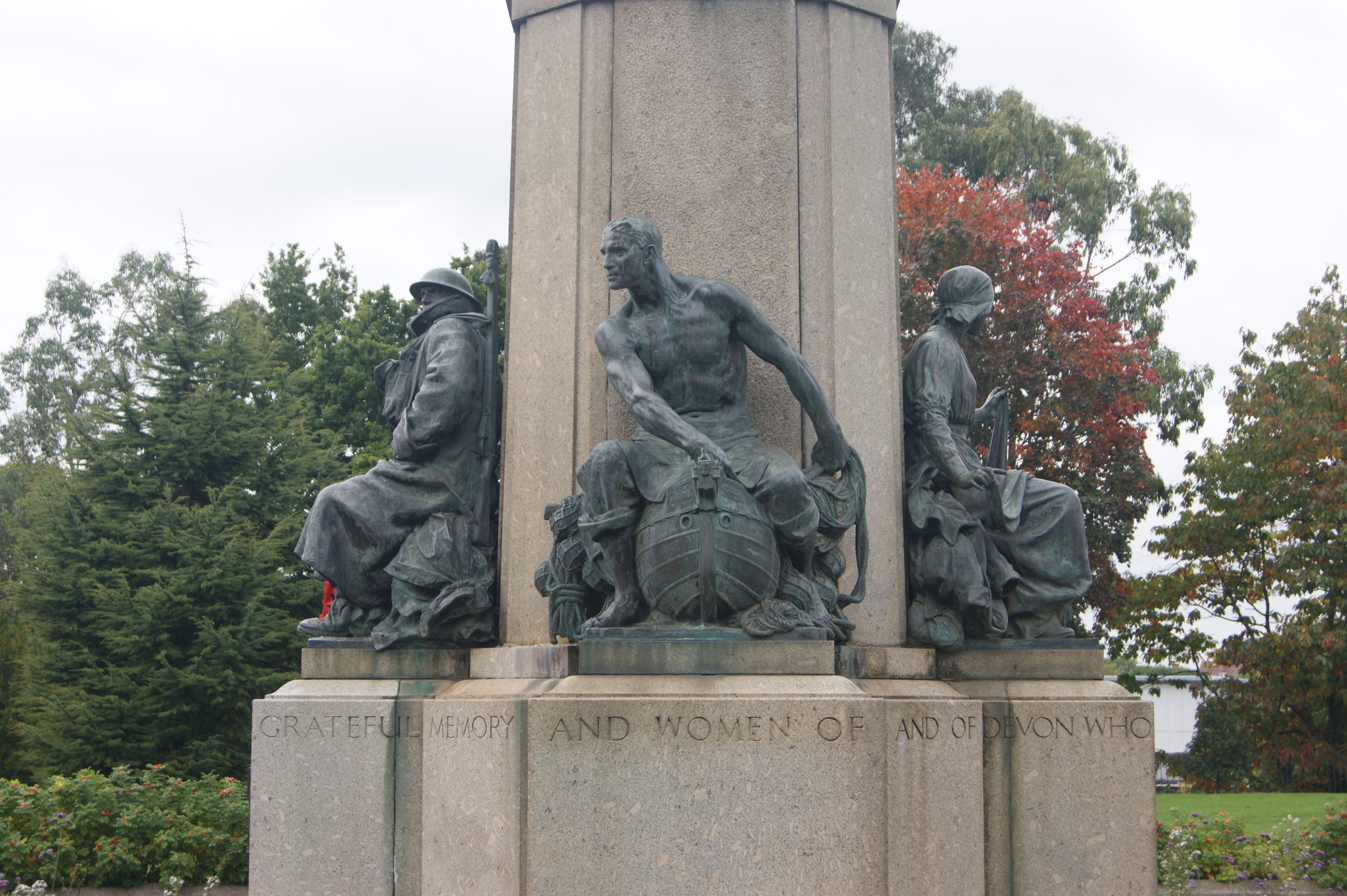
Detail of the sailor

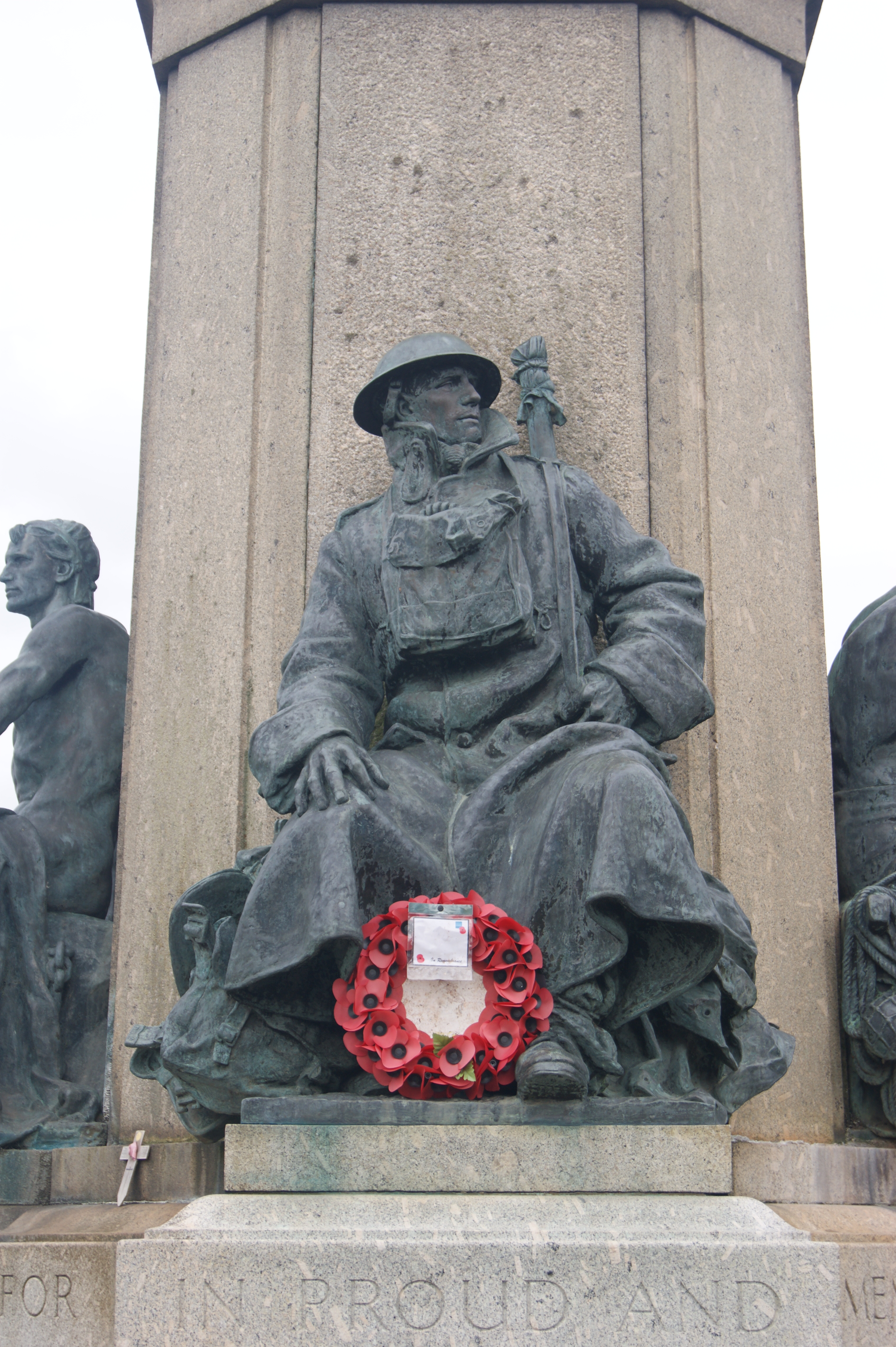
Detail of the soldier

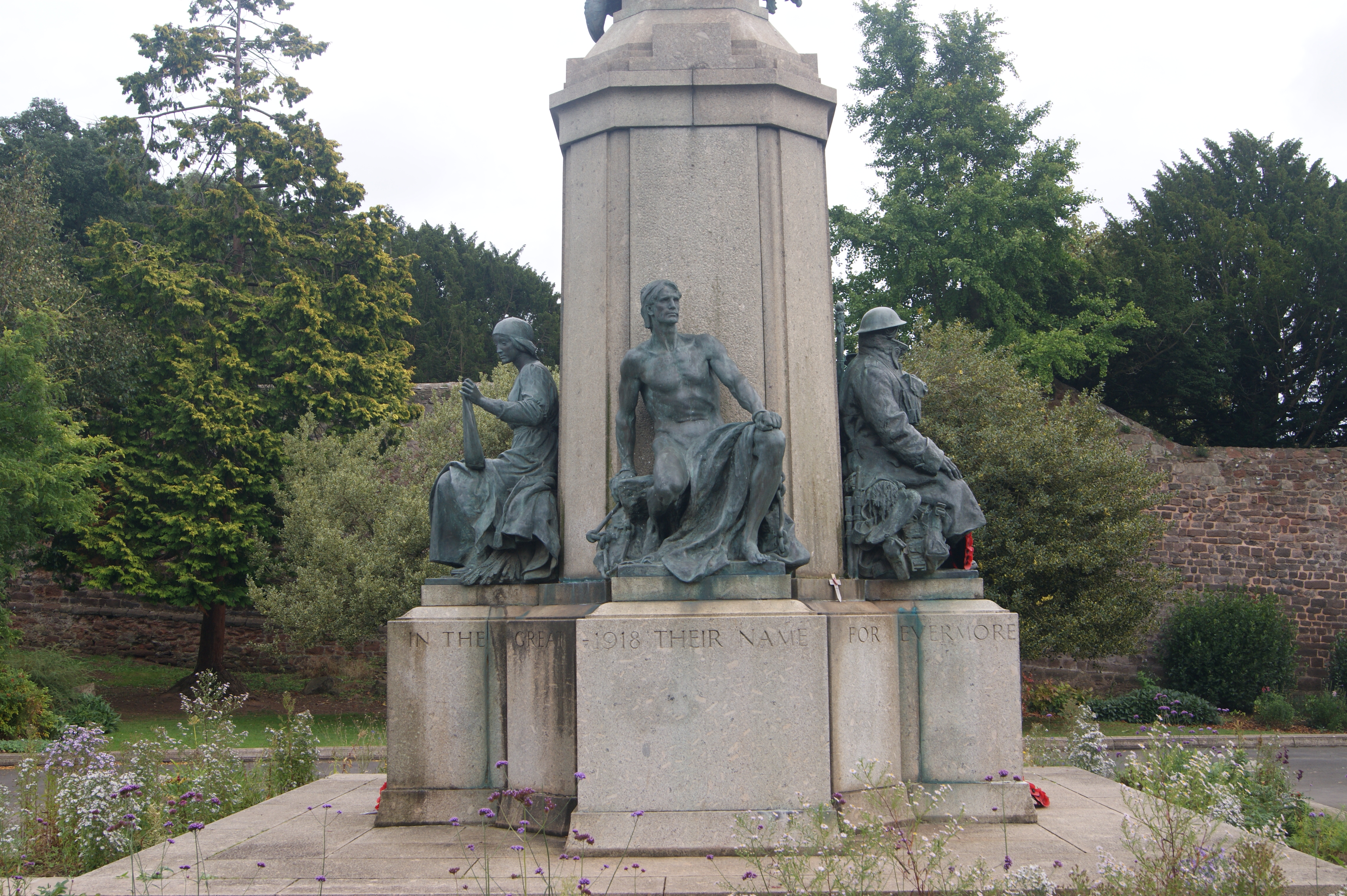
Detail of the prisoner of war

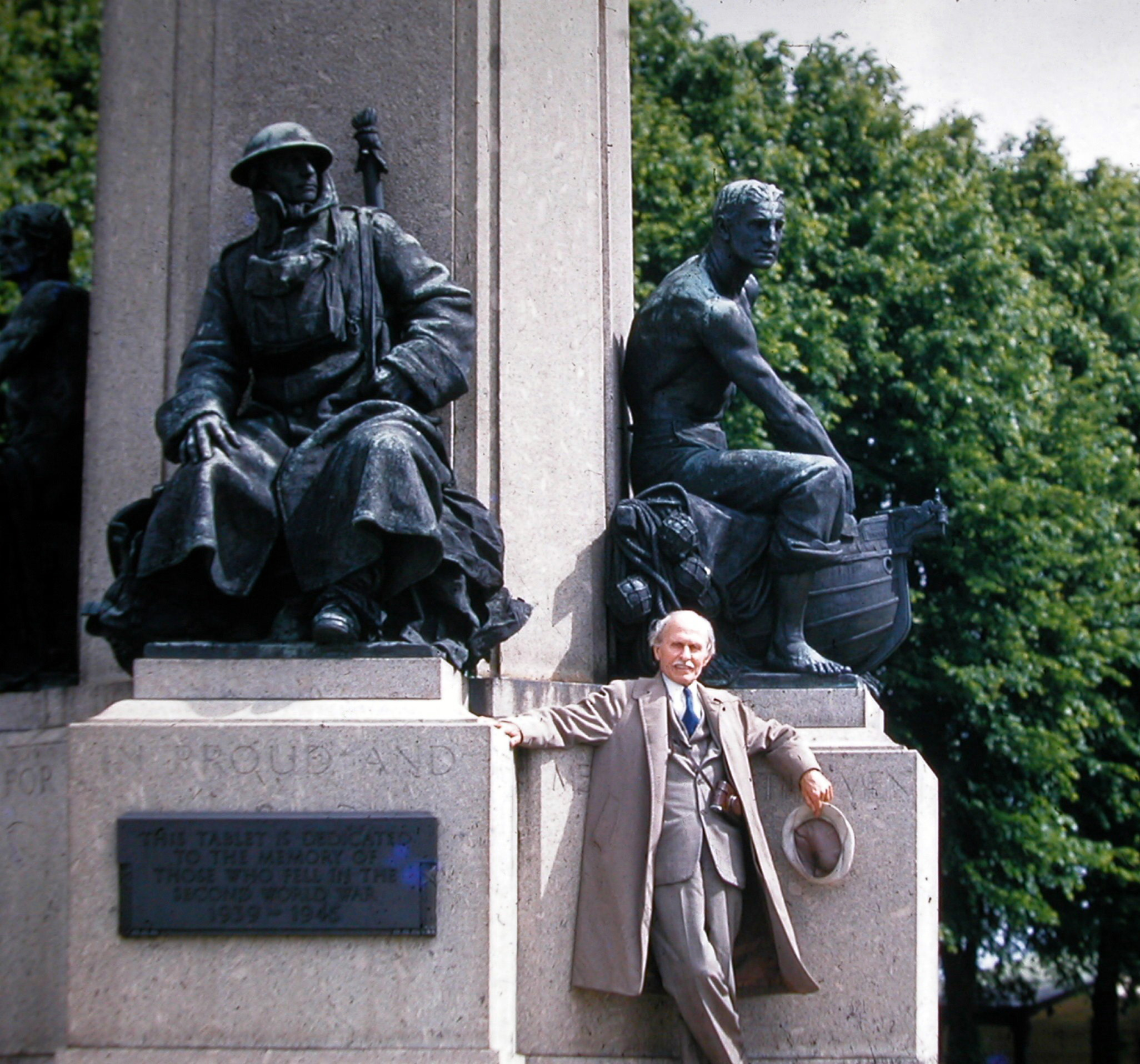
John Angel at his memorial in the 1950s

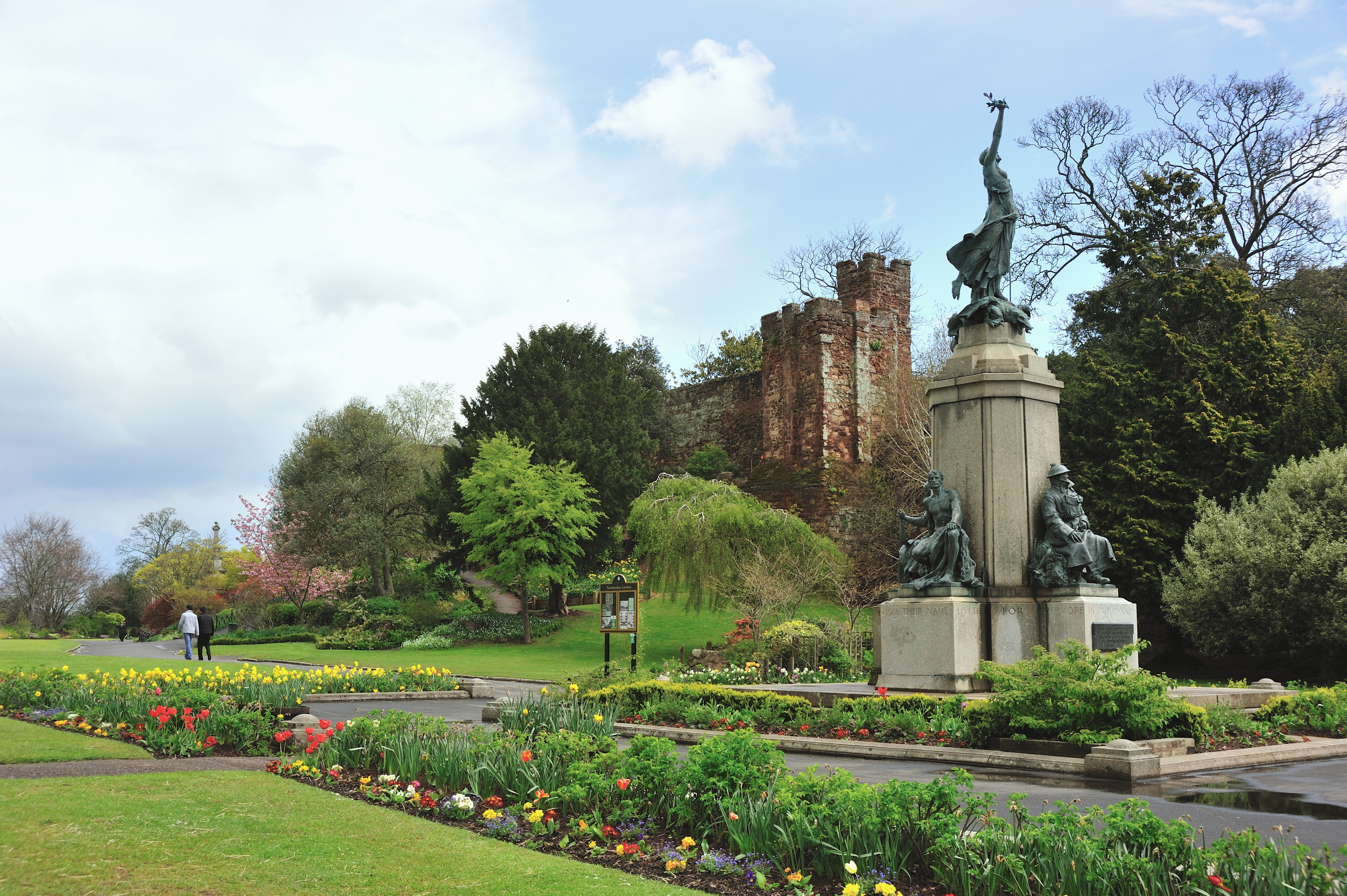
The memorial in its setting in Rougemont gardens

== See also ==
- Grade II* listed war memorials in England
- World War I memorials
