= Northernhay Gardens =

Public park in Exeter, Devon, England

Coordinates: 50.727°N 3.531°W

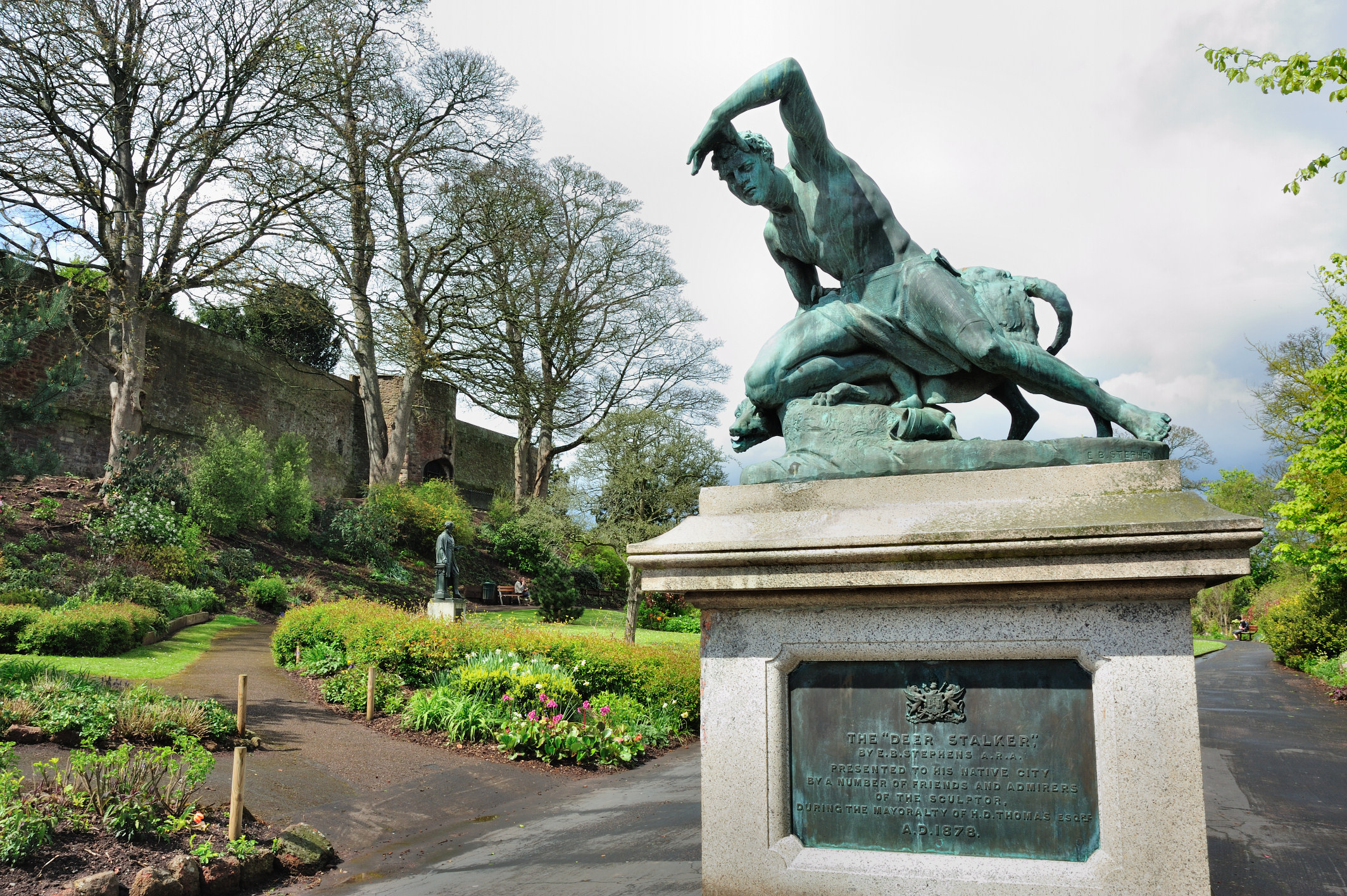
Part of the gardens showing statue by Edward Bowring Stephens (1815–1882) The Deer Stalker, with a section of the castle wall in the background

Northernhay Gardens are located in Exeter, Devon, England, on the northern side of Rougemont Castle. They are the oldest public open space in England, being originally laid out in 1612 as a pleasure walk for Exeter residents. The gardens are Grade II listed in the National Register of Historic Parks and Gardens, and are maintained by Exeter City Council.

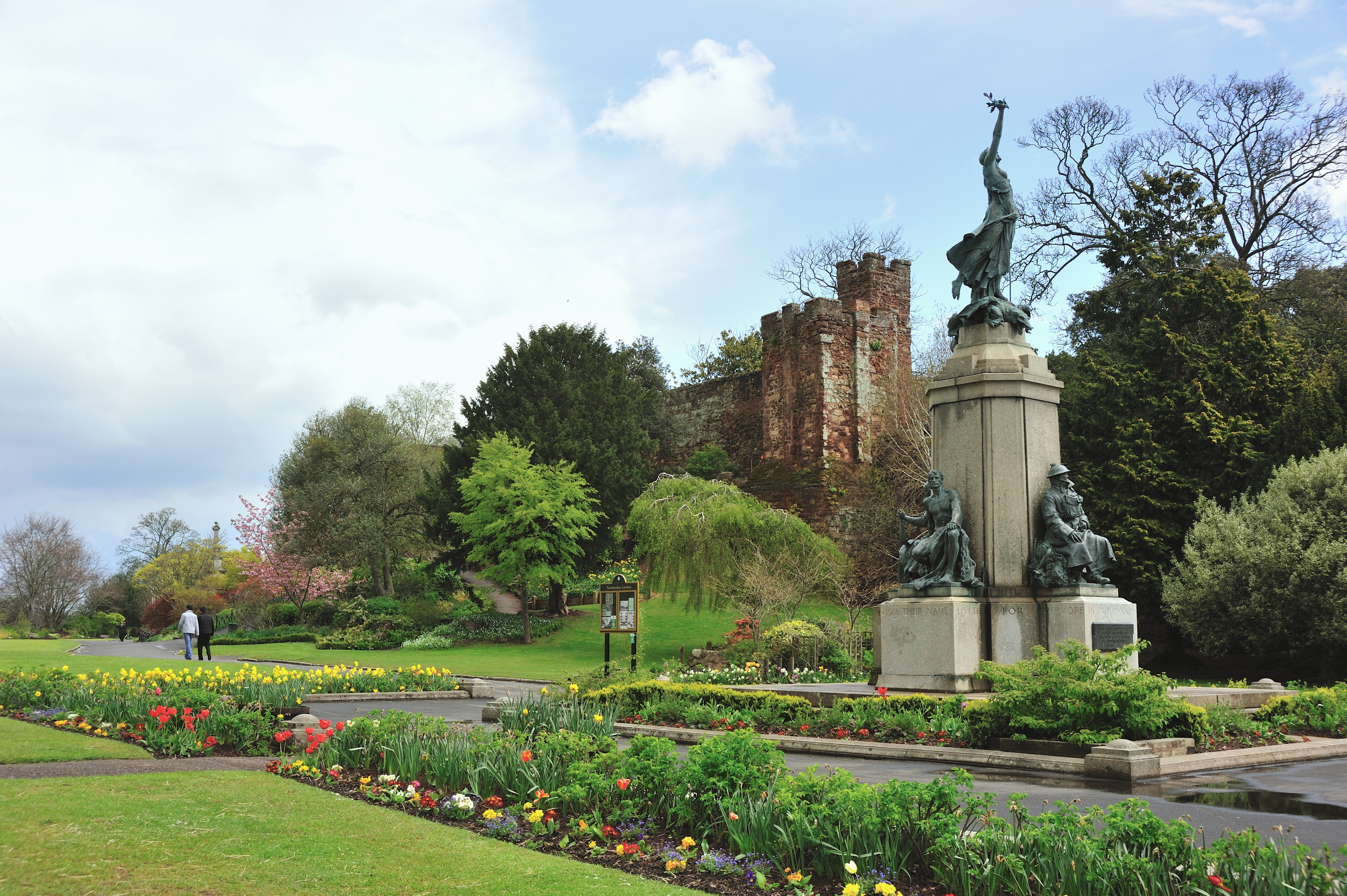
The war memorial with "Athelstan's Tower" on the city wall behind

The site was originally quarried in Roman times for stone for the city walls. The gardens incorporate a stretch of Roman wall and the only length of Saxon town wall to be seen in England. They form a crescent shape bounded to the north by the West of England Main Line and Exeter Central railway station, and to the south by the castle and Rougemont Gardens. Their eastern entrance is at the head of Northernhay Place and the gardens open on the west to Northernhay Gate.

The early park was destroyed in the Civil War, in 1642, when large defensive ditches were dug outside the walls for the city's defence. Soon after the Restoration, in 1664, the city set about restoring the park, planting hundreds of young elms and laying out gravel paths. There has been a tradition of maintaining the park as a major city amenity since that time.

The gardens underwent a major re-landscaping in 1860, and between 1860 and 1895 received an important group of monuments to major Victorian figures in the city's history. The Deer Stalker (1875) by E. B. Stephens (1815–1882), is a significant piece of Victorian art that was exhibited at the Royal Academy in 1876. Stephens also sculpted the statues of John Dinham, who was a local philanthropist, and Sir Thomas Dyke Acland, 10th Baronet, in the gardens.

In the 17th and 18th centuries Northernhay Gardens were affectionately known by the familiar name "Norney".

The statue of the Conservative politician Stafford Northcote (1887) is by Joseph Boehm. The Volunteer Memorial (1895), designed by S. K. Greenslade, commemorates the formation of the 1st Rifle Volunteers in 1852, and the Exeter War Memorial by local sculptor John Angel was constructed in 1923. The gardens also contain a bandstand.

In the mid 1900s the mature avenue of elms lining the central walk succumbed to Dutch Elm Disease and were felled. Subsequent planting has sought to provide all-year-round colour and interest. The gardens offer views over large parts of the city, and events are hosted there throughout the year.
