= Salutation Hotel, Topsham =

Hotel in Topsham, England

The Salutation Inn
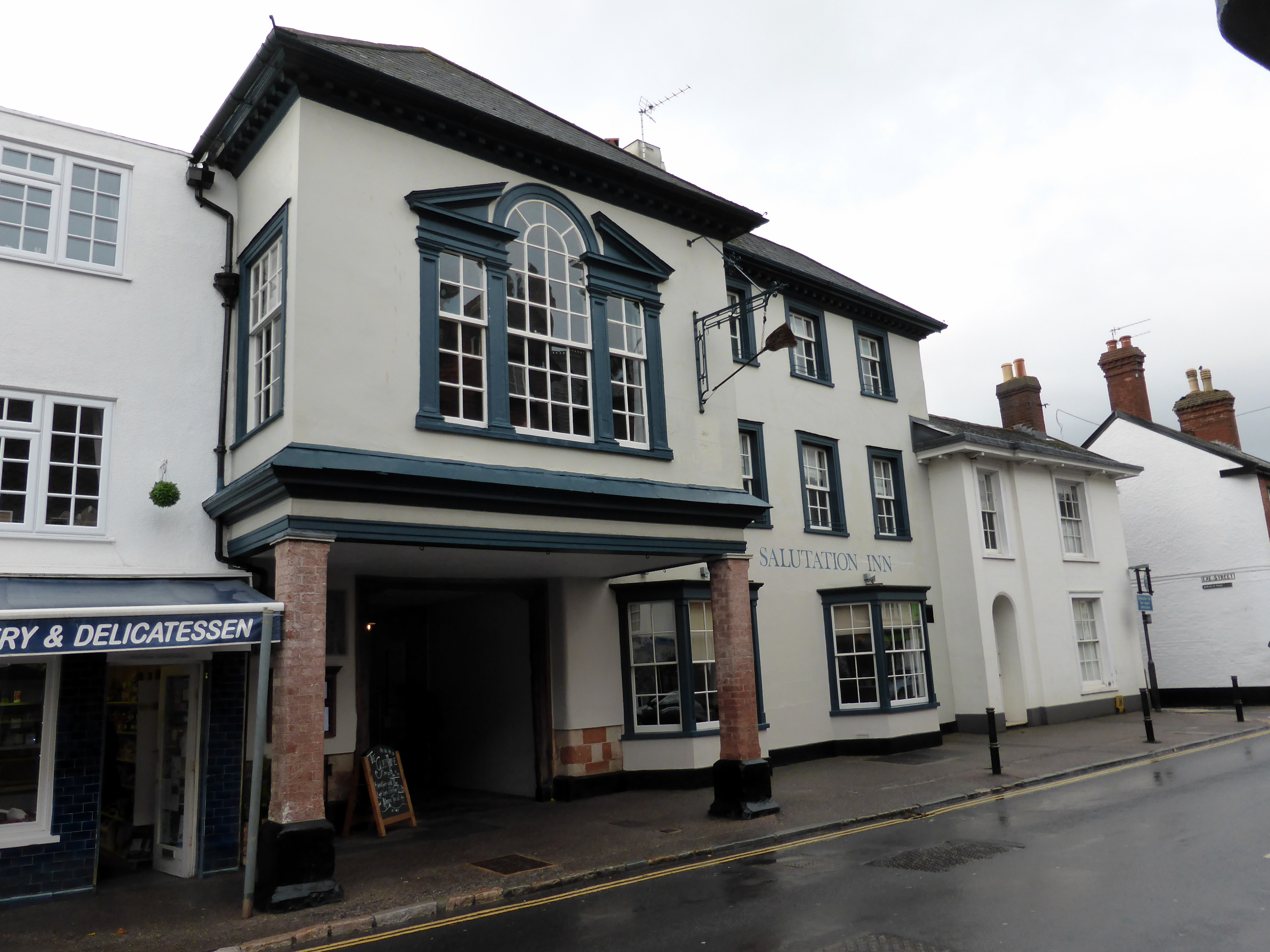
- The Salutation in 2016
- Interactive map of the The Salutation Inn area

General information
- Type: Hotel and restaurant
- Architectural style: Early Georgian
- Location: 68 Fore Street, Topsham, Devon, England
- Coordinates: 50°41′01″N 3°27′46″W
- Completed: Circa 1720 (306 years ago)

Technical details
- Floor count: 3

Other information
- Public transit: Topsham railway station

Website
- www.salutationtopsham.co.uk

The Salutation Hotel is a hotel and restaurant in Topsham, Devon. It was built c.1720 and is Grade II* listed.

== Architecture ==
The main entrance is through a large carriage porch, above which, projecting over the high street atop two undressed brick columns, is the town's former Assembly Room, fronted with a Venetian window with pilasters and a broken pediment (described by Pevsner as 'a curious comibation'.

== History ==
The building is thought to have been constructed circa 1720, though the wooden gate may be older.

Across the 18th and 19th centuries, the building was used at different times for inquests, for public meetings, for political meetings, by the militia, and to petition for the abolition of the slave trade. In 1867, the neighbouring 18th century market house was converted to a police station and constable's house.

The building underwent renovations in 2012. Since then the Salutation has offered rooms and fine dining.
