= Broadway House, Topsham =

Building in Topsham, England

Broadway House
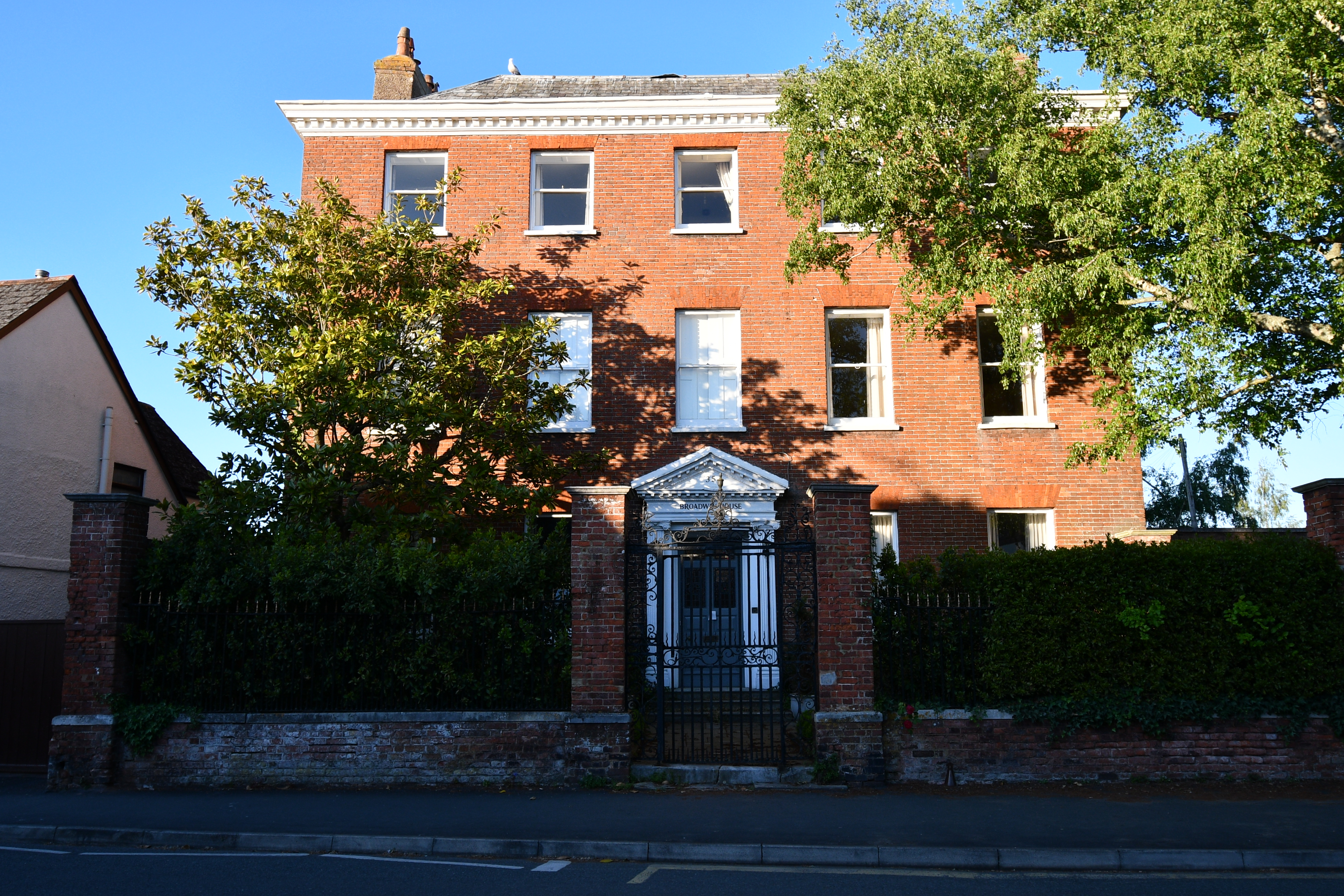
- Broadway House, Topsham

General information
- Type: House
- Architectural style: Georgian
- Location: High Street, Topsham, Devon, England
- Coordinates: 50°41′07″N 3°27′58″W
- Completed: 1776 (250 years ago)

Technical details
- Floor count: 3

Broadway House is a building in Topsham, Devon. It was built in 1776 and is Grade II* listed.

== Architecture ==
The building was built in the Georgian style of red brick in three storeys, with an Ionic doorcase with fluted pilasters and pediment. The wrought iron railings and gate at the front of the house are also Grade II* listed. There is a period walled garden at the rear of the house.

== History ==
Broadway House was built in 1776 for a merchant by the name of Mr Fryer.

Francis William Locke Ross (fl. 1793–1860), a Royal Navy officer and ethnographer lived at Broadway House, which he opened to the public as a museum of antiquities and fossils. Ross commissioned the construction of a monument in Topsham Cemetery to his father, Lieutenant Francis Ross, who had died at sea in 1794. After Ross's death in 1860, his wife donated his collection held at Broadway House to the Royal Albert Memorial Museum in Exeter.

In the early 20th century the building housed a school of domestic training.
