= Clara Place =

Building in Topsham, England

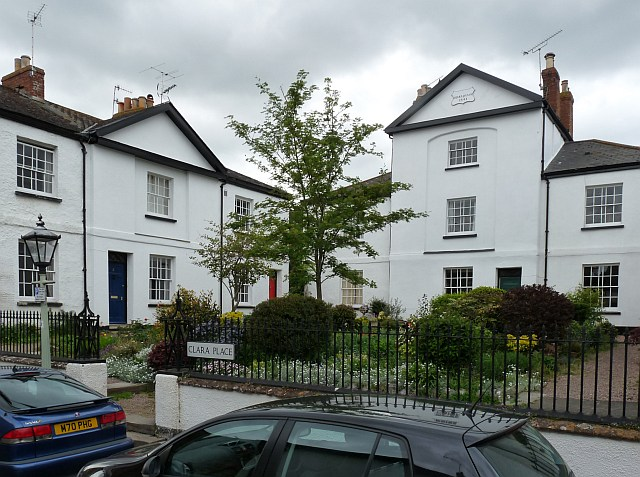
- Clara Place, Topsham
- Interactive map of the Clara Place area

General information
- Type: Garden square
- Location: Follett Road, Topsham, Devon, England
- Coordinates: 50°41′06″N 3°28′03″W
- Completed: 1841 (185 years ago)

Clara Place is a garden square in Topsham, Devon. It was built in 1841 and is Grade II* listed.

== Architecture ==
The square is composed of a three-sided courtyard of three blocks, each of three houses. The fourth side faces the road, with central steps up from the road and iron railings, which also date from 1841 and are Grade II* listed. Each block is headed by a central pediment with the central block higher than the others at three storeys.

Clara Place is one of the only Victorian examples of Topsham's notable historic buildings.

== History ==
Clara Place was built in 1841 on the former site of the Topsham workhouse. The garden square was developed by William Clapp, who named it after his wife Clara.

According to Nikolaus Pevsner, Clara Place was described as "a neat building ... for the accommodation of decent folks".
