= Rougemont Gardens =

Coordinates: 50.7258°N 3.5309°W

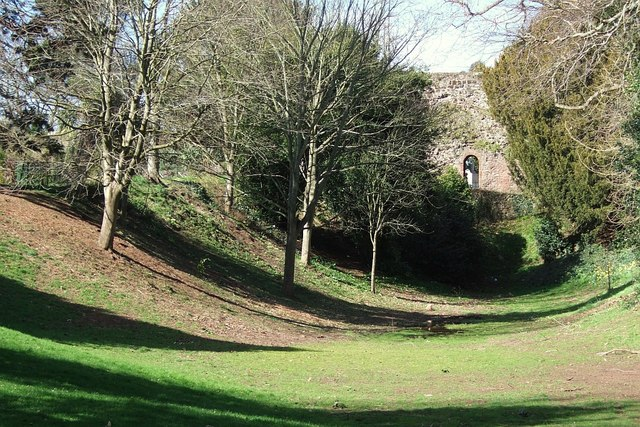
Rougemont Gardens: looking along the line of the Norman castle ditch towards the city wall

Rougemont Gardens is an ornamental open space adjacent to Rougemont Castle in the city of Exeter, Devon, England. It is Grade II listed in the National Register of Historic Parks and Gardens. Originally part of the defences of the castle, it was converted into a garden in the late 18th century, and purchased by the city council in 1912.

== Boundaries ==
The gardens are bounded on the north-west by the city wall with Northernhay Gardens beyond, and on the north-east by the castle wall with Athelstan's Tower at the junction of the two walls. The eastern boundary is at Castle Street with the early Norman gatehouse of the castle at the top and Rougemont House below. On the south the boundary is formed by Exeter City Central Library and on the south-east by the Phoenix Arts Centre and the Royal Albert Memorial Museum.

== History ==
The site was originally part of William the Conqueror's defences for Rougemont Castle during the Norman Conquest of England. When William ordered the construction of Rougemont Castle in 1068 a defensive ringwork was included which characterises the shape of gardens today. It has been noted that the ditch in the gardens seems to be much larger than the apparent need for defence; this could be because it may have been the site of the Roman quarry which provided the stone from which the original city walls were built.

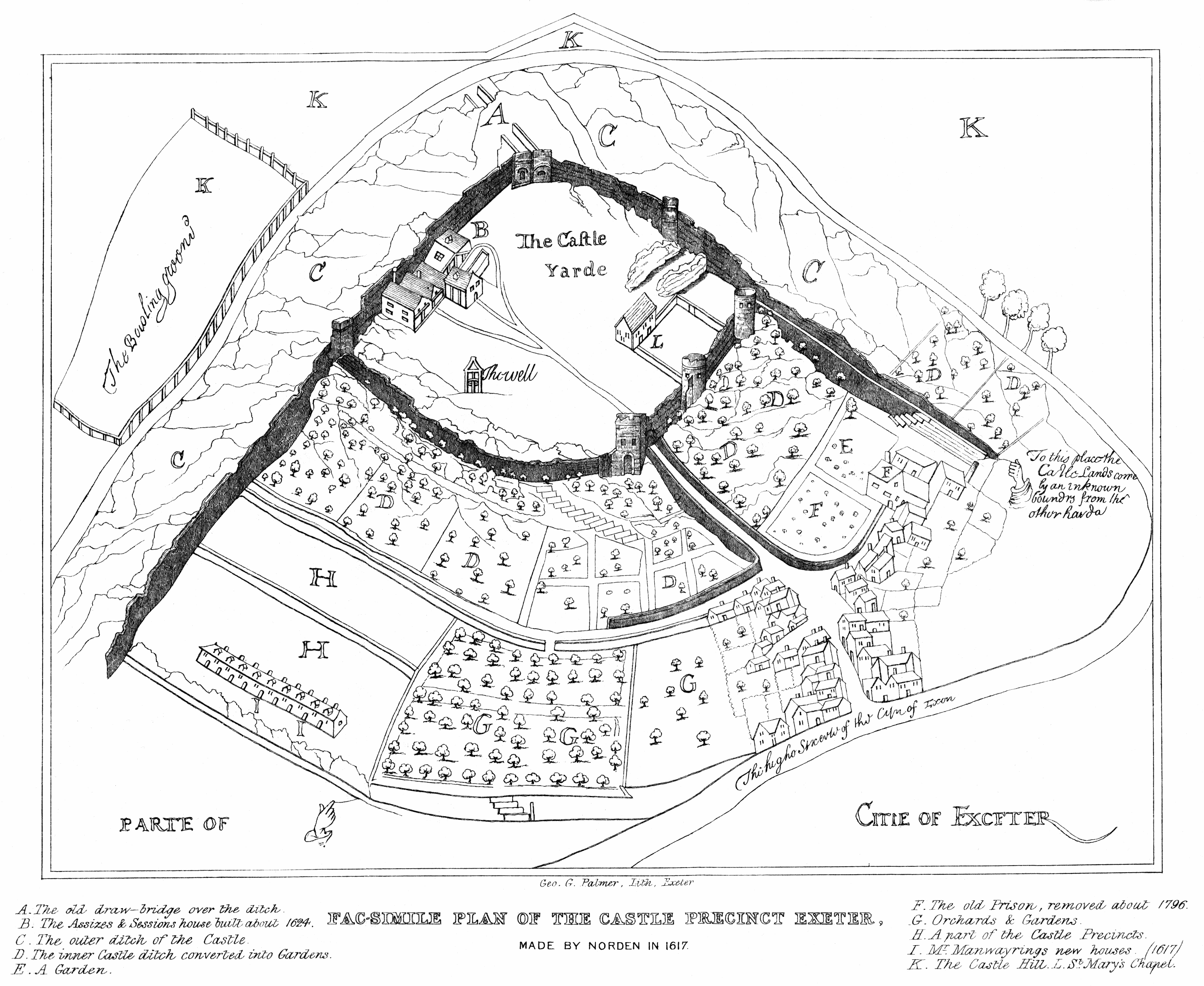
The approximate area of Rougemont Gardens is shown as the regions marked "D" to the east of the road that leads to the castle in this plan by John Norden, dated 1617.

In around 1768, John Patch, a local surgeon, built Rougemont House just below the Norman gatehouse. He also set out gardens behind the house. Successive occupiers of the house made alterations to the house and gardens and by Victorian times the garden was being referred to as "a perfect sylvan retreat". Exeter City Council purchased Rougemont House in 1911 and the grounds of the house in the following year. For many years during the 20th century, Rougemont House—a Grade II* listed building—was open to the public as a museum, though it has since closed.

The whole of the gardens, including the castle and city walls, Athelstan's Tower and the gatehouse are scheduled as a nationally important archaeological site, and are maintained as a public open space by the city council. Until 2009, they were used by the Northcott Theatre to stage Shakespearean plays in the summer—the city wall and defensive ditch forming a natural backdrop and amphitheatre for the performances.
