= Grade II* listed buildings in Devon =

Districts of Devon
1 North Devon
2 Torridge
3 Mid Devon
4 East Devon
5 Exeter
6 West Devon
7 Teignbridge
8 Plymouth (Unitary)
9 South Hams
10 Torbay (Unitary)

Grade II* listed buildings in Devon are listed buildings in the county of Devon, England, that are particularly important buildings of more than special interest. The county of Devon is divided into ten districts, namely Exeter, East Devon, Mid Devon, North Devon, Torridge, West Devon, South Hams, Teignbridge, and the unitary authorities Plymouth and Torbay. As there are 1,237 Grade II* listed buildings in the county, the list has been split into separate lists for each district.

- Grade II* listed buildings in East Devon
- Grade II* listed buildings in Exeter
- Grade II* listed buildings in Mid Devon
- Grade II* listed buildings in North Devon
- Grade II* listed buildings in Plymouth
- Grade II* listed buildings in South Hams
- Grade II* listed buildings in Teignbridge
- Grade II* listed buildings in Torbay
- Grade II* listed buildings in Torridge
- Grade II* listed buildings in West Devon

== See also ==
- Grade I listed buildings in Devon
