= Rougemont Castle =

Grade I listed castle in Exeter, Devon, United Kingdom

- Exeter, Devon
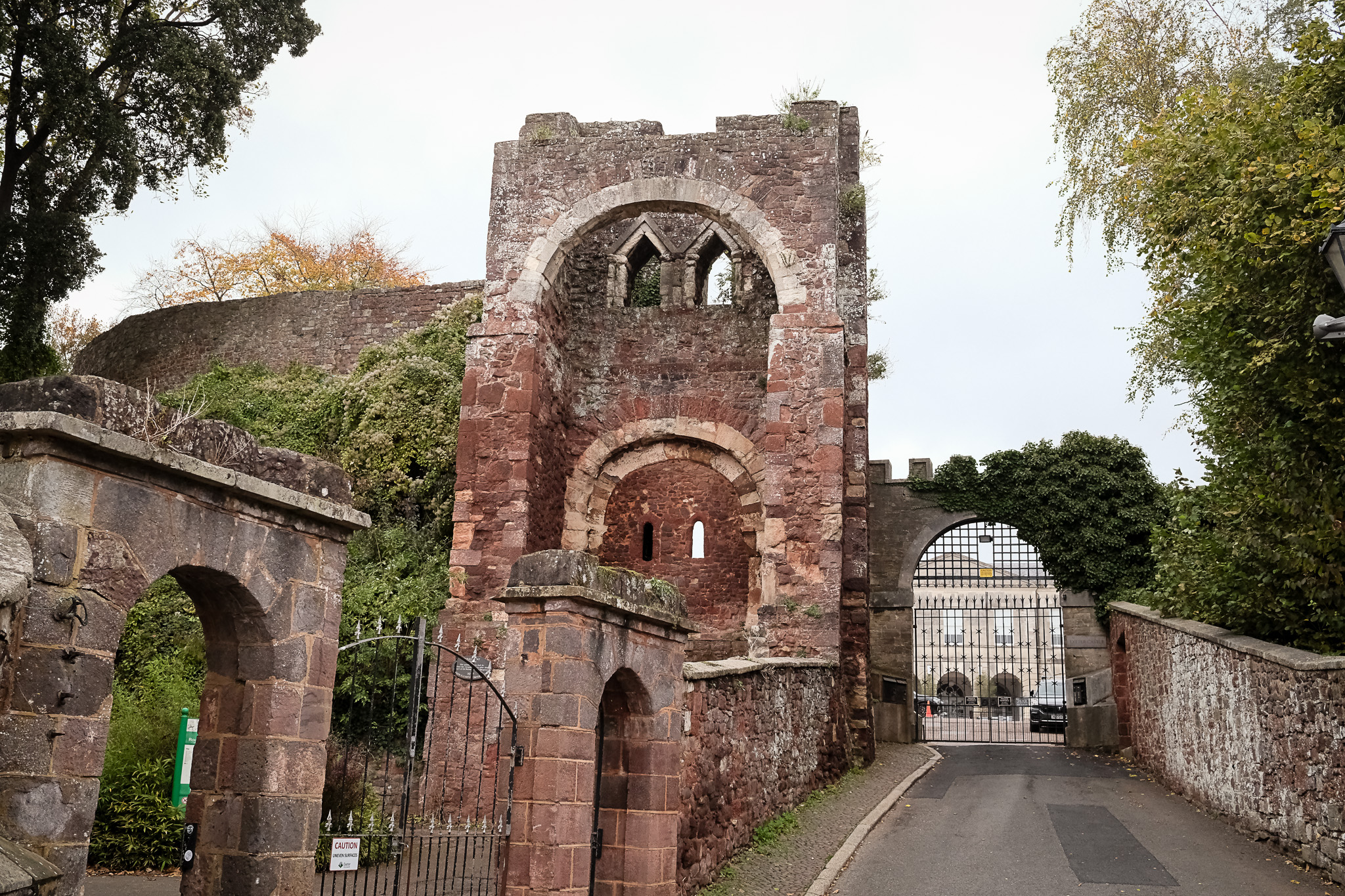
- The early Norman gatehouse of Rougemont Castle, showing the red stone that gave it its name, with the later court buildings behind

Site information
- Type: Norman

Location
- Shown within Devon
- Coordinates: 50.72567°N 3.53006°W
- Grid reference: SX921929

Site history
- Built: 11th century
- Built by: William the Conqueror
- Materials: Stone

Scheduled monument
- Official name: Rougemont Castle, Exeter
- Designated: 10 August 1923
- Reference no.: 1003866

Rougemont Castle, also known as Exeter Castle, is the historic castle of the city of Exeter, Devon, England. It was built into the northern corner of the Roman city walls starting in or shortly after the year 1068, following Exeter's rebellion against William the Conqueror. In 1136 it was besieged for three months by King Stephen. An outer bailey, of which little now remains, was added later in the 12th century.

The castle is mentioned in Shakespeare's play Richard III in a reference to that king's visit to Exeter in 1483. Devon's county court was located here from at least 1607, and the three Devon Witches—the last people in England to be executed for witchcraft—were tried and convicted at the Exeter Assizes in 1682.

All the buildings inside the walls were swept away in the 1770s to make way for a new courthouse, which was extended by the addition of wings in 1895 and 1905. Because of its function as a court, the interior of the castle was not open to the public until the court moved to a new site in 2004. The entire site was later sold to a developer whose stated aim was to transform it into "the Covent Garden of the South West".

The castle is named after the red stone found in the hill, and used in the construction of the original buildings, of which the large early Norman gatehouse is the main remaining feature. It is surrounded on three sides by the Rougemont Gardens and Northernhay Gardens, public parks now maintained by Exeter City Council.

== Construction and early history ==
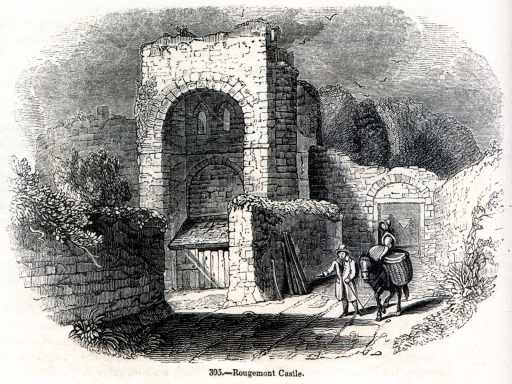
A 19th-century engraving of Rougemont Castle from Charles Knight's Old England: A Pictorial Museum, 1845

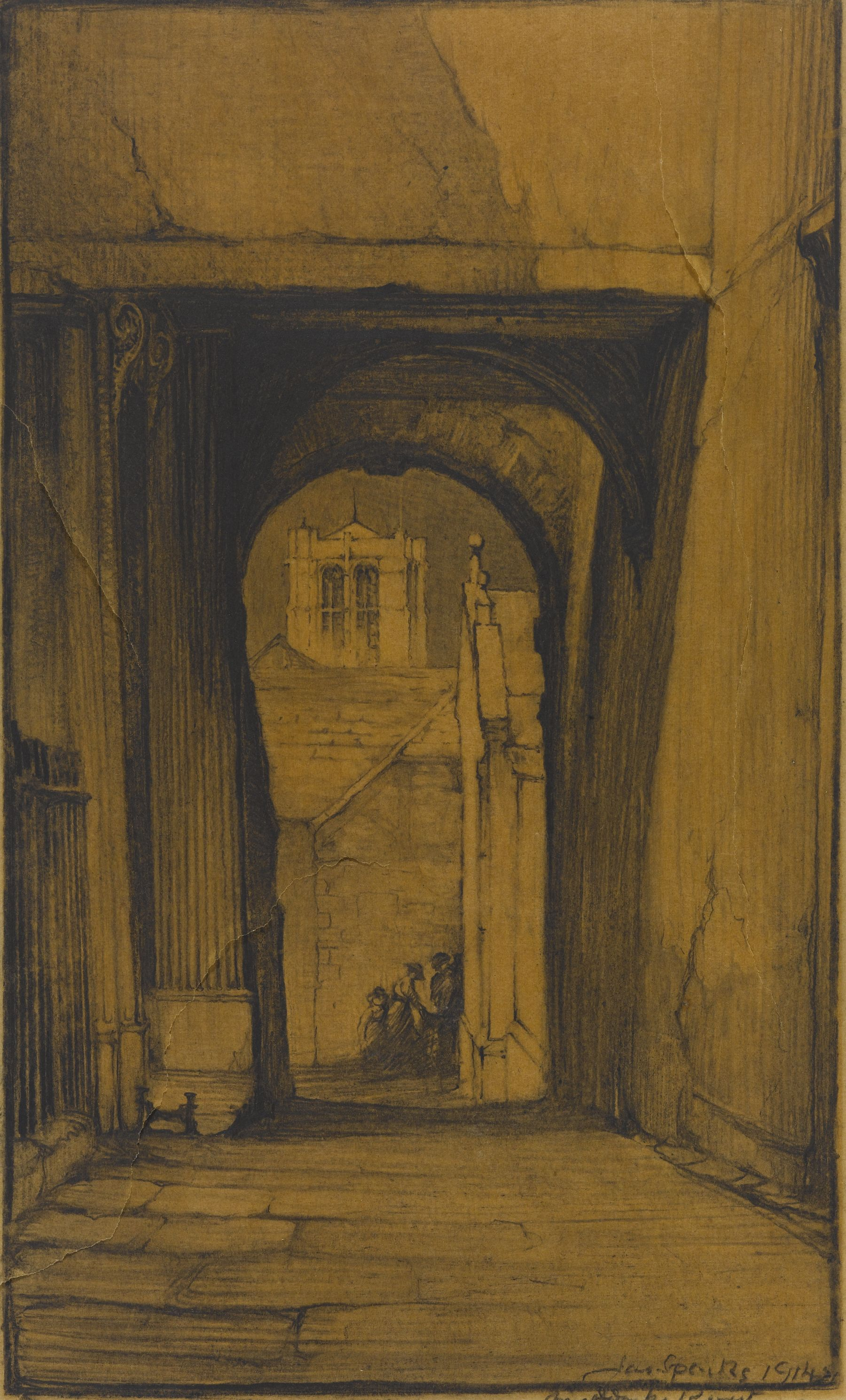
A charcoal drawing of the traditional site of Athelstan’s Palace, 1914 by James Sparks

After the Norman Conquest of 1066, Gytha, mother of the defeated King Harold, was living in Exeter and this may have caused the city to become a centre of resistance to William the Conqueror. Another reason for discontent may have been William's insistence that the city's traditional annual tribute of £18 must be increased. After Exeter's citizens rejected William's demand that they should swear an oath of fealty to him, he marched to the city in 1068 and laid siege to it for 18 days before it capitulated.

The citizens of Exeter had been able to withstand William's siege thanks to the city wall, which had been first built by the Romans and extensively repaired in around 928 by King Athelstan. Although the siege ended with the surrender of the city, William ordered a castle to be built within the wall to safeguard his position. The place selected was at the highest point, inside the northern angle of the wall, on a volcanic outcrop.

The building of the castle was left to Baldwin FitzGilbert who was appointed castellan, amongst other honours. A deep ditch and internal rampart were constructed between the north-western and north-eastern city walls, forming a roughly square enclosure with sides of about 600 feet (180 m). The Domesday Book of 1086 reported that 48 houses had been destroyed in Exeter since the King came to England—this has been interpreted by historians to mean that this many houses were on the site cleared for the castle. A large stone gatehouse, which still survives, was built into the bank at the south side of the enclosure. It has clear elements of Anglo-Saxon architecture, such as long-and-short quoins and double triangular-headed windows, suggesting that it was built very early by English masons on the Normans' orders. At this early stage the rampart was probably surmounted by a stockade, though two corner turrets were soon built where the bank met the city walls, the western one of which (mistakenly known as "Athelstan's Tower") is still present.

The stockade was soon replaced by a masonry curtain wall. The remains of this wall shows that it was bonded into the repaired city walls, but not the gatehouse, indicating that it was built from the former towards the latter. Another early enhancement was the construction of a protective barbican over the city side of the drawbridge. There is evidence that the castle was attacked before it was completed. This evidence is both physical, in the form of repairs to Athelstan's Tower; and documentary, in a report made by Orderic Vitalis of an attack made on Exeter in 1069.

In the early 12th century a chapel dedicated to St Mary was built within the castle walls. It had four prebendaries and was said to have been founded by William de Avenell, a son of the castle-builder Baldwin FitzGilbert; de Avenell also founded a priory at nearby Cowick.

== The siege of 1136 and after ==
In 1136, Baldwin de Redvers seized the castle as part of his rebellion against King Stephen. Although Stephen's army moved quickly to besiege the castle, Redvers was able to resist for three months until the failure of his water supply, which had been provided by a well and probably a rainwater cistern. It is possible that the absence of an eastern tower to match Athelstan's Tower is due to its destruction by undermining during this siege, and the discovery in c. 1930 of a short section of crudely built tunnel leading towards this point of the wall has been interpreted as associated with this event. It is also likely that the barbican was captured and destroyed at this time.

On a hill just to the north of the castle lies a small circular earthwork. It is known today as "Danes' Castle", but from the 12th century until the 16th it was called "New Castle". It was thought to be an outwork of Rougemont Castle, built to defend its northern side, but following excavation in 1992 it is now believed to have been built by Stephen during his siege.

After Stephen's attack it appears that the advancing technology of siege engines prompted the construction in the late 12th century of an outer bailey. This consisted of a wall with an outer ditch which ran from the eastern city wall on the north side of Bailey Street—where the only remaining section of its wall survives—to the western city wall near today's city museum, where portions of the infilled ditch were discovered during renovation works in 2009.

"Richmond! When last I was at Exeter,

The mayor in courtesy show'd me the castle,

And call'd it Rougemont: at which name I started,

Because a bard of Ireland told me once

I should not live long after I saw Richmond."

— Richard III by Shakespeare (Act 4, Scene 2, Lines 103-7)

The castle continued to be repaired at intervals until the early 14th century; the last recorded repair to the defences being in 1352. By c.1500 the original gateway was out of use, and its entrance blocked up, in favour of an adjacent archway. In the northernmost corner of the castle there was a sally port beneath a large tower and a drawbridge over the ditch outside the wall. These were destroyed in 1774 and no trace now remains.

Although it has always officially been called "Exeter Castle", the more common name of "Rougemont Castle" first appeared in a local record dated around 1250. It refers to the red colour of the rock on the hill and the colour of the walls built from these rocks. King Richard III visited Exeter in 1483 and in Shakespeare's Richard III, the bard makes him later recall a premonition of his death when he is shown the castle and confuses Rougemont with Richmond. The castle was said to have been badly damaged during the Second Cornish uprising of 1497 when Perkin Warbeck and 6,000 Cornishmen entered the city, and by 1600 it was said to display "gaping chinks and an aged countenance."

== 17th to 20th centuries ==
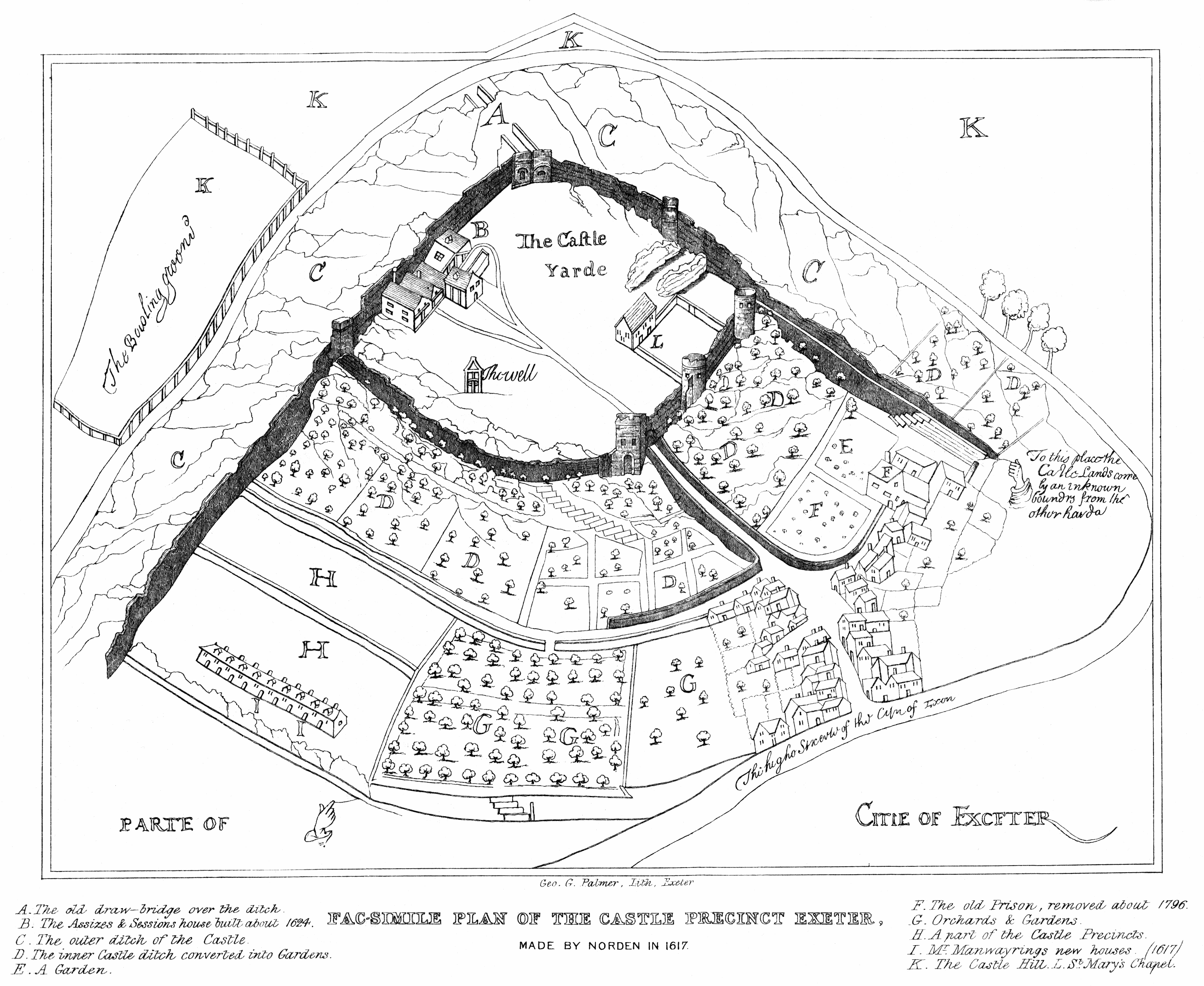
John Norden's 1617 plan of the castle, annotated by George Oliver

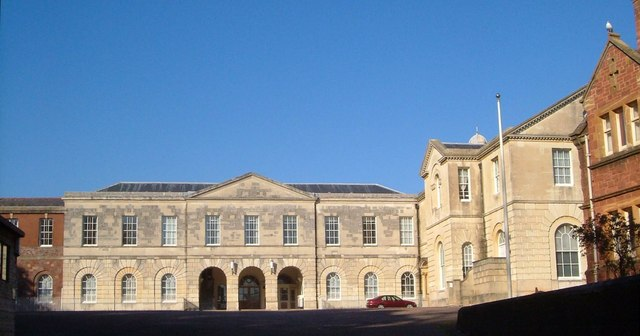
The Old Law Courts, erected in 1773

In 1607 a courthouse was built within the castle walls, and in 1682 and 1685 the three "Devon witches" were tried here, before being executed at Heavitree. They were the last people in England to be executed for witchcraft; a plaque on the wall by the gatehouse commemorates the events.

The noted cartographer and chorographer, John Norden produced a plan of the castle and its precincts in 1617. It shows, amongst other features, the newly built court houses, the chapel, the position of the castle well, the north sally-port and what may have been the ruined walls of a rectangular keep against the north-eastern wall.

The castle did not play a major role during the Civil War, although in late 1642 Parliament authorised the City of Exeter to use £300 of public funds to fortify the city and perform repairs to the castle. Despite there being at least four artillery batteries at the castle, the city fell to the Royalists in 1643, then to the Parliamentarians in 1646. During part of the war the gatehouse was used as a prison.

Devon Shire Hall Act 1772
- Act of Parliament
- Parliament of Great Britain
- Long title: An Act for taking down the Shire Hall of the County of Devon, and for building a New Shire Hall in a more commodious Manner.
- Citation: 13 Geo. 3. c. 16
- Territorial extent: Great Britain

Dates
- Royal assent: 16 March 1773
- Commencement: 26 November 1772 (Note: Start of session.)
Other legislation
Relates to	Lease of Exeter Castle Act 1710

Status: Current legislation

Text of statute as originally enacted

In 1773 all the buildings within the castle walls were demolished and replaced with a courthouse built in limestone in the Palladian style. The design was by local architect Philip Stowey, amended by James Wyatt. At this time, the early-16th-century entrance arch was replaced by a new one, built of reclaimed stone and sporting a false portcullis. This remains the entrance to the site today. The court buildings were extended to the west in 1895, creating offices for the new county council, and extended again in 1905 by the addition of a neo-Palladian wing to the east.

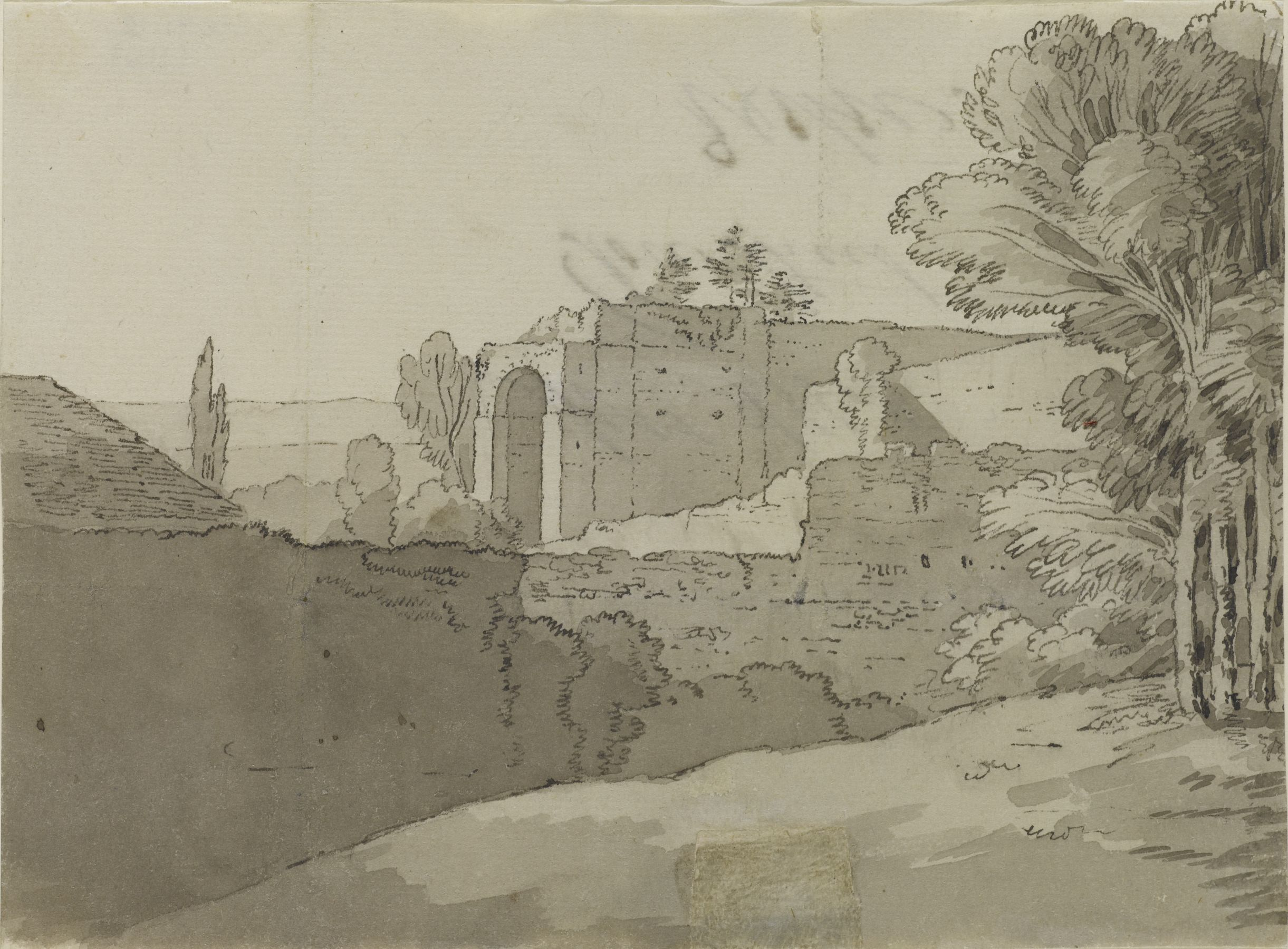
John White Abbott's pen and ink drawing of the remains of Exeter Castle

A section of the castle wall between the gatehouse and the eastern city wall was found to be in imminent state of collapse in 1891 and despite efforts to repair it, it fell in October of that year. The unstable part of the wall was that around the site of the circular tower shown on Norden's plan of 1617. It was speculated that when this tower was demolished (at an unknown date), the rebuild was of very poor quality. After the demolition of St Mary's chapel with the other buildings in the late 18th century, a lodge had been built close to the new castle entrance. This lodge was threatened by the unsafe wall and during works to make it safe, excavations in its floor revealed a number of human skeletons which were assumed to have been buried in the grounds of the chapel. Thomas Westcote wrote in around 1630 that the chapel was "ruinous" and a document of 1639 records that Bishop Hall was requested to assign the chapel precinct "for buryall of such Prisoners as shall die in the Gaole."

Other notable events that took place at the castle included a Monsieur St Croix making the first hot-air balloon ascent in Exeter from the Castle yard in June 1786; and on 15 May 1832 the first Annual Exhibition of the Devon Agricultural Society, the forerunner of the Devon County Show, was held here. The County Council moved to Devon County Hall in 1964.

Notable hearings in the Old Law Courts in the 20th century included the trial and conviction of an airline pilot, Andrew Newton, in March 1976, on charges of possession of a firearm with intent to endanger life: the charges resulted from a bungled attempt by Newton to shoot a former male model, Norman Scott, that resulted in the killing of Scott's Great Dane. During the trial Scott made lurid allegations against the then leader of the Liberal Party, Jeremy Thorpe, which ultimately lead to Thorpe's resignation as party leader.

== 21st century ==
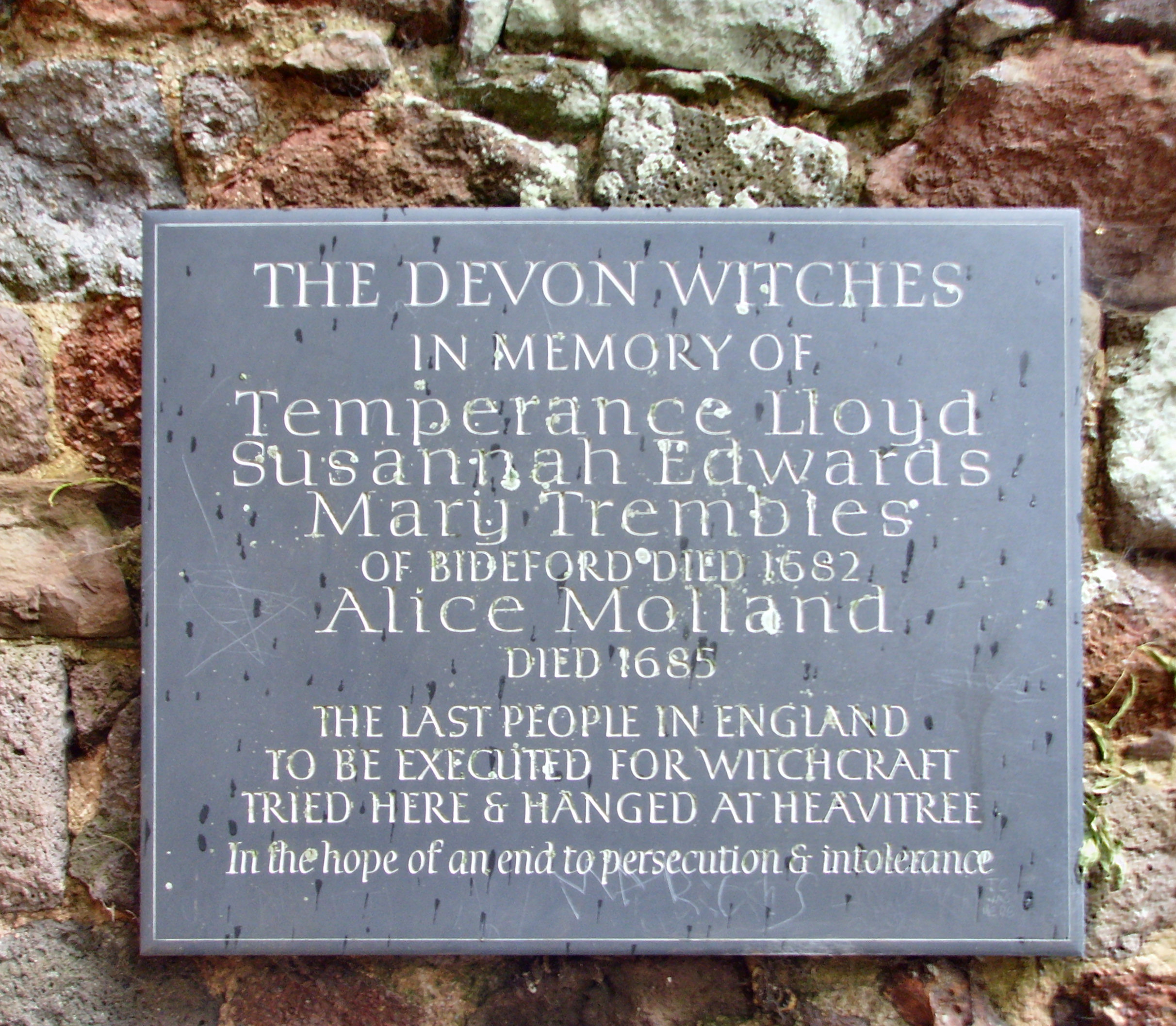
The plaque on the castle wall commemorating the executions of the Devon Witches in the 1680s

Until 2003 the intact Georgian buildings of the castle remained the seat of royal power in the county and continued to serve as home the Crown Court and the County Court. As a result, the castle was one of the least known and accessible parts of the city, and few local residents had set foot beyond its gates; it had never been accessible to tourists. However difficulties over disabled access on the steep castle site had become a major problem, and new Law Courts were completed in Exeter's legal quarter in 2004. Following the failure of a scheme for Exeter City Council to purchase the site, it was sold by Her Majesty's Courts Service in early 2007 to GL50 Properties, whose managing director said "Rougemont Castle is an amazing building which we will transform into the Covent Garden of the South West of England."

Today, the castle is subject to a high degree of legal protection as a scheduled monument, and its main structures are all either Grade I or Grade II* listed buildings. A statue, dated 1863, by E. B. Stephens of the 1st Earl Fortescue stands in the yard: it is Grade II listed. As the relevant planning authority, the city council explained its concerns about the future of the castle. It stated its view that whatever its future use, the castle should be opened up to reasonable public access and integrated into the cultural quarter of the city as a key element, the historic importance and quality of the site and buildings should be respected, and at least the impressive courtyard of the castle should be available for public events even if the buildings are purchased for commercial use. As an example of this new use, the band Coldplay played a charity concert in the courtyard in December 2009 during its Viva la Vida Tour.

In 2011, the former Court 1 reopened as the Ballroom, with its arched windows lowered to floor level; lavatories were installed in the former holding cells for prisoners. Court 2 reopened as the Gallery, of 150 square metres. In addition, 12 new apartments were created within the walls of the castle.

== Bibliography ==
- "Report on the Underground Passages in Exeter". Proceedings of the Devon Archaeological Exploration Society. 1 (4). Exeter Excavation Committee: 191–200. 1932.
- Hoskins, W. G. (2004). Two Thousand Years in Exeter (Revised and updated ed.). Chichester: Phillimore. ISBN 1-86077-303-6.
- Laming, Deryck; Roche, David (2009). "Devon Geology Guide – Permian Breccias, Sandstones and Volcanics" (PDF). Devon County Council. p. 3. Archived from the original (PDF) on 23 September 2015.
- Mellor, Hugh (1989). Exeter Architecture. Chichester: Phillimore. ISBN 0-85033-693-7.
- Perkins, John W. (1971). Geology Explained in South and East Devon. Newton Abbot: David & Charles. ISBN 0-7153-5304-7.
- Pevsner, Nikolaus; Cherry, Bridget (revision) (1989) [1952]. The Buildings of England: Devon. Harmondsworth: Penguin Books. ISBN 0-14-071050-7.
- Vachell, E. T. (1966). "Exeter Castle, its Background, Origin and History". Report & Transactions of the Devonshire Association. 98.
