= The House That Moved =

Historic building in Devon, South West England

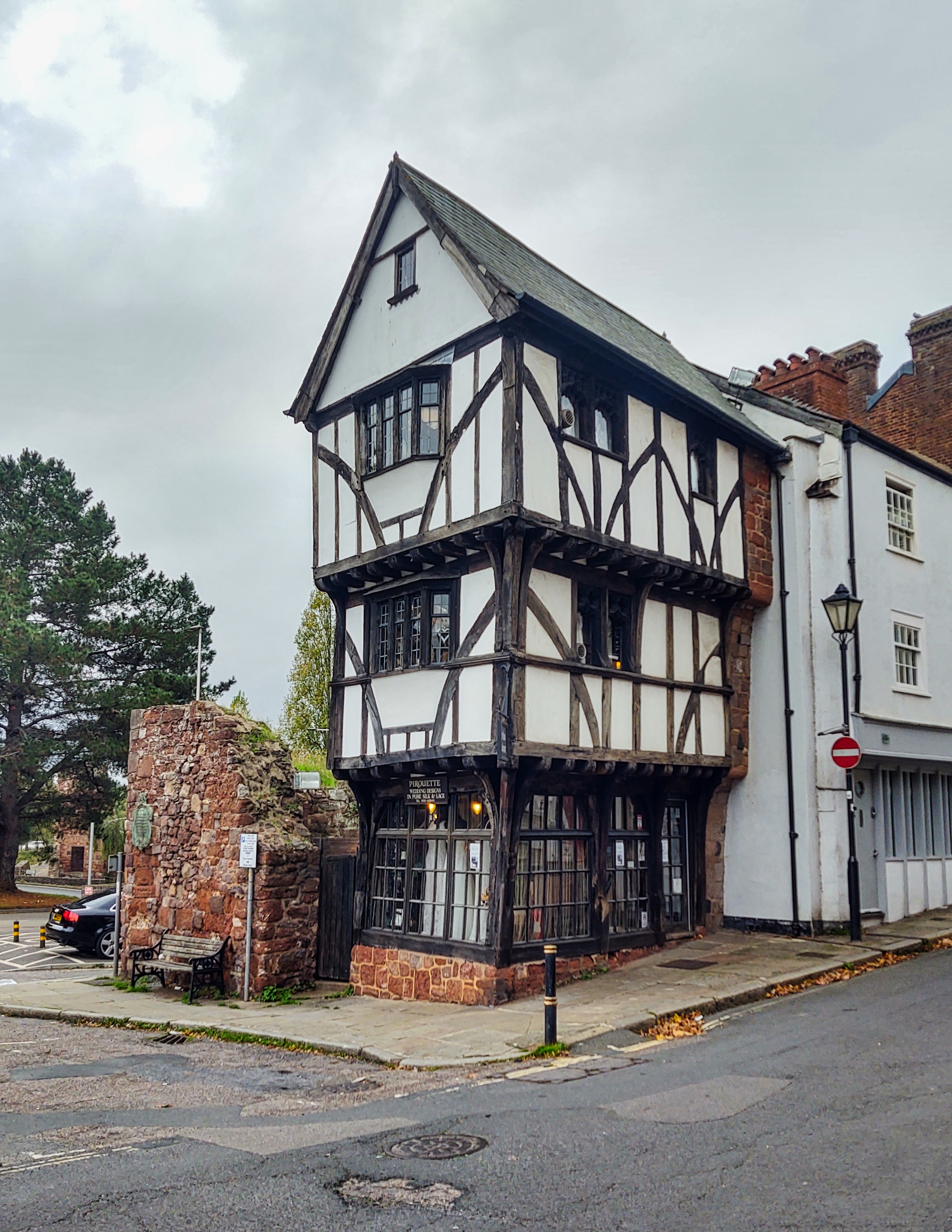
- The House That Moved
- Interactive map of the The House That Moved area
- Former names: The Merchant House; The Tudor House

General information
- Architectural style: Late Middle Ages Half-timbered
- Classification: Grade II listed building
- Location: 24 West Street; Formerly 16 Edmund Street, Exeter, United Kingdom
- Coordinates: 50.71977°N 3.53479°W
- Estimated completion: 1450
- Relocated: December 1961

Dimensions
- Weight: 30 long tons (67,000 lb) (frame only)

Technical details
- Floor count: 3 + cockloft
- Floor area: 180 square feet (17 m^{2})

The House That Moved is a historic building in Exeter, originally built in the late Middle Ages and relocated in 1961 when the entire street it was on was demolished to make way for a new bypass road linked to the replacement of the city's bridge over the River Exe.

== Original building ==
The house was built in the late Middle Ages, likely between 1420 and 1460, and was located at 16 Edmund Street, on the corner with Frog Street, probably for a wealthy merchant. This age makes it one of the oldest private dwellings in Devon.

Edmund Street was previously the main road from Exeter's West Gate to the Old Exe Bridge, and most of the currently visible old bridge was excavated during the demolition of Edmund and Frog Streets. The church on the bridge, the ruins of which are still clearly visible, including the tower, was St. Edmund's church, which was on Edmund Street.

The house is half-timbered, with each floor jettied and projecting out further than the floor below, which was a common feature at the time. The first floor overhangs by 1 foot 11 inches (58 cm) on two sides of the building.

It was built with three stories and a cockloft and had the West wall made of Heavitree stone. There was a single room on the ground floor and first floor, but two separate chambers on the second floor, with all floors being approximately equal height of around 7 feet 6 inches (229 cm) high. This pattern seems to have been popular in the city centre, especially on corner plots, although this is the only surviving example. At some point twin dormers were added to the cockloft, which can be seen in photographs of the building whilst at Edmund Street, as can a porch extension on front of the building with a shopfront. Photographs from that time also show the walls rendered, with all the beams covered.

Notable features of the house include one and two-light windows with traceried cinquefoil heads, and diagonal dragon beams and curved headed posts which carry the projecting corners.

Original house features
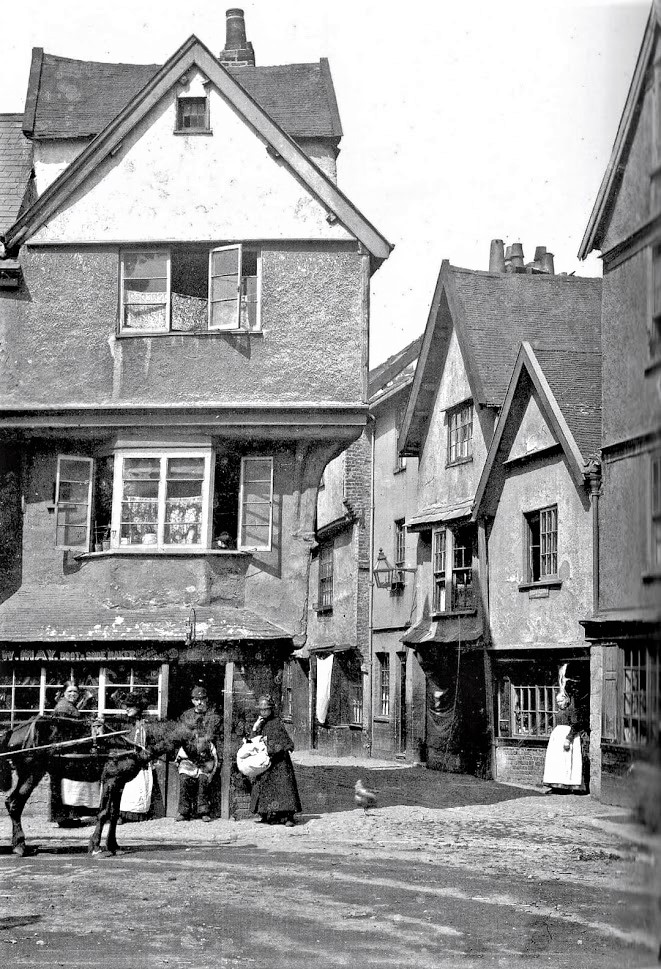
The house whilst at 16 Edmund Street, with dormers in the cockloft

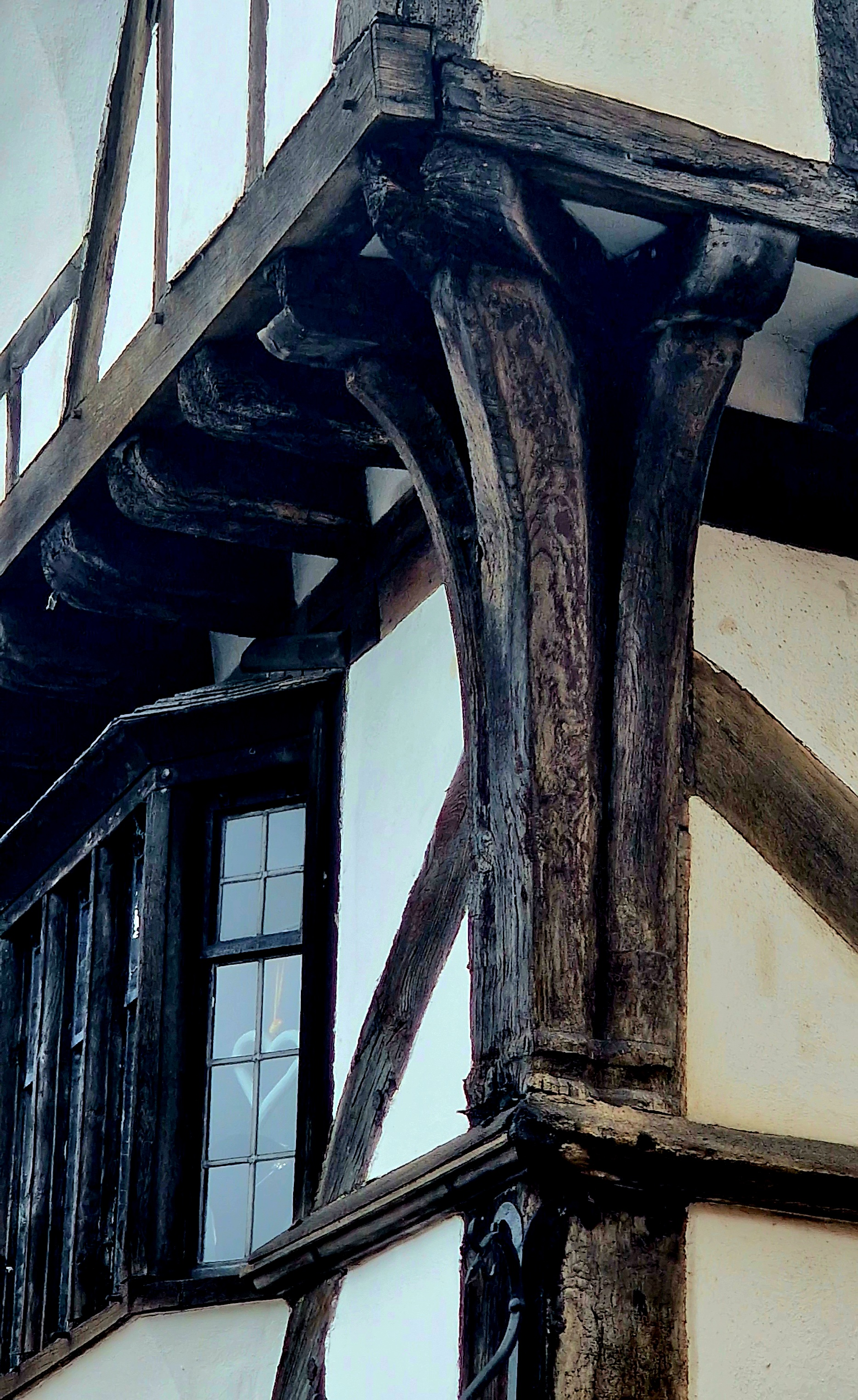
Detail of diagonal dragon beam with curved vertical timbers supporting the first floor corner

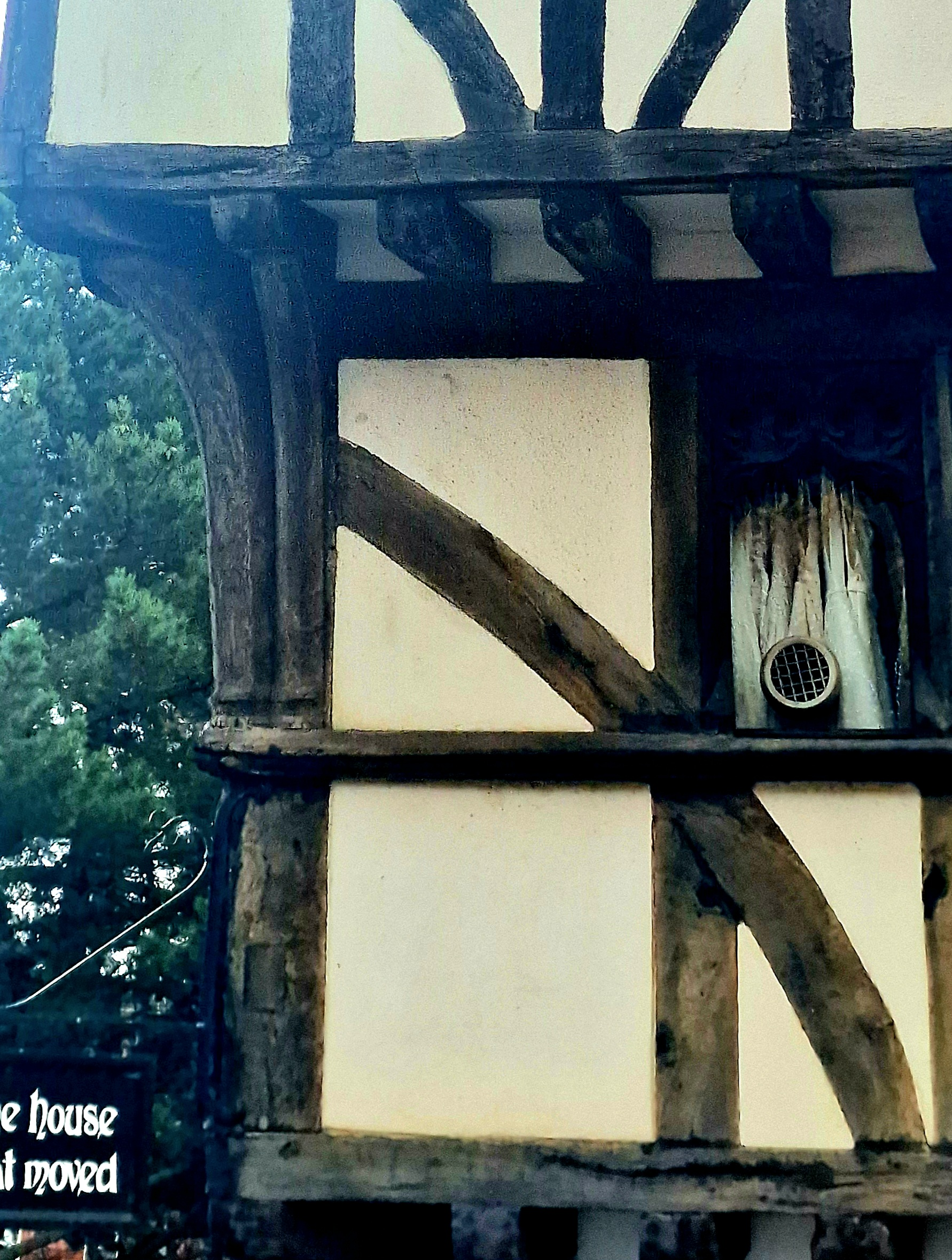
Detail of curved timber supporting the corner of the house

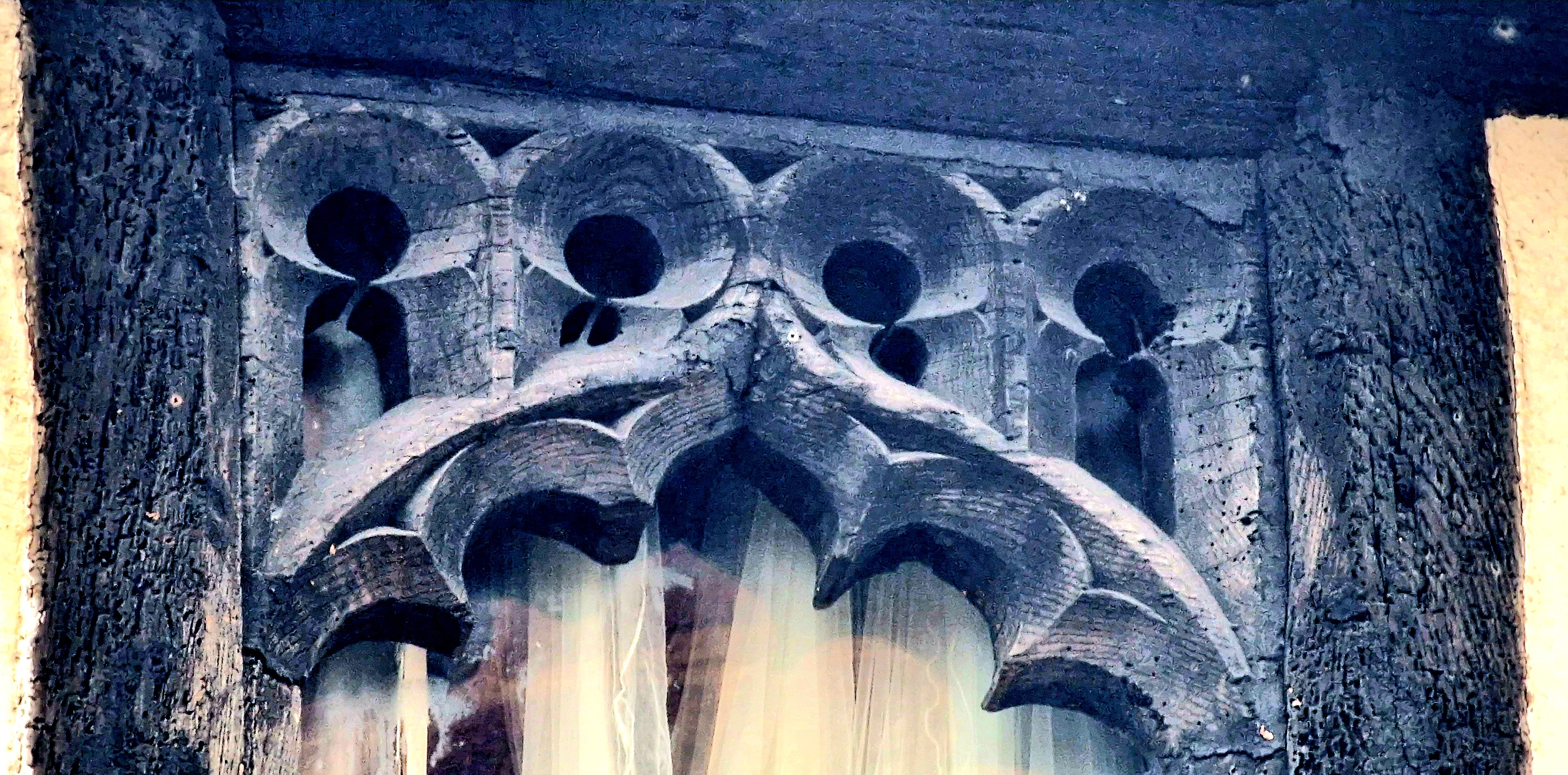
Tracery windows on the second floor featuring a multifoil arch

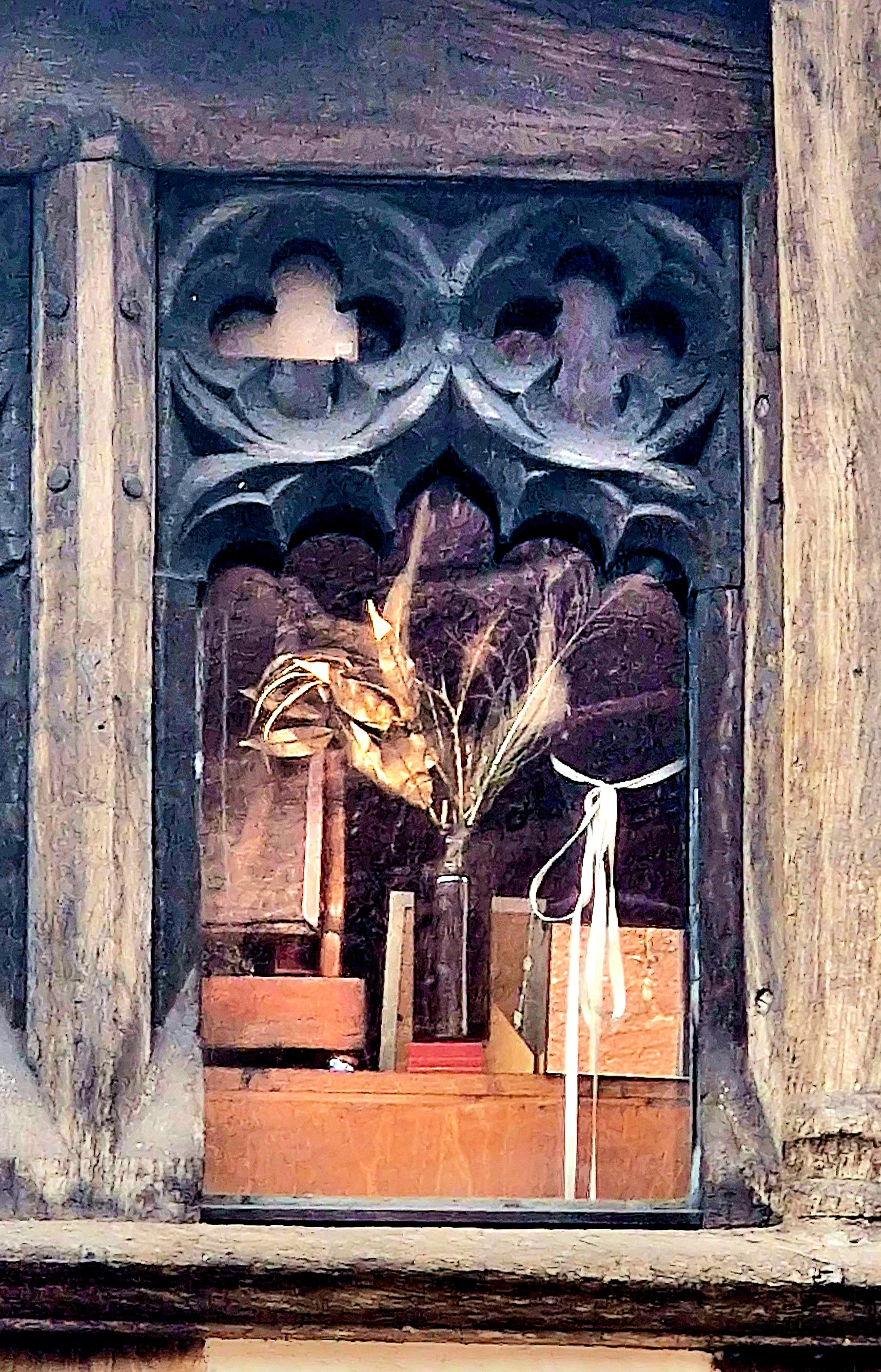
First floor window with carved quatrefoils

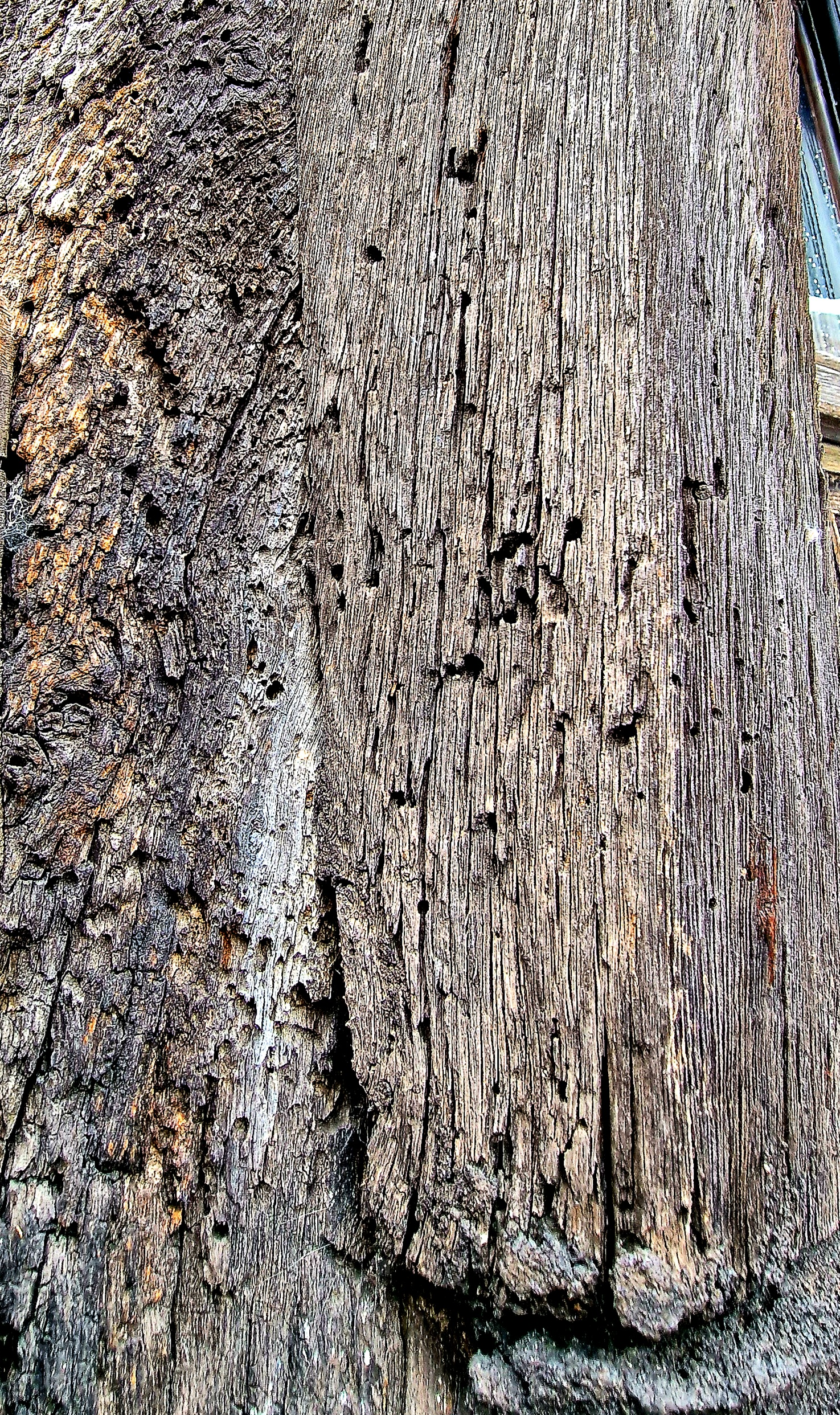
Close up of the original timbers, showing weathering and woodworm holes

== Planned demolition ==
In the 1950s, Exeter City Council was planning the replacement of the bridge over the River Exe, and the construction of a bypass road allowing traffic to avoid the city centre when approaching the proposed two new bridges. The whole of Edmund Street and Frog Street were set to be demolished in order to make way for the road construction.

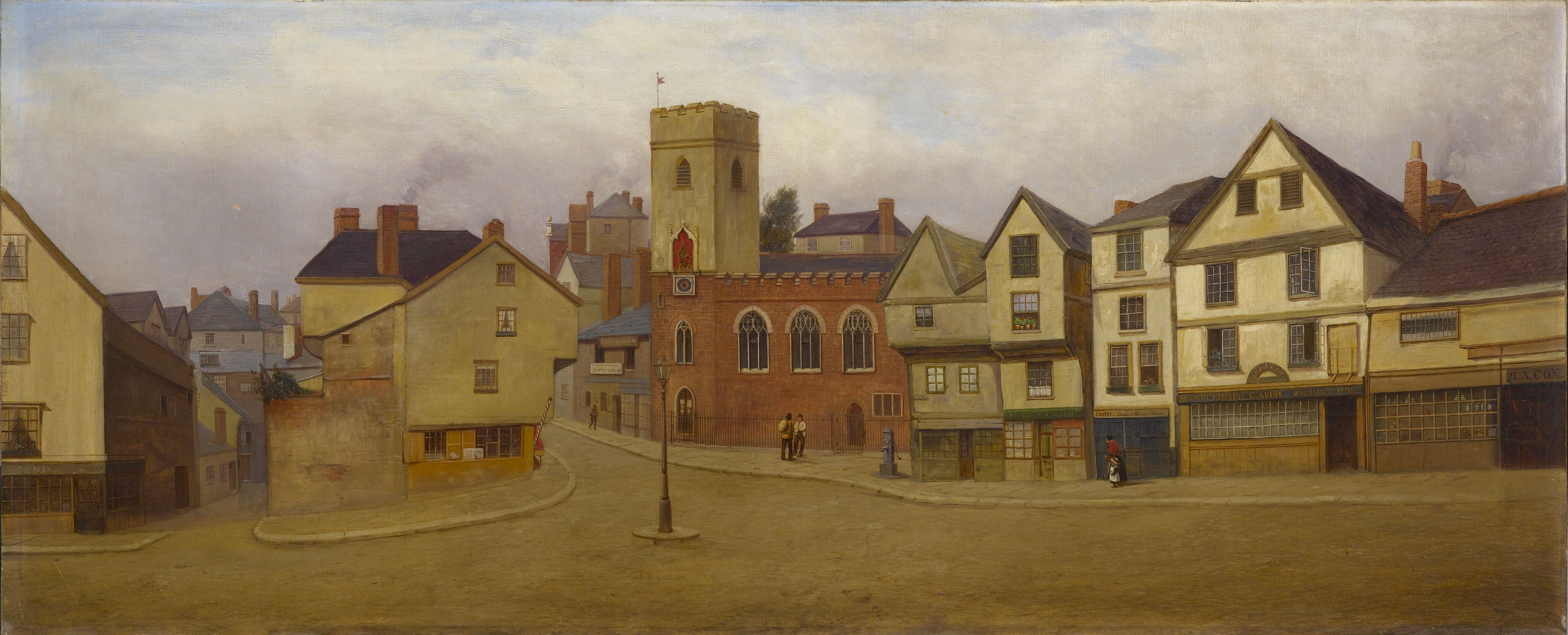
Oil painting showing the current location of the House that Moved in 1886, when the previous late Middle Ages building was still in-situ, prior to demolition in the 1940s

The building was known as the Tudor House (despite likely pre-dating the Tudor period by 60 years or more) or the Merchant House, and by now was in a very poor state of repair, local historians and archaeologists were keen to save the building, following the loss of a number of other historic buildings both during the Baedeker raids of World War II and subsequent post-war redevelopment in the area. Amongst similar buildings demolished was a similar age timber-framed building located on the site to where the house would eventually be moved to in the 1940s. The building was granted Grade II listed status on 29 January 1953.

The city council still wanted to demolish the building, but the Ministry of Works intervened with a preservation order and a plan was put together to relocate the building in order that the road building could go ahead. Exeter City Council was able to get a grant of £7,000 from the government (towards a total cost of over £8,000) to pay for a specialist London contractor to effect the move. In order to facilitate this, a compulsory purchase order was made on the building on 5 October 1960.

== Movement of the building ==
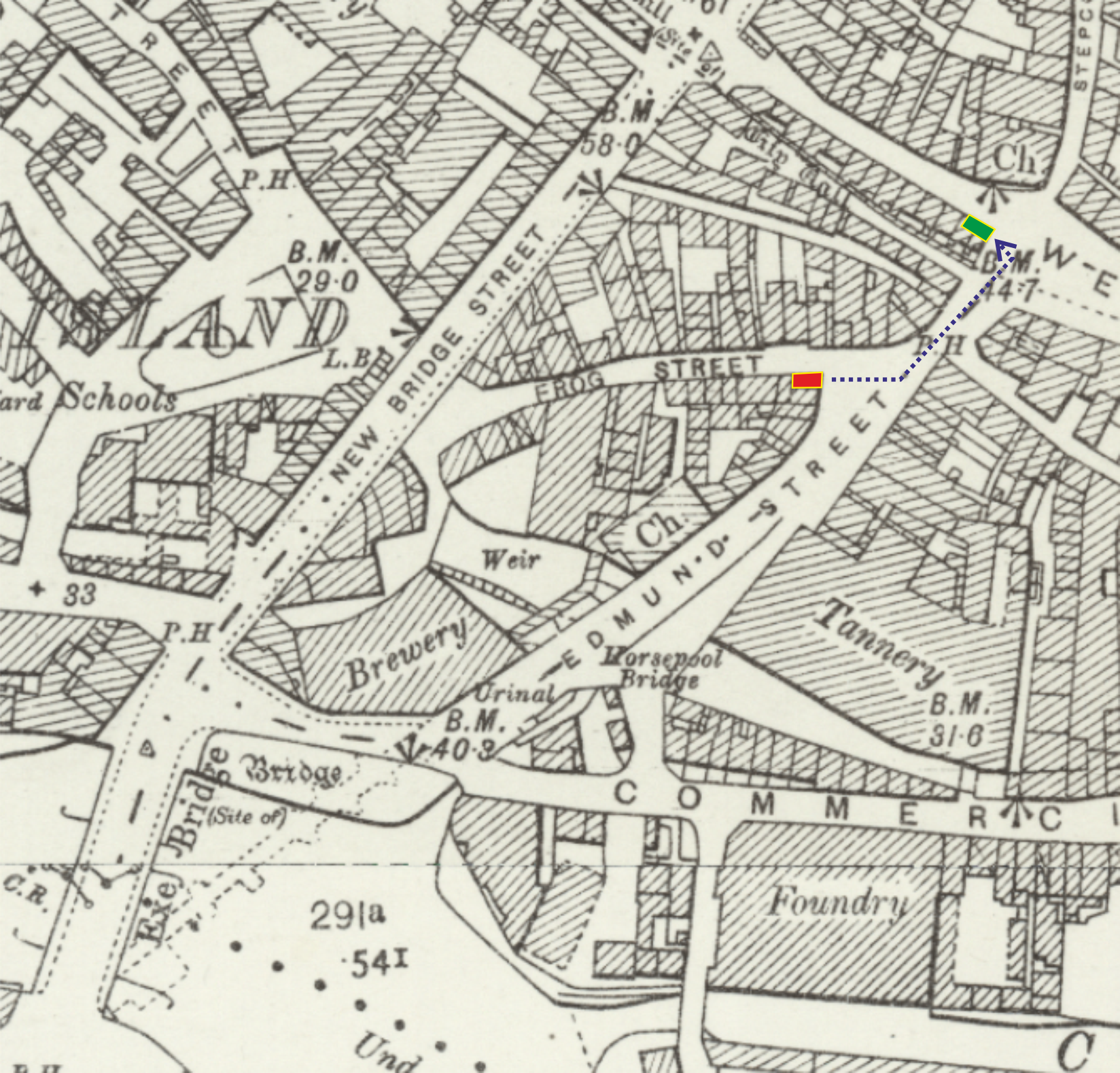
Map of the route of the move, showing the now demolished Edmund Street

The building was in a poor state of repair and in order to move it, it was stripped back to just the wooden frame which still weighed 30 long tons (67,000 lb), which was then reinforced with a timber framework weighing a further 10 long tons (22,000 lb), which avoided using any metal screws or bolts. Iron wheels were attached on the corners, and steel rails laid, and jacks were also added to ensure that the top-heavy house could be kept level during the move. The house was turned through 90 degrees to be in the right orientation for the move.

The move of the building began on Saturday 9 December 1961, with the house being raised on jacks, and over the Sunday and Monday the house was slowly moved into the centre of Edmund Street. On Tuesday 12, Edmund Street was closed to traffic by the police, and the 70 metres (77 yd) move up the 1:10 gradient hill was slowly completed using air-compressor driven winches.

In order to ensure that the house stayed from falling over, spirit levels were used throughout the movement. The work started using two winches, but this ended up being too fast, and one winch was disconnected.

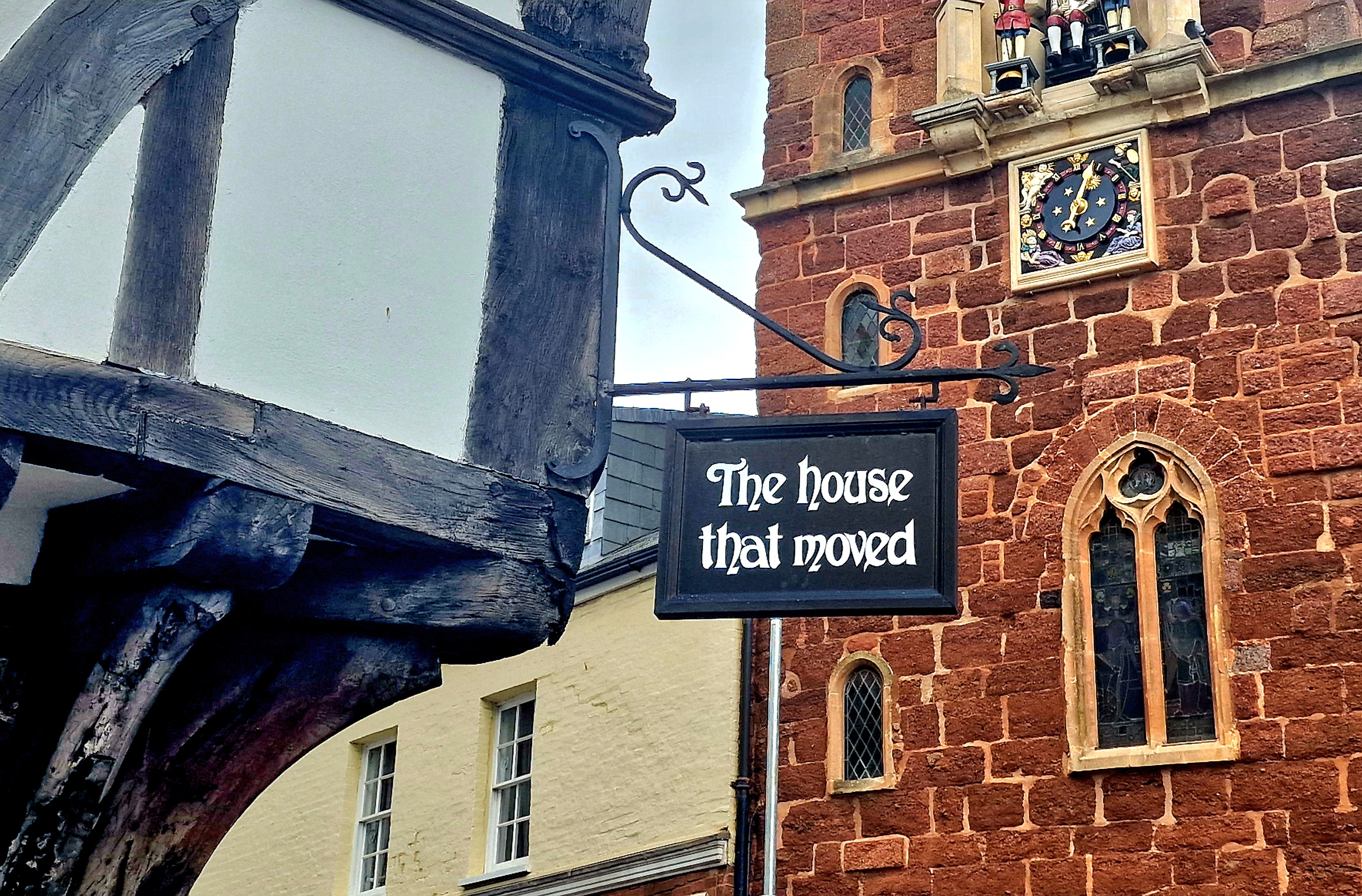
The sign on the house with the Church of St Mary Steps opposite

The house was brought into position at the bottom of West Street, opposite the Church of St Mary Steps, adjacent to the former West Gate of the city walls. The move took about 4.5 hours. Once in place, the house was cemented down, and went through a full refurbishment, including extensive treatment for woodworm.

The move was praised by the National Buildings Record as a "remarkable feat".

The reconstruction following the move did not replace the dormer windows in the cockloft, and also did not replace the later shopfront porch, and indeed moved the front door around the corner to the side which previously faced Frog Street and now faces West Street and the church.

== In popular culture ==
The moving of the house was the setting for a 1978 Puffin Books children's story by David Rees called The House that Moved.
