= Waldbaum's supermarket fire =

1978 disaster in Brooklyn, New York

- Waldbaum's supermarket fire (New York City)
- Date: August 2, 1978
- Time: 08:39 EST (UTC–5)
- Location: 2892 Ocean Avenue, Sheepshead Bay, Brooklyn, New York City, United States; 40°35′27″N 73°57′01″W
- Type: Fire
- Cause: Arson
- Deaths: 6 firefighters

The Waldbaum's supermarket fire was a major fire on August 2, 1978, in Sheepshead Bay, Brooklyn, New York City, United States, that killed six FDNY firefighters. The Waldbaum's store at 2892 Ocean Avenue was undergoing extensive renovations, but was open for customers when the fire broke out.

== Structure ==
The 15,000-square-foot (1,400 m^{2}) building gave the appearance of a one-story building. Inside there was a mezzanine used for offices. The building was constructed with masonry bearing walls and a wood-truss roof. A one-story addition was being built as part of the renovation. The ceiling was a complex construction of several layers, with an interior drop ceiling concealing the original tin ceiling, then a flat roof supported by timber trusses and an exterior rain roof to ensure drainage. Voids between the layers were not obvious to an observer.

== Timeline ==
The first alarm was recorded at 8:39 a.m. Four companies and a battalion chief were dispatched. Engine 254 entered through the front door and began to drag hoses up the stairs to the mezzanine. There was light smoke in the building at this point. Additional firefighters went onto the roof to vent the smoke. At 8:49 a.m., Chief Arthur Clark sent an "all hands" signal. Engine Company 276 arrived and saw flames in the walls of the second-story extension still under construction. The Engine 254 firefighters in the building were attacking the flames in the mezzanine ceiling. They reported much heat but little smoke. Ladder Company 169 arrived with specialized equipment to help open the rain roof.

Deputy Chief James O'Malley (12th Division) arrived at 9:00 a.m. He sent a second alarm moments later. Shortly thereafter Ladder Companies 169, 153, and 156 were on the roof. They cut through the bowed rain roof near the center of the building, but found little smoke. They did not realize the fire was burning under the main roof. They began to make cuts nearer the edges of the building and found these vents freed a great deal of smoke. Teams inside were pulling at the drop ceiling to gain access as the rooftop firefighters began to pump water to douse the flames they could see.

At 9:16 a.m., Chief Clark heard a loud noise and saw considerable fire inside the building for the first time. A wooden roof strut had collapsed. There were 24 men on the roof. Outside, observers reported the roof collapsed without a sound. The structure took a dozen men with it. Six of these men fell onto the tin ceiling and managed to escape into the store. All of these survived, but some with serious injuries.

There was much more smoke both inside and outside the building at this point. A third alarm was turned in. Men still on the roof rushed to the edges of the building. Battalion Chief Peter Eisemann grabbed a line and fought the flames as his men fled to safety. Firefighters inside the store were now searching for survivors from the roof, but conditions became so dangerous that Chief O'Malley ordered them to evacuate. A few moments later, the entire roof fell in. The units conducted an emergency roll call to account for everyone. Search teams reentered the building. They found two dead firefighters on the floor and four more still trapped in the roof.

The fire was declared under control at 12:45 p.m., four hours after the first alarm.

== Arson ==
Experts reported the fire had been set in the gaps between the ceiling using newspapers and a liquid accelerant. Police arrested a man named Eric Jackson for arson. He confessed that he and two others had set the fire at about 6:00 that morning. He claimed he had been paid $500 to do so.

Under this scenario, the fire smoldered undetected for more than two hours before the first alarm.

Jackson was convicted and sentenced to twenty years in confinement. In 1988, he was released when it was discovered that the government had withheld information necessary for his defense. After many legal delays, the government attempted to retry him in the summer of 1994. Jackson was acquitted on all counts.

== See also ==
- Waldbaum's
