= Walter Gervais =

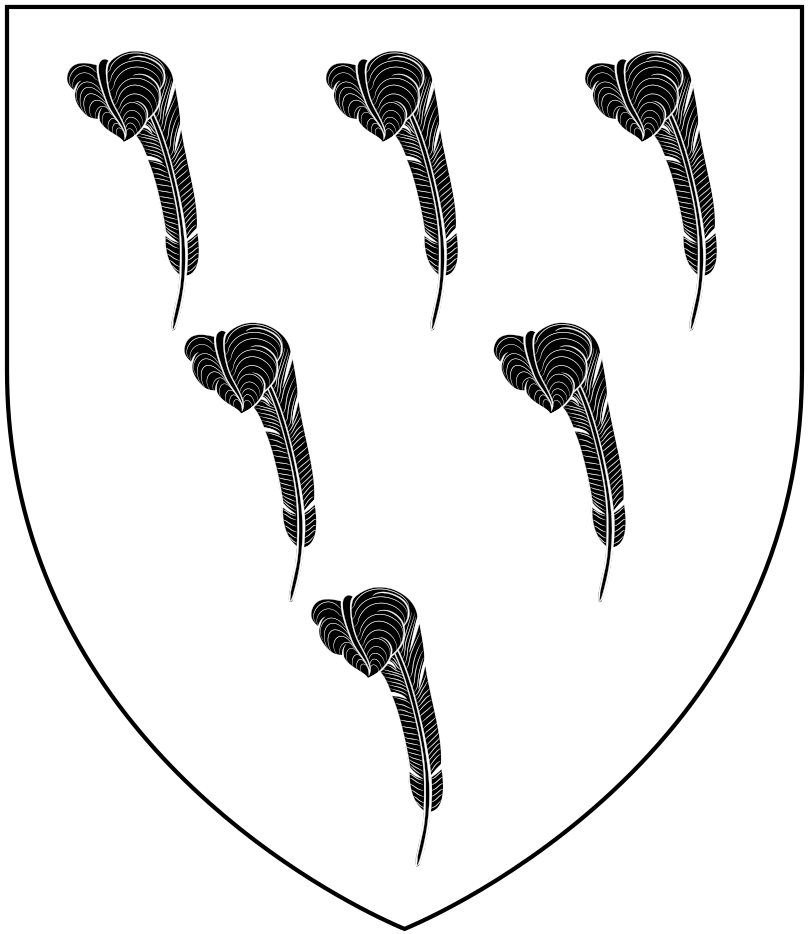
Arms given by Pole, left: Quarterly argent and gules, a bordure vert bezantée ("Gervais of Exeter"); right: Argent, six ostrich feathers sable, three, two and one ("Gervays of Exeter")

Walter Gervais (fl. 1218) of the City of Exeter in Devon, England, was a wealthy merchant who served several times as Mayor of Exeter and who founded the Old Exe Bridge on the west side of the City crossing the River Exe. He is one of Prince's Worthies of Devon.

== Career ==
Walter served several times as Mayor of Exeter and was buried together with his wife in St Edmund's Church on the Exe Bridge.

=== Founds Exe Bridge ===
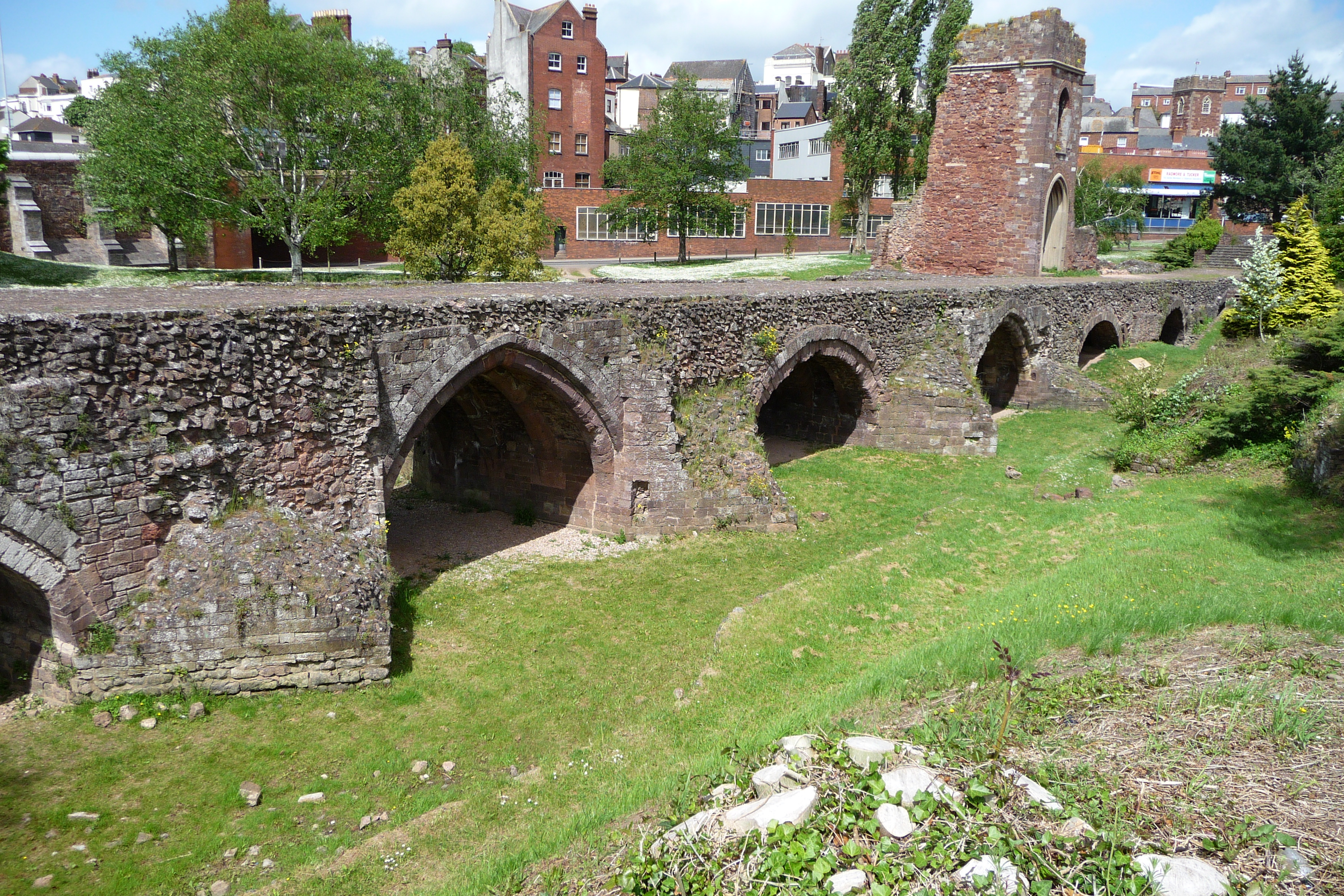
Remains of the Exe Bridge and the Church of St Edmund built on it, burial place of Walter Gervais. The Bridge comprised 17 or 18 arches and spanned 180m between the abutments

One of the earliest historians to comment on the Exe Bridge was Richard Izacke (c.1624–1698), who in his 1677 work Antiquities of the City of Exeter wrote as follows:

1250: Walter Gervis, a worthy citizen hereof founded Exbridge and collected (say some) £3,000 towards the building it, wherewith he purchased much land and bequeathed also his own for the maintenance of the same (ferry being here formerly kept) on which bridge a church was built (wherein this Gervis was now interred) dedicated to St Edmond, King of the East Angles.

Surviving documentary evidence shows that the bridge was in fact built between 1190 and 1210, and that the date of 1250 given by Izacke (and followed by Prince) is too late.

=== Builds St Loye's Chapel ===
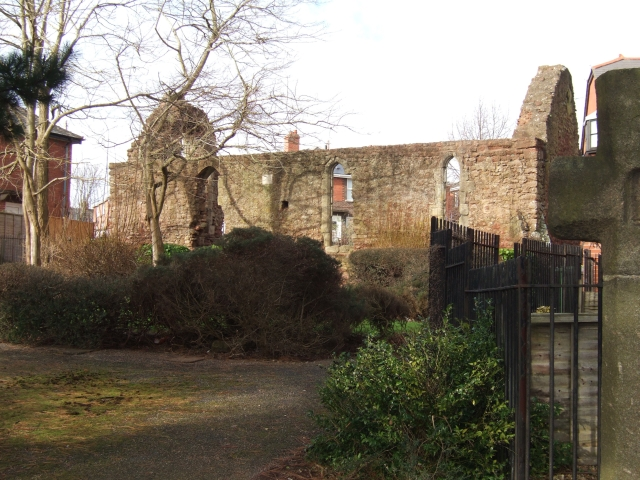
Ruins of St Loye's Chapel

According to the Devon historian Ethel Lega-Weekes (d.1949), it was Walter Gervais, founder of the Exe Bridge, who in about 1238 built a chapel dedicated to St Loye (St Elegius) in the manor of East Wonford, outside the eastern walls of the City of Exeter, probably as his domestic chapel. The ruined walls of the Chapel survive today. East Wonford was later held by the Speke family, when it became known as "Wonford Speke".

== Marriage and children ==
He married and left children including:

- Nicholas Gervais, son and heir, who at the start of the reign of King Henry III (1216–1272) was granted by Robert de Maundevill the estate of Ringswell in the parish of Heavitree, (the place of executions) outside the eastern city walls of Exeter, "on the north side of the way where the gallowes stands". He was the father of:
  - Sir Walter Gervais, last in the male line, whose daughter and heiress Alice Gervais married Sir William Speke of Heywood in the parish of Wembworthy in Devon. Her descendant was Sir John Speke (1442–1518) of Heywood and of Bramford Speke both in Devon, and of Whitelackington in Somerset, Sheriff of Devon in 1517 and a Member of Parliament whose monument is the Speke Chantry in Exeter Cathedral in which survives his recumbent effigy. With Alice's consent Sir William Speke granted Ringswell it to Sir John Wiger.

== Gervais family ==
The Gervais family included the following, of unknown relationship to Walter Gervais:

- William Gervas of Ropley mentioned in Winchester College documents in 1256. The Gervais family (also written as Gervais, Gervas, Gervase, Gerveis and Jervays) were incredibly notable in Ropley, first mentioned in the 1200s, although their presence likely went back earlier, owned almost all of Ropley until they gifted some of these lands to William of Wykeham for the founding of Winchester College in the 1370s. The last mention is in 1450 speaking about rentals of the Land of Roger Gervays which is no surprise seeing they had given most of their lands to Winchester College earlier that century.
- Thomas Gervais, a Citizen of Exeter, who in the late 13th. century purchased the manors of Houndtor and Little Maneton from Thomas Langdon (grandson of Thomas Langdon (fl.1231)) and his grandmother Mabil. Both were subsequently sold by William Gervais, son of Thomas Gervais, to Walter Dymock of Lincolnshire (possibly a member of the prominent Dymock family of Scrivelsby), who was involved in tin mining in Devon.
- Nicholas Gervais, who in 1301 held the manor of Milford from William Speke, son of William Speke. In 1325 Milford was held by Thomas Gervais. A certain Thomas Gervais was Mayor of Exeter in 1337.
