= Crawl space =

Enclosed space below a structure that is too low to stand in

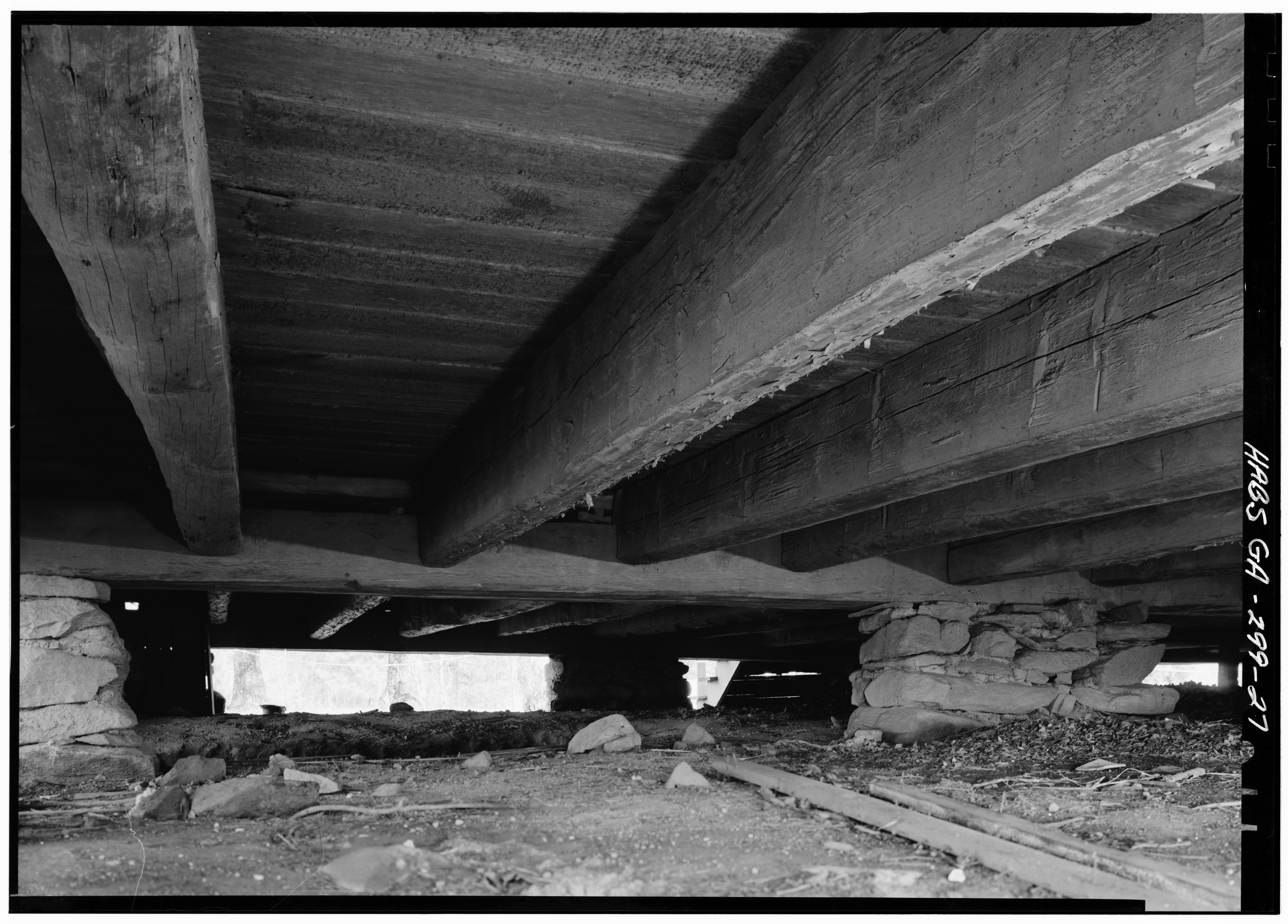
Crawl space

A crawl space or crawlspace is an unoccupied, unfinished, narrow space within a building, between the ground and the first (or ground) floor. The crawl space is so named because there is typically only enough room to crawl rather than stand; anything larger than about 1 to 1.5 metres (3 ft 3 in to 4 ft 11 in) and beneath the ground floor would tend to be considered a basement.

== Uses ==
In the United States, a crawl space is often built when building a basement would be impractical, or too expensive. A crawl space can also substitute for a concrete slab foundation that would hinder building inspections.

The crawl space's functions include providing access to repair plumbing, electrical wiring, and heating and cooling systems without the need for excavation. Building insulation can also be installed in a crawl space. The crawl space can provide a protective buffer between the damp ground and the wooden parts of a home and, with adequate sealing, help with radon mitigation. Crawl spaces are also sometimes used for storage of items such as canned goods that are not particularly susceptible to destruction by mildew or unstable temperatures.

A crawl space foundation can be used to elevate the lowest floors of residential buildings located in Special Flood Hazard Areas above the Base Flood Elevation. The Federal Emergency Management Agency recommends that the floor of the crawl space be at or above the lowest grade adjacent to the building.

=== Disadvantages ===
Crawl spaces are not usually an option in cold regions, such as the northern United States, where a full basement is needed to get the foundation below the frost line. Another downside of crawl spaces compared to basements is that they offer less protection against earthquakes, tornadoes, and hurricanes. Crawl spaces also tend to be more expensive than slab foundations. Problems with crawl spaces, such as leaks, moisture, potential wood damage, and foundation issues may not be noticed as quickly as problems with basements, since people typically do not go into their crawl space as often. A crawl space also may not be as well-suited to a sloped lot as a basement. HVAC equipment in unconditioned crawl spaces tends not to operate as efficiently as it would in a conditioned space such as a basement.

== Designs ==
Crawl spaces can be actively or passively vented, or closed. An advantage of a vented crawl space is that harmful gases such as radon or carbon monoxide (e.g. from gas furnaces or water heaters) can escape or be diluted before they can enter the living space. However, in regions with a humid climate, vents to the outside can also allow moist air to come in, which can then condense if temperatures (e.g. on cooler surfaces such as ductwork) drop below the dew point, creating a damp environment that is hospitable to indoor mold growth as well as infestations by rodents and insects, possibly including wood-damaging ones such as termites or carpenter ants. Even without condensation, relative humidity above 80% can support mold growth and rot wooden structural materials such as floor joists. Humidity in some sealed crawl spaces is controlled using a dehumidifier.

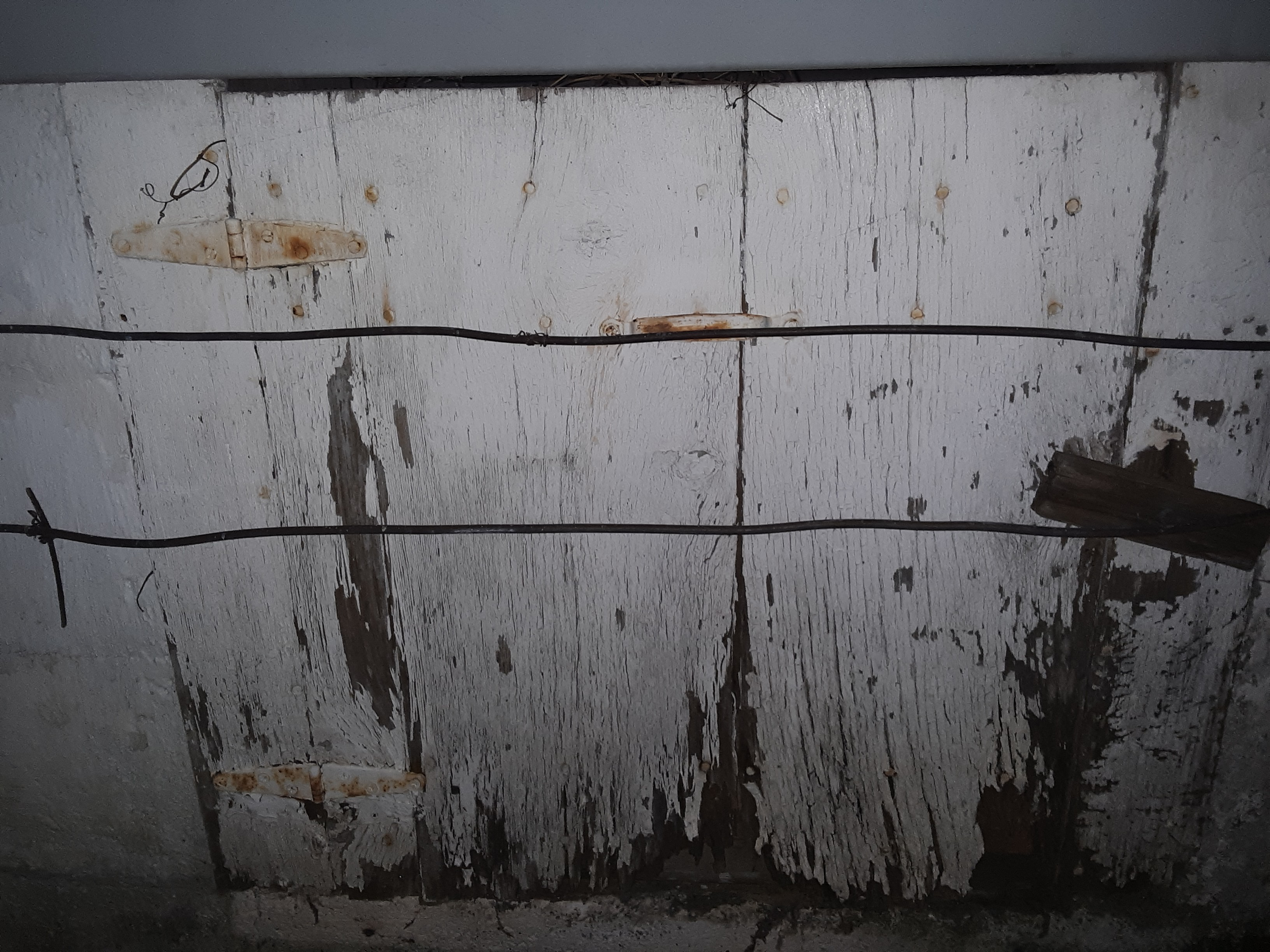
A wooden crawl space access panel, opening to the exterior of the house, that has begun rotting away from dampness

Encapsulation is sometimes used to prevent the passage of air from the crawl space to the living environment, to save energy and improve indoor air quality, since air in the crawl space might otherwise tend to rise due to the stack effect. Encapsulation involves adding a vapor barrier to the floor, sealing off all openings to the outdoors, adding thermal insulation to the walls, and sealing off any remaining gaps and cracks (such as plumbing and wiring penetrations) between the crawl space and the floor of the home. A 2005 U.S. Department of Energy study of homes in the southeastern United States found that closed crawl spaces with sealed foundation wall vents, sealed polyethylene film liners and various insulation and drying strategies had significantly reduced space conditioning energy use compared to traditional wall-vented crawl spaces with perimeter wall vents and unsealed polyethylene film covering the ground surface. As a further encapsulation measure, crawl space access doors are sometimes located inside the home, or an airtight, insulated access door is built in the perimeter wall.

A crawl space can be susceptible to flooding, a risk that is sometimes mitigated by such measures as using rain drainage such as rain gutters to conduct rainwater away from the house and sloping the earth away from the house.

Crawl space wall materials may include, e.g., solid concrete or concrete masonry units.

== See also ==
- Cockloft, sometimes mistakenly called a "crawl space"
