= Church of St Mary Steps, Exeter =

Church in Devon, England

St Mary Steps, Exeter
- Parish Church of St Mary Steps
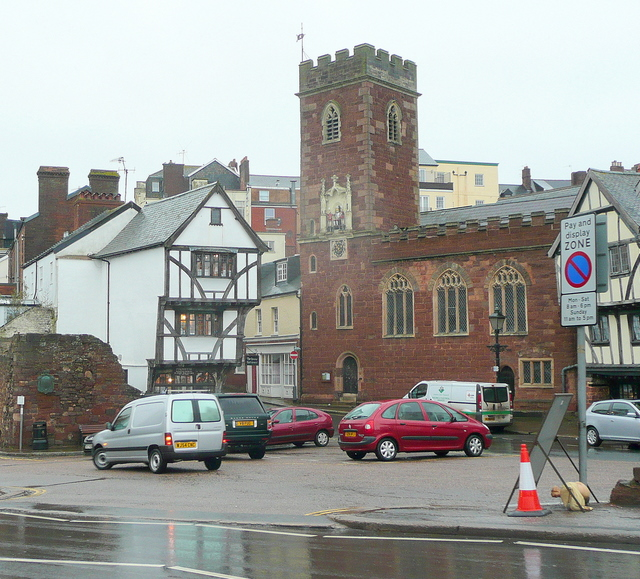
- Church Front

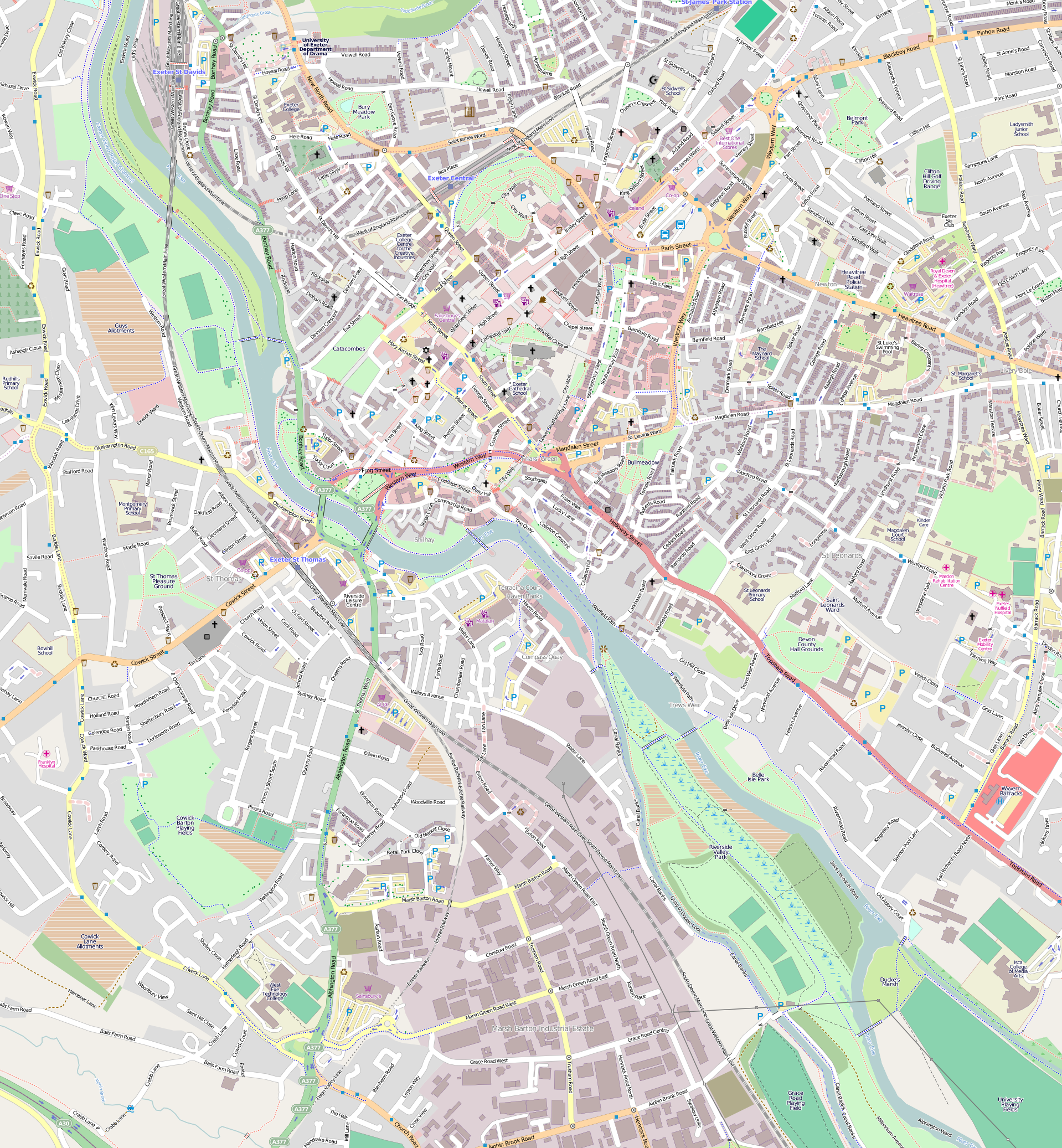
- Shown in Exeter
- 50°43′12″N 3°32′05″W
- OS grid reference: SX 91760 92267
- Location: Exeter
- Country: England
- Denomination: Church of England
- Previous denomination: Roman Catholic
- Website: heavitreeparish.co.uk/st-mary-steps/

Architecture
- Heritage designation: Grade I Listed
- Designated: 29 January 1953
- Years built: about 1150; 876 years ago

Administration
- Province: Canterbury
- Diocese: Exeter
- Archdeaconry: Exeter
- Deanery: Christianity
- Benefice: Heavitree and St Mary Steps
- Parish: St Mary Steps, Exeter

The Church of St Mary Steps is a Grade I Listed church in the city of Exeter, Devon, England.

== History ==
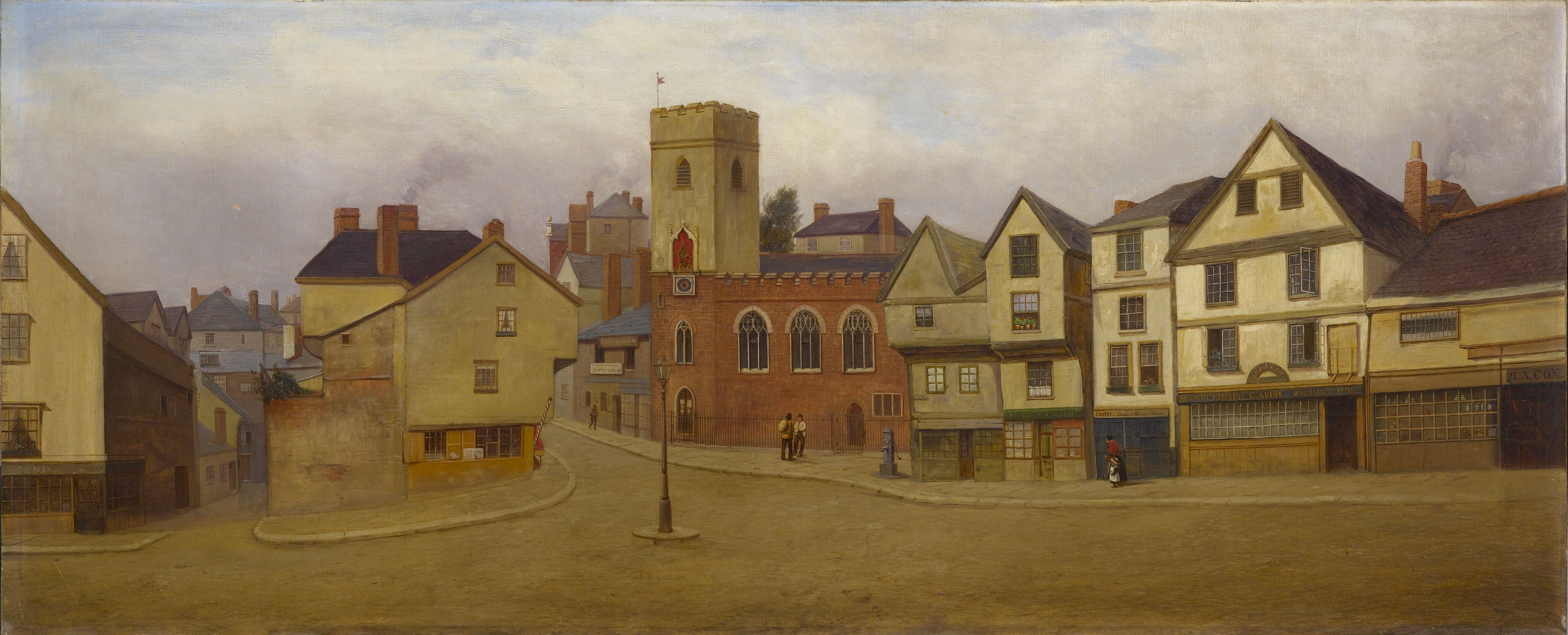
Oil on canvas townscape ‘The Church of St Mary Steps, Exeter’, c.1886. The painting depicts the church with old residential town buildings surrounding it. The church is one of the oldest in Exeter, dating back to the medieval period.

The church dates from about 1150 and was rebuilt in the 15th century. It was formerly by the west gate of the city.

In the late 19th century the church was restored by the architect Edward Ashworth.

In 1961, The House That Moved was moved from its former location to opposite the church.

== Benefice of Heavitree and St Mary Steps ==
Parishes within the benefice:

- Heavitree (St Michael and All Angels) with St Lawrence and St Paul
- St Mary Steps

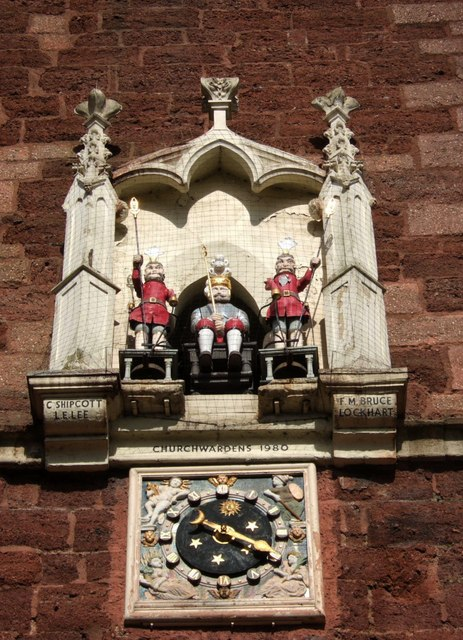
The clock (also seen above, painted red)
