= Rain roof =

Roof constructed over an existing roof

A rain roof is a second, newer roof that has been constructed over an existing roof that has failed, or which has inadequate slope to shed rain. Since such additional spaces may not be visible or accessible, the concealed void presents a particular hazard in firefighting operations, as a fire may develop or persist in such a space undetected.

== Description ==
Rain roofs are commonly found in North America over an older flat or minimally sloped roof that has developed leaks, or in a building that has been added to in a manner that requires revised drainage patterns. Construction usually involves framing or trusses that create a space above the original roof, which remains in place, which are then covered with new roofing materials. Side and end walls may be extended upwards to create sufficient space for the framing and to enclose the new space.

While rain roofs are commonly found in large, older commercial buildings, they may also be built over single and double-wide mobile homes to improve drainage.

== Fire safety ==
Firefighting operations can be complicated by the presence of the undetected concealed space, and by the presence of a second water-shedding roof underneath. A concealed space, potentially unknown to firefighters and difficult or impossible to access, may allow a fire to grow or persist in spite of firefighting operations inside and outside the building.

A rain roof was a significant hazard that contributed to the deaths of six New York City Fire Department firefighters in the 1978 Waldbaum's supermarket fire.

== See also ==
- Cockloft, a shallow, concealed space between a roof and a ceiling
