= Cockloft =

Inaccessible space above a ceiling

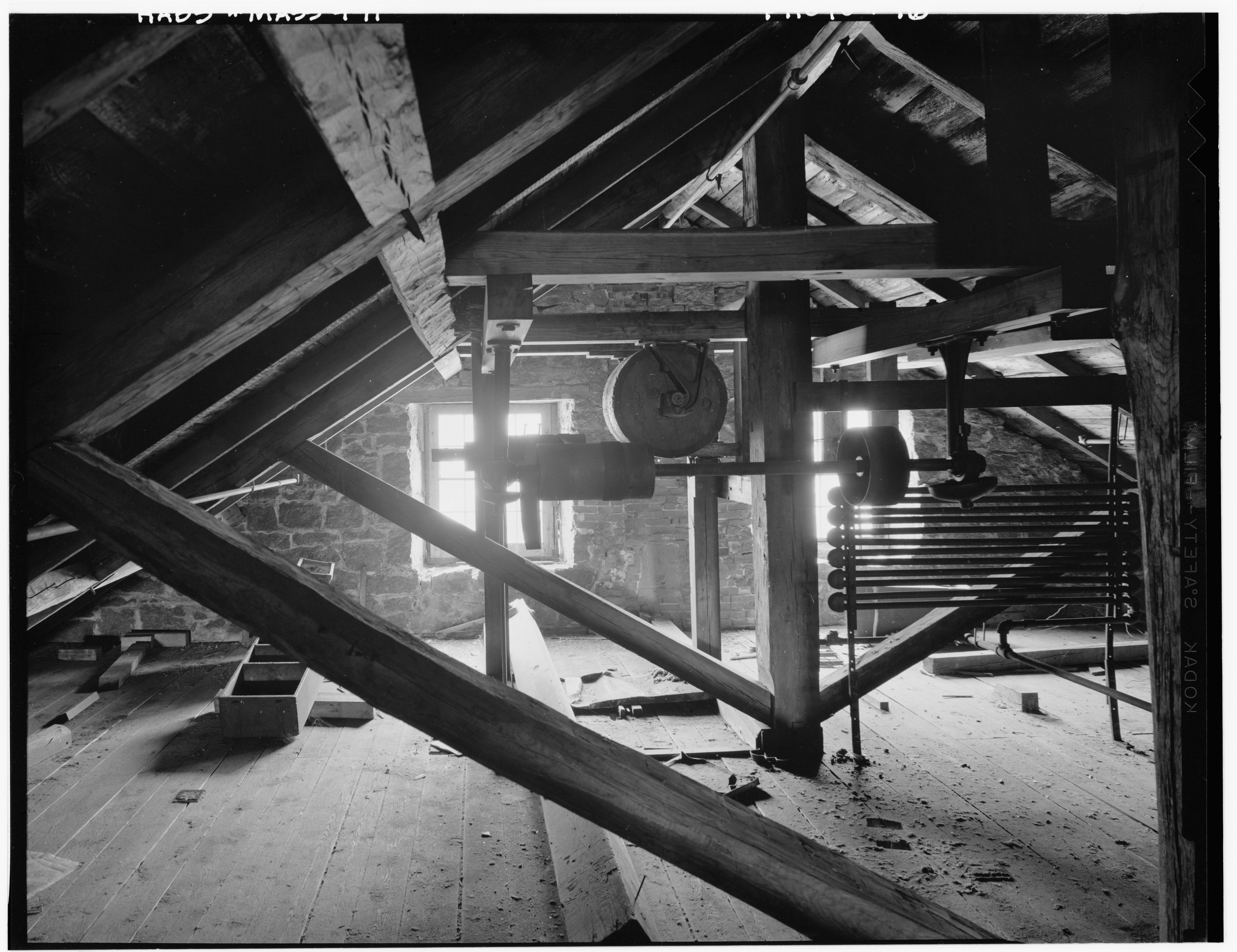
North Uxbridge, Massachusetts cockloft

A cockloft is a horizontal void between a building's uppermost ceiling and its roof, with no habitable or accessible space. It is typically of combustible construction, with limited or no access. A cockloft may create a large space over multiple occupancies or adjoining buildings. Cocklofts are commonly present in North America in older commercial buildings and rowhouses, with the roof above sloping from front to back, creating shallow attic-like spaces.

Cocklofts have particular significance in firefighting, since they are difficult to access, are unlighted, require stooping or crawling, with no walkable floors, and are typically constructed with exposed lumber. Fire may remain active and undetected in such spaces and may flash over when oxygen is introduced by ventilation.

== See also ==
- Crawl space – Enclosed space below a structure that is too low to stand in
- Rain roof – Roof constructed over an existing roof
