= List of places in Exeter =

This is a list of the suburbs, wards and landmarks located within the city of Exeter, England.

== Suburbs ==
- Alphington
- Beacon Heath – a housing estate near Pinhoe
- Clyst Heath
- Countess Wear
- Cowick
- Digby
- Duryard
- Exe Island
- Exwick
- Foxhayes
- Friar's Green
- Haven Banks
- Heavitree
- Livery Dole
- Lower Wear
- Marsh Barton
- Matford
- Middle Moor
- Monkerton
- Newcourt
- Newtown
- Pennsylvania
- Pinhoe
- Polsloe
- Redhills
- Sowton
- St David's
- St James
- St Leonard's
- St Sidwell's
- St Thomas
- Stoke Hill
- Topsham
- Whipton – a suburban area east of Polsloe Bridge station and north of Heavitree
- Whipton Barton
- Wonford

== Wards ==
Ward boundaries since 2016

The city is subdivided into thirteen wards, for electoral and other purposes relating to Exeter City Council. Since boundary changes came into effect in 2016, the following is the list of current wards:

- Alphington – includes the Marsh Barton industrial estate
- Duryard & St James
- Exwick
- Heavitree
- Mincinglake & Whipton
- Newtown & St Leonards
- Pennsylvania
- Pinhoe
- Priory
- St David's
- St Loyes
- St Thomas
- Topsham – includes Newcourt and the east half of Countess Wear

== Built environment ==
=== Extant ===
- Bishop's Palace
- Bowhill House
- Cathedral Close
- Custom House
- Exeter Guildhall
- Exeter Quayside
- Exeter Ship Canal
- Exeter War Memorial
- HM Prison Exeter
- Met Office
- Northernhay Gardens
- Old Exe Bridge
- Parliament Street
- Royal Albert Memorial Museum
- Rougemont Castle
- Rougemont Gardens

=== Historic ===
- Exeter Power Station
- Livery Dole
- Theatre Royal, Exeter
- Whipton Barton

== Natural environment ==
- Exeter Valley Parks
- Ludwell Valley Park
- River Exe

== Sports grounds ==
- Exeter Arena
- Exeter Golf and Country Club
- Sandy Park (Exeter Chiefs, rugby union)
- St James Park (Exeter City FC, association football)

== Places of worship ==
- Exeter Cathedral
- Exeter Synagogue
- George's Chapel
- St David's Church
- St Martin's Church, Exeter
- St Mary Arches Church
- St Michael and All Angels, Dinham Mount
- St Michael and All Angels' Church (Heavitree)
- St Nicholas Priory
- St Olave's Church
- St Pancras Church
- St Petrocks Church
- St Stephens Church

== Hospitals ==
=== Current hospitals ===
- Heavitree hospital (formerly Exeter City Hospital)
- Royal Devon and Exeter Hospital
- Whipton Hospital
- Wonford House Hospital

=== Former hospitals ===
- Digby Hospital
- Exminster Hospital
- Heavitree isolation hospital
- Honeylands
- West of England Eye Infirmary
