= Pennsylvania (disambiguation) =

Pennsylvania is a state in the United States.

Pennsylvania may also refer to:

== Places ==
- Province of Pennsylvania, before independence in 1776
- Pennsylvania Avenue, in Washington, D.C. where the White House is located
- Pennsylvania Avenue (disambiguation)
- Pennsylvania, Exeter, a suburb of Exeter, Devon, England
- Pennsylvania, Gloucestershire, a village in England
- University of Pennsylvania, an Ivy League university located in Philadelphia, Pennsylvania

== Land transport ==
- Pennsylvania Railroad, United States, 1846–1968
  - Pennsylvania Station (disambiguation), any of several Pennsylvania Railroad terminals
- 6-4-4-6, a wheel arrangement for duplex steam locomotives in the Whyte notation, was nicknamed "Pennsylvania"

== Ships ==
- SS Pennsylvania, a name carried by several merchant and passenger ships
- USS Pennsylvania, ships of the United States Navy which have borne the name
- Pennsylvania (steamboat), a Mississippi steamboat that exploded and sank on June 13, 1858

== Music ==
- Pennsylvania (album) (1998), by Pere Ubu
- "Pennsylvania" (song), the official state song
- "Pennsylvania", a song by the Bloodhound Gang from the 2005 album Hefty Fine
- "Pennsylvania", a song by Jars of Clay from the 2013 album Inland
- "Pennsylvania", a song by John Linnell from the album State Songs, 1999

== Other ==
- The Pennsylvania, a historic apartment building in Indianapolis, Indiana, U.S.
- Pennsylvania Grade Crude Oil, a type of crude oil first discovered in Pennsylvania

== See also ==
- "Pennsylvania 6-5000" (song), a 1940 swing jazz and pop standard
- Pennsylvanian (disambiguation)
