= Royal Devon and Exeter Hospital =

- Royal Devon University Healthcare NHS Foundation Trust
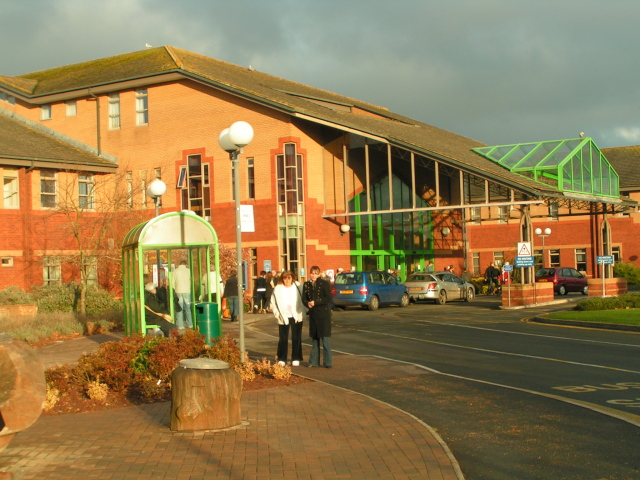
- Royal Devon and Exeter Hospital, Wonford

- Shown in Devon

Geography
- Location: Exeter, Devon, England, United Kingdom
- Coordinates: 50.7168°N 3.5064°W

Organisation
- Care system: Public NHS
- Type: Teaching
- Affiliated university: University of Exeter and Plymouth University

Services
- Emergency department: Accident & Emergency
- Beds: 843 inpatient beds and 80 day case beds

History
- Founded: 1743

Links
- Website: www.royaldevon.nhs.uk
- Lists: Hospitals in England

The Royal Devon and Exeter Hospital (commonly referred to as RD&E), and with a main site sometimes known as Wonford Hospital, is a large teaching hospital situated in Exeter, Devon, England, and is run by the Royal Devon University Healthcare NHS Foundation Trust.

The hospital has multiple sites, with the main site at Wonford in the former grounds of the Wonford House Hospital (run separately by the Devon Partnership NHS Trust). The hospital also operates the nearby Heavitree hospital site, which was formerly the Exeter City Hospital, as well as satellite sites including Whipton Hospital.

The hospital is used for the clinical training of medical students from the University of Plymouth and the University of Exeter.

== History ==
=== Southernhay ===
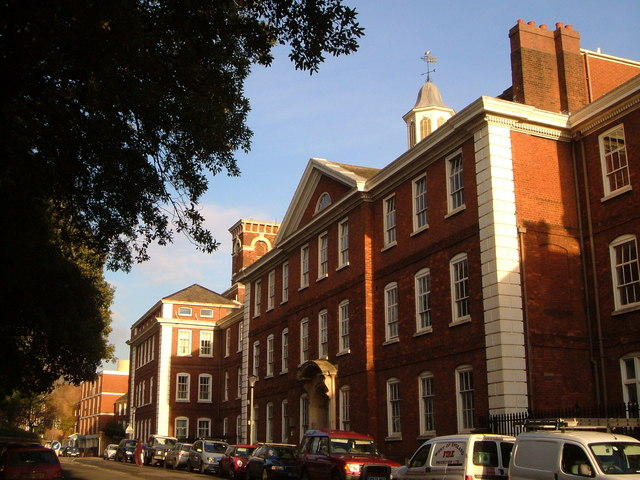
The original site in Southernhay

In the mid-18th century, Alured Clarke, the newly appointed Dean of Exeter who had already helped with the establishment of a cottage hospital in Winchester (which has since become the Royal Hampshire County Hospital), proposed the idea of a new hospital in Exeter to local gentlemen.

The committee selected a site on Southernhay, near the city centre, and the foundation stone was laid by Clarke only 35 days after the initial meeting of the committee, with a party of soldiers firing three volleys of small arms to mark the occasion. Local architect John Richards provided his services for free, and designed a large brick building with a "architecturally domestic" style, a wing on either side, and a minimum of detail. The building was completed and the hospital admitted its first patients in 1743. By 1748, the hospital had one hundred beds.

The new 'Halford wing' was started in 1856, from the bequests of Mrs Halford, and this was used from 1858 to alleviate overcrowding in the hospital. A gothic-style chapel was added to the hospital, opening on 31 August 1869, built with a gift from Mr Arthur Kempe, one of the honorary surgeons of the hospital.

In 1896-7, the 'Victoria wing' was built parallel to the Halford wing, and named for Queen Victoria in recognition of her long reign. Sun balconies were added in 1933. In 1899, the Duke of York, and his wife visited the hospital and granted it permission to use the "Royal" title.

Despite the city being regularly subjected to air raids during the Second World War, the hospital escaped damage. In 1920, the Victory wing was added, bringing the total bed space to over 300.

In 1948, the hospital became part of the newly formed National Health Service.

=== First Wonford hospital ===
In July 1974, having outgrown the Southernhay site, the hospital moved out of the city centre, into a new tower-block hospital built in the grounds of the Wonford House Hospital, formerly an asylum, set in 20 acres of grounds.

The move involved a fleet of ambulances shuttling patients from the Southernhay site to the new building over the course of over a week. The casualty and accident surgical wards were the last to move. The move was over eight weeks behind schedule, due to delays in delivery of vital equipment because of the Three-Day Week imposed by the government due to industrial action by coal miners. There were 14 wards in the new hospital, as well as 12 operating theatres.

Initially, there were complaints from night staff about the noise of gunfire from the nearby Wyvern Barracks, where the army shooting range was located. Two people died falling from height at the hospital within a year of it opening, the first being a workman on the outside of the building, and the second a nine-year old patient, who fell down a service shaft.

In 1985, the building was the first major structure in the UK found to have concrete cancer (the alkali–silica reaction), which caused the concrete to expand and fail. It is thought that condensation from the kitchens was the primary cause.

=== Second Wonford hospital ===
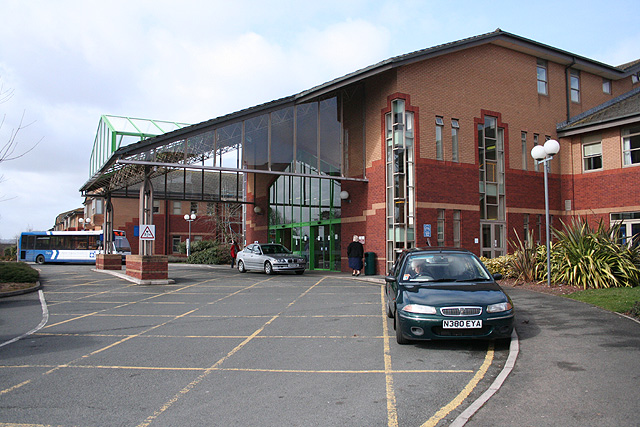
Main entrance of the current Wonford Hospital

The replacement buildings were built over several phases with the first phase being completed in 1992. This first phase included an ophthalmic unit which replaced the West of England Eye Infirmary which was previously on its own site on Magdalen Street in the city centre.

The second phase was completed in 1996, followed by the Peninsula College of Medicine and Dentistry opening in 2004 and a new maternity and gynaecology unit, known as the "centre for women's health", opening at Wonford in 2007, with maternity moving from Heavitree hospital.

== Governance ==
In April 2022, the hospital's Trust, Royal Devon and Exeter NHS Foundation Trust merged with Northern Devon Healthcare NHS Trust to form Royal Devon University Healthcare NHS Foundation Trust.

== Services ==
The hospital is a large hospital, which is set across two sites in Wonford and Heavitree.

== See also ==
- Heavitree Hospital
- Whipton Hospital
- Wonford House Hospital
- List of hospitals in England
