= Spotsylvania =

Spotsylvania may refer to:

- Spotsylvania County, Virginia, United States
  - Spotsylvania County Public Schools, a public school district serving Spotsylvania County
    - Spotsylvania High School
  - Spotsylvania Courthouse, Virginia, the county seat of Spotsylvania County
    - Battle of Spotsylvania Court House, an American Civil War battle
  - Spotsylvania station, Olive, Virginia
  - Spotsylvania Towne Centre, a mall in Fredericksburg, Virginia

== See also ==
- Pennsylvania (disambiguation)
