= Southbank House =

Victorian building in Lambeth

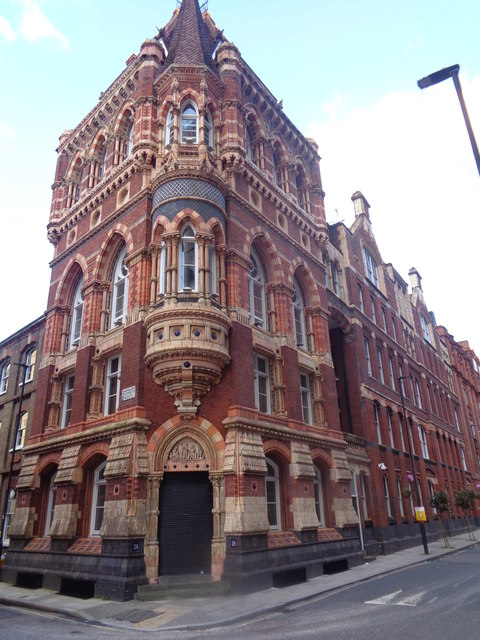
- Interactive map of the Southbank House area

General information
- Type: Office
- Architectural style: Gothic Revival Architecture
- Location: Lambeth, London, England
- Coordinates: 51°29′32″N 0°07′14″W
- Completed: 1878

Listed Building – Grade II
- Official name: Southbank House
- Designated: 11 February 1974
- Reference no.: 1200776

Southbank House is a Grade II listed office building in Lambeth, London. It was completed in 1878 to the design of Robert Stark Wilkinson to house the offices of the Doulton pottery company.

The building is a survivor of the much larger pottery works that stood around the site before closing in 1956. The extant Southbank House formerly serving as the museum and art school. The building is adorned with gothic terracotta detailing such as a tympanum relief of potters. The detailing serves as a sort of public advertisement as Doulton worked in the production of architectural terracotta.

It also served as the headquarters of consulting engineering firm Mouchel (formerly L. G. Mouchel & Partners Ltd) after the company relocated there in 1960.
