= Pennsylvania, Exeter =

Suburb in Devon, England

Pennsylvania
- Suburb
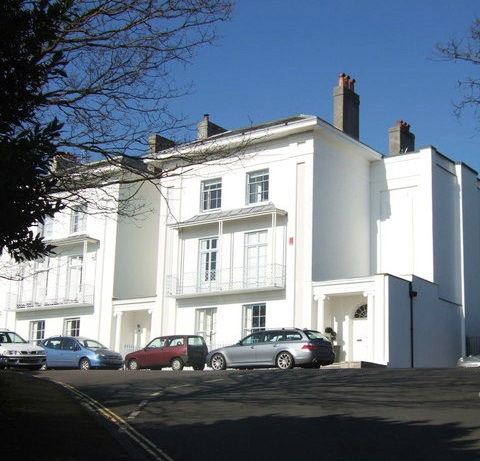
- Pennsylvania Park, Exeter

- Pennsylvania district ward in Exeter

- Location within Devon Location within the United Kingdom
- Coordinates: 50.734°N 3.529°W
- Country: England
- County: Devon
- City: Exeter
- Time zone: UTC+0:00 (GST)

Pennsylvania is a ward and suburb situated on the high ground to the north of the city of Exeter in the county of Devon, England. It lies between the ancient deer park of Duryard and Stoke Hill. It was named after the US state by Joseph Sparkes, a Quaker banker who built the first terrace, Pennsylvania Park, in about 1821. At the 2021 census, the ward had a population of 10,533, which was slightly more than the 10,288 recorded at the 2011 census.

Its southern slopes, nearest to the city, include many spacious late Victorian and Edwardian houses, while on the steep higher hills, heading north out of Exeter, the housing is mainly 1920s–1970s, with a few newer estates on the city's extremities.

Its proximity within walking distance of Exeter University has made it popular with academics and students. J. K. Rowling was a resident of Pennsylvania while a student at Exeter University in the late 1980s.

== See also ==
- Pennsylvania (disambiguation)
