= Robert Stark Wilkinson =

Robert Stark Wilkinson (1843–1936) was a British architect. Born in Exeter, his father was a Town Councillor and Guardian. He studied architecture at the University of Oxford.

== Notable works ==
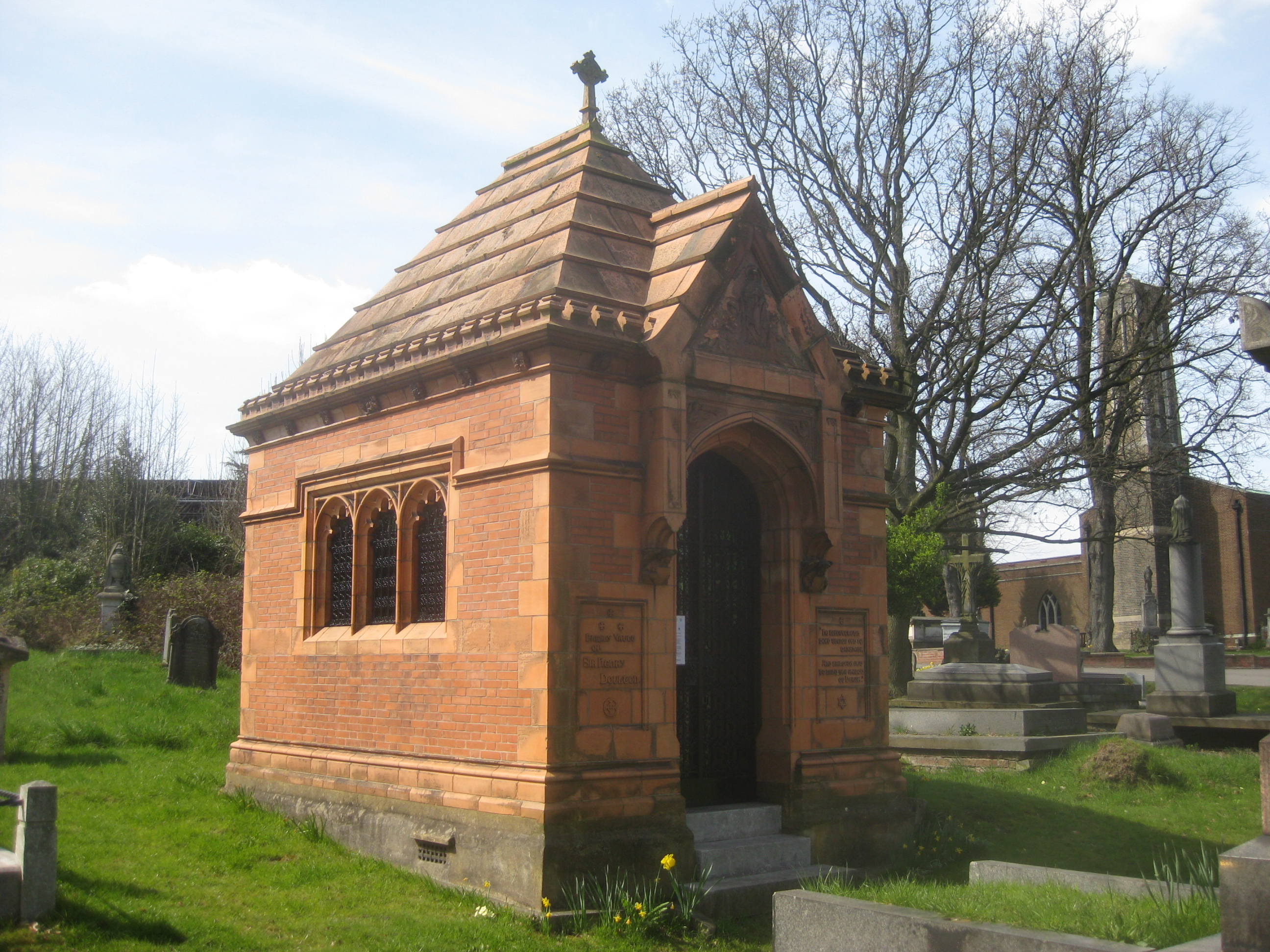
Henry Doulton's mausoleum at West Norwood Cemetery

- Doulton & Co pottery works, North Lambeth, 1879
- Exeter Lunatic Asylum, Digby, 1886
- Henry Doulton mausoleum, West Norwood Cemetery, c.1888
- Saracen's Head Hotel, No 10 Snow Hill, London. (Alterations) 1896–1903.

=== Doulton works ===
Probably his most notable work was the headquarters and factory building of Sir Henry Doulton's pottery works, in North Lambeth. The building was in an extravagant high Gothic style, making extensive use of Doulton pottery tiles and figures for detailing. Only a small portion of the building survives today, as Southbank House. It retains its terracotta tympanum by Doulton's potter George Tinworth over the corner entranceway. The frieze includes figures of Henry Doulton and artists including Tinworth, Hannah Barlow, and her cat Tommy.
