= Tiverton and District Hospital =

- Royal Devon University Healthcare NHS Foundation Trust
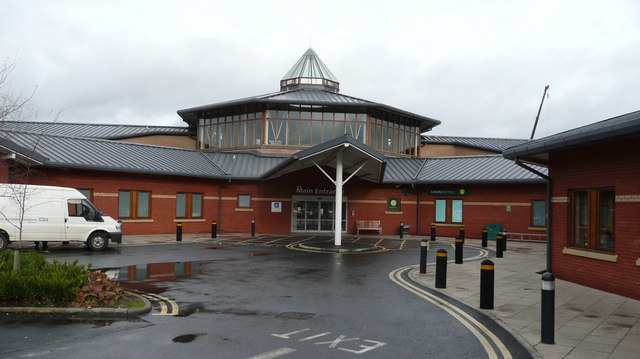
- Tiverton and District Hospital

- Shown in Devon

Geography
- Location: Kennedy Way, Tiverton, Devon, England
- Coordinates: 50.9091°N 3.4932°W

Organisation
- Care system: NHS
- Type: Community

History
- Founded: 1860

Links
- Website: www.rdehospital.nhs.uk/our-sites/tiverton-and-district-hospital/
- Lists: Hospitals in England

Tiverton and District Hospital is a health facility based in Kennedy Way, Tiverton, Devon, England. It is managed by Royal Devon University Healthcare NHS Foundation Trust.

== History ==
The hospital has its origins in a facility in Bampton Street which opened as the Tiverton Infirmary in 1860. It became Tiverton Hospital in 1912 and joined the National Health Service in 1948. The current facility, which was also intended to replace the old Belmont Hospital as well as the Bampton Street facility, was procured under a private finance initiative contract and opened in May 2004. In spring 2016, 40 inpatient beds at the hospital were allocated to the Royal Devon and Exeter Hospital to resolve the lack of capacity at the latter hospital during the busy winter period.
