= South Western Ambulance Service =

UK ambulance service

South Western Ambulance Service NHS Foundation Trust
- SWASFT

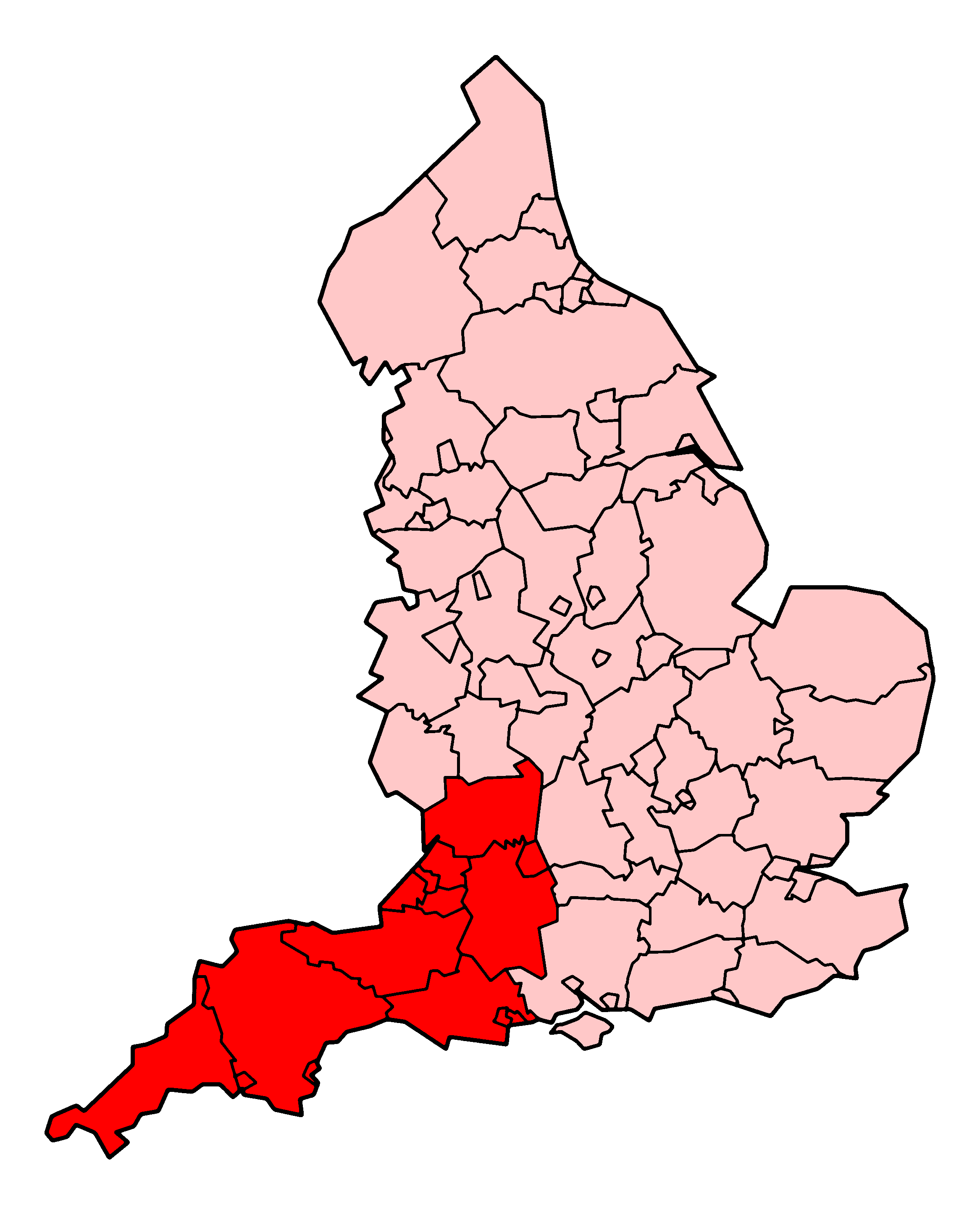
- Regions served by South Western Ambulance Service
- Type: NHS foundation trust
- Established: 1 July 2006 (Cornwall, Devon, Dorset and Somerset); 1 February 2013 (merged with Great Western Ambulance Service)
- Headquarters: Exeter
- Region served: Bath and North East Somerset, Bournemouth, Christchurch and Poole Council, Bristol, Cornwall, Devon, Dorset, Gloucestershire, North Somerset, Plymouth, Isles of Scilly, Somerset, South Gloucestershire, Swindon, Torbay and Wiltshire
- Area size: 10,000 square miles (26,000 km^{2})
- Population: 5.5 million (2018)
- Establishments: 96 Ambulance stations
- Budget: £227.6 million (planned, 2018–19)
- Chair: Richard Crompton
- Chief executive: Dr John Martin
- Website: www.swast.nhs.uk

The South Western Ambulance Service NHS Foundation Trust (SWASFT) is the organisation responsible for providing ambulance services for the National Health Service (NHS) across South West England. It serves the council areas of Bath and North East Somerset, Bournemouth, Christchurch and Poole Council, Bristol, Cornwall, Devon, Dorset, Gloucestershire, North Somerset, Plymouth, Isles of Scilly, Somerset, South Gloucestershire, Swindon, Torbay and Wiltshire.

On 1 March 2011, SWASFT was the first ambulance service in the country to become a NHS foundation trust. On 1 February 2013, the former Great Western Ambulance Service merged with the trust.

SWASFT serves a population of more than 5.5 million, and its area is estimated to receive an influx of over 17.5 million visitors each year. The operational area is predominantly rural but also has large urban centres including Bristol, Plymouth, Exeter, Truro, Bath, Swindon, Gloucester, Bournemouth and Poole.

The service is headquartered in Exeter, Devon. It has 96 ambulance stations and six charity-operated air ambulance bases within its area. The chief executive is John Martin.

The trust's core operations include:

- Emergency ambulance 999 services
- Urgent Care Services (UCS) – GP out-of-hours medical care (Dorset)
- Tiverton Urgent Care Centre.

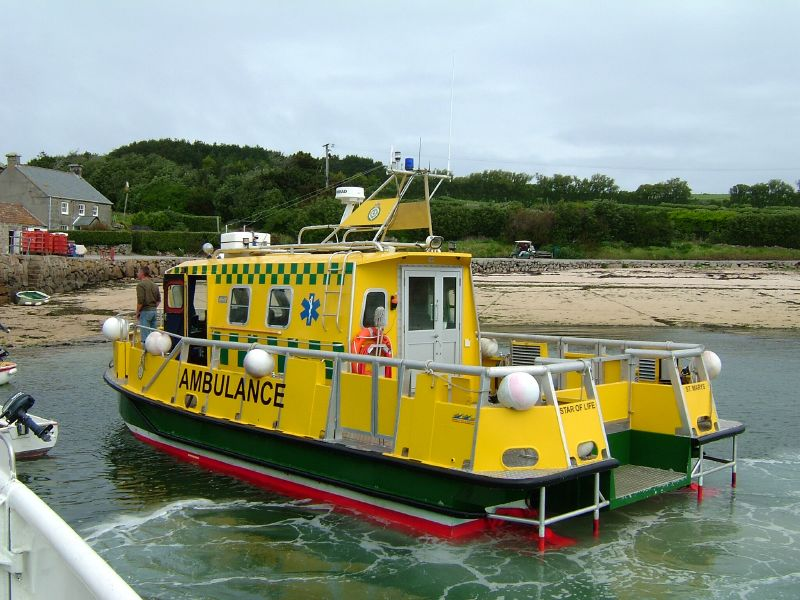
The Star of Life ambulance boat serves the Scilly Isles

It is one of the ambulance trusts providing England with emergency medical services, and employs around 4,500 mainly clinical and operational staff (including Paramedics, Emergency Care Practitioners, Advanced Technicians, Emergency Care Assistants, Ambulance Care Assistants and Nurse Practitioners). In addition there are around 3,200 volunteers including community first responders, BASICS doctors, fire service co-responders and patient transport drivers.

== Facts and figures ==
The trust covers an area of 10,000 square miles (26,000 km^{2}). There are 95 ambulance stations, six air ambulance bases delivered by five charities, two control rooms, two Hazardous Area Response Team (HART) bases and one boat across the SWASFT operational area.

In 2017/2018, approximately one in nine 999 calls to SWASFT were treated over the telephone. "Hear and treat", where the patient receives clinical advice over the telephone, accounted for 11.6% of calls. For 35.8% of incidents the patients experienced "see and treat", when the patient receives treatment or advice at the scene of the incident. In a further 5.9% of incidents, the patient was taken to a non-emergency hospital department such as a community hospital or minor injuries unit. The remaining incidents resulted in a patient being taken to a hospital emergency department, thus around half of the incidents (53%) resulted in a patient not being conveyed.

In 2017, SWASFT was the best performing ambulance service in the country for non-conveyance rates. In addition approximately 62% of patients taken to hospital were admitted – this is again the highest (best) performance for an ambulance trust in the country. This means that when SWASFT takes a patient to an emergency department they are likely to be admitted, not simply treated and discharged, confirming that this is the right place for them to receive the care they need.

The number of compliments received by the trust in 2014/2015 increased by 41% to 2,055 while complaints also rose by 20% to 1,268.

The inspection of the trust by the Care Quality Commission in 2016 identified several areas which required improvement.

The trust's income for 2017/18 was £240 million. In 2018, the trust said it would need an extra £12M a year to meet the new ambulance performance standards.

== CQC performance rating ==
In its last inspection of the service in June 2018, the Care Quality Commission (CQC) gave the following ratings on a scale of outstanding (the service is performing exceptionally well), good (the service is performing well and meeting our expectations), requires improvement (the service isn't performing as well as it should) and inadequate (the service is performing badly):

Inspection Reports
| Area | 2016 Rating | 2018 Rating |
|---|---|---|
| Are services Safe? | Requires improvement | Requires improvement |
| Are services Effective? | Requires improvement | Good |
| Are services Caring? | Outstanding | Outstanding |
| Are services Responsive? | Good | Good |
| Are services Well-led? | Requires improvement | Good |
| Overall rating | Requires improvement | Good |

== Structure ==
SWASFT has two emergency control centres which take emergency calls and dispatch resources: one within the Exeter headquarters and the other at Filton, north of Bristol. As of 2018, the centres had a combined staff of around 450.

After a reorganisation in 2018, the trust's operations and ambulance stations are divided into eight areas.

- Bristol, North Somerset & South Gloucestershire
- Cornwall & Isles of Scilly
- North & East Devon
- South & West Devon
- Dorset
- Gloucestershire
- Somerset
- Wiltshire

=== Air ambulances ===
From its control centre, SWASFT is able to deploy a number of charity-funded air ambulance services that operate within its area:

- Cornwall Air Ambulance
- Devon Air Ambulance
- Dorset and Somerset Air Ambulance
- Great Western Air Ambulance
- Wiltshire Air Ambulance

== Vehicle fleet ==
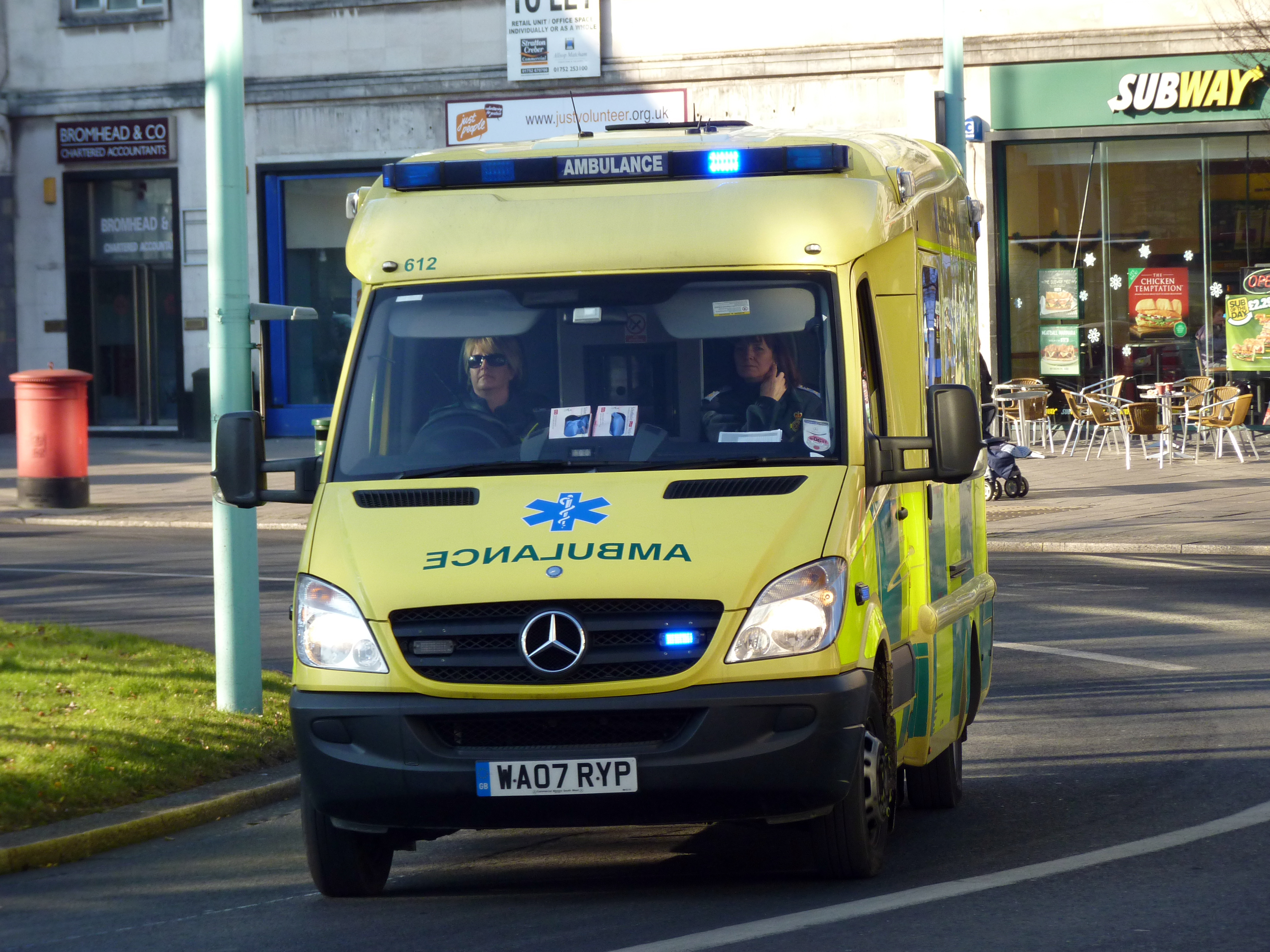
SWAST ambulance on an emergency call

The SWASFT vehicle fleet includes

- emergency ambulances
- patient transport ambulances
- rapid response vehicles
- rapid response motorcycles
- bicycles
- hazardous area response teams (based in Exeter and Bristol)
- ALN 043 Star of Life Wave Saver 1000 Class ambulance boat

The trust has 16 vehicle preparation units where ambulances are cleaned and restocked before returning to service. The largest is just off the M5 near Exeter, dealing with 16 vehicles twice a day.

== Tiverton Urgent Care Centre ==
In May 2014, the trust won a contract to run a doctor-led minor injuries unit at Tiverton and District Hospital, Devon. Patients do not need an appointment to visit the centre, which is open seven days a week and provides treatment for minor injuries and ailments.

== Former services ==
SWASFT ran the NHS 111 non-emergency phone service for Dorset, from a call centre at St Leonards. In 2016, the Care Quality Commission told SWASFT to make significant improvements in the service. In July 2019, the trust announced that it was handing back the contract for the service, owing to staff shortages, and on 1 May 2020, the 111 service transferred to Dorset HealthCare.

== See also ==
- Emergency medical services in the United Kingdom
- List of NHS trusts
