= Exminster Hospital =

Former English mental health facility

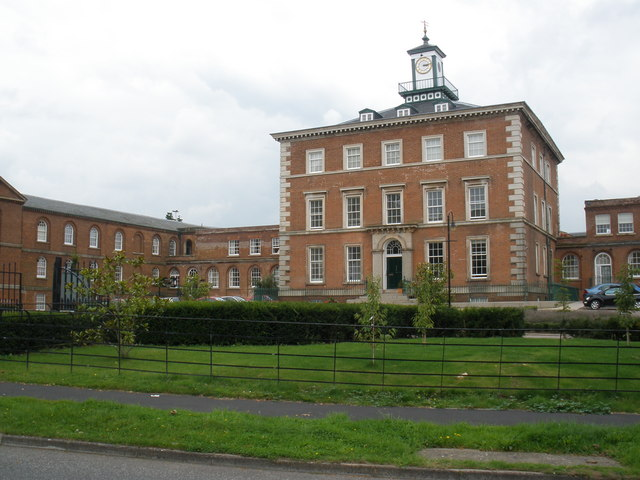
- Exminster Hospital, now known as Devington Park

- Shown in Devon

Geography
- Location: Exminster, Devon, England
- Coordinates: 50.6826°N 3.5035°W

Organisation
- Care system: NHS
- Type: Specialist

Services
- Emergency department: N/A
- Speciality: Psychiatric Hospital

History
- Founded: 1845
- Closed: 1985

Links
- Lists: Hospitals in England

Exminster Hospital is a former mental health facility at Exminster, Devon, England. It is a Grade II* listed building.

== History ==
The hospital, which was designed by Charles Fowler using a radial plan of the panopticon type, opened as the Devon County Lunatic Asylum in July 1845. Ceramic picture tiles were used to decorate the hospital; they depicted medieval musicians and one was a commemorative tile for Queen Victoria's Golden Jubilee dated 1887. It was used as military hospital during the First World War and then became known as Devon Mental Hospital in the 1920s.

It was badly bombed during the Second World War and joined the National Health Service as Exminster Hospital in 1948 before becoming known as Exe Vale Hospital (Exminster Branch) in the 1970s. After the introduction of Care in the Community in the early 1980s, the hospital went into a period of decline and closed in July 1985. The main building was converted into apartments between 2001 and 2008 and is now known as Devington Park.

== See also ==
- Digby Hospital (a separate branch of Exe Vale Hospital)
- Wonford House Hospital
