= Heavitree isolation hospital =

- Shown in Devon

Geography
- Location: Exeter, Devon, England, United Kingdom
- Coordinates: 50.7310°N 3.47203°W

Organisation
- Care system: Public NHS
- Type: Specialist

Services
- Speciality: Tuberculosis

History
- Founded: 1903
- Closed: 1947

Links
- Lists: Hospitals in England

The Heavitree isolation hospital, also for a time known as the Exeter Corporation Tuberculosis Sanatorium, was a small pulmonary tuberculosis sanatorium located on Hollow Lane, Exeter, United Kingdom. The site is a few hundred metres to the west of the Whipton Hospital (formerly the Whipton Isolation Hospital).

== History ==
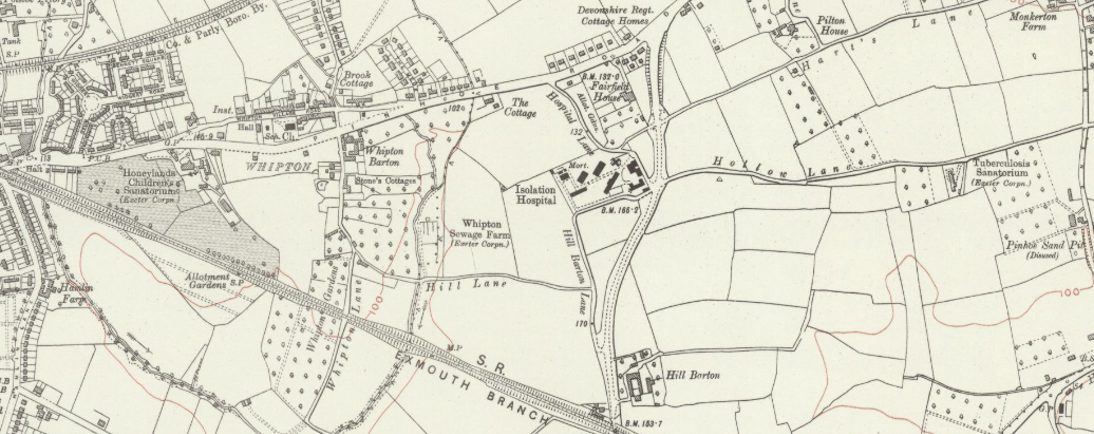
1932 OS map showing the three sanatoria located in the Whipton area of Exeter, with Heavitree isolation hospital to the right (East) of the map marked "Tuberculosis Sanatorium (Exeter Corp.)", Whipton Hospital in the centre, and Honeylands children's sanatorium to the West (left)

=== Foundation as an isolation hospital ===
Despite its name, the sanatorium is in the Pinhoe/Monkerton area of Exeter, and is not to be confused with the Heavitree Hospital, also known as the Royal Devon and Exeter (Heavitree). This is because the building was erected by the Heavitree parish, but in the neighbouring parish of Pinhoe, against strenuous objection by the locals and council of that area.

The Heavitree council had been trying to find a site, considering and rejecting other sites as early as 1899.

The building was built in around 1903, some time before the larger Whipton Hospital, which was built following the tuberculosis acts of parliament in 1912.

In 1913, the Exeter City Council took over the sanatorium from Heavitree Council, as part of the response to the passage of the new tuberculosis regulations.

Residents and the parish council of Pinhoe continued to complain that patients from the sanatorium were visiting the village and spitting. The council responded that there was no danger of infection, and that patients were required to only spit in the flask they are provided with, or risk expulsion from the facility.

=== Remand school ===
In 1947, the premises was converted for use as remand school, the Pinhoe Remand Home for Girls, under the control of the Devon County Education Committee.

There were 10 'cases' in the home in 1952, but by 1953, there was only one girl resident in the home, with five staff to care for her, and the closure of the home was announced.

The inspection report of the remand home will be unsealed from the National Archives on 1 January 2028.

=== Learning disability school ===
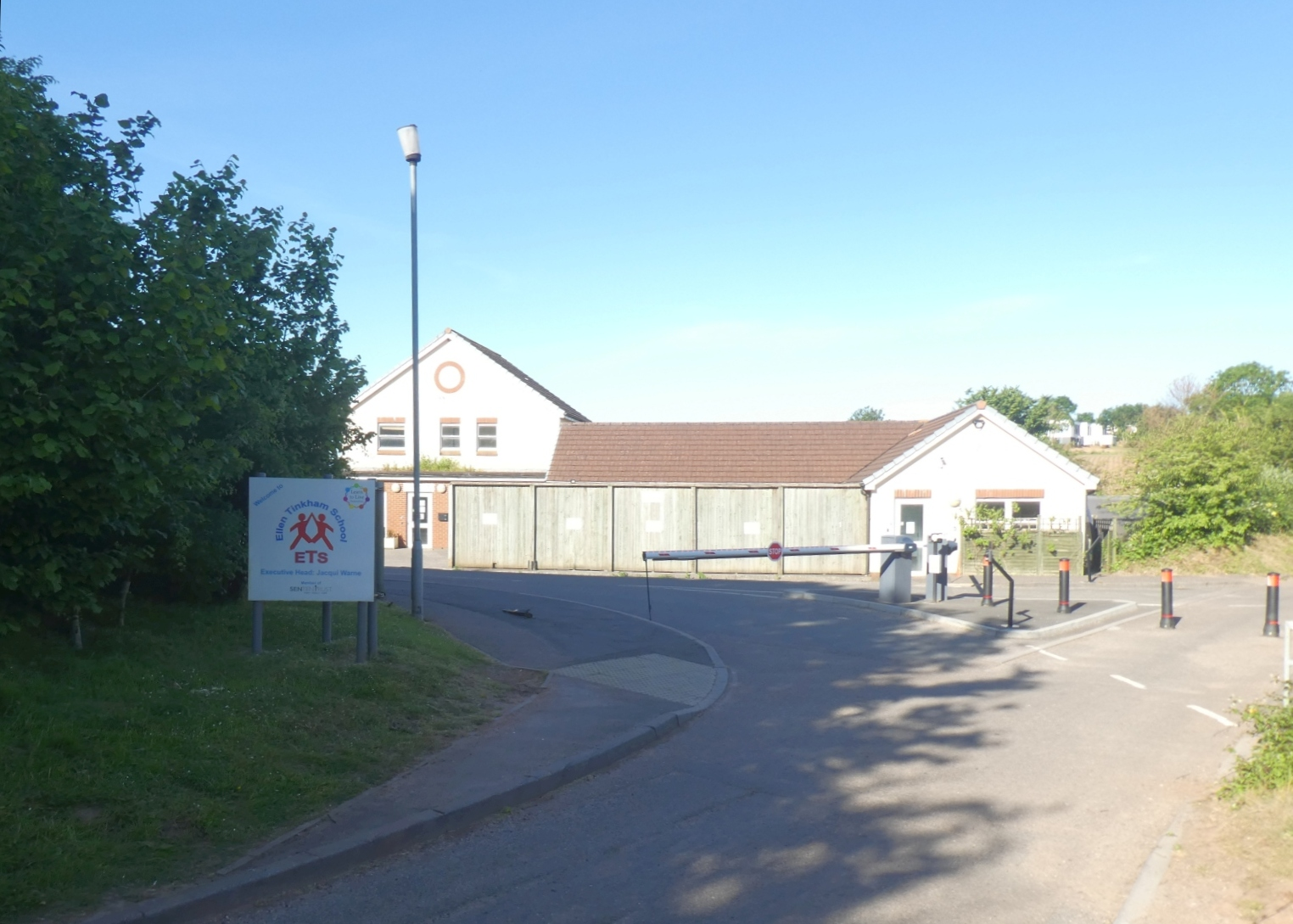
Entrance to the Ellen Tinkham School

Following the closure, in 1954 the council changed the use again, this time for use for children with learning disabilities, under the Mental Deficiency Act 1913.

The site has continued in this role ever since, and is now known as the Ellen Tinkham School.
