= Royal Devon University Healthcare NHS Foundation Trust =

NHS hospital trust

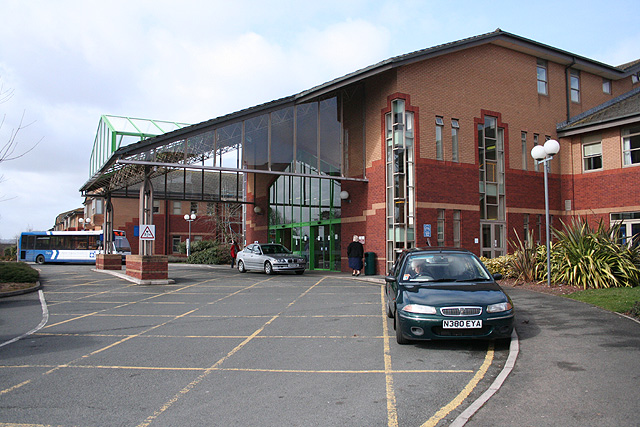
- The Royal Devon and Exeter Hospital, headquarters of Royal Devon University Healthcare NHS Foundation Trust
- Former name: Royal Devon and Exeter NHS Foundation Trust
- Type: NHS foundation trust
- Established: 1 April 2022
- Headquarters: Royal Devon & Exeter Hospital (Wonford), Barrack Road, Exeter, EX2 5DW
- Hospitals: Royal Devon and Exeter Hospital; North Devon District Hospital; Heavitree Hospital
- Chair: Shan Morgan
- Chief executive: Sam Higginson
- Website: royaldevon.nhs.uk

The Royal Devon University Healthcare NHS Foundation Trust operates Royal Devon and Exeter Hospital, North Devon District Hospital, and other smaller centres.

== History ==
On 1 April 1993, the Royal Devon and Exeter Healthcare NHS Trust started managing services provided by the Royal Devon and Exeter Hospital and associated sites.

The Trust's application for NHS Foundation Trust status was approved in December 2003 before becoming effective on 1 April 2004 creating the Royal Devon and Exeter NHS Foundation Trust.

The Trust took over the management of Castle Place Practice with 15,000 patients in Tiverton in 2018. It also now runs a number of community services including inpatient beds in Tiverton, Sidmouth and Exmouth.

The Trust merged with the Northern Devon Healthcare NHS Trust in April 2022 to form the Royal Devon University Healthcare NHS Foundation Trust, chaired by Dame Shan Morgan.

== Performance ==
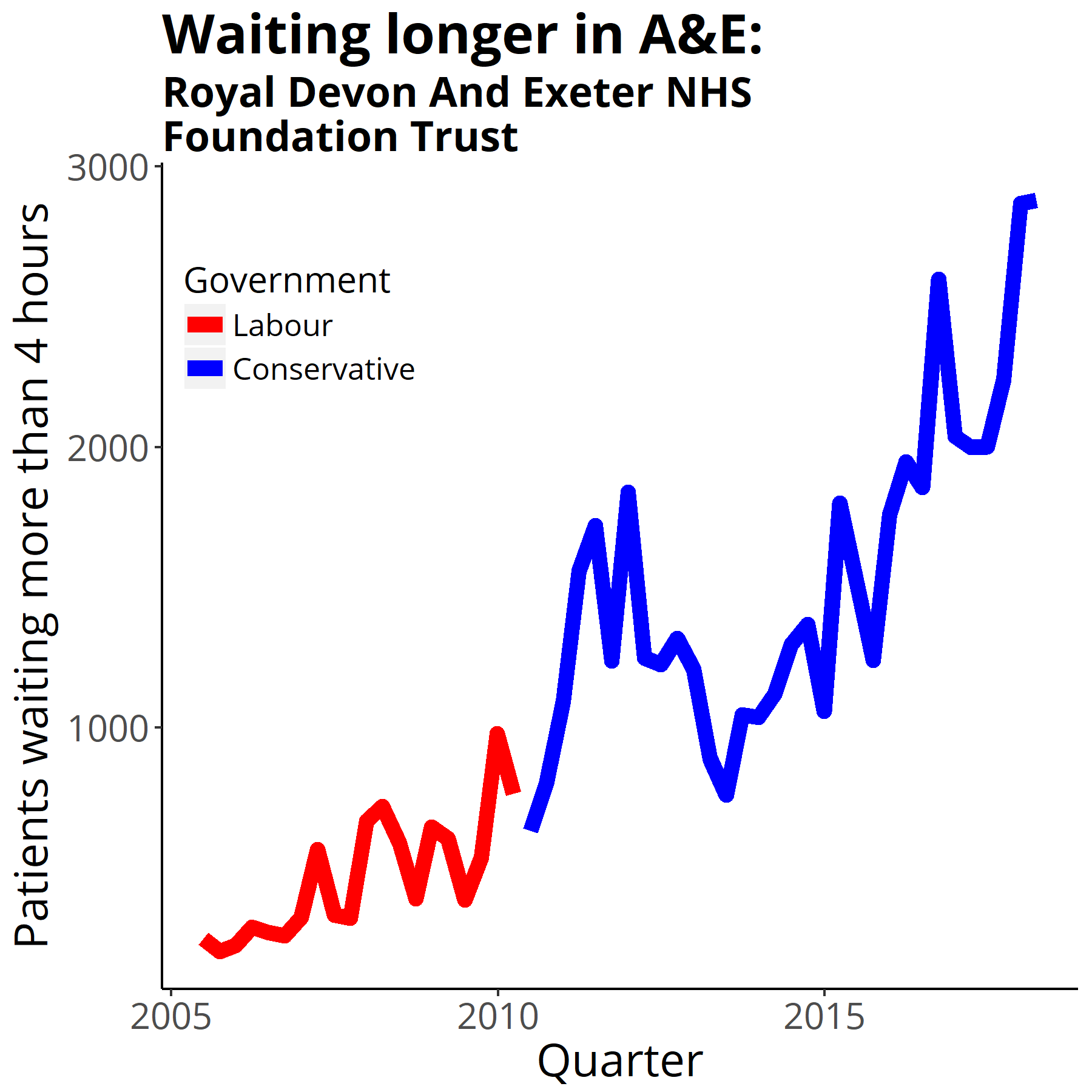
Four-hour target in the emergency department quarterly figures from NHS England Data from https://www.england.nhs.uk/statistics/statistical-work-areas/ae-waiting-times-and-activity/

In October 2014, it was reported that the Trust was not meeting the government target for 85% of cancer patients to be treated within 62 days of being referred by their GP. The trust said it was due to increasing demand for complex surgery, and that treatment was only delayed if "clinically appropriate".

In May 2015, the trust reported an end-of-year deficit of £11.2 million – an increase of £8.1M compared with the previous financial year. It expects a deficit of £20.2M for 2015/6.

== Developments ==
In 2018, the trust announced that it was to implement a single Epic Systems electronic patient record systems in place of the 15 systems it has been using. It cost £42M. The trust said "Patients will be able to access their patient records, medical history, and test results, and they will get instant confirmation of when appointments are booked rather than having to wait for letters to arrive."

In 2021 the trust bought the site of its local Nightingale Hospital, on an industrial estate outside the city, which will be used for several types of elective care. It plans to lease two modular operating theatres on the site.

== Sites ==
Site currently managed by the Trust include:

Hospitals

- Royal Devon and Exeter Hospital
- North Devon District Hospital
- Heavitree Hospital

Community Hospitals

- Axminster Hospital
- Bideford Community Hospital
- Crediton Hospital
- Exmouth Hospital
- Holsworthy Community Hospital
- Honiton Hospital
- Ilfracombe Tyrrell Hospital
- Moretonhampstead Hospital
- Okehampton Hospital
- Ottery St Mary Hospital
- Seaton Hospital
- Sidmouth Hospital
- South Molton Community Hospital
- Tiverton and District Hospital
- Torrington Hospital
- Whipton Hospital

Other centres

- Barnstaple Health Centre
- Barnstaple Vaccination Centre
- Budleigh Community Site (Seachange)
- Castle Place Practice
- Exeter Mobility Centre
- Exeter Oncology Centre
- Exeter Vaccination Centre
- Fern Centre
- Litchdon House
- Lyn Health Medical & Minor Injury Service
- Mardon Neuro-Rehabilitation Centre
- Macleod Diabetes and Endocrine Centre
- Nightingale Hospital Exeter
- Plymouth Vaccination Centre
- Sidwell Street Walk-in Centre

== See also ==
- List of NHS trusts
- Healthcare in Devon
