= Newcourt, Exeter =

Devon suburb

Coordinates: 50°42.2′N 3°28.6′W

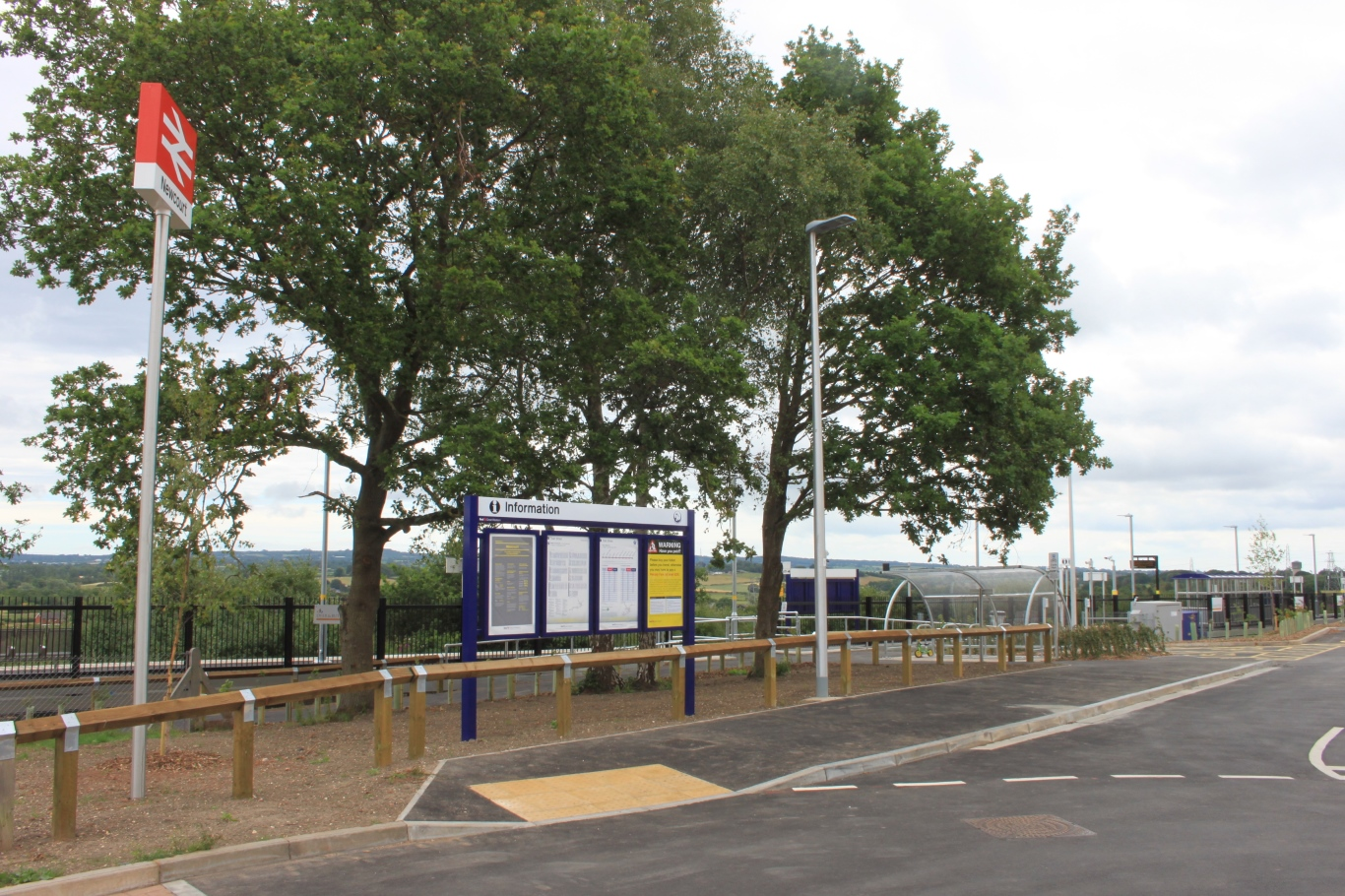
Newcourt railway station, opened in 2015.

Newcourt is a suburb of Exeter and Topsham in Devon, England, located between Digby and Topsham. It has a railway station and forms part of the electoral ward of Topsham. Other local amenities include a school and a community centre.

== History ==
During World War II, much of the land at Newcourt was used as a US Navy Supply Depot due to the strong transport links of Exeter. This facility was instrumental in the Normandy landings. In 2010, Exeter City Council produced a masterplan for Newcourt to include provisions for 3,500 homes to be built by 2026.
