= Heavitree hospital =

Heavitree Hospital
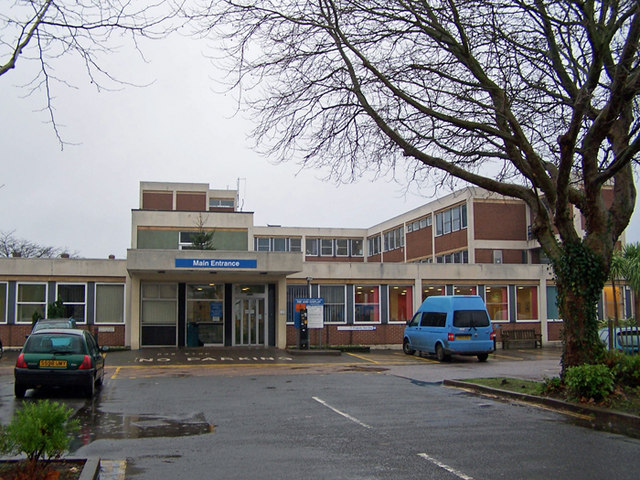
- Entrance of the hospital in 2009

- Shown in Devon

Geography
- Location: Heavitree, Exeter, Devon, England, United Kingdom
- Coordinates: 50.72468°N 3.5143°W

Organisation
- Care system: Public NHS

History
- Founded: 1701

Links
- Lists: Hospitals in England

The Heavitree Hospital (currently branded as the Royal Devon and Exeter Hospital (Heavitree)) is a hospital currently operated by the Royal Devon University Healthcare NHS Foundation Trust, as a satellite site of the Royal Devon and Exeter Hospital with its main site a short distance away at Wonford. The hospital started as the Exeter Workhouse and was also known as the Exeter City Hospital.

== History ==
=== Exeter Workhouse ===
Since 1667, there had been a workhouse for the poor in Exeter, endowed by the Canon John Bury of St Mary Major church and in the parish of St Sidwell.

In 1698, parliament passed the Poor Law Act, and Exeter was one of the first cities to respond, creating a corporation for the relief of the poor. This corporation purchased and closed the St Sidwell workhouse, replacing it at a new site on the London Road at Heavitree. Work started on the building in 1699, and the new building opened in 1701, with the whole site finished by 1707.

The building was two stories and an attic, arranged with a central chapel and wings extended at each side, along with a central cupola and clock.

There were around 200 inmates at the facility who were put to work.

=== First incarnation of the Exeter City Hospital ===
In 1741, the Royal Devon and Exeter Hospital (RD&E) was founded at Southernhay, in the city centre, and at the behest of local land owners and clergy, the workhouse was renamed to Exeter City Hospital, operating in competition to the RD&E hospital.

The hospital opened with forty beds and £100 annual funding from the corporation.

This was not a success, and by 1754, the hospital closed due to lack of funds, and with patients preferring the RD&E. The complex reverted to being a workhouse.

=== Expanding medical facilities ===
With a growth in demand, from 1821, the workhouse started treating fever cases from across the city, as well as providing maternity facilities. To cope with this, a number of additional buildings were added up until 1858.

In 1877, the corporation was dissolved and became a Poor Law Union. By 1894, the city council has ceased its formal involvement.

The medical side continued to grow, beyond the needs of the workhouse itself, and it had a large hospital facility to the north of the main workhouse building.

=== New infirmary ===
In 1905, a new infirmary was built at the north of the site with four blocks - an administration building, men's and women's blocks at the east and west, and a single-story maternity block. A fifth block for the treatment of tuberculosis was planned, but never built.

A children's home was added on the site at the South-East of the site in 1913, facing the Heavitree road.

=== Second incarnation of the Exeter City Hospital ===
In 1939, the workhouse once again became the Exeter City Hospital.

Bombing during the Second World War in 1942 extensively damaged the original 1700s workhouse buildings, and destroyed the male ward of the new infirmary. The rest of the new infirmary remained standing, and forms part of the modern hospital. The children's home also survived, and was part of the hospital until sale and conversion to student accommodation in the 2010s.

On 5 July 1948, the City Hospital joined the newly formed National Health Service.

A fire broke out at the hospital on 13 February 1970, in the Seward ward, killing five people. This caused the South Western Regional Hospital Board to make changes at other hospitals, particularly in relation to the material of beds and bedding.

=== Merger with Royal Devon and Exeter ===
Eventually, the hospital merged with former competitor, the Royal Devon and Exeter hospital, which was relocated to its new site at Wonford in the 1970s, only a short distance from Heavitree.

The hospital is now part of the Royal Devon University Healthcare NHS Foundation Trust.

The southwest portion of the site was sold to the John Lewis Partnership, who demolished the buildings and built a Waitrose store, which opened on 6 October 2011.

== Services ==
The hospital now operates as a satellite of the main Royal Devon and Exeter Hospital at the nearby Wonford, offering a range of services including:

- Audiology
- Day case surgery
- Dermatology
- Fertility
- Haemodialysis
- Orthopaedics
- Orthoptics
- Pain management
- Physiotherapy
- Podiatry

== See also ==
- Whipton Hospital
