= Brumwell Thomas =

English architect

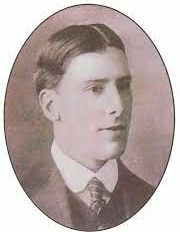
Sir Alfred Brumwell Thomas, in 1905

Sir Alfred Brumwell Thomas FRIBA (24 February 1868 – 22 January 1948) was an English architect who trained at Westminster School of Art and became an exponent of the Baroque Revival architecture, a style of architecture prevalent for public buildings in the early years of the 20th century.

== Career ==
Thomas was born in Rotherhithe, South London, the son of architect Edward Thomas.

In 1899, he designed the West of England Eye Infirmary building in Exeter, which is now a hotel.

In 1906, he was made a fellow of the Royal Institute of British Architects, knighted by King Edward VII, and also designed two more public buildings: town halls in Woolwich in South East London, and in the city of Belfast. Belfast City Hall, faced with portland stone and with a copper dome and lavish marble interiors, is thought of as the finest example of Edwardian Baroque in the British Isles.

Thomas is also known for his war memorials at Dunkirk and Belfast.

== Notable works ==
- Stockport Town Hall, 1905
- Belfast City Hall, 1906
- Woolwich Town Hall, Woolwich 1906
- Deptford Public Library, 1914, a Carnegie Library
- Addey and Stanhope School, 1899.

== Gallery of architectural work ==
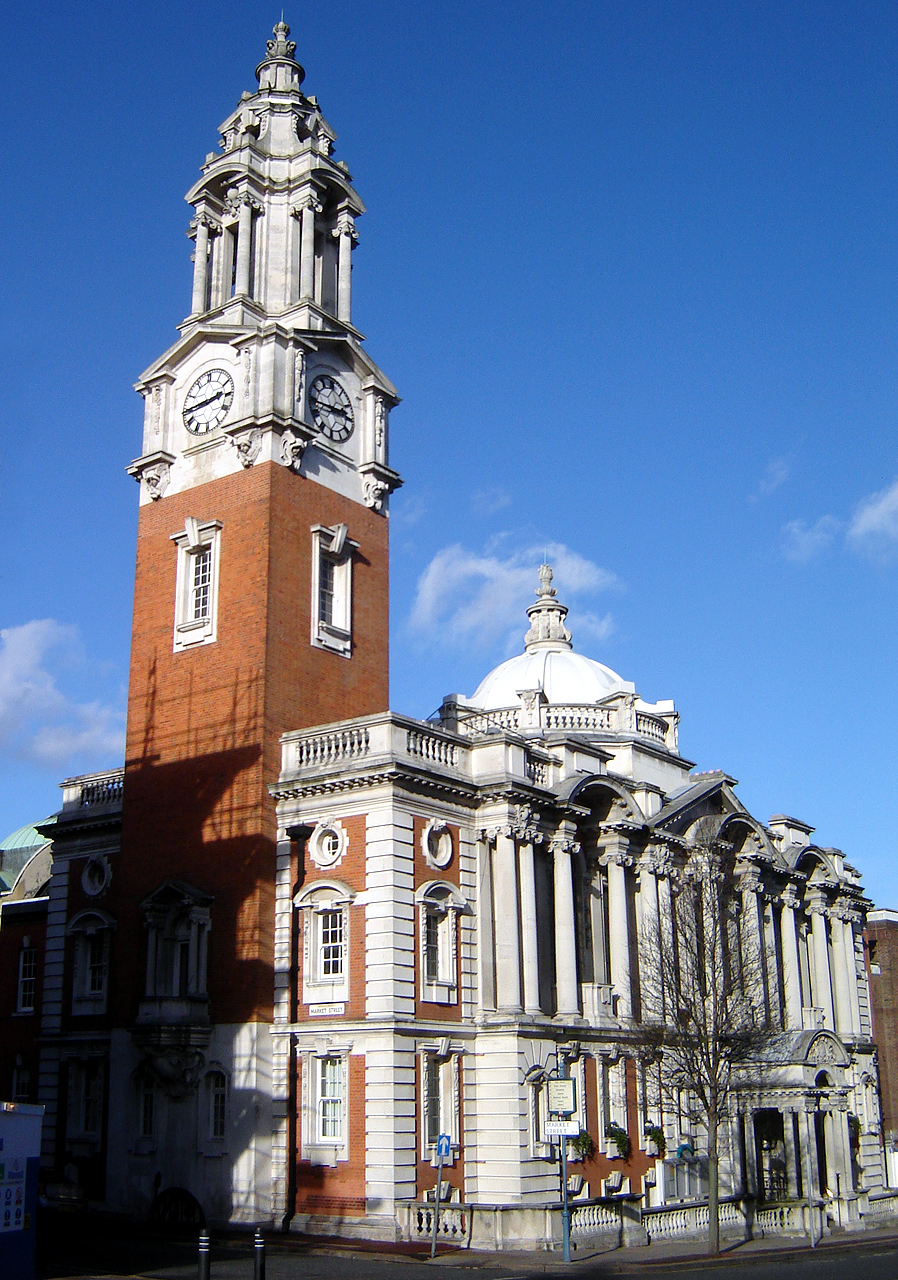
Woolwich Town Hall

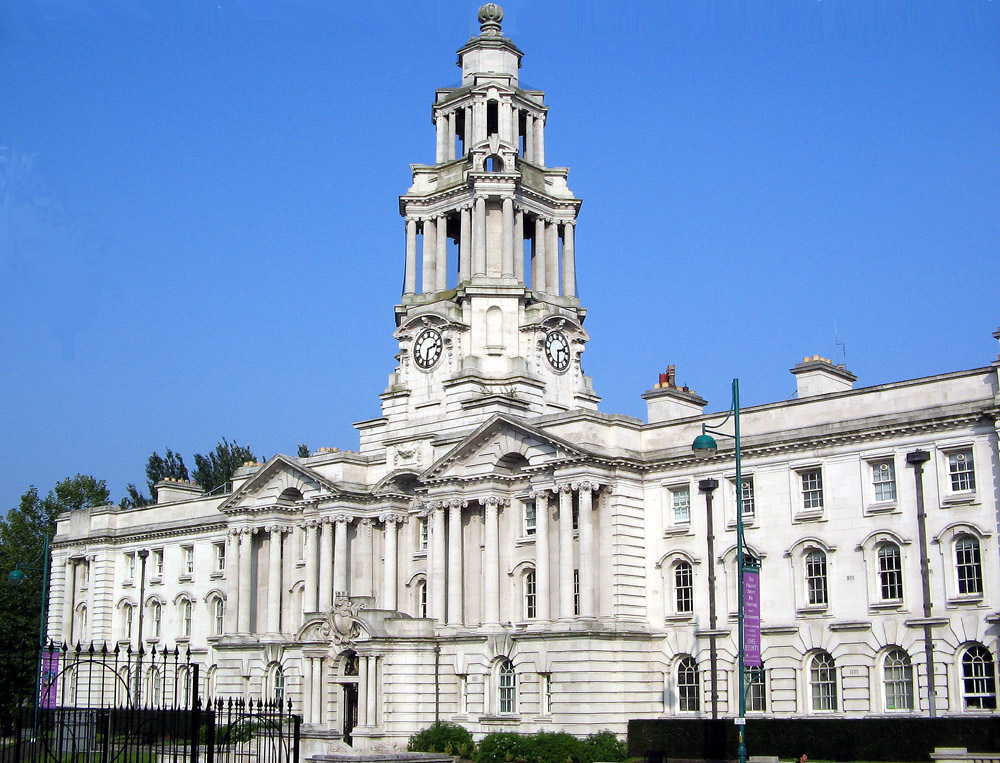
Stockport Town Hall

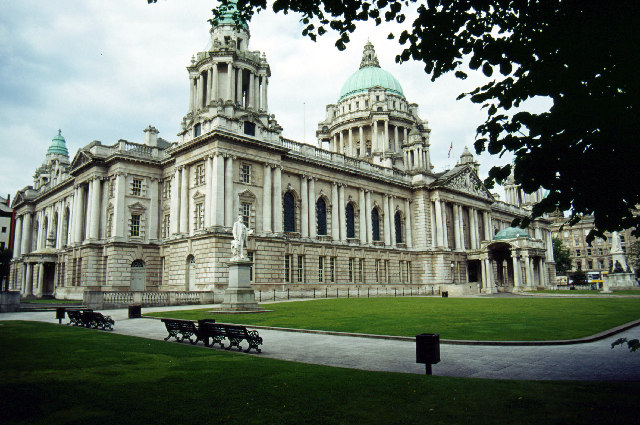
Belfast City Hall

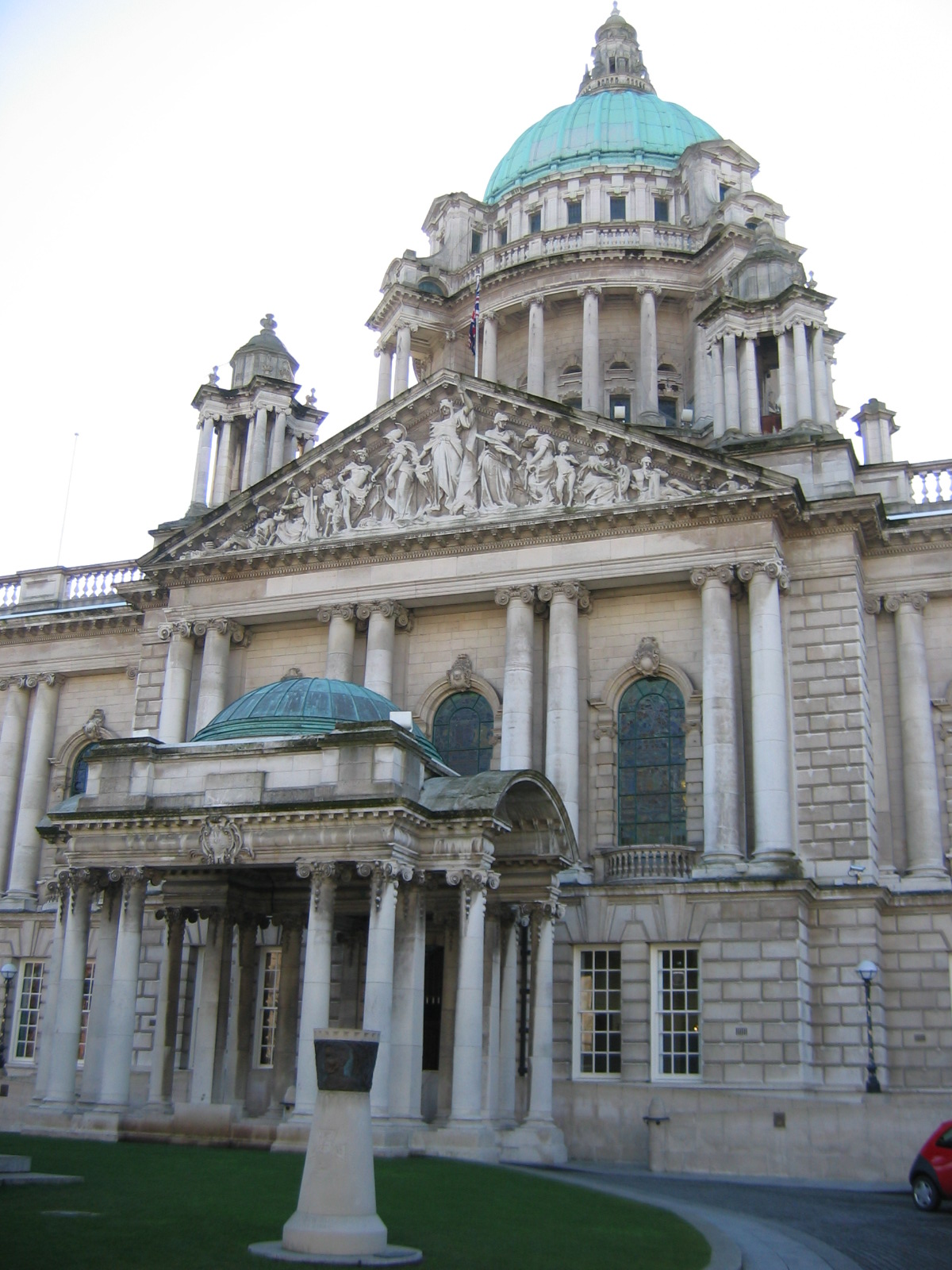
Main entrance, Belfast City Hall
