= Northern Devon Healthcare NHS Trust =

NHS trust

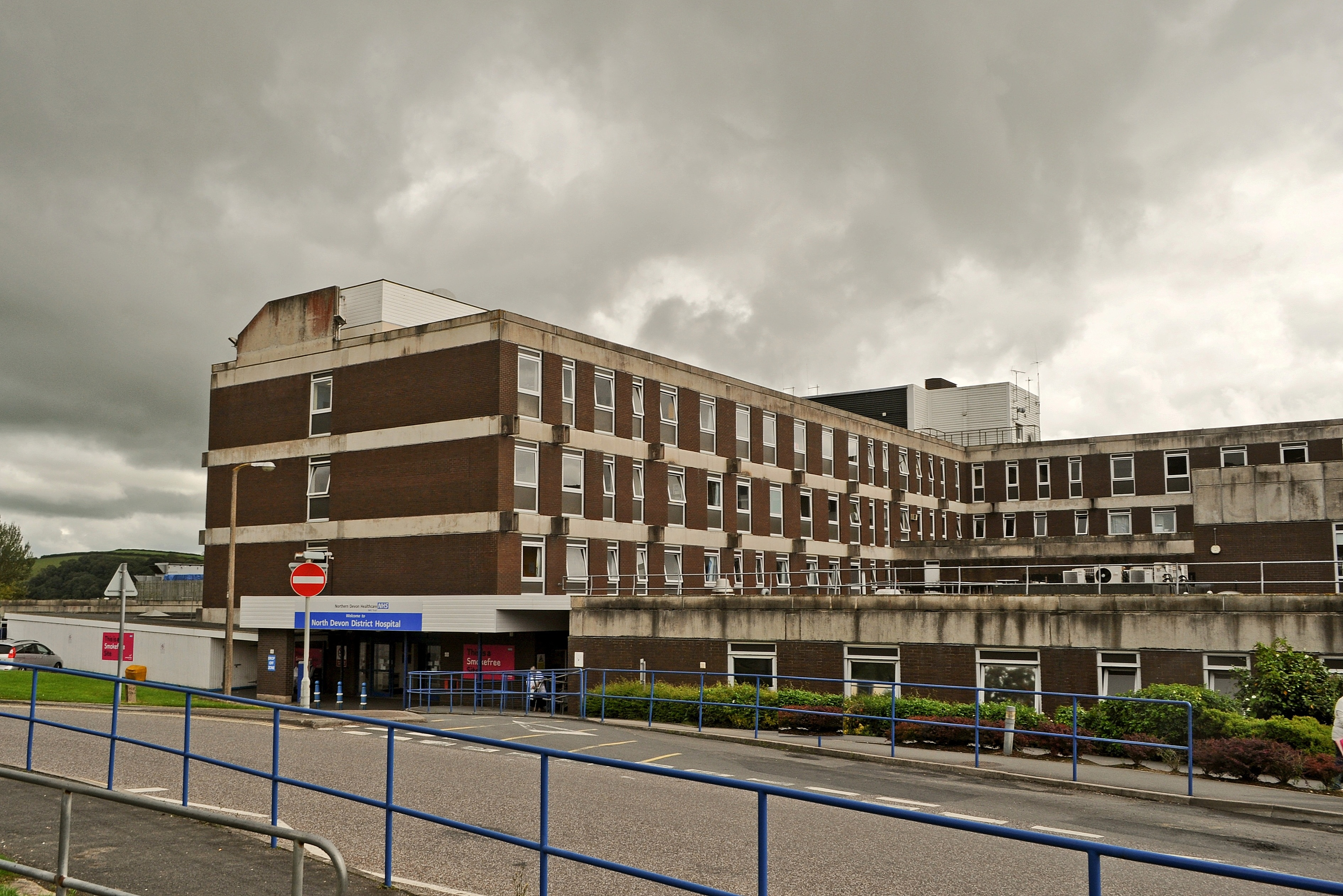
- North Devon District Hospital formerly managed by Northern Devon Healthcare NHS Trust
- Type: NHS trust
- Established: 28 January 1991
- Disbanded: 1 April 2022
- Hospitals: North Devon District Hospital; Bideford Community Hospital; Holsworthy Community Hospital; Ilfracombe Tyrrell Hospital; South Molton Community Hospital; Torrington Hospital

Northern Devon Healthcare NHS Trust ran North Devon District Hospital in Barnstaple and community hospitals in Bideford, Holsworthy, Ilfracombe, South Molton and Torrington. It merged with the Royal Devon and Exeter NHS Foundation Trust in April 2022 to form the Royal Devon University Healthcare NHS Foundation Trust.

== History ==
The Trust was established on 28 January 1991, managing services provided by North Devon District Hospital. In 2006, the Trust assumed responsibility for managing further health services in North Devon including 5 community hospitals, a health centre and district nursing.

The Trust decided in October 2015 to close medical beds in the community hospitals in Ilfracombe and Bideford in order to save money.

The Trust was criticised by the Taxpayers Alliance in December 2013 for spending more than £370,000 on 870 tablet devices for staff. The Trust said that these devices were necessary for staff who covered a wide area and saved money.

In 2018, the chair and chief executive resigned and were replaced by the chair and chief executive of the Royal Devon and Exeter NHS Foundation Trust although the two organisations remained separate.

On 1 April 2022, the Trust merged with Royal Devon and Exeter NHS Foundation Trust to form Royal Devon University Healthcare NHS Foundation Trust.

== Performance ==
In April 2014 the trust achieved a high rating in a Care Quality Commission (CQC) survey of adult inpatients, with not a single low score given for any aspect of care. It was rated better than other hospitals nationally for specific aspects of nursing regarding communication, confidence and trust and whether there were enough nurses on duty.

It was named by the Health Service Journal as one of the top hundred NHS trusts to work for in 2015. At that time it had 3,603 full-time equivalent staff and a sickness absence rate of 3.43%. 76% of staff recommend it as a place for treatment and 68% recommended it as a place to work.

The trust won a bid in March 2016 to be “prime contractor” for domiciliary care services in Northern and Mid Devon, in a contract let by the clinical commissioning groups (CCG) in the county and Devon County Council, worth £70–80 million over five years. It manages providers of domiciliary care services in three areas of the county through Devon Cares. It has significantly reduced the number patients awaiting a care package who are unable to leave hospital.

== See also ==
- List of NHS trusts
- Healthcare in Devon
