= Honeylands =

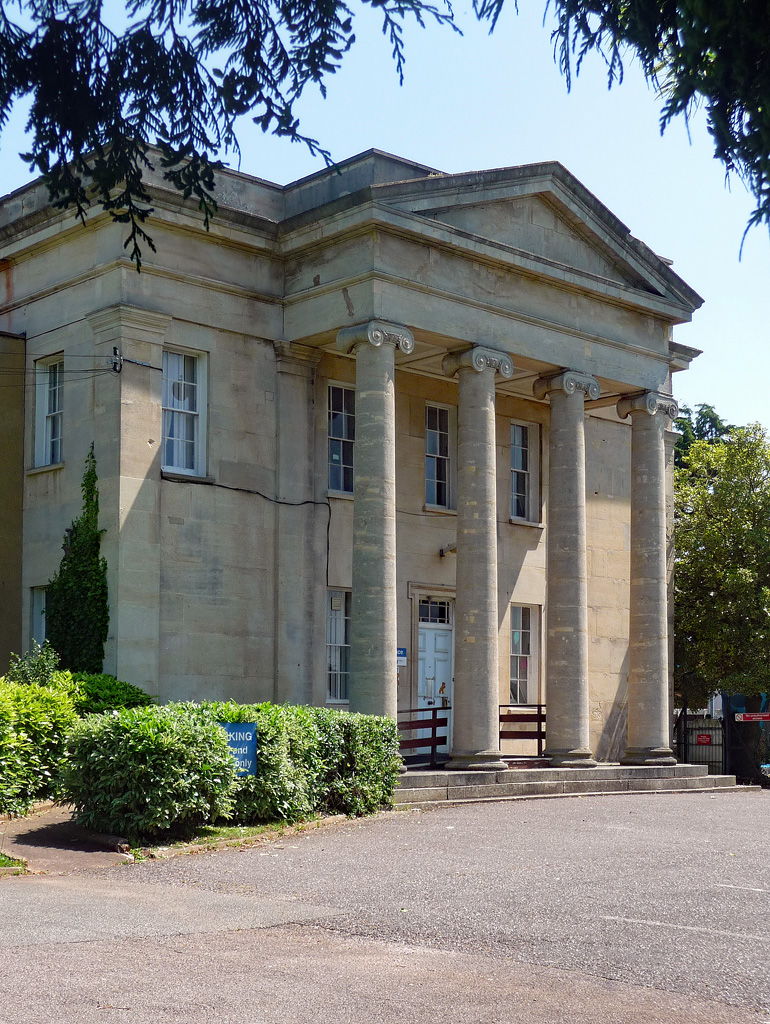
- Front of Honeylands House

- Shown in Devon

Geography
- Location: Exeter, Devon, England, United Kingdom
- Coordinates: 50.7314°N 3.4964°W

Organisation
- Care system: Public NHS
- Type: Specialist

Services
- Speciality: Tuberculosis, respiratory conditions

History
- Founded: 1923
- Closed: 2012

Links
- Lists: Hospitals in England

The Honeylands, originally the Honeylands Children's Sanatorium and later the Honeylands Children's Centre was a hospital in Exeter, Devon used as a children's pulmonary tuberculosis sanatorium, later used for treatment of children with learning difficulties. Adults were treated at the nearby Whipton Hospital.

== History ==
=== As a house ===
The site had a house before 1711, when it was sold by act of parliament upon the death of the owner of Polsloe Barton (which owned the land, despite its proximity to Whipton Barton), Samuel Isaac.

The current house dates to between 1801 and 1838 in a neo-classical revival style, and was built for lawyer John Bushell. In 1844, the house was listed as having three reception rooms, six bedrooms, two servants' rooms, stables, a coach house, laundry, farm buildings. The house sat in 47 acres with pastures and orchards, along with three other houses.

The house passed through various owners, including a doctor, hide broker, and the owner of the Devon and Somerset Store in Exeter High Street.

=== Tuberculosis sanatorium ===
In January 1923, the house was purchased by tobacco heiress Miss Violet Wills of Torquay for £5,000, and donated to Exeter City Council for the sole purpose of being used as a sanatorium for children suffering from tuberculosis. Miss Wills offered both the house and the cost of the repairs and adaptations (estimated at £1,000 - £2,000).

It opened and accepted children with TB, in May 1924, as well as those with scarlet fever and diphtheria.

In 1945, a child welfare centre (including ante and post-natal clinics) was built on the grounds of Honeylands.

The hospital joined the NHS in 1948, and along with the larger Hawkmoor Hospital near Bovey Tracey, as well as the nearby adult Whipton Hospital and the City Tuberculosis Dispensary in the city centre, Honeylands formed part of the Exeter Special Hospital Management Committee.

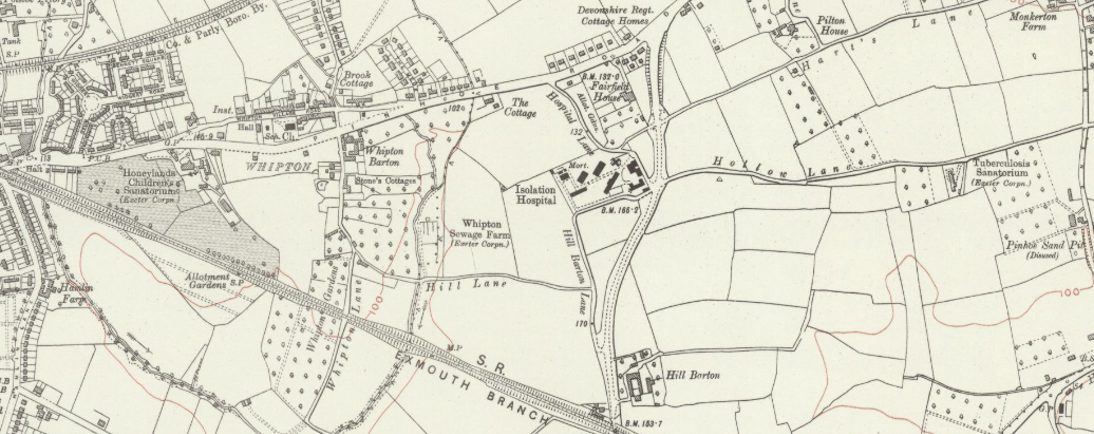
Map showing the three sanatoria located in the Whipton area of Exeter, Honeylands to the left (West of the image), Whipton Hospital in the centre, and Heavitree isolation hospital to the East (right)

== School and learning difficulties ==
Tuberculosis declined dramatically with the use of antibiotics, and whilst the hospital still took in children for recuperation from illness, they also specialised more on children with learning difficulties. The consultant paediatric doctor worked with Charles and Kay Vranch in 1966 to open Vranch House School on the site on behalf of the Exeter branch of the Spastics Society.

The centre offered both residential and community care services to children with "a handicapping condition". By 1982 it offered 30 beds, with 15-20 occupied on a typical night. Facilities were provided on long term as well as short-term respite or even a "babysitting" basis. Around 200 families were users of the service. The service also offered baby and pre-school play groups, parent and family support groups, as well as clinics and specialised primary care for those with challenging conditions.

A new facility called the Brimblecombe Wing was opened in 1971 by HRH Duchess of Kent.

The Honeylands centre was frequently mentioned as an example of best practice management for children with learning difficulties.

== Closure and redevelopment ==
The healthcare facility was closed in 2012, although the Vranch House School remains operational on another part of the site.

In 2018 retirement community developer McCarthy Stone announced plans to turn the building into one of their sites, but the site remained derelict. Planning permission was granted in 2022 for conversion to a care home, but this plan never completed and in 2026 an application was made to turn it into communal co-housing. The building is listed at grade II.
