= Pennsylvanian =

Pennsylvanian may refer to:

- Pennsylvanian, a person or thing from Pennsylvania
- Pennsylvanian (geology), a geological subperiod of the Carboniferous Period
- Pennsylvanian (train), an Amtrak train
