= Pennsylvania Avenue (disambiguation) =

Pennsylvania Avenue is a street in Washington, D.C., and its surrounding suburbs on which some major landmarks, including the White House and the United States Capitol, are located.

Pennsylvania Avenue may also refer to:

- Pennsylvania Avenue (Baltimore), a street in Baltimore, Maryland
- Pennsylvania Avenue, a portion of Connecticut Route 161
- Delaware Route 52 or Pennsylvania Avenue
- Pennsylvania Avenue (Towson, Maryland), a street in Towson's central business district
- Pennsylvania Avenue (Brooklyn), a major street in Brooklyn, New York
- Pennsylvania Avenue, a property in Monopoly (game)
- Pennsylvania Avenue (IRT New Lots Line), a New York City Subway station in Brooklyn
- Pennsylvania Avenue (BMT Fulton Street Line), a former New York City elevated railway station in Brooklyn
- West Virginia Route 105 or Pennsylvania Avenue

== See also ==
- 1600 Pennsylvania Avenue, the address of the White House, also the name of a musical
- 2000 Pennsylvania Avenue, a shopping center in Washington, D.C.
- Pennsylvania Avenue Bridge, a bridge across the Rock Creek, not to be confused with John Philip Sousa Bridge
- Pennsylvania Avenue Line (Baltimore), a former streetcar route in Baltimore, Maryland
- Pennsylvania Avenue Line (Washington), a Metrobus route in Washington, D.C.
- Pennsylvania Avenue National Historic Site, a unit of the National Park Service
- Penn Avenue in Pittsburgh, Pennsylvania
