= Digby Hospital =

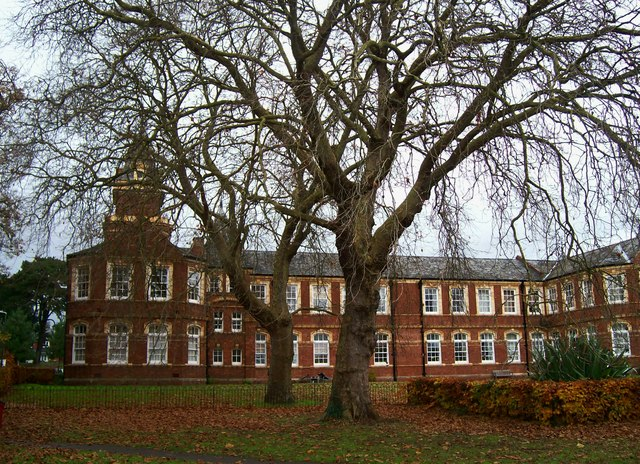
- Digby Hospital

- Shown in Devon

Geography
- Location: Digby, Devon, England
- Coordinates: 50.7111°N 3.4794°W

Organisation
- Care system: NHS
- Type: Specialist

Services
- Emergency department: N/A
- Speciality: Psychiatric Hospital

History
- Founded: 1886
- Closed: 1986

Links
- Lists: Hospitals in England

Digby Hospital was a mental health facility in Digby, Devon, England.

== History ==
The site was previously occupied by Digby Farm. The hospital, which was designed by Robert Stark Wilkinson using a Linear Corridor Plan layout, opened as City of Exeter Lunatic Asylum in September 1886. Digby & Sowton railway station, a station on the Avocet Line, was opened to service the hospital in 1908.

The asylum became Exeter City Mental Hospital in the 1920s and joined the National Health Service as Digby Hospital in 1948 before becoming known as Exe Vale Hospital (Digby Branch) in the 1970s. After the introduction of Care in the Community in the early 1980s, the hospital went into a period of decline and closed in 1986. The main building was subsequently converted into apartments and is now known as Digby Park.

== See also ==
- Exminster Hospital (a separate branch of Exe Vale Hospital)
- Wonford House Hospital
