= North Devon District Hospital =

- Royal Devon University Healthcare NHS Foundation Trust
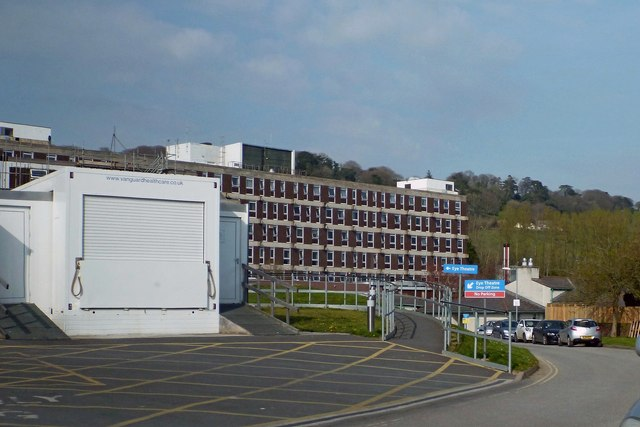
- A Vanguard mobile theatre at North Devon District Hospital

- Shown in Devon

Geography
- Location: Barnstaple, Devon, England, UK
- Coordinates: 51.092°N 4.051°W

Organisation
- Care system: National Health Service

Services
- Emergency department: Yes
- Beds: 423

History
- Founded: 23 November 1979

Links
- Website: royaldevon.nhs.uk/our-sites/north-devon-district-hospital/

North Devon District Hospital is an NHS district general hospital in the town of Barnstaple, North Devon, England run by Royal Devon University Healthcare NHS Foundation Trust.

== History ==
The hospital has its origins in the North Devon Infirmary established in Litchdon Street in 1824. Services were transferred to the present facility which occupies the site of the historic manor house of Raleigh, in the former parish of Pilton, seat of the locally influential Chichester family. The building of the hospital was promoted by Jeremy Thorpe when he was MP for Devon North and it opened at its present location in 1979.

== Services ==
It has an accident & emergency department and offers services such as orthopaedics, key hole surgery, stroke care and cancer services.
