= Exeter Power Station =

Former coal-fired power station

Haven Road Power Station
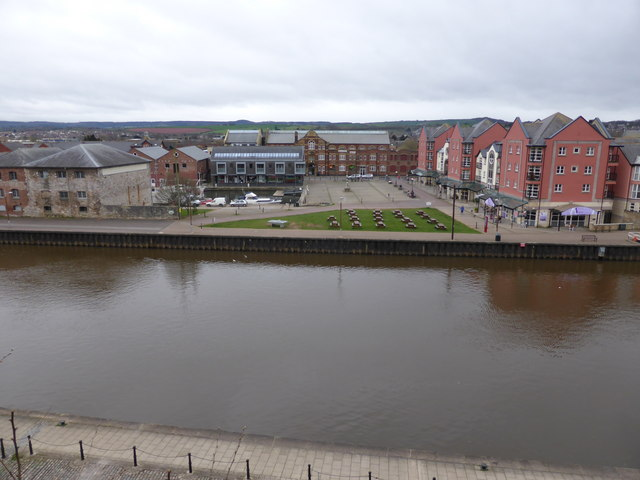
- The site in 2015
- Official name: Exeter Power Station
- Country: England
- Location: Devon, South West England
- Coordinates: 50.7157°N 3.5297°W
- Status: Closed
- Commission date: 1905
- Decommission date: 1955
- Operator: City of Exeter Electricity Company

Thermal power station
- Primary fuel: Coal

Exeter Power Station (also known as Haven Road Power Station) is a former coal-fired power station on the River Exe quayside, Exeter, England.

== History ==
Electricity demand in Exeter increased with introduction of an electric tram system. The City of Exeter Electricity Company's existing power station on New North Road needed replacing. In 1899, a hydroelectric plant at Trews Weir was proposed, but there were fears that this would affect the Exeter Ship Canal and the plans were shelved. Instead the coal-fired power station was built on a 150 ft (46 m) square at Haven Banks.

The station was constructed by W Brealey of Exeter. It was of brick construction and contained a boiler room, engine room, offices, an annexe for economisers, and a 155 ft (47 m) tall chimney at one end. The boiler room measured 102 ft (31 m) by 55 ft (17 m) and was lined with glazed bricks and had a terrazzo marble floor. British Westinghouse Electric Manufacturing Company were awarded the contract for machinery. They subcontracted boilers to Babcock & Wilcox of which three 13,000 lb/hr. These fed Belliss and Morcomtriple expansion engines with direct coupled dynamos with three sets rated at 400kw. each and a 100 kW compound set. Coal feed equipment and additional iron work was designed and built by Willey's, and cabling from the station throughout the city was provided by the Siemens Brothers of London.

Initially the station used the old boilers and generating equipment of the New North Road power station, alongside four new sets of steam driven alternators. With the equipment removed, the electric company sold the New North Road station in 1906. The Haven Road power station was opened in 1905 by Mayor Cllr Perry.

== Operations ==
Coal was delivered to the station by rail and ship. Once delivered to the station it was fed automatically onto a gravity bucket conveyor system which supplied 500 tonne capacity bunkers. These discharged onto mechanical stokers and into the boiler furnace. Ash was removed automatically.

== Expansion and later history ==
The station was part of an expansion of the City of Exeter Electricity Company, with Heavitree being added to the Exeter grid in 1906. Further expansion occurred in 1923, with the addition of Topsham, Pinhoe, Alphington and Ide, and in 1932, with the addition of Kenn, Shillingford St. George and Dunchideock, all supplied by the Haven Road station. Between 1927 and 1930, the station's generating capacity was increased from 4,000 kilowatts (kW) to 15,350 kW to meet the extra demand. Between 1900 and 1930, the number of electricity customers in Exeter grew from 350 to 18,463. In 1936 this figure grew to 19,000 customers, supplied through 300 miles (480 km) of cables to an area of 41 square miles (110 km^{2}). They also supplied electricity to the Exe Valley and East Devon electricity companies.

The station was closed in 1955. After it closed the building was used for a time as a depot for the South Western Electricity Board, and after that as a maritime museum. It is now one of few surviving pre-nationalisation power stations. In 2011, the main turbine hall was converted to house an indoor climbing centre.
