= Digby, Devon =

Village in Devon, England

Coordinates: 50.711667°N 3.477778°W

Digby
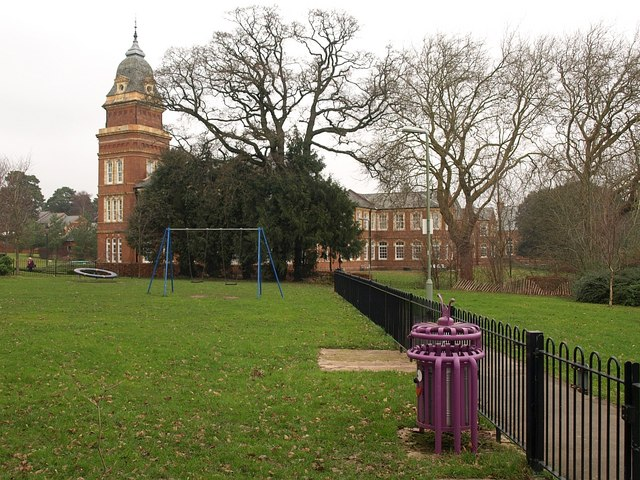
- South Grange, the former Digby Hospital building

- Location within Devon
- OS grid reference: SX9591
- District: Exeter
- Shire county: Devon
- Region: South West
- Country: England
- Sovereign state: United Kingdom
- Post town: EXETER
- Postcode district: EX2
- Dialling code: 01392
- Police: Devon and Cornwall
- Fire: Devon and Somerset
- Ambulance: South Western
- UK Parliament: Exeter

Digby is a hamlet on the eastern edge of the city of Exeter in Devon, England, located by Clyst Heath.

Between 1886 and 1987 it was the location of Exeter Lunatic Asylum, later known as Digby Hospital. Today it is mainly an area of housing, out-of-town retail and light industrial developments on the outskirts of the city with new developments of a McDonald's on the edge of the Tesco supermarket served by a frequent bus services on areas of Digby which mainly transports people into the city centre but also has Digby & Sowton railway station which has a high importance to the people living in Digby.
