= West of England Eye Infirmary =

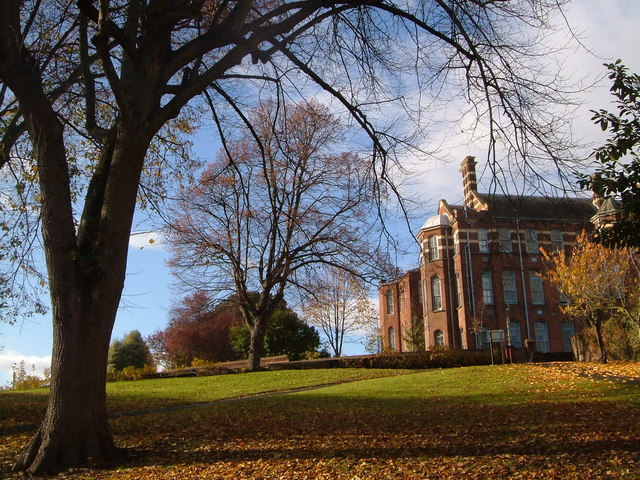
- West of England Eye Infirmary Magdalen Street building

- Shown in Devon

Geography
- Location: Exeter, Devon, England, United Kingdom
- Coordinates: 50.7201°N 3.5266°W

Organisation
- Care system: Public NHS
- Type: Speciality

History
- Founded: 1808
- Closed: 1992

Links
- Lists: Hospitals in England

The West of England Eye Infirmary was a specialist ophthalmic hospital in Exeter, Devon, England.

== History ==
=== Foundation ===
A meeting was held on 11 August 1808 at the Royal Clarence Hotel where plans were made for a dedicated eye hospital in Exeter. The hospital was set up in a house on Holloway Street, with seven beds. The West of England Eye Infirmary was the first dedicated regional eye hospital outside London, although at least 18 others were set up in the following 25 years, including one at Taunton.

The hospital opened on 1 November 1808, under the patronage of the Prince of Wales (later George IV), and in its first year treated 815 patients.

=== Move to Magdalen Street ===
Only 5 years after opening, the Holloway Street property was too small for the patient demand, and the hospital moved to larger premises at Magdalen Street in 1813. The new property was a three storey house, which was extended over the years.

A second surgeon was appointed in 1836.

In 1880, the hospital acquired additional land between the infirmary and Bull Meadow, until a large continuous plot was in possession of the hospital.

A number of extensions and alterations to the building were made in 1882, and twenty new beds were added, making a total of 50 inpatient beds.

=== New building ===
The committee of the hospital proposed a new premises in 1892. An appeal was launched in 1896 to fund a new building, although progress was initially slow. The foundation stone of the new building was laid on 11 April 1899, with a design by Sir Alfred Brumwell Thomas.

By October 1900, two sections of the new building were nearing completion, although the committee did not raise as much money as had been hoped, and therefore had to take loans against capital to complete the work.

The new buildings were opened on 10 October 1901 by Margaret, Lady Clinton. At the time of opening, over £6,000 still remained to be raised that has been advanced from capital, and this was mentioned in Lady Clinton's opening speech.

=== Closure ===
In 1992, the hospital closed, with the services moved to a unit at the newly built Royal Devon and Exeter Hospital Wonford site.

=== Subsequent use ===
After a period of vacancy, the University of Exeter used the building. In 2001, following a refurbishment, the building was opened as the Hotel Barcelona. It has subsequently remained a hotel, and been the Magdalen Chapter Hotel, before becoming the Hotel du Vin.
