= Wonford =

Human settlement in Devon, England

Coordinates: 50°43′N 3°30′W

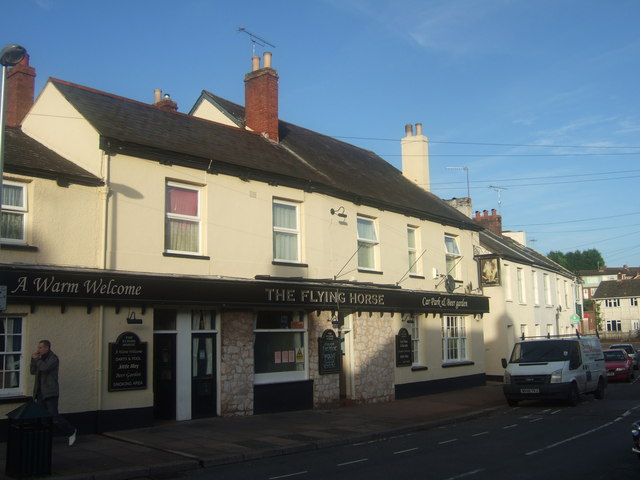
The Flying Horse Inn, Wonford

Wonford is a former village, manor and ecclesiastical parish in Devon, England, now a part of the City of Exeter. The 13th century St Loye's Chapel situated within the parish now gives its name to the surrounding location. Wonford is situated next to the former parish of Heavitree, now both covered by the suburbs of Exeter.

== History ==
Originally, Wonford was a royal estate named after a stream (now called the Northbrook) that rose on the southern slopes of Stoke Hill and flowed through Northbrook Park. In 937 the name was wynford meaning "fair stream". The land surrounding Exeter had been part of the estates of the Celtic kings from before the Roman occupation and in the 7th century these lands continued to be a large royal estate of the Saxon Kings. These lands were gradually reduced in size, until the only remaining hunting ground remaining at the Norman Conquest of England in 1066 was Duryard, north of the city. Historically it was part of Wonford Hundred, as was Exeter itself.

Although St Michael's Church in Heavitree is Victorian, it stands on the place of one of the oldest churches outside Exeter. The Wessex King Cenwealh, established a chapel at this position near the sacred head tree in Wonford in about 660. The area became known as Heavitree, and Wonford shrank as Heavitree grew.

Exeter's main hospital, the Royal Devon and Exeter, is situated in Wonford. Wonford had a population of 7,686 in 2011, taking almost all of the Priory ward and the western edge of the St Loyes ward. Wonford is situated in a large area of Exeter which remains unserved by rail which means all public transport in the area is bus based.

It is now home to one of Exeter's council estates.

== St Loye's Chapel ==
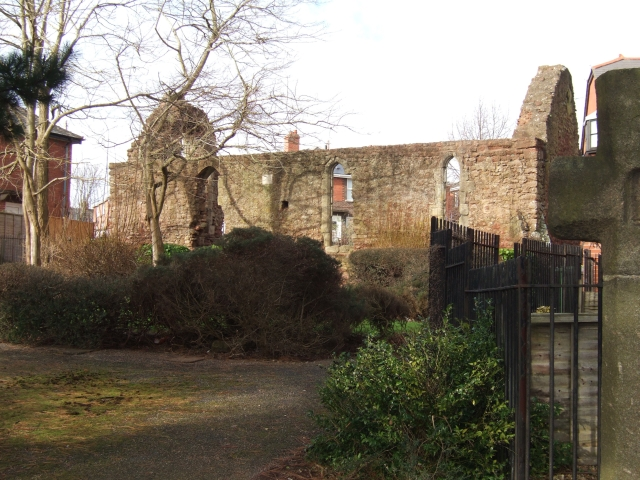
Ruins of St Loye's Chapel

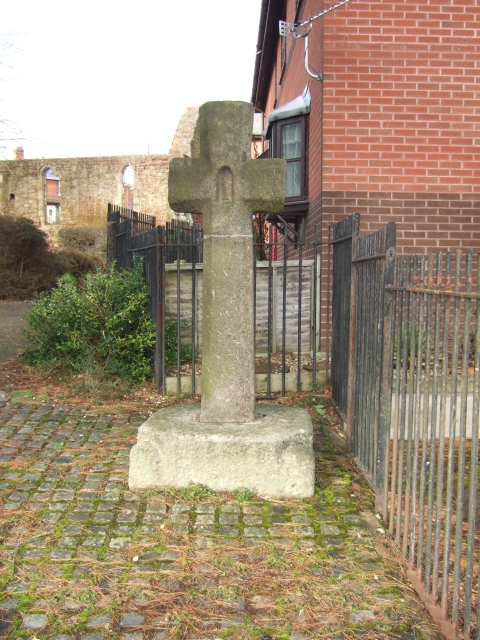
Stone cross at entrance to area of St Loyes Chapel

In about 1238 a chapel dedicated to St Loye (St Elegius) was erected in East Wonford, probably as the domestic chapel of Walter Gervais (fl.1218), Mayor of Exeter and founder of the Exe Bridge. Roger Ayshford of Aysheford in Burlescombe, Devon, acquired (by means unknown) the messuage and lands called "Sancte Loyes", and sold it to John Leigh and William Glandfeilde, who in 1588 sold it for £38 to twelve trustees for the use of the poor of the adjoining parish of Heavitree. The chapel was partially repaired in 1785, before which it had been used as a cow-shed. Ruins survive today of the structure measuring 35 ft by 18 ft 8 inches, surrounded by a lawned area, at the entrance to which stands a stone cross. On the south side there are three Lancet windows, in the west wall is a pointed two light window and in the east end gable is a quatrefoil window. The Chapel of St Loye gives its name to the present St Loye's School of Health Studies, located in the vicinity.
