= Wonford House Hospital =

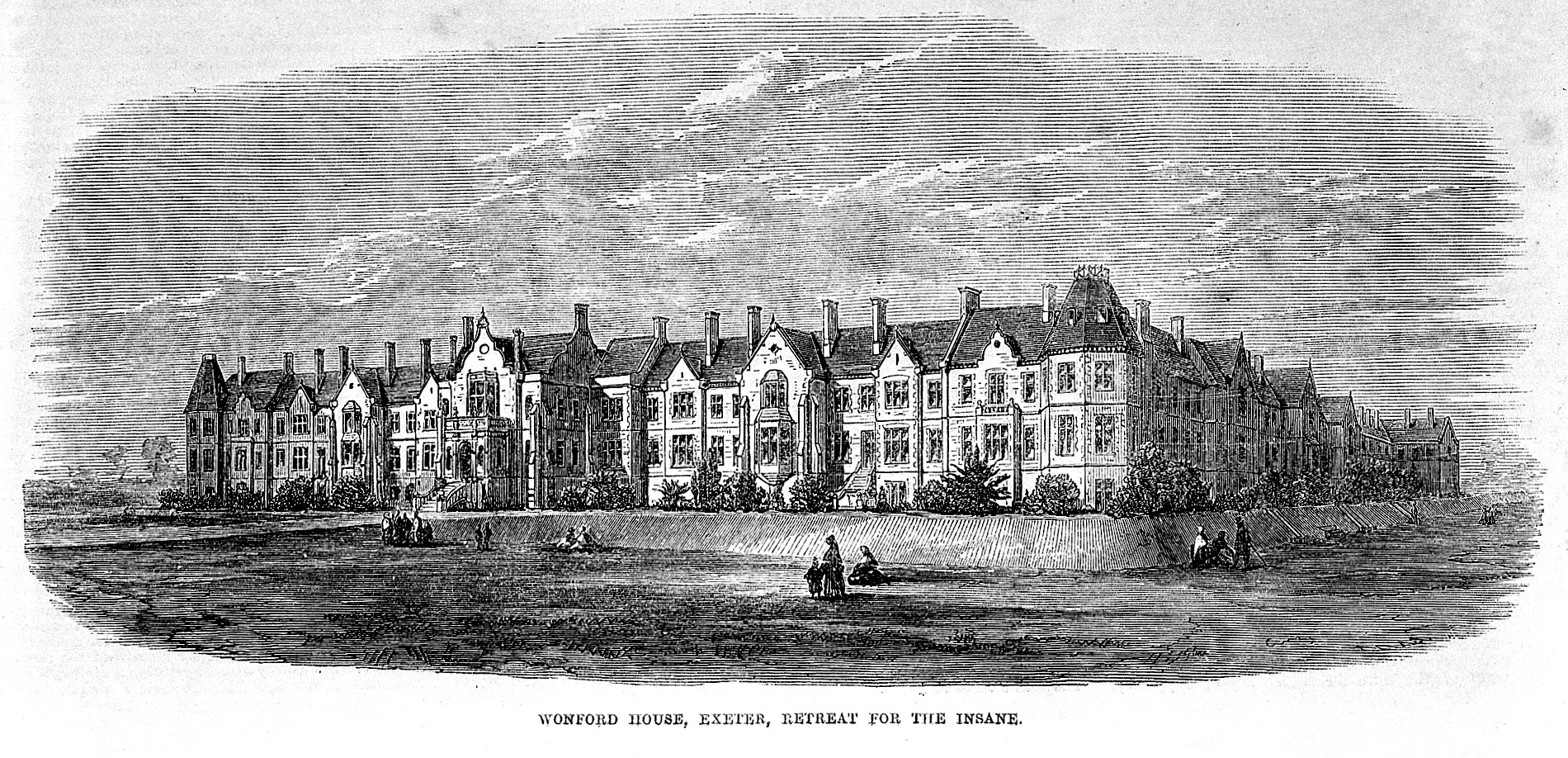
- Illustration of the hospital from 1870

- Shown in Devon

Geography
- Location: Wonford, Exeter, Devon, England, United Kingdom
- Coordinates: 50.7150°N 3.5063°W

Organisation
- Care system: Public NHS
- Type: Specialty

History
- Founded: 1869

Links
- Lists: Hospitals in England

Wonford House Hospital, also previously known as the Wonford House Asylum and Exe Vale Hospital is a building built as an 'asylum for lunatics', and which has continued to provide mental health care, now being the headquarters building of the Devon Partnership NHS Trust, and housing a number of mental health units in the grounds.

== History ==
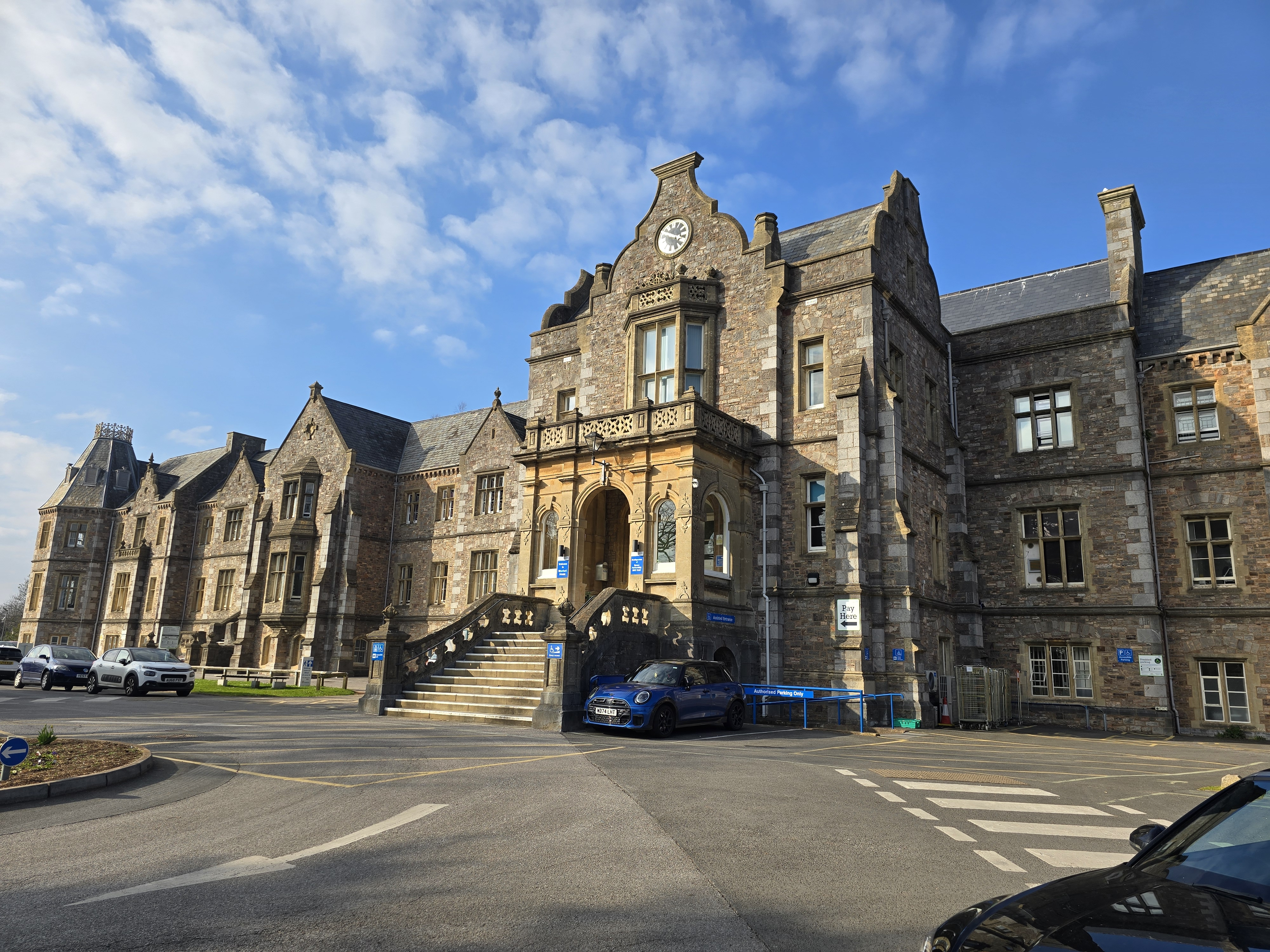
Wonford House Hospital in 2025

The Metropolitan Commissioners in Lunacy made a report in 1842 that the City of Exeter Lunatic Asylum was in need of additional facilities. Rather than expanding the existing site, the commissioners purchased around 20 acres of land in Heavitree for a new building.

The foundation stone for the new hospital was laid on 18 October 1866, and was opened on 7 July 1869 by William Reginald Courtenay, 11th Earl of Devon, Earl of Devon and the Mayor of Exeter.

== Services ==
The main house is now the headquarters of the Devon Partnership NHS Trust, which provides mental health services across Devon.

In the grounds of the house is Devon's only Psychiatric Intensive Care Unit (PICU), the Junipers, which opened in 2019, with 10 beds.
