= Duryard =

Area of Exeter, Devon, England

Duryard: Duryard and St James
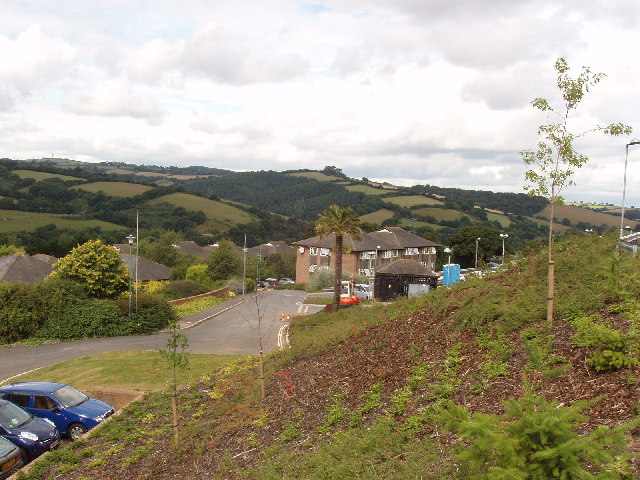
- Streatham Campus, University of Exeter showing part of Duryard

- Duryard and St James district ward in Exeter

- Location within the United Kingdom
- Area: 4.55 km^{2} (1.76 sq mi)
- Population: 11,883 (2011 census)
  - Density: 2,612/km^{2} (6,770/sq mi)
- Shire county: Devon
- Country: England
- Sovereign state: United Kingdom
- Post town: EX4
- Postcode district: EX

Duryard is an ancient area of Exeter in Devon, England. Duryard was once the hunting land of the Anglo-Saxon kings. The name comes from the Anglo-Saxon dear (deer) and geard (fold). Today, much of the area is occupied by the University of Exeter, which has a hall of residence named Duryard.
