= Whipton Hospital =

- Shown in Devon

Geography
- Location: Exeter, Devon, England, United Kingdom
- Coordinates: 50.7313°N 3.4827°W

Organisation
- Care system: Public NHS
- Type: Specialist

Services
- Speciality: Isolation hospital

History
- Founded: 1913

Links
- Lists: Hospitals in England

Whipton Hospital is a small community hospital, also known as the Exeter Community Hospital (Whipton). It was founded as the Whipton Isolation Hospital in 1913 as a pulmonary tuberculosis sanatorium as part of a network of such facilities, instigated by the Public Health (Tuberculosis Regulations) 1912.

The hospital now offers satellite services for a number of local healthcare organisations including the Royal Devon University Healthcare NHS Foundation Trust and the Devon Partnership NHS Trust.

== History ==
The foundation stone of the hospital was laid on 3 July 1913 by the Senior Medical Officer of Exeter, Mr EA Brash.

It was located only a few hundred metres West of the Heavitree isolation hospital (now the Ellen Tinkham School), and approximately the same distance East of the Honeylands Children's Sanatorium.

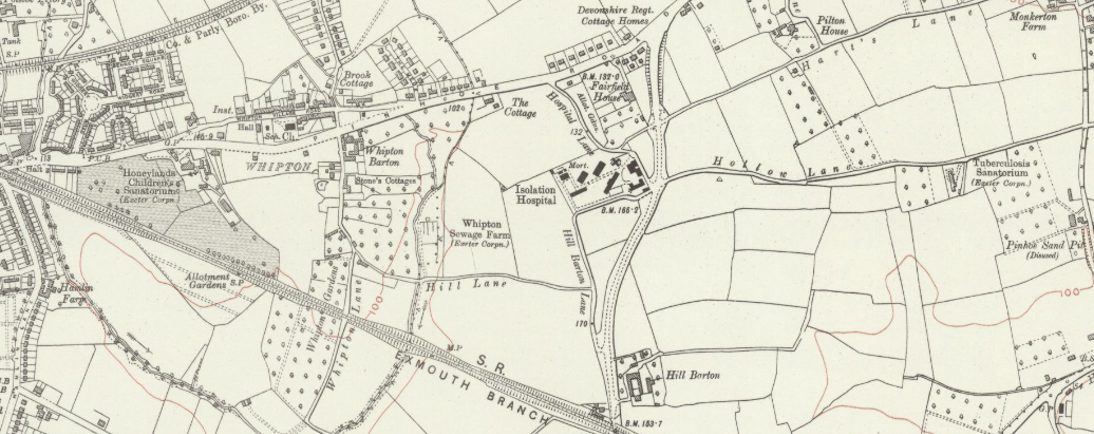
Map showing the three sanatoria located in the Whipton area of Exeter, with Whipton Hospital in the centre marked "Isolation Hospital", Honeylands to the west (left) and Heavitree isolation hospital to the East (right)

The hospital joined the NHS in 1948, and along with the larger Hawkmoor Hospital near Bovey Tracey, as well as the nearby children's Honeylands and the City Tuberculosis Dispensary in the city centre, Whipton formed part of the Exeter Special Hospital Management Committee.
