= Oakmere hill fort =

Iron Age hillfort in Cheshire, England

- Location within Cheshire

General information
- Architectural style: Iron Age hill fort
- Location: England
- Coordinates: 53.206022°N 2.635518°W

Technical details
- Size: 2.25 acres (9,100 m^{2}) interior 3.5 acres (14,000 m^{2}) including defences

Oakmere hill fort is an Iron Age hill fort, one of many large fortified settlements constructed across Britain during the Iron Age, but one of only seven in the county of Cheshire in northern England. It is protected as a Scheduled Ancient Monument. Despite being a low-lying site, Oakmere is still considered a hill fort.

== Background ==
Hill forts developed in the Late Bronze and Early Iron Age, roughly the start of the first millennium BC. The reason for their emergence in Britain, and their purpose, has been a subject of debate. It has been argued that they could have been military sites constructed in response to invasion from continental Europe, sites built by invaders, or a military reaction to social tensions caused by an increasing population and consequent pressure on agriculture. The dominant view since the 1960s has been that the increasing use of iron led to social changes in Britain. Deposits of iron ore were located in different places to the tin and copper ore necessary to make bronze, and as a result trading patterns shifted and the old elites lost their economic and social status. Power passed into the hands of a new group of people. Archaeologist Barry Cunliffe believes that population increase still played a role and has stated that "[the forts] provided defensive possibilities for the community at those times when the stress [of an increasing population] burst out into open warfare. But I wouldn't see them as having been built because there was a state of war. They would be functional as defensive strongholds when there were tensions and undoubtedly some of them were attacked and destroyed, but this was not the only, or even the most significant, factor in their construction".

== Location and layout ==
Although there are over 1,300 hill forts in England, they are concentrated in the south of the country, with only seven in Cheshire. There are two groups of hill forts in the county, each with three members (Maiden Castle is on its own in the south); Oakmere hill fort is in the southern group with Eddisbury hill fort and Kelsborrow Castle. Located at grid reference SJ576678, Oakmere, in common with all of the hill forts in Cheshire, sits on part of the central ridge that runs north–south through the county. A low-lying site, Oakmere hill fort is on a triangular area of land projecting into a mere, also called Oakmere.

Today, the waters of the mere are 10 ft (3.0 m) below the defences at the south-western end of the site, with a 35 ft (11 m) gap between the edge of the mere and the defences; however when the hill fort was built the water-level would have been higher and closer to the scarp, offering the site natural defences. Ramparts were thrown up around the south-west and north sides of the site, creating an arc, and a ditch was created in front of the rampart. The bank survives to a height of 6 ft (1.8 m) and, at its deepest point, the ditch is now 6 ft (1.8 m) deep although it was originally 10 ft (3.0 m) deep; the distance between the inner edge of the bank and the outer edge of the ditch is 100 ft (30 m). The depth of the ditch is not uniform, indicating that either the hill fort was unfinished or perhaps bearing testament to an attempt by the inhabitants of Oakmere hill fort to re-excavate and deepen the ditch. The entrance to the site was in the southern end of the defences and is similar to the entrances of Bradley, Helsby, and Kelsborrow hill forts.

== History ==
In 1960, Oakmere hill fort was excavated by archaeologist James Forde-Johnston; the excavation focused on the site's southern defences and showed that the ditch was 50 ft (15 m) wide at its zenith and originally 10 ft (3.0 m) deep in places. The site has been disturbed and there are two modern breaks in the defences. The structure was made a Scheduled Ancient Monument in 1995, giving Oakmere protection against unauthorised change.

== See also ==
- Scheduled Monuments in Cheshire (pre-1066)
