= Bradley hill fort =

Iron Age hillfort in Cheshire, England

- Location within Cheshire

General information
- Architectural style: Iron Age hillfort
- Location: England
- Coordinates: 53.286607°N 2.692214°W

Technical details
- Size: 1.5 acres (6,100 m^{2}) interior 2 acres (8,100 m^{2}) including defences

Bradley hill fort is an Iron Age hill fort. Hill forts were fortified hill-tops, used as settlements or temporary refuges, constructed across Britain during the Iron Age. It is the smallest of the seven hill forts in the county of Cheshire in northern England. It is protected as a Scheduled Ancient Monument.

== Background ==
Hill forts developed in the Late Bronze and Early Iron Age, roughly the start of the first millennium BC. The reason for their emergence in Britain, and their purpose, has been a subject of debate. It has been argued that they could have been military sites constructed in response to invasion from continental Europe, sites built by invaders, or a military reaction to social tensions caused by an increasing population and consequent pressure on agriculture. The dominant view since the 1960s has been that the increasing use of iron led to social changes in Britain. Deposits of iron ore were located in different places to the tin and copper ore necessary to make bronze, and as a result trading patterns shifted and the old elites lost their economic and social status. Power passed into the hands of a new group of people. Archaeologist Barry Cunliffe believes that population increase still played a role and has stated "[the forts] provided defensive possibilities for the community at those times when the stress [of an increasing population] burst out into open warfare. But I wouldn't see them as having been built because there was a state of war. They would be functional as defensive strongholds when there were tensions and undoubtedly some of them were attacked and destroyed, but this was not the only, or even the most significant, factor in their construction".

== Location ==
Although there are over 1,300 hill forts in England, they are concentrated in the south of the country, with only seven in Cheshire. There are two groups of hill forts in the county, each with three members (Maiden Castle is on its own in the south); Bradley hill fort is the furthest north of the Cheshire hill forts and is close to Helsby and Woodhouses hill forts, both west of the site. Located at grid reference SJ539768, Bradley lies on the central ridge that runs north–south through the county, as do all of the hill forts in Cheshire.

Bradley hill fort is surrounded on most sides by higher ground, so whereas other hill forts on the Cheshire central ridge command views of the Cheshire Plain, Bradley's views are restricted. A tributary of the River Weaver runs east–west past the north of the site, and the fort was positioned to exploit the stream's steep banks for defence.

== Layout ==
Covering about 2 acres (8,100 m^{2}), with an enclosed area of about 1.5 acres (6,100 m^{2}), Bradley is the smallest hill fort in Cheshire. The site was defended by a single bank and ditch, 75 to 80 ft (23 to 24 m) wide from the back of the bank to the outer edge of the ditch. The entrance was probably in the north-east corner where the artificial defences meet the river bank, similar to the entrance of Oakmere hill fort. The position is uncertain as the area has been damaged by ploughing and the addition of modern drainage ditches, obscuring the original features. The site has not been investigated archaeologically.

== See also ==
- Scheduled Monuments in Cheshire (pre-1066)
