= W. J. Varley =

British geographer and archaeologist (1904–1976)

William Jones Varley, FSA (1904–1976) was a British geographer and archaeologist, particularly known for his excavations of English Iron Age hillforts, including Maiden Castle and Eddisbury hillfort in Cheshire, Old Oswestry hillfort in Shropshire, and Castle Hill in West Yorkshire. He was also a pioneer of geographical research and education in colonial Ghana where he worked from 1947 to 1956, and was involved in historical conservation there.

== Education and career ==
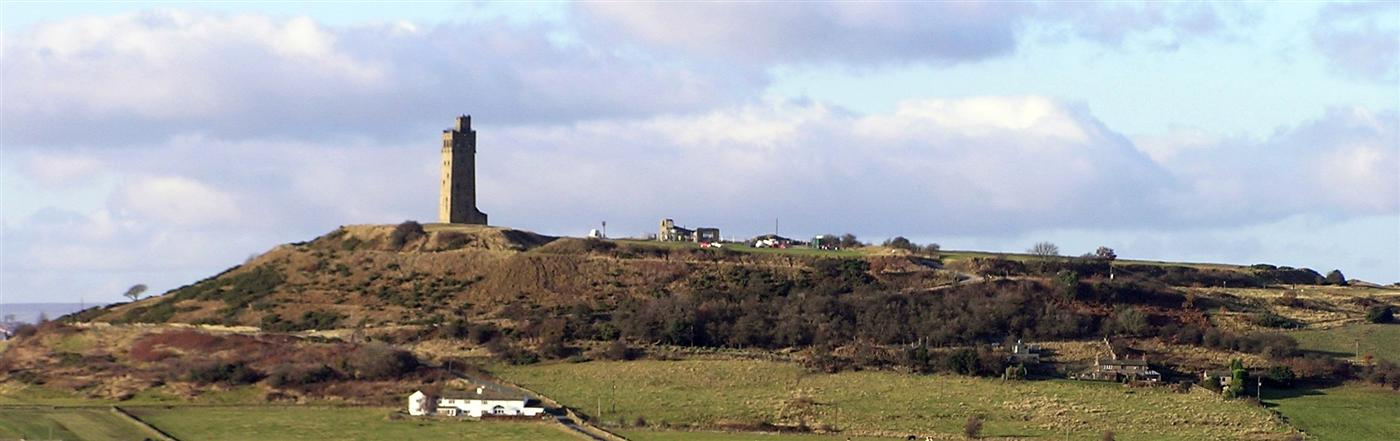
Castle Hill, Almondbury

Varley was born in 1904, near Castle Hill, Almondbury, West Yorkshire. He attended the University College of Wales, Aberystwyth (now Aberystwyth University) in the mid-1920s, where he was taught by the geographer, H. J. Fleure (1877–1969). In any early paper he acknowledged the influence of a 1917 paper on "valleyward movement" of population by Fleure and W. E. Whitehouse. (Note: Actually 1916)

Varley lectured in geography at the University of Liverpool in the 1930s, where his notable students included Margaret Jones née Owen (1916–2001). Owen and Tom Jones, later her husband, participated in several of Varley's excavations during the 1930s. (Note: For example, the Bleasdale Circle and Eddisbury hillfort) After his National Service in World War II, Varley left the university in January 1946. He worked in Ghana (then the Gold Coast) from 1947 to 1956, where he was professor of geography at the newly founded University College of the Gold Coast (now the University of Ghana), then based at Achimota. Around 1960 he took up a post with Cyril Bibby at Hull Teacher Training College.

== Excavations ==
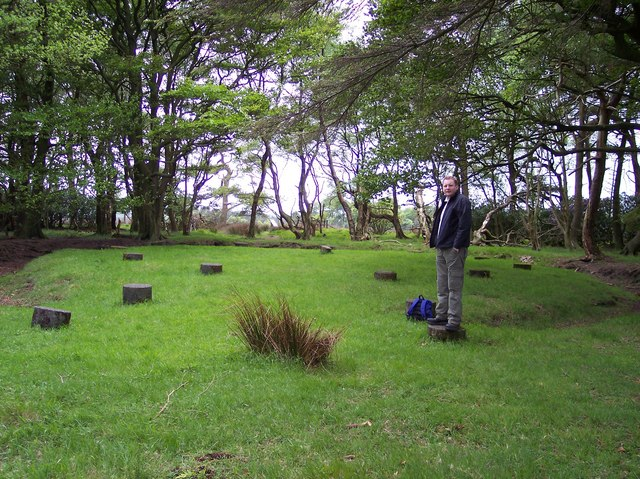
Bleasdale Circle

In 1932, Varley worked under V. Gordon Childe at the Old Kieg Stone Circle, near Alford, Aberdeenshire, Scotland – an example of a recumbent stone circle, with a large recumbent stone between two standing pillars – carrying out surveying and assisting with the preliminary excavation.

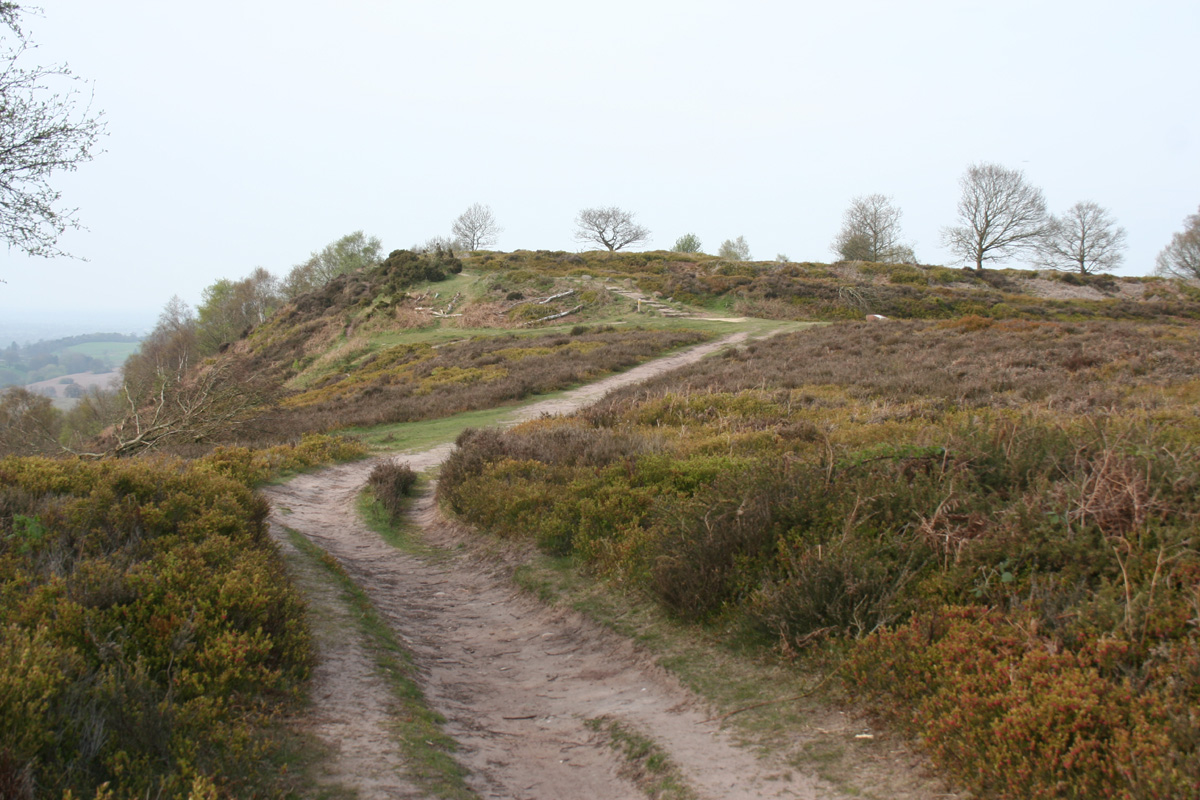
Maiden Castle on the summit of Bickerton Hill

One of his early independent excavations was carried out between 1933 and 1935 at the Bronze Age Bleasdale Circle, near Bleasdale, Lancashire, now considered to be an urnfield with a mound ringed by oak posts and enclosed in a palisade. Bleasdale was then the only known timber circle where any of the wood had survived. (Note: Other examples have subsequently been discovered, including two circles at a site known as "Seahenge".) An earlier partial investigation of the site had been carried out in 1898–1900, (Note: Excavated by Thomas Kelsall and Shadrach Jackson; reported by William Boyd Dawkins) but Varley was the first to investigate the outer palisade and the larger area it enclosed. He classified the site as a palisade-barrow, similar to the Dutch examples at Calais Wold and Langedijk, but stressed its unique layout. At the time of his excavation, the site was partially reconstructed using concrete posts, and four surviving oak posts were moved to Harris Museum, Preston, which still has a permanent exhibit on the site and the two excavations.

=== The Cheshire hillforts ===
In the early 1930s, at the suggestion of C. F. C. Hawkes, Varley turned his attention to the hillforts of Cheshire. His excavation of Maiden Castle on Bickerton Hill was his first on a hillfort, and the first to be carried out by an archaeologist on any hillfort in the county. (Note: Garner notes that several urns containing bones were discovered in a sand-pit near Eddisbury hillfort by quarry workers in 1851.) He started to excavate in 1932, aided by a group of his students from the University of Liverpool, but the main excavations of 1934 and 1935, supervised by Varley with J. P. Droop, were carried out under the "Bickerton Camp Scheme", which recruited an assortment of volunteers including unemployed Liverpudlians, school children and members of the Liverpool Ramblers' Association. The investigation concentrated on the hillfort's inturned entrance, where post-holes were found, suggested to be gateposts. Trenches were also cut through the double ramparts. The inner ramparts were found to consist of sand and carbonised oak timbers protected by a stone cap and revetments (retaining walls), which Varley compared with the murus gallicus method of construction, typical of Gaul. An outer revetment protected the outer ramparts, which had an internal line of turf, suggesting the possibility of multiple phases of construction. Varley described Maiden Castle as a promontory camp; he initially concluded that it dated from around 0–50 AD and had subsequently been strengthened in around 50 AD when Roman expansion began to threaten the area. By 1940, he had revised these dates substantially earlier, concluding that the hillfort was built in the 2nd century BC and had been strengthened in the 1st century BC; modern radiocarbon dating moves the dates earlier still. A contemporary review of his 1937 paper on the excavation describes it as "a valuable review of the problems of the life of Britain in the few centuries before the Roman conquest." Modern archaeologists Richard Mason and Rachel Pope describe his reports on Maiden Castle as showing "fairly meticulous archaeological reasoning".

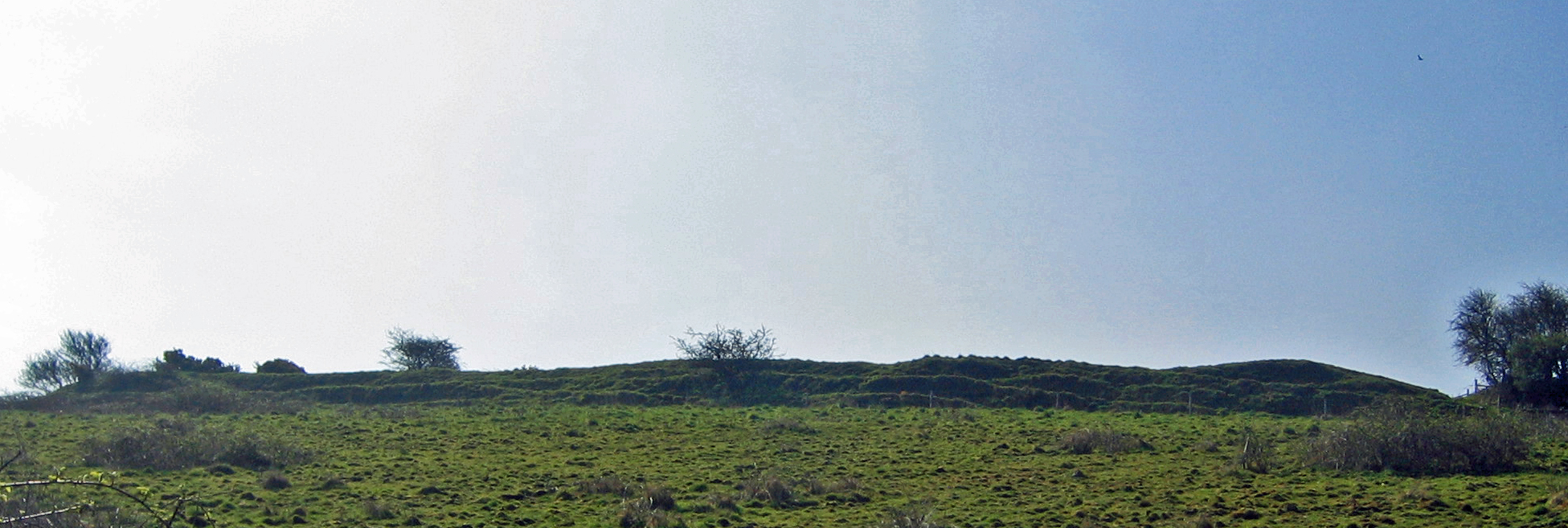
Eddisbury hillfort

Varley declared the Bickerton Camp Scheme "a success, scientifically and socially", and he continued to employ volunteers under the scheme – mainly unemployed Liverpool dock workers – in his excavation of the much larger and more complex Eddisbury hillfort, on Eddisbury Hill near Delamere, which was carried out during the summers of 1936, 1937 and 1938. The investigation was hampered by part of the area being under cultivation with crops. Four major and seven minor trenches were dug, with investigations focusing on two potential entrances, a junction between parts of the earthworks, and the area known as Merrick's Hill, where buildings were visible at the surface. His interpretation of the excavation's results involved a complex construction history in several phases from c. 400–250 BC to the Anglo-Saxon period, with subsequent occupation extending into the post-medieval period. Some of his finds at Eddisbury, together with a model of his excavations, were displayed in the Department of British and Medieval Antiquities of the British Museum in 1937, but the Second World War and Varley's move to Ghana delayed publication of the results; the full report did not appear until 1950 and has significant problems, including lacking illustrations of his finds. Mason and Pope speculate that many of Varley's site records might have been lost during the war and that the 1950 paper might have been based partly on memory.

Dan Garner has suggested that Varley might have started a preliminary excavation at Kelsborrow hillfort in April 1938, but any plans to excavate other Cheshire hillforts were presumably interrupted by the outbreak of the Second World War. All of the finds from his excavations of Maiden Castle and Eddisbury were long believed lost.

=== Other hillforts ===
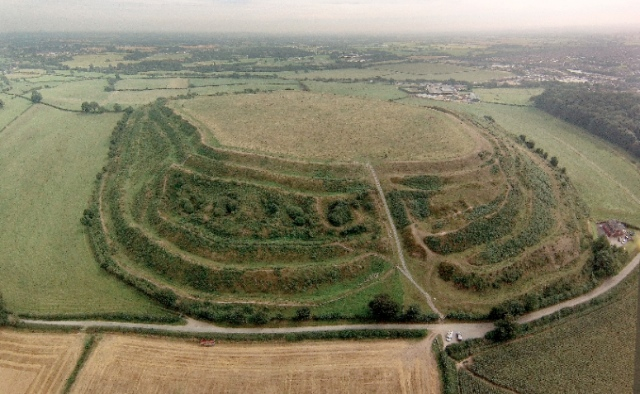
Old Oswestry hillfort

Varley excavated the Iron Age hillfort at Castle Hill, Almondbury, near Huddersfield, West Yorkshire, over six seasons in 1939, 1946–47, 1969–70 and 1972. This work included trenches cutting through the fort's ramparts, as well as studies of its entrances and the interior. Varley's death meant that his results were never published in full, but some of his finds, together with a model of the hillfort, are on permanent display at Huddersfield's Tolson Museum, which also holds many of his records from the Castle Hill site.

He also excavated Old Oswestry hillfort, Shropshire, in 1939 and 1940 with Bryan H. St J. O'Neil, who also independently excavated three other hillforts in the Welsh Marches during the 1930s. Varley never finished the excavation and his full report failed to appear in his lifetime, being published by Gwilym Hughes in 1996, twenty years after his death.

=== Later excavations ===
His later publications include work on Wat's Dyke at Mynydd Isa in Wales, and Barmston and Holderness crannogs, Giants Hill, Swine, and Woodhall Manor, Beverley in East Yorkshire.

=== Methods and modern appraisal ===
Varley's work at Eddisbury, and elsewhere, was supervised by a group including both men and women, among whom was his first wife, Joan Varley. This was typical of excavations of the time, including those done by the Wheelers and the Bersus. An appraisal of their excavation work at Eddisbury by Mason and Pope in 2016 describes the Varleys as being "at the very forefront of the field in 1930s Britain" and "fairly exemplary for their time ... cutting-edge even", employing "a fairly methodical approach" to excavation. Their methods were transitional between 19th-century archaeology and more-modern techniques; they began using a "wall-chasing" approach that resembles the "chase-and-clear" methods of the late 19th century, but later progressed to excavating a general area, an approach similar to modern methods that was novel at the time. They backfilled all their trenches at the end of each season of work. Varley's interpretation of the results, however, paid too much attention to historical events, leading to inaccuracies. An appraisal of his Old Oswestry ceramic finds by Elaine Morris in 1996 concluded that his team's dating of pottery was incorrect.

== Writing and educational work ==
Varley co-wrote the textbook The Geography of Ghana (1958) with his former colleague from the University College of the Gold Coast, H. P. White. Although primarily aimed at secondary-school education in West Africa, contemporary reviews suggested that it was suitable for a broader audience. It included fieldwork by the authors. Robert W. Steel, in a review for African Affairs, describes it as "a most useful survey" and "an example both of what observant geographers can write and of what the publishers that are alive to the educational needs of Africa today can produce." The reviewer for Geography praises Varley's "unusual approach to the physical basis" as "both stimulating and unconventional." L. Gray Cowan, in a broadly positive review for Geographical Review, criticises the over-generalised nature of the book's conclusions.

He also wrote two books on the prehistory of the county of Cheshire. Prehistoric Cheshire (1940), co-authored with John Wilfrid Jackson, contains then-unpublished material on Eddisbury hillfort as well as Varley's reappraisal of his earlier Maiden Castle work. A reviewer for Geography praises the book's originality and describes it as "a model study of its type" that serves as "a brilliant introduction" to studies of the period. The book's blocks and types were destroyed by German bombing. His later work, Cheshire Before the Romans (1964), although intended as an updated replacement for the 1940 book, broadened its focus to review the whole of the UK and in particular his hillfort excavations in other counties. It was described as "wide ranging, highly intricate, specialist, and often controversial" in a generally critical contemporary review by T. G. E. Powell, and was criticised by Victoria B. Morgan and Paul E. Morgan in their 2004 book on the topic.

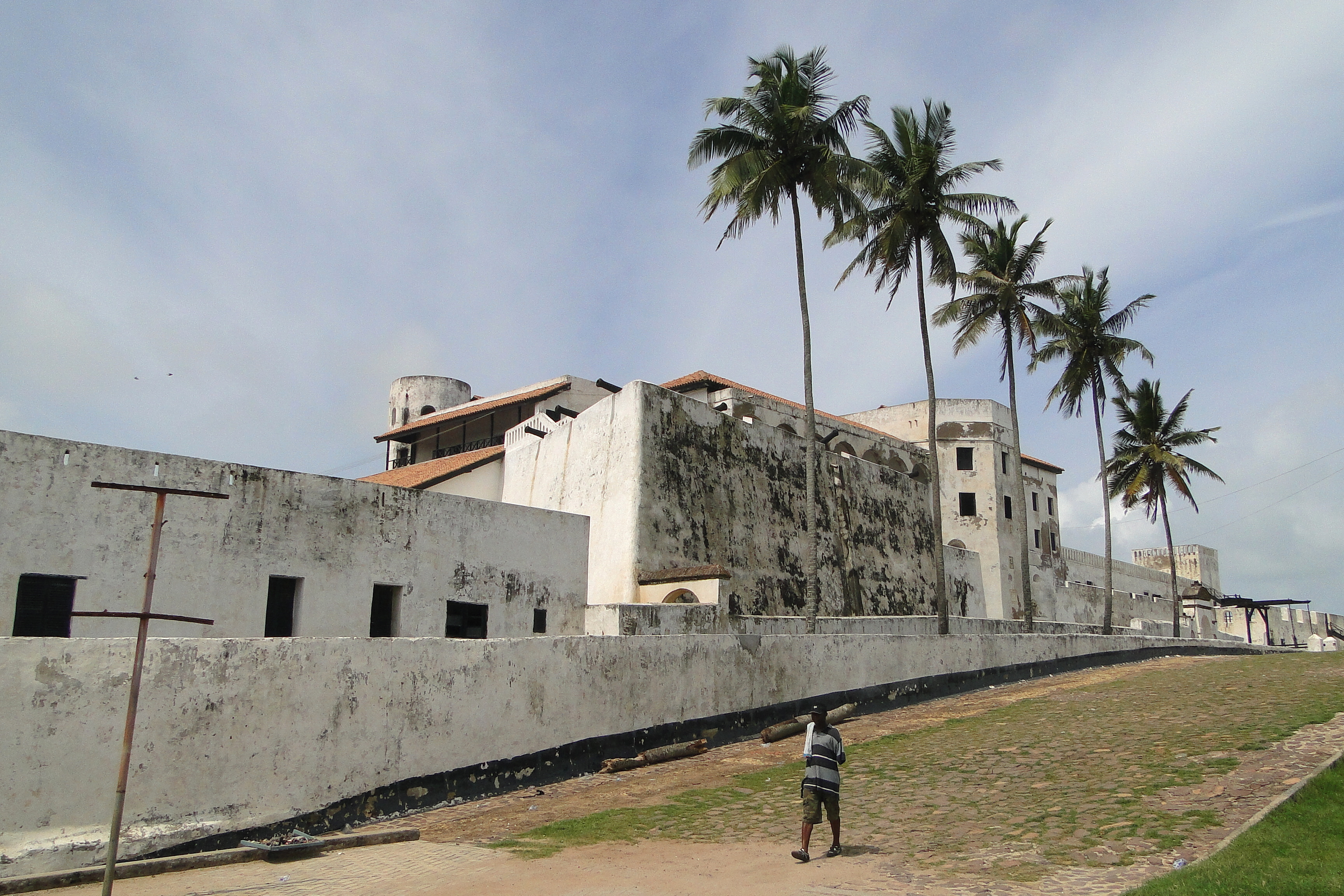
Elmina Castle, one of the Ghanaian forts that W. J. Varley surveyed and Mary Varley photographed

Varley's archaeological interests were not exclusively prehistoric. During his time in Ghana, he published a survey of the country's castles and forts, constructed by European colonists between the 15th and 18th centuries; it was the first paper to appear in the journal of the Gold Coast & Togoland Historical Society.

He was interested in disseminating archaeological knowledge to the public.

== Personal life ==
His first wife was the archaeologist Joan Varley. She worked under Varley in several of his excavations during the 1930s and in particular was named by him as one of the directors of the excavation at Eddisbury; one modern reappraisal of this work credits her as the co-director with him. She specialised in the history of Delamere Forest. During the 1930s, Varley coached the University of Liverpool rowing eights.

He later married Mary Varley (1910–2006), a teacher, photographer and artist from near Halifax, West Yorkshire, whom he met while she was teaching at Coleg Harlech, Wales, having been evacuated there in 1940. When the couple moved to Ghana after the war, Mary Varley managed the University Photographic Unit in Accra, and she also took photographs to illustrate Varley's work. On their return to England, they briefly lived in Kingston upon Hull, East Yorkshire. By 1961, they had settled in Beverley, East Yorkshire, where Varley died early in 1976. His large collection of papers and artefacts were handled after his death by Adrian Havercroft, an archaeologist and family friend.

== Societies and fellowships ==
He was an elected fellow of the Society of Antiquaries of London and the Royal Anthropological Institute of Great Britain and Ireland. He served as secretary of the Monuments and Relics Commission of the Gold Coast in 1951 (subsequently part of the Ghana Museums and Monuments Board), and was the inaugural president of the Gold Coast Geographical Association, founded in 1955 to promote the study of West African geography.

== Selected publications ==
Research papers and reports

- W. J. Varley (1976), "A summary of the excavations at Castle Hill, Almondbury 1939–1972", in D. W. Harding (ed.), Hillforts: Later Prehistoric Earthworks in Britain and Ireland, Academic Press, pp. 119–31, 402–7, ISBN 978-0-12-324750-6
- W. J. Varley (1952), "The castles and forts of the Gold Coast", Transactions of the Gold Coast & Togoland Historical Society, 1 (1): 1–17, JSTOR 41406421
- W. J. Varley (1950), "Excavations of the castle ditch, Eddisbury, 1935–1938" (PDF), Transactions of the Historic Society of Lancashire and Cheshire, 102: 1–68
- W. J. Varley (1948), "The hill-forts of the Welsh Marches" (PDF), The Archaeological Journal, 105: 41–66, doi:10.1080/00665983.1948.10853932
- W. J. Varley (1938), "The Bleasdale circle", The Antiquaries Journal, 18 (2): 154–171, doi:10.1017/S0003581500007034, S2CID 162348914

Books

- W. J. Varley (1964), Cheshire Before the Romans, Cheshire Community Council
- W. J. Varley; H. P. White (1958), The Geography of Ghana, Longmans, Green
- W. J. Varley; J. W. Jackson (1940), Prehistoric Cheshire, Cheshire Community Council

== Notes and references ==
Sources

- Aubrey Burl (2005), A Guide to the Stone Circles of Britain, Ireland and Brittany, Yale University Press, ISBN 978-0-300-11406-5
- Dan Garner; et al. (2016), Jill Collens (ed.), Hillforts of the Cheshire Ridge, Archaeopress Publishing, ISBN 978-1-78491-467-7

- Dan Garner. "The historical study of the Cheshire Hillforts" (chapter 2), pp. 7–21
- Richard Mason, Rachel Pope. "The Lost Archive of Eddisbury: Rediscovering Finds and Records from the 1936–1938 Varley Excavations" (chapter 4), pp. 29–36
- Dan Garner. "Excavations at Eddisbury Hillfort" (chapter 10), pp. 139–200
- Richard Mason, Rachel Pope. Rescuing a scheduled monument: Recent work at Merrick's Hill, Eddisbury Hillfort (chapter 11), pp. 201–16

- John Shipley (2018), 50 Gems of Shropshire: The History & Heritage of the Most Iconic Places, Amberley Publishing, ISBN 978-1-4456-7820-7
- W. J. Varley (1938), "The Bleasdale circle", The Antiquaries Journal, 18 (2): 154–171, doi:10.1017/S0003581500007034, S2CID 162348914
- W. J. Varley (1948), "The hill-forts of the Welsh Marches" (PDF), The Archaeological Journal, 105: 41–66, doi:10.1080/00665983.1948.10853932
- W. J. Varley (1950), "Excavations of the castle ditch, Eddisbury, 1935–1938" (PDF), Transactions of the Historic Society of Lancashire and Cheshire, 102: 1–68
- W. J. Varley (1964), Cheshire Before the Romans, Cheshire Community Council
