= Eddisbury =

Eddisbury could be

- the Eddisbury (UK Parliament constituency) in Cheshire, England
- the ancient Eddisbury (hundred) in Cheshire
- Eddisbury hill fort in Cheshire
- Baron Eddisbury, a title in the Peerage of the United Kingdom
