= Burton Point, Cheshire =

Coordinates: 53.2548°N 3.0460°W

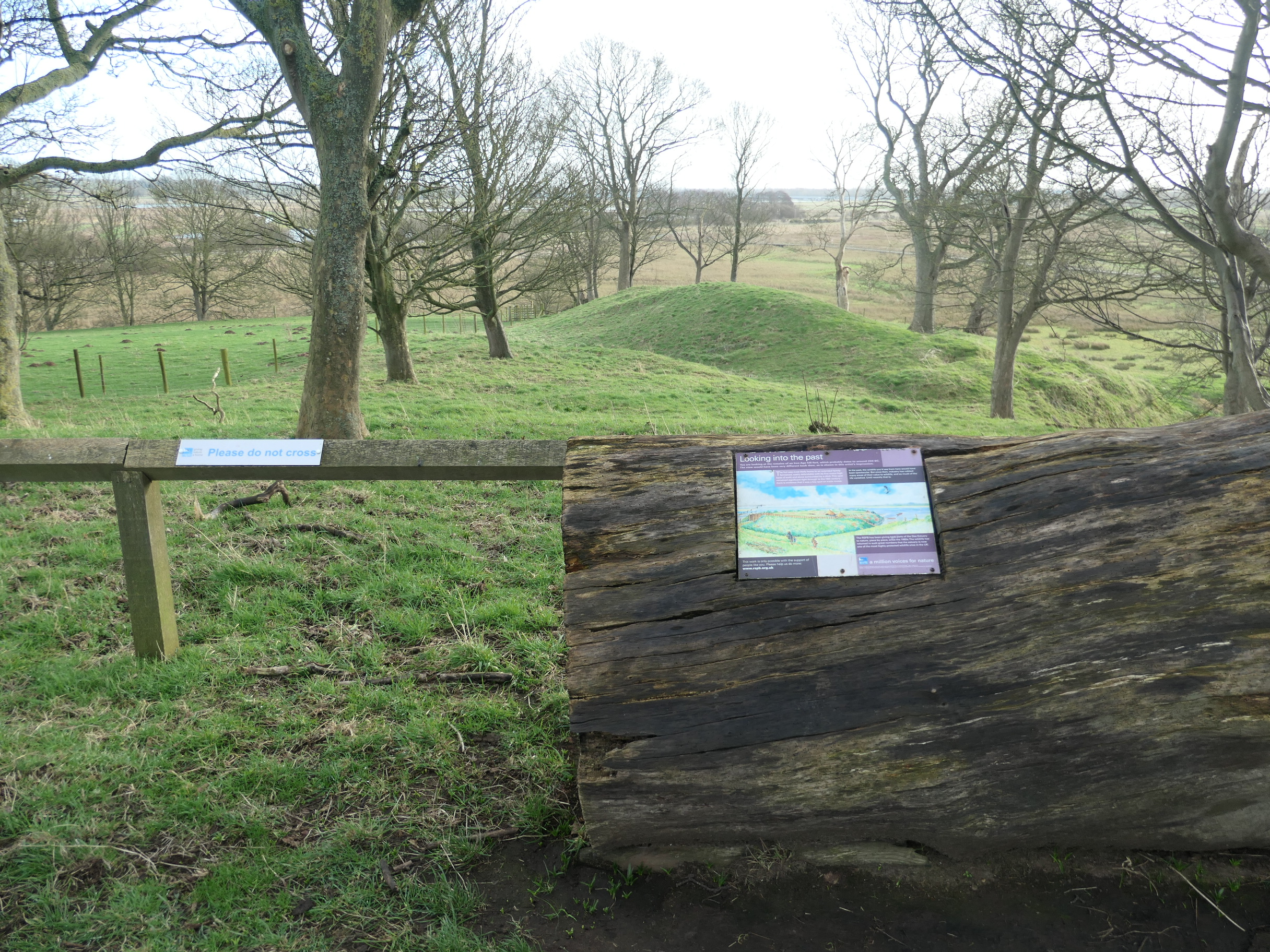
Site with interpretation aids

Burton Point is an Iron Age promontory fort located 1 mile (1.6 km) to the southeast of the village of Burton, on the Wirral Peninsula, Cheshire, England. The site, which overlooks the estuary of the River Dee, consists of tree-covered earthworks in the form of a bank and ditch. The area to the north of which has been quarried for its underlying sandstone. The fort is a scheduled monument. To the south of the fort is a burial site that was excavated in 1878, revealing the remains of between 50 and 60 burials. It is not known whether these are of an early Christian date, or if they are the remains of a local shipwreck in 1637.

The site once formed a promontory on the original course of the River Dee. In the early 18th century, a new channel was constructed on the Welsh side of the estuary to improve navigation to the Port of Chester. This led to the headland becoming landlocked to the reclaimed farmland of Sealand, Flintshire.

== See also ==
- List of Scheduled Monuments in Cheshire dated to before 1066
