= Woodhouse hill fort =

Iron Age hillfort in Cheshire, England

Coordinates: 53.2763°N 2.7361°W

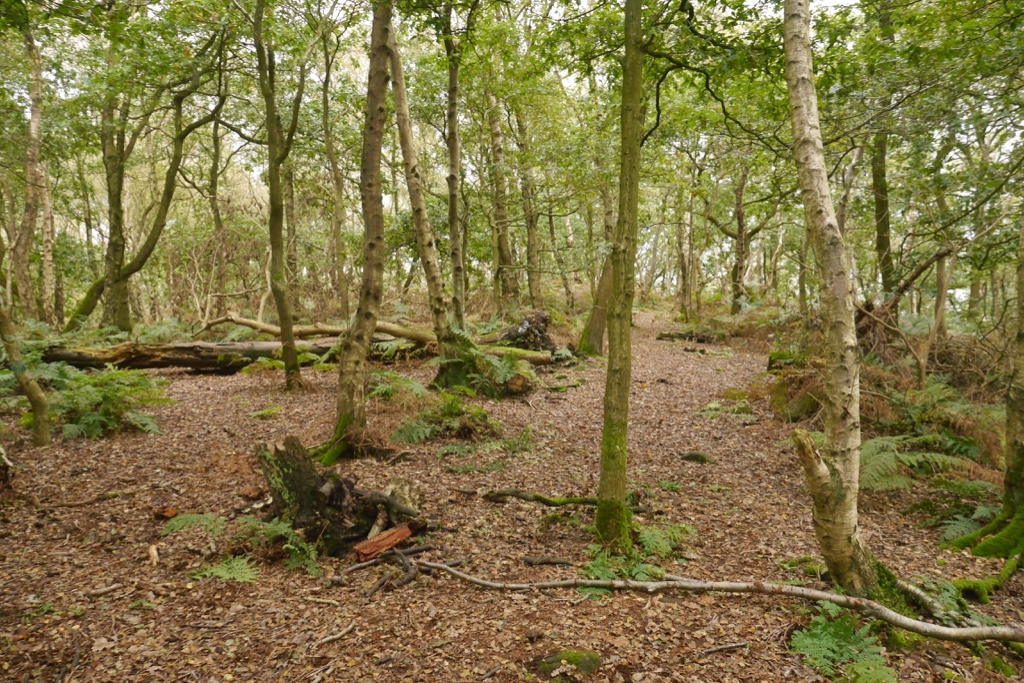
On the summit of Woodhouse Hill

Woodhouse hill fort is an Iron Age hillfort between Frodsham and Helsby in Cheshire, England. It lies at the northern end of the Mid Cheshire Ridge. Woodhouse Hill has steep cliffs on the western sides, providing a natural defence. It is defended by a rampart to the north and east where the ground slopes more gently. Excavations in 1951 showed that the rampart was originally 4m high and revetted with stone on both sides. A number of small rounded stones, believed to be slingstones, have been found on the site. The hill fort is protected as a Scheduled Ancient Monument.

The hill has a summit of 137m AOD. The fort site and the surrounding areas form a part of within Snidley Moor Wood much of which is owned and managed by the Woodland Trust.

== Location ==
The site is to the East of the large village and civil parish of Helsby, in the unitary authority of Cheshire West and Chester and the ceremonial county of Cheshire.

- Map sources for Woodhouse hill fort

== See also ==
- List of Scheduled Monuments in Cheshire dated to before 1066
