= The Bridestones =

Neolithic chambered cairn in Cheshire, England

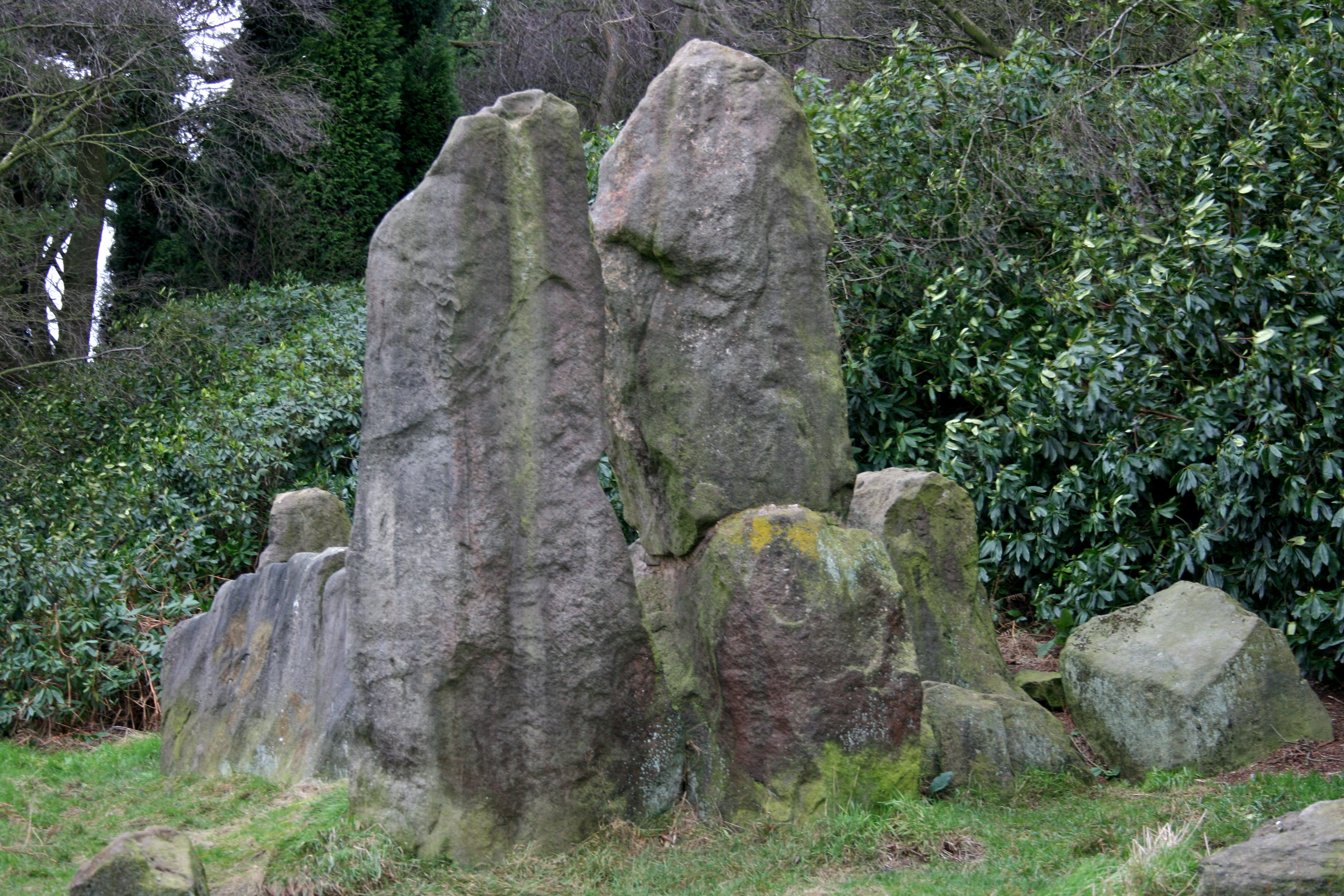
- Interactive map of The Bridestones
- 53°9′24.64″N 2°8′31.3″W
- Type: Chambered cairn
- Periods: Neolithic
- Location: near Congleton
- Region: Cheshire, England

Site notes
- Condition: damaged

The Bridestones is a chambered cairn, near Congleton, Cheshire, England, that was constructed in the Neolithic period about 3500–2400 BC. It was described in 1764 as being 120 yards (110 m) long and 12 yards (11 m) wide, containing three separate compartments, of which only one remains today. The remaining compartment is 6 metres (20 ft) long by 2.7 metres (8.9 ft) wide, and consists of vertical stone slabs, divided by a now-broken cross slab. The cairn originally had a stone circle surrounding it, with four portal stones; two of these portal stones still remain. The site is protected as a scheduled ancient monument.

== Condition in 18th century ==
The state of the site was recorded in the second edition of Henry Rowlands's Mona Antiqua Restaurata (published in 1766), based on a report by Rev. Thomas Malbon, rector of Congleton. As the report describes removal of stones for road-building in 1764 (the Ashbourne–Leek–Congleton Turnpike, now Dial Lane, just south of the site), it appears that it was included by Henry Owen, editor of the second edition, and was not part of Rowlands's original 1723 edition. The report provides a detailed description of the site at the time along with a plate giving a plan of the site.

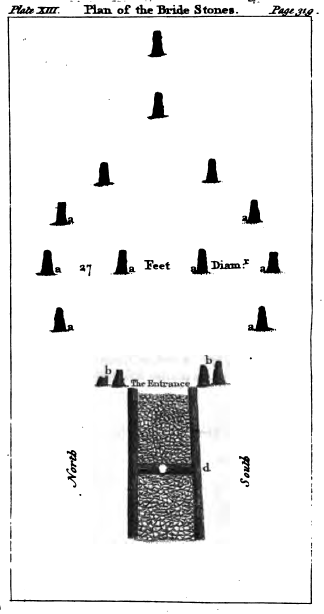
Plan of The Bridestones from the second edition (1766) of Mona Antiqua Restaurata by Henry Rowlands

A A, etc. are six upright free stones, from three to six feet broad, of various heights and shapes, fixed about six feet from each other in a semicircular form, and two within, where the earth is very black, mixed with ashes and oak-charcoal. It is apprehended the circle was originally complete, and twenty-seven feet in diameter; for there is the appearance of holes where stones have been, and also of two single stones, one standing East of the circle, at about five or six yards distance, and the other at the same distance from that.

B B are rough, square tapering stones four feet three inches broad and two feet thick. One on the North side is broken off, as is part of the other.

C C is the pavement of a kind of artificial cave. It is composed of broken pieces of stones about two inches and a half thick, and laid on pounded white stones about six inches deep; two inches of the upper part of which are tinged with black, supposed from ashes falling through the pavement, which was covered with them and oak-charcoal about two inches thick. Several bits of bone were also found, but so small that it could not be discovered whether they were human or not.

The sides of the cave, if I may so call it, were originally composed of two unhewn free stones, about eighteen feet in length, six in height and fourteen inches thick at a medium. Each of them is now broken in two.

D is a partition stone standing across the place, about five feet and a half high, and six inches thick. A circular hole is cut through this stone, about nineteen inches and a half in diameter.

The whole was covered with long, unhewn, large, flat, free stones since taken away. The height of the cave from the pavement to the covering is five feet and ten inches.

The entrance was filled up with free stones and earth, supposed to be dust blown by the wind from year to year in dry weather.

There remains another place of the same construction but smaller and without any inward partition, about fifty-five yards distance from this. It is two yards and a half long, two feet and a half broad and three feet two inches high. There is also part of another.

There was a large heap of stones that covered the whole, a hundred and twenty yards long and twelve yards broad. These stones have been taken away from time to time by masons and other people, for various purposes. And in the year 1764, several hundred loads were carried away for making a turnpike-road about sixty yards from this place, which laid it open for examination.

— Henry Rowlands, Mona Antiqua Restaurata.

== Folklore and naming ==
The origin of the cairn's name is unclear. One legend says that a recently married couple were murdered at the location, and the stones were laid around their grave. Another possibility is that they are named after Brigantia. Alternatively, the Old English word for "birds" was "briddes"; the stones in their original form could have resembled birds, giving rise to "Briddes stones".

== Subsequent destruction ==
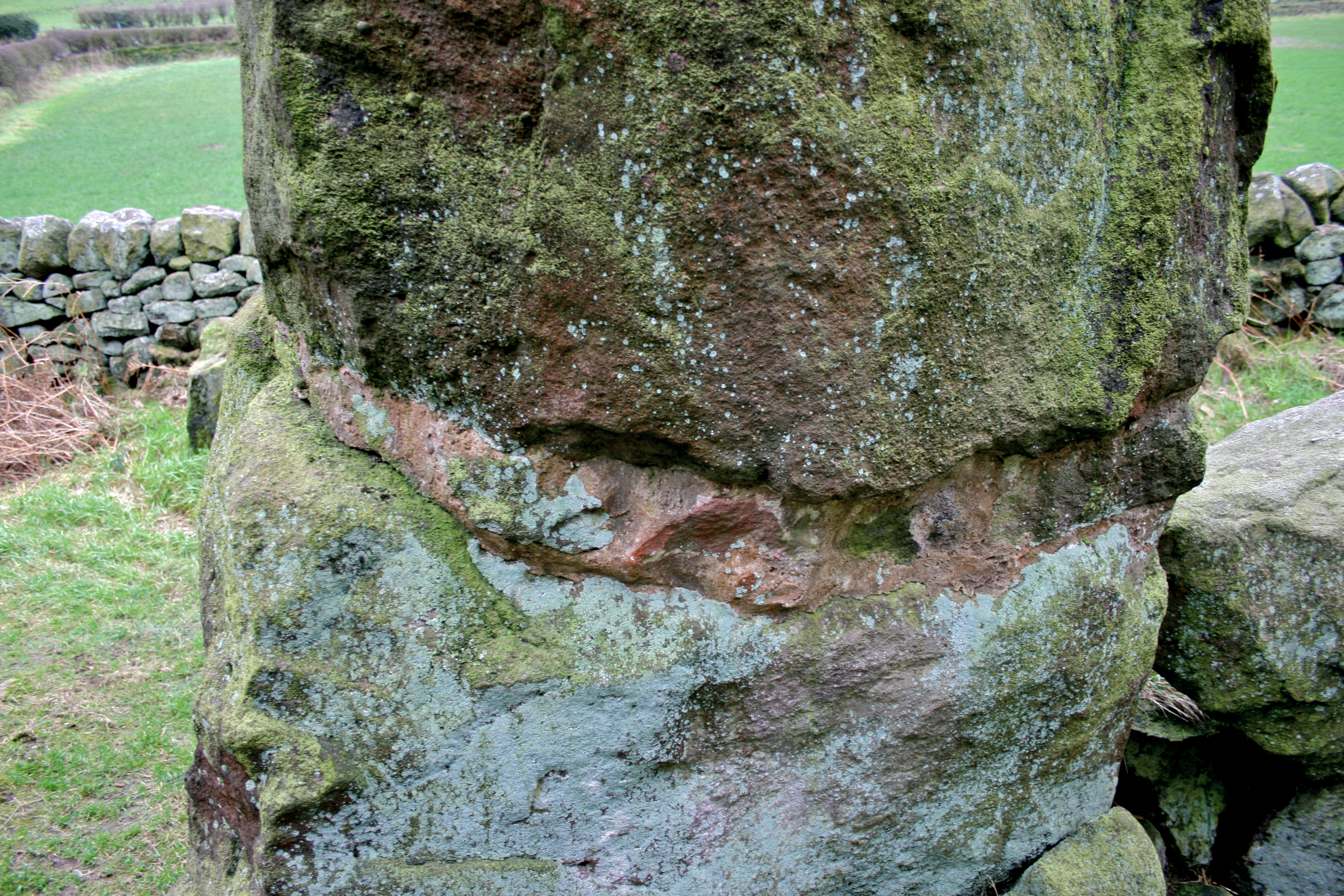
Concrete now joins two pieces of one of the portal stones together.

The largest single ransacking of the monument was the removal of several hundred tons to construct the nearby turnpike road. Stones from the monument were also taken to build the nearby house and farm; other stones were used in an ornamental garden in Tunstall Park. The holed stone was broken some time before 1854; the top half was found replaced in 1877 but was gone again by 1935.

While the southern side of the main chamber was originally a single, 18-foot-long stone (5.5 m), it was split in 1843 by a picknicker's bonfire. Of the portal stones, only two remain, one of which is broken and concreted back together. This was reputedly caused by an engineer from the Manchester Ship Canal, who used the stone to demonstrate a detonator.

Excavations of the site were done by Professor Fleur of Manchester University in 1936 and 1937, with the aim of restoring the site as much as possible to its former condition.

== See also ==
- Scheduled Monuments in Cheshire (pre-1066)

== Sources ==
- Historic England, "The Bridestones Neolithic chambered long cairn (1011115)", National Heritage List for England
- Morgan, Victoria; Morgan, Paul (1 July 2004), Prehistoric Cheshire, Landmark Publishing Ltd, ISBN 1-84306-140-6
- Pastscape: The Bridestones, English Heritage
- Revealing Cheshire's Past: The Bridestones Neolithic chambered long cairn, Cheshire County Council
- Rowlands, Henry (1766), Mona Antiqua Restaurata: An Archaeological Discourse on the Antiquities, Natural and Historical, of the Isle of Anglesey, the Antient Seat of the British Druids (2 ed.)
