= Henry Rowlands =

Henry Rowlands (1655–1723) was rector of Llanidan on Anglesey, and the author of Mona Antiqua Restaurata: An Archaeological Discourse on the Antiquities, Natural and Historical, of the Isle of Anglesey, the Antient Seat of the British Druids (first edition, 1723). The book includes an early description of The Bridestones.

== Life ==
The son of William Rowlands, of Plas Gwyn, Llanedwen, Anglesey, by his wife Maud, daughter of Edward Wynne of Penhesgyn, he was born in 1655 at Plas Gwyn, the seat of the Rowlands family. He received a classical education, took holy orders, and was presented on 2 Oct. 1696 to the living of Llanidan, to which three small chapels were attached.

Rowlands never travelled far from home. He died on 21 November 1723, and was buried at Llanedwen church. By his wife, Elizabeth Nicholas, he left two daughters and three sons.

== Works ==
Rowlands investigated of stone circles, cromlechs, and other prehistoric remains. He conjectured that Anglesey was the ancient centre of the Druids. His major work was Mona Antiqua Restaurata, an Archæological Discourse on the Antiquities Natural and Historical of the Island (Dublin, 1723). A second edition was issued, London, 1766, and a supplement with topographical details in 1775.

Rowlands also wrote a Treatise on Geology and Idea Agriculturæ: the Principles of Vegetation asserted and defended. An Essay on Husbandry (1764), based on personal observations. He left in manuscript a parochial history of Anglesey, written in Latin, Antiquitates Parochiales; it was partly translated in the Cambro Briton, and also published in the original Latin, with an English version, in vols. i.–iv. of the Archæologia Cambrensis. The hundred of Menai only was completed.
