= List of scheduled monuments in Cheshire dated to before 1066 =

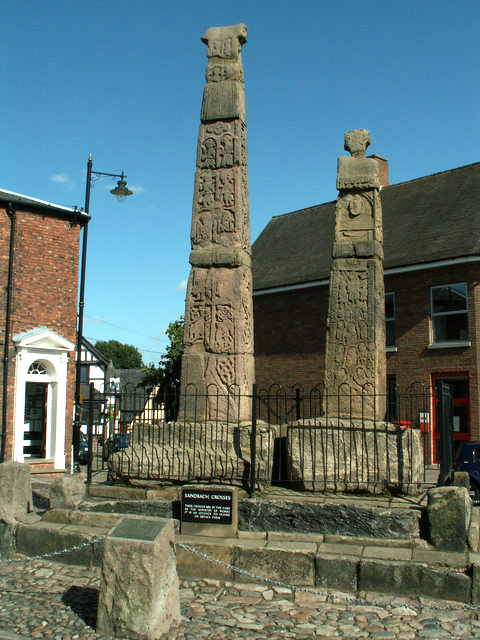
Sandbach Crosses

There are more than two hundred scheduled monuments in Cheshire, a county in North West England, which date from the Neolithic period to the middle of the 20th century. This list includes the scheduled monuments in Cheshire dating from before the year 1066, the year accepted by Revealing Cheshire's Past as the start of the Medieval period.

A scheduled monument is a nationally important archaeological site or monument which is given legal protection by being placed on a list (or "schedule") by the Secretary of State for Culture, Media and Sport; English Heritage takes the leading role in identifying such sites. The current legislation supporting this is the Ancient Monuments and Archaeological Areas Act 1979. The term "monument" can apply to the whole range of archaeological sites, and they are not always visible above ground. Such sites have to have been deliberately constructed by human activity. They range from prehistoric standing stones and burial sites, through Roman remains and medieval structures such as castles and monasteries, to later structures such as industrial sites and buildings constructed for the World Wars.

At least 84 monuments dating from before 1066 have been scheduled in Cheshire, the oldest probably being The Bridestones, a Neolithic long cairn. The monument at Somerford is also thought to have been a long cairn and there is evidence of a Neolithic settlement at Tatton. The Bronze Age is the period most strongly represented before 1066 with 44 monuments, almost all of which are round barrows. Eleven Iron Age hillforts or promontory forts are scheduled. The period of Roman rule left a variety of scheduled monuments, including the remains of settlements at Heronbridge and Wilderspool, and parts of Chester city walls. Definite or possible Roman military camps have been revealed by aerial photography showing cropmarks and parchmarks. The monuments remaining from the Dark Age and the Saxon period consist mainly of portions of crosses, and there is evidence of Saxon occupation of villages, now deserted, at Tatton and Baddiley.

== Monuments ==
Name	Remains	Location	Date	Notes
Abbey Green cultivation marks	Excavation	Chester; 53.1933°N 2.8910°W	Iron Age	Excavations in 1975–77 revealed striations in the sandstone bedrock indicating pre-Roman cultivation of the area.
Baddiley village	Foundations	Baddiley; 53.0497°N 2.5863°W	Late Saxon and Medieval	There is evidence of house platforms and enclosures which indicate a deserted village.
Bartomley mound	Cairn	Wincle; 53.1882°N 2.0546°W	Late Bronze Age	A round barrow which consists of a mound which is partly bedrock. The edges of it have been ploughed and two pits dug into it.
Bearhurst barrow	Earthworks	Henbury; 53.2455°N 2.1912°W	Bronze Age	A round barrow 50 feet (15 m) across and 6 feet (2 m) high. An excavation in 1965–66 revealed flints, pottery sherds and two urns, one of which contained a cremation.
Beeston Castle hillfort	Earthworks	Beeston; 53.1280°N 2.6919°W	Late Bronze Age to late Iron Age	A hillfort on a prominent rocky outcrop. The site is now occupied by a ruined medieval castle which has obliterated the signs of earlier occupation.
Bent Farm Roman Camp	Earthworks	Newbold Astbury; 53.1549°N 2.2442°W	Roman	Earthworks were identified in 1725 as a Roman temporary camp but largely destroyed in 1744. Further investigations carried out in 1967.
Birch Hill	Cropmarks	Manley; 53.2600°N 2.7129°W	Roman	A temporary Roman camp which was identified from cropmarks in 1994 by aerial reconnaissance; no upstanding remains.
Birtles Hall barrow	Earthworks	Over Alderley; 53.2680°N 2.2190°W	Bronze Age	A slightly oval (20m x 19m) round barrow consisting of a mound on top of a natural rise.
Blackrock Farm barrow	Earthwork	Ginclough, Rainow; 53.2865°N 2.0635°W	Bronze Age	A turf-covered round barrow 22.5m in diameter and 1.6m high.
Blue Boar Farm barrow	Earthworks	Rainow; 53.2844°N 2.0453°W	Bronze Age	A round barrow, described in 1878 as a conical tumulus. It is now an oval (31.5m x 29m) mound of earth and stones up to 2m high.
Bowstones	Standing stones	Lyme Handley; 53.3287°N 2.0406°W	Late Saxon	Two cross staffs set in a massive stone base. Each has traces of carved interlaced ornament. Carved initials have been added, probably in the Medieval period.
Bradley Hillfort	Earthworks	Kingsley; 53.2861°N 2.6926°W	Iron Age	The smallest promontory hillfort in the county. It has natural defences only to the north; the other defences have been damaged by ploughing.
The Bridestones	Stone structure	Congleton; 53.1565°N 2.1398°W	Neolithic	The only known Neolithic tomb in the county, formerly a chambered long cairn. Much of its fabric was removed in the mid-18th century to build a road. It now consists of a chamber enclosed by large stone slabs.
Brink Farm barrow	Earthworks	Rainow; 53.3089°N 2.0445°W	Bronze Age	A bowl-shaped round barrow consisting of a mound near the top of a knoll.
Bullstones	Earthwork with upright stone	Wincle; 53.2052°N 2.0732°W	Bronze Age	A cremation burial site in which the bones of a child or young person were found 3 feet (1 m) below the surface surrounded by a stone circle 20 feet (6 m) in diameter. Inside the circle was an upright stone slab, which is still present.
Burton Point	Earthworks	Neston; 53.2548°N 3.0460°W	Iron Age	A promontory fort consisting of earthworks in an arc protecting a former headland overlooking the River Dee.
Capesthorne Hall barrow (south)	Earthworks	Siddington; 53.2495°N 2.2336°W	Bronze Age	A round barrow on a high point in woodland.
Capesthorne Hall barrow (north)	Earthworks	Siddington; 53.2529°N 2.2365°W	Bronze Age	A round barrow on the summit of a knoll. (The ornamental stone pedestal on its top is not part of the schedule.)
Carden Park barrow	Earthworks	Carden; 53.0753°N 2.8007°W	Bronze Age	An oval (32m x 25m) bowl barrow of sand and earth on a saddle of higher ground (now in a golf course).
Charles Head barrow	Earthworks	Rainow; 53.3051°N 2.0367°W	Bronze Age	A round barrow on the crest of a ridge, now crossed by a drystone wall.
Chester Roman Amphitheatre	Earthworks	Chester; 53.1893°N 2.8871°W	Roman	Originally in wood, later in stone. The northern half has been excavated.
Chester city walls	City walls	Chester; 53.1923°N 2.8891°W	Roman and medieval	An almost complete circuit of red sandstone walls round the city. The north and east walls follow Roman foundations and contain fabric from that era.
Cleulow cross	Standing stone	Wincle; 53.2038°N 2.0735°W	Early Medieval/ Dark Age	A gritstone pillar in a socket stone on a mound. The shaft is round and has the remains of a small wheelhead cross on the top. In The Weirdstone of Brisingamen, a work for children by Alan Garner, Cleulow Cross is the location of the finale of the story.
Coddington barrow	Earthworks	Coddington; 53.0919°N 2.8187°W	Bronze Age	A tree-covered mound of red sand with a surrounding ditch, scheduled as a bowl barrow.
Disley churchyard cross	Stone	Disley; 53.3575°N 2.0398°W	Early Medieval/ Dark Age	A socket stone for two crosses in St Mary's churchyard. It was discovered in 1958 and thought to be the setting for two Saxon crosses.
Eddisbury hillfort	Earthworks	Delamere; 53.2192°N 2.6705°W	Iron Age	A former hillfort on a steep-sided sandstone projection on the east side of the mid-Cheshire ridge. The defences consist of two earth ramparts with a single ditch between them.
Edgar's Cave	Former quarry	Handbridge; 53.1844°N 2.8887°W	Roman	A quarry which included a shrine to Minerva whose image is still visible. The shrine is a Grade I listed building.
Elm Bank Roman Camp	Cropmark	Waverton; 53.1701°N 2.8222°W	Roman	Cropmarks show a rectangular enclosure which housed a Roman practice camp.
Engine Vein copper mine	Trench and pits	Nether Alderley; 53.2941°N 2.2104°W	Bronze Age and later	An opencast mine for copper and other minerals in use from the early Bronze Age, in Roman and medieval times, through to the Victorian era.
Gallowsclough Cob barrow	Earthworks	Oakmere; 53.2373°N 2.6455°W	Bronze Age	A round barrow excavated in 1960 which was found to contain a primary cremation burial as well as fragments of a secondary burial, time frame unknown.
Ginclough standing stone	Standing stone	Ginclough; 53.2842°N 2.0683°W	Late prehistoric	A large stone 1m high cut away on two sides.
Harbutt's Field Roman fort	Plan of Roman fort	Middlewich53.1985°N 2.4472°W	Roman	The complete plan of a Roman fort has been revealed by a geophysical survey.
Helsby hill fort	Earthworks	Helsby Hill; 53.2732°N 2.7630°W	Iron Age	A promontory fort with naturally steep slopes to the west and north and an earth and stone rampart to the south.
Heronbridge Roman Site	Earthworks	Claverton; 53.1709°N 2.8839°W	Roman	A Roman settlement on each side of Watling Street with evidence of industrial activity in the late 1st and the 2nd century.
High Billinge barrow	Earthworks	Utkinton; 53.1911°N 2.6679°W	Bronze Age	A round barrow 30m across and 1.8m high in woodland on a hill-top. Unexcavated.
Hoole Roman Camp	Parchmark	Hoole; 53.2044°N 2.8551°W	Roman	Aerial photography in August 1995 showed a rectangular enclosure, part of which lies under the A41 road.
Ince Roman Fortlet	Cropmarks	Ince; 53.2870°N 2.8303°W	Roman	Aerial photography showed a double-ditched rectangular enclosure. Excavation revealed a piece of samian pottery and postholes.
Jodrell Bank barrow cemetery	Earthworks	Swettenham; 53.2243°N 2.3036°W	Bronze Age	Four remaining round barrows from an original group of six.
Kelsborrow promontory fort	Earthworks	Delamere; 53.2027°N 2.7026°W	Iron Age	A promontory fort with steep sides to the south and a curving bank and ditch to the north. In the 19th century a palstave and a fragment of a sword were found.
Knightslow barrows	Earthworks	Lyme Handley; 53.3319°N 2.0547°W	Bronze Age	A group of four round barrows in woodland on a hill.
London Road barrow	Earthworks	Prestbury; 53.3017°N 2.1398°W	Bronze Age	A slightly oval (26m x 25m) barrow up to 1.3m in height. In 1808 a number of cairns were found, one of which contained cremations.
Long Lane barrow	Earthworks	Bickerton; 53.0691°N 2.7320°W	Bronze Age	A round barrow consisting of a low mound 24m in diameter and 0.5m high on a knoll to the east of Bickerton Hill.
Longley Farm field system	Earthworks	Kelsall; 53.2247°N 2.7056°W	Iron Age (or medieval/post-medieval)	A system of terraces, lynchets and enclosures.
Maiden Castle	Earthworks	Bickerton Hill; 53.0708°N 2.7511°W	Iron Age	A promontory hill fort on a spur with an earthwork defending its neck and two lines of ramparts on the south and east.
Meadows Farm barrow	Earthworks	Horton-cum-Malpas; 53.0296°N 2.8146°W	Bronze Age	A round barrow which contained an oak plank, possibly part of a coffin.
Moultonbank barrow	Earthworks	Moulton; 53.2203°N 2.5211°W	Bronze Age	A round barrow on the top of a glacial mound 35m in diameter and 1.5m high.
The Murder Stone	Standing stone	Lyme Handley; 53.3261°N 2.0248°W	Bronze Age	A standing stone consisting of a triangular slab of gritstone.
Nab Head barrow	Earthworks	Bollington; 53.3058°N 2.0912°W	Bronze Age	An oval (19m x 17m) barrow up to 1.8m high with a central depression, surrounded by a ditch.
Two sections of the North Cheshire Ridge Roman Road	Earthworks	Appleton Thorn; 53.3497°N 2.5461°W; Stretton; 53.3436°N 2.5600°W	Roman	Much of The Appleton Thorn portion of the road is now covered by the village hall car park; the scheduled portion of the road in Stretton is near to Mosswood Hall
Oakmere hill fort	Earthworks	Oakmere; 53.2060°N 2.6312°W	Iron Age	A promontory fort on a spur protruding into the mere with a rampart across the east side.
Peckforton Mere promontory fort	Earthworks and cropmarks	Peckforton; 53.1144°N 2.6803°W	Iron Age	A defensive settlement on a ridge with the mere to the southwest and marsh to the northwest and southeast. The northeast was defended by a ditch.
Picton Roman camp	Cropmarks	Picton; 53.2243°N 2.8677°W	Roman	Aerial photography in July 1995 showed a rectangular enclosure which was probably a Roman practice camp.
Prestbury churchyard cross shaft	Stone fragments	Prestbury; 53.2892°N 2.1508°W	Early Medieval/ Dark Age	Three Saxon stone fragments cemented together in the churchyard of St Peter's; the lower two fragments come from one cross while the top one is from a different cross.
Reed Hill cairn	Earthworks	Lyme Handley; 53.3155°N 2.0342°W	Bronze Age	A round barrow on the apex of a natural mound. Excavation in 1911 revealed a gritstone burial chamber containing cremated human bones.
Robin Hood's Tump	Earthworks	Alpraham; 53.1346°N 2.6371°W	Bronze Age	A sand and turf round barrow 17m in diameter and 1.5m high. Excavation revealed worked flints but no evidence of a burial.
Sandbach Crosses	Standing stones	Sandbach; 53.1440°N 2.3621°W	Early Medieval/ Dark Age	A pair of Saxon crosses decorated with carvings on all faces. They have been moved on several occasions and were erected in their present position in 1816. They are listed at Grade I.
Sandbach cross fragments	Stones	Sandbach; 53.1435°N 2.3611°W	Early Medieval/ Dark Age	Three fragments from the shaft of one or more Saxon crosses in S Mary's churchyard.
Seven Lows barrows	Earthworks	Delamere; 53.1987°N 2.6550°W	Bronze Age	Five barrows remaining out of an original total of seven.
Somerford Bridge barrow	Earthwork	Somerford; 53.1677°N 2.2553°W	Neolithic	A suspected long barrow, now a mound covered in oak trees.
Sponds Hill barrows	Earthworks	Lyme Handley; 53.3194°N 2.0471°W	Bronze Age	Two round barrows, one on the summit of the hill, the other to the south.
St. Plegmund's well	Holy well	Mickle Trafford; 53.2253°N 2.8175°W	Early Medieval/ Dark Age	A well, now dry, surrounded by stone slabs.
Stamford Heath enclosure	Shown on aerial photographs	Christleton; 53.1972°N 2.8087°W	Roman	Photography in 1947 revealed a rectangular earthwork enclosure which may be a Roman camp.
Stamford Lodge Roman Camp	Cropmarks	Christleton; 53.1964°N 2.8179°W	Roman	Photography in 1947 revealed a rectangular earthwork enclosure which may be a Roman camp.
Sutton Hall cairn	Earthworks	Sutton, Macclesfield; 53.2388°N 2.1140°W	Bronze Age	A round barrow 24m in diameter and up to 1.4m in height. When excavated in 1962 secondary cremations were found but no primary cremation.
Swettenham Hall barrow	Earthworks	Swettenham; 53.1971°N 2.2801°W	Bronze Age	A probable round barrow which has been spread by ploughing.
Tatton settlement, old hall and mill dam	Earthworks	Tatton Park; 53.3286°N 2.3671°W	Late Neolithic, Saxon, and Medieval	A former village occupied in the late Neolithic, Saxon and Medieval periods. Now deserted and only earthworks remain. The site includes the ground beneath Tatton Old Hall.
Thieves Moss Roman road	Site of road	Delamere Forest; 53.2182°N 2.6563°W	Roman	The possible site of section of the Chester-Manchester Roman road.
Toot Hill barrow	Mound	Macclesfield Forest; 53.2454°N 2.0440°W	Bronze Age	An oval barrow of earth and stones at the centre of which is a gritstone slab.
Tytherington barrow	Earthworks	Tytherington; 53.2712°N 2.1308°W	Bronze Age	A round barrow, now in a housing development, which was found to contain a cremation and part of an urn.
Upton Heath Roman Camp	Cropmark	Upton Heath; 53.2201°N 2.8744°W	Roman	A rectangular round-cornered enclosure, possibly a Roman practice camp.
Upton Roman Camp	Parchmarks	Upton-by-Chester; 53.2196°N 2.8703°W	Roman	Aerial photography in August 1989 showed a rectangular enclosure; no signs of it can be seen on the ground.
Upton Roman camp (1)	Parchmarks	Upton-by-Chester; 53.2233°N 2.8721°W	Roman	Aerial photography in August 1990 showed a rectangular enclosure with a rounded entrance.
Upton Roman camp (2)	Cropmarks	Upton-by-Chester; 53.2168°N 2.8695°W	Roman	Aerial photography has shown a rectangular enclosure. Further investigations have revealed evidence of a ditch and sherds of Roman pottery.
West Park cross shafts	Three standing stones	West Park, Macclesfield; 53.2634°N 2.1365°W	Early Medieval/ Dark Age	Three Saxon circular crosses with traces of ornamental sculpting, now mounted in a public park.
Whitley barrow	Earthworks	Lower Whitley; 53.3099°N 2.5747°W	Bronze Age	A slightly oval round barrow.
Wilderspool Roman site	Excavation	Wilderspool; 53.3750°N 2.5871°W	Roman	Excavations have shown parts of a walled town with evidence of industrial activity.
Winwick barrow	Earthworks	Highfield Lane, Winwick; 53.4342°N 2.5827°W	Bronze Age	A round barrow, formerly part of a cemetery. Excavation in 1860 revealed a large urn containing human bones, a stone axe hammer and a bronze spear head.
Withington Hall barrow cemetery	Earthworks	Withington, Macclesfield; 53.2482°N 2.2911°W	Bronze Age	Three round barrows, two of which have been excavated revealing evidence of cremations.
Woodhouse hillfort	Stone and earth bank	Frodsham; 53.2763°N 2.7350°W	Iron Age	A promontory hillfort with steep slopes on the south and west sides and a stone and earth bank on the other sides.
Wybunbury church site	Foundations	Wybunbury; 53.0452°N 2.4486°W	Late Saxon	A church was present in the Domesday survey. The subsequent medieval Church of St Chad (other than the tower) has been demolished and the site is scheduled.
Yearn's Low barrow	Earthworks	Rainow; 53.2806°N 2.0548°W	Bronze Age	A round barrow 19m in diameter in which Roman coins and other objects have been found.

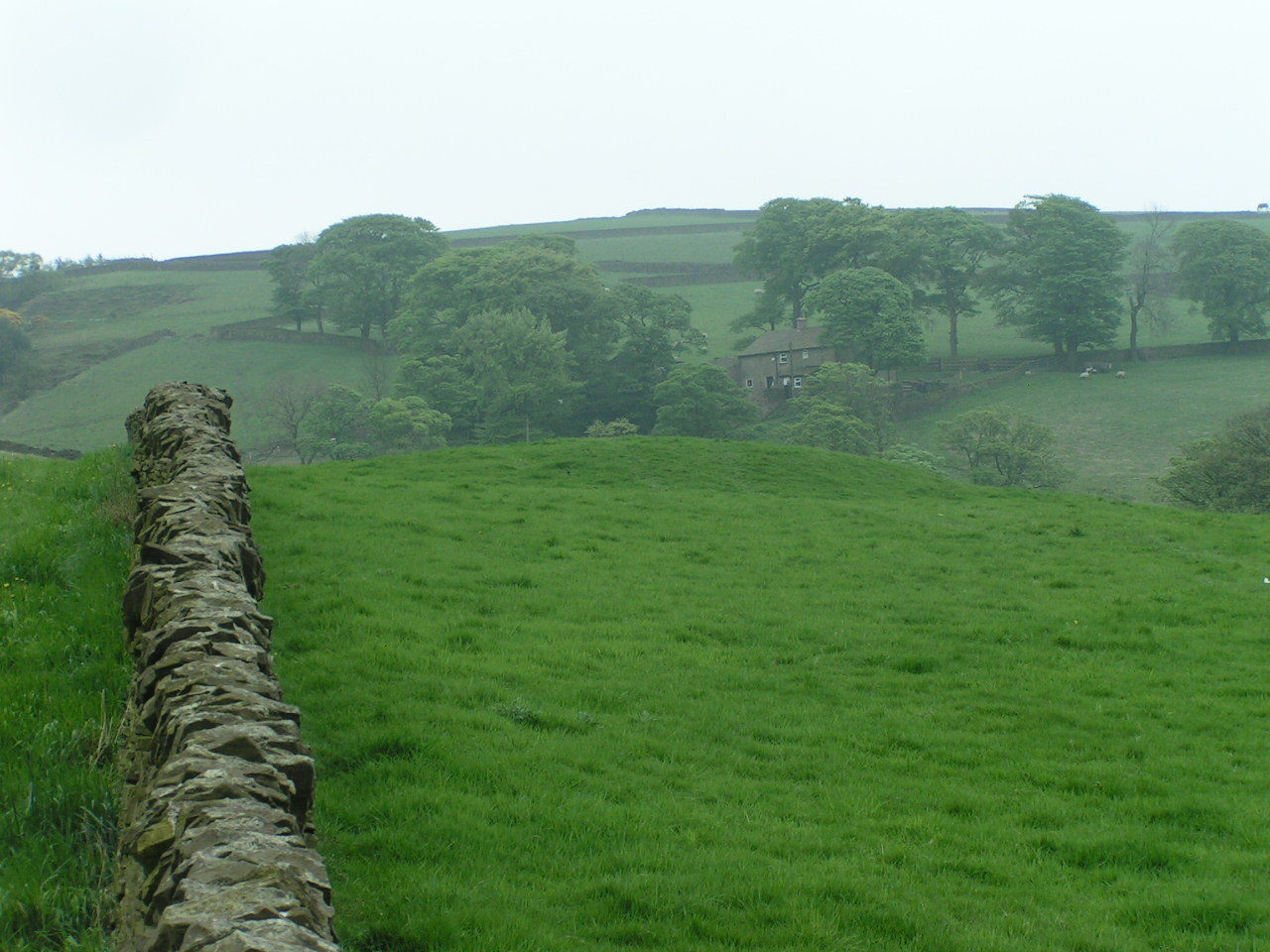
Blackrock Farm barrow

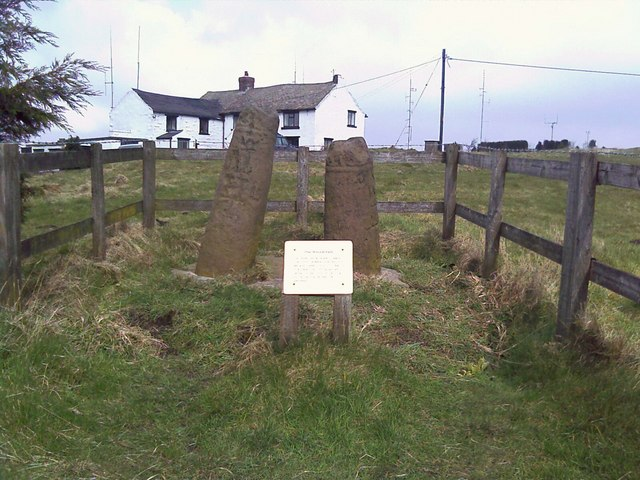
The Bowstones

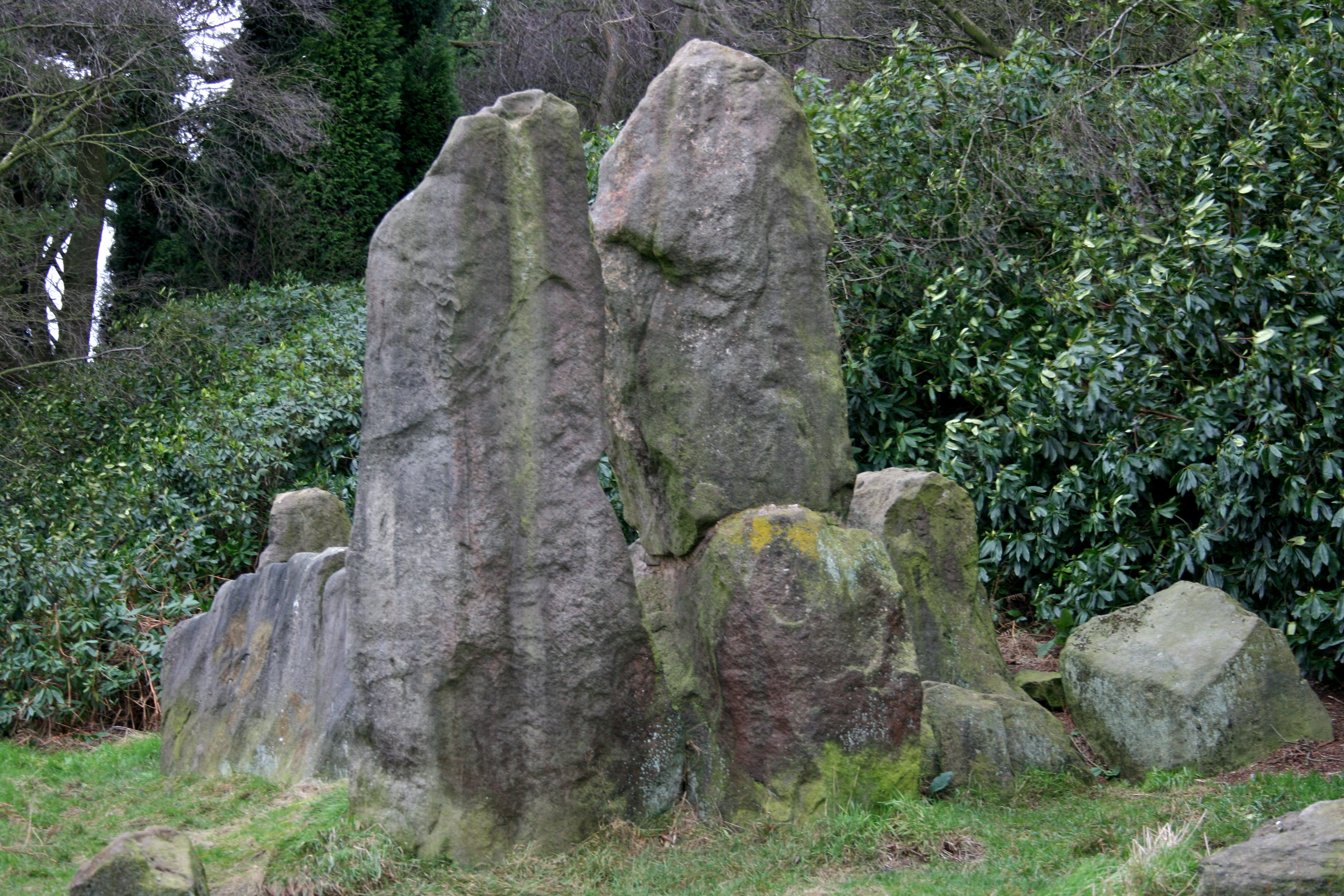
The Bridestones

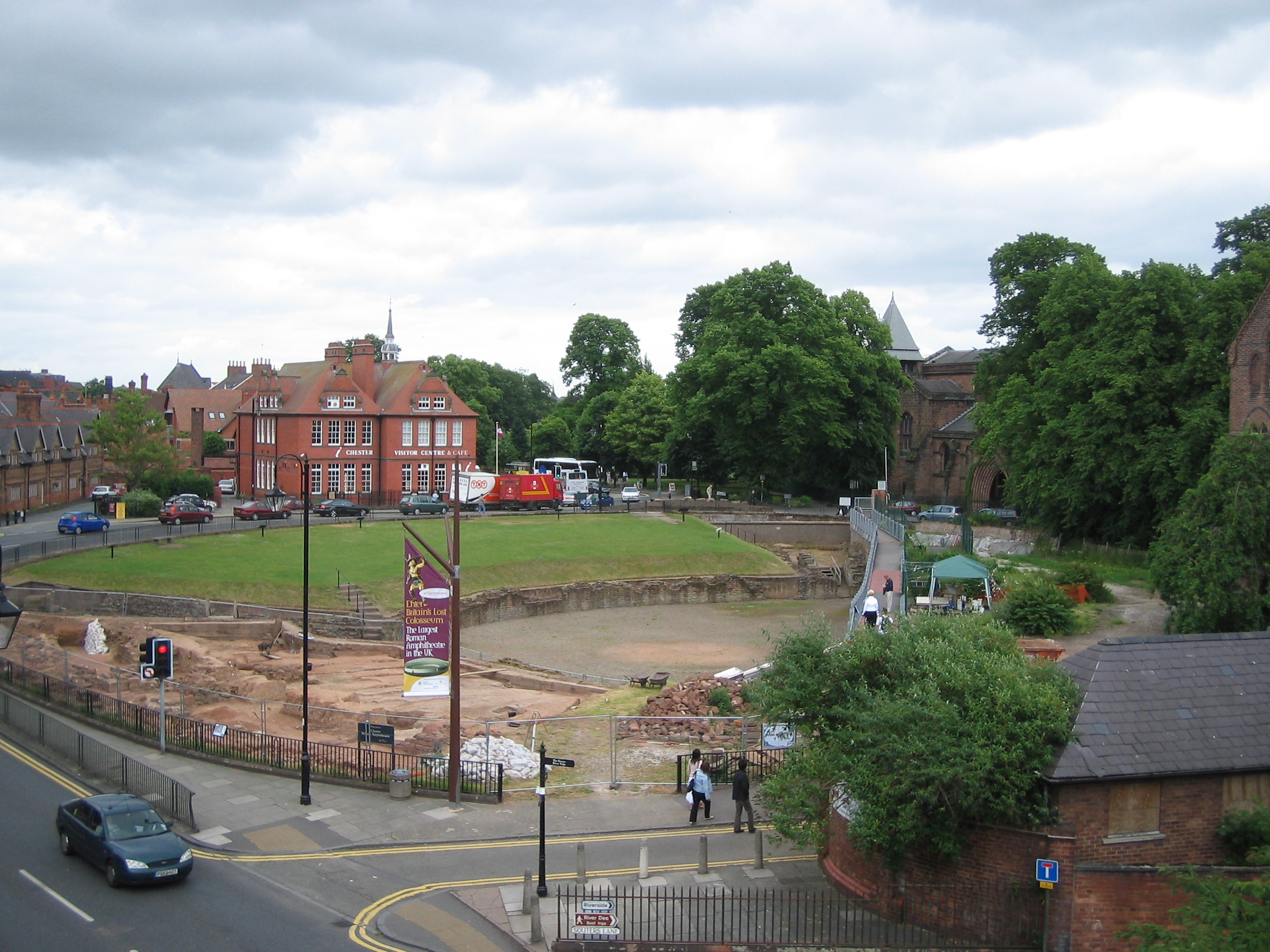
Chester Roman amphitheatre

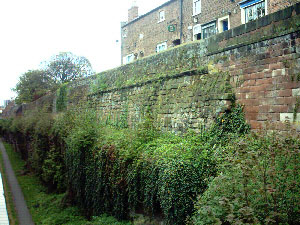
Chester City Walls

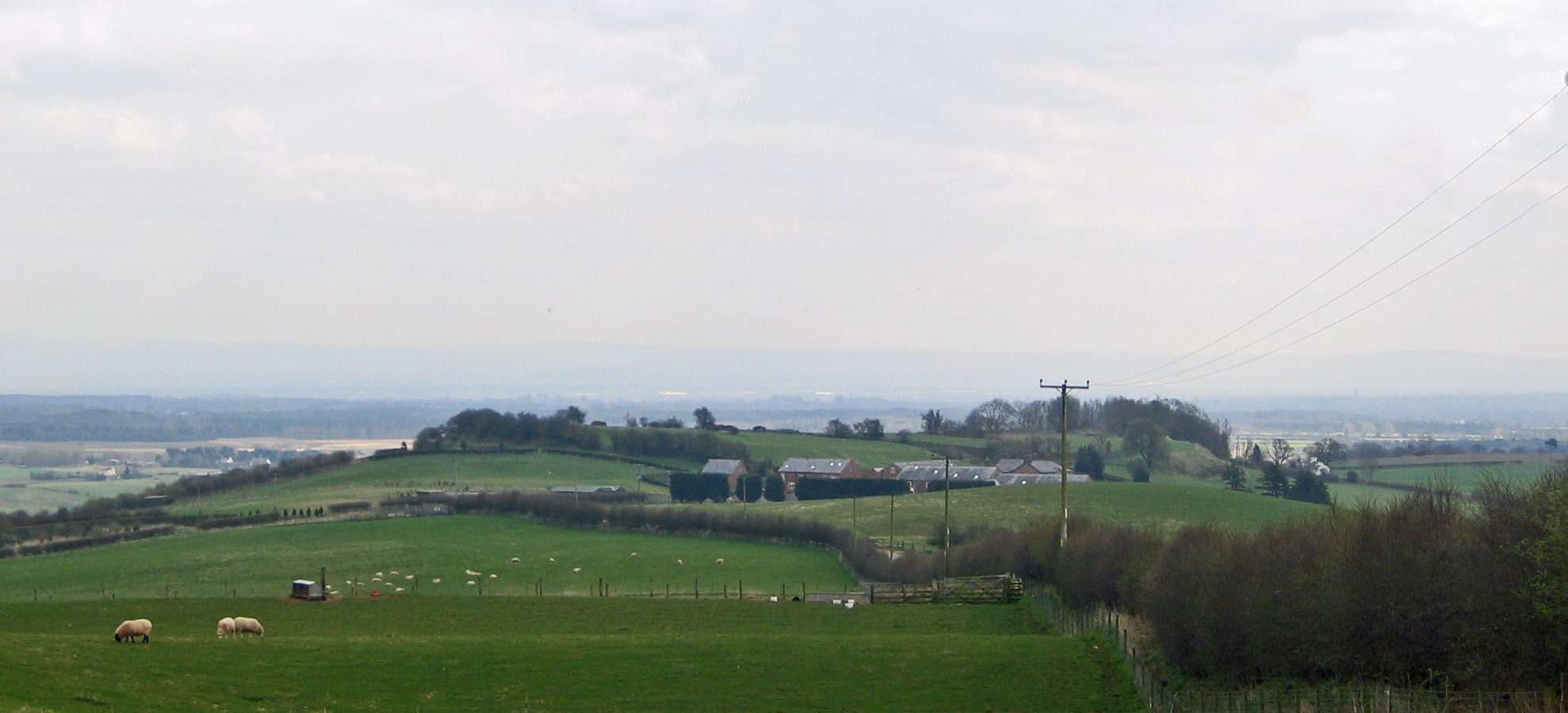
Eddisbury hill fort from the west

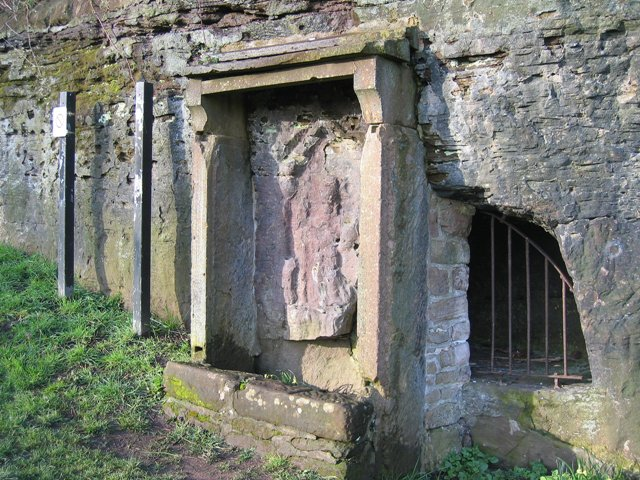
Minerva's shrine in Edgar's Field

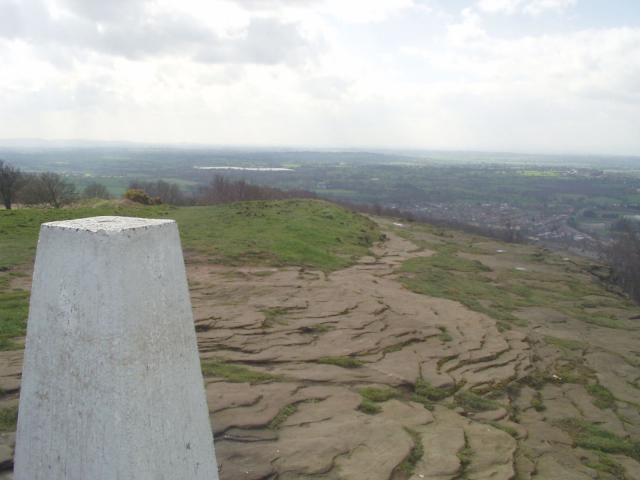
Helsby Hill

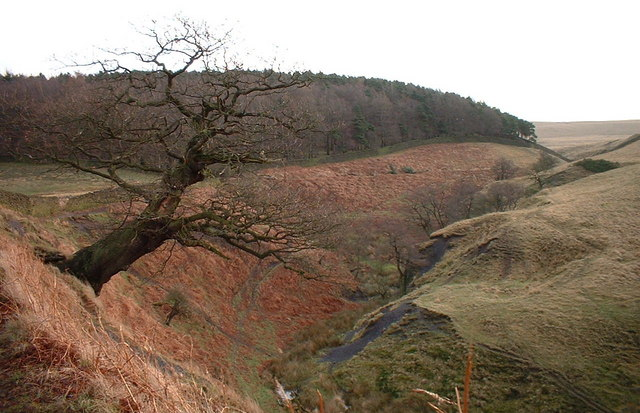
Knightslow Wood

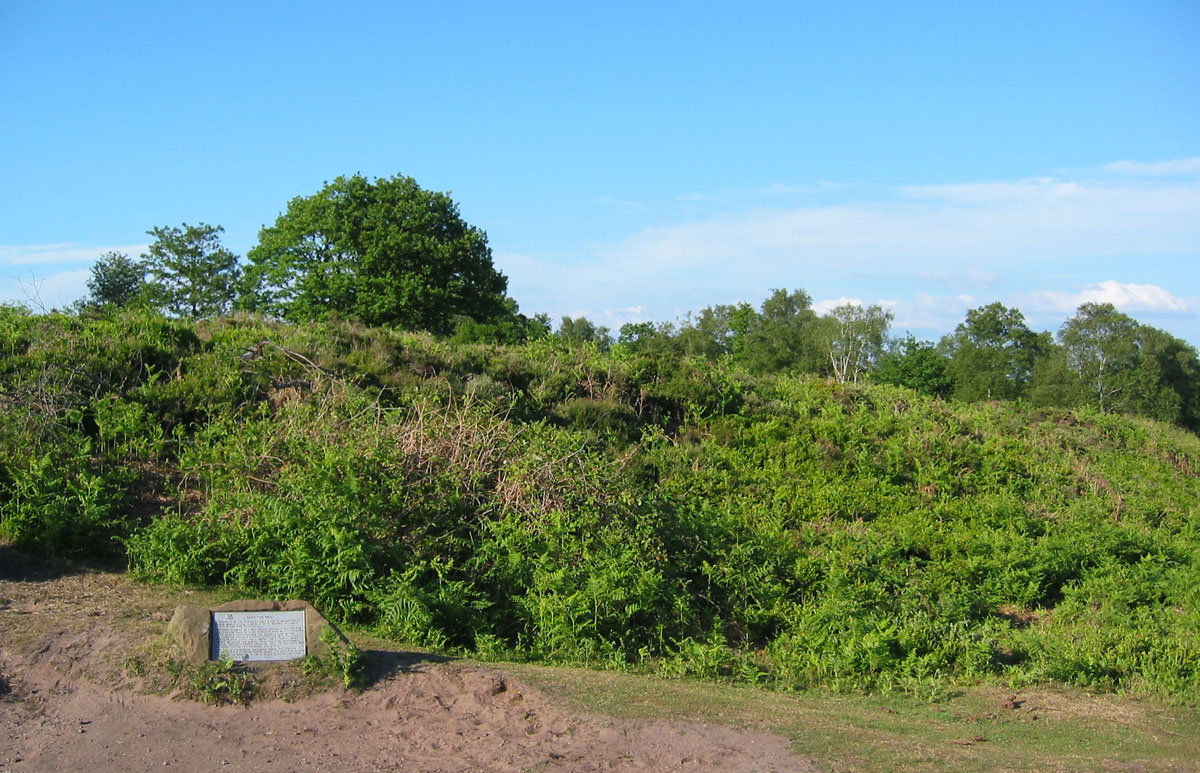
Maiden Castle rampart

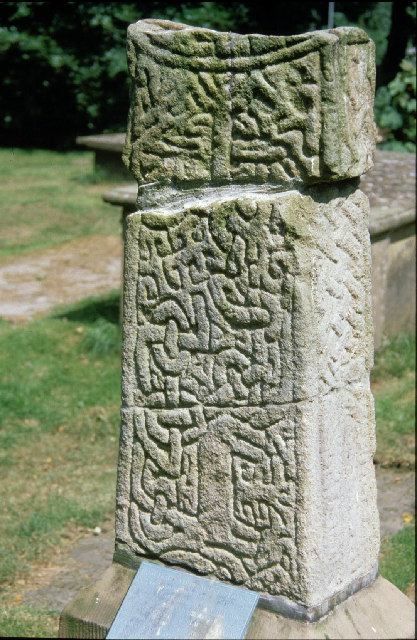
Prestbury churchyard cross

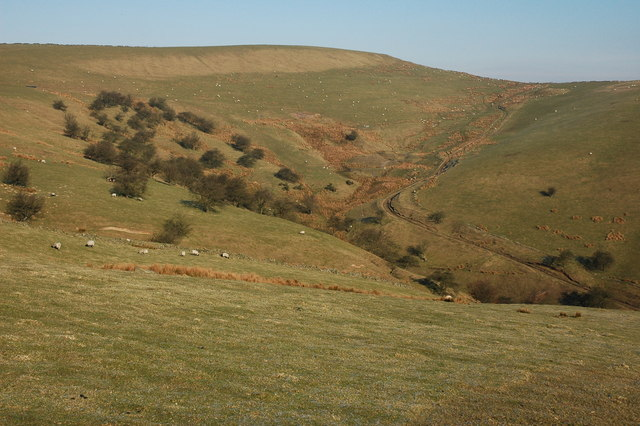
Sponds Hill

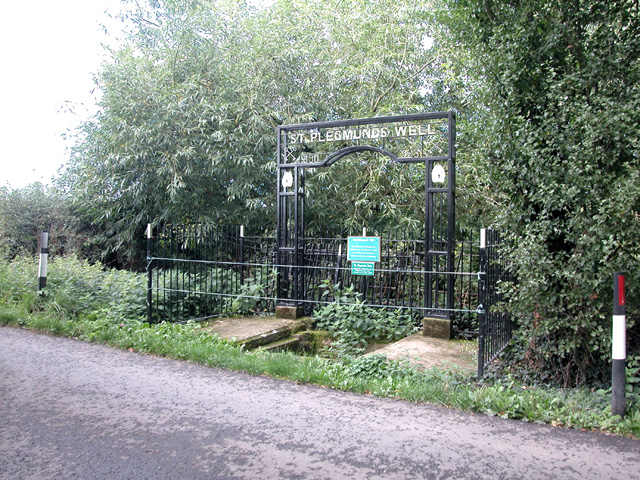
St. Plegmund's well

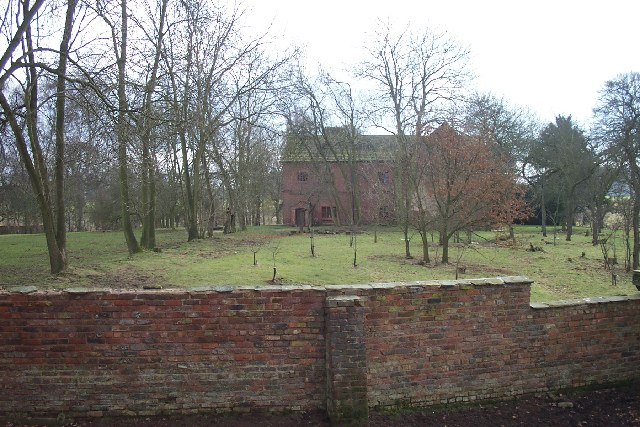
Grounds around Tatton Old Hall

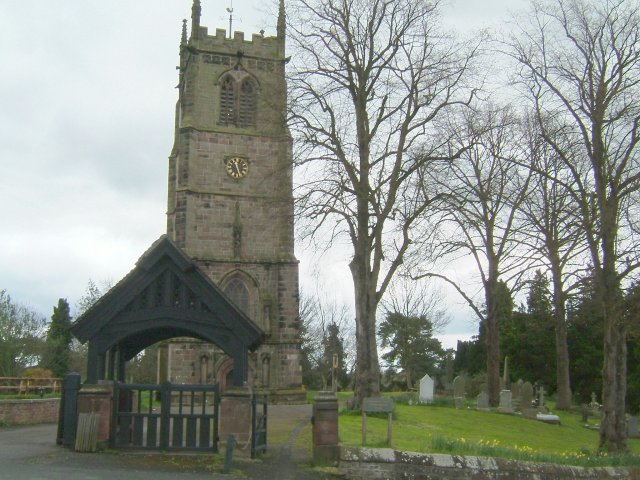
Grounds of St Chad's Church, Wybunbury

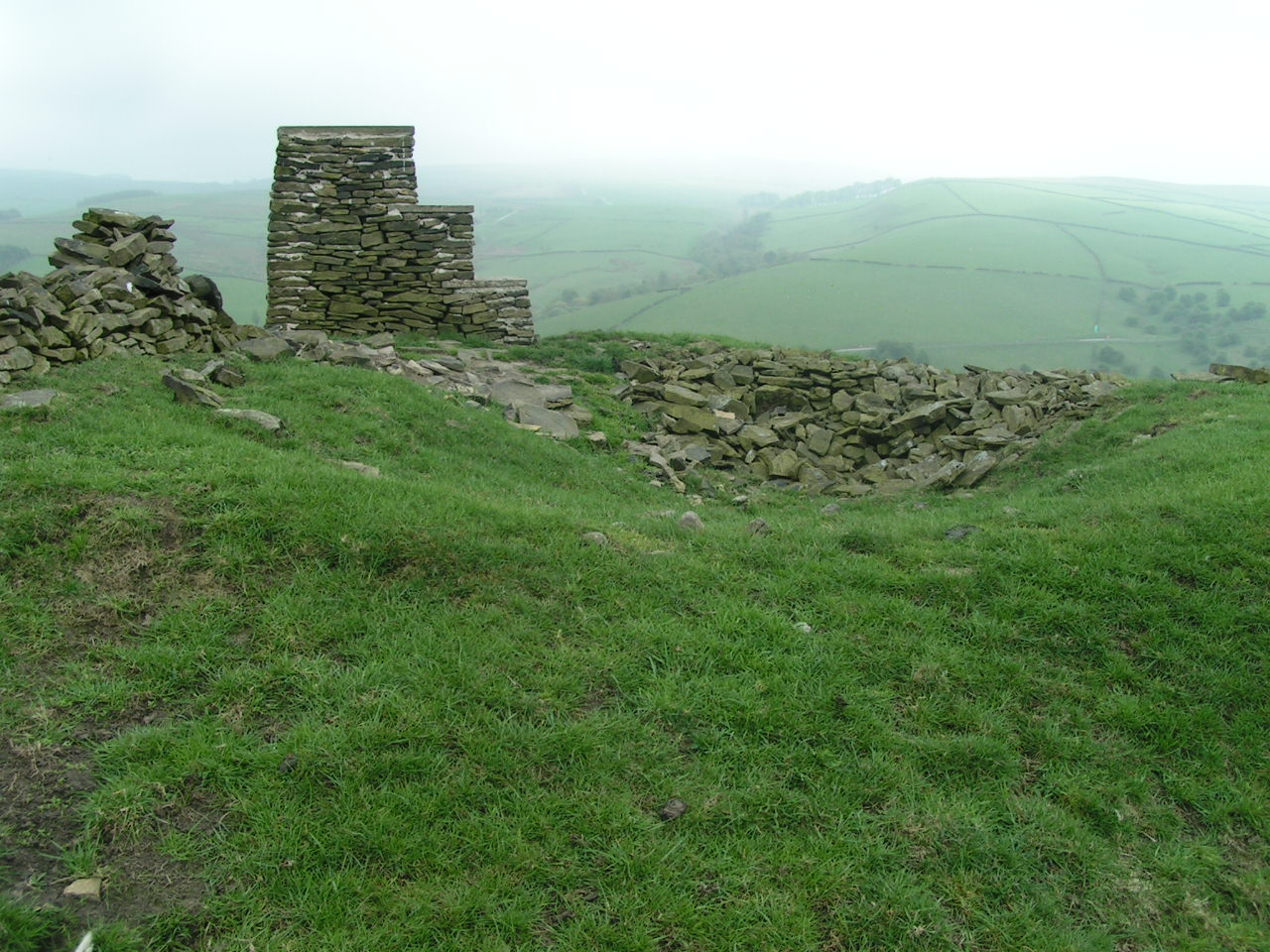
Barrow on Yearns Low

== See also ==
- List of scheduled monuments in Cheshire (1066–1539)
- List of scheduled monuments in Cheshire since 1539
- Grade I listed buildings in Cheshire
