= Eddisbury hill fort =

Iron Age hillfort in Cheshire, England

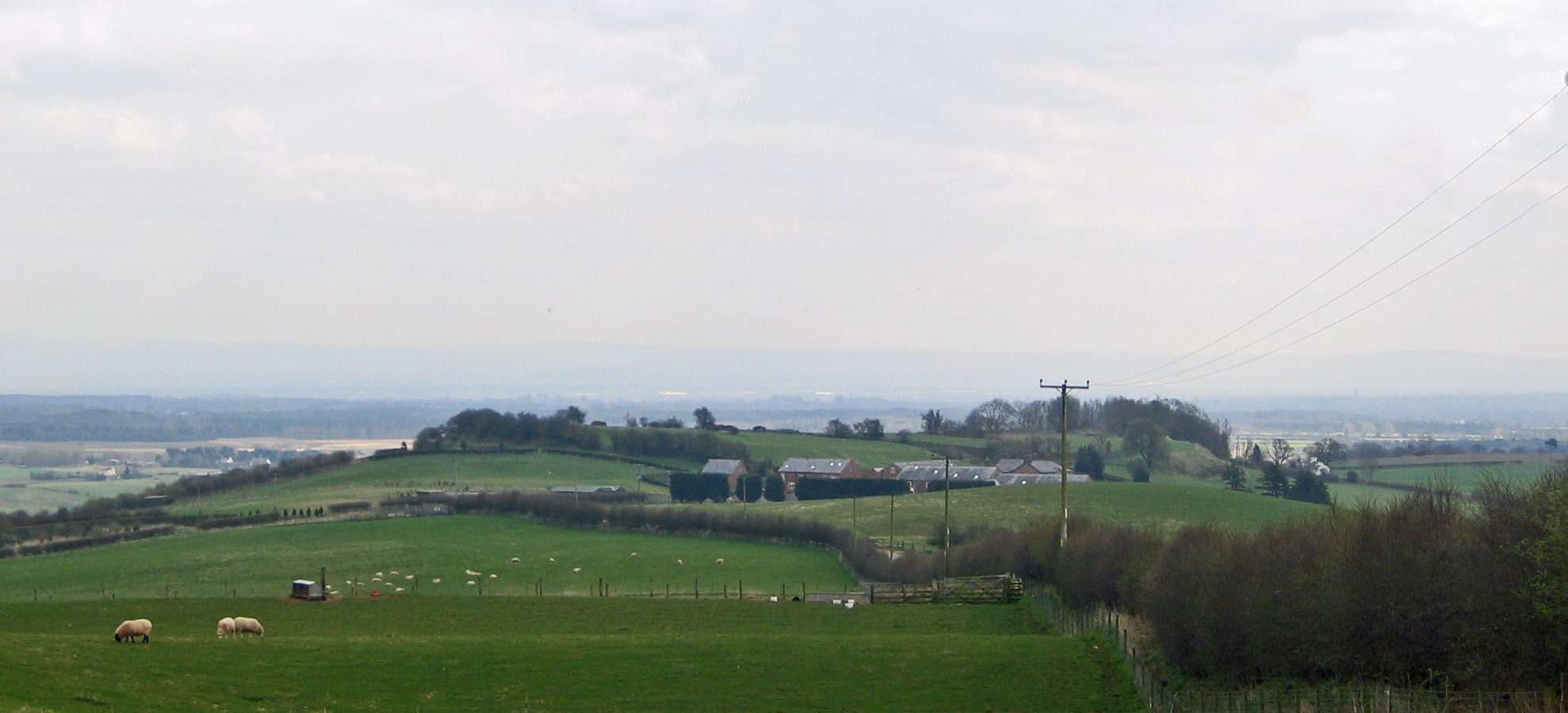
- Eddisbury hill fort from the west

- Location within Cheshire

General information
- Architectural style: Iron Age hill fort
- Location: England
- Coordinates: 53.220214°N 2.670175°W

Technical details
- Size: 7 acres (28,000 m^{2}) interior 15.5 acres (63,000 m^{2}) including defences

Scheduled monument
- Designated: 17 December 1934
- Reference no.: 1013295

Eddisbury hill fort, also known as Castle Ditch, is an Iron Age hill fort near Delamere, Cheshire, in northern England. Hill forts are fortified hill-top settlements constructed across Britain during the Iron Age. Eddisbury is the largest and most complex of the seven hill forts in the county of Cheshire. It was constructed before 200–100 BC and expanded in 1–50 AD. In the 1st century AD, the Romans slighted the site. It was reoccupied in the 6th–8th centuries AD, and an Anglo-Saxon burh was probably established at Eddisbury in 914. In the medieval and post-medieval periods quarrying and farming have damaged the site. Ownership is currently split between the Forestry Commission and a local farm. Eddisbury is protected as a Scheduled Ancient Monument.

== Background ==
Hill forts developed in the Late Bronze and Early Iron Age, roughly the start of the first millennium BC. The reason for their emergence in Britain, and their purpose, has been a subject of debate. It has been argued that they could have been military sites constructed in response to invasion from continental Europe, sites built by invaders, or a military reaction to social tensions caused by an increasing population and consequent pressure on agriculture. The dominant view since the 1960s has been that the increasing use of iron led to social changes in Britain. Deposits of iron ore were located in different places to the tin and copper ore necessary to make bronze, and as a result trading patterns shifted and the old elites lost their economic and social status. Power passed into the hands of a new group of people. Archaeologist Barry Cunliffe believes that population increase still played a role and has stated "[the forts] provided defensive possibilities for the community at those times when the stress [of an increasing population] burst out into open warfare. But I wouldn't see them as having been built because there was a state of war. They would be functional as defensive strongholds when there were tensions and undoubtedly some of them were attacked and destroyed, but this was not the only, or even the most significant, factor in their construction".

== Location and layout ==
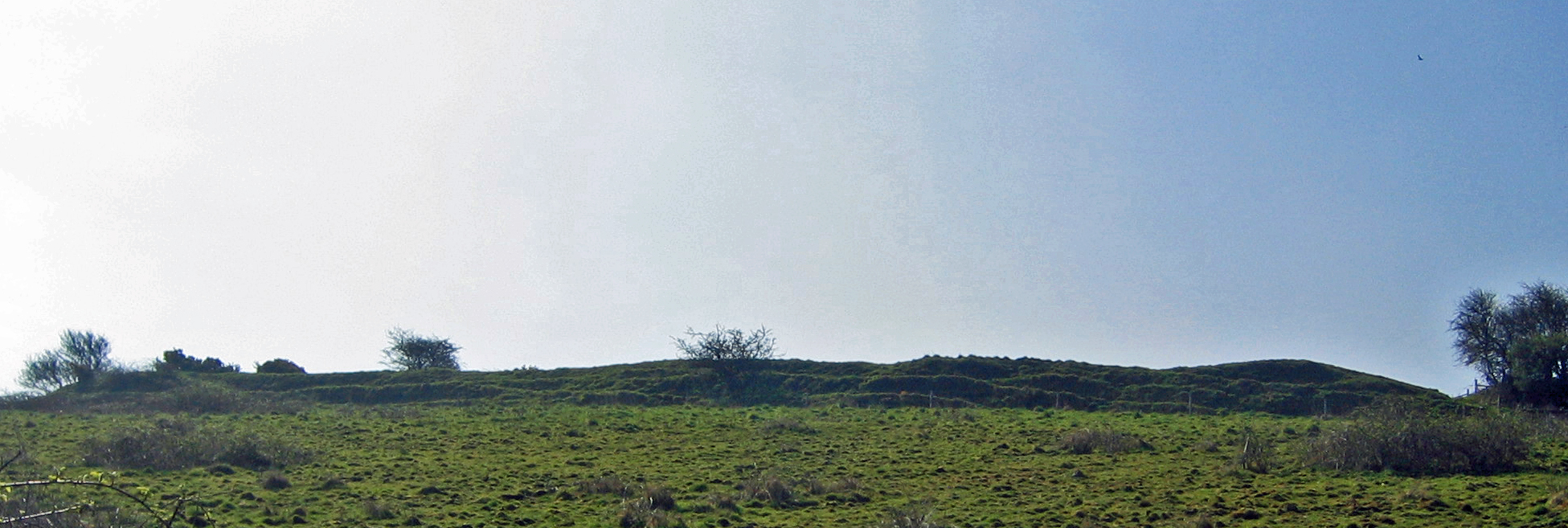
The earthworks of Eddisbury hill fort from the east

Although there are over 1,300 hill forts in England, they are concentrated in the south of the country, with only seven in Cheshire. Eddisbury is the largest and most complex of the Cheshire hill forts. The forts form two geographical groups of three, with Maiden Castle on its own in the south of the county; Eddisbury hill fort is in the southern group with Kelsborrow Castle and Oakmere hill fort. Located at grid reference SJ553694, Eddisbury Hill, in common with all of the hill forts in Cheshire, sits on part of the central ridge that runs north–south through the county. Eddisbury hill fort follows the contours of its hill and measures 200 by 380 m (660 by 1,250 ft). It is surrounded by two ramparts with a ditch in between. The ditch is 10 m (33 ft) wide and 0.5 m (1.6 ft) deep. The inner bank lies between.

== History ==
There is evidence of Bronze Age activity at Eddisbury. Before 250 BC, a palisade was erected on Eddisbury Hill. The first hill fort was built in 200–100 BC. Eddisbury hill fort has two main archaeological phases. In the first phase of activity, the site was defended by a single rampart and ditch; this type of hill fort is termed "univallate". The settlement was concentrated on the eastern part of the fort's hill. During the second phase, the fort extended westwards, occupying the entire hill top, and the defences were enhanced through the addition of more ramparts and ditches. The enclosed area expanded from 5.5 acres (22,000 m^{2}) to 7 acres (28,000 m^{2}), and the defences covered 15.5 acres (63,000 m^{2}), 6 acres (24,000 m^{2}) more than previously. There are two theories about the expansion of the fort: either the growth westwards and the extended defences were completed at the same time or that they were separate events. If they happened at the same time it is likely to have been in the interest of making the site easier to defend. If they were separate, the ramparts may have been extended to incorporate an entrance at the western end of the site. The expansion phase dated to 1–50 AD.

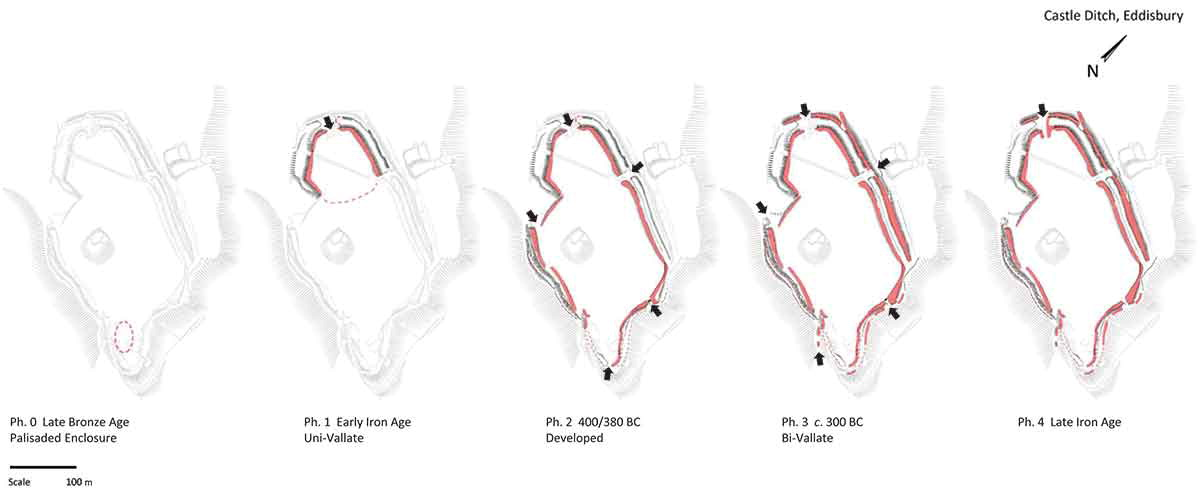
A revised chronology proposed by Pope et al identified four phases in the hillfort's development.

In the late 1st century AD, the hill fort was destroyed (slighted) by the Romans. In the 4th–6th centuries AD, the hill fort was reoccupied and huts were built over the inner rampart. A later hut, dating from the 6th–8th centuries, has also been discovered. Eddisbury has been suggested as the site of an Anglo-Saxon burh built in 914 by Æthelflæd, daughter of Alfred the Great, and recorded in the Mercian Register in the Anglo-Saxon Chronicle but this has been queried. In the medieval and post-medieval period, the south-east part of the site was inhabited, at one point being used as a forester's lodge. The centre of the fort has been cultivated since at least the 19th century, still undergoes ploughing, and was used as a quarry.

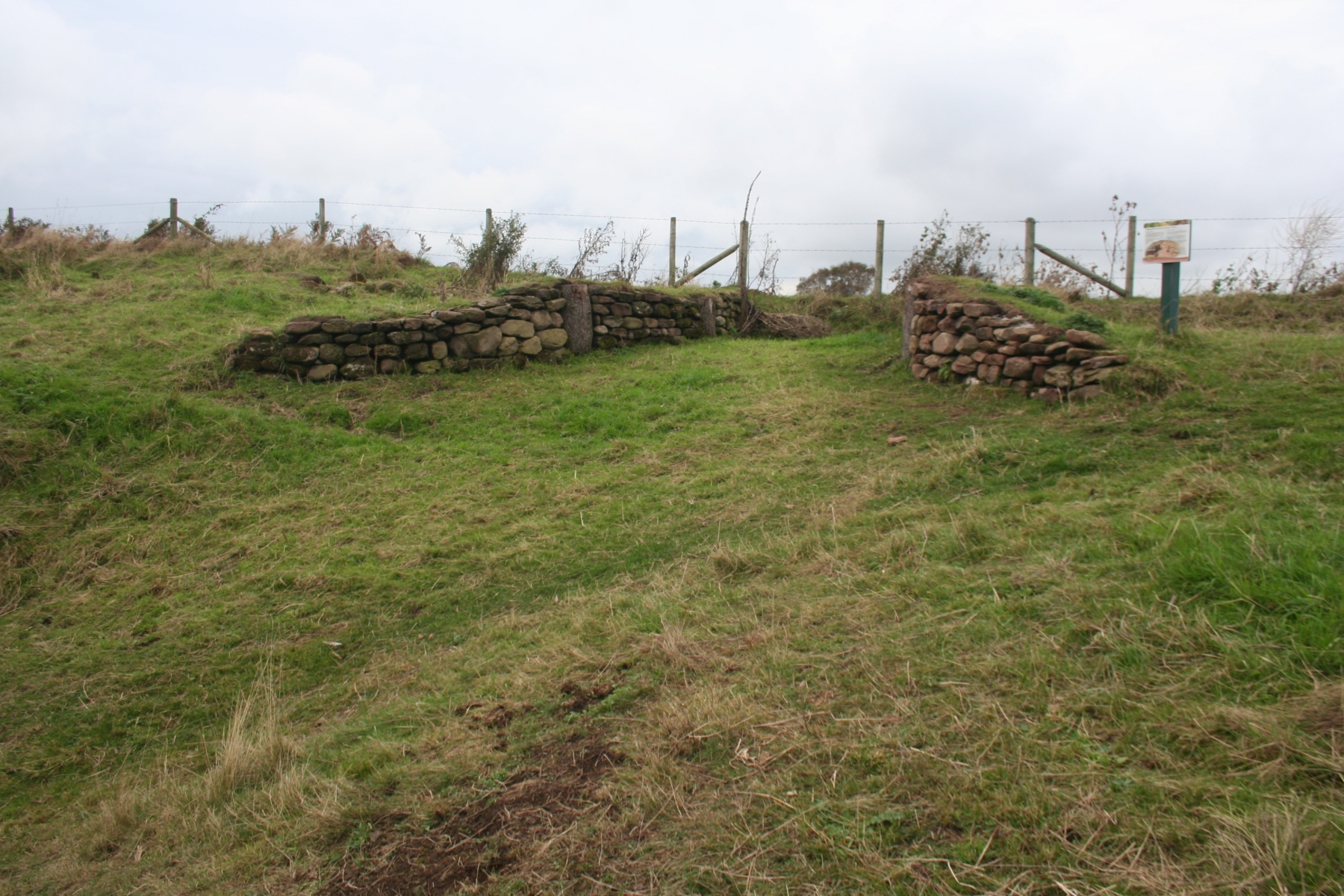
The reconstructed eastern gateway

Eddisbury was excavated between 1935 and 1938 by W. J. Varley, who also undertook excavations at Maiden Castle nearby, as part of his investigation into the origin of Cheshire's hill forts. The structure was made a Scheduled Ancient Monument in 1995, giving Eddisbury protection against unauthorised change. The eastern entrance was re-excavated by the Habitats and Hillforts Project in 2010, finds including sling stones and a saddle quern. The excavated walls were partially reconstructed and remain visible.

The site has been assessed as being "at high risk" due to ploughing on the site, causing erosion. Five of Cheshire's seven hill forts have been assessed as being "at high risk" compared to 15% of North West England's Scheduled Monuments. Although the western and northern parts of Eddisbury are owned by the Forestry Commission, the rest of the site is part of Old Pale Farm.

== In fiction ==
Eads Byrig is a burh that is fought over in Bernard Cornwell's novel Warriors of the Storm.

== See also ==
- Hillforts in Britain
- List of hill forts in England
- Scheduled Monuments in Cheshire (pre-1066)
