= Kelsborrow Castle =

Iron Age hillfort in Cheshire, England

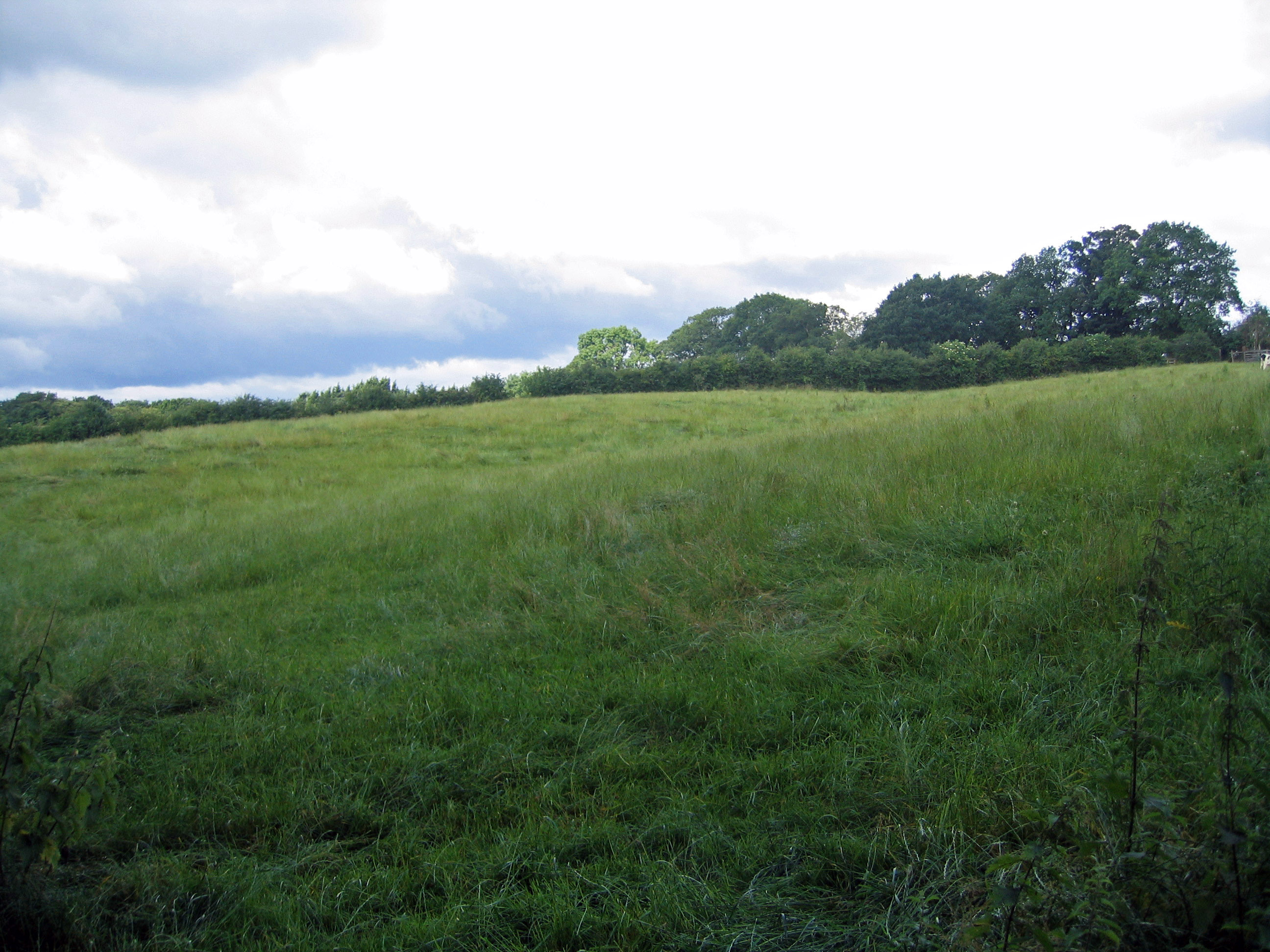
- The former ramparts of Kelsborrow Castle

- Location within Cheshire

General information
- Architectural style: Iron Age hillfort
- Location: England
- Coordinates: 53.2034°N 2.702097°W

Technical details
- Size: 9 acres (4 ha)

Kelsborrow Castle is an Iron Age hill fort in Cheshire, northern England. Hill forts were fortified hill-top settlements constructed across Britain during the Iron Age. It is one of only seven hill forts in the county of Cheshire and was probably in use for only a short time. In the 19th century, a bronze palstave was recovered from the site. It is protected as a Scheduled Ancient Monument.

== Location ==
Although there are over 1,300 hill forts in England, most are concentrated in southern England, and there are only seven in Cheshire. Along with Eddisbury and Oakmere, Kelsborrow forms a small cluster of Iron Age hill forts within 3 miles (5 km) of each other, near the Mouldsworth Gap, a break in the central ridge that runs north–south through Cheshire. The hill forts at Eddisbury and Oakmere lie to the north-east and east respectively. Kelsborrow Castle is located at grid reference SJ53176752, 400 ft (120 m) above sea level. The site overlooks the Cheshire Plain to the west, south-west, and south. There is high ground immediately to the east of Kelsborrow Castle, rising to a height of 500 ft (150 m).

== Layout ==
As well as being a hill fort, Kelsborrow Castle is a type of promontory fort, as it exploits the natural steep slopes of the area to create a defensive site. The site is surrounded by an artificial bank and ditch, although there is a gap in the ditch for around 400 ft (120 m) in the west. This is probably because the ground slopes sharply away where there is no ditch. The best surviving parts of the bank are 6 ft (1.8 m) high, and the distance between the outer edge of the ditch and the inner edge of the rampart is 100 ft (30 m). The defences cover 1.75 acres (0.71 ha), and enclose an area of 7.25 acres (2.93 ha). The entrance of the fort is probably in the south-east. Multivallate (more than one series of earthworks) forts are common in southern England; that Kelsborrow Castle is single vallate (i.e. it has only one ditch and bank) means it is probably a one-phase site, indicating it would only have been used for a short time. The hill fort is similar in typology to the hill forts at Bradley, and Oakmere, in Cheshire, and Castercliff and Portfield in Lancashire.

== Preservation and current state ==
Geophysical surveys and small-scale archaeological excavations in 1973 and 1996 indicated that there may be structures such as storage pits buried within the hill fort. The site is part of wider agricultural land and suffers erosion from vehicles and livestock movement. Animal burrows and the spread of bracken also pose a threat to the site. Although the site is designated as "at low risk", a more recent survey has suggested changing it to "at high risk" because of activities such as ploughing at Kelsborrow Castle. Five of the hill forts in Cheshire have been assessed as being "at high risk" compared to 15% of North West England's Scheduled Monuments.

== See also ==
- Scheduled Monuments in Cheshire (pre-1066)
