= Maiden Castle, Cheshire =

Hillfort in Cheshire, England

Maiden Castle
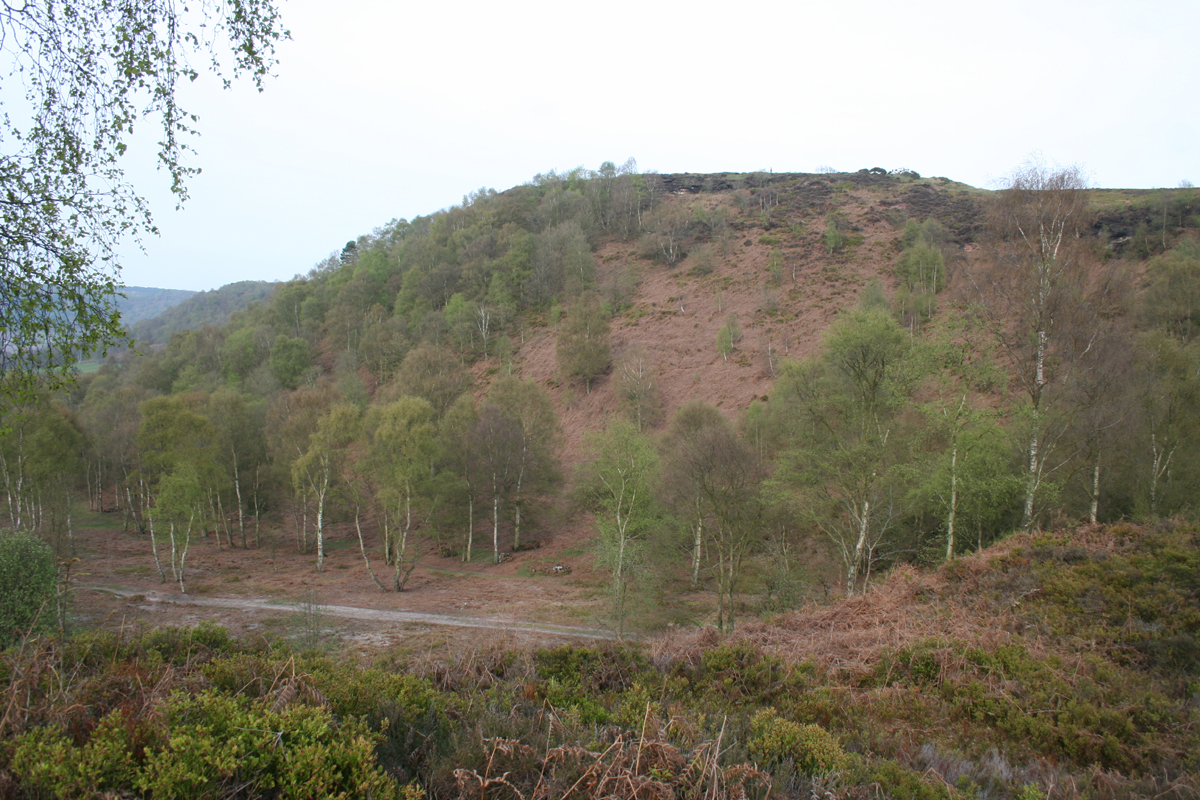
- Maiden Castle surmounting Bickerton Hill

- Location within Cheshire

General information
- Architectural style: Iron Age hill fort
- Location: England
- Coordinates: 53.071418°N 2.749951°W
- Construction started: 600 BC

Technical details
- Size: 1.66 acres (6,700 m^{2}) interior 3 acres (12,000 m^{2}) including defences

Maiden Castle is an Iron Age hill fort, one of many fortified hill-top settlements constructed across Britain during the Iron Age, but one of only seven in the county of Cheshire in northern England. The hill fort was probably occupied from its construction in 600 BC until the Roman conquest of Britain in the 1st century AD. At this time the Cornovii tribe are recorded to have occupied parts of the surrounding area but, because they left no distinctive pottery or metalworking, their occupation has not been verified. Since then it has been quarried and used for military exercises. It is protected as a Scheduled Ancient Monument, and is owned by the National Trust. The hill fort is open to visitors, but unrestricted access to the site has resulted in it being classified as "at high risk" from erosion.

== Location ==
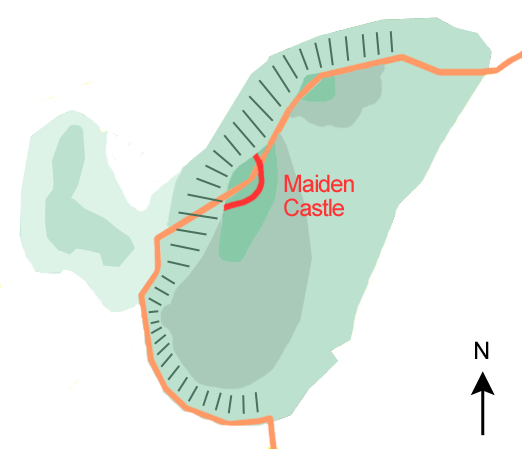
Sketch map showing Maiden Castle on the southerly Bickerton Hill. Depth of green shading indicates approximate elevation; thin dark green lines indicate escarpment; thick red line: earthworks; thick orange line: Sandstone Trail

Although there are over 1,300 hill forts in England, they are concentrated in the south of the country, with only seven in Cheshire. There are two groups of hill forts in Cheshire, each with three members, but Maiden Castle is the outlier, about 9 miles (14 km) south-south-west of the southernmost group. Located at grid reference SJ498529, Maiden Castle lies on the central ridge that runs north–south through the county, as do all of the hill forts in Cheshire.

Maiden Castle sits on a slight promontory which is the highest point of a plateau on Bickerton Hill, 694 ft (212 m). The ground to the west and north of the hill fort is steeply sloping, making artificial defences unnecessary and providing a commanding view of the Cheshire Plain. To the east of Maiden Castle, the plateau continues for about 1 mile (2 km) and 0.5 miles (800 m) wide, where ramparts were constructed in lieu of natural defences.

== Layout ==
Maiden Castle has no artificial defences on its northern and western sides because of the naturally steep slope of the hill, but there are two artificial banks, 35 ft (11 m) apart. The banks are similar in dimension, both are 40 ft (12 m) wide, and because the ground they are on slopes, the exterior side of each bank is higher than the side on the inside of the fort; they are 5 ft (1.5 m) high on the inside of the fort and 7 ft (2.1 m) on the exterior face. There is no evidence that Maiden Castle was protected by a ditch along with the banks. The main entrance is on the east side of the fort where the inner bank turns in towards the fort, and while there is a gap in the outer rampart it does not turn in. There may also be two other entrances to the site where the banks meet the cliffs to the north and south; the outer ditch runs inwards at both ends, possibly indicating an in-turned entrance abutting the edge of the cliff – similar to the entrance at the Helsby hill fort also in Cheshire – or perhaps an attempt to make the banks run flush to the cliff-edge to ensure there were no gaps in the site's defences.

== History ==
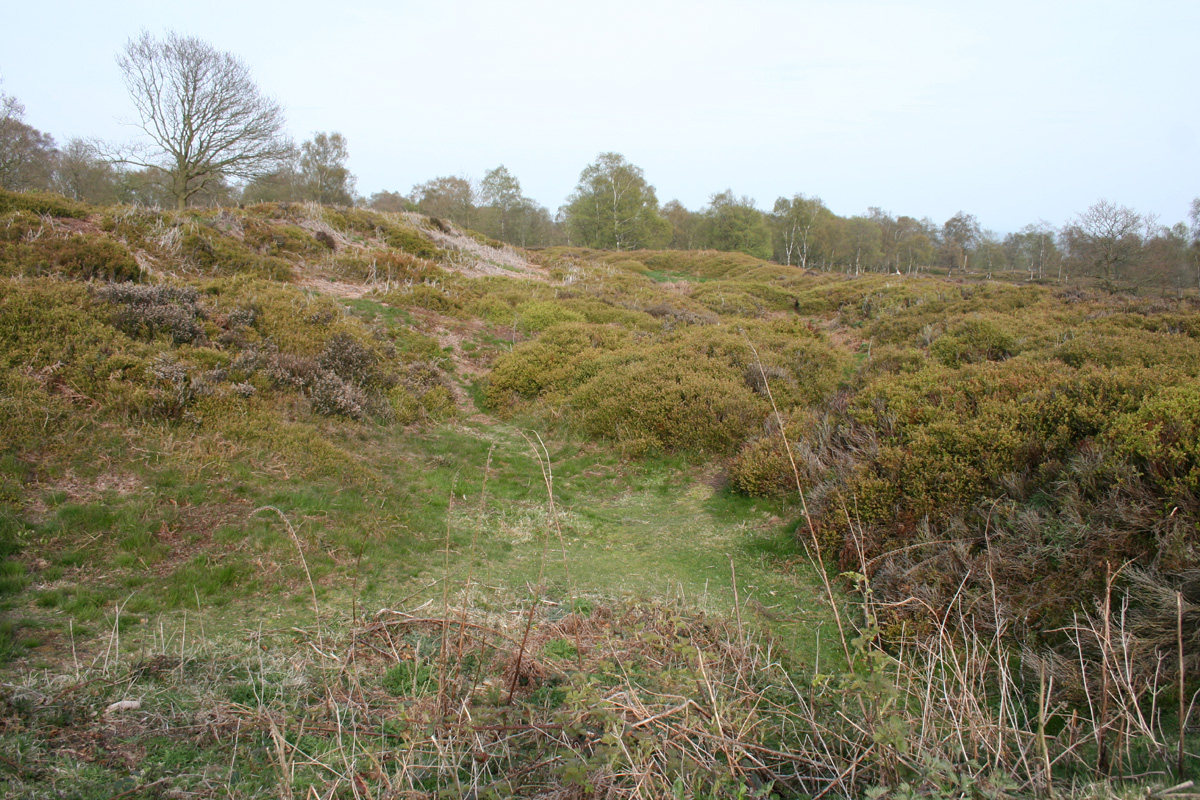
View between Maiden Castle's ramparts at the south west end

Radiocarbon dating indicates that the ramparts defending Maiden Castle were built in around 600 BC. Built from earth and timber, the inner rampart was originally 20 ft (6.1 m) wide, with a revetment of dry stone walling behind the bank, and at least 10 ft (3.0 m) high. The outer bank was originally 25 ft (7.6 m) wide and about 10 ft (3.0 m) high. It was built from sand and had a dry stone facing at the front and no revetment behind. The outer bank was later enlarged: the outer face was extended 8 to 10 ft (2.4 to 3.0 m) away from the fort and the revetment moved. Its height was probably increased to 12 ft (3.7 m). The defences cover about 1.66 acres (6,700 m^{2}) out of the entire 3 acres (12,000 m^{2}) of the Maiden Castle site. According to archaeologist James Forde-Johnston, who conducted a study of the hill forts of Lancashire and Cheshire in 1962, this was an unusually strong defence for such a small site. Few artefacts have been recovered from the site; they include a piece of Iron Age pottery. Maiden Castle was probably occupied until the Roman conquest of Britain in 1st century AD, and the outer bank may have been reconstructed around this time.

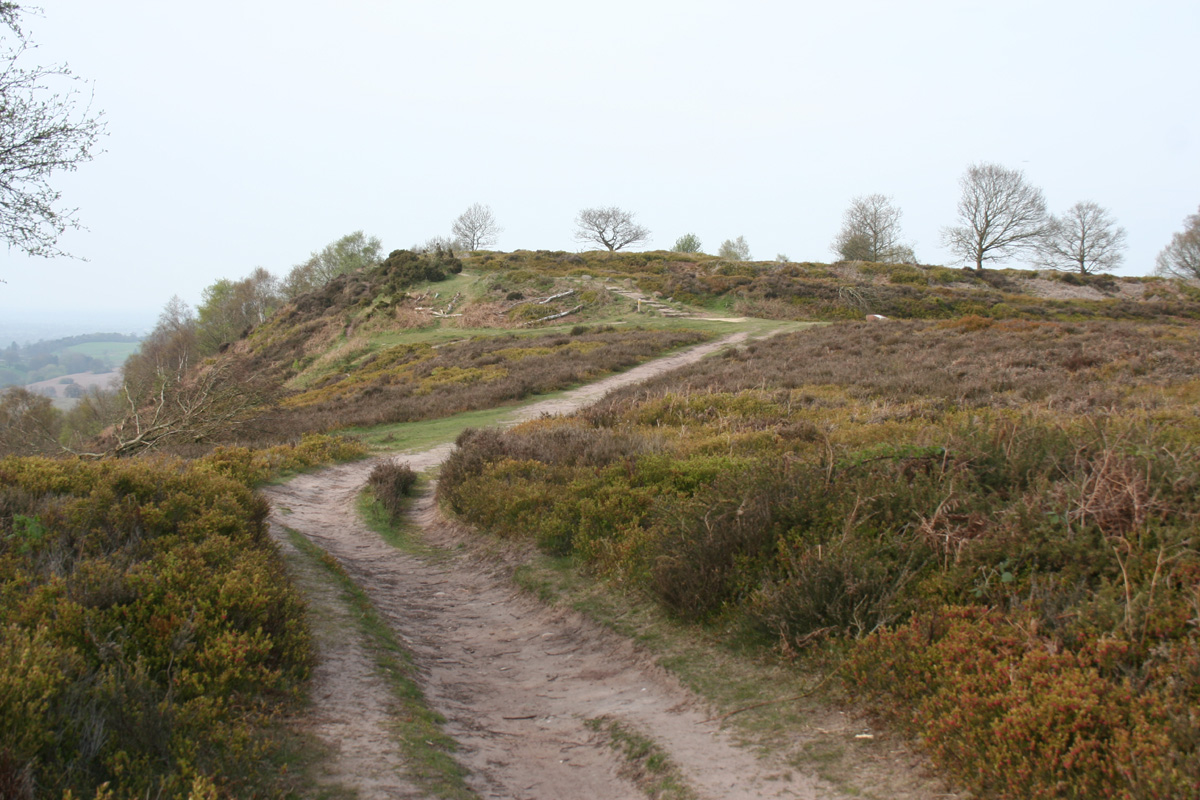
Promontory crowned with earthworks, viewed from the south

The name Maiden Castle is not unique to the site and occurs in several other places in Britain, such as Maiden Castle in Dorset, and probably means a "fortification that looks impregnable" or one that has never been taken in battle. Despite quarrying in the 17th century and 20th-century military exercises on the site, Maiden Castle survives well. It was excavated between 1932 and 1935 by W. J. Varley, who also undertook excavations at Eddisbury hill fort, as part of his investigation into the origin of Cheshire's hill forts. Further excavations were undertaken in 1980–1981. The structure was made a Scheduled Ancient Monument in 1995, giving Maiden Castle protection against unauthorised change. The environment of the hill fort is a mixture of heathland, heather, and bracken. The site is owned by the National Trust and is open to the public. Unrestricted access has led to problems such as erosion. Maiden Castle has been damaged by animal burrows and is designated as "at high risk" due to erosion caused by visitors and the spread of bracken. Five of Cheshire's seven hill forts have been assessed as being "at high risk" compared to 15% of North West England's Scheduled Monuments.

== See also ==
- Hillforts in Britain
- List of hill forts in England
- Scheduled Monuments in Cheshire (pre-1066)
