= Helsby hill fort =

Hillfort in Cheshire, England

Coordinates: 53.2732°N 2.7630°W

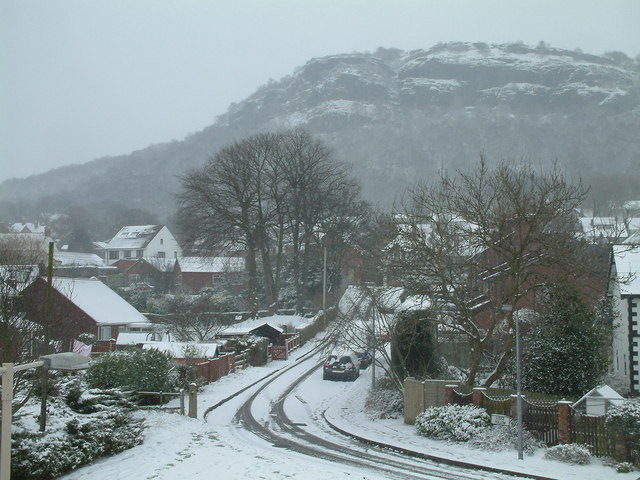
Helsby Hill, on which the hill fort sits

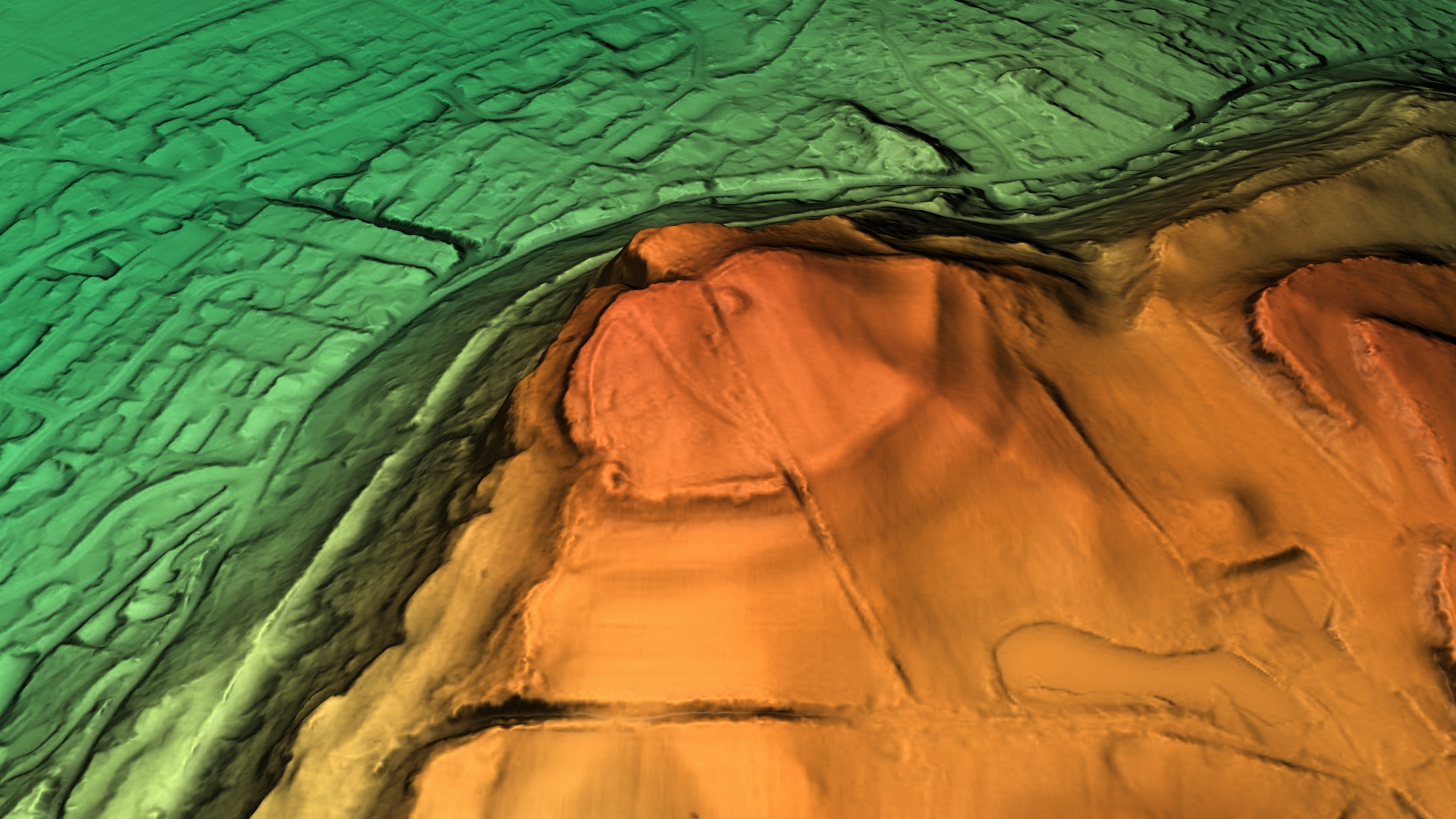
3D view of the digital terrain model

Helsby hill fort is an Iron Age hillfort overlooking the village of Helsby in Cheshire, northwest England. Helsby Hill has steep cliffs on the northern and western sides, providing a natural semicircular defence. Double rampart earthworks extend to the south and east to provide protection to those flanks. Two additional banks have been discovered enclosing a rock ledge on the cliff to the north side. Excavations last century revealed a wall composed of sand and rubble, revetted with stone to the back and front. The hill has a summit of 141 m AOD, and is a prominent landmark rising above the Cheshire Plain, with fine views overlooking the Mersey Estuary and into Wales. Much of the hill is owned and managed by the National Trust. The surrounding areas are well wooded to the southwest, northwest and northeast with farmland to the southeast. The hill fort is protected as a Scheduled Ancient Monument.

== Location ==
The site is to the east of the large village and civil parish of Helsby, in the unitary authority of Cheshire West and Chester and the ceremonial county of Cheshire.

- Map sources for Helsby hill fort

== See also ==
- List of Scheduled Monuments in Cheshire dated to before 1066
