= List of hillforts in England =

There are 1,224 hill forts in England. Although some originate in the Bronze Age, the majority of hill forts in Britain were constructed during the Iron Age (about 8th century BC to the Roman conquest of Britain). There was a trend in the 2nd century BC for hill forts to fall out of use.

== Bedfordshire ==
- Billington Camp
- Caesar's Camp, Sandy
- Conger Hill
- Galley Hill
- Maiden Bower
- Mowsbury Hill
- Sharpenhoe Clappers

== Berkshire ==
- Borough Hill
- Bussock Camp,
- Caesar's Camp
- Grimsbury Castle
- Membury Camp
- Perborough Castle
- Walbury Hill
- Ramsbury Corner, Cold Ash, Berkshire

== Bristol ==
- Aldebury
- Blaise Castle
- Clifton Down Promontory Fort
- Kingsweston Hill

== Buckinghamshire ==
- Aylesbury
- Boddington Camp
- Bulstrode Park Camp
- Cheddington
- Cholesbury Camp
- Church Hill, West Wycombe
- Danesborough Camp
- Desborough Castle
- Gerrards Cross
- Ivinghoe
- Keep hill
- Kimbles
- Maid's Moreton
- Medmenham Camp
- Medmenham (Danesfield Camp)
- Norbury
- Pulpit Hill
- Seven Ways Plain (Burnham Beeches)
- Southend Hill
- States House Hillfort
- Taplow
- West Wycombe Camp
- Whelpley Hill

== Cambridgeshire ==
- Belsar's Hill
- Borough Hill, Sawston
- Stonea Camp
- Wandlebury Hill
- War Ditches
- Wardy Hill

== Cheshire ==
- Beeston Castle
- Bradley hill fort
- Burton Point
- Castle Ditch, Delamere
- Eddisbury hill fort
- Helsby hill fort
- Kelsborrow Castle
- Maiden Castle
- Oakmere hill fort
- Woodhouses hill fort

== Cleveland ==
- Eston Nab

== Cornwall ==
- Allabury, St Agnes Beacon, St Allen, Ash Bury,
- Bury Castle, Bury Down, Lanreath, Blacketon Rings, Bosigran,
- Cadson Bury, Caer Bran, Caer Dane, Carn Brea, Castallack Round, Castle Dore, Castle Goff, Castle an Dinas, St. Columb Major, Castle Killibury Camp (also known as Kelly Rounds), Castle Pencaire (Breage), Chûn Castle, Crane Castle, St Cuby's Church,
- Dean Point, Demelza Castle, St Dennis Hill Fort, Dingerein Castle, Dodman Point, St Dominick Hillfort, Dunmere fort, Dunterton Hillfort,
- Faughan,
- Gear fort, Giant's Castle, Golden Camp, Gurnard's Head,
- Hall Rings, Helbury Castle, Hilton Wood Castle,
- Kelsey Head, Kenidjack Castle, Kenwyn Hillfort, Kestle Rings,
- Ladock Hillfort, Largin Castle, Lescudjack Hill Fort, Lesingey Round, Liveloe,
- Maen Castle,
- Nattlebury St Newlyn East, St Newlyn East (Fiddlers Green),
- Padderbury, Pencarrow Rounds, Penhargard Castle, Polyphant Hillfort, Prideaux Castle, Prospidnick Hill,
- Rame Head, Redcliff Castle, Resugga Castle, Rough Tor, Round Wood, The Rumps,
- Stowe's Pound, St Stephens Beacon,
- Tregarrick Tor, Trereen Dinas, Tregeare Rounds, Trelaske hillfort, Trencrom Hill, Treryn Dinas, Tresawsen (Perranzabuloe), Trevelgue Head, Trewinnion, Trewardreva, Treyarnon fort,
- Warbstow Bury,
- Yearle's Wood

== County Durham ==
- Humbledon Hill
- Maiden Castle
- Shackleton Beacon
- The Castles Bedburn

== Cumbria ==
- Allen Knott (Troutbeck),
- Black Castle Hill,
- Carrock Fell, Castle Crag (Borrowdale), Castle Crag (Haweswater), Castle Crag (Thirlmere), Castle Head hillfort, Castle How Hillfort, Castle Howe, Castlesteads (Askham), Castlesteads (Natland), Croglam Castle,
- Dunmallard Hillfort, Dyke House fort,
- Kingmoor, Knipe Scar, Thrimby,
- Recastle Crag,
- Stainton Hillfort, Swarthy Hill, Crosscanonby,

== Derbyshire ==
- Ball Cross, Borough Hill,
- Castle Naze (Combs Moss), Castle Ring, near Youlgreave. (Not associated with the fort of the same name in Staffordshire)
- Fin Cop,
- Mam Tor, Markland Grips, Mouselow Castle,

== Devon ==
- Beacon Castle, Belbury Castle, Berry Castle, Black Dog, Berry Castle, Weare Giffard, Berry Head, Berry camp, Berry's Wood, Blackbury Camp, Blackdown Rings, Bolt Tail, Boringdon Camp, Bremridge Wood, Brent Hill, Brent Tor, Burley Wood, Burridge Fort
- Cadbury Castle, Devon, Capton, Castle Close, Castle Dyke, Little Haldon, Castle Head, Devon, Castle Hill, Torrington, Clovelly Dykes, Cotley Castle, Cranbrook Castle, Cranmore Castle, Cunnilear Camp
- Denbury Hill, Dewerstone, Dolbury, Dumpdon Hill, Embury Beacon
- Halwell Camp, Hawkesdown Hill, Hembury, Hembury Castle, Tythecott, High Peak, Devon, Hillsborough, Devon, Holbury, Holbeton, Holne Chase Castle, Huntsham castle
- Kentisbury Down, Killerton, Knowle Hill Castle,
- Lee Wood
- Membury Castle, Milber Down, Mockham Down, Musbury Castle, Myrtlebury
- Newberry Castle, Noss, Dartmouth,
- Peppercombe Castle, Posbury, Prestonbury castle
- Raddon Top, Roborough Castle,
- Seaton Down, Shoulsbury castle, Sidbury Castle, Slapton Castle, Smythapark, Stanborough, Stockland Castle, Stoke Hill
- Voley Castle,
- Wasteberry Camp, Wind Hill, Windbury Head, Woodbury Castle, Woodbury, Dartmouth, Wooston Castle,
- Yarrowbury, Yellowberries Copse

== Dorset ==
- Abbotsbury Castle, Allington, Dorset,
- Badbury Rings, Banbury Hill, Bindon Hill, Buzbury Rings
- Chalbury Hillfort, Coney's Castle,
- Dungeon Hill,
- Eggardon Hill,
- Flower's Barrow,
- Hambledon Hill, Hod Hill,
- Lambert's Castle, Lewesdon Hill,
- Maiden Castle,
- Pilsdon Pen, Poundbury Hill
- Rawlsbury Camp
- The Verne, Portland – destroyed in the mid-1800s due to modern fortifications
- Woodbury Hill, Woolsbarrow Hillfort

== East Sussex ==
- Hollingbury Castle
- Mount Caburn

== Essex ==
- Ambresbury Banks
- Danbury, Essex
- Little Baddow
- Loughton Camp

== Gloucestershire ==
- Abbey Camp
- Bagendon hillfort
- Brackenbury Ditches
- Bloody Acre
- Bury Hill, Winterbourne
- Camp Hill, Thornbury
- Cleeve Hill
- Crickley Hill
- Dyrham Camp
- Elberton Camp
- Horton Camp
- Little Sodbury
- Lydney Park
- Knole Park Camp
- Solsbury Hill
- The Castle, Tytherington
- Tog Hill, Cold Ashton
- Uley Bury
- Welshbury Hill

== Greater Manchester ==
- Mellor hill fort

== Hampshire ==
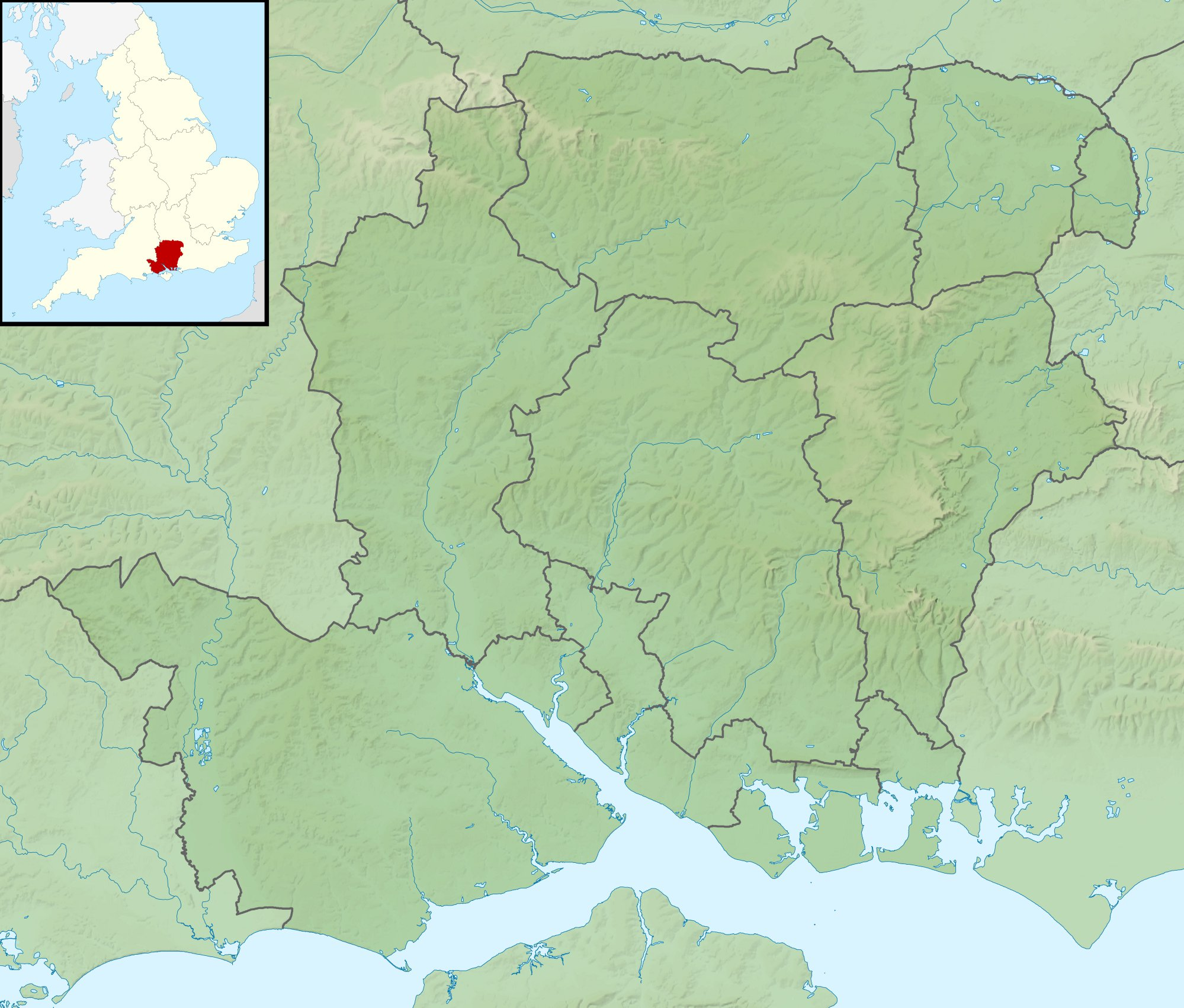
Hillforts in Hampshire, England
- Ashleys Copse
- Balksbury, Beacon Hill, Bevisbury, Buckland Rings, Bullsdown Camp, Bury Hill
- Caesar's Camp, Castle Hill, Chilworth Ring
- Danebury, Dunwood Camp
- Frankenbury Camp, The Frith
- Gorley Hill
- Hamble Common Camp
- Knoll Camp
- Ladle Hill, Lockerley Camp
- Merdon Castle
- Norsebury Ring
- Old Winchester Hill, Oliver's Battery, Oram's Arbour
- Quarley Hill
- St. Catherine's Hill
- Tidbury Ring, Toothill Fort, Tourner Bury
- Whitsbury Castle, Winklebury, Woolbury

== Herefordshire ==
- Aconbury Camp
- British Camp
- Camp Coppice, Castle Frome
- Capler Camp
- Chase Hill, Ross on Wye
- Credenhill
- Croft Ambrey
- Dinedor Camp
- Dinmore Hill
- Ivington Camp
- Midsummer Hill
- Poston Camp
- Risbury
- Sutton Walls Hill Fort
- Uphampton Camp
- Wapley Hill

== Hertfordshire ==
- Arbury Banks
- The Aubreys
- Ravensburgh Castle
- Wilbury Hill
- Wallbury Camp

== Kent ==
- Bigbury Camp
- Oldbury hillfort
- Squerreys Park Early Iron Age Hillfort

== Lancashire ==
- Castercliff
- Portfield
- Warton Crag

== Leicestershire ==
- Beacon Hill
- Breedon hill fort
- Burrough Hill

== Norfolk ==
- Bloodgate Hill Iron Age Fort
- Holkham Camp
- Warham Camp

== North Yorkshire ==
- Stanwick Iron Age Fortifications
- Sutton Bank
- Ingleborough
- Roulston Scar
- Scarborough Castle - originally the site of a hillfort.

== Northamptonshire ==
- Arbury Hill
- Borough Hill
- Hunsbury Hill or Danes Camp
- Rainsborough Camp

== Northumberland ==
- Callaly Castle
- Castle Knowe
- Ewe Hill
- Gibbs Hill
- Great Hetha
- Greaves Ash
- Humbleton Hill
- Little Cleugh
- Lordenshaws
- Old Fawdon Hill
- Prendwick Chesters
- West Hill
- Yeavering Bell

== Oxfordshire ==
- Alfred's Castle (part of Berkshire until 1974),
- Badbury Hill (part of Berkshire until 1974),
- Blewburton Hill (part of Berkshire until 1974),
- Chastleton Barrow,
- Cherbury Camp (part of Berkshire until 1974),
- Dyke Hills,
- Knollbury,
- Eynsham Hall Camp,
- Hardwell Castle,
- Ilbury,
- Lyneham Camp, also called The Roundabout,
- Madmarston Hill,
- Segsbury Camp (part of Berkshire until 1974),
- Tadmarton Heath,
- Uffington Castle (part of Berkshire until 1974),
- Wittenham Clumps (part of Berkshire until 1974)

== Shropshire ==
- Abdon Burf
- Bayston Hill,
- The Berth, Baschurch,
- Bury Ditches,
- Bury Walls,
- Burf Castle
- Caer Caradoc,
- Caus Castle,
- Clee Burf,
- Caer Caradoc (Chapel Lawn),
- Caynham Camp
- Ebury Hill,
- Earl's Hill
- Middletown Hill
- Nesscliffe,
- Nordy Bank
- Old Oswestry
- Titterstone Clee Hill
- The Wrekin

== Somerset ==
- Backwell Hillfort, Banwell Camp, Bat's Castle, Bathampton Down, Berwick, Black Ball Camp, Blacker's Hill, Brean Down, Brent Knoll, Burgh Walls Camp, Burrington Camp, Burledge Hill, Bury Castle,
- Cadbury Camp (Tickenham), Cadbury Castle (South Cadbury), Cadbury Hill (Congresbury), Cannington Camp, Castle Neroche, Clatworthy Camp, Cleeve Toot, Compton Dundon, Conygar Hillfort, Cow Castle,
- Daw's Castle, Dinghurst fort, Dolebury Warren, Dowsborough,
- Elworthy Barrows, Elborough Hill,
- Ham Hill, Highbury Hill,
- Kenwalch's Castle, Kingsdown Camp,
- Little Down,
- Maes Knoll, Maesbury Castle,
- Norton Camp,
- Plainsfield Camp,
- Ruborough Camp,
- Small Down Knoll, Stantonbury Camp, Sweetworthy,
- Taps Combe Camp, Trendle Ring, Tunley Camp
- Wain's Hill, Clevedon, Worlebury Camp

== South Yorkshire ==
- Carl Wark,
- Wincobank (hill fort)

== Staffordshire ==
- Berth Hill
- Bunbury hillfort
- Bury Bank
- Bury Ring
- Castle Ring
- Kinver Edge Hillfort

== Surrey ==
- Anstiebury Camp
- Botany Hill
- Caesar's Camp, Rushmoor and Waverley
- Caesar's Camp, Wimbledon Common
- The Cardinal's Cap, or War Coppice Camp
- Hascombe Hill
- Holmbury Hill

== Warwickshire ==
- Barnmoor Wood Camp
- Beausale camp (Camp Hill)
- Corley Camp
- Meon Hill
- Nadbury Camp
- Oakley Wood Camp
- Oldberrow, Warwickshire
- Oldbury Camp, Warwickshire
- Wappenbury Camp
- Harborough Banks
- Thornton Farm
- Foxhill, Warwickshire
- Priory Park, Warwickshire
- Hoo Hill
- Warwensmere Road

== West Midlands ==
- Castle Old Fort, Stonnall
- Wednesbury
- Wychbury Ring

== West Sussex ==
- Chanctonbury Ring
- Cissbury Ring
- Highdown
- Thundersbarrow Hill
- Torberry Hill
- The Trundle, Chichester

== West Yorkshire ==
- Castle Hill, Huddersfield
- Barwick-in-Elmet Castle

== Wiltshire ==
- Barbury Castle, Battlesbury Camp, Bincknoll Castle (unproven), Bratton Camp, Bury Camp
- Castle Ditches, Casterley Camp, Castle Rings, Chisbury, Chiselbury, Chisenbury Camp, Clearbury Ring, Cley Hill, Codford Circle (also known as Oldbury Camp, Wilsbury Ring, and Woldsbury)
- Ebsbury
- Fosbury Camp, Figsbury Ring (unproven)
- Grovely Castle,
- Knook Castle
- Liddington Castle, Little Woodbury
- Caer Bladon (modern Malmesbury)
- Martinshill Fort, Membury Camp
- Ogbury Camp, Oldbury Camp (Cherhill Down), Old Sarum, Oliver's Castle (Roundway Down)
- Park Hill Camp
- Ringsbury Camp, Rybury
- Roundway Down (or Oliver's Camp)
- Scratchbury Camp, Sidbury Hill
- Vespasian's Camp
- Whitesheet Castle, Winklebury Camp
- Yarnbury Castle

== Worcestershire ==
- Berry Mound
- Bredon Hill
- Wychbury Ring
- Woodbury Hill

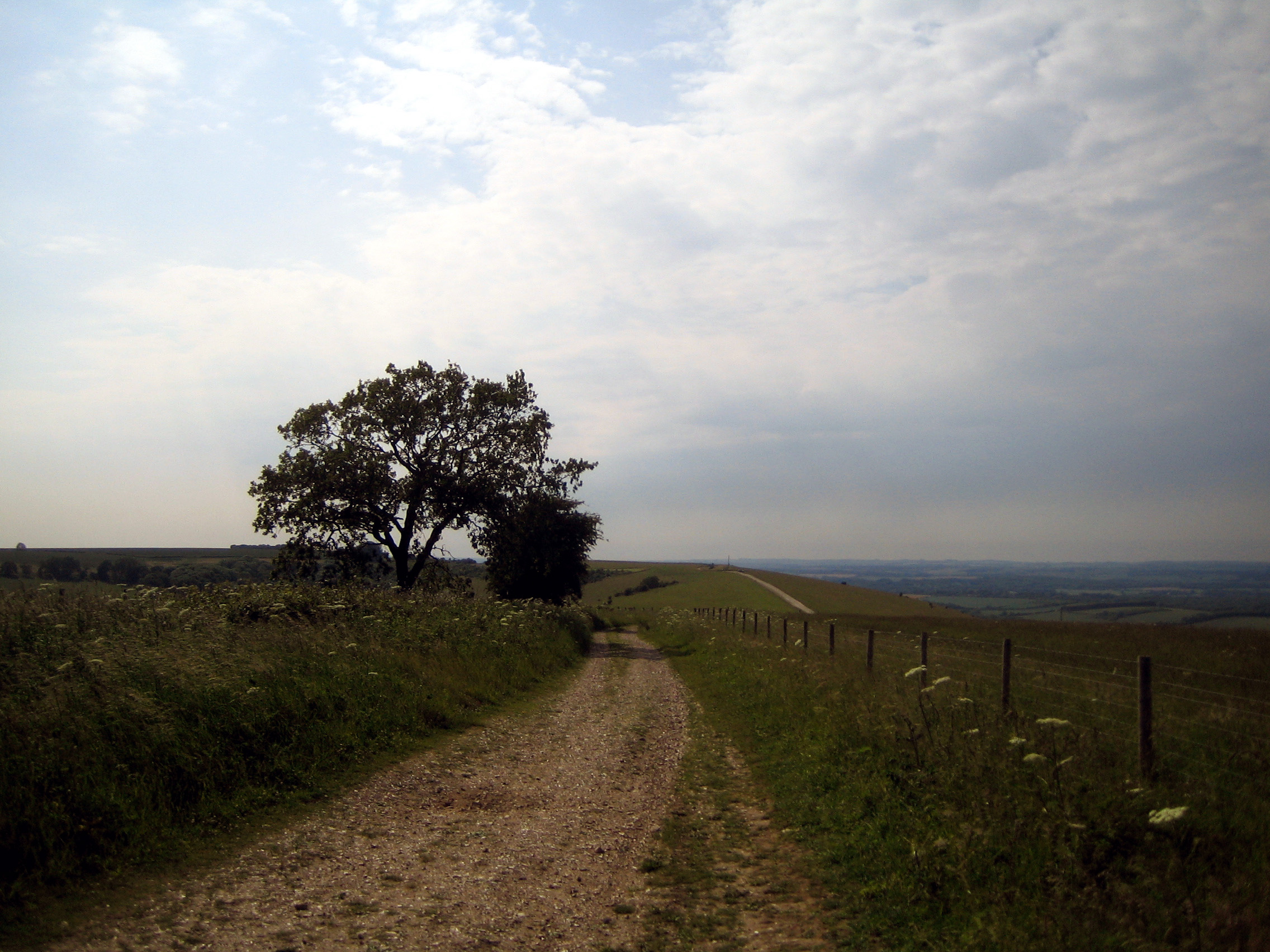
Walbury Hill, Berkshire

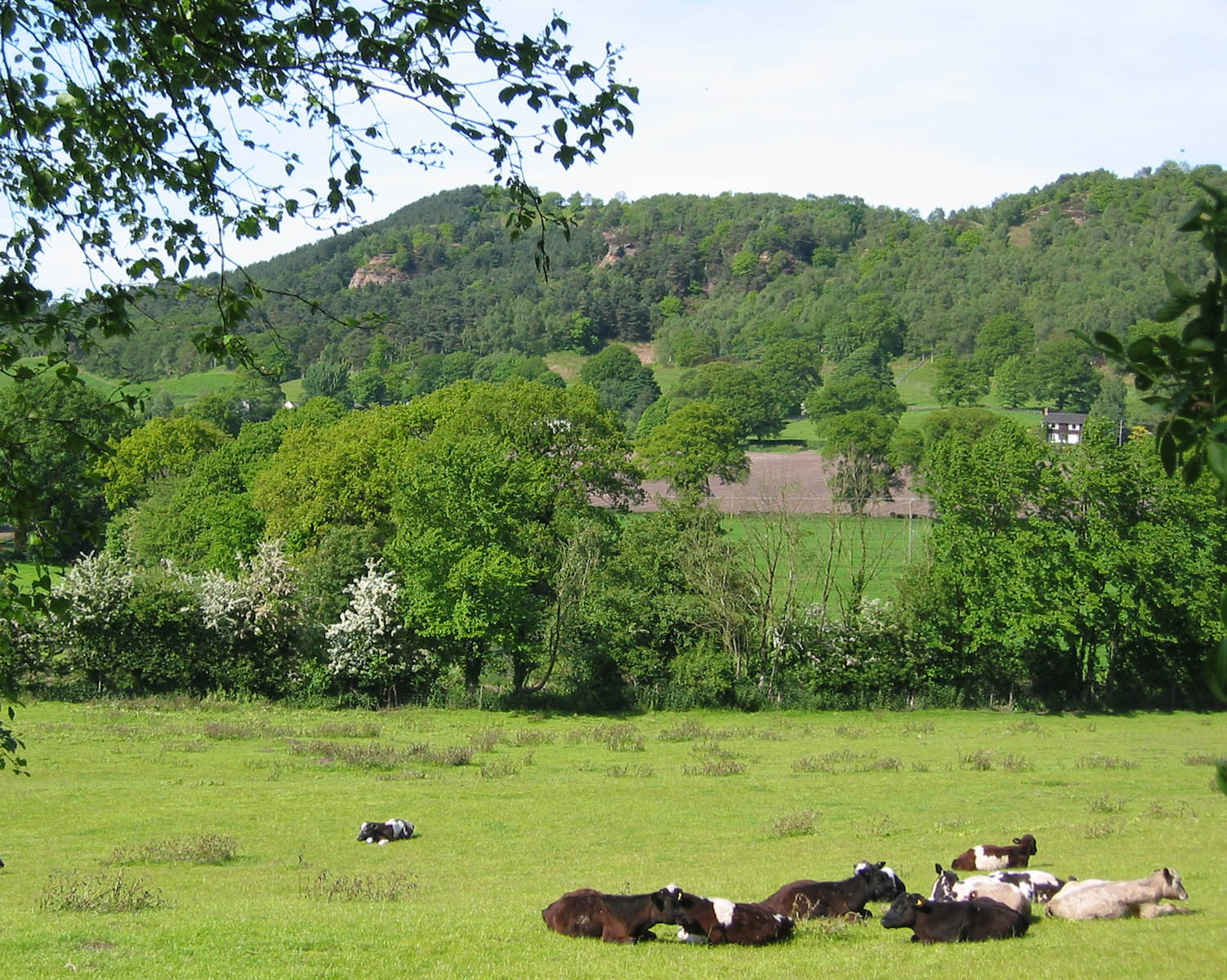
Bickerton Hill, Cheshire

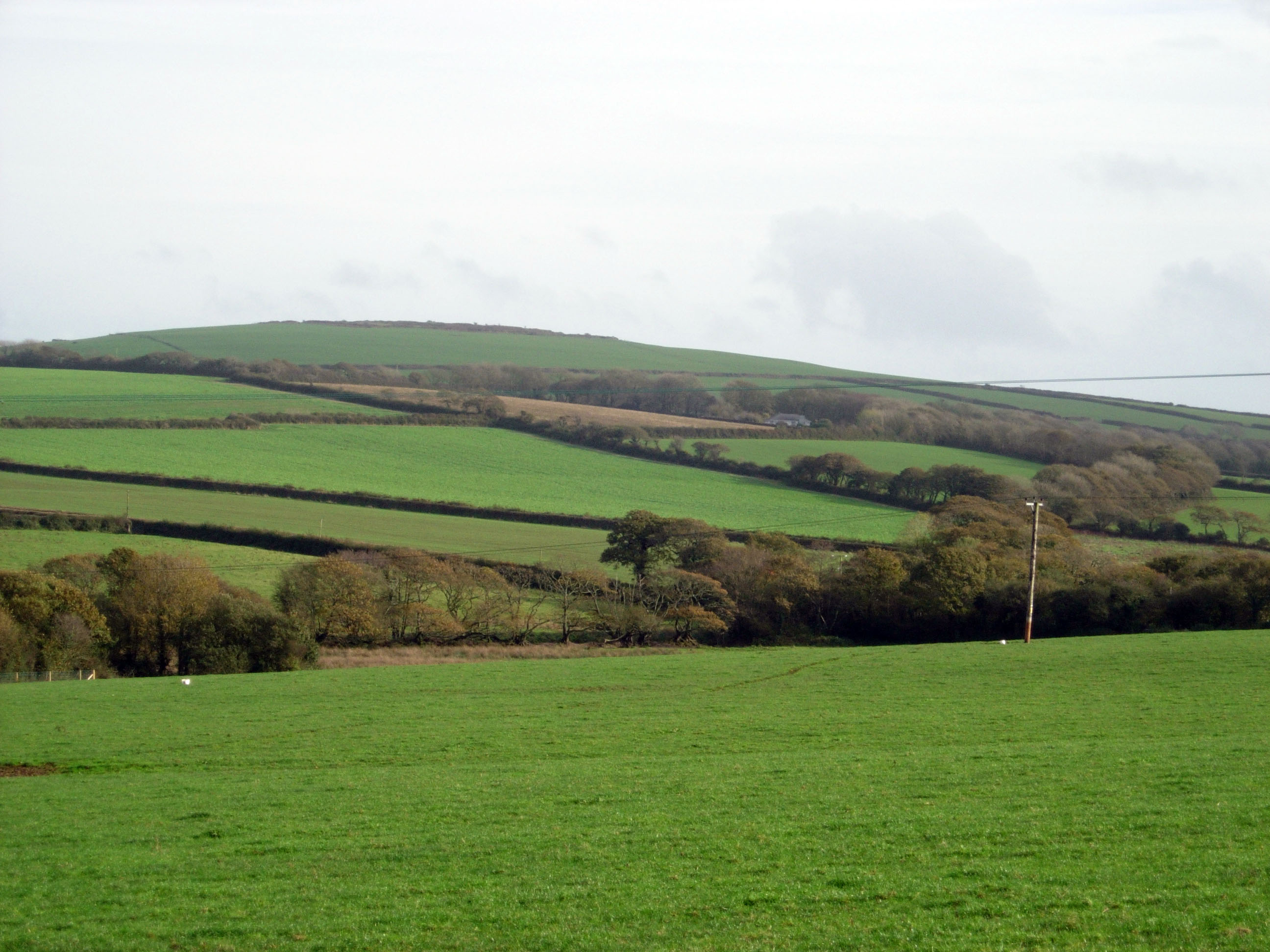
Castle an Dinas, Cornwall

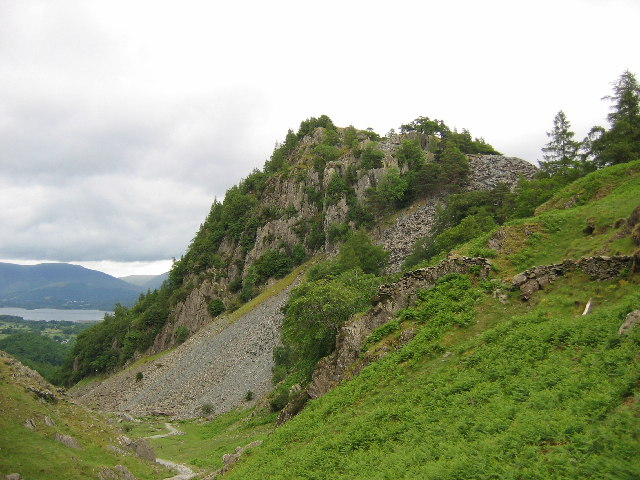
Castle Crag, Cumbria

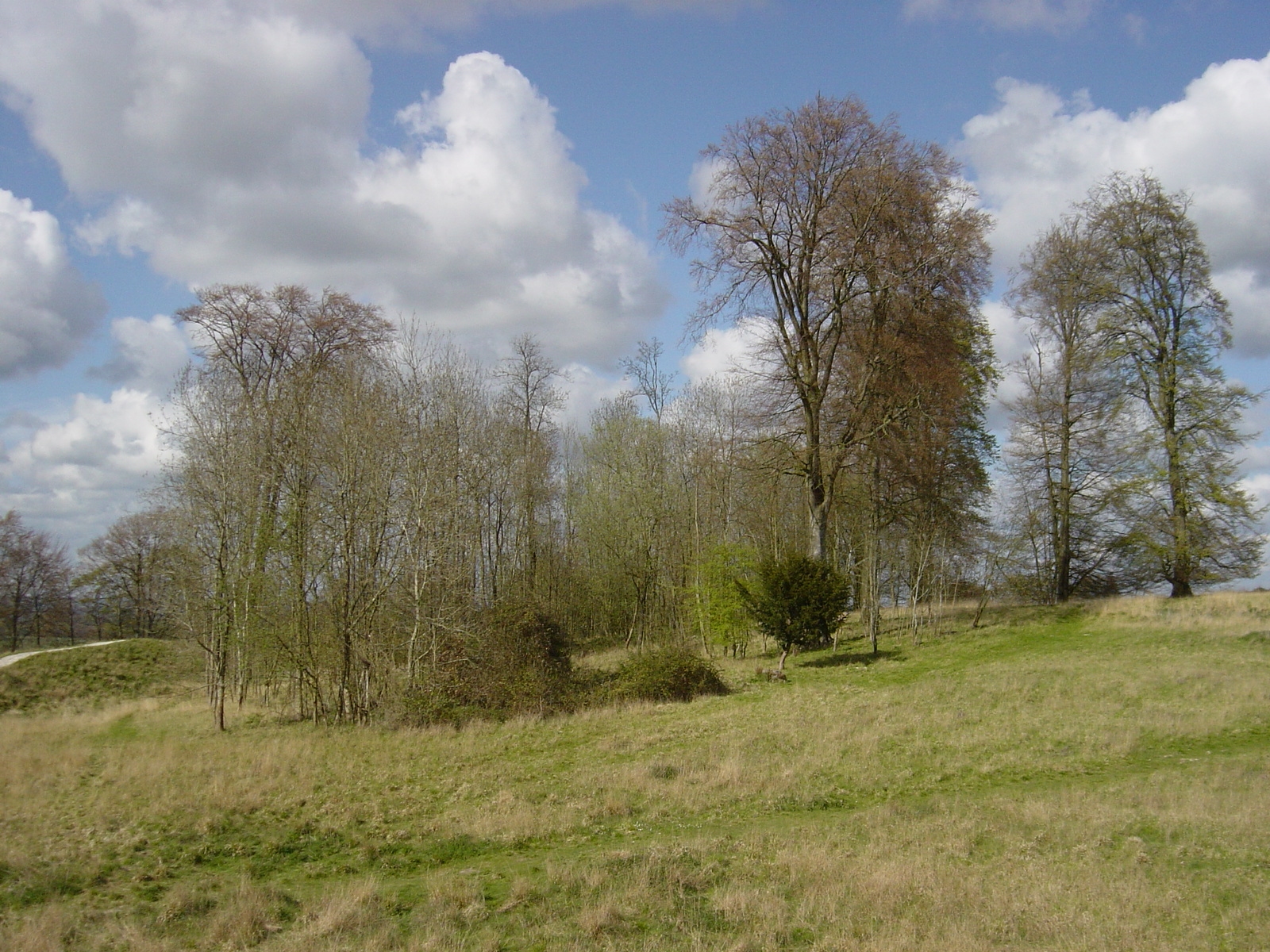
Danebury Ring

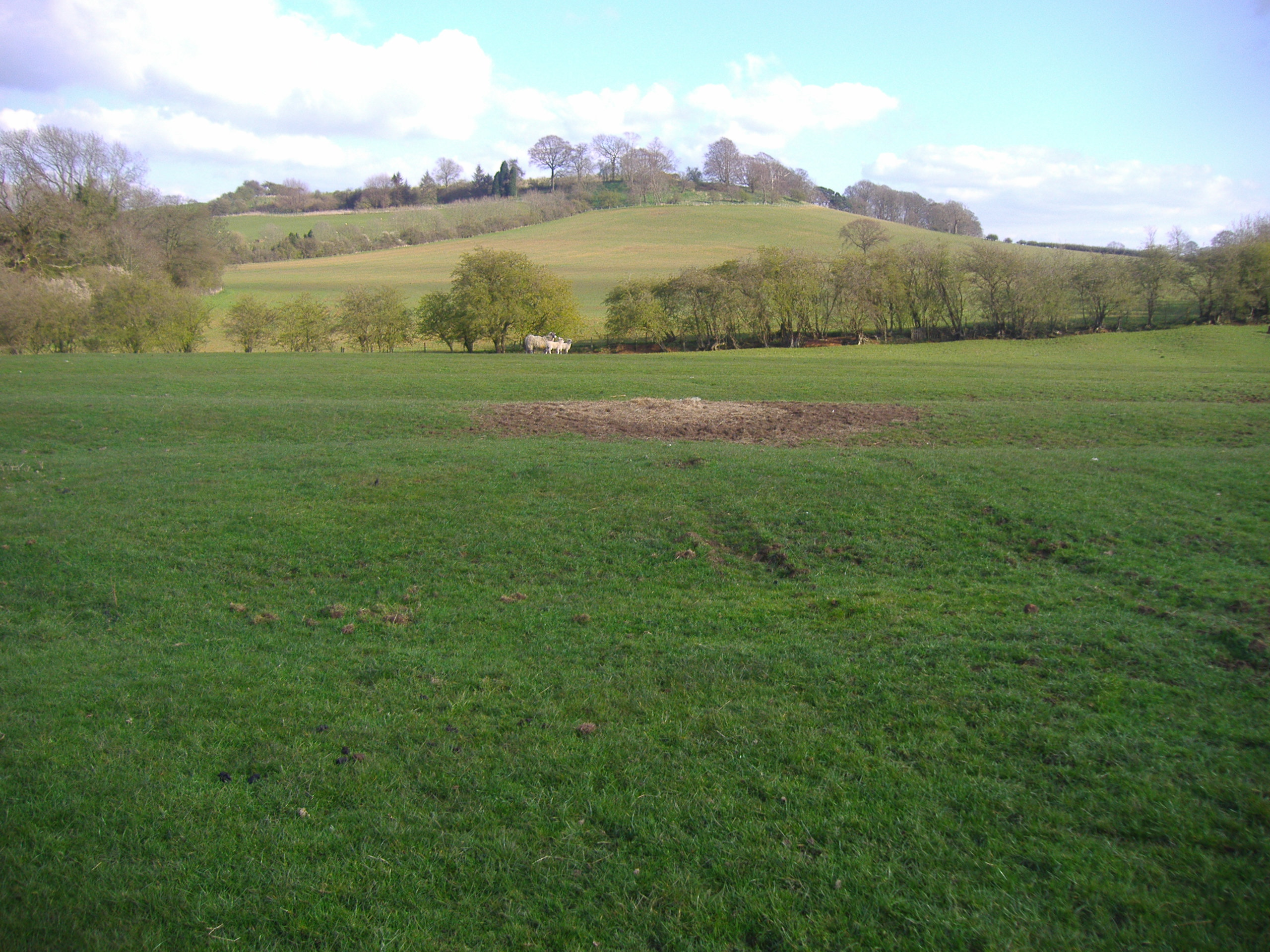
Arbury Hill

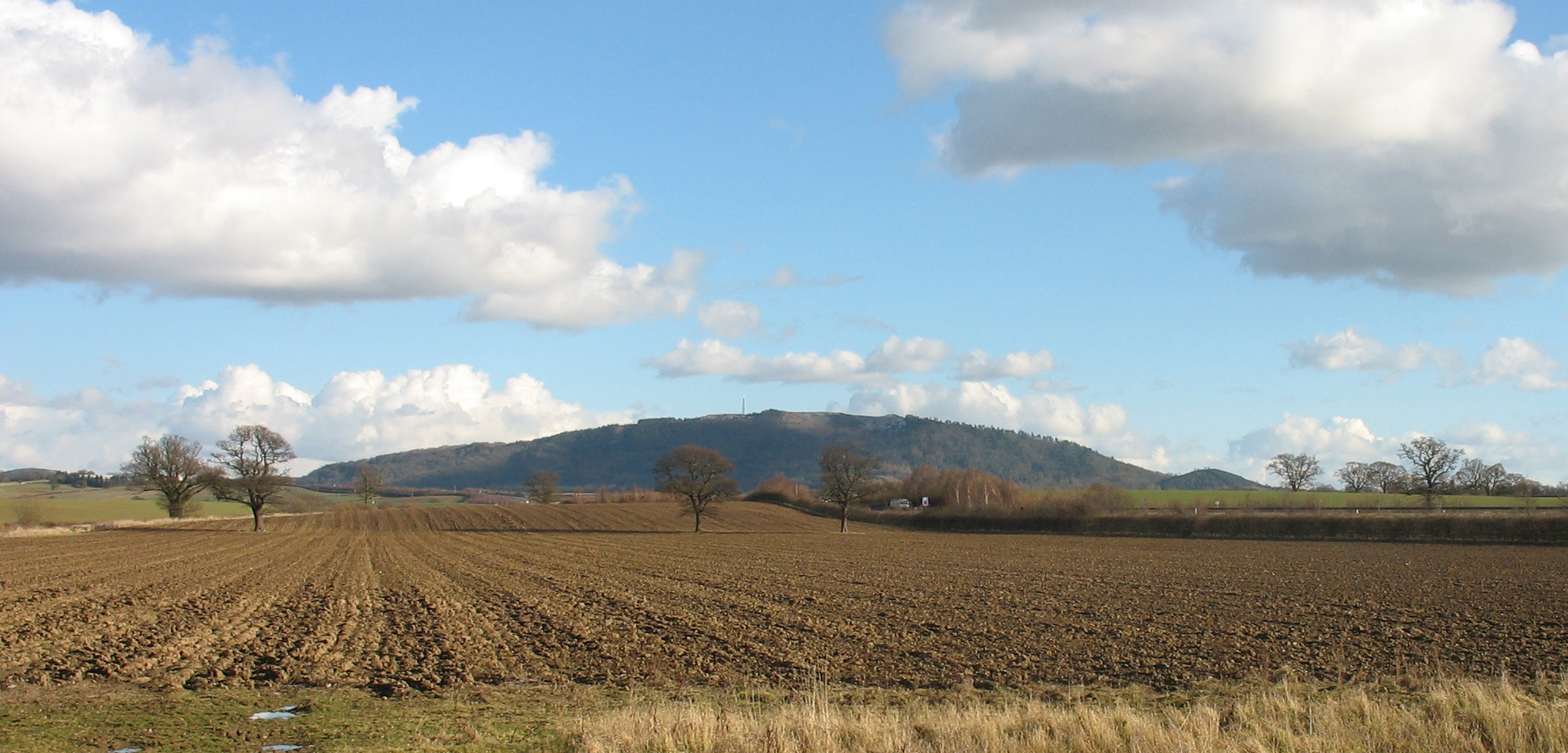
The Wrekin

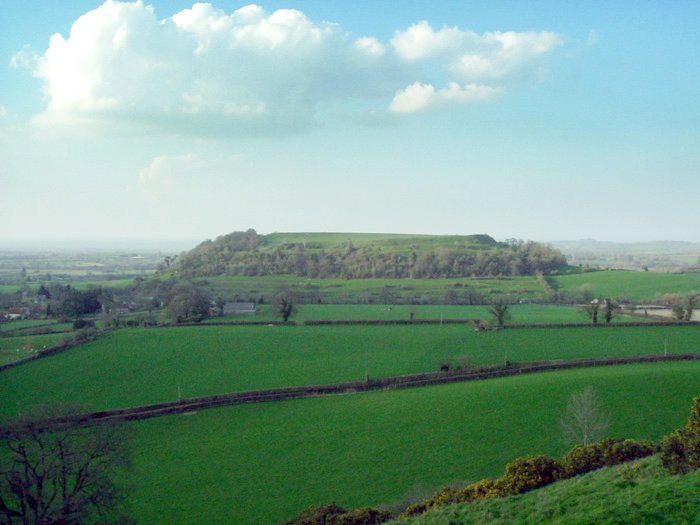
Cadbury Castle, Somerset

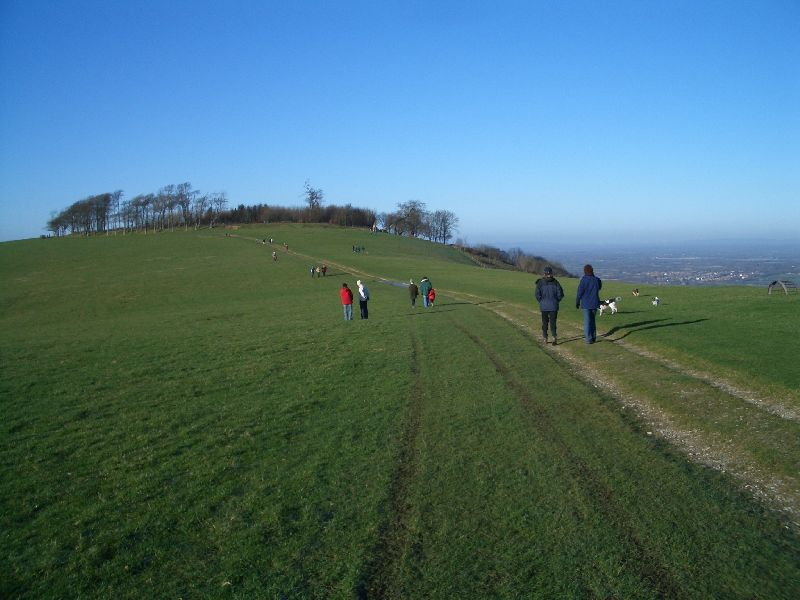
Chanctonbury Ring

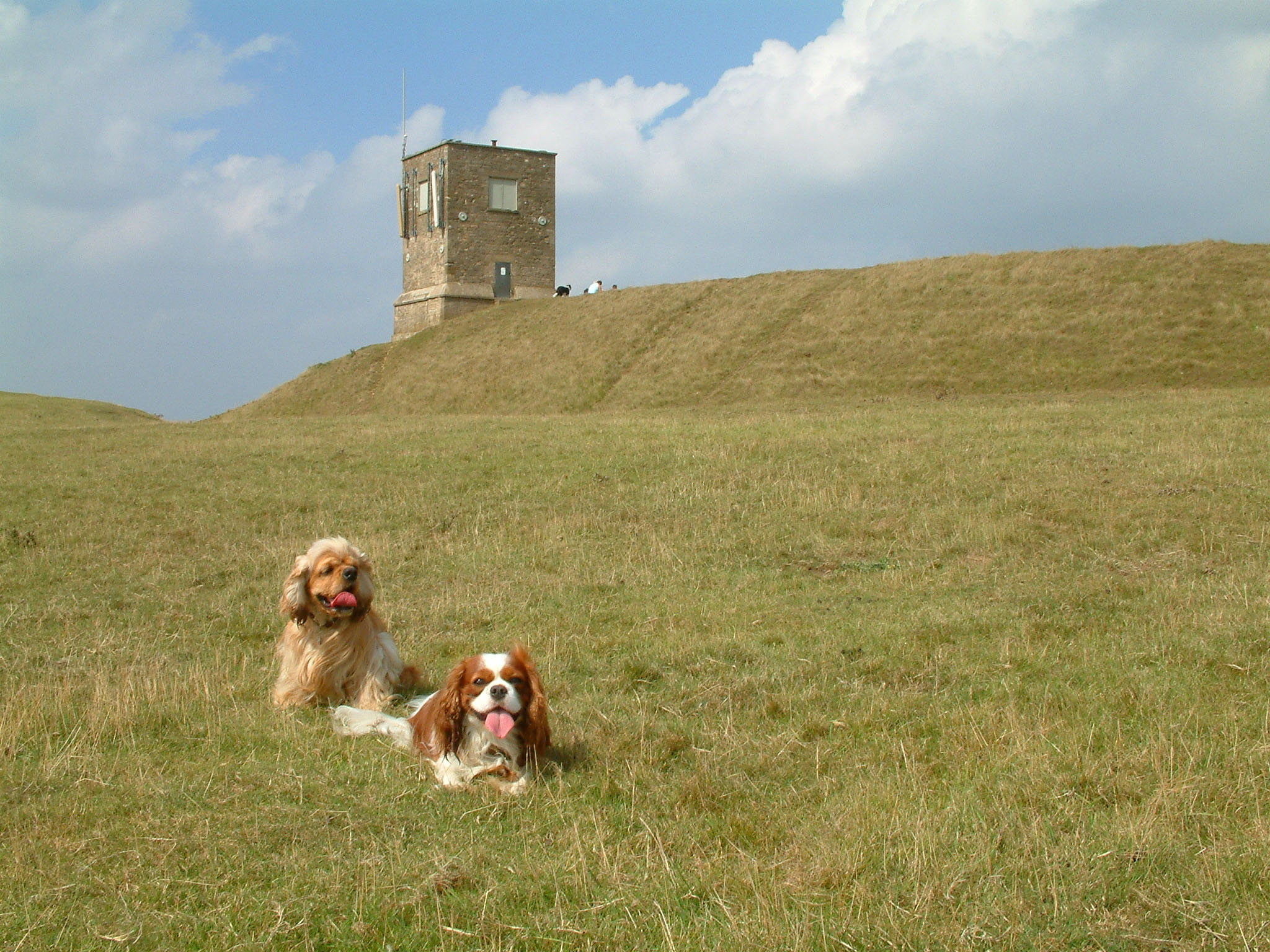
Bredon Hill

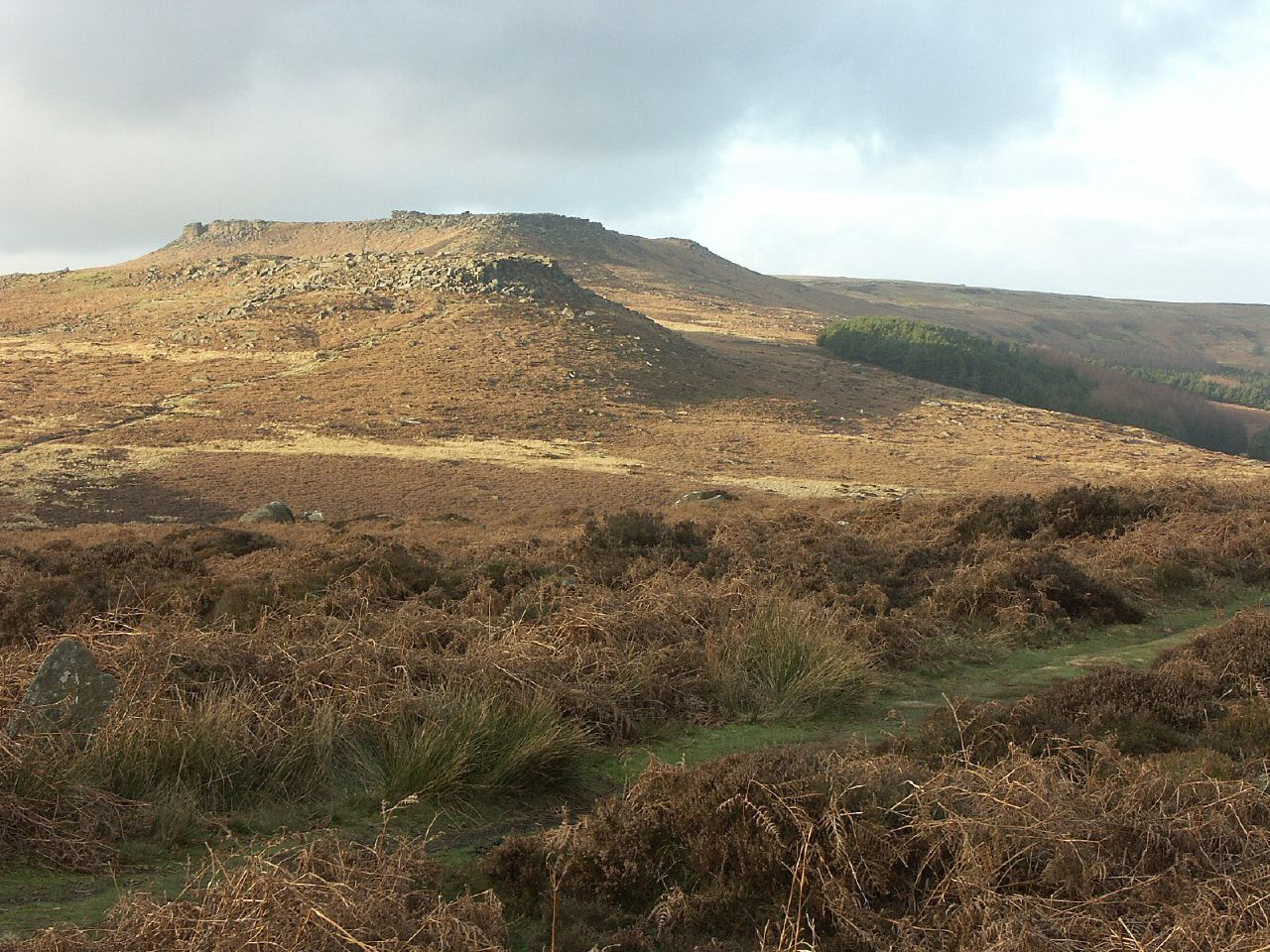
Carl Wark, Peak District

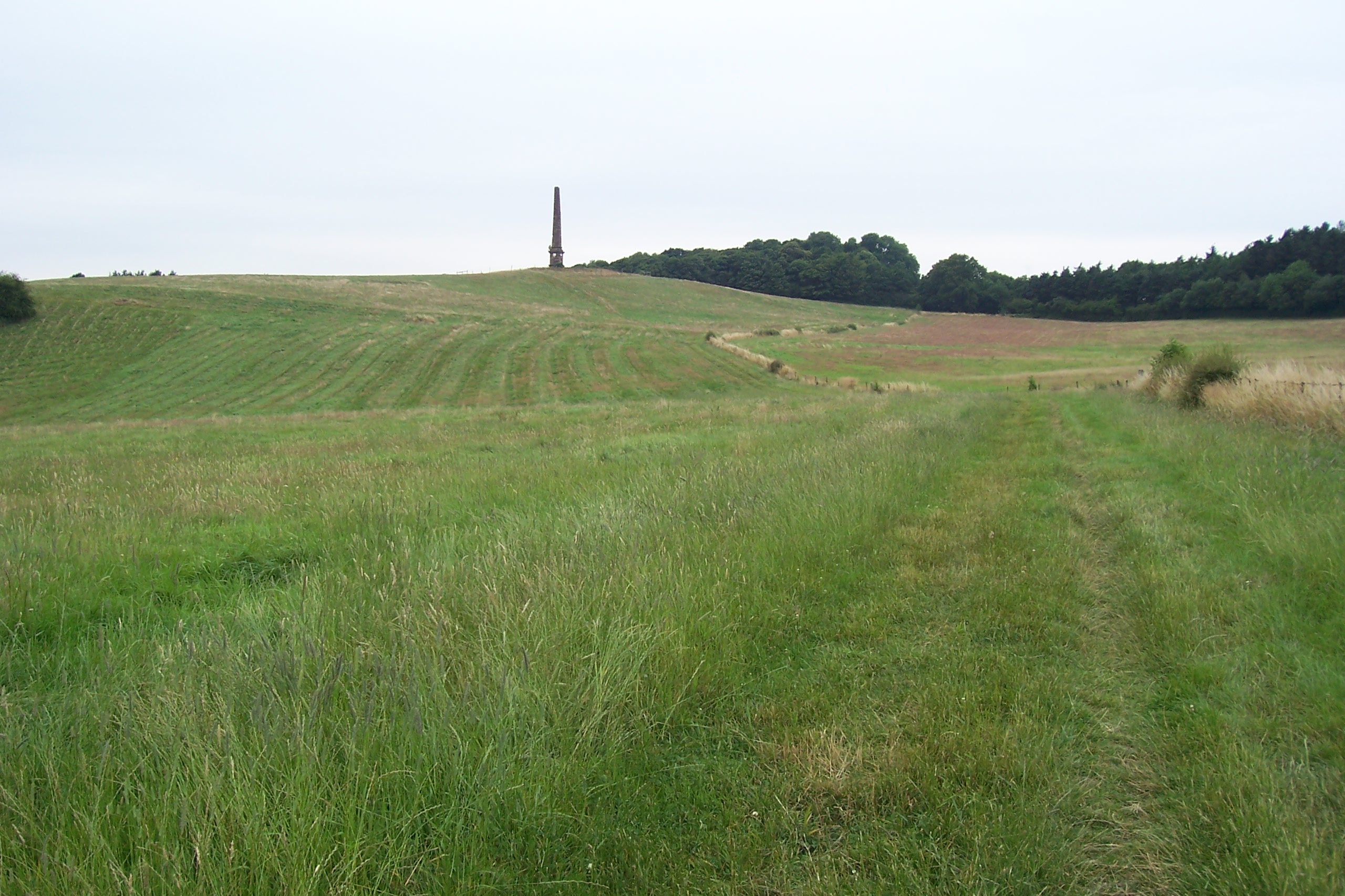
Wychbury Hill

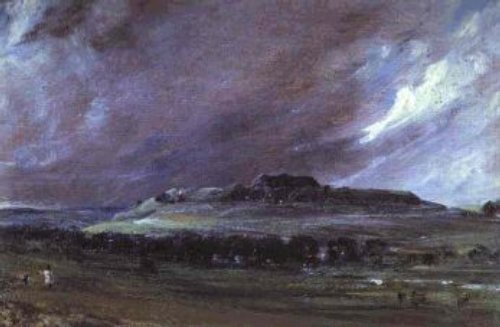
Old Sarum, by John Constable

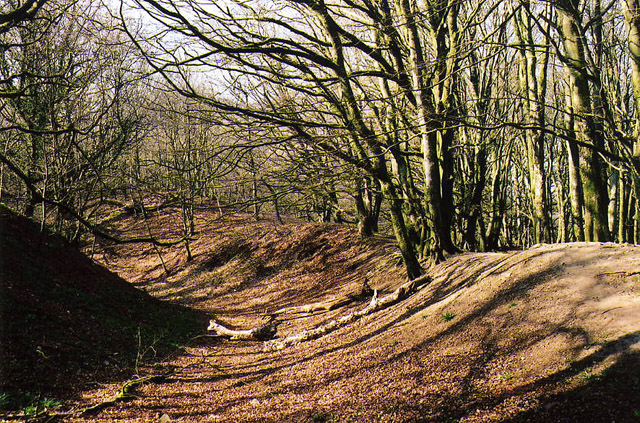
Hembury Hillfort

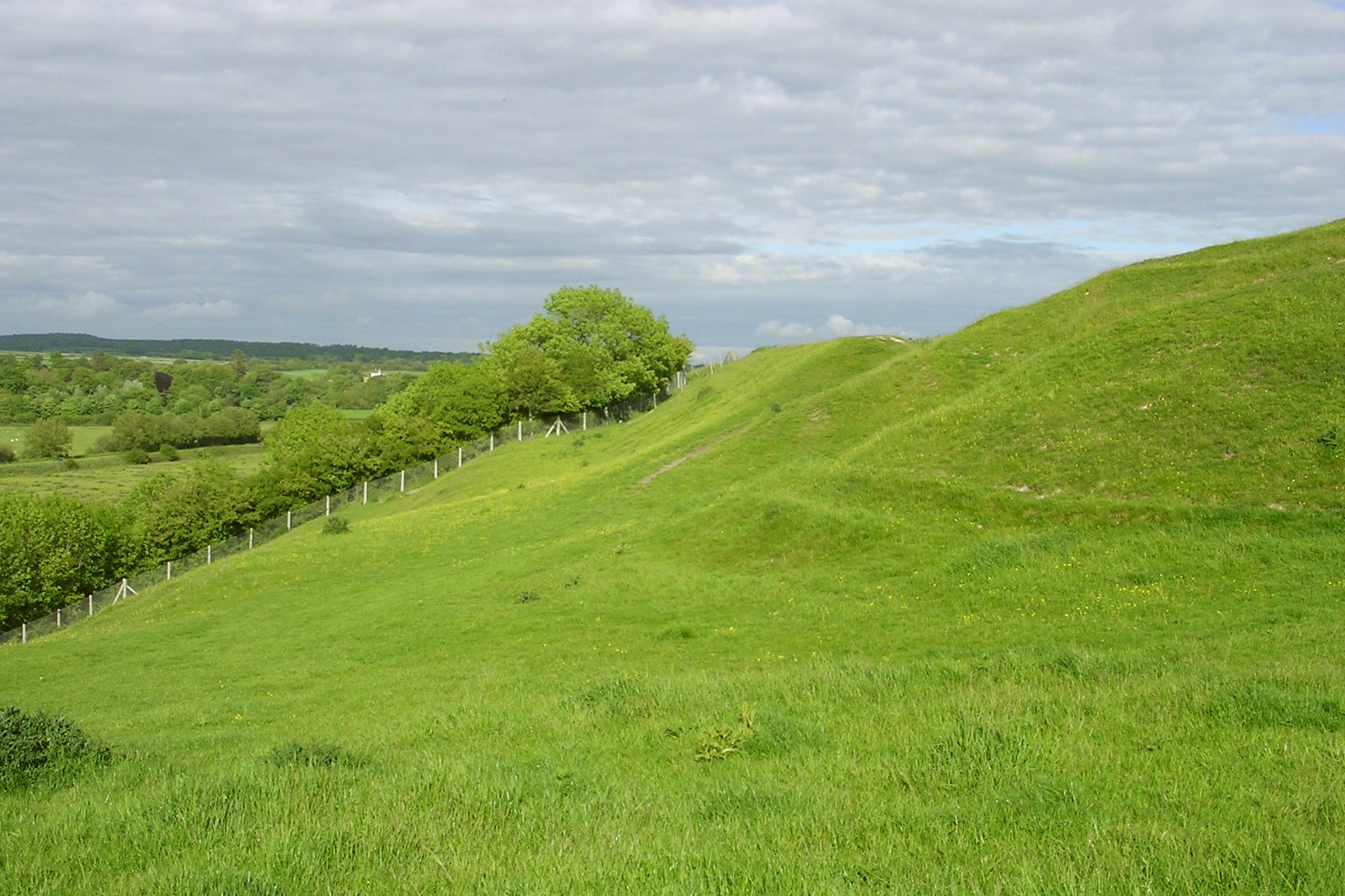
Poundbury

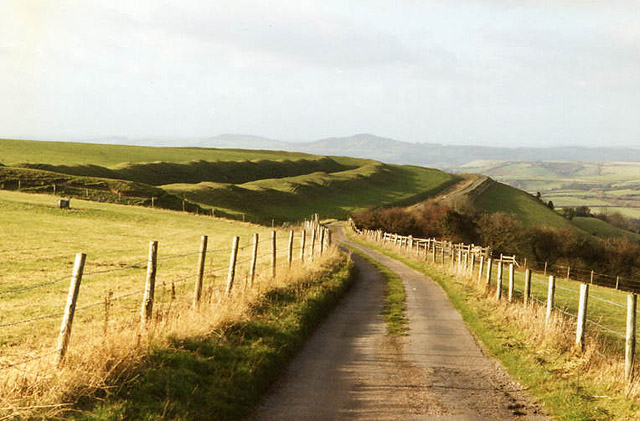
Eggardon Hill

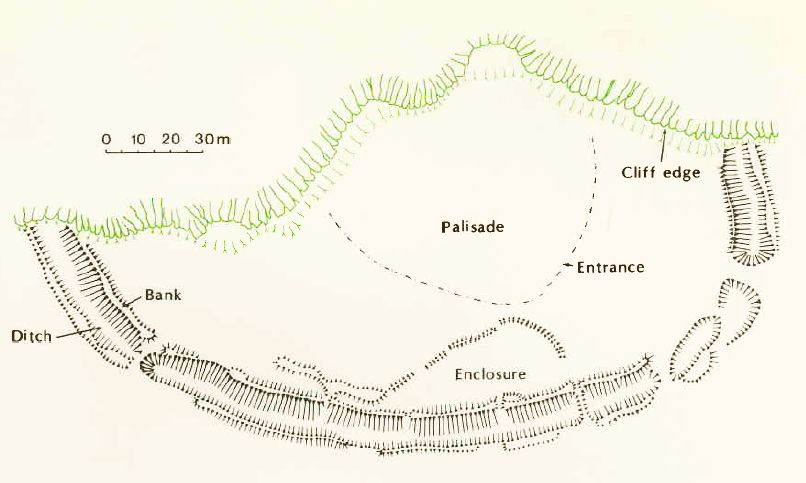
Eston Nab, North Yorkshire

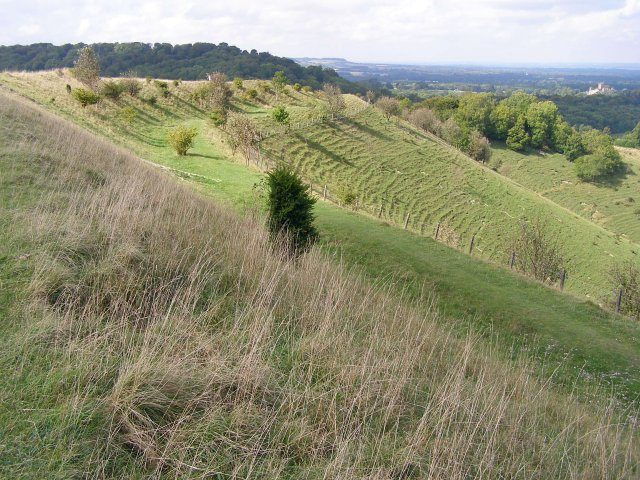
Beacon Hill, Hampshire

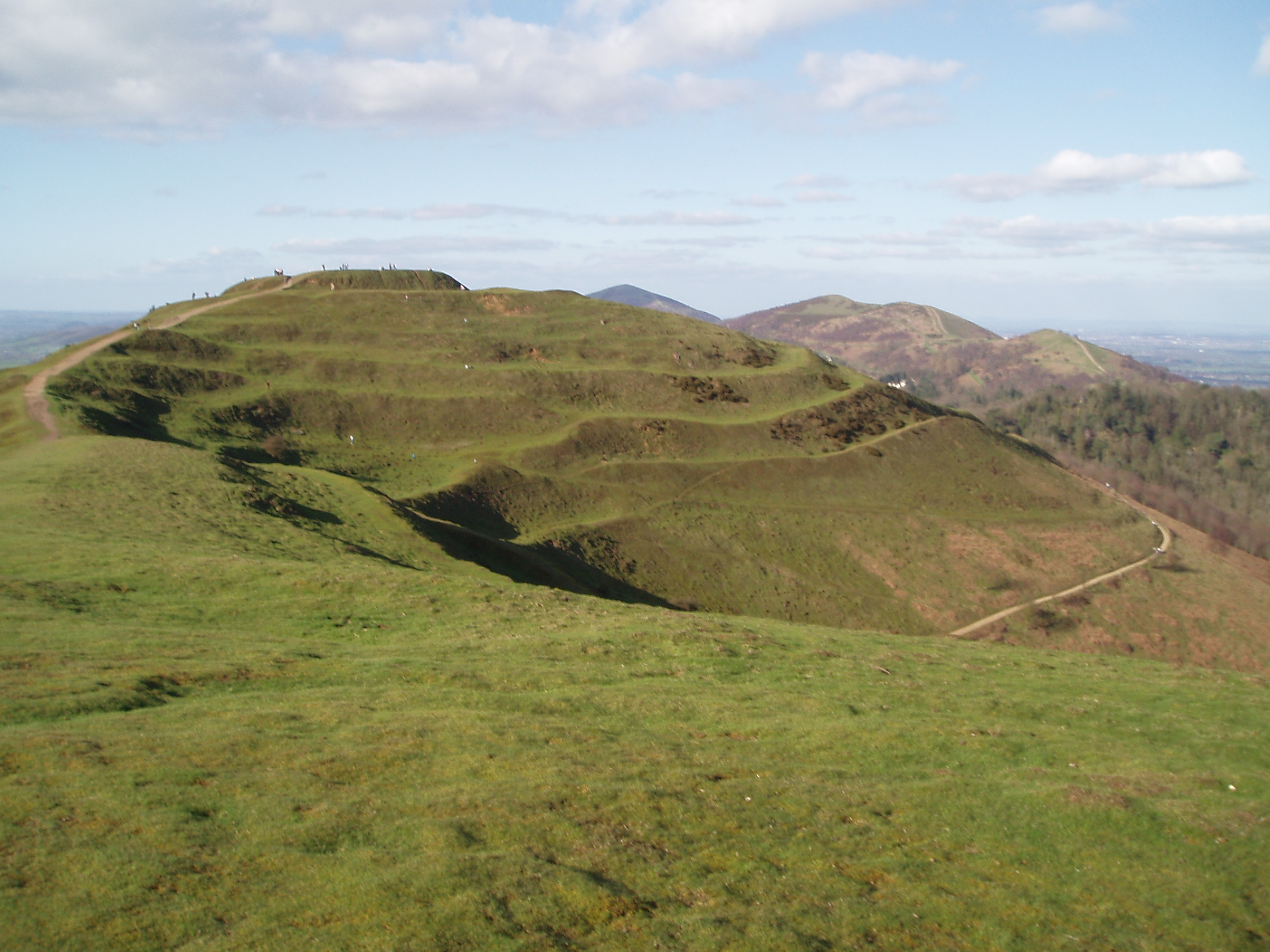
British Camp, Herefordshire

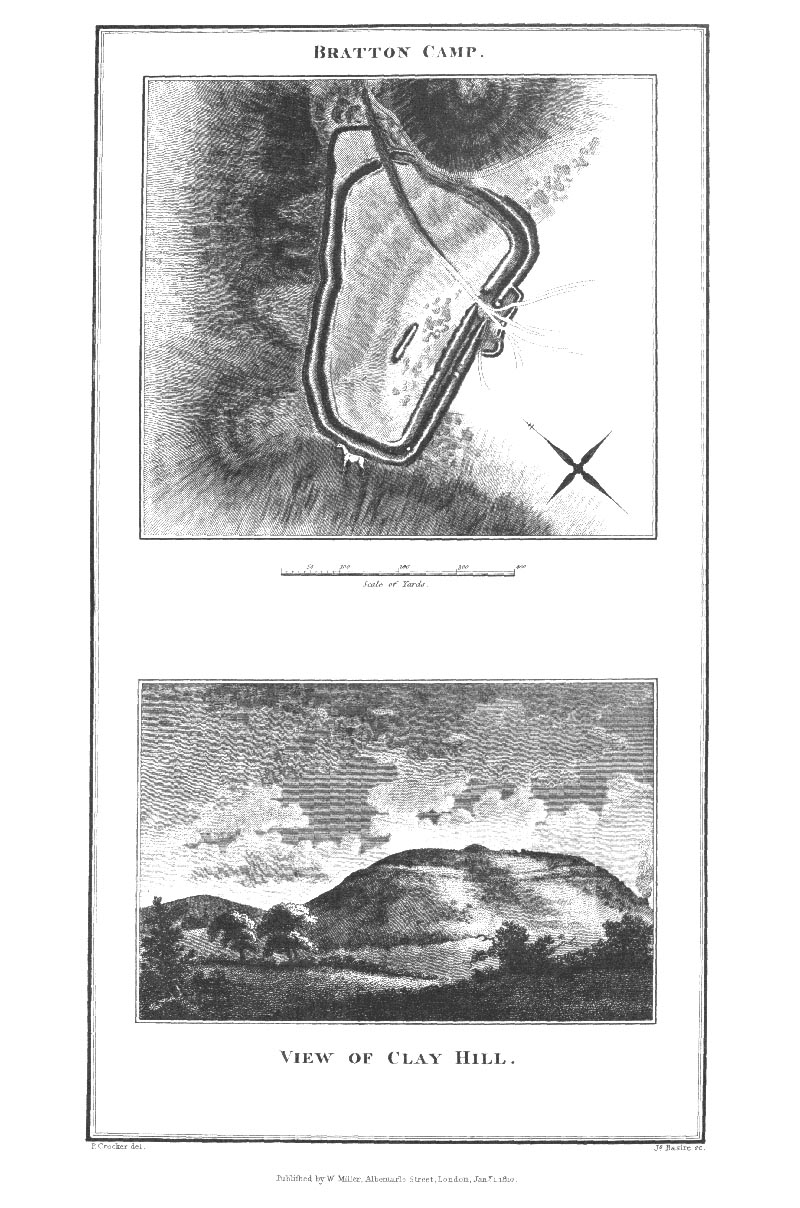
Bratton Camp and Cley Hill

== See also ==
- List of hill forts in Scotland
- List of hill forts in Wales
- Iron Age, British Iron Age, prehistory
