= Castle Head =

Castle Head may refer to:

- Castle Head, Devon, an Iron Age Hill fort
- Castle Head, Grange-over-Sands, a house near Grange-over-Sands in Cumbria, England
- Castle Head, a hill near Keswick in Cumbria
- Castle Head, a promontory, part of the Narrow Neck Plateau in New South Wales
