= Lee Woods =

Lee or Leigh Woods may refer to:

== Places ==
- Leigh Woods, Somerset
- Leigh Woods National Nature Reserve

== Others ==
- Lee Woods (artist) of Clamecy, Nièvre
- Lee Woods, (TV personality) runner up in 2014 Dance Off Soccer Am
- Lee Woods (radio personality) Classic name in the Radio industry, San Antonio, TX DJ Hall of Fame inductee.

== See also ==
- Lee Wood, Devon, location of an Iron Age settlement
