= Tidbury Ring =

Iron Age hillfort in Hampshire, England

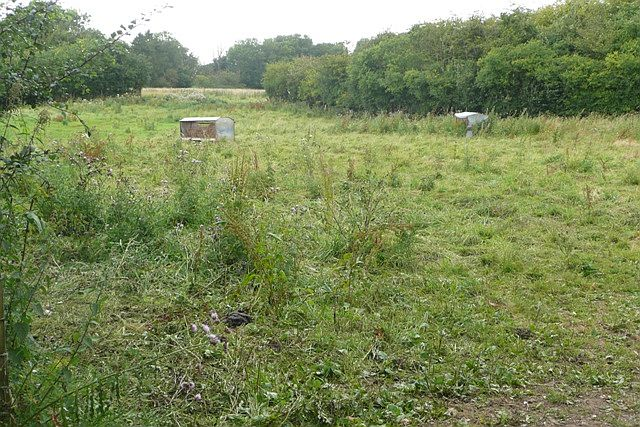
- Tidbury Ring

- Location within Hampshire
- 51.1835°N 1.3393°W
- Periods: Iron Age
- Location: Hampshire

Site notes
- Public access: on private farmland, Tidbury Farm

Tidbury Ring is the site of an Iron Age univallate hillfort located in Hampshire. The earthworks have been heavily destroyed by ploughing, but some sections to the south remain in better condition. The entrance lies to the southeast of the fort. The interior is for the most part farmland with the earthworks now covered by small trees and undergrowth Two Roman buildings, possibly a courtyard villa complex were found within the hill-fort. The site is now listed as a scheduled ancient monument no.87

== Excavations ==
In the autumn of 1927 The Rev, Canon A.B. Milner, M.A. and a schoolboy, Donald Falconer of Mitcheldever did some digging on the site. Among the “usual debris” of a Roman British building they found two brass coins of the reign of Constantine the Great. One coin, in very good condition, cast in London prior to 311 A.D.

== Location ==
The site is located at grid reference SU463429, to the north of the village of Sutton Scotney, in the county of Hampshire. The A34 dual-carriageway passes immediately to the east of the site. The hillfort of Norsebury Ring lies close by to the southeast. The hill has a summit of 114m AOD.

== See also ==
- List of places in Hampshire
- List of hill forts in England
- List of hill forts in Scotland
- List of hill forts in Wales
