= Toothill Fort =

Iron Age hillfort in Hampshire, England

- Toothill Ring, or Camp
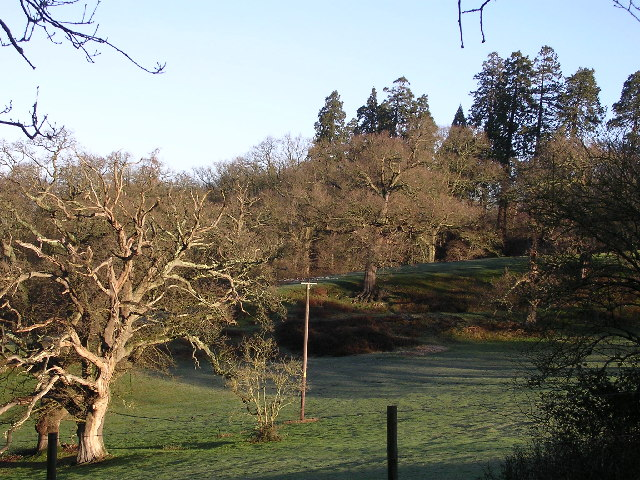
- Toothill Fort, looking north from Toothill Road, towards the rampart of Toothill iron-age camp

- Location within Hampshire
- 50.9660°N 1.4579°W
- Periods: Iron Age
- Location: Hampshire

Site notes
- Public access: on private land

Toothill Fort, or Toothill Ring, or Toothill camp, is the site of an Iron Age univallate hill fort located in Hampshire. The site occupies an extremely strong position at the north end of a spur. Its defences comprise a single rampart and ditch with traces of a counterscarp bank in places. There is an additional scarp on the north side up to 2.0m in height where the site is weakest. The original entrance is onto the ridge to the south.

The name "Toot hill" literally means lookout hill (similar to "Tout" in Dorset). The site is very heavily wooded. The redwoods planted in the middle of the hill fort make the hill even more of a landmark for many miles around.

== Location ==
The site is located at grid reference SU463429, and between the towns of Southampton and Romsey, in the county of Hampshire. The M27 motorway passes close by to the south of the site. The hill has a summit of 84m AOD.

== See also ==
- List of places in Hampshire
- List of hill forts in England
- List of hill forts in Scotland
- List of hill forts in Wales
