= Perborough Castle =

Site of an Iron Age univallate hillfort located at Compton in Berkshire

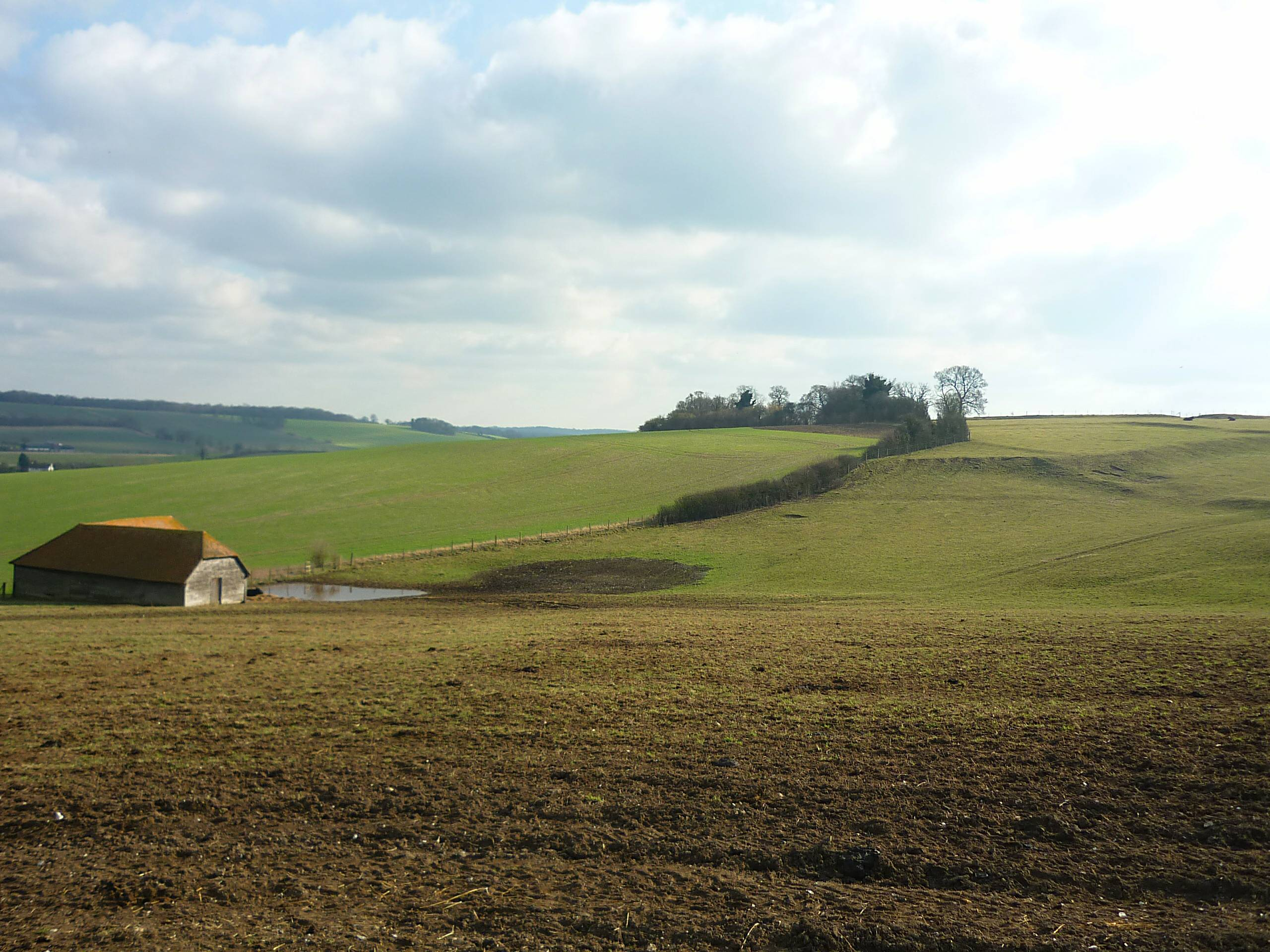
- Perborough Castle, rampart top right

- Location within Berkshire
- 51.4977°N 1.2523°W
- Periods: Iron Age
- Location: Berkshire

Site notes
- Public access: farm land

Perborough Castle is the site of an Iron Age univallate hillfort located at Compton in Berkshire. The site covers approximately 14 acres (5.7 ha), and lies on the chalky downs of West Berkshire. Archaeological evidence, from excavations in 1838, suggest that it was a lightly defended and perhaps a seasonally occupied site, containing no more than a few grain storage pits and slag pits, the extent of these being the obvious sign of continued occupation.

The Compton area had a sizeable community in the bronze-age and there are many other banks and field systems evident in the surrounding downs.

Today, the earthwork ditches and ramparts are not well defined, whether this was the original design, or more the result of deterioration over time is not clear, since the site is currently farmland and has been heavily ploughed.

== Location ==
The site is located at grid reference SU520779, on Cow Down between the villages of Compton and Hampstead Norreys in the county of Berkshire. The site lies at a level of between 135–145 m AOD. The summit of the (unnamed) hill lies a small distance away to the northwest, at 160 m AOD.

== See also ==
- List of places in Berkshire
- List of hill forts in England
- List of hill forts in Scotland
- List of hill forts in Wales
