= Sidbury Hill =

Iron Age hillfort in Wiltshire, England

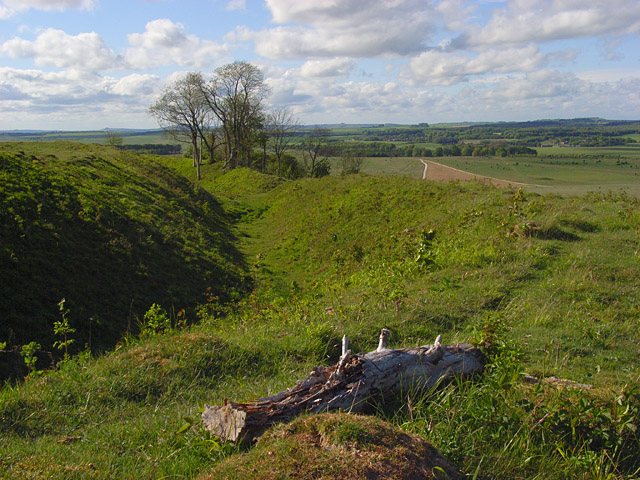
- Sidbury Hill

- Location within Wiltshire
- 51.2537°N 1.6913°W
- Periods: Iron Age
- Location: Wiltshire, England

Site notes
- Area: 17 acres (7 ha)
- Public access: not easy

Sidbury Hill, or Sidbury Camp, is the site of an Iron Age bivallate hillfort on the eastern edge of Salisbury Plain in Wiltshire, England. The site is sub-triangular in shape, approximately 17 acres (6.9 ha) in area, and is constructed on the site of a Neolithic settlement.

The hill offers excellent defensive slopes on all sides, which have been supplemented by the double ditch and rampart earthworks. The settlement and hillfort were partially excavated in the 19th century and the 1950s; there were finds of pottery and other artefacts. A Neolithic settlement site was discovered during the excavation in the 1950s, being of a section of the south-east rampart of the hillfort. A number of flint flakes and tools were recovered.

The site is a scheduled national monument. Trees planted in the 1960s were removed from 2002 and the area was allowed to revert to the natural chalk downland. Access to the site is difficult as it is on, or near, Ministry of Defence land, and there are many tank tracks and occasional artillery firing in the area. There are also numerous ditches, barrows, trackways, field systems, and tumuli in the area.

== Location ==
The site is at grid reference SU216505, to the north-west of the small town of Tidworth. The hill has a summit of 223mAOD. There are public footpaths and bridleways in the area, however the surrounding land is managed by the MOD and access to the hillfort may be restricted at times.

== See also ==
- List of hillforts in England
