= Yellowberries Copse =

Archaeological site in England

- Turtley Hillfort
- Location within Devon
- 50.411°N 3.828°W
- Periods: Late Bronze Age and/or Iron Age
- OS grid reference: SX6921258608

Site notes
- Elevation: 152 m (499 ft)
- Owner: Private

Designations
- Designation: Scheduled monument

Yellowberries Copse is an enclosure, or possibly hillfort, dating from the late Bronze Age or early Iron Age situated south of South Brent in Devon, England. It is also known as Turtley Hillfort and Roman Camp.

The site is located on the northwest slope of Cutwell Hill at about 152 metres (499 ft) above sea level. It lies to the west of where the River Avon meets the Glazebrook. While the site is prehistoric, a medieval hollow way runs close to the site. Yellowberries Copse was designated a scheduled monument in 2001, granting the site protection from unauthorised change. The site is in private ownership.

The enclosure is roughly oval-shaped, and its interior measures 100 by 90 metres (330 by 300 ft) along its major and minor axes respectively. The site is enclosed by a rampart and ditch. The rampart survives to a maximum of 1.8 metres (5 ft 11 in) high, and varies between 8 and 16 metres (26 and 52 ft) wide. The ditch survives to a maximum width of 10 metres (33 ft) and the earthwork is up to 1-metre (3 ft 3 in) deep. The site was damaged by ploughing in the modern era.

Yellowberries Copse has been on Historic England's Heritage at Risk Register since at least 2009; the register describes its condition is described as "generally satisfactory but with significant localised problems". According to the Devon Historic Environment Record, the site has not been excavated by archaeologists though based on comparison to other hillforts it is thought to date to the late Bronze Age or the Iron Age.

== See also ==
- List of hillforts in England
