= Wasteberry Camp =

Iron Age hill fort in Devon, England

Coordinates: 50.3681°N 4.0102°W

Wasteberry Camp is an Iron Age hill fort situated close to the hamlet of Blackpool, southeast of Plympton, Devon, England. The fort is situated on a hilltop in Warren Wood at approximately 90 metres (300 ft) above sea level, overlooking Silverbridge Lake.
