= Ivington Camp =

Hillfort in Herefordshire, England

Coordinates: 52.187660°N 2.754871°W

Ivington Camp is an Iron Age hill fort located at Brierley, 3 km south of Leominster, Herefordshire.

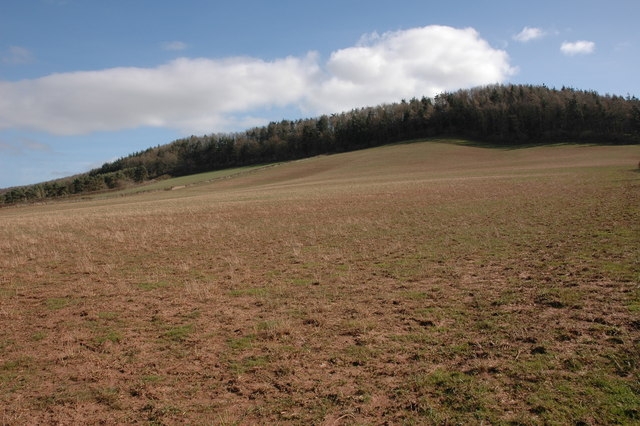
The hill fort

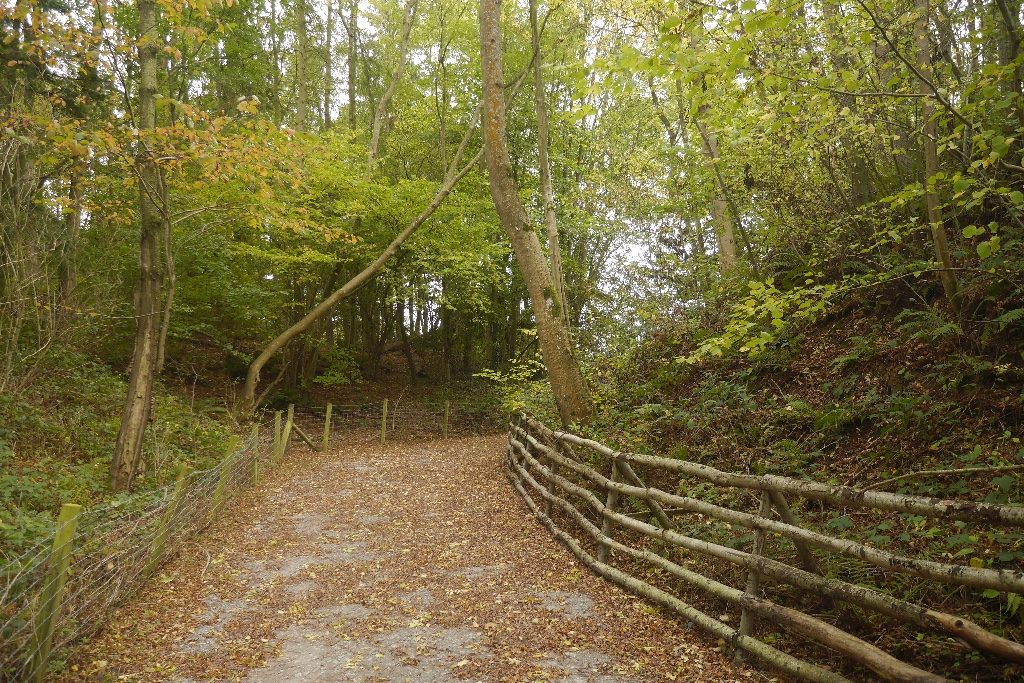
The entrance

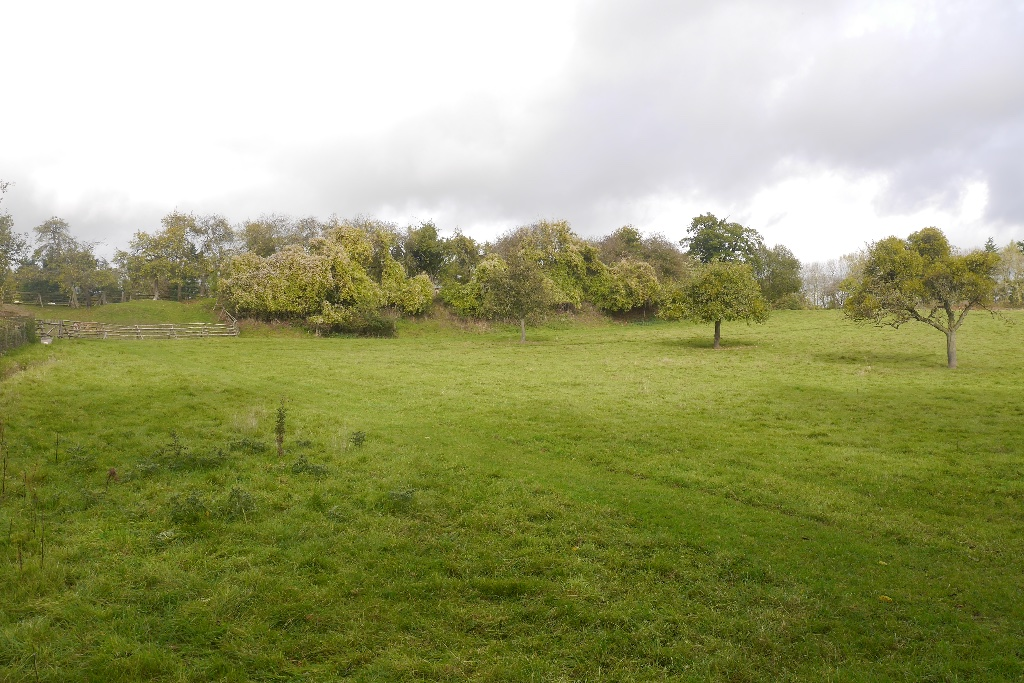
Interior of the fort

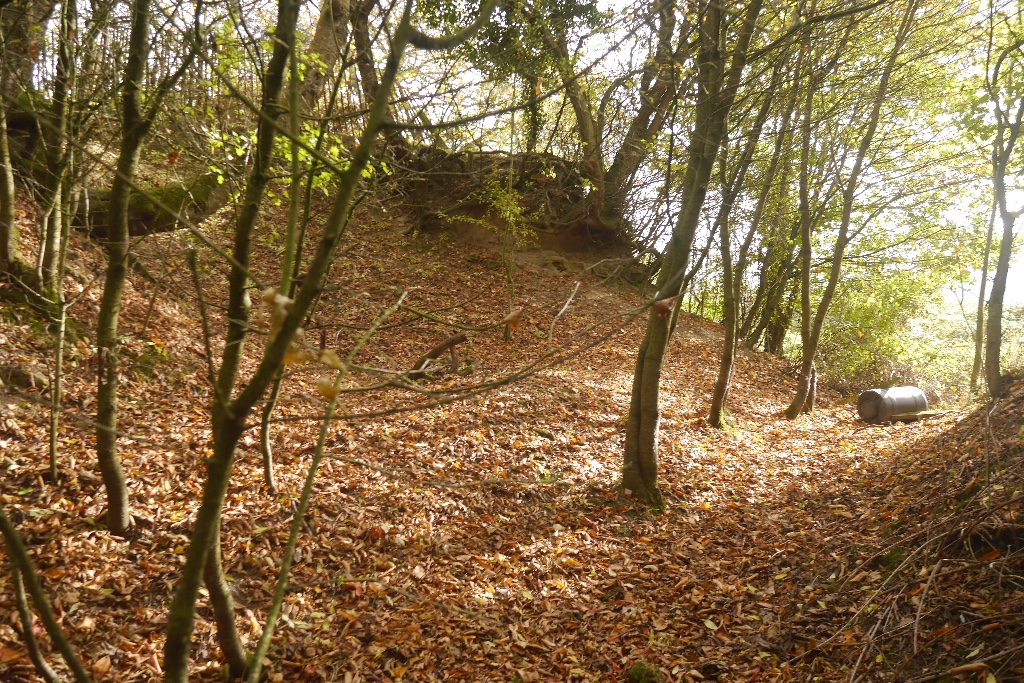
The ramparts
