= Smythapark =

Iron Age hill fort in Devon, England

Coordinates: 51.1285°N 3.9495°W

Smythapark is the site of an Iron Age hill fort, situated close to the village of Bratton Fleming in Devon, England. The site is on a hillside forming a promontory above a tributary of the River Yeo to the west of the village, at approximately 200 metres (660 ft) above sea level. The surrounding area is rich in small enclosures.
