= Castle Knowe, Northumberland =

Iron Age hillfort site in Northumberland, England

Castle Knowe
- Clinch Castle
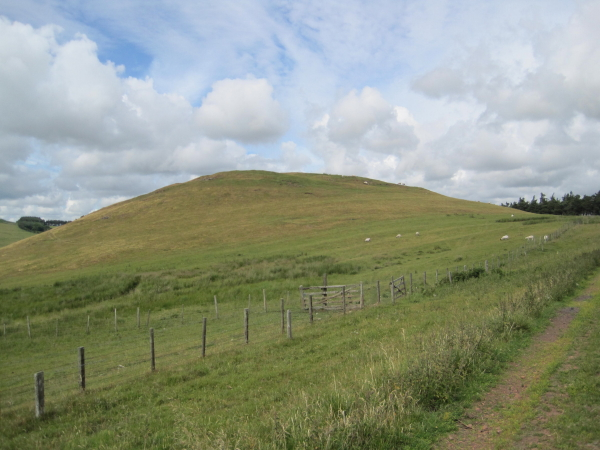
- Viewed from the south

- Location within Northumberland
- 55°25′33″N 1°57′7″W
- Type: Hillfort
- Periods: Iron Age
- Location: near Ingram, Northumberland
- OS grid reference: NU 031 147

Scheduled monument
- Designated: 6 September 1934
- Reference no.: 1016542

Castle Knowe, also known as Clinch Castle, is the site of an Iron Age hillfort in Northumberland, England, about 1 mile south-east of the village of Ingram. It is a scheduled monument.

== Description ==
The fort is in the Cheviot Hills, where there are other Iron Age sites including those at Old Fawden Hill and Chubden Hill, visible from Castle Knowe to the south-west.

The hill has steep slopes to the west and north, less steep to the east and south. The fort on the summit measures about 75 metres (246 ft) west to east and 60 metres (200 ft) north to south; there are three roughly concentric ramparts on the slopes of the hill, of which the outer rampart and middle ramparts merge on the west side. The fort's outer rampart is the most substantial. There is an original entrance on the east side, where the rampart's ends are slightly inturned.

There are remains of seven or more roundhouses within the fort, of diameter 3.8 to 8.4 metres (12 to 28 ft); there is some overlapping, indicating that there was more than one phase of occupation.
