= Padderbury Top =

Hillfort in Cornwall, England

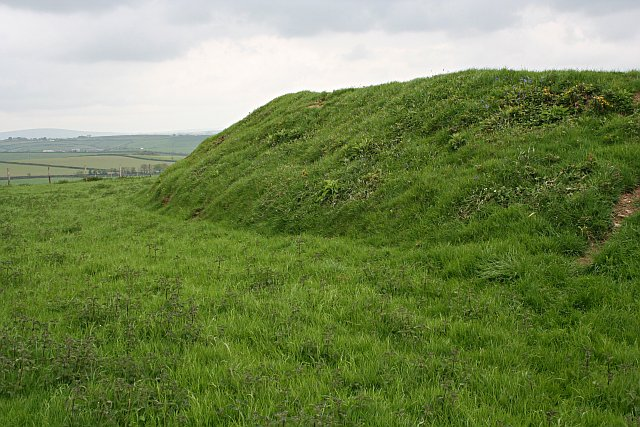

- Location within Cornwall
- 50°25′30″N 4°22′30″W
- Type: Hillfort
- Periods: Iron Age
- Location: Near Menheniot, Cornwall
- OS grid reference: SX 314 610

Site notes
- Diameter: 80 yards (73 m)

Scheduled monument
- Official name: Iron Age defended settlement at Padderbury Top
- Designated: 17 March 1977
- Reference no.: 107297

Padderbury Top is a hillfort about 2 miles (3.2 km) south-east of Menheniot, in Cornwall, England, named after the hill on which it is situated. It is a scheduled monument.

== Description ==
It is classed as a "defended settlement", being relatively small.

The enclosure is roughly circular. The diameter of the interior, which has been ploughed, is about 80 yards (73 m). There is one surviving rampart, 2–3 feet (0.61–0.91 m) above the interior, and 10 feet (3.0 m) externally. There are entrances on the west and east sides.

The rampart is surrounded by a belt of flat ground about 60 feet (18 m) wide and about 3 feet (0.91 m) high: aerial photographs show that this area was originally outer defences, since reduced by ploughing.
