= Dunwood Camp =

Iron Age hillfort in Hampshire, England

Coordinates: 51.006174°N 1.555027°W

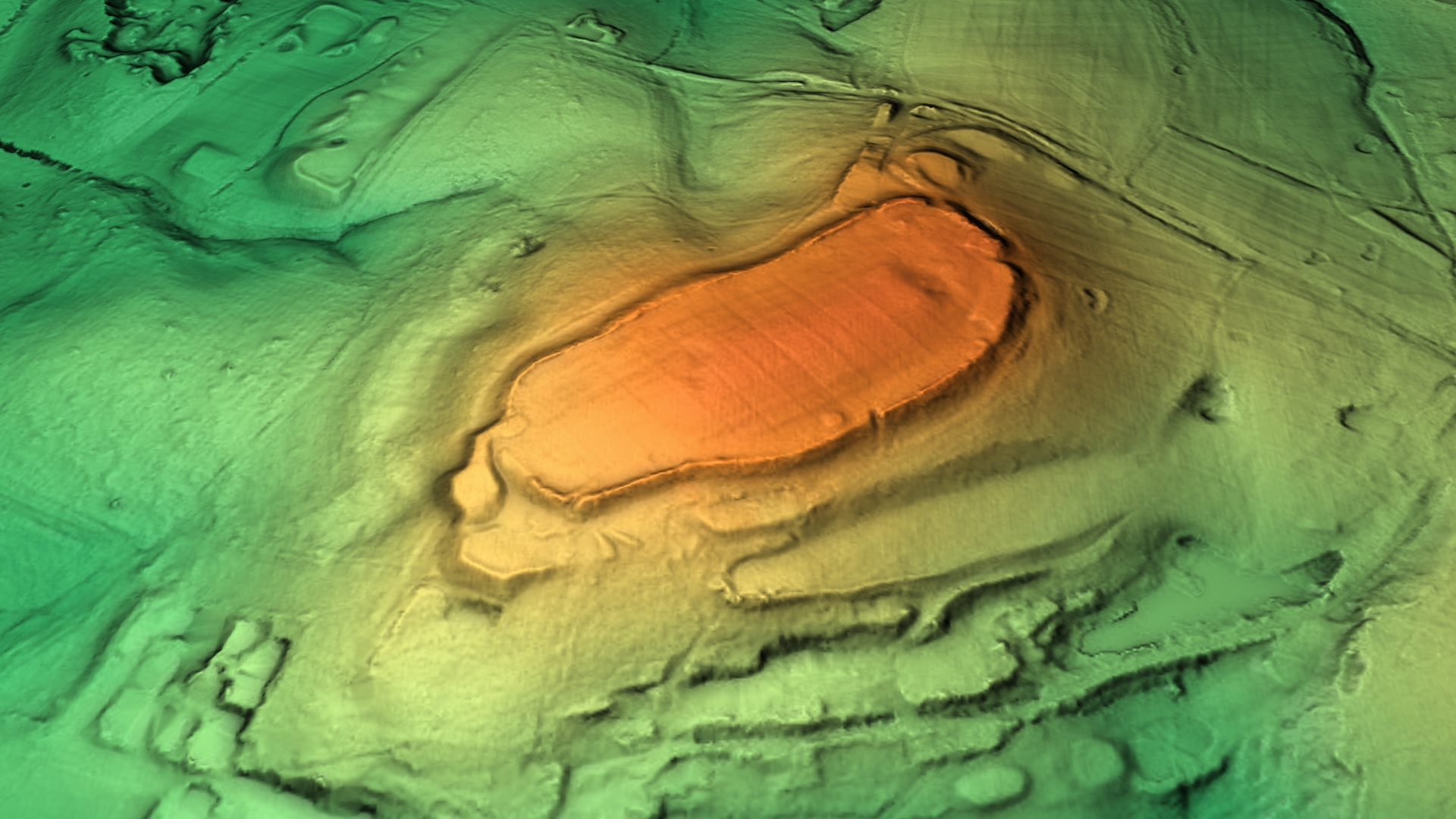
3D view of the digital terrain model

Dunwood Camp is the site of an Iron Age hillfort located in Hampshire. It occupies the summit of a sandy hill. It has a single Rampart (fortification) but no definite indication of a ditch and it is possible that this earthwork was never completed.

== Location ==
The site lies on part of the former golf course at Dunwood Manor Golf Club to the north of Dunwood Manor, and to the northeast of Romsey in Hampshire. The site lies at a summit of 93 metres (305 ft) AOD and is a scheduled monument.

- Map sources for Dunwood Camp
