= Berry Camp =

Iron Age hill fort in Devon, England

Coordinates: 50.691°N 3.139°W

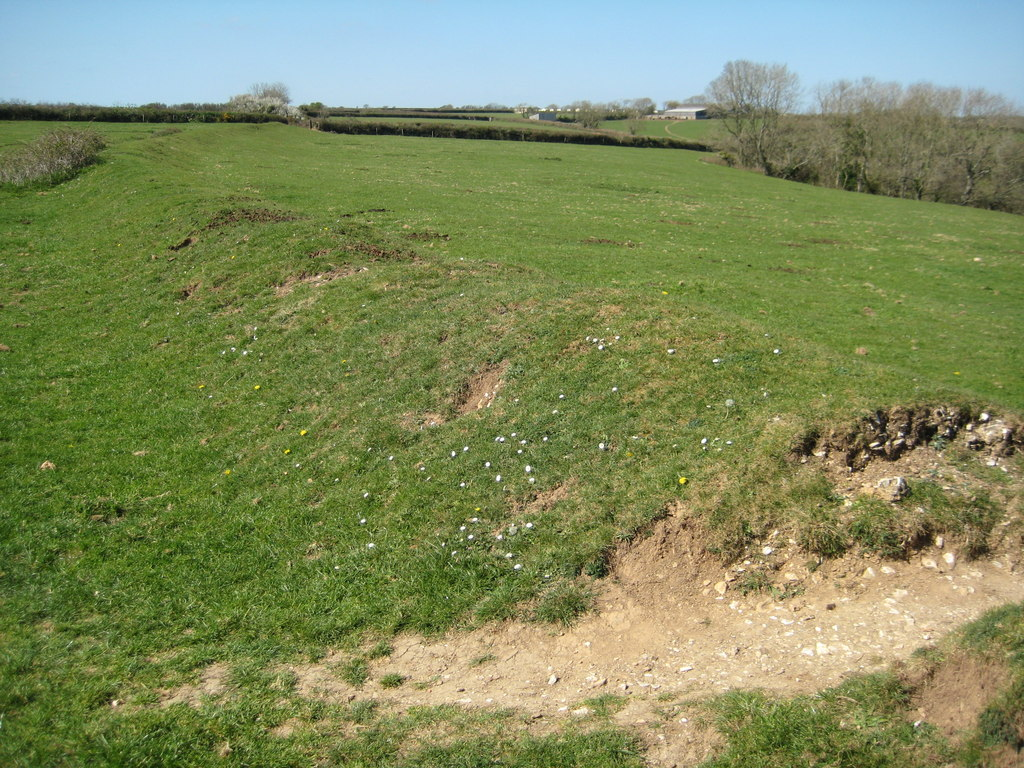
Earthworks at Berry Camp.

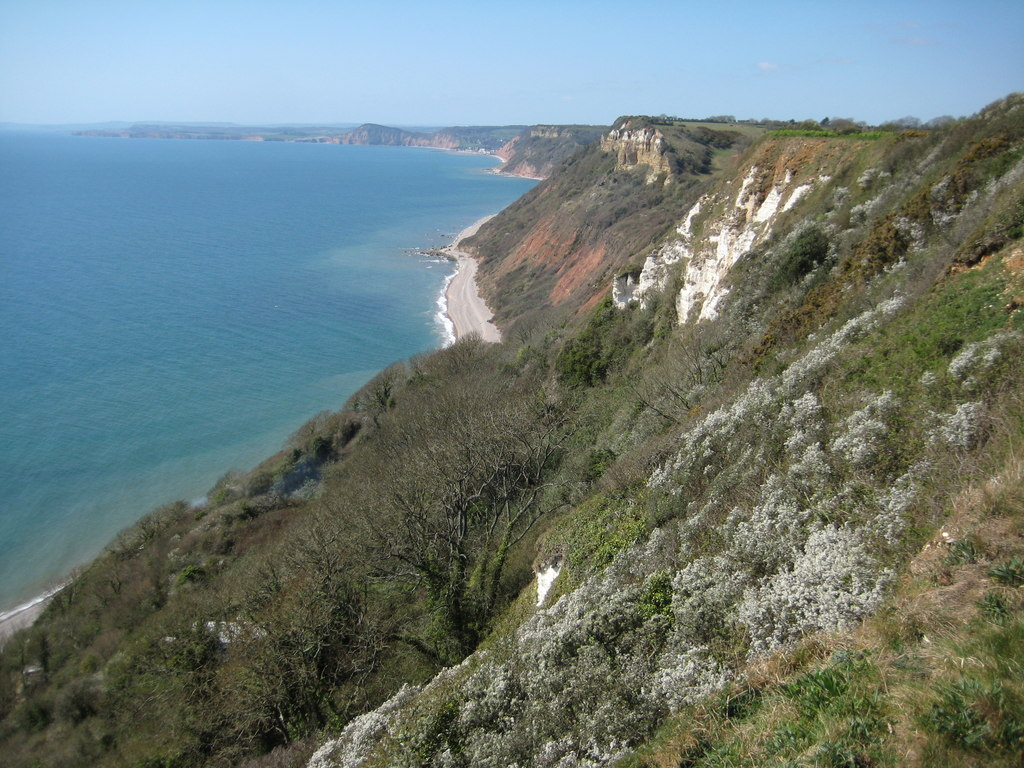
Coast viewed from Berry Camp.

Berry Camp or Berry Cliff, is an Iron Age Hill fort on a partially eroded cliff top close to Branscombe in Devon. The cliff is situated some 140 metres (460 ft) above sea level.

== Setting ==
Berry Camp is a rectangular promontory hillfort located on a plateau, close to the cliff edge at Langham Field on Littlecombe Hill at Berry Cliff, Branscombe, Devon. It is part of the Jurassic Coast World Heritage Site, which is also a Site of Special Scientific Interest.

== Description ==
The hillfort dates to the Iron Age and has an adjoining prehistoric field system. It is an univallate hillfort, or defended enclosure, and is now permanent pasture, but patches of gorse, bramble and thorn scrub obscure the defenses in several places. Three sides of the defensive bank and ditch are visible today but the ditches have been used as a dumping ground and are partly filled in. It is thought that a fourth side of the fort has been lost to coastal erosion.

The defenses are impressive, but are severely damaged. They were constructed by piling soil and flint extracted from the ditch. The interior of the fort is almost perfectly flat from ploughing in the past, leading to erosion of the inner rampart faces. In its original form, with a palisade or structured rampart and deeper ditch, it would have provided an effective enough obstacle.
