= Yarrowbury =

Iron Age hill fort in Devon, England

Coordinates: 50.310°N 3.862°W

Yarrowbury is an Iron Age hill fort situated close to Bigbury in Devon, England. The fort is situated on Hilltop to the north east of the village at approximately 80 metres (260 ft) above sea level, overlooking the Avon Estuary.
