= Largin Castle =

Hillfort in Cornwall, England

- Interactive map of Largin Castle
- 50.45188°N 4.5804°W
- OS grid reference: SX1691464521

Site notes
- Elevation: 130 metres (430 ft)
- Area: 1.8 hectares (4.4 acres)

Scheduled monument
- Official name: Largin Castle
- Designated: 04 June 2020
- Reference no.: 1461041

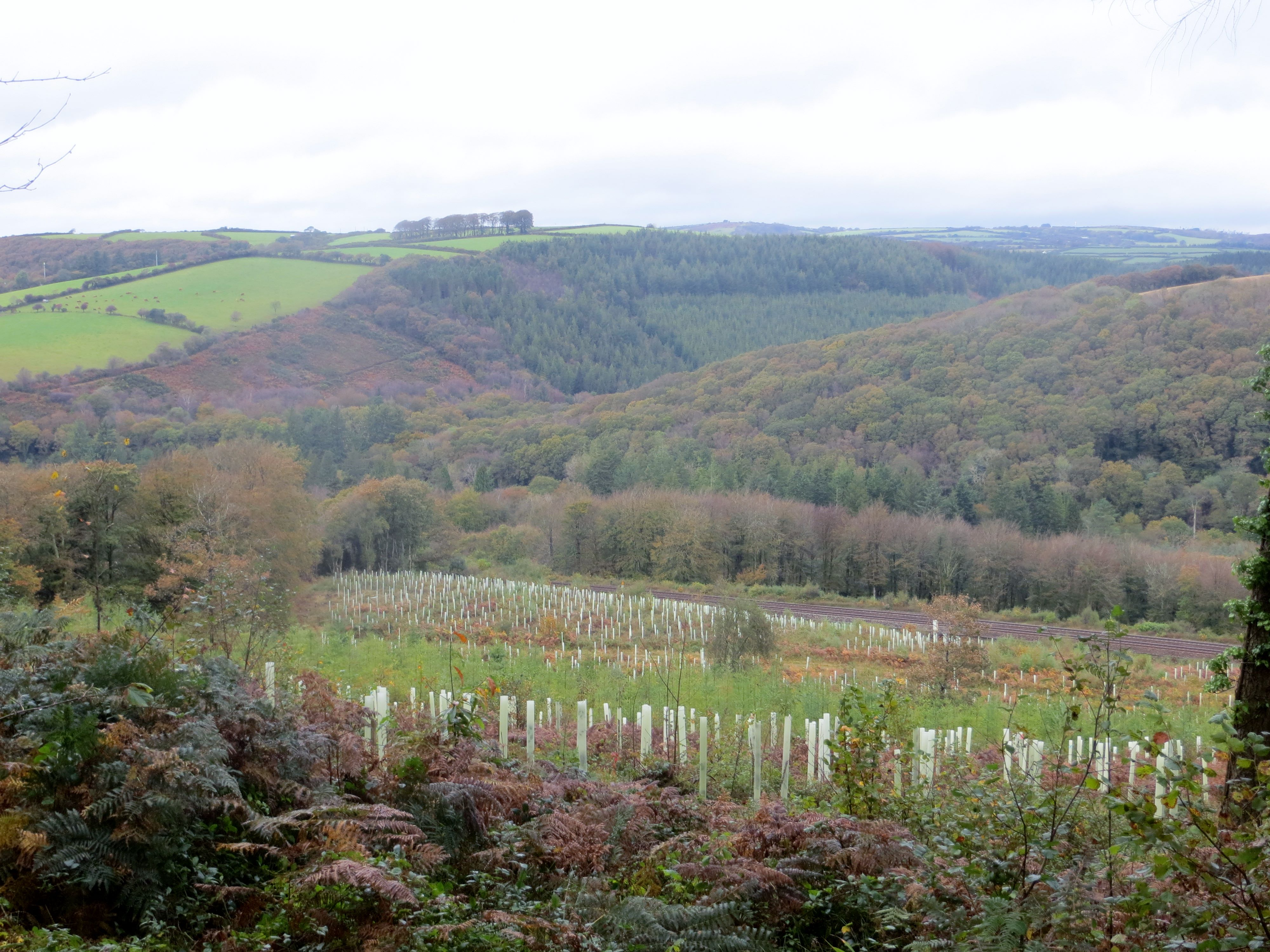
Largin Woods

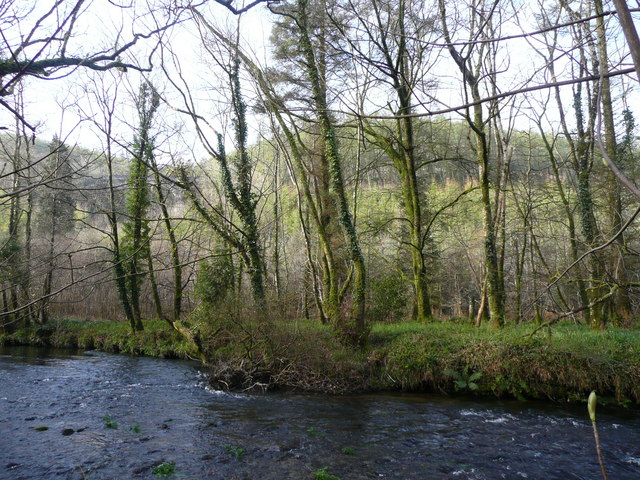
Largin Woods and the river Fowey

Largin Castle is a contour hillfort and scheduled monument in Cornwall, England, presumed to date from the Iron Age.

Largin Castle is situated approximately 4.5 kilometres (2.8 mi) west of Dobwalls, on a hill spur above the north-facing southern slope of the Fowey valley, at an elevation of 130 meters (430 ft) above sea level. It is described in the Atlas of Hillforts of Britain and Ireland as having a complex shape occupying an area of 1.8 hectares (4.4 acres). The hillfort has an outer rampart and ditch enclosure with an entrance at its south. Within this, a smaller inner oval enclosure, also defined by ramparts and ditch, is offset to the north and occupies some 3/4 of the interior. To the north and east of the hillfort, the valley drops away steeply to the Fowey and to a tributary stream, both at circa 50 meters (160 ft) elevation. To the south-west the land rises slowly to a local maximum of 193 meters (633 ft) at a distance of 690 meters (2,260 ft). A linear earthwork thought to be associated with the hillfort is found to the south-west, at the 190 meters (620 ft) contour, running for approximately 850 meters (2,790 ft) first due north, and then north-north-west.

The castle enclosure is overgrown by an ancient oak woodland; coniferous planting surrounds the site. The Atlas of Hillforts specifies the condition of the site as good.

Largin Castle was listed as a Scheduled Monument in June 2020.
