= Balksbury =

Bronze Age hillfort in Hampshire, England

Coordinates: 51.198857°N 1.500342°W

Balksbury is the site of a former Bronze Age hill fort to the southwest of Andover, Hampshire. Originally triangular in shape, most of it has been destroyed by the A303 Andover Bypass, and a large housing development. Only the very southwest parts survive, visible, and up to 1m in height. It was a large hillfort first occupied in the Late Bronze Age, with a view over the confluence of Pillhill Brook and the River Anton, below and to the southeast. This was also the direction of the single gated entrance. It was used until and during the Roman period. It is listed on the scheduled ancient monuments list - but this status clearly has not afforded it much protection.

== Location ==
The site is to the southeast of the town of Andover, within the county of Hampshire. The more prominent hillfort of Bury Hill lies to the southwest.

- Map sources for Balksbury
