= Hembury Castle, Tythecott =

Iron Age hill fort in Devon, England

Coordinates: 50.9375°N 4.2470°W

Hembury Castle is an Iron Age Hill fort situated close to Tythecott, south of Buckland Brewer in Devon, England. The fort is situated on a promontory off the east of a large hill at some 137 metres (449 ft) above sea level.
