= Bullsdown Camp =

Site of a former Iron Age plateau fort in the County of Hampshire

Coordinates: 51.320662°N 1.03868°W

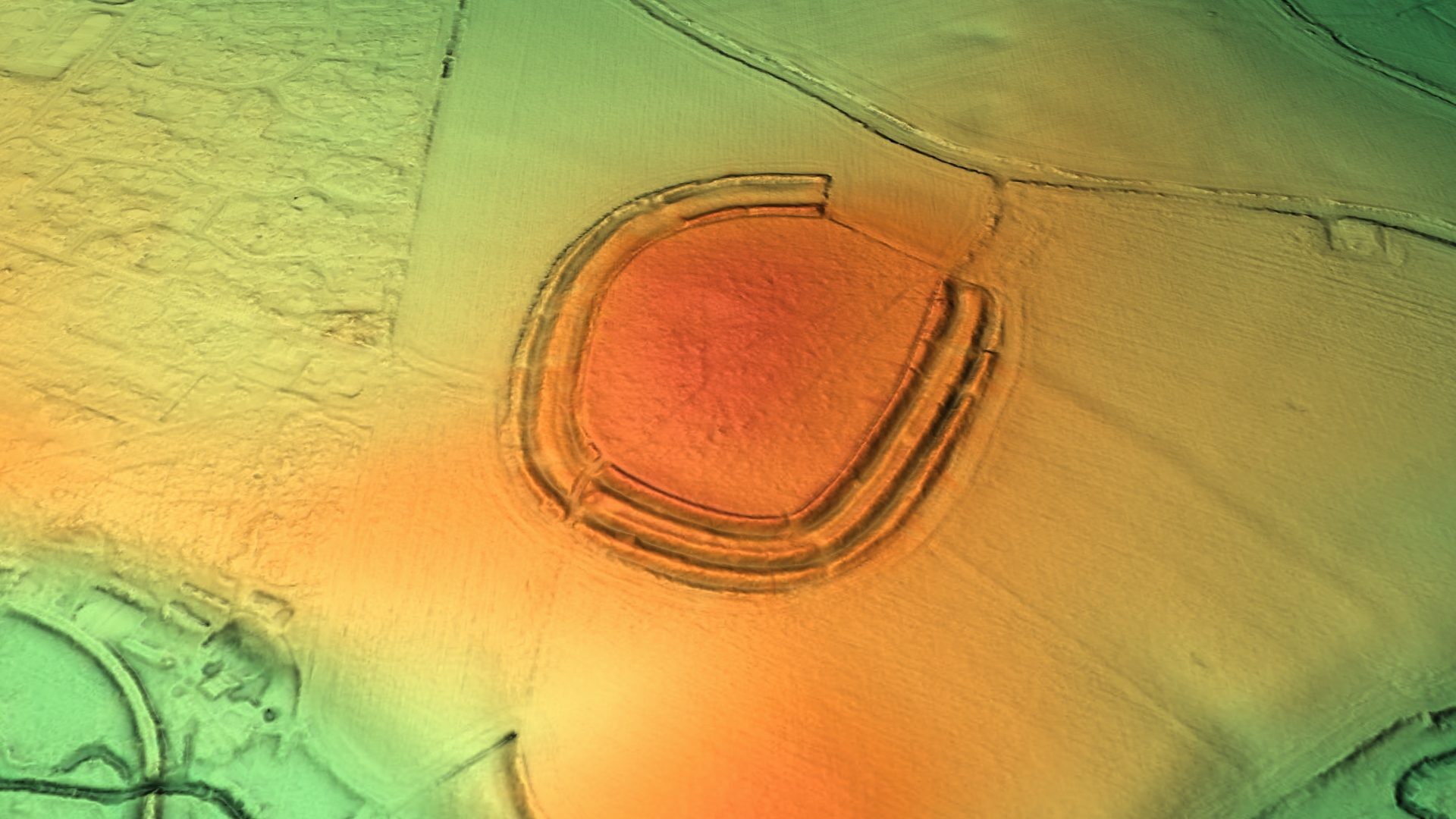
3D view of the digital terrain model

Bullsdown Camp is the site of a former Iron Age plateau fort in the county of Hampshire. The site is heavily wooded, and close inspection is required to observe the three bank and ditch fortifications. Although eroded heavily the earthworks are still impressive

== Location ==
The site lies to between the villages of Bramley Green and Sherfield on Loddon, in Hampshire. The River Loddon lies close by to the East. The site lies on a very shallow plateau at a height of 65m AOD.

- Map sources for Bullsdown Camp
