= Mowsbury Hill =

Hillfort and nature reserve in Bedford, England

Coordinates: 52.167221°N 0.442078°W

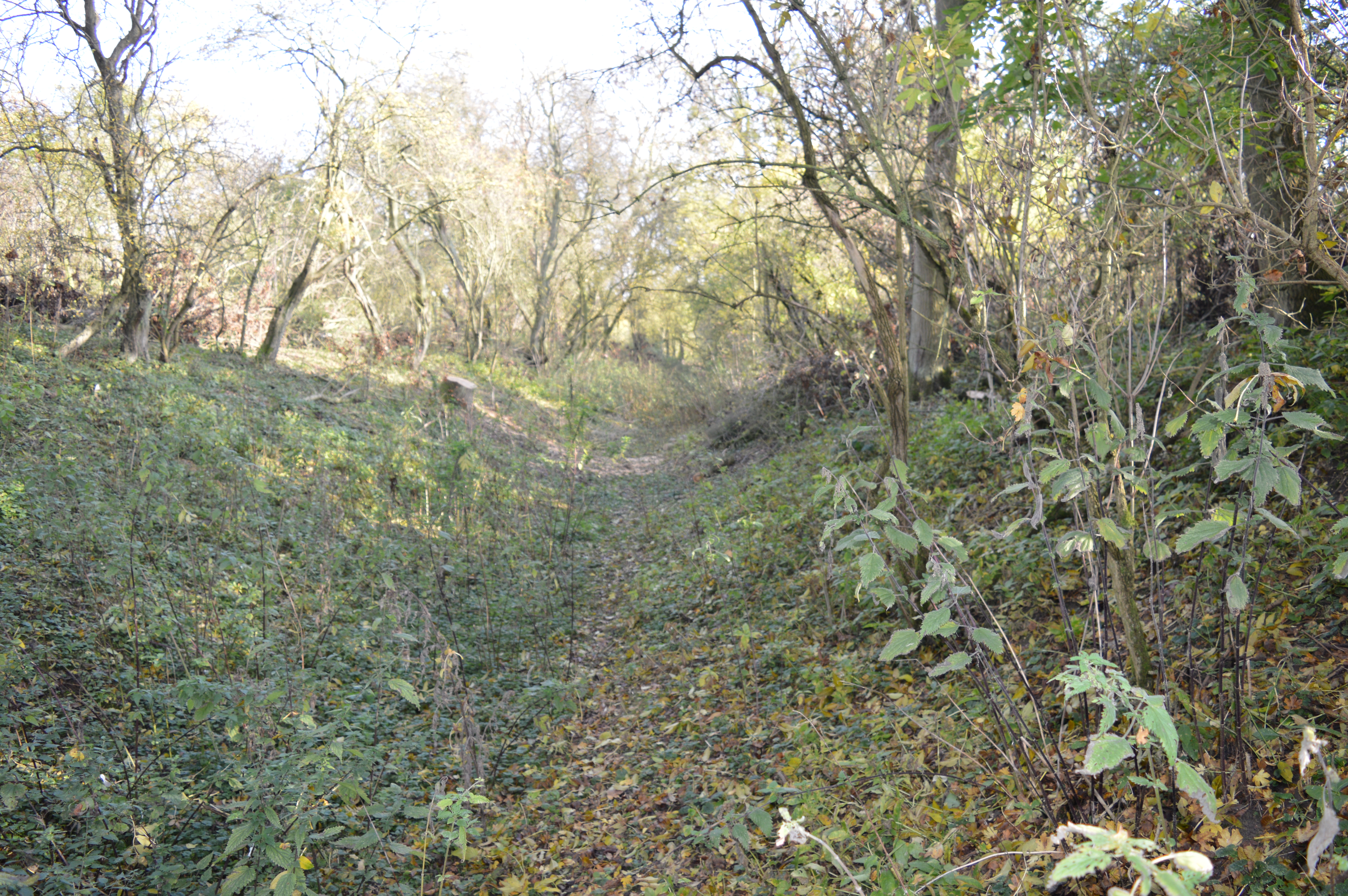

Mowsbury Hill is a 2.8 hectare Local Nature Reserve and Scheduled Monument in north Bedford. It is owned and managed by Bedford Borough Council with the assistance of the Friends of Putnoe Wood and Mowsbury Hillfort.

Archaeological excavation has shown that the site is a univallate (having a single rampart) hillfort, and pottery dates to the early Iron Age, occupied for a limited period. In medieval times it was a moated settlement with two fishponds in the Manor of Morinsbury. The site is also an old orchard with a wildflower meadow, woodland, scrub, a moat and ponds.

There is access from the Mowsbury Golf Course car park on Cleat Hill.
