= Lesingey Round =

Ringfort in Penzance, Cornwall, England

- Ker Lysyngi (Cornish)
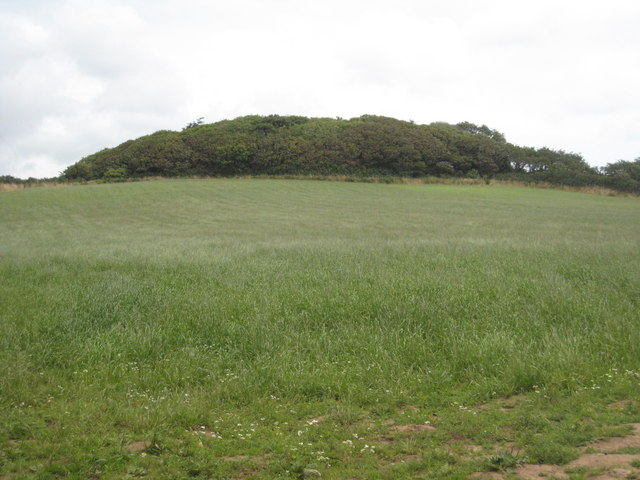
- Viewed from the west

- Location within Cornwall
- 50°7′7″N 5°33′50″W
- Type: Hillfort
- Periods: Iron Age
- Location: Near Penzance, Cornwall
- OS grid reference: SW 453 303

Site notes
- Area: 1.5 acres (0.6 ha)

Scheduled monument
- Official name: Round called Lesingey Round
- Designated: 22 July 1958
- Reference no.: 1004400

Lesingey Round (Cornish: Ker Lysyngi) is a ringfort, a smaller type of hillfort, about 1 mile (1.6 km) west of Penzance, in Cornwall, England. It is a scheduled monument.

A 'round', the name for a ringfort in Cornwall where they are common, is a small circular embanked enclosure, with one entrance; they date from the late Iron Age to the early post-Roman period.

== Description ==
Lesingey Round is situated at the summit of a hill. The area of the site is wooded. The circular bank is 12–15 feet (3.7–4.6 m) above the partly buried external ditch and about 6 feet (1.8 m) above the interior; it encloses an area of about 1.5 acres (0.6 ha). As the inner slope of the rampart is absent in places, the location of the entrance is not known. There are no visible traces of occupation inside.

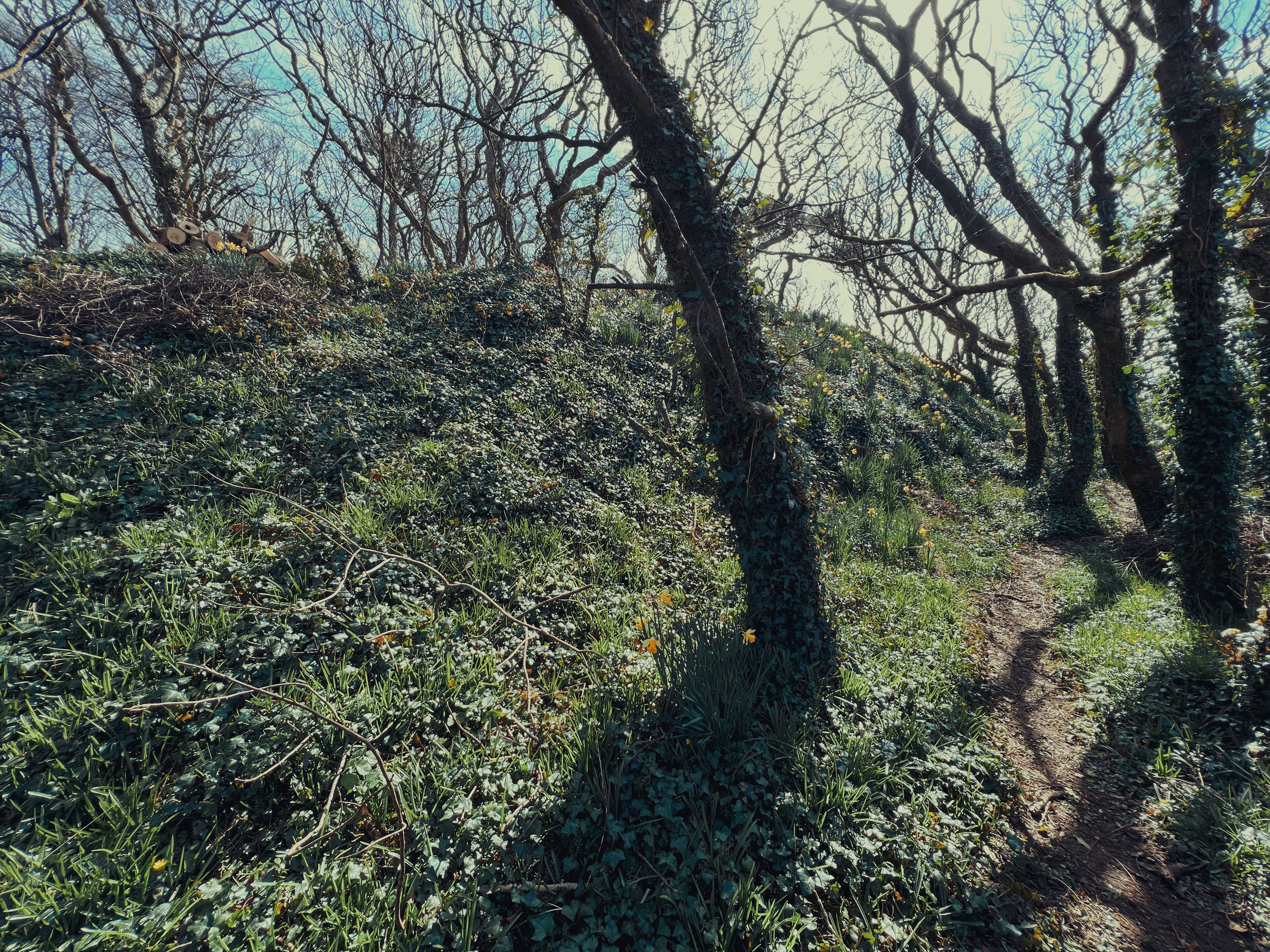
The south-western ramparts at Lesingey Round

In 1584 the topographer John Norden referred to an ancient ruined castle on a mound near Penzance, calling it Castle Horneck; he may have been describing this site, which suggests that the site was occupied in the medieval period. The existing Castle Horneck is about 400 metres (440 yd) away.

Cornish 'Horn' and 'Hornek' are 'Iron' in English, so 'Castle Horneck' would have some kind of translation as 'Iron Castle'.

Lesingey Round is colloquially known as 'Bluebell Dell' and, although it is probably not technically a 'Dell' (in fact it is surprisingly elevated, and quite a step up so easily understood to be a fort) it is always full with bluebells each spring.
