= Woodbury, Stoke Fleming =

Iron Age hill fort in Devon, England

Coordinates: 50.3478°N 3.6283°W

Woodbury is an Iron Age hillfort situated in the parish of Stoke Fleming, close to Dartmouth in Devon, England. The fort is situated on a promontory on the southern side of Norton Down at approximately 145 metres (476 ft) above sea level.
