= Chilworth Ring =

Iron Age hillfort in Hampshire, England

Coordinates: 50.951006°N 1.412671°W

Chilworth Ring is the site of a small univallate Iron Age hillfort (a scheduled ancient monument) located in Hampshire. Partial excavations of the site were carried out in 1928. The site has now been developed into circle of detached houses lying within the ramparts, constructed sometime in the 1960s. The original bank can only be seen in the eastern quadrant where it is followed by the road. The nearby Castle Hill earthwork to the west is thought to have been a cattle enclosure. The road serving the houses is called The Ring.

== Location ==
The site lies in the village of Chilworth, just inside the South-Eastern boundary of the Test Valley, in the county of Hampshire, bordering onto the city of Southampton. The site lies at a summit of 75 metres (245 ft) AOD.
