= Halwell Camp =

Iron Age hill fort in Devon, England

Coordinates: 50.3664°N 3.7108°W

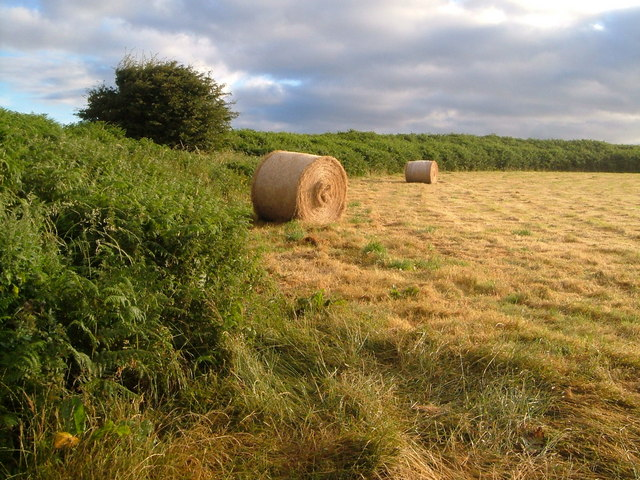
Halwell Camp

Map showing the location of Halwell Camp within Devon
(grid reference SX783533)

Halwell Camp is an Iron Age hill fort situated close to the village of Halwell in Devon, England. The fort is situated on a pass between two hilltops to the east of the village at approx 185 metres (607 ft) above sea level.
