= Berry Ring =

Iron Age hillfort in Staffordshire, England

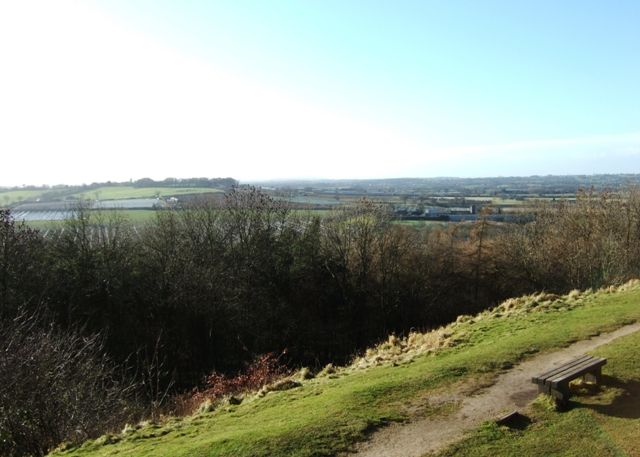
- A distant view of Berry Ring (left of picture), seen from Stafford Castle

- Location within Staffordshire
- 52.7879°N 2.1685°W
- Type: Hillfort
- Periods: Iron Age
- Location: near Stafford, Staffordshire
- OS grid reference: SJ 887 212

Site notes
- Area: 3 hectares (7.4 acres)

Scheduled monument
- Designated: 17 March 1926
- Reference no.: 1013163

Berry Ring (also known as Bury Ring) is an Iron Age hillfort in Staffordshire, England, lying some two miles southwest of the county town of Stafford, a mile to the southwest of Stafford Castle and half a mile to the west of the M6 motorway.

== Description ==
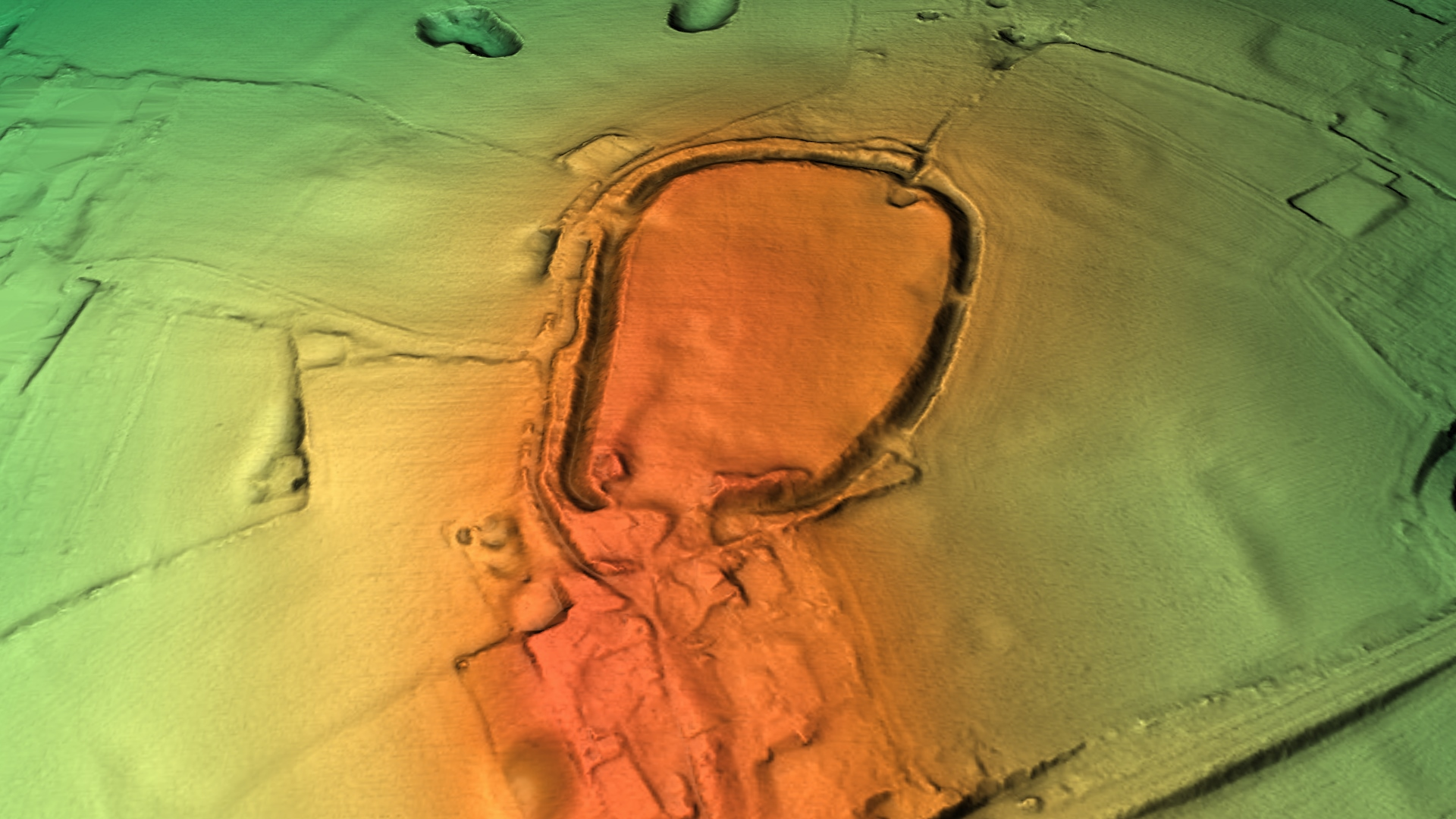
3D view of the digital terrain model

It is a univallate hillfort, roughly oval in shape, on the northern part of elevated land north of the village of Billington. The defences, following the contours of the ground, enclose an area of about 3 hectares (7.4 acres).

The rampart is about 1.5 metres (4 ft 11 in) high in the south-east, elsewhere about 0.2 metres (7.9 in) high. The outer ditch is up to 18 metres (59 ft) wide and 4 to 4.7 metres (13 to 15 ft) deep. A counterscarp bank can be seen in the north, west and south, most clearly in the north-west where it is 1 metre (3 ft 3 in) high and 14 metres (46 ft) wide. The original entrance is thought to be in the south; its features are unclear because of sand and gravel extraction in recent times. There are other later entrances.

There is a spring-fed pond within the fort at the north-east side. There have been chance finds around the interior of flints, Iron Age pottery and medieval pottery.
