= Borough Hill, Sawston =

British archaeological site

Coordinates: 52.1240°N 0.1483°E

Borough Hill is a large multivallate hillfort near Sawston, Cambridgeshire, England.

== Description ==
Borough Hill is an oval-shaped area measuring 430 metres (1,410 ft) east to west and 300 metres (980 ft) north to south.
