= Burley Wood =

Iron Age hill fort site in Devon, England

Coordinates: 50.6692°N 4.1318°W

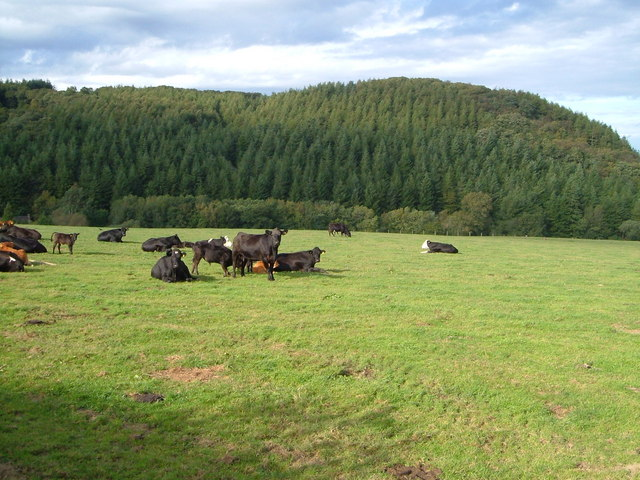
Burley Wood

Burley Wood is the site of an Iron Age hill fort north of Lydford in Devon, England. The fort occupies much of a hilltop some 220 metres above sea level overlooking the river Lew. The site also has a Norman motte-and-bailey earthwork just below it to the northeast at approx 215 metres above sea level.
