= Belbury Castle =

Archaeological site in England

Coordinates: 50.7386°N 3.3111°W

Belbury Castle is the name given to an Iron Age earthwork, probably a hill fort or livestock enclosure, close to Ottery St Mary in Devon, England. The earthwork is on part of a hilltop at approximately 115 metres (377 ft) above sea level.

The ancient site was known as 'bigulfesburh' or Beowulf's burgh.
