= Stockland Castle =

Name of two Iron Age hill forts on Stockland Hill, Devon, England

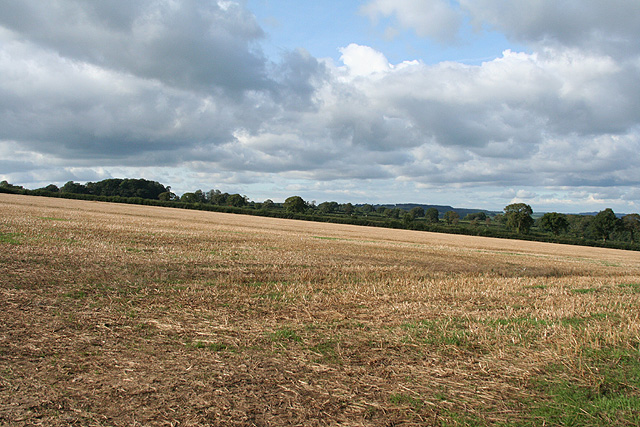
Site of Stockland Great Castle

Stockland Castle is the name given to two Iron Age hill forts on Stockland Hill close to Stockland, Devon, England. Stockland Great Castle (50.8178°N 3.0999°W) occupies a position on the eastern slope of the hill at 190–210 metres (620–690 ft) above sea level. Stockland Little Castle (50.8269°N 3.0948°W), located about 1 kilometre (0.6 mi) northeast of its larger neighbour, occupies a small promontory on the eastern slope of the hill at approximately 175 metres (574 ft) above sea level.
