= Lee Wood =

Archaeological site in England

Coordinates: 51.1198°N 4.1647°W

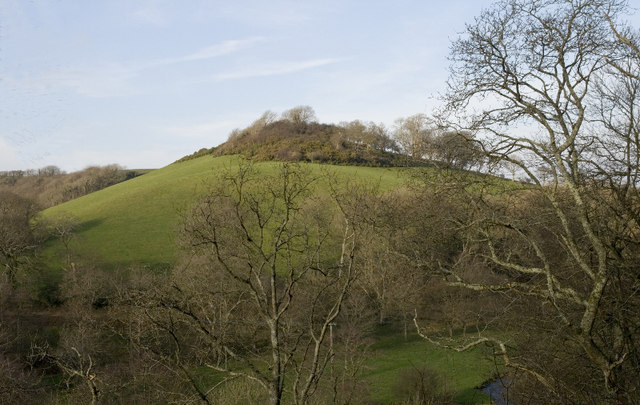
Castle Hill

Lee Wood is the location of an Iron Age enclosure or hill fort situated near to Braunton and Barnstaple in Devon, England. The enclosure is situated on a sloping hillside forming a promontory above the Knowle Water at approx 120 metres (390 ft) above sea level to the northeast of Braunton and northwest of Barnstaple.

== Discovery ==
The Lee Wood enclosure was discovered in the late-1950s by the local farmer whose family owned the property on which the fort is located for 100 years until it was sold in 2016.

The woods that once covered this earthwork were cut down in the 1960s and during this work a fireplace was partially uncovered (the remaining portion extended under the fort's earthen bank). The exposed portion of the fireplace contained ashes and small pieces of animal bone, including pig, dating from the Neolithic period.

== Description ==
The fort is about 70 paces in diameter, and is located on the western spur of a hill overlooking to the west the valley of Knowle Water. The remains of a track leading to the fort can still be seen. Many Mesolithic and Neolithic flint scrapers, serrated blades, backed blades, burins, knives, and arrowheads (all identified & verified by Exeter University) as well as slingshots and other stones showing signs of having been used as tools have been found near the fort.

The "hill-slope fort" is now clearly visible in an open field. It is shown on Ordnance Survey maps at SS537374. It is located on private property and is not accessible to the public. The enclosure has not yet been excavated.
