= Castle Head, Devon =

Iron Age hill fort in Devon, England

Coordinates: 50.584°N 4.287°W

Castle Head is a British Iron Age Hill fort occupying a commanding position on a promontory at the neck of a bow in the River Tamar on the Devon side close to Dunterton. The fort is situated approximately 100 metres above sea level, there is another earthwork due south lower on the promontory at approx 50 metres (160 ft) above sea level, and others on the Cornwall side of the river.
