= Norsebury Ring =

Iron Age hillfort in Hampshire, England

- Naesan Byrg
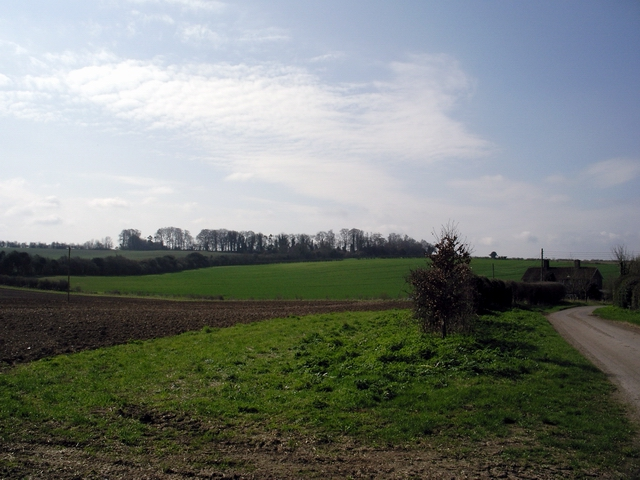
- Looking south from Hunton Down lane: Behind the trees on the horizon lies Norsebury Ring

- Location within Hampshire
- 51.1579°N 1.2992°W
- Periods: Iron Age
- Location: Hampshire

Site notes
- Area: just under 10 acres
- Public access: on private farmland

Norsebury Ring is the site of an Iron Age univallate hillfort located in Hampshire. Now mostly ploughed out to the South and east, some ditches and ramparts remain within a small copsed area to the North and west, which are surprisingly intact with a small outer ditch, then a bank, then another larger ditch followed by larger bank. However the trees and undergrowth hide the earthworks from immediate view.

A magnetometry survey in 1997 revealed two entrances (at the southeast and southwest) and found evidence to suggest that the site had a thriving Iron Age settlement. Bronze Age and Roman pottery has also been found at the site. Originally, from one of the two entrances, a ditched avenue led to a large sub-circular enclosure some 30M. across in the centre of the fort. The enclosure may have contained a timber shrine as is thought to have existed at Danebury.

The name Norsebury has apparently nothing to do with the "Norsemen", but the site was called originally "Naesan Byrg" which translates as "Fort at the ness", this later became "nose", and later still, "norse".

The site is a scheduled ancient monument, No.131.

Just to the East at grid reference SU497391 lies the site of the 'Weston Colley Group' of 13 round barrows. The 'Hampshire Treasures' resource says they have been extensively ploughed out and are now crop marks only.

== Location ==
The site is located at grid reference SU491401, and lies to the east of the village of Sutton Scotney, and to the west of the village of Micheldever, in the county of Hampshire. Immediately to the south lies the River Dever. The site lies just off to the western side of a shallow hill, at a level of approximately 100m AOD.
