= Scheduled monuments in Devon =

Protected historic sites in Devon, England

This is a list of scheduled monuments in Devon.

== Devon ==
- Ash Hole Cavern
- Boringdon Camp
- Brixham Battery
- Castle Close
- Clovelly Dykes
- Cranmore Castle
- Huntsham Castle
- Kents Cavern
- Malmsmead Bridge
- Meldon Viaduct
- Salcombe Castle

== Plymouth ==
- Royal Citadel
- Mount Batten Mound
- Mount Batten prehistoric settlement
- Crownhill Fort
- Stamford Fort

== Exeter ==
Scheduled monuments and listed buildings in Exeter.

- Exeter Cathedral Green
- Exeter city wall
- St Nicholas Priory
- Medieval Exe Bridge
- The remains of St Catherines Chapel (Catherine Street)
- Rougemont Castle
- The settlement of Danes Castle
- The remains of The Hall of the Vicar's Choral (South Street)
- The Underground Passages
