= Walter Skinner (disambiguation) =

Walter Skinner was a fictional character.

Walter Skinner may also refer to:

- Walter Skinner (MP), English politician, MP for Newport (Cornwall)
- Walter Skinner (cricketer) (1913–1994), English cricketer
- Walter Jay Skinner (1927–2005), United States federal judge
- Walter R. Skinner (1851–1924), London-based publisher
