= Castle Close =

Hillfort in Devon, England

Coordinates: 50.9527°N 3.5144°W

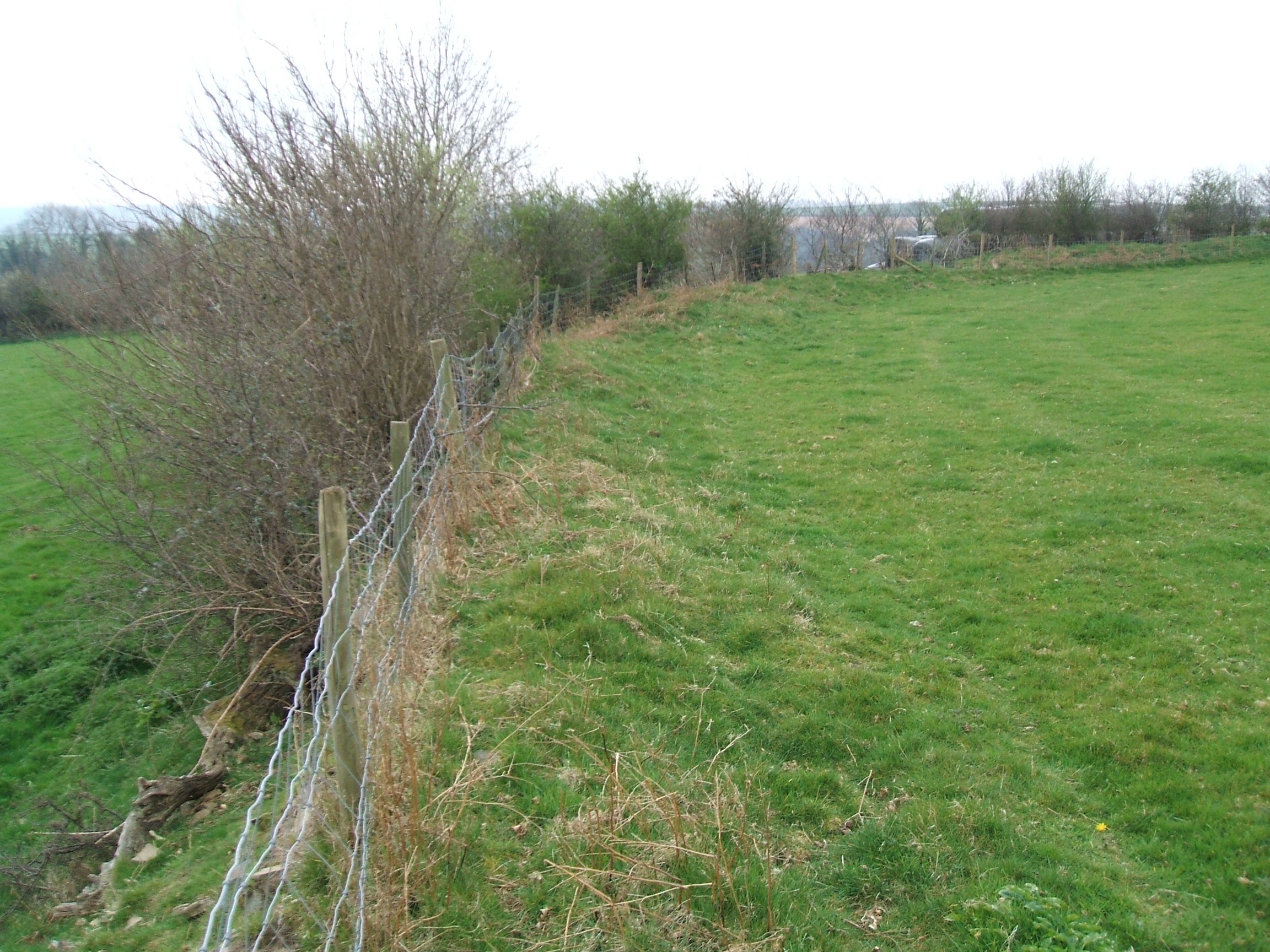
Castle Close

Castle Close is a circular earthwork located near Stoodleigh in Mid Devon, England at OS grid reference SS937181. It is described on maps as a settlement. Situated some 208 metres above sea level, overlooking the River Exe, it is most likely to be an Iron Age Hill fort or enclosure.

While the earthworks do not appear as pronounced as others nearby at Huntsham Castle, Cranmore Castle and Cadbury Castle they are still in a classical layout typical of an Iron Age hill fort or enclosure. These other Devon Hill forts are all in plain view from the centre of the enclosure, pointing to their all having been in use at the same time.
