= Cadbury Castle, Devon =

Hill fort in Devon

Coordinates: 50.8360°N 3.5431°W

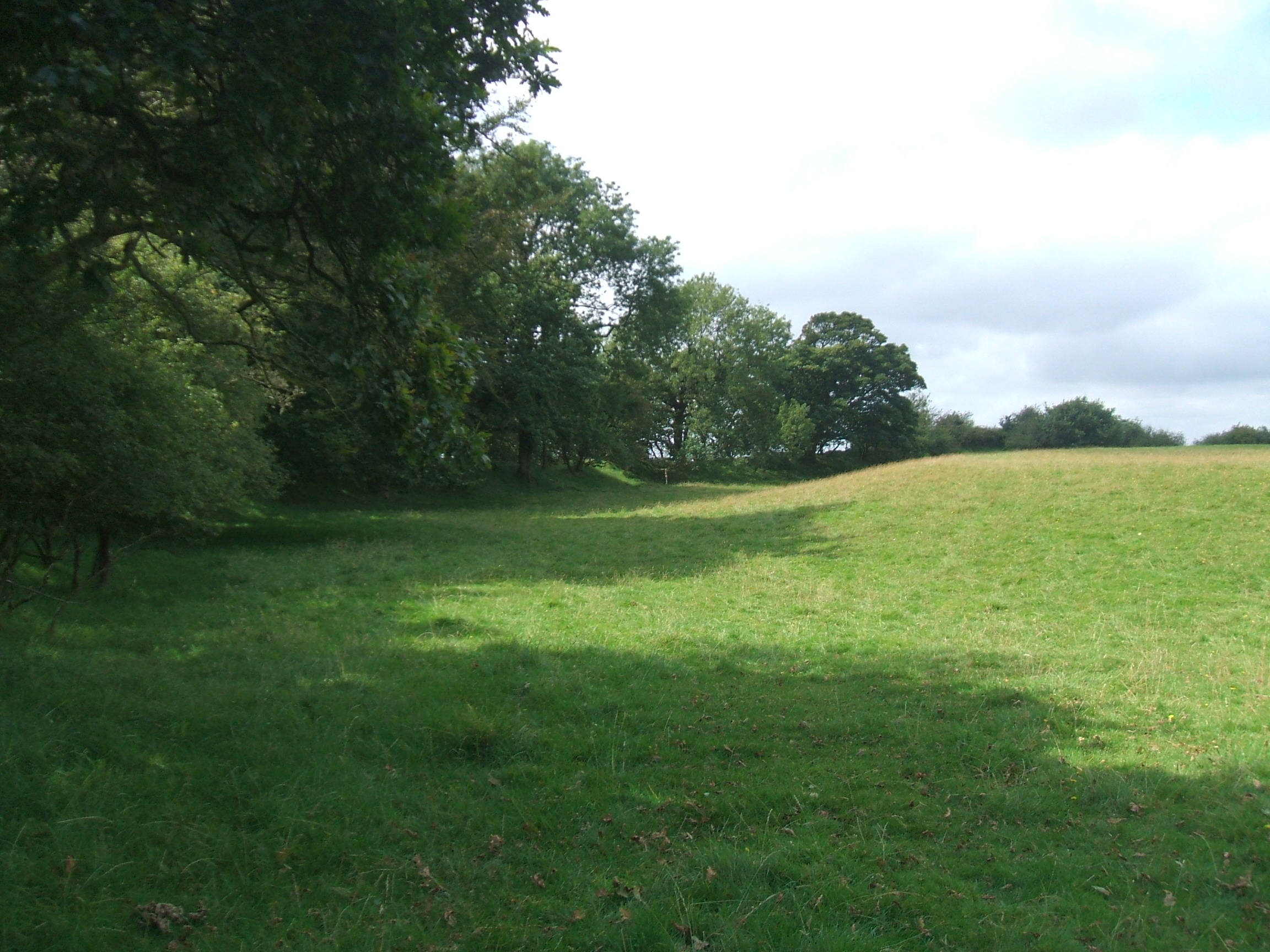
Site of Cadbury Castle

Cadbury Castle is an Iron Age Hillfort close to Bickleigh, Devon, England. It was later encamped by the Parliamentarian forces during the English Civil War under Thomas Fairfax when he laid siege to Bickleigh Castle.

The site is situated some 250 metres above sea level overlooking a series of valleys and down to the Exe Valley. Clear views are afforded of other hill forts including Cranmore Castle, Huntsham castle, Dolbury, Stoke Hill, Raddon Top, Posbury and Cotley Castle. Access is via a public footpath signposted from Cadbury village.
