= St Thomas, Exeter =

Area of Exeter, England

Coordinates: 50.716°N 3.540°W

St Thomas
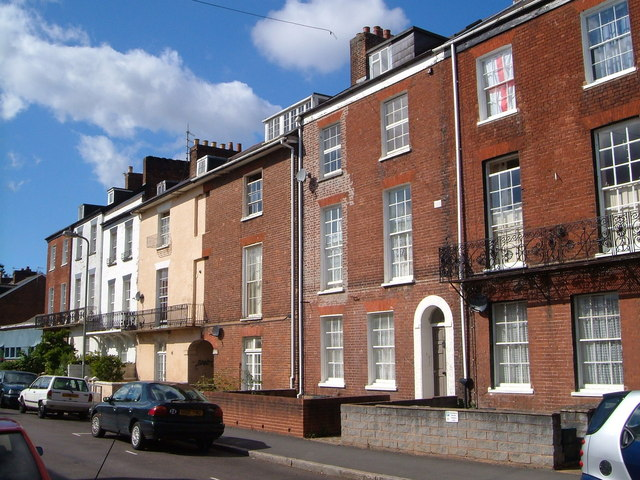
- Church Road

- St Thomas district ward in Exeter

- Location within Devon
- Population: 6,455 (2011)
- OS grid reference: SX9091
- District: Exeter
- Shire county: Devon
- Region: South West
- Country: England
- Sovereign state: United Kingdom
- Post town: EXETER
- Postcode district: EX2, EX4
- Dialling code: 01392
- Police: Devon and Cornwall
- Fire: Devon and Somerset
- Ambulance: South Western
- UK Parliament: Exeter

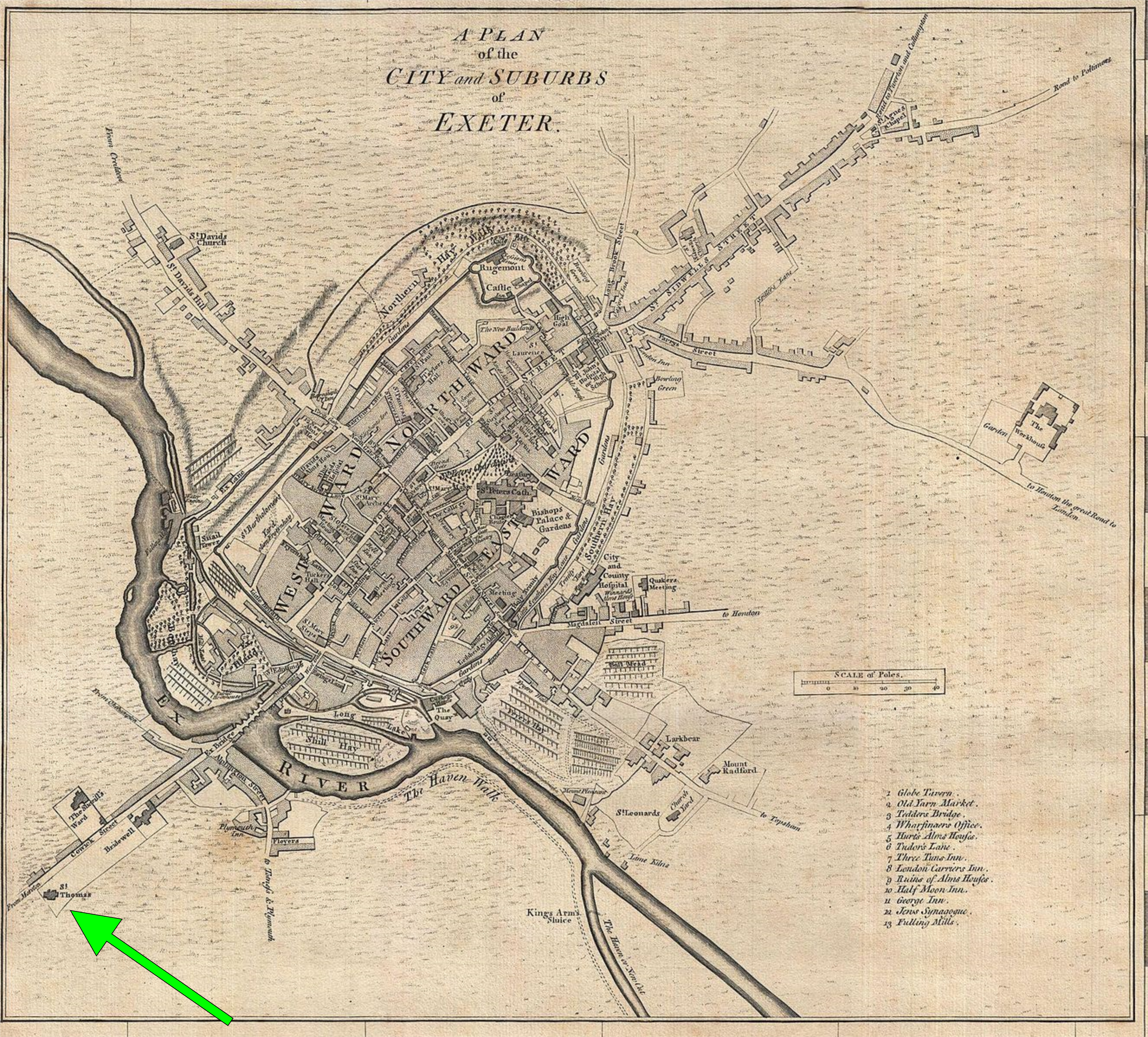
Location of St Thomas's Church (indicated by green arrow) on 1765 map of the City of Exeter by Benjamin Donne

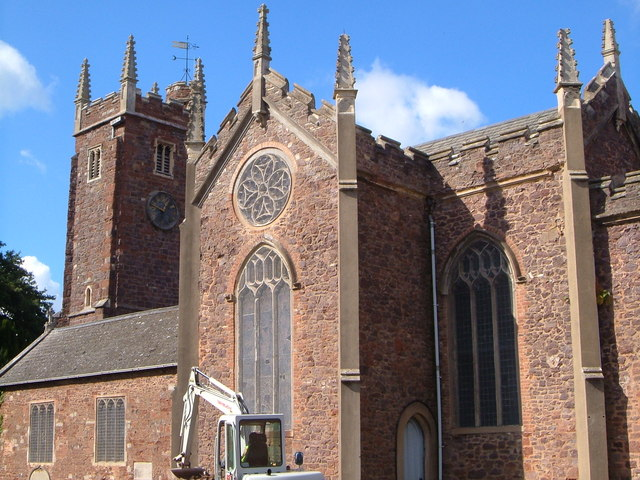
St Thomas's Church in 2006

St Thomas (St Thomas the Apostle's) is an area of Exeter and formerly a 3,700-acre (15 km^{2}) civil parish and registration district in Devon, England, on the western side of the River Exe, connected to Exeter by Exe Bridge. It has a number of pubs, places of worship, several schools and a large shopping precinct. The population, according to the 2001 census, is 6,246, increasing to 6,455 at the 2011 census.

In 2023, St Thomas was named one of the best places to live in Devon, noting its great dining, riverside walks and transport links, having been described as the 'Battersea of Exeter'.

St Thomas ward is currently politically represented by County and City Councillor Rob Hannaford and City Councillor Adrian Fullam.

It originally consisted of two detached parts, the main part of which was the former village of Cowick, to the west of the River Exe. The urban area built up here but was not originally part of Exeter. The other part, about a mile to the west of the main body of the parish, contained the hamlet of Oldridge and was transferred to the parish of Whitestone in 1884.

St Thomas the Apostle became an urban district in 1894 with the passing of the Local Government Act 1894, and was incorporated into the municipal borough of Exeter in 1900. The name survives for the central area of Exeter west of the river.

A St Thomas Rural District existed from 1894 to 1974.

St Thomas is served by Exeter St Thomas railway station.

== Parish Church of St Thomas the Apostle ==
The parish church of St Thomas stands outside the city walls of Exeter, immediately to the south-west of the city and separated from it by the River Exe. It is larger than any of the parish churches formerly encompassed by the city walls, thus within the city of Exeter proper. The mediaeval church burned down in 1645 during the Civil War, and was rebuilt before 1657. An arcade survives from the earlier church of 1412, but the present exterior is Gothic of 1646 with a north aisle of circa 1810 and a chancel of 1829. There are three varieties of Gothic style here, 17th century, Decorated (ca. 1810), and Perpendicular (Victorian). John Betjeman said little about it in his Collins Pocket Guide to English Parish Churches: the South (1968): only "fittings".

== Historic estates ==
Historic estates situated within the parish of St Thomas include:

- Bowhay House located on Dunsford Road.
- Cleve House, on Exwick Lane, seat of Thomas Northmore (c.1643-1713) a Barrister-at-Law, a Master in Chancery and a member of parliament for Okehampton in Devon 1695–1708, whose monument survives in St Thomas's Church.
- Cowick Barton located on Cowick Lane, formerly a Benedictine monastery
- Hayes Barton, located at the junction of Flowerpot Lane and Okehampton Street, dating from the late 13th century.
- Floyer Hayes for several centuries until the mid-1600s the seat of the Floyer family, located on the east side of Alphington Street.

== Notable people ==
- George Gliddon (1809–1857), an English-born American Egyptologist.
- Walter Skinner (1913–1994), first-class cricketer
