= Scheduled monuments and listed buildings in Exeter =

This is a list of scheduled monuments and listed buildings in the English city of Exeter, Devon.

== Scheduled monuments ==
- Exeter Cathedral Green
- Exeter city walls
- St Nicholas Priory
- Medieval Exe Bridge
- The remains of St Catherines Chapel (Catherine Street)
- Rougemont Castle
- The settlement of Danes Castle
- The remains of The Hall of the Vicar's Choral (South Street)
- Exeter Underground Passages

== Grade I listed buildings ==
- The Guildhall (High Street)
- Cathedral Church of Saint Peter (Exeter Cathedral)
- St Martin's Church (Cathedral Close)
- Mols coffee shop (Cathedral Close)
- No. 5 Cathedral Close
- No. 8, 9, and 9a Cathedral Close
- The Law Library (Cathedral Close)
- No. 10 Cathedral Close
- The Bishop's Palace (Palace Gate)
- Gatehouse to The Bishop's Palace (Palace Gate)
- Presentation of St Mary Covent School (Palace Gate)
- George's Chapel (South Street)
- St Mary Arches Church (Mary Arches Street)
- St Nicholas Priory (The Mint)
- Church of St Mary's Steps (West Street)
- The Customs House (The Quay)
- Quay House (The Quay)
- Church of St Michael's and All Angels (Mount Dinham)
- Church of St Thomas (Cowick Street)
- Church of St David's (St David's Hill)

== Grade II* listed buildings ==
- No. 40 High Street
- No. 41-42 High Street
- No. 46 High Street
- No. 225-226 High Street
- No. 227 High Street
- Church of St Stephen's (High Street)
- Church of St Petrock's (High Street)
- No. 1-2 Catherine Street
- No. 1 The Cloisters
- The Old Deanery (The Cloisters)
- Church House (Bear Street)
- No. 2 Cathedral Close
- No. 3 Cathedral Close
- No. 4 Cathedral Close
- No. 6 Cathedral close
- The Devon and Exeter Institution (Cathedral Close)
- The Devon County War Memorial and Processional Way
- Notaries House (Cathedral Close)
- No. 15-15a Cathedral Close
- No. 67 South Street
- Wynard's Hospital (Magdalan Street)
- Dean Clarke House (Former RD&E Hospital) (Southernhay)
- No. 1-10 Southernhay West
- No. 18-24 Southernhay West
- Southernhay House (Southernhay East), onetime residence of Sir Henry Russell, 2nd Baronet, an India mogul
- Chichester Place (Southernhay East)
- Barnfield Crescent
- No. 13-15 Dix's Field
- The Castle Courthouse (Rougemont Castle)
- Rougemont House (Castle Street)
- No. 1 Upper Paul Street
- Civic Hall Higher Market (Queen Street)
- Church of St Pancras (Guildhall Shopping Centre)
- The Synagogue (Mary Arches Street)
- St Olaves House (Barthowlomew Street)
- No. 21 The Mint
- The Church of St Olave (Fore Street)
- Tucker's Hall (Fore Street)
- No. 5-7 West Street
- The Harbourmaster's Office (The Quay)
- The Fish Market (The Quay)
- No. 1-4 King's Wharf (The Quay)
- No. 6-11 King's Wharf (The Quay)
- Warehouse Vaults (The Quay)
- Colleton Crescent
- Colleton Villa (Friar's Gate)
- Sidwell Street Methodist Church
- The Imperial Hotel (New North Road)
- Old Tudor House (Tudor Street)
- Chapel at St Anne's Almshouses (Old Tiverton Road)
- Bellair (Devon County Hall)
- Devon County Hall
- Old Matford House (Matford Road)
- No. 1-5 Pennsylvania Crescent
- No. 1-6 Pennsylvania Park

== See also ==
- Scheduled monuments in Devon
