= Cadbury Castle =

Cadbury Castle may refer to:

- Cadbury Castle, Devon, an Iron Age hill fort
- Cadbury Castle, Somerset, an Iron Age hill fort
