= Cowick, Devon =

Suburb of Exeter, Devon, England

Coordinates: 50.713°N 3.554°W

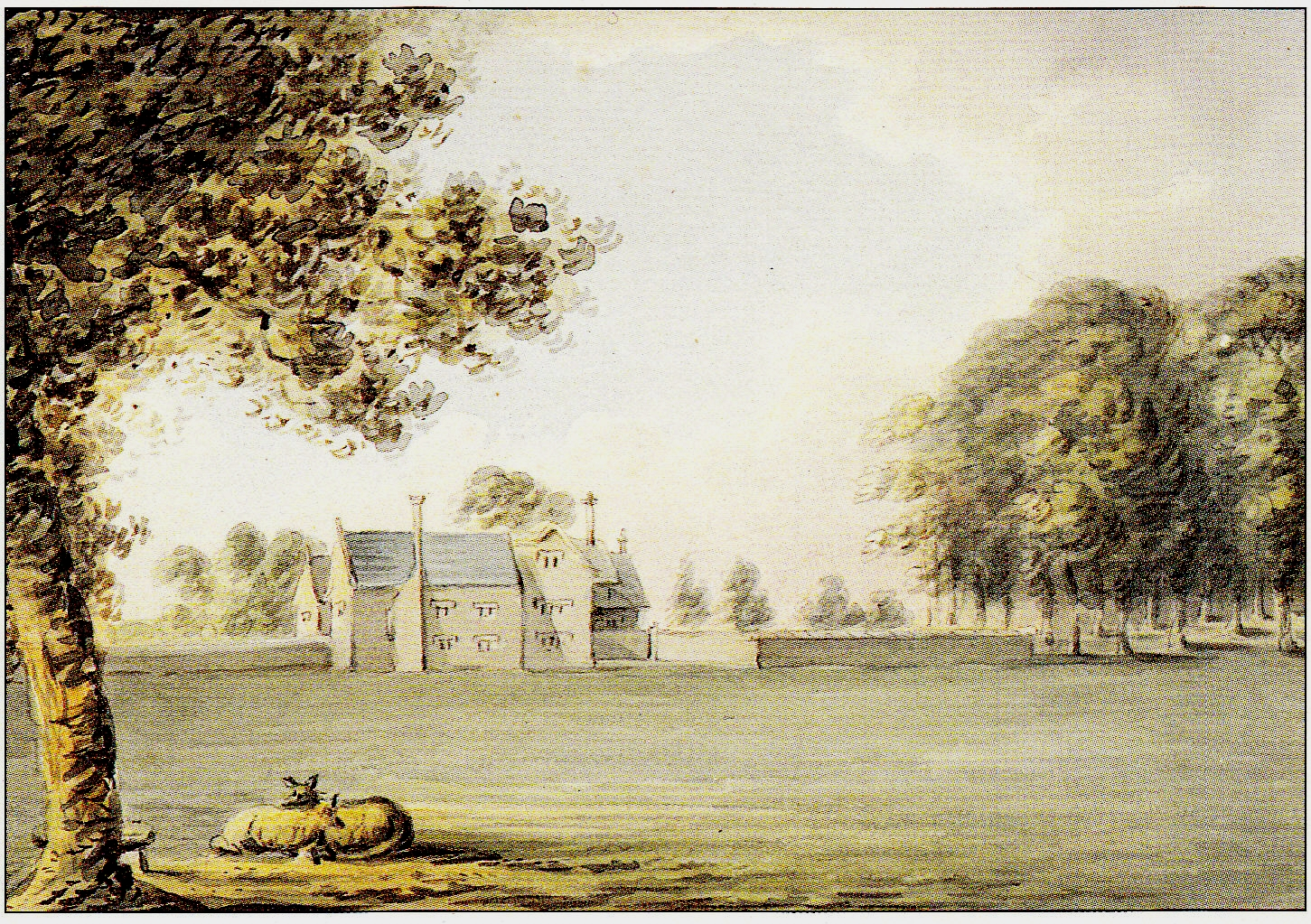
1801 watercolour of Cowick House, Exeter, Devon, when owned by "Counsellor White", by Rev. John Swete. Devon Record Office 564M/F1/221. Swete's Travel Journal records: "On the northern side of this house is a grove of uncommonly large elms and indeed throughout the grounds and in every hedge between them and Exeter this charming tree is seen in the highest luxuriance and plenty. Contiguous to these are also a few other trees of consequence and beauty: a magnificent walnut tree given in the foreground of the sketch and a beech or two"

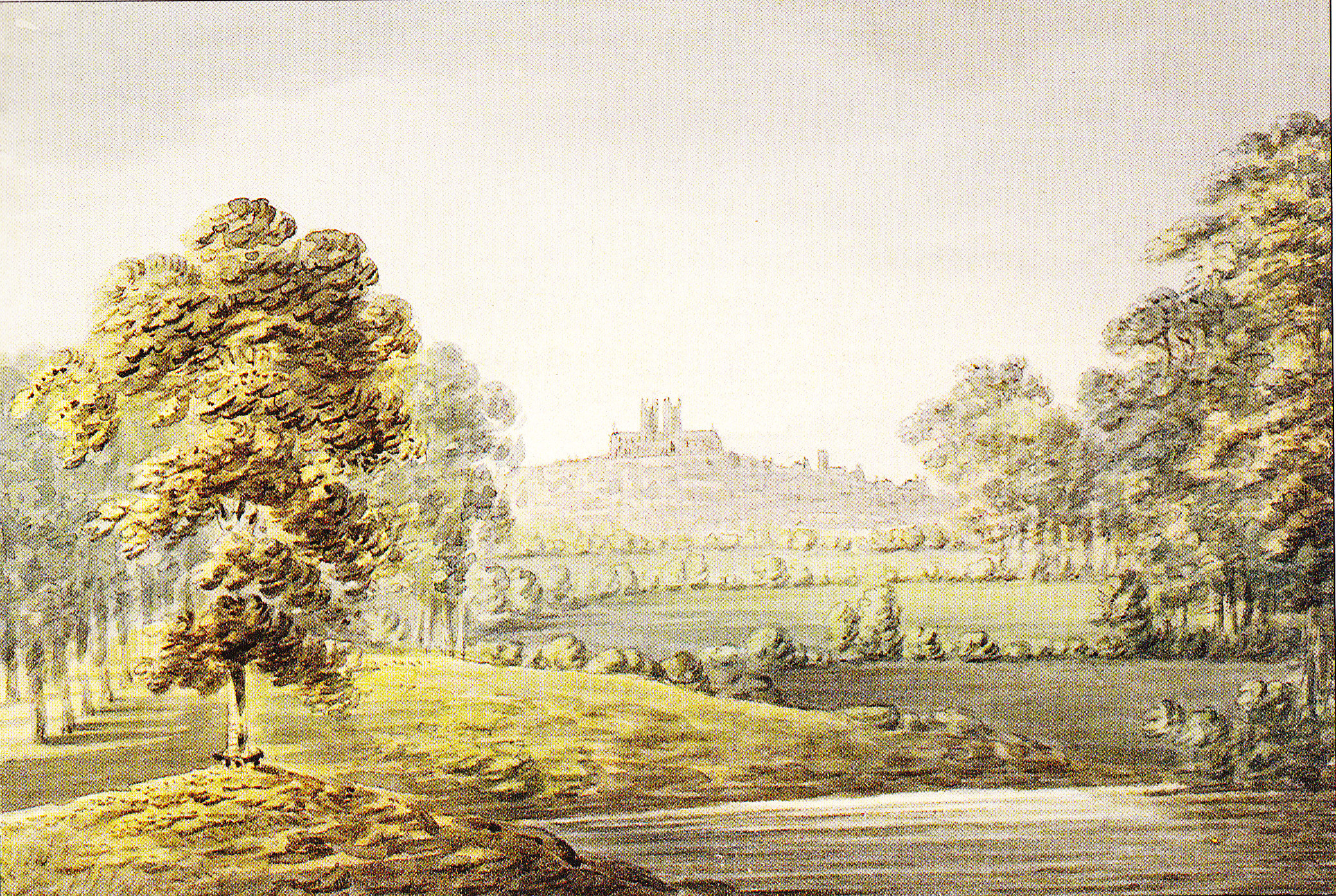
Watercolour of Exeter Cathedral viewed from Cowick, by Rev. John Swete dated 1801. Devon Record Office 564M/F1/223. Swete's Travel Journal records: "One of (the beech trees) in particular of high growth appears in the following view where through a break amid the successive ranges of elms Exeter is beheld with its turreted cathedral rising with lordly grandeur over the subjacent city; this is a scene of great picturesque beauty and I know no spot, in consequence of the profusion and disposition of its trees, from whence Exeter is seen to greater advantage"

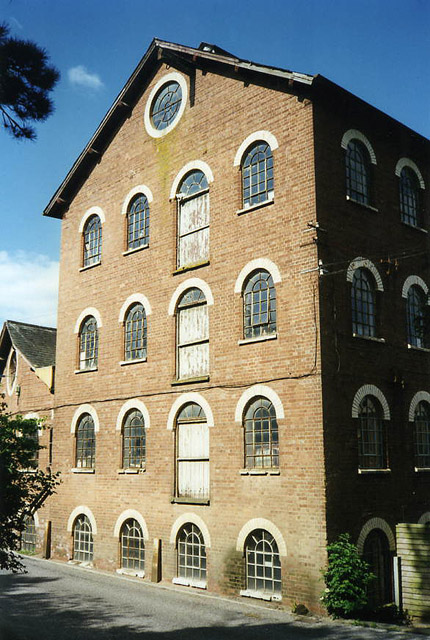
Exwick Mill, St Thomas, Exeter. A plaque on the mill wall reads: Exwick Mill was built by W. R. Mallett. A.D. 1886 on the site of Mills worked by Benedictine Monks of the Priory at Cowick A.D. 1325. Alfred Bodley Engineer, Brook & Ash Builders

Cowick is a suburb of the City of Exeter in Devon. Historically it was a manor situated in the parish of St Thomas, Exeter, within the hundred of Wonford. It was formerly the site of a Benedictine monastery.

== History ==
The manor of Coic is listed in Domesday Book of 1086 as the 106th of the 176 Devon landholdings of Baldwin the Sheriff, otherwise known as Baldwin FitzGilbert and Baldwin de Meulles. He held it in demesne. He was William the Conqueror's Sheriff of Devon and also held lands granted to him personally by that king in Devon which comprised the feudal barony of Okehampton. These included Exwick.

== Granted to Bec-Hellouin Abbey ==
On Baldwin's death his son and heir William FitzBaldwin made a gift of the manors of Cowick and Exwick, both in the parish of St Thomas, to the Benedictine Abbey of Bec-Hellouin in Normandy. A cell of the abbey was set up in Cowick with a Priory Church dedicated to Saint Andrew. Cowick Priory was endowed by its founder with tithes, rents and advowsons of Exwick and other nearby manors, including Spreyton. In St Michael's Church in Spreyton survives a lengthy Latin inscription carved into the timbers of the chancel roof, erected by Henry le Mayne, the last vicar presented by the prior and convent of Cowick, who held the advowson, instituted 23 August 1451. He rebuilt the chancel with aid from Richard Talbot, lord of the manor of Spreyton, and from "Robertus de Rouen de Recdenne, the last Prior of Cowick, and both their names are recorded in the inscription as follows:

Henricus de Mayne presbytre vicarius huius ecclesiae me fecit fieri anno domini 1451, Robertus de Rouen de Becdenne et Ricardus Talbot, armiger, dominus de Spreyton, ded(erun)t de bonis suis ad me faciendum. Orate pro animabus earum". ("Henry le Mayne, presbyter, vicar of this church made me (i.e. the roof) to come into existence in the Year of Our Lord 1451. Robert de Rouen de Becdenne and Richard Talbot, Esquire, gave from their goods towards making me. Pray for their souls").

== Notable burials ==
Within the Priory Church was buried on 5 February 1341Hugh de Courtenay, 9th Earl of Devon (1276-23 December 1340), feudal baron of Okehampton. and his wife Agnes de Saint John (d.1340), and his father, Sir Hugh de Courtenay (1251–1292) and his wife Eleanor le Despenser (d.1328).

== First suppression ==
During the reign of King Henry V (1413–1422) when England was at war with France, Cowick Priory, together with all other alien priories controlled from France, was suppressed in 1414 and the monks were expelled back to Normandy. In 1440 it was refounded by his successor King Henry VI (1422–1461) and was granted in 1451/2 to his new foundation of Eton College. Following the seizure of the throne from Henry VI by Edward IV in 1461, the new king removed Cowick Priory from the possession of Eton and re-granted it in 1463/4 to Tavistock Abbey. In 1467, with the deposed Henry VI still living and three years before his final short come-back of 1470, it was restored to Eton. Tavistock Abbey however maintained that the priory had held conventual status and ought to be served by "religious men yf eny coude be founde" and in 1478 it secured confirmation of the king's earlier grant to it.

== Dissolution ==
On the Dissolution of the Monasteries by King Henry VIII in 1537/8, Tavistock Abbey was surrendered to the King and the monastery estates, including the manors of Cowick and Exwick, were granted in 1539 to John Russell, 1st Baron Russell (1485-1554/5) (later created 1st Earl of Bedford).

== Russell, Earls of Bedford ==
A part of the old priory building survives today as Cowick Barton, now a public house, the modern address of which is Cowick Lane, St Thomas, Exeter. The priory building was rebuilt by Lord Russell in the 1540s, possibly as a residence for the bailiff of his vast Devon estates granted to him by the king, consisting chiefly of the lands of Tavistock Abbey. The present building is made from red Heavitree stone and is shaped in the form of an E, characteristic of the Elizabethan period. It retains most of its period stone mullioned windows. A stained-glass window formerly in the house depicting King Edward VI as Prince of Wales is now in the collection of the Victoria and Albert Museum. Some period plaster reliefs also survive, one showing a nun caring for some children and another of a long-haired maiden, both standing on the head of an obese friar. A surviving fireplace with heraldic arms is inscribed with the date "1657".

== Pate ==
In 1641 The Earl of Bedford sold the property to the Pate family. Robert Pate (d.1677) bequeathed it to his son, but charged with an annual payment of 20 shillings to the poor.

== Prideaux, Speke, White ==
By marriage the property passed to Amy Fraunceis (d.1703/4), daughter of John Fraunceis of Combe Flory, Somerset, and wife of Edmund Prideaux (1634–1702), MP, of Forde Abbey and from her to her daughter Katherine Prideaux, who had married in 1679 at Exeter Sir John Speke of Whitelackington, Somerset. Katherine had no children and bequeathed it to Mr James White. White continued to make an annual payment to charity and gave 30 shillings to maintain a schoolmistress to instruct in reading four poor children of the parish of St Thomas. In addition the property was also charged with the obligation to pay annually the sum of six pence to forty needy persons in the parish. Cowick was the birthplace of the painter John White Abbott (1763–1851), grandson of its purchaser James White, who restored the building.

== Subsequent ownership ==
In 1920 75 acres of the estate was sold. By 1963 the house was semi-derelict and the whole property was purchased by a brewery and converted into a public house.

== Modern Day Cowick ==
Nowadays Cowick is a large suburb of Western Exeter and until boundary changes came into effect in 2016, it was a ward, that had a population of 5,650 in 2011. Cowick has no formal high street but the main road in the area is known as Dunsford Road and as you go further east, Cowick Street. There is however a small cluster of businesses on Bowhay Lane and on the western side of Buddle Lane. Cowick is bounded by the Exeter districts of St Thomas to the east and Exwick to the north, and the villages of Pocombe Bridge to the west and Ide, Devon to the south. Due to its location in the west of Exeter and near the A30 road, many commuters from Okehampton pass through the area towards the city centre. The nearest railway station is Exeter St Thomas.

== Sources ==
- Cokayne, G. E. (1916). Gibbs, Vicary & Doubleday, H. Arthur (eds.). The Complete Peerage of England, Scotland, Ireland, Great Britain and the United Kingdom, extant, extinct or dormant (Dacre to Dysart). Vol. 4 (2nd ed.). London: The St Catherine Press.
- Richardson, Douglas (2011). Everingham, Kimball G. (ed.). Magna Carta Ancestry: A Study in Colonial and Medieval Families. Vol. I (2nd ed.). Salt Lake City. ISBN 9781461045205.
