= Francis Towne =

English painter (1739–1816)

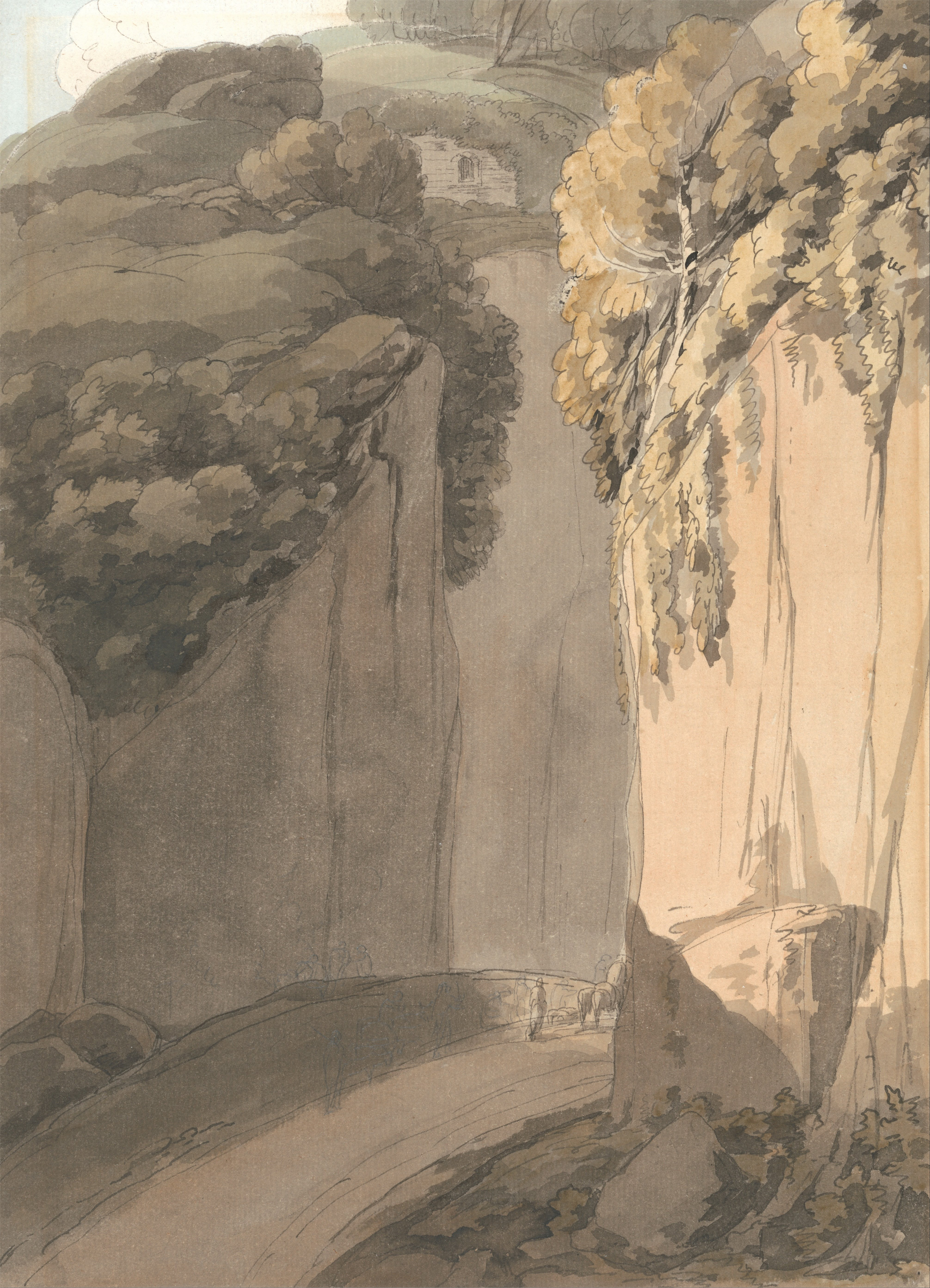
Entrance to the Grotto at Posilippo, Naples, 1781, little reworked

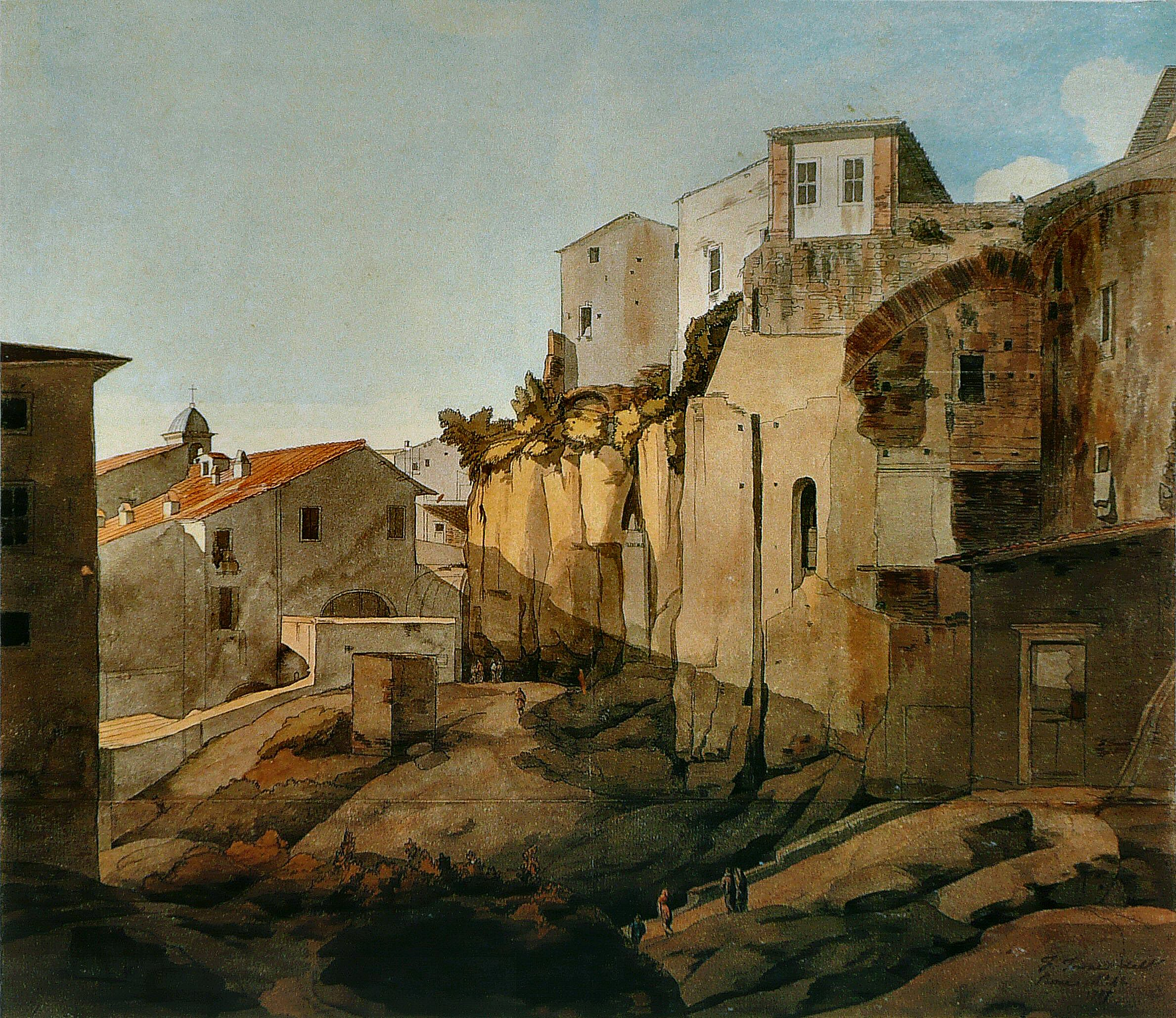
The Tarpeian Rock, Rome, 1780, reworked later

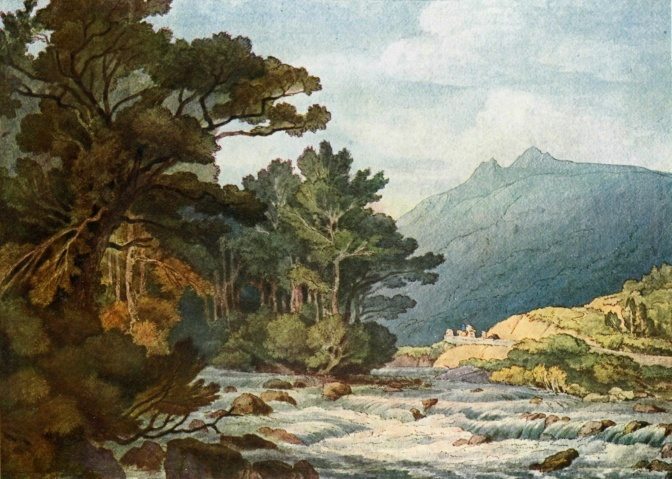
On The Dart

Francis Towne (1739 – 7 July 1816) was a British watercolour painter of landscapes that range from the English Lake District to Naples and Rome. After a long period of obscurity, his work has been increasingly recognised from the early 20th century onwards.

== Biography ==
Towne was born in Isleworth in Middlesex, the son of a corn chandler. In 1752 he was apprenticed to a leading coach painter in London, Thomas Brookshead. In 1759 he won a design prize from the Society of Arts, and studied for a while at St Martin's Lane Academy; according to his pupil John White Abbott many years later, around this time he also studied under the court portraitist John Shackleton.

In 1763 Towne was employed by a coach painter called Thomas Watson in Long Acre, and went to Exeter on business, where he soon settled. He had already begun painting in oils and also taught drawing, and now he began to accept commissions from wealthy families in Devon. After a tour of north Wales in 1777, undertaken with his friend, the Exeter lawyer James White (1744–1825), he began to specialize in watercolours.

In 1780 he travelled to Rome, where he knew, and painted with, John "Warwick" Smith, who had been there since 1776, and William Pars, a friend from London. He spent a month in Naples in March 1781, staying with Thomas Jones. After returning to Rome, and excursions to Tivoli and other nearby areas, he travelled home to England with Smith, passing over the Alps. His works from this trip include over 200 sheets, and 54 large views of Rome which emphasize the ancient ruins rather than the post-classical sights or the contemporary life of the city. These 54 were later exhibited as a group in 1805 but never sold; he painted copies of them instead when he got commissions. Many were reworked later, starting around 1800, in the heavier and more conventional style he had by then adopted. At his death Towne left the group to the British Museum, where they remain.

On his return to Devon, he was asked by Sir Thomas and Lady Acland of Killerton to paint some views in Devon and North Wales, and in 1786 he went on a painting tour of the Lake District. He painted versions of his watercolours, of Rome and elsewhere, in oils, mainly to submit to the Royal Academy, but though several were exhibited his eleven attempts from 1788 on to be elected a member all failed, and he gave up in 1803. He remained in Exeter painting and teaching, achieving reasonable success. In the last years of his life he returned to live in London. He married Jeannette Hilligsberg, a French dancing mistress aged 27, on the 5th of August 1807, but she died in April 1808.

He remained an obscure figure until the early 20th century, so that the collector Paul Oppé was able to acquire numbers of important works very cheaply. Oppé was greatly impressed, especially with Towne's elegant and somewhat stylised early manner, which chimed with trends in English painting at the time, "the taste of our own century for flat colourful pattern-making", as Andrew Wilton put it in 1993. After making contact with descendants of Towne's student and friend, John Herman Merivale, Oppé discovered a collection of largely unseen works which Towne had bequeathed to Merivale. He catalogued the works and published an article about the artist in a 1919 volume of the Walpole Society journal. These writings helped to create a revival of interest in Towne, and more works began to appear on the market. By the 1950s he was widely recognised as an important figure and his works were owned by many museums, especially the British Museum and the Yale Center for British Art. A catalogue raisonné of the artist's work is published by the Paul Mellon Centre for Studies in British Art.

From January 2016, the British Museum held an exhibition of the watercolours he painted in Rome, and art critic Jonathan Jones commented:

Francis Towne, who failed 11 times to get elected to the Royal Academy but had the foresight to leave these watercolours to the British Museum when he died in 1816, may not be a famous British artist. He is, however, as this entrancing exhibition reveals, a great one.
