= The Fisherman's Cot =

Inn in Bickleigh, Devon, UK

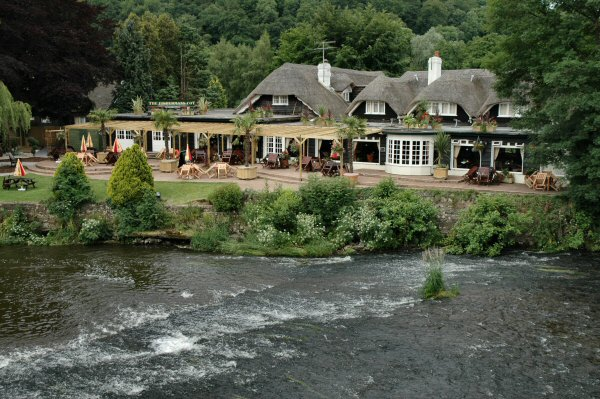

- Devon

General information
- Location: Bickleigh, Mid Devon, Devon, England
- Coordinates: 50°51′29″N 3°30′49″W

Other information
- Number of rooms: 21

The Fisherman's Cot is an inn on the A3072 road to the northwest of Bickleigh near Tiverton, in northeastern Devon. It is operated by Marston's Inns and lies on the River Exe.

== Accommodation ==
Situated on the River Exe, the inn contains 21 rooms. Although the inn looks very old, it was only built in 1933 as a private fishing lodge for Bickleigh Castle, located nearby in the woods behind the inn. The English Inns website cites the inn as "one of the most picturesque inns in the southwest of England", given its quaint river setting and thatched roof. The most scenic rooms with river views are said to be Rooms 10 and 11. In 2008, the rooms were reported to cost £69.95 per night. The Fisherman's Cot also has a function room which is often used for meetings, evening events and wedding receptions.

=== Cuisine ===
The inn has a carvery and is said to serve good-quality meat and fish dishes, such as herbed stuffed trout, mussels and Aberdeen Angus burgers. The inn is reported to have obtained the rights to fish a 3/4 mile stretch of the River Exe, providing the restaurant with an abundance of fresh fish to serve. The Waterside Bar of the inn overlooks the river and the bridge.

== Bridge Over Troubled Water connection ==
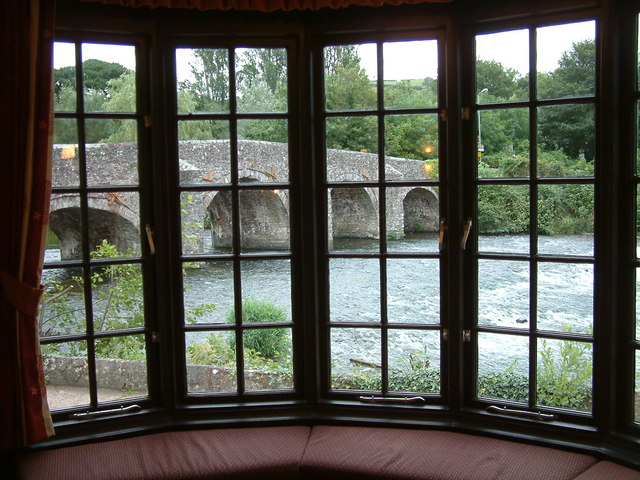
Interior view of the bridge

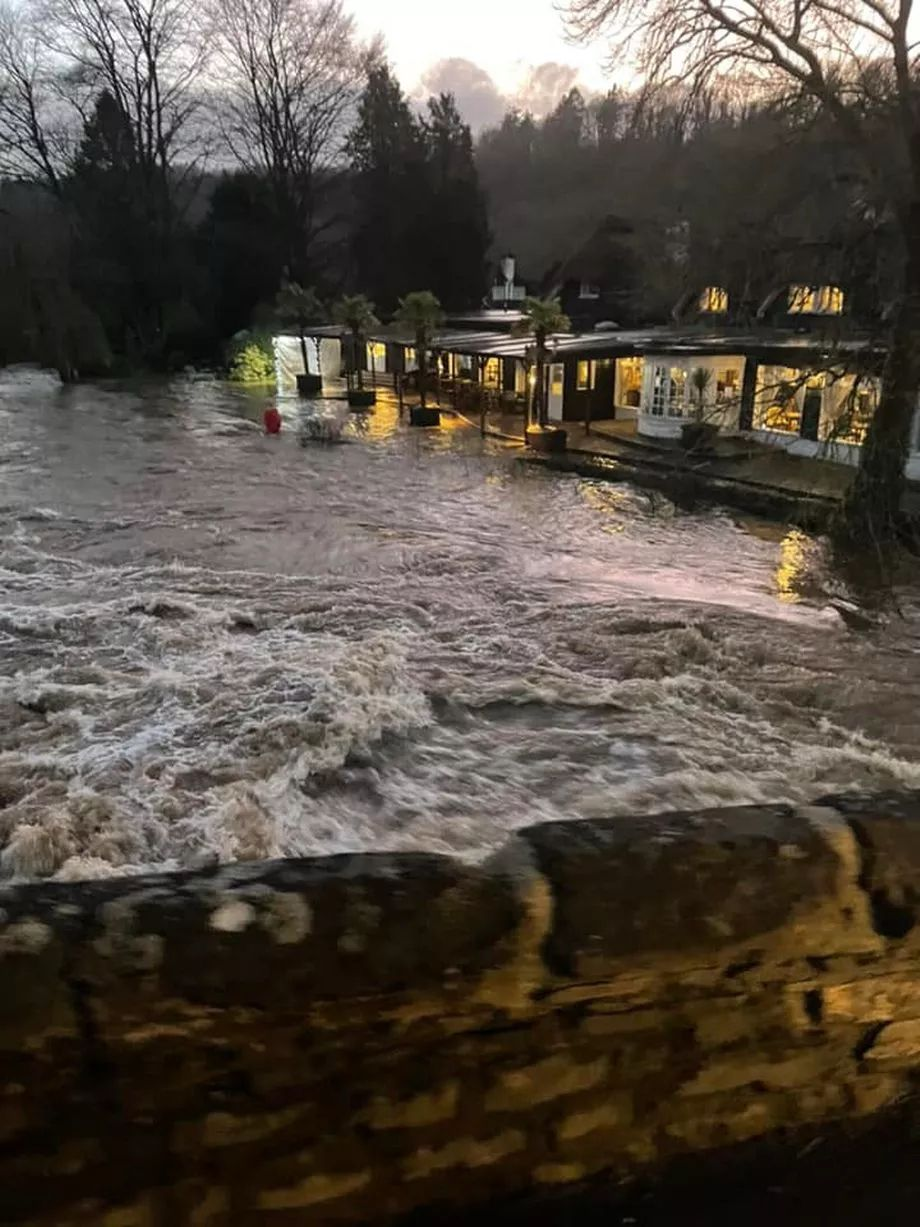
Flood at Fisherman's Cot - from Bickleigh Bridge (photo Lee Woodman)

The inn overlooks the medieval 16th-century Bickleigh Bridge which was said since the 1960s to have been the inspiration for the song Bridge Over Troubled Water. Paul Simon stayed at The Fisherman's Cot in the 1960s whilst performing nearby in Exeter. During his stay at the inn in Room Six, the river had flooded its banks and when he later wrote the famous song it was widely believed to have been the inspiration for the song with the bridge. The rumour was reported to have been quashed in 2003 when Art Garfunkel claimed that Paul Simon had been inspired to write the song from a hymn book, ignoring the fact that lyrics frequently combine multiple significances.
