= Hillsborough, Devon =

Nature reserve in Devon, England

Coordinates: 51.209°N 4.103°W

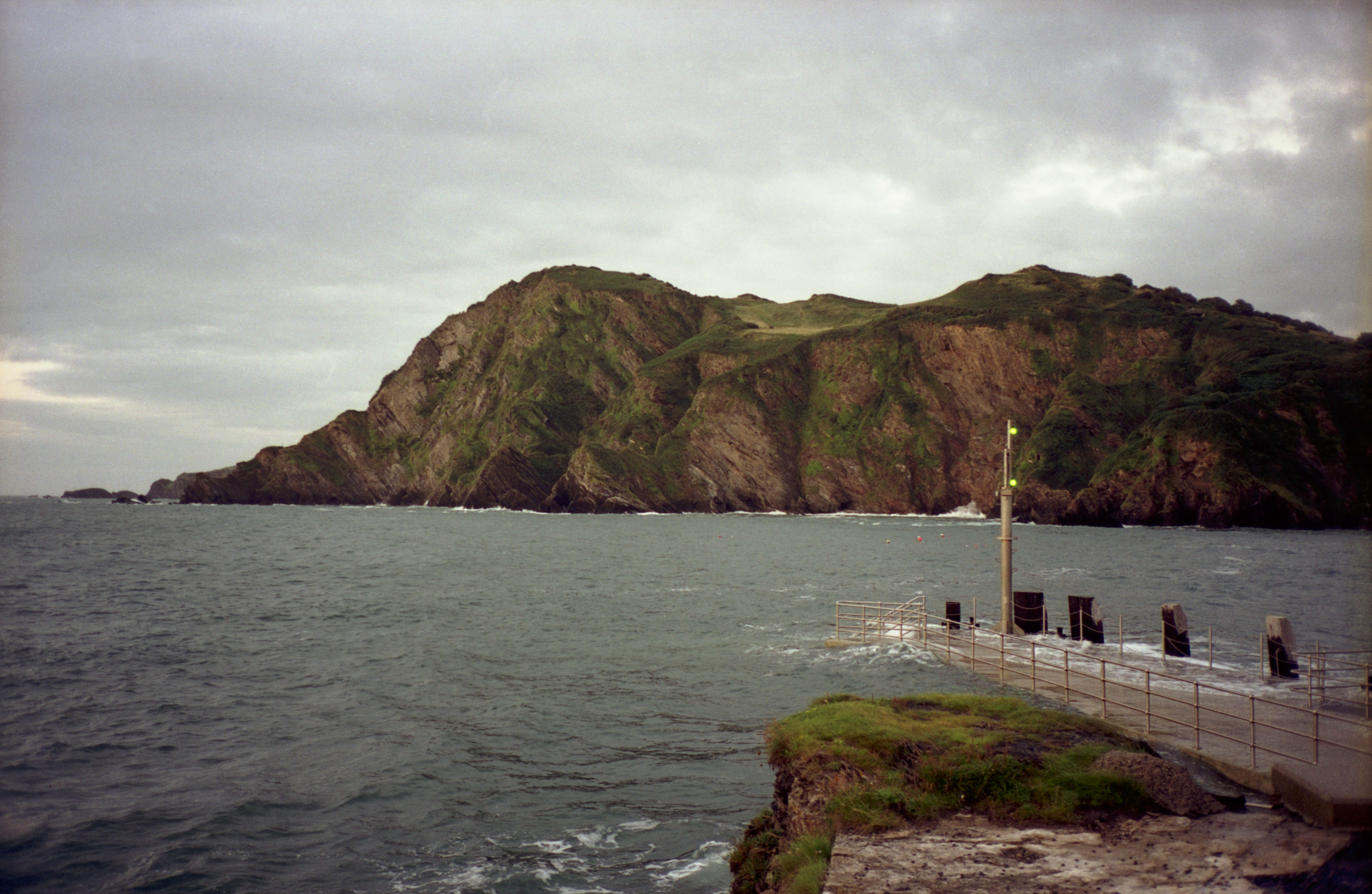
Hillsborough viewed from Ilfracombe harbour, late evening.

Hillsborough is a local nature reserve in Ilfracombe, North Devon. It is known locally as the sleeping elephant. It was bought by the local council in the late nineteenth century to prevent development on the site. As well as a pleasant coastal area where visitors may roam, it includes the remains of an Iron Age hill fort.

== The nature reserve ==
Hillsborough nature reserve, known locally as the sleeping elephant, is part of the North Devon's Biosphere Reserve, a predominantly agricultural region of north Devon centred on Braunton Burrows. Hillsborough is a rolling grassy cliff top area close to Ilfracombe. The nature reserve includes the remains of a hill fort which is a Scheduled Ancient Monument. The site was purchased by Ilfracombe Urban District Council in the 1890s to prevent it being developed. It provides an open access area with footpaths and natural scenery for the enjoyment of visitors and is traversed by the South West Coast Path. The site is now owned by North Devon Council and is included among the North Devon Areas of Outstanding Natural Beauty.

== The fort ==
Hillsborough is the site of an Iron Age hill fort atop the cliff on a promontory at approx 115 metres above sea level. The fort takes the classic shape of a promontory reinforced and cut off landwards by a defensive earthworks. These consist of two linear banks and ditches, oriented northwest to southeast, and contouring across the slope. For an Iron Age fort in northern Devon, the length of these banks, at 280 m (900 ft), is large. There is a clearly defined gateway near the eastern end of both banks, which is likely to have been the main entrance to the interior of the fort. Research using earth resistance and gradiometer surveys has produced good data, but interpretation is difficult because landscaping of the area was performed in Victorian times.

The Ordnance Survey Map of Britain in the Iron Age shows Hillsborough as multivallate and one of the two largest enclosures in Devon along with Cranmore Castle at over 15 acres, since the size of the enclosure today is less than half this; this must be based on more than half of the enclosure being lost to coastal erosion.
