= Cranmore Castle =

Iron Age earthwork in Devon, England

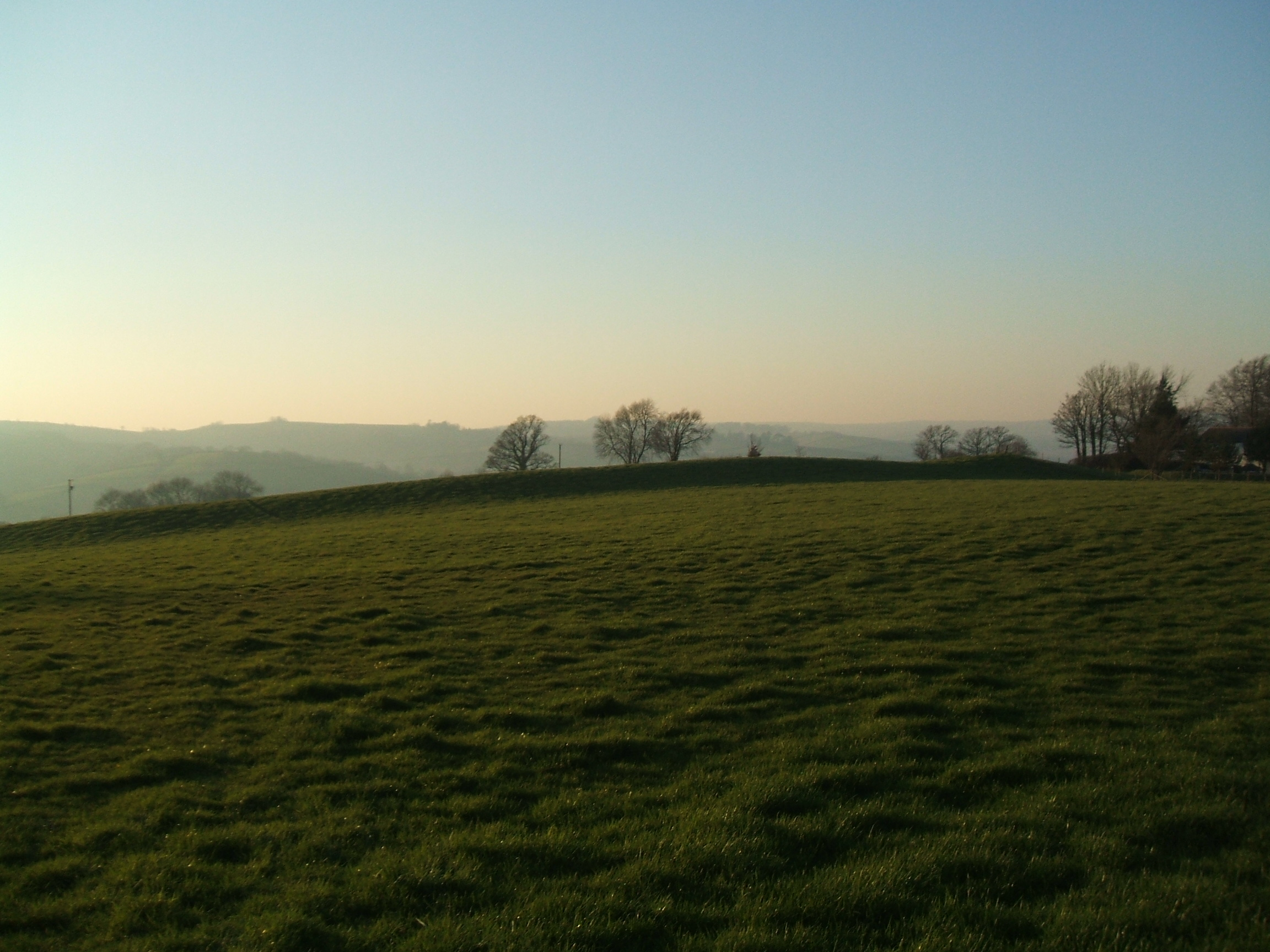
- Cranmore Castle

- Location of the site in Devon
- 50°53′45.6″N 3°28′55.2″W
- Location: Near Tiverton, Devon, England

Cranmore Castle is an Iron Age earthwork situated on a hillside above the Devon town of Tiverton in south-west England. Its National Grid reference is SS958118. It is an English Heritage scheduled monument, and has been given a National Monument number of 34256.

The earthwork is widely described in guidebooks and histories as an Iron Age hill fort though more recent archaeological evaluations and histories, such as Mike Sampson's recently published work, point out that it seems inefficient as a fortification, since it is overlooked from the south by the higher slope of Exeter Hill/Newtes Hill. The earthwork is also unusual in that the area it encloses slopes from 120 metres (390 ft) to 170 metres (560 ft) above sea level. This arrangement does however offer clear lines of sight to Cadbury Castle, Castle Close below Stoodleigh up the Exe Valley, Huntsham Castle, Hembury fort and other significant hills and earthworks, suggesting that all were contemporary. It also manages to overlook the confluence of the rivers Lowman and Exe and the forded crossings on those rivers, which a higher position would not allow.

The hillside that Cranmore Castle stands above is called Skrink Hills or Shrink Hills in various early histories of the area. and it is from there that Thomas Fairfax's artillery laid siege to Tiverton Castle. The promontory of land that links Cranmore to the edge of Newtes Hill is traversed by the old Exeter Road, which travels past the earthwork on its way from Tiverton to Exeter. The hill and road have latterly been known as Exeter Hill, and this road almost certainly follows the path of a prehistoric trackway.

Current theories about the nature of the earthwork suggest that it might have been a winter enclosure for livestock or a market site, though the earthworks are very substantial for such applications and could even point to a tribal oppidum. Certainly the area would be large enough. The Ordnance Survey Map of Southern Britain in the Iron Age shows Cranmore as the largest enclosure in Devon (along with Hillsborough) at over 15 acres (61,000 m^{2}).

During the Prayer Book Rebellion of 1549 Cranmore Castle became the site of a fierce battle fought between the two sides over whether a child should be baptised according to the 'new' religion or the 'old'. The battle took place near a small chapel that stood at one corner of the site, near the road. The chapel was demolished in the 17th century, and in 1687 bones and musket shots thought to be from the battle were discovered.

The etymology of the name Cranmore Castle is unclear. Cranmore is not a local name and does not fit with any local placenames. No record of Cranmore seems to exist in any early records. It is possible that the name is derived from the battle described above. The archbishop at the time of the Prayer Book Rebellion was Thomas Cranmer so it is possible it derives from a variation of 'Cranmer Castle' in reference to the battle fought there.
