= John White Abbott =

English painter

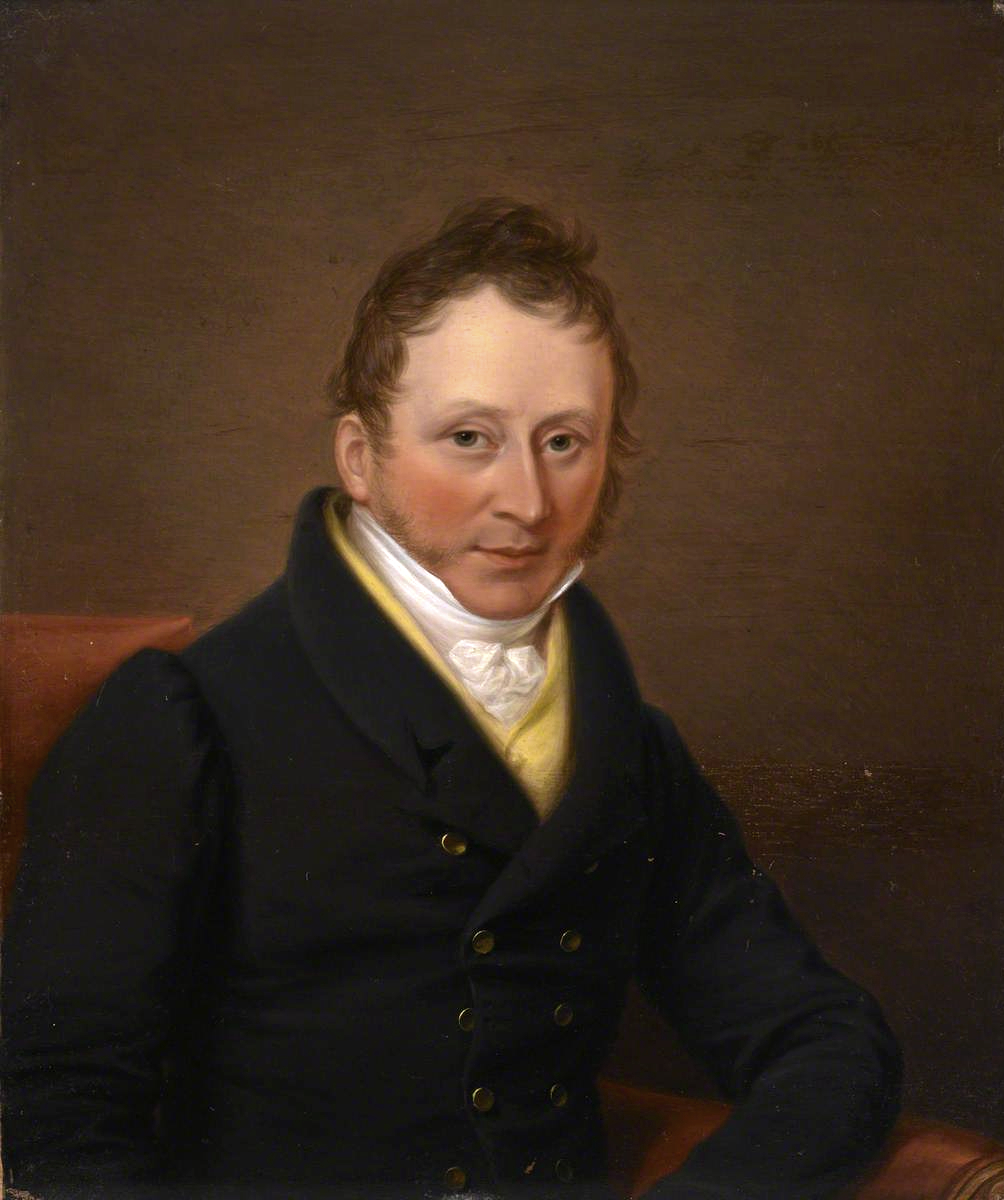
John White Abbott, portrait c.1820

John White Abbott (13 May 1763 – 1851) was an English surgeon and apothecary in Exeter, remembered as a keen amateur painter in both watercolour and oils. His watercolours are close in style to those of his teacher, Francis Towne.

== Life ==
Abbott was born on 13 May 1763 at Cowick near Exeter, Devon. He came from a wealthy family, which owned many estates in Exeter, one of which he inherited in 1825.

By profession a surgeon and apothecary, he was a keen amateur painter in both watercolour and oils. He studied in Exeter with Francis Towne, to whom he was also a friend and patron, and his watercolour style was based on Towne's. His work was primarily watercolour landscapes, for which he toured to the Lake District, along with oil history paintings. After inheriting an estate at the age of 62, he retired there and was appointed a deputy lieutenant of Devonshire in 1831.

Abbott exhibited regularly at the Royal Academy between 1795 and 1805; he is last recorded exhibiting there in 1822. He had a series of etchings of his paintings created which was nearly complete at the time of his death. He made a sketching tour to Scotland and the Lake District in 1791. It is believed Abbott never sold any of his paintings, and most of his works were retained by his family until well into the 20th century. Despite this, in his lifetime he was better known than his teacher, Francis Towne, some of whose Italian views he copied.

== Gallery ==
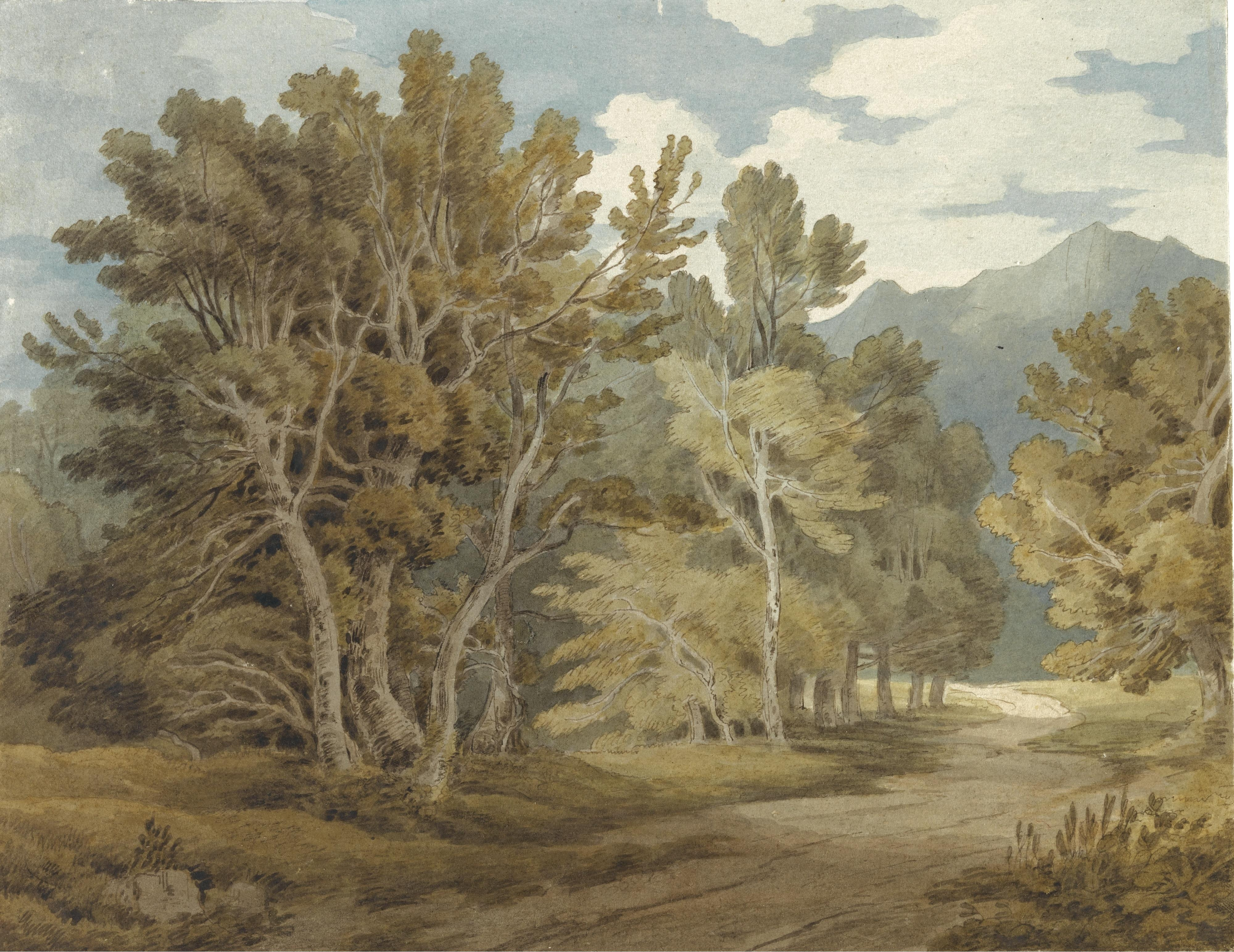
Gowbarrow Park, Ullswater, Cumbria, watercolour, 1791

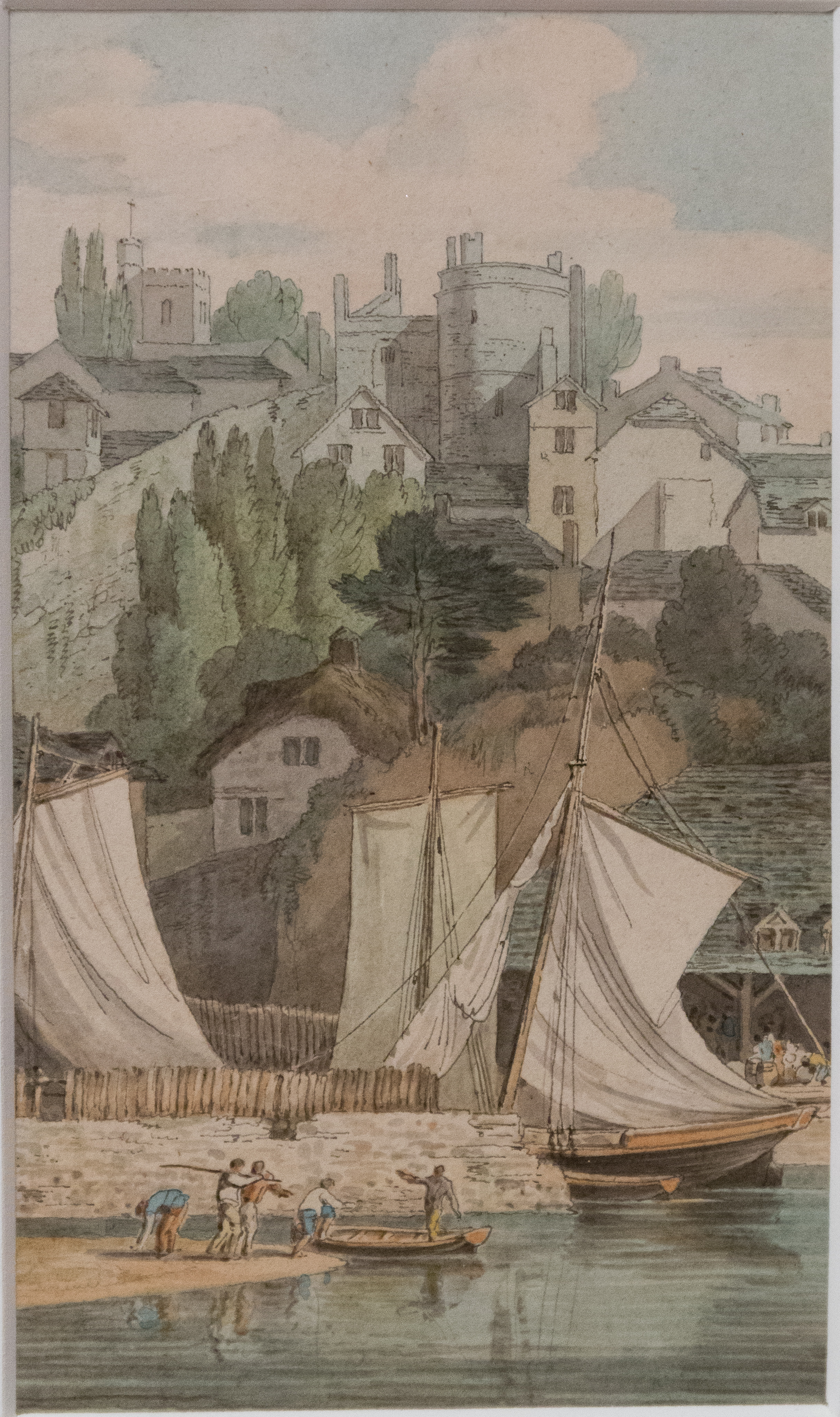
Near the Quay, Exeter, watercolour, 1800s

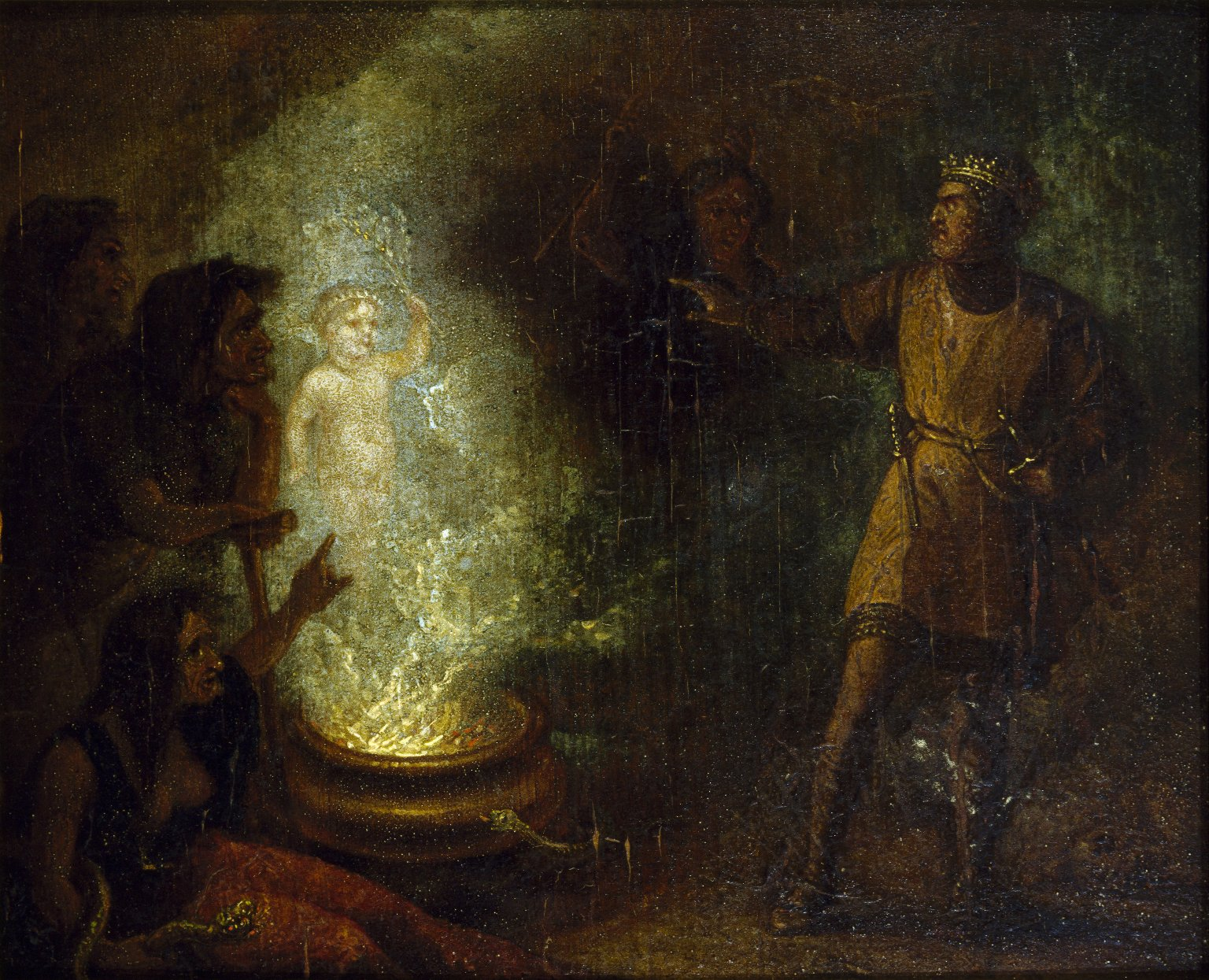
Macbeth recoiling from the apparition of the crowned child, oil, 1829

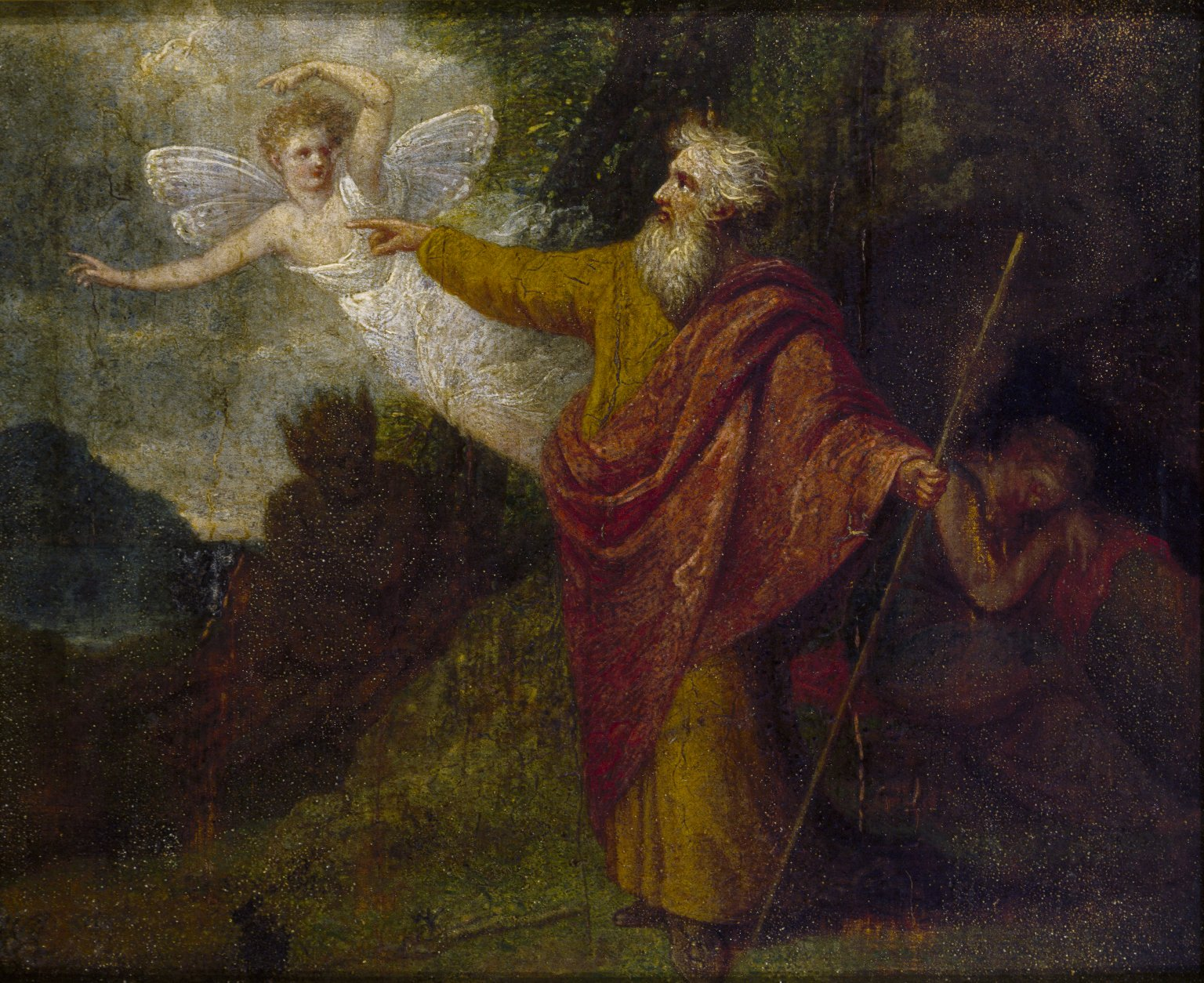
Prospero commanding Ariel, oil, 1829

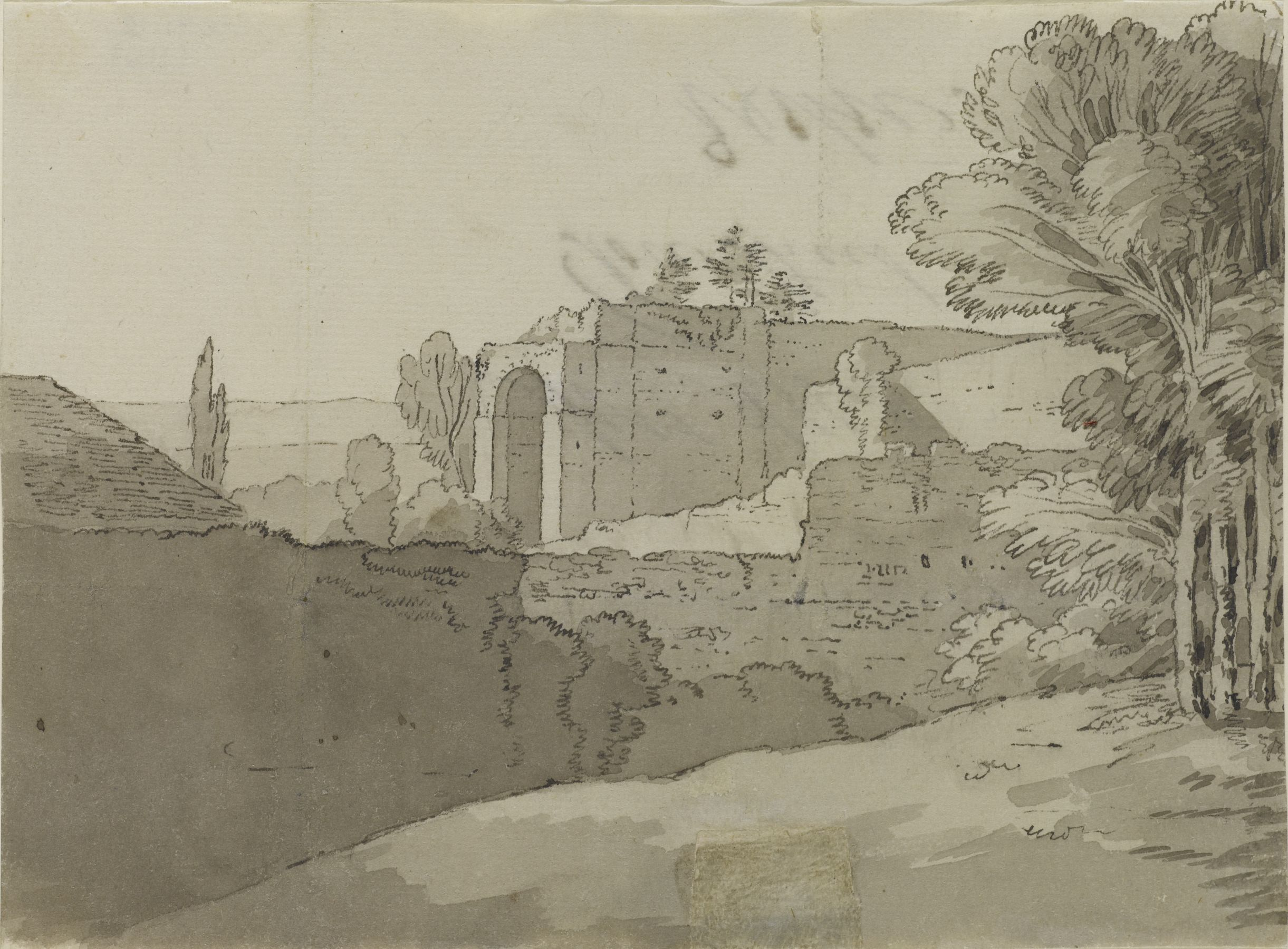
The Remains of Exeter Castle, pen and ink on paper, 1800s

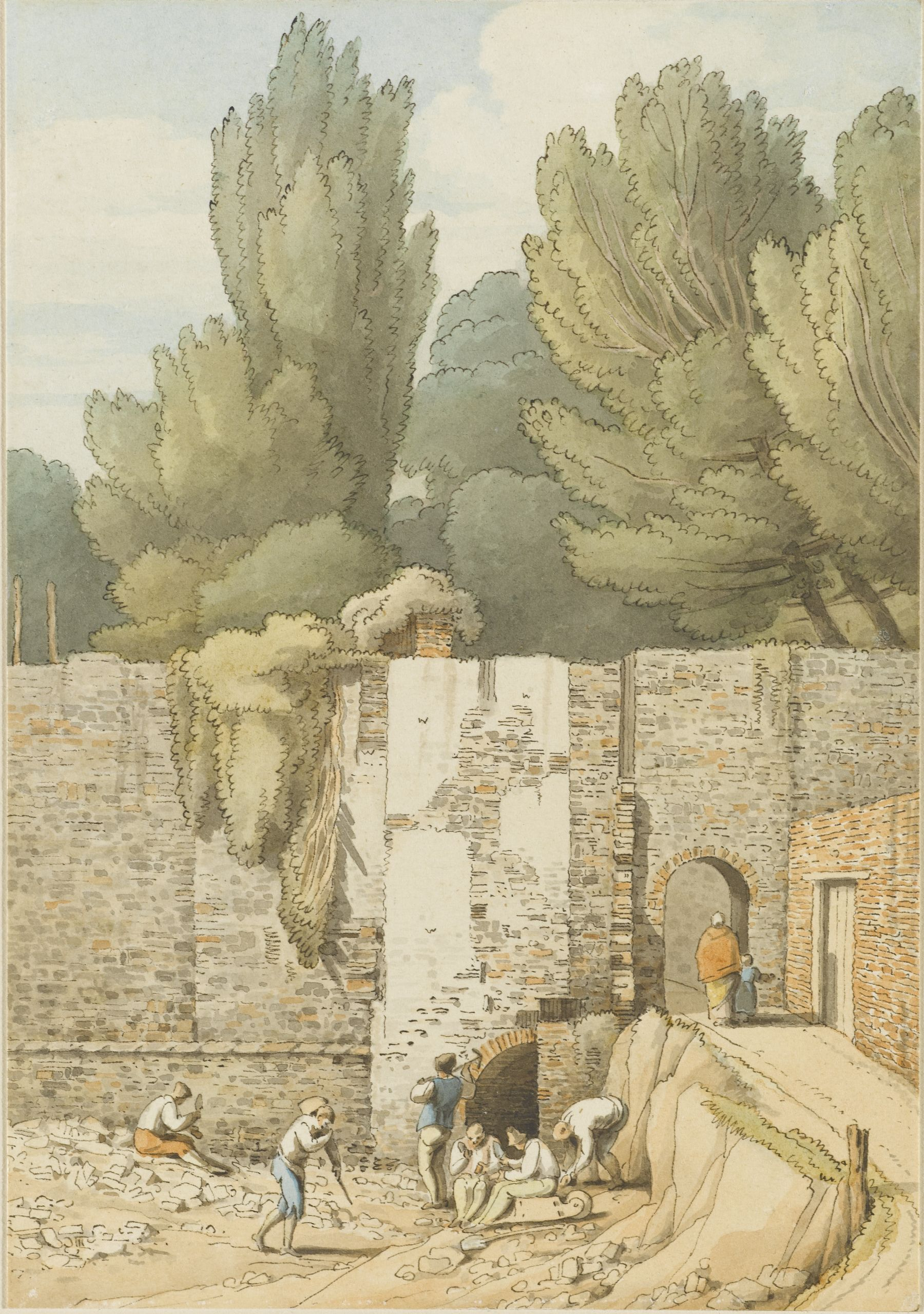
Entrance to the grounds of the Bishop's Palace, Exeter behind the first house in Southernhay, pen and ink on paper, 1814

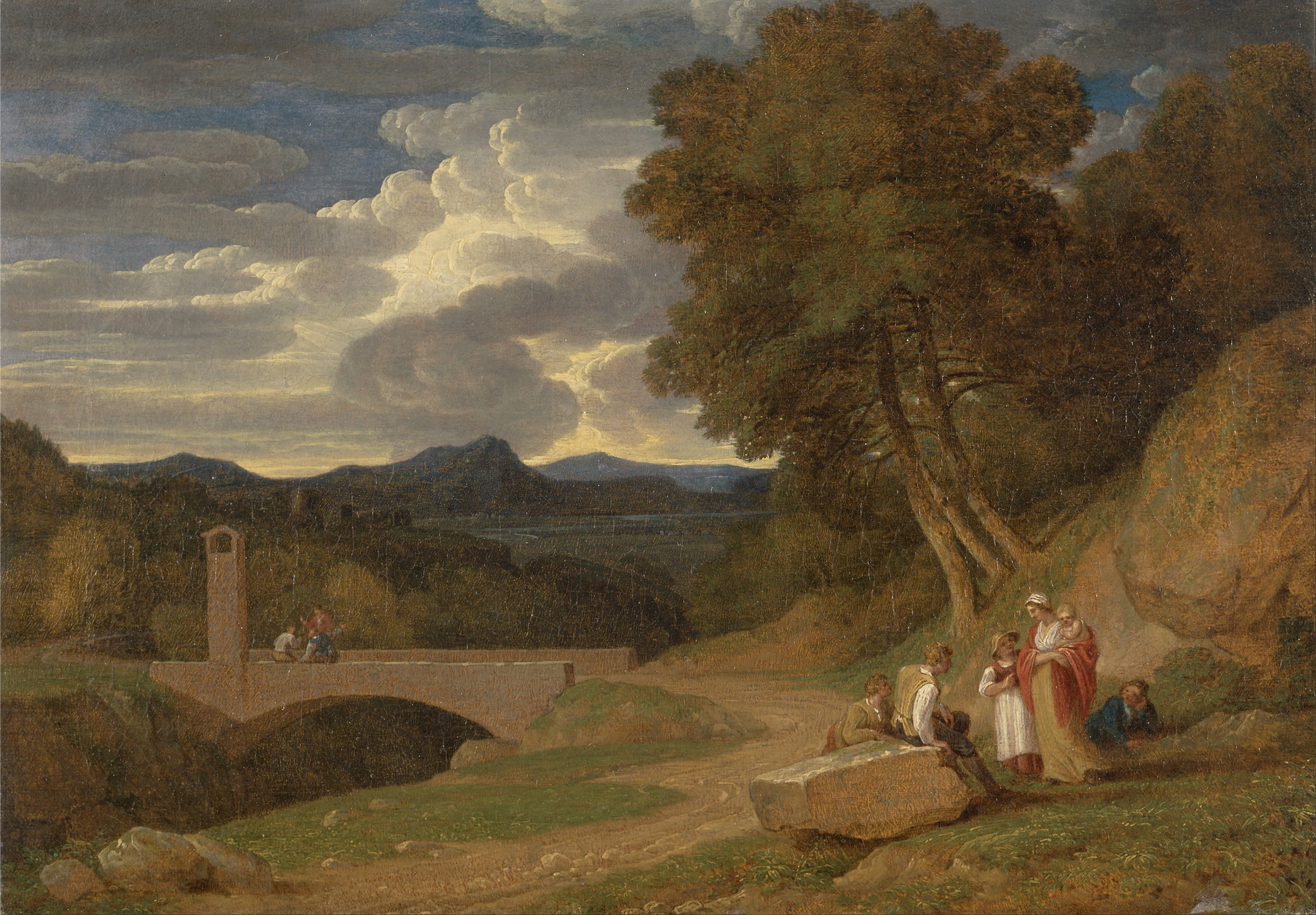
An Italianate Landscape, oil, 1800

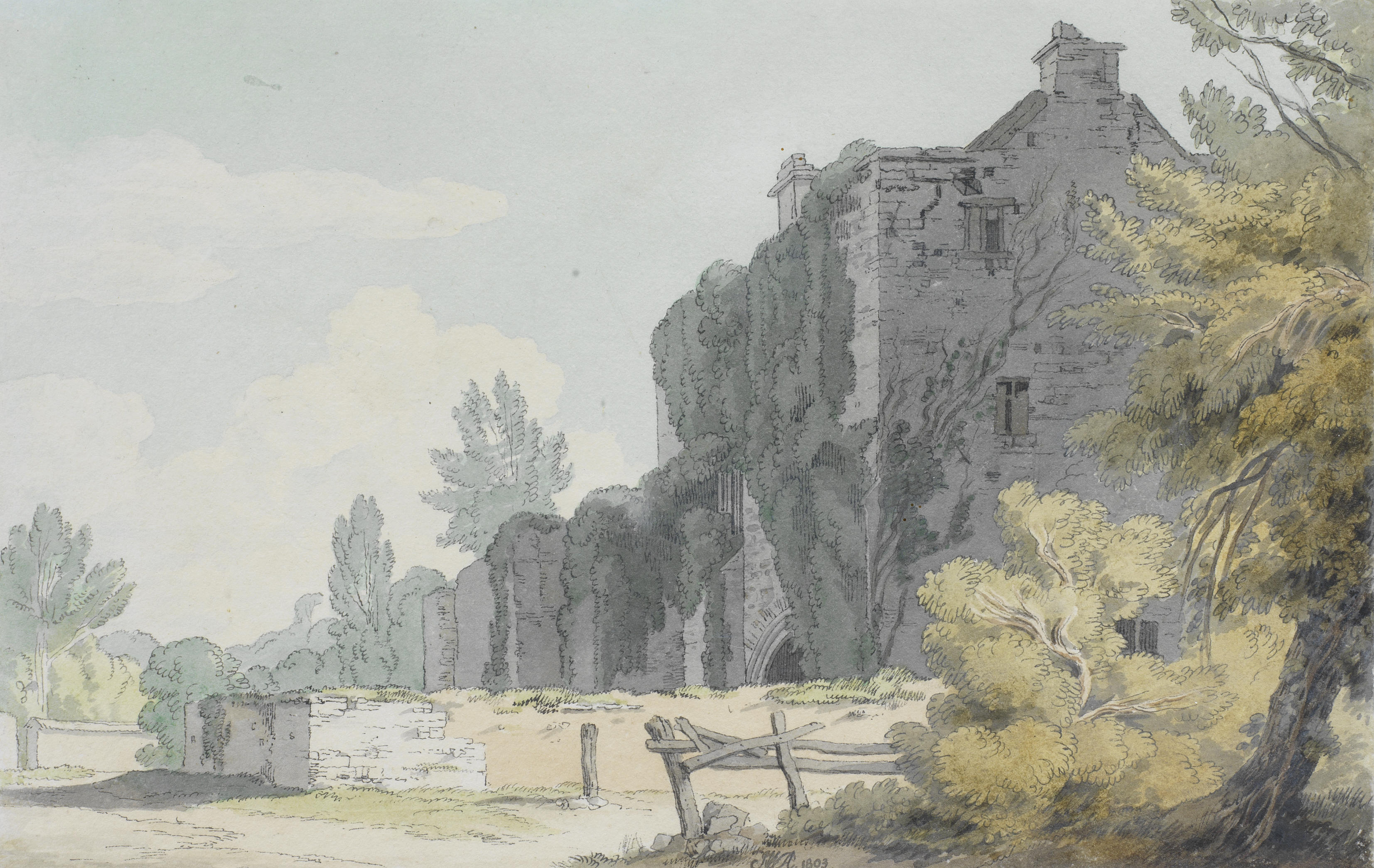
Bickleigh Court in Mid Devon, watercolor, 1803
