= Bickleigh, Mid Devon =

Village in Mid Devon, England

Coordinates: 50°51.255′N 3°30.323′W

Bickleigh
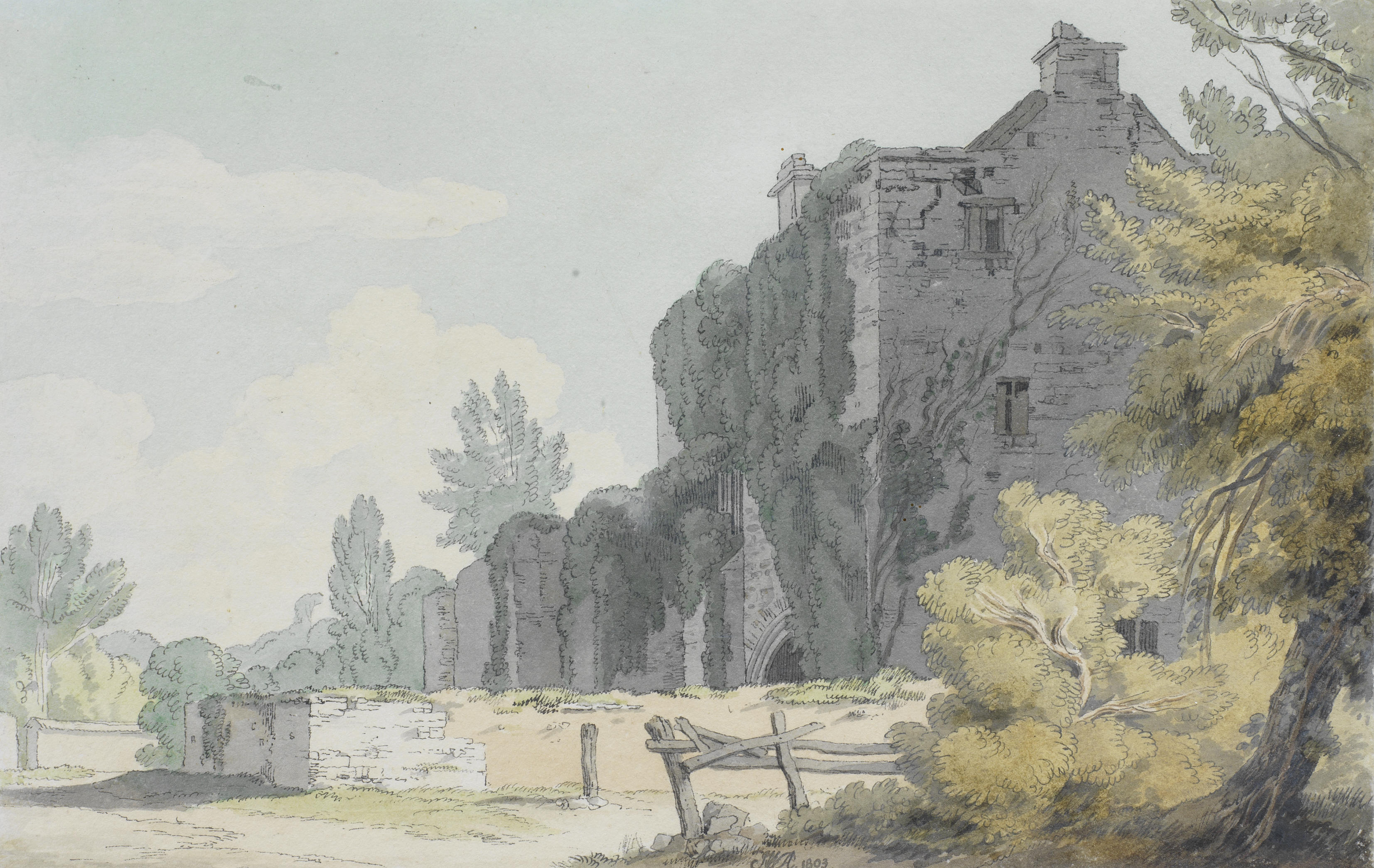
- Bickleigh Court by John White Abbott, 1803

- Location within Devon
- Population: 339 (2021 census)
- Civil parish: Bickleigh
- District: Mid Devon
- Shire county: Devon
- Region: South West
- Country: England
- Sovereign state: United Kingdom
- Post town: TIVERTON
- Postcode district: EX16
- Police: Devon and Cornwall
- Fire: Devon and Somerset
- Ambulance: South Western
- UK Parliament: Central Devon

Bickleigh is a village and civil parish in the Mid Devon district of Devon, England, about four miles south of Tiverton. The 2021 census recorded a population of 339.

The village lies in the valley of the River Exe; Bickleigh Bridge is a stone bridge that takes the A396 road across the river. The present bridge was constructed in the early 17th century and is grade II listed.

Bickleigh, as Bicanleag, is recorded as the location of a charter issued in 904 during the reign of King Edward the Elder. The village is mentioned in the Domesday Book as Bichelei, meaning "Bicca's meadow". It is in the former hundred of Hayridge.

Bickleigh Castle, the manor house formerly known as Bickleigh Court, has a Norman chapel and baptismal font. The gatehouse is a grade I listed building.

== St Mary's Church ==
Bickleigh's church, dedicated to the Virgin Mary, is a medieval church predominantly built in the 14th century, although it still contains a 12th-century south doorway and font. The subsequent restoration in 1843 detracted from its original form. Its tower houses six bells.

The church's history is closely bound with that of the Carew family, lords of the manor, and the church is noted for its Carew family monuments that date from the 16th and 17th centuries. The family's association continued until the manor's sale in 1922.

The most notable member of the family was Bampfylde Moore Carew (1690–1758), the son of Theodore Carew, Bickleigh's rector. According to his own account, after a number of adventures, Carew became a gipsy and was subsequently elected their king. He was transported to Maryland but escaped back to Britain and joined Bonnie Prince Charlie's army on its 1745 march to Derby, before returning to Bickleigh until his death. He is buried in the graveyard.

The church is home to carved bench ends depicting scenes of medieval life. Major John Gabriel Stedman, author of A History of Surinam, d. 1797, was buried here in an unmarked grave near the vestry door.

== Attractions ==
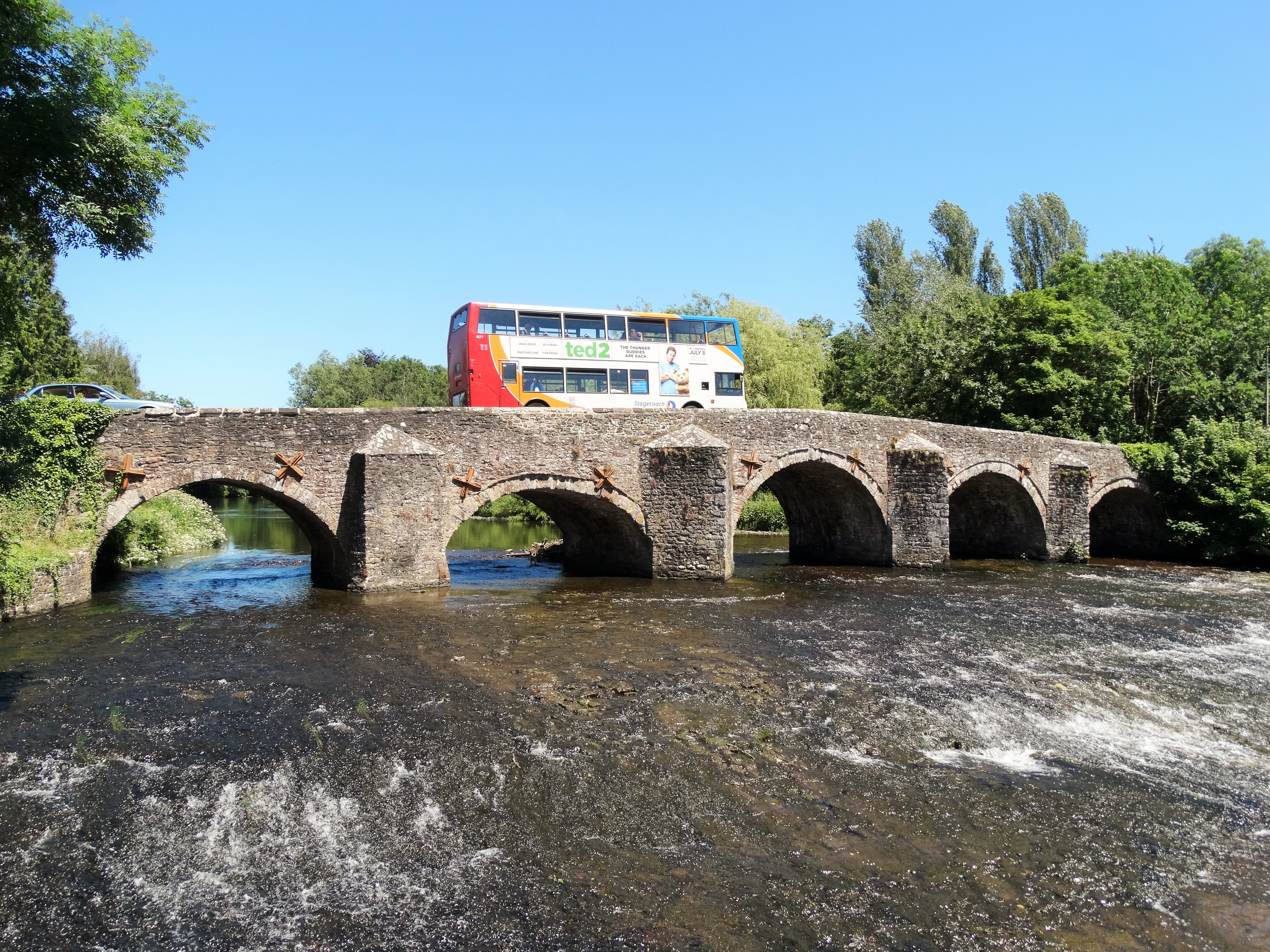
The south side of the spans of Bickleigh Bridge, with weir below

The Devon Railway Centre occupies the site of the former Cadeleigh railway station, which was actually adjacent to Bickleigh. The Exe Valley Railway line, which ran through Bickleigh, opened in 1884 and closed in 1963.

On the northwest bank of the River Exe, and by Bickleigh Bridge, is a large inn called The Fisherman's Cot. To the southeast of the bridge, and situated between the former railway station and the village, is Bickleigh Mill, which is a historic attraction with a restaurant and gift shops.

Farmer Nick Lees and his family have constructed several maize mazes in a field near the village. The subjects included Elizabeth II's Golden Jubilee, the 200th anniversary of the Battle of Trafalgar, the bicentenary of the birth of Isambard Kingdom Brunel and the 100th anniversary of the Scouting movement.

Just to the north of Bickleigh is one of the biggest vineyards in the South-West of England, Yearlstone, which has a state-of-the-art winery, wine bar and cafe. Yearlstone is now 3.5 hectares and hosts Devon Wine Week in the last week of May each year, a celebration of local food culture.

== Popular culture ==
A persistent myth among the residents of the area is that the village's bridge over the Exe inspired Paul Simon to write Bridge Over Troubled Water; Simon is known to have stayed in the village in the mid-sixties. Although Art Garfunkel denied the rumour in a 2003 interview, stating that Simon had taken the phrase from a Baptist hymn, it is entirely possible that Simon intended more than one allusion.
