= Bickleigh Castle =

Manor house in Devon, England

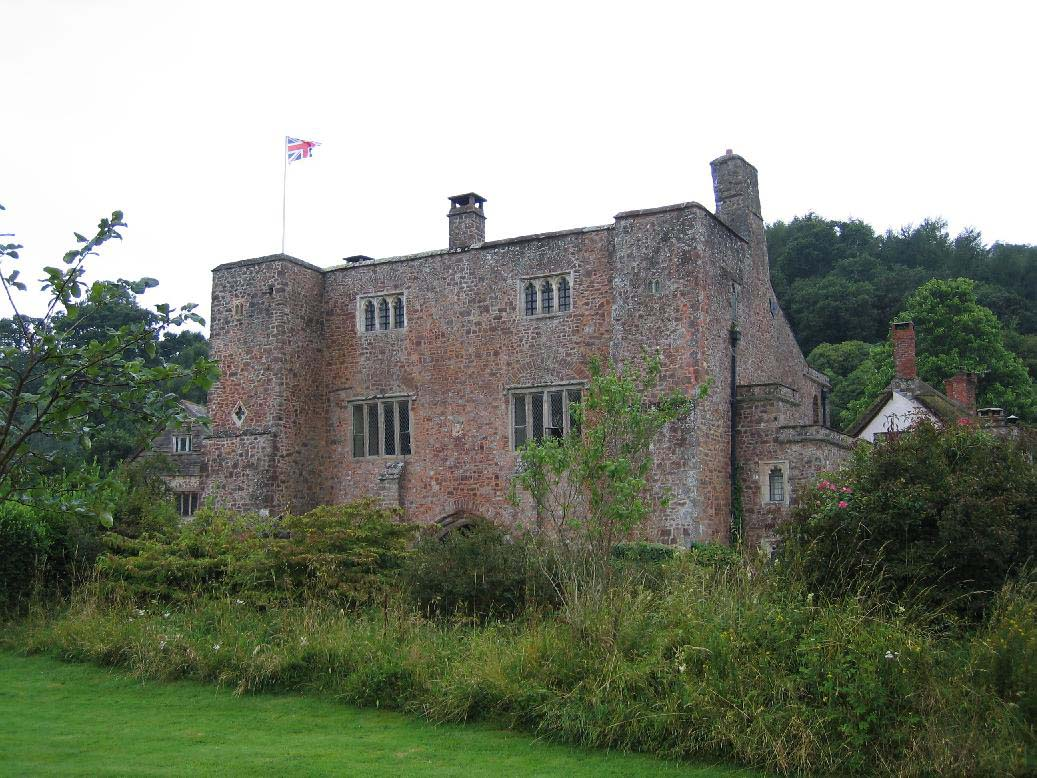
- Front of the Gatehouse

- Location within Devon
- 50°51′05″N 3°30′45″W
- Location: Bickleigh in Devon, England

Listed Building – Grade I
- Official name: Bickleigh Castle Gatehouse
- Designated: 28 August 1987
- Reference no.: 1325638

Listed Building – Grade II*
- Official name: Bickleigh Castle chapel - including walls to enclosure to south and west
- Designated: 28 August 1987
- Reference no.: 1325639

Listed Building – Grade II*
- Official name: Old Court
- Designated: 24 October 1951
- Reference no.: 1106959

Listed Building – Grade II
- Official name: Bickleigh Castle, north range
- Designated: 28 August 1987
- Reference no.: 1170452

Bickleigh Castle is a fortified manor house that stands on the banks of the River Exe at Bickleigh in Devon, England. Once considerably larger, Bickleigh now comprises a group of buildings from various periods which together formed a water castle.

It has also historically been known as Bickleigh Court. The main building was destroyed during the English Civil War, however other buildings survived, mostly arranged around a central courtyard. In the present day, the castle serves principally as a wedding venue, though at times is open to the public by appointment.

== History ==
A Norman motte castle of the late 11th or early 12th century was dismantled in the mid 12th century. During this time a small stone chapel was built in the bailey. In the 15th century the Courtenay family built a mansion on the site and incorporated some of the earlier buildings. The Courtenay and Carew families then lived there until the English Civil War, and the Carews owned the Estate until 1924.

During the English Civil War Charles I's queen, Henrietta Maria stayed in the castle as a guest of Sir Henry & Lady Dorothy Carew in 1644, on her way to Exeter. Shortly after her visit she gave birth to Princess Henrietta Anne Stuart, who later married Le Duc d'Orléans, the bisexual brother of King Louis XIV of France; there is a plaque commemorating the birth of the Princess in Exeter, which is now displayed in the Princesshay Shopping Centre. The Queen then exiled herself in July 1644 from Falmouth, and did not return until the 1660s. Subsequently, at the end of 1645, Fairfax's Parliamentarian troops attacked the castle, after "slighting" neighbouring Tiverton Castle; they had laid siege from Cadbury. The bulk of the castellated structure was then demolished by Parliamentarian troops. The "slighting" of Bickleigh was a response to the Royalist sympathies of the Carew family and its use as a stronghold during the conflict with the main manor house and inner keep being destroyed.

Following the Stuart Restoration, a typical Devon farmhouse of cob and thatch was added.

The buildings subsequently fell into disrepair, and became a farm store and cottage until they were restored early in the 20th century. The Norman chapel and a 12th-century gatehouse still exist, as does the 15th-century Courthouse and parts of the original Norman curtain wall. On a small hill behind the castle, encased amongst rhododendrons, are the remains of the Anglo-Saxon 'motte' (watchtower). The Fisherman's Cot was constructed in 1933.

== Buildings ==
The west range no longer survives. A building now known as the "Old Court" is south of the courtyard. Along with the North range and gatehouse most of the buildings were arranged around a central courtyard. The chapel is east of the rest of the buildings close to the River Exe. Moat Cottage is north of the other buildings.

=== Gatehouse ===
The gatehouse dates from the early 12th century and is a Grade I listed building. It is a three-storey single-depth plan stone structure with an asbestos slate roof surmounted by turrets. A central carriage archway leads into a courtyard. The building was substantially altered in the 15th century by the Courtenay family, and restored in the 1920s and 1930s during the ownerships of Francis Harper and Lt Col Jasper Henson. One turret collapsed on 30 December 2023.

=== Chapel ===
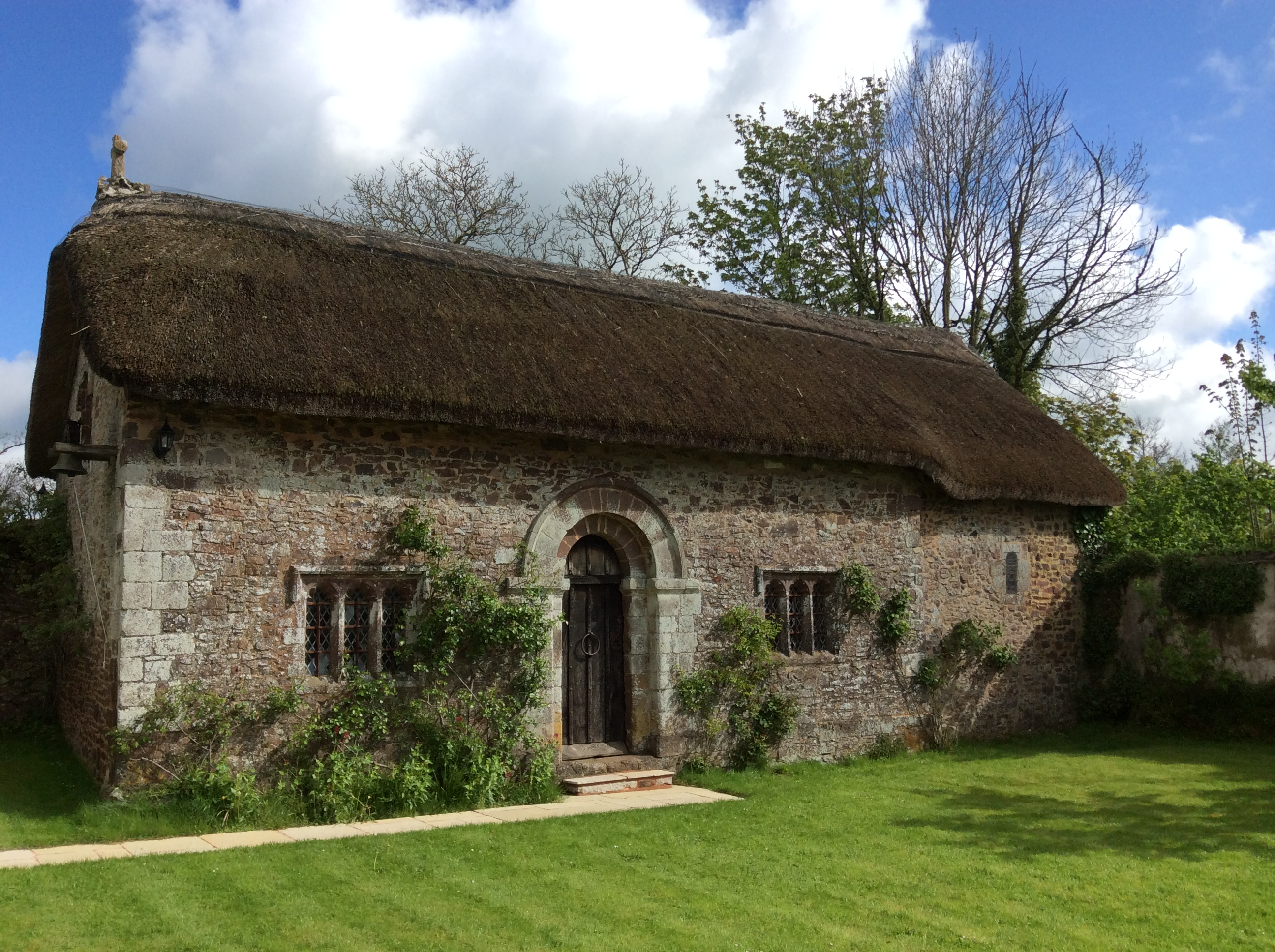
The chapel at Bickleigh Castle

The Sanctuary of the chapel pre-dates the Norman additions and alterations. The first documentary evidence of this building is circa AD600 probably before the Anglo-Saxons arrived circa AD 660, with further documentary reference to it being a chapel circa AD800s. The Sanctuary is the oldest part no doubt altered during that time. There is archaeological evidence of a wall at the west end of the Sanctuary with an arch, dividing it from the then nave. This was demolished when the nave was enlarged and replaced with a wooden Rood Screen. The current "wagon roof" dating from the 15th century. It is often cited as the oldest complete building in Devon. It was substantially renovated in the early 20th century. The rood screen was lost during the 19th century when the chapel was used to house cattle. The chapel currently (2017) contains a recently restored Estey organ dating from 1884.

=== Old Court ===
The Old Court is south of the range around the courtyard. It was built in the mid-15th century as a magistrates' court for Thomas, the 6th Earl of Devon, who was executed after the Battle of Towton in 1461; however, it has been revised and added to many times and part of the structure may have been demolished. It may have formed a hall house covered by a five arch braced jointed truss cruck roof. After the English Civil War, when the Castle was severely damaged, it became a residence, and may well have had some of the alterations made at that time. It is believed an underground passage connects the Old Court to the Keep Gatehouse at a point in the Keep Gatehouse where a room has been bricked up.

=== North Range ===
The North Range was built in the latter half of the 17th century and served as a farmhouse, housing staff for the owner, Sir Henry Carew, Kt. It is a two-storey building with a thatched roof. In the left end room is a 16th-century overmantel (c.1550) carved with scenes relating to the Reformation and specifically the trial and execution of Henry Courtenay, Marquis of Exeter & Earl of Devon, Sir Nicholas Carew, and Henry Pole at the Tower of London in January 1539 following the alleged 'Exeter Conspiracy'; in the carving is a stylised depiction of the City of Exeter and the Inner Keep of Bickleigh Castle. King Henry VIII is also depicted. A part of the carving may also relate to the role of the Carew family in putting down the Prayer Book Rebellion of 1549. The building was restored in the 1930s. The carving was originally in the part of the Castle demolished by the Parliamentarian Forces in the Civil War; for safe-keeping, it was stored in the vaults of Exeter Cathedral until the 1930s, when it was returned to the owner, Lt Col Jasper Henson, after a chance conversation with William Cecil, Bishop of Exeter, and eventually installed in its current position.

=== Moat Cottage ===
Moat Cottage which stands to the north of the other buildings was constructed in the late 16th century. It is a stone building with a thatched roof.

=== Stable block ===
The thatched former stable block was rebuilt in the 19th century on the site of an earlier building. It is surmounted by a turret clock, and has now been converted into accommodation and reception rooms.

== Grounds ==
It is set in 60 acres (24 ha) of grounds of which 5 acres (2.0 ha) are landscaped. The outer wall, gardens and fish ponds in front of the Keep Gatehouse were landscaped during the ownership of Sir Thomas Carew, Bt, in the 18th century. The ponds were created from the remnants of the Norman moat. The garden walls, gate piers and gates are also designated as listed buildings.

== Current use ==
The Castle was open to the public from 1970 to 1990 and was visited by 20,000 people each year. The Castle is currently open to public visitors by prior appointment; guided tours last approximately one hour.

The Castle and surrounding buildings are now used principally to host weddings, and also house parties, events and bed & breakfast.
