= Stoke Hill =

Hill in Devon, England

Coordinates: 50.7478°N 3.5269°W

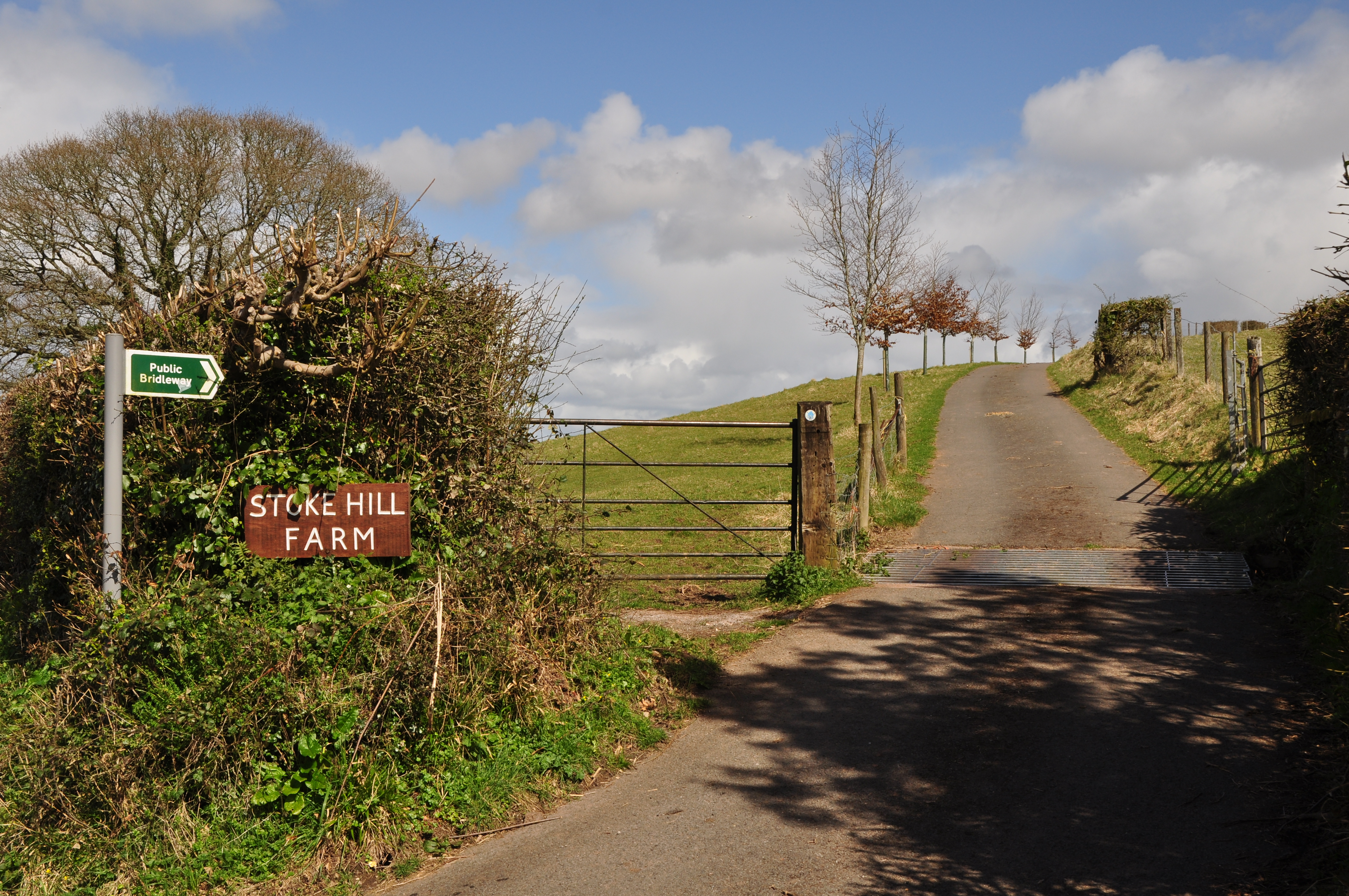
Farm track on Stoke Hill

Stoke Hill is a large hill rising to the north of Exeter in Devon, England. It is significant as the site of both an Iron Age hill fort and a later Roman signal station.

The hill fort is situated slightly below and northeast of the Roman signal station, putting it in a better position to have sight of a number of other hill forts simultaneously. It is at an elevation of approximately 145 metres (476 ft) above sea level. The signal station is at the highest point of the hill, 159 metres (522 ft) above sea level.

Stoke Hill is also the name of a northern suburb of Exeter, at grid reference SX934943.
