= Walter R. Skinner =

Walter R. (Robert) Skinner (1851–1924) was a London-based publisher, who in collaboration with the Financial Times published the Mining Manual (1887–1913) and later the combined Mining Manual and Mining Year Book (1913–27), which contained extensive details of mining operations around the world. He also published the Oil and Petroleum Manual (1910 onwards), as well as the weekly investment guide The Capitalist.

Later his name would be used in title of a series of subsequent publications in the 1970s. The Financial Times would continue to use Skinner's name in publication details in Mining Year Book until 1971.

== Publications ==
- The Capitalist (1885 + )
- Mining Manual (1887 + )
- The South African Mining Manual for 1888
- The Joint Stock Registration Manual: containing particulars of all Companies registered. July, 1890.
- The West African Mining Manual for 1909 [etc.]
- Mining Manual and Mining Year Book (1913 + )
- Oil and Petroleum Manual (1910)
- The Oil, Petroleum and Bitumen Manual (Oil and Petroleum Manual) and kindred companies, for 1910(-27).

The titles Oil & Petroleum Year Book and Mining Year Book were acquired by FT Publications in late 1971.
