= Exeter underground passages =

Scheduled monument in Exeter, United Kingdom

Coordinates: 50.7252°N 3.5277°W

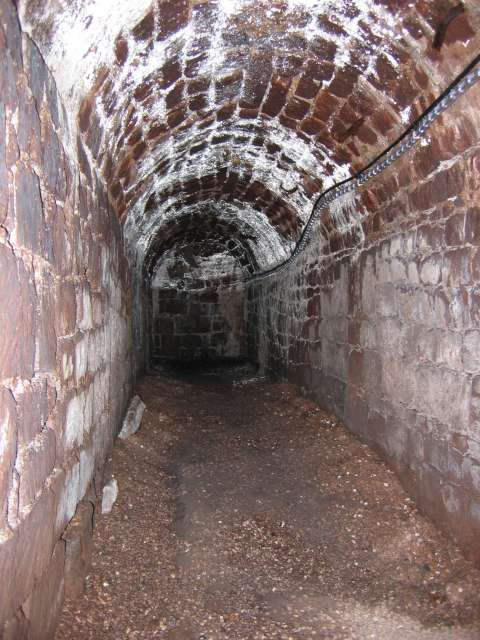
One of the underground passeges beneath Exeter

The Exeter underground passages were part of the English city of Exeter's medieval water supply system, and are a scheduled monument in the city. The earliest of the tunnels dates from the 13th century. Guided tours of the tunnels are held throughout the year.
