= Walter Skinner (cricketer) =

English cricketer

Personal information
- Full name: Walter Ronald Skinner
- Born: 26 June 1913; Staines, Middx, England
- Died: 15 November 1994 (aged 81); Worthing, Sussex, England
- Batting: Unknown
- Relatives: Married Joan (nee Smith) 1947;deceased Worthing 18.12.2023; son Walter John, born 1949;in film industry, wed to Asja; step grandson Lloyd Lane, photographer

Career statistics
| Competition | First-class |
|---|---|
| Matches | 1 |
| Runs scored | 17 |
| Batting average | 17.00 |
| 100s/50s | –/– |
| Top score | 17 |
| Catches/stumpings | –/– |
- Source: Cricinfo, 12 June 2019

Walter Ronald Skinner (26 June 1913 – 15 November 1994) was an English first-class cricketer.

Skinner was chosen to tour Argentina with Sir T. E. W. Brinckman's XI in 1937/38, playing one first-class match during the tour against Argentina at Buenos Aires. Batting once in the match, he scored 17 runs in the teams first-innings, before being dismissed by Cyril Ayling. He later served in the Second World War, holding the rank of second lieutenant with the Reconnaissance Corps in April 1941. He was given the war substantive rank of lieutenant in April 1943. He left the army following the war and was granted the honorary rank of lieutenant in April 1946. He died at Worthing in November 1994.
