= Huntsham Castle =

Iron Age hill fort in Devon, England

Coordinates: 50.974°N 3.425°W

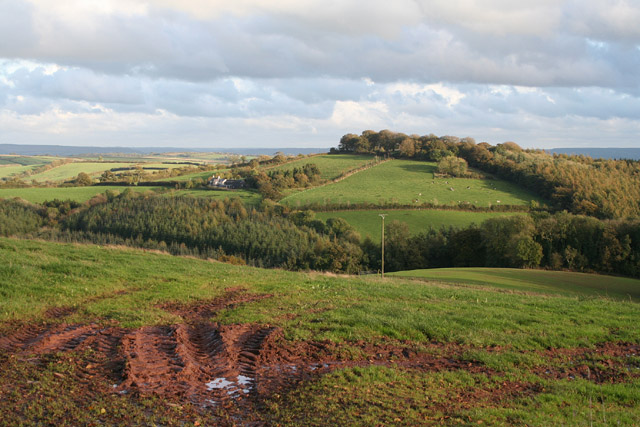
Huntsham Castle

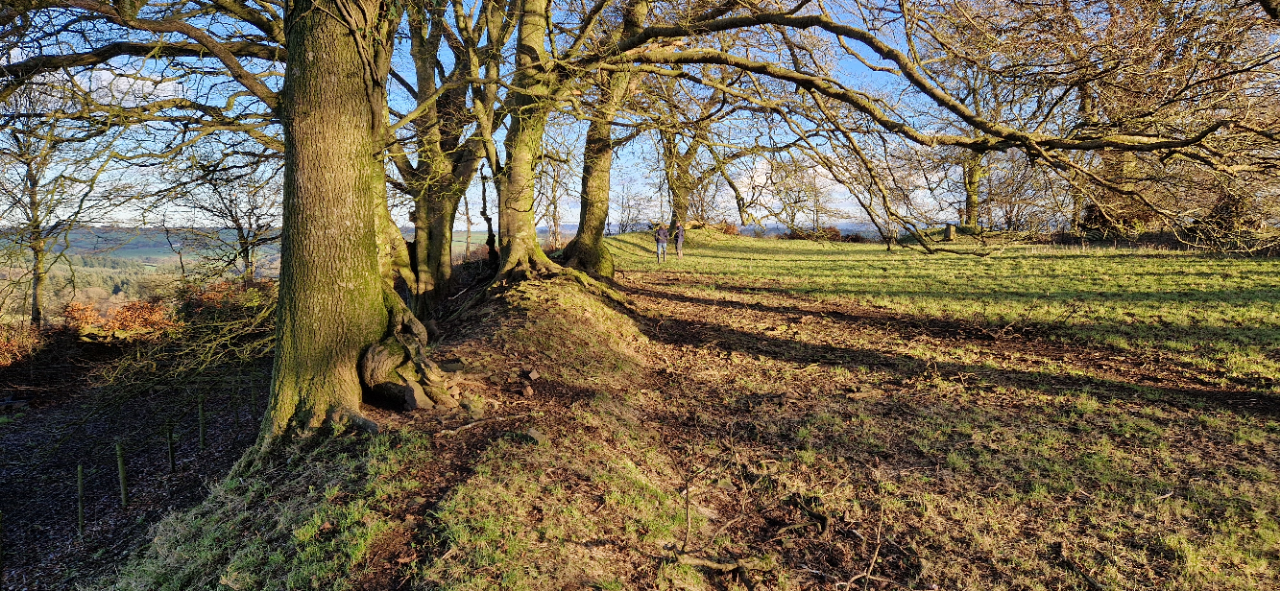
Huntsham Castle north rampart

Huntsham Castle, Devon, England is an Iron Age Hill fort enclosure near the village of Huntsham, it is located 260 m (850 ft) above sea level on the edge of the former Parish of Tiverton. The monument includes a slight univallate hillfort situated on a prominent hill overlooking the valleys of two separate tributaries to the River Lowman. The monument survives as a sub-circular enclosure, defining an area which slopes gently down to the south and measures approximately 150m in diameter. It is clearly demarcated on all sides by a rampart which varies in height from 1m up to 2.4m internally, being generally of greater height on the northern side of the enclosure. Externally this rampart is up to 2.9m high.

Surrounding the rampart is an outer ditch which measures up to 5.4m wide and 0.4m deep and this is visible on all sides of the monument, although it is predominantly preserved as a buried feature. On the north eastern side, the outer edge of this ditch is defined by a field boundary bank and the infilled ditch has been used in the past as a track. There is an inturned entrance on the north eastern side which measures 7m wide, and the inturned banks are up to 2.2m wide and 0.4m high. The enclosure is crossed by a parish boundary bank which measures up to 2m wide and 1.5m high, and has been partially cut at the north eastern corner by a quarry, approximately 20m long, 15m wide and up to 2.8m deep, which lies to the north of the entrance.

A further quarry lies to the south of the parish boundary bank, on the western side of the enclosure and measures 8.7 metres (29 ft) long, 5.3 metres (17 ft) wide and up to 1 metre (3.3 ft) deep. A third quarry lies to the north west and has partially cut into the ditch and rampart on this side; however much of this quarry lies just beyond the monument itself. A further entrance to the enclosure may lie on the western side, where the rampart is seen to kink slightly inwards.

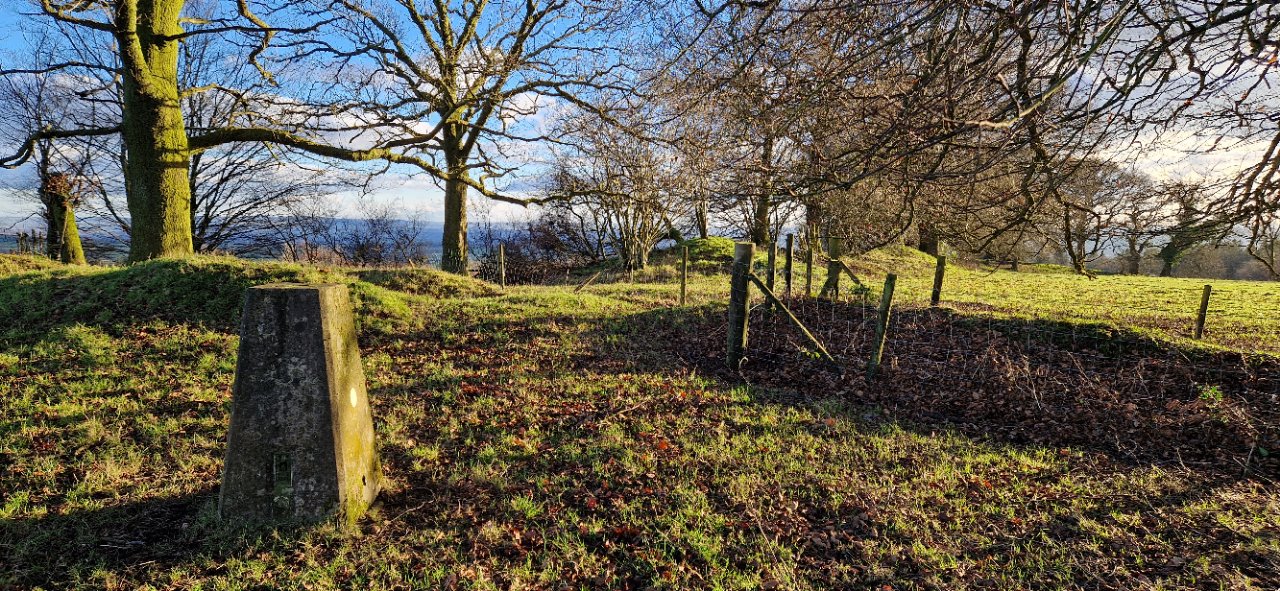
Huntsham Castle Trig Point, north-east corner

The stock proof fences around the rampart and ditch, the gates and gateposts which facilitate access, the Ordnance Survey triangulation point which is situated on the north eastern side of the enclosure just above the quarry, and the field boundary bank which defines the outer edge of the ditch in the north eastern corner are excluded from the scheduling, although the ground beneath all these features is included.
