= Kenley Players =

Equity summer stock theatre company

The Kenley Players was an Equity summer stock theatre company which presented hundreds of productions featuring Broadway, film, and television stars in Midwestern cities between 1940 and 1995. Variety called it the "largest network of theaters on the straw hat circuit." Founded by and operated for its entire lifespan by John Kenley, it is credited with laying the groundwork for Broadway touring companies.

The company's success was predicated on booking big-name stars for their box =office potential, casting them in familiar plays and musicals, and keeping prices low, thereby attracting large crowds. In its heyday, Kenley Players productions drew crowds of 5,000 in Dayton, Akron, Columbus, Flint, Michigan, and Warren, Ohio. Kenley "pioneered the notion of putting TV stars in summer stock." In a 1950 interview Kenley told The Washington Post, "I only charge $1.50 top...I'd rather have full houses every night than be stuck with a batch of empty seats."

Headliners included Tallulah Bankhead, Cyd Charisse, Rosemary Clooney, Olivia de Havilland, Veronica Lake, Gypsy Rose Lee, Arthur Godfrey, Rudy Vallée, Tommy Tune, Burt Reynolds, George Maharis, Ethel Merman, Mae West, Billy Crystal, William Shatner, Betty White, Florence Henderson, Mickey Rooney, Roddy McDowall, Marlene Dietrich, Jayne Mansfield, Rock Hudson, and Gloria Swanson. Those who appeared in more than five productions included Edie Adams, Ed Ames, Vivian Blaine, Mitzi Gaynor, Vincent Price, Genevieve, Robert Goulet, Lois Hunt, Van Johnson, Carol Lawrence, Paul Lynde, Gordon MacRae, Ann Miller, Karen Morrow, John Raitt, Martha Raye, Alexis Smith, Betty White, Barry Williams, and Earl Wrightson. In 1972, 1973, and 1975, Karen Valentine appeared in Columbus, Ohio. In 1978, Sue Ane Langdon appeared in Chicago in Columbus, Ohio.

Backstage called the Kenley Players "a legendary summer stock circuit." Playbill called it "for decades, a renowned midwestern summer stock outfit." During the period The Phil Donahue Show was broadcast from Dayton, celebrities appearing in Kenley productions appeared regularly, giving Kenley national publicity.

== Production history ==
=== 1940 ===
- The Barker - starring Ann Corio
- Command of Love - starring Ramon Novarro
- The Hottentot - starring Arthur Treacher
- No More Ladies - starring Lila Lee and Pert Kelton
- On the Spot - starring Anna May Wong
- The Poor Nut - starring Buddy Ebsen
- Private Lives - starring Ruth Chatterton
- See My Lawyer - starring Teddy Hart
- Tit for Tat - starring Pert Kelton and Lila Lee
- Up Pops the Devil - starring Fifi D'Orsay
- Worth A Million - starring Charley Chase
- Young Sinners - starring Leon Janney

=== 1947 ===
- Ah, Wilderness! - starring Frank McHugh
- Arsenic and Old Lace - starring Bela Lugosi
- Biography - starring Vera Vague
- Caprice - starring Ruth Chatterton
- Dream Play - starring Jean Parker
- A Goose for the Gander - starring Gloria Swanson
- Kiss and Tell - starring Peggy Ann Garner
- Ladies in Retirement - starring Fritzi Scheff
- The Little Foxes - starring Ruth Chatterton
- The Male Animal - starring Buddy Ebsen
- The Petrified Forest - starring Conrad Nagel
- The Philadelphia Story - starring Diana Barrymore
- Sailor Beware - starring Ann Corio
- A Slight Case of Murder - starring James Dunn
- Springtime for Henry - starring Edward Everett Horton
- Three's A Family - no featured performers
- Tobacco Road - no featured performers

=== 1948 ===
- Fatal Weakness - starring Glenda Farrell
- Free Hand - starring Larry Parks
- Good News - starring Dean Havers (first musical)
- John Loves Mary - starring Guy Madison
- Kind Lady - starring Sylvia Sidney
- Kiss and Tell - starring James Dobson
- The Last of Mrs. Cheyney - starring Kay Francis
- Laura - starring Signe Hasso
- Made in Heaven - starring Richard Arlen
- Strictly Dishonorable - starring Edmund Lowe
- Ten Little Indians - starring Beverly Roberts and Beverly Bayne
- Twentieth Century - starring Mischa Auer and Haila Stoddard
- The Voice of the Turtle - starring Virginia Gilmore
- Years Ago - starring Nancy Carroll

=== 1949 ===
- Accent on Youth - starring Paul Lukas
- Anna Lucasta - starring Lizabeth Scott
- The Barretts of Wimpole Street - starring Susan Peters
- The Bat - starring Zasu Pitts
- Burlesque - starring Bert Lahr
- Dressed to Kill - starring Chester Morris
- Happy Birthday - starring Joan Blondell
- Her Cardboard Lover - starring Tom Drake
- Kiss and Tell - starring Peggy Ann Garner
- Let Us Be Gay - starring Kay Francis
- Light Up The Sky - starring Diana Barrymore
- My Sister Eileen - starring Billy Gilbert
- Petticoat Fever - starring Sonny Tufts
- The Philadelphia Story - starring Sarah Churchill
- Yes, My Darling Daughter - starring Ann Harding

=== 1950 ===
- Angel Street - starring Laraine Day and Ernest Cossart
- Another Language - starring Martha Scott
- Apple of His Eye - starring Edward Arnold
- Born Yesterday - starring Shelley Winters
- Candle-Light - starring Jean Parker
- The Chocolate Soldier - starring Ernest McChesney
- Finian's Rainbow - starring Jerry Wayne
- For Love or Money - starring John Loder
- Goodbye, My Fancy - starring Sylvia Sidney
- Harvey - starring Bert Wheeler
- Over 21 - starring Eve Arden
- The Poor Nut - starring Lon McAllister
- Post Road - starring Zasu Pitts
- The Primrose Path - starring Ann Corio
- The Spider - starring Victor Jory
- Tobacco Road - starring John Carradine

=== 1951 ===
- Brigadoon - no featured performers
- Candida - starring Olivia de Havilland
- The Curtain Rises - starring Veronica Lake
- Die Fledermaus - starring Ernest McChesney
- Glad Tidings - starring Melvyn Douglas and Signe Hasso
- Golden Boy - starring John Garfield
- Mirror, Mirror - starring Kay Francis
- Pal Joey - starring Carol Bruce and Bob Fosse
- Personal Appearance - starring Georgia Sothern
- Rain - starring Lawrence Tibbett
- Separate Rooms - starring Barbara Britton
- Skylark - starring Constance Bennett
- Springtime for Henry - starring Edward Everett Horton
- A Streetcar Named Desire - starring Richard Kiley
- Tonight or Never - starring Ilona Massey

=== 1952 ===
- Anonymous Lover - starring Betty Garrett and Larry Parks
- Charley's Aunt - starring Francis Ballard
- Come Back, Little Sheba - starring Joan Blondell
- Come On Up (Ring Twice) - starring Mae West
- Gramercy Ghost - starring Angela Lansbury
- The Happy Time - starring Denise Darcel
- Kiss Me, Kate - starring Arthur Maxwell and Juliana Larson
- The Little Foxes - starring Ruth Chatterton
- Maid in the Ozarks - starring Gina and Burman Bodel
- A Night at Madame Tussaud's - starring Peter Lorre and Miriam Hopkins
- On Your Toes - starring Katharine Sergava, Bill Callahan and Yvonne Adair
- Private Lives - starring Alexis Smith and Victor Jory
- Remains to Be Seen - starring Veronica Lake and Jackie Cooper
- The Second Man - starring Franchot Tone and Betsy von Furstenberg
- Theatre - starring Kay Francis
- A Tree Grows in Brooklyn - starring Lanny Ross
- White Cargo - starring Rose La Rose

=== 1953 ===
- Affairs of State - starring June Havoc
- Anna Lucasta - starring Sherry Britton
- Annie Get Your Gun - starring Sara Dillon
- Bell, Book and Candle - starring Alexis Smith and Victor Jory
- Call Me Madam - starring Patrice Wilkes and Jimmy Kirkwood
- Gentlemen Prefer Blondes - starring Rusti Salmon
- I Am a Camera - starring Evelyn Keyes
- Loco - starring Dagmar and Arthur Treacher
- Mister Roberts - no featured performers
- The Moon Is Blue - starring Jean Jory
- The Postman Always Rings Twice - starring Barbara Payton and Tom Neal
- The Respectful Prostitute - starring Amelia Corley
- Sassy Little Lassie - starring Chaz Chase

=== 1955 ===
- The Caine Mutiny Court-Martial - starring Chester Morris
- Finian's Rainbow - starring Susan Reed
- For Love or Money - starring Marie Wilson
- Guys and Dolls - no featured performers
- Member of the Wedding - starring Ethel Waters
- The Moon Is Blue - starring Donald Woods
- No Time For Comedy - starring Sarah Churchill
- Picnic - starring Gloria Vanderbilt and Jack Warden
- The Shanghai Gesture - starring Claire Luce
- A Streetcar Named Desire - starring Diana Barrymore
- Tobacco Road - starring Larry Barton
- White Cargo - starring Julie Gibson
- You Can't Take It With You - starring Charles Colburn

=== 1957 ===
- Annie Get Your Gun - starring Vaughan Monroe and Constance Moore
- Anniversary Waltz - starring Anne Jeffreys and Robert Sterling
- Brigadoon - starring Susanna Foster and Virginia De Luce
- Bus Stop - starring Tempest Storm
- Can-Can - starring Dolores Gray
- Guys and Dolls - starring Maxie Rosenbloom
- The Moon Is Blue - starring Donald Woods
- Natural Urge - starring Dorothy Lamour and Robert Alda
- Petticoat Fever - starring Red Buttons
- The Primrose Path - starring Lillian Roth
- Show Boat - no featured performers
- South Pacific - starring Juanita Hall
- A Streetcar Named Desire - starring Nina Foch
- Will Success Spoil Rock Hunter? starring Marie Wilson

=== 1958 ===
- Anything Goes - starring Martha Raye and Keefe Brasselle
- Can-Can - starring Genevieve
- Cat on a Hot Tin Roof - starring Diana Barrymore
- Damn Yankees - starring Bert Wheeler
- Fallen Angels - starring Hermione Gingold and Carol Bruce
- House on the Rocks - starring Tallulah Bankhead
- Kiss Me, Kate - starring Patricia Morison
- The Moon Is Blue - starring Peggy King and Keefe Brasselle
- No Time for Sergeants - starring James Holden
- Show Boat - starring Allan Jones and Bert Wheeler
- Tonight at 8.30 starring Faye Emerson
- Wonderful Town - starring Kaye Ballard

=== 1959 ===
- Bells Are Ringing - starring Anne Jeffreys
- Bitter Sweet - starring Jeanette MacDonald
- Born Yesterday - starring Peggy Cass
- Dream Play - starring Dorothy Collins
- Guys and Dolls - starring Robert Horton
- The King and I - starring Betty White
- Li'l Abner - starring Stephen Douglass
- Mister Roberts - starring Howard Keel
- Once More, With Feeling - starring Dorothy Malone
- The Pajama Game - starring Debra Paget
- The Seven Year Itch - starring Dick Shawn
- The Tunnel of Love - starring Virginia Mayo and Michael O'Shea

=== 1960 ===
- Annie Get Your Gun - starring Ginger Rogers
- Anniversary Waltz - starring Hugh Downs
- Auntie Mame - starring Gypsy Rose Lee
- Can-Can - starring Genevieve
- Carousel - starring Betty Johnson and Robert Goulet
- John Loves Mary - starring James Garner
- Kismet - starring Jose Duval
- Meet Me in St. Louis - starring Jill Corey
- The Merry Widow - starring Edie Adams
- Redhead - starring Gordon and Sheila MacRae
- Rose-Marie - starring Anna Maria Alberghetti
- Silk Stockings - starring Genevieve
- South Pacific - starring Jeanne Bal and Alan Gerrard
- Susan and God - starring Joan Fontaine

=== 1961 ===
- Auntie Mame - starring Gypsy Rose Lee
- Bells Are Ringing - starring Gordon and Sheila MacRae
- Blithe Spirit - starring Zsa Zsa Gabor
- Destry Rides Again - starring Hugh O' Brian
- Gentlemen Prefer Blondes - starring Betsy Palmer
- The King and I - starring Patricia Morison
- Naighty Marietta - starring Kathryn Grayson
- Oklahoma! - starring John Raitt
- Pal Joey - starring Andy Williams and Julie Wilson
- Sextette - starring Mae West
- A Streetcar Named Desire - starring Vivian Blaine and John Ericson
- The Student Prince - starring Robert Rounseville
- Take Me Along - starring Jack Carson and Betty White
- Under the Yum Yum Tree - starring Hugh Downs
- West Side Story - starring Carla Alberghetti
- The World of Suzie Wong - starring Karl Fredericks

=== 1962 ===
- Brigadoon - starring Johnny Desmond
- Bye Bye Birdie - starring Andy Williams, Selma Diamond and Carmen Alvarez
- Carousel - starring John Raitt
- Father of the Bride - starring Art Linkletter
- Fiorello! - starring Bob Carroll
- Flower Drum Song - starring Ramon Novarro and Juanita Hall
- Girl Crazy - starring Mike Douglas
- Gypsy - starring Betty Hutton
- The Marriage-Go-Round - starring Ozzie and Harriet Nelson
- The Merry Widow - starring Patrice Munsel
- The Most Happy Fella - starring Jane Powell
- The Music Man - starring Van Johnson
- Oklahoma! - starring Robert Horton
- Picnic - starring Robert Horton
- Roman Candle - starring Arlene Dahl and Lee Patterson
- Say, Darling - starring Orson Bean, Don Cornell,k and Gretchen Wyler
- Wildcat - starring Martha Raye

=== 1963 ===
- Carnival! - starring Ann Blyth
- Come Blow Your Horn - starring Merv Griffin and William Bendix
- Fanny - starring Anna Maria Alberghetti
- Irma La Douce - starring Genevieve
- The Music Man - starring Van Johnson
- My Three Angels - starring Gardner McKay
- Oh, Men! Oh, Women! - starring Raymond Burr
- Rain - starring Edie Adams
- Show Boat - starring Howard Keel
- Song of Norway - starring Patricia Morison
- South Pacific - starring Dorothy Collins
- Sunday in New York - starring Kathryn Crosby
- The Tender Trap - starring Tab Hunter and Mary Ann Mobley
- The Unsinkable Molly Brown - starring Phyllis McGuire and Peter Palmer
- West Side Story - starring Bobby Rydell and Larry Kert
- Wildcat - starring Martha Raye
- The Wizard of Oz - starring Brenda Lee

=== 1964 ===
- Bachelor's Wife - starring Peggy Cass
- Bus Stop - starring Jayne Mansfield
- Camelot - starring Earl Wrightson and Lois Hunt
- Can-Can - starring Denise Darcel and Stuart Damon
- Critic's Choice - starring Allen Ludden and Betty White
- Damn Yankees - starring Bert Parks
- Guys and Dolls - starring Dan Dailey
- Little Me - starring Phyllis McGuire and Mickey Deems
- Love and Kisses - starring Hugh Downs
- My Fair Lady - starring Ray Milland
- The Sound of Music - starring Anita Bryant
- Take Her, She's Mine - starring Durward Kirby
- The Teahouse of the August Moon - starring Henry Morgan and Ty Hardin
- A Thousand Clowns - starring Van Johnson
- Tovarich - starring Jane Morgan and Tommy Kirk

=== 1965 ===
- Bell, Book and Candle - starring Allen Ludden and Betty White
- Carousel - starring Carol Lawrence and Stephen Douglass
- A Funny Thing Happened on the Way to the Forum - starring Dick Shawn
- Gigi - starring George Hamilton
- Kiss Me, Kate - starring Earl Wrightson and Lois Hunt
- Lady in the Dark - starring Betsy Palmer
- Mary, Mary - starring Craig Stevens and Alexis Smith
- Mister Roberts - starring Robert Stack
- The Music Man - starring Gig Young
- Nature's Way - starring Jayne Mansfield
- Never Too Late - starring Arthur Godfrey and Maureen O'Sullivan
- The Pajama Game - starring Jack Jones
- A Shot in the Dark - starring Eva Gabor and Carl Betz
- The Solid Gold Cadillac - starring Ann Sothern
- Wish You Were Here - starring James Darren and Morty Gunty

=== 1966 ===
- Any Wednesday - starring Connie Stevens
- Bells Are Ringing - starring Edie Adams and Don Stewart
- The Boy Friend - starring Juliet Prowse
- Charley's Aunt - starring Louis Nye
- Gentlemen Prefer Blondes - starring Carroll Baker, Bob Carroll and Marcia Rodd
- How to Succeed in Business Without Really Trying - starring Jerry Van Dyke and Billy De Wolfe
- Kismet - starring Gordon MacRae and Carla Alberghetti
- Oklahoma! - starring Robert Horton
- Oliver! - starring Walter Slezak
- Private Lives - starring Richard Chamberlain
- The Sound of Music - starring Shirley Jones
- South Pacific (musical) - starring Florence Henderson
- Who Was That Lady I Saw You With? - starring John Forsythe
- The Women - starring Marge Champion, Dagmar, Elaine Stritch, and Gloria Swanson

=== 1967 ===
- Barefoot in the Park - starring George Maharis, Virginia Graham, and Jessica Walter
- Bye Bye Birdie - starring Gene Barry and Totie Fields
- Do I Hear a Waltz? - starring Anita Bryant
- Finian's Rainbow - starring Barbara Eden
- Funny Girl - starring Shari Lewis
- Half a Sixpence - starring Noel Harrison
- Luv - starring Mickey Rooney, Dom DeLuise, and Joan Rivers
- The Odd Couple - starring Gig Young and Robert Q. Lewis
- On a Clear Day You Can See Forever - starring Shirley Jones
- The Philadelphia Story - starring Diana Barrymore
- Sweet Charity - starring Janis Paige
- West Side Story - starring Anna Maria Alberghetti

=== 1968 ===
- Call Me Madam - starring Ethel Merman
- Can-Can - starring Joey Heatherton
- The Fantasticks - starring John Gavin and Edward Everett Horton
- Generation - starring Robert Cummings
- Goodbye, Charlie - starring Martha Raye and Ron Harper
- The Great Sebastian - starring Van Johnson and Sheila MacRae
- Irma La Douce - starring Juliet Prowse
- The King and I - starring Ann Blyth
- The Man Who Came to Dinner - starring Jack Cassidy, Joan Caulfield, and Joan Bennett
- Pal Joey - starring Buddy Greco, Anne Jeffreys, and Dagmar
- The Student Prince - starring John Gary
- Take Me Along - starring Arthur Godfrey and Vivian Blaine
- Where's Charley? - starring Noel Harrison

=== 1969 ===
- Cactus Flower - starring Bob Crane and Abby Dalton
- Camelot - starring John Raitt
- Can-Can - starring Tony Martin and Cyd Charisse
- Golden Rainbow - starring Gordon MacRae
- Gypsy - starring Jo Anne Worley
- The Happy Time - starring Allan Jones and George Chakiris
- Hello, Dolly! - starring Betty Grable
- How Now, Dow Jones - starring Tony Randall
- I Do! I Do! - starring Carol Lawrence and Terence Monk
- The Impossible Years - starring Paul Lynde
- The King and I - starring Patrice Munsel
- Mame - starring Patrice Munsel
- My Fair Lady - starring Jane Powell
- The Show-Off - starring Dick Shawn
- The Unsinkable Molly Brown - starring Vikki Carr
- Walking Happy - starring Noel Harrison
- You Know I Can't Hear You When the Water's Running - starring Arte Johnson and Chester Morris

=== 1970 ===
- Blossom Time - starring Sally Ann Howes
- Cabaret - starring Joel Grey
- Dames at Sea - starring Mamie Van Doren
- Don't Drink the Water - starring Paul Lynde
- High Button Shoes - starring Soupy Sales and Jane Russell
- I Do! I Do! - starring Edie Adams and Jack Cassidy
- Mame - starring Ann Miller
- Man of La Mancha - starring Giorgio Tozzi and Marion Marlowe
- The Marriage-Go-Round - starring Louis Jourdan and Vivian Blaine
- My Daughter, Your Son - starring Vivian Vance, Dody Goodman, George S. Irving, and Bill McCutcheon
- Nobody Loves an Albatross - starring Gig Young
- Plain and Fancy - starring Peter Marshall and Dody Goodman
- Show Boat - starring Ann Blyth and Andy Devine
- There's a Girl in My Soup - starring Bill Bixby and Lesley Gore

=== 1971 ===
- Anything Goes - starring Frankie Avalon and Joe Flynn
- Catch Me If You Can - starring Bill Bixby and Frank Sutton
- Fiddler on the Roof - starring Jan Peerce
- Forty Carats - starring Zsa Zsa Gabor
- George M! - starring Joel Grey
- The Great Waltz - starring Sally Ann Howes
- Hello Dolly! - starring Ann Miller
- Man of La Mancha - starring Giorgio Tozzi
- The Most Happy Fella - starring Howard Keel
- Plaza Suite - starring Paul Lynde
- The Pleasure of His Company - starring Douglas Fairbanks Jr.
- Send Me No Flowers - starring Harvey Korman, Vicki Lawrence, and Lyle Waggoner
- The Sound of Music - starring Barbara Eden

=== 1972 ===
- 1776 - starring Joel Grey
- Butterflies Are Free - starring Eileen Heckart and Keir Dullea
- Can-Can - starring Ann Miller
- Come Blow Your Horn - starring Bill Bixby
- Everybody Loves Opal - starring Phyllis Diller
- Good News - starring Alan Sues and the New Christy Minstrels
- Last of the Red Hot Lovers - starring Dom DeLuise
- Meet Me in St. Louis - starring Jane Powell
- Milk and Honey - starring Gordon MacRae
- The Moon Is Blue - starring Karen Valentine and Don Ameche
- Music in the Air - starring Giorgio Tozzi, Marion Marlowe and Andy Devine
- Oklahoma! - starring John Davidson
- The Rainmaker - starring Burt Reynolds
- This Was Burlesque - starring Ann Corio

=== 1973 ===
- Applause - starring Alexis Smith
- Arsenic and Old Lace - starring William Shatner
- Born Yesterday - starring Karen Valentine, Edward Asner, and Lyle Waggoner
- Guys and Dolls - starring David Birney and Meredith Baxter
- How the Other Half Loves - starring George Maharis
- The Music Man - starring John Davidson
- My Daughter's Rated X - starring Paul Lynde
- Once Upon a Mattress - starring Lucie Arnaz, Rudy Vallee and Kay Medford
- The Pajama Game - starring Juliet Prowse
- The Prisoner of Second Avenue - starring Jerry Stiller and Anne Meara
- Promises, Promises - starring Rich Little and David Doyle
- South Pacific - starring Ann Blyth

=== 1974 ===
- 6 Rms Riv Vu - starring Sally Field and Jerry Orbach
- Annie Get Your Gun - starring Florence Henderson and Richard Fredricks
- Finishing Touches - starring Robert Reed and Barbara Rush
- Gigi - starring Lesley Ann Warren
- The Jack Cassidy and Shirley Jones Show - also starring Ronnie Schell
- Kiss Me, Kate - starring Patrice Munsel and John Raitt
- Luv - starring Dom DeLuise, Joyce Van Patten, and Bill McCutcheon
- Mother is Engaged - starring Paul Lynde
- No, No, Nanette - starring Gale Gordon, Vicki Lawrence, and Virginia Mayo
- Oliver! - starring Vincent Price
- Sunday in New York - starring Desi Arnaz, Jr.
- Take Me Along - starring Gene Kelly
- The Tunnel of Love - starring Martin Milner and Kent McCord

=== 1975 ===
- Bitter Sweet - starring Roberta Peters
- The Boy Friend - starring Rhonda Fleming
- Bus Stop - starring Karen Valentine and Rose Marie
- The Cooch Dancer - starring Edie Adams, Victor Buono, and Pete Candoli
- An Evening with John Davidson
- Mack and Mabel - starring Karen Morrow, Terence Monk, and Tommy Tune
- Marlene Dietrich in Concert
- On a Clear Day You Can See Forever - starring Shirley Jones
- Peter Pan - starring Sandy Duncan and Christopher Hewett
- Private Lives - starring Dyan Cannon and Keir Dullea
- She Loves Me - starring Jack Jones and Noel Harrison
- Stop, Thief, Stop! - starring Paul Lynde and Alice Ghostley
- Sugar - starring Mickey Rooney and Ken Berry
- Under the Yum Yum Tree - starring McLean Stevenson

=== 1976 ===
- Accent on Youth - starring Ricardo Montalban
- Damn Yankees - starring Vincent Price
- An Evening with Dom DeLuise
- Funny Girl - starring Carol Lawrence
- A Funny Thing Happened on the Way to the Forum - starring Sonny Bono
- George Washington Slept Here - starring James Coco and Dody Goodman
- Irene - starring Jane Powell and Patsy Kelly
- A Little Night Music - starring Eva Gabor, Earl Wrightson, and Lois Hunt
- The Mitzi Gaynor Show
- Norman, Is That You? - starring Harvey Korman
- Panama Hattie - starring Ann Miller
- Room Service - starring Henry Winkler and Didi Conn
- Shenandoah - starring Ed Ames
- The Student Prince - starring Allan Jones and Rip Taylor

=== 1977 ===
- Anything Goes - starring Ann Miller and Bobby Van
- Camelot - starring Rock Hudson
- Fiddler on the Roof - starring Ed Ames
- Godspell - starring The Hudson Brothers
- Grease - starring Roz Kelly and Barry Williams
- Heaven Can Wait - starring Peter Strauss
- Kismet - starring Hal Linden and Dolores Gray
- Li'l Abner - starring Lucie Arnaz and Dirk Benedict
- Make A Million - starring McLean Stevenson
- The Merry Widow - starring Barbara Meister
- Never Too Late - starring Tom Bosley and Nanette Fabray
- Seesaw - starring Lucie Arnaz and Terence Monk
- Sweet Charity - starring Carol Lawrence
- Wonderful Town - starring Cloris Leachman

=== 1978 ===
- California Suite - starring Brenda Vaccaro and James Farentino
- Chicago - starring Allen Ludden and Sue Ane Langdon
- Count Dracula - starring John Gavin and Victor Buono
- The Impossible Years - starring Paul Lynde
- The King and I - starring Roberta Peters and James Shigeta
- The Magic Show - no featured performers
- Mame - starring Kitty Carlisle and Don Ameche
- Man of La Mancha - starring John Raitt
- Paint Your Wagon - starring Gordon MacRae
- Pippin - starring Barry Williams, Maxene Andrews, and Tommy Tune
- Show Boat - starring Mickey Rooney

=== 1979 ===
- Ballroom - starring Audra Lindley
- Blossom Time - starring Kitty Carlisle and Allan Jones
- Bubbling Brown Sugar - starring Cab Calloway
- Don't Drink the Water - starring Paul Lynde
- Hello, Dolly! - starring Betty White and Bill McCutcheon
- I Love My Wife - starring the Smothers Brothers
- The Mitzi Gaynor Show
- Oklahoma! - starring Dirk Benedict
- Picnic - starring Donna Mills and Joe Namath
- Same Time, Next Year - starring Katherine Helmond and Robert Mandan
- Shenandoah - starring Ed Ames
- Walking Happy - starring Tommy Tune, Elizabeth Allen, and Jesse White

=== 1980 ===
- 4 Girls 4 - starring Rosemary Clooney, Helen O'Connell, Rose Marie, and Margaret Whiting
- Brigadoon - starring John Gabriel and Alan Sues
- Chapter Two - starring Joyce DeWitt and Tab Hunter
- Deathtrap - starring Robert Reed and Imogene Coca
- Grease - starring Gary Sandy and Barry Williams
- The Mitzi Gaynor Show
- My Fair Lady - starring Pam Dawber
- Side by Side by Sondheim - starring Leslie Uggams, Anna Maria Alberghetti, and Dorothy Lamour
- The Sound of Music - starring Carol Lawrence
- South Pacific - starring Ed Ames
- The Wiz - Deborah Lynn Sharpe, Ira Hawkins

=== 1981 ===
- 4 Girls 4 - starring Rosemary Clooney, Helen O'Connell, Rose Marie, and Margaret Whiting
- Ain't Misbehavin' - starring The 5th Dimension
- Barefoot in the Park - starring Robert Urich
- Bye Bye Birdie - starring Bert Convy
- Cabaret - starring Billy Crystal
- Camelot - starring Ed Ames
- George M! - starring Ken Berry
- The Greenwich Village Scandals of 1923 - starring Cyd Charisse and Imogene Coca
- How to Succeed in Business Without Really Trying - starring Fred Grandy and Don Ameche
- The Music Man - starring Dick Gautier
- Seven Brides for Seven Brothers - starring Debby Boone

=== 1982 ===
- The Best Little Whorehouse in Texas - starring Dottie West
- Gigi - starring Patricia Morison
- Meet Me in St Louis - starring Cathy Rigby
- Four New Girls - starring Rosemary Clooney, Rose Marie, Helen O'Connell, and Martha Raye
- Oliver! - starring Rip Taylor
- The Pirates of Penzance - starring Karla DeVito
- They're Playing Our Song - starring Susan Anton
- The Unsinkable Molly Brown - starring Connie Stevens
- Wally's Cafe - starring Tim Conway
- West Side Story starring Barry Williams

=== 1983 ===
- Annie - starring Martha Raye
- Artist and Models and Madness - starring Phil Ford and Mimi Hines
- Barnum - starring Gary Sandy
- Catch Me If You Can - starring Wayne Rogers and Elaine Joyce
- Fiddler on the Roof - starring William Conrad
- Goodbye, Charlie - starring Morgan Fairchild and James Farentino
- High Button Shoes - starring Gavin MacLeod
- No, No, Nanette - starring Van Johnson and Gloria DeHaven
- Pal Joey - starring Joel Grey and Alexis Smith
- Promises, Promises - starring John James

=== 1984 ===
- Baby - starring Edie Adams
- Funny Girl - starring Juliet Prowse
- Grease - starring Christopher Atkins
- Joseph and the Amazing Technicolor Dreamcoat - starring David Cassidy
- Little Shop of Horrors - National Tour
- Mack and Mabel - starring Lee Horsley
- Man of La Mancha - starring Ed Ames
- The Mitzi Gaynor Show
- Oklahoma! - starring John Davidson
- Once Upon a Mattress - starring Andrea Martin
- Whoopee! - starring Jay Johnson and Karen Morrow
- Woman of the Year - starring Carol Lawrence

=== 1986 ===
- Do Black Patent Leather Shoes Really Reflect Up? - starring Robby Benson and Karla DeVito
- Evita - starring Robby Benson and Karla DeVito
- Go Ahead and Laugh - starring Mickey Rooney
- Jesus Christ Superstar - starring Brent Barrett
- A Little Night Music - starring Mariette Hartley
- Nite Club Confidential - starring Vivian Blaine
- Nunsense - no featured performers
- The Pia Zadora Show
- Shenandoah - starring Ed Ames

=== 1987 ===
- Do Black Patent Leather Shoes Really Reflect Up? - starring Robby Benson and Karla DeVito
- I Love My Wife - starring Barry Williams
- Nunsense - no featured performers

=== 1995 ===
- The Best Little Whorehouse in Texas - starring Barbara Eden
- Gentlemen Prefer Blondes - starring Loni Anderson
- Man of La Mancha - starring David Canary
- The Man Who Came to Dinner - starring Tony Randall and Valerie Perrine
- The Mitzi Gaynor Show
- South Pacific - starring Robert Goulet
- The Student Prince - starring Jerome Hines
