= Alberghetti =

Alberghetti is a surname. Notable people with the surname include:

- Anna Maria Alberghetti (born 1936), Italian singer and actress
- Carla Alberghetti (born 1939), Italian actress and singer
- Giovanni Alberghetti (fl. c. 1491–1505), Italian sculptor
- Francesca Alberghetti, a character on the TV series Chicago Hope, played by Barbara Hershey
