= Teignmouth Lido =

Outdoor swimming pool in Devon, England

Coordinates: 50.548446°N 3.491558°W

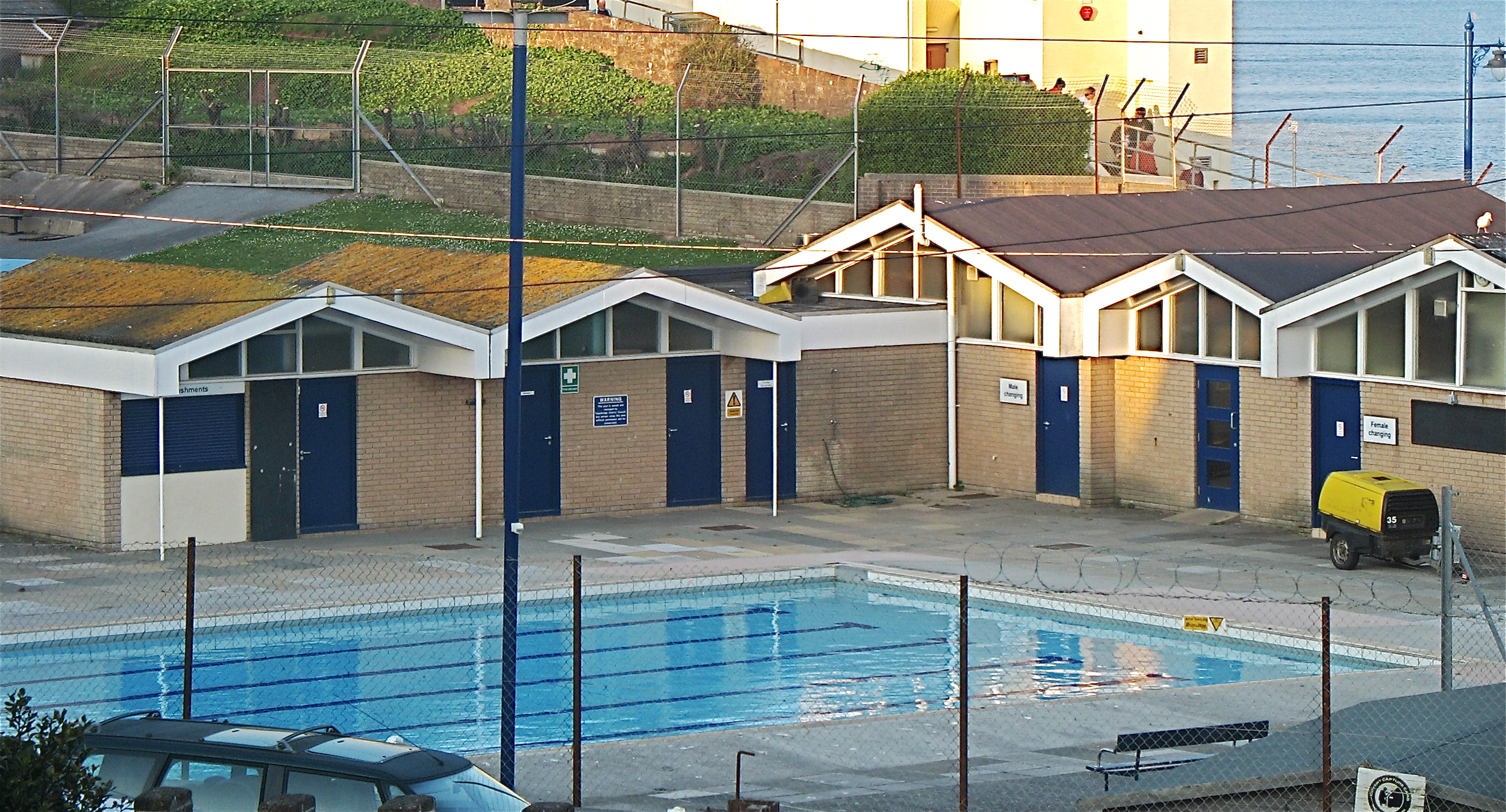
Teignmouth Lido out of season

Teignmouth Lido is an open-air heated public lido at Eastcliff Walk, Teignmouth, Devon, England. It is located directly behind the town's seaside promenade.

Built in the 1970s, Teignmouth Lido has a heated pool measuring 25 metres (80 ft) x 12.5 metres (40 ft). It charges for admission and is open to the public during the summer months, typically May to September. It is one of three outdoor pools operated by Teignbridge District Council, the others being at Buckfastleigh and Ashburton.

As well as being open to the public, the pool is opened privately for swimming lessons, schools and private hire groups such as sports club who run evening training sessions.

== History ==
Unlike most of the outdoor pools in the UK, Teignmouth Lido is of comparatively recent construction, having been built in the 1970s. A number of schemes were proposed during the subsequent years to upgrade the lido and potentially give it a roof, but none gained funding.

In 2010 Teignbridge District Council published "A Vision for Teignmouth", a regeneration proposal document which suggested a number of possible futures for the Lido:

- Retaining the public pool on a reduced site while allowing the building of private apartments or a hotel on the remainder.
- Refurbishing the pool and permitting the development of a spa complex on the rest of the site.
- Relocating the pool to an alternative site in Teignmouth such as the Den or Lower Point.

The pool did not open in 2020 due to the COVID-19 pandemic in the United Kingdom, and it remained closed during 2021 due to the installation of a heat pump to reduce greenhouse gas emissions from the pool's heating system. In 2022 planning permission was granted for a solar photovoltaic system to be used in conjunction with a battery energy storage system and a pergola was built for the photovoltaics. The total cost of the conversion was over £800,000 and funding was provided by central government. Project delays meant that the Lido remained closed during 2022. It reopened for the summer of 2023 but shut earlier than planned in late August due to a water leak which was repaired to allow for re-opening in May 2024.

In October 2024, Teignbridge District Council approved a resolution to carry out an options appraisal for the Lido, in order to:

- Consider whether it is financially viable to continue to operate it.
- Determine whether it is possible to improve its financial viability.
- Explore alternative options including disposal, transfer, and potential redevelopment.
- Look at alternative uses for the Lido site.

In February 2026 the executive of Teignbridge District Council voted to close the lido to save £74,000 a year. Public objections were raised and a petition to stop the closure was signed by over 2,500 people. The Teignmouth Community Lido Trust said it wanted to take over running the site. In March 2026, the Council agreed to open it for the 2026 summer season and work with community groups on plans for its future. The Lido was also listed as an asset of community value. In May 2026, the Council appointed a commercial agent to sell the Lido and invited bids from interested parties, including the Save Teignmouth Lido group.

== See also ==
- History of lidos in the United Kingdom
- Shoalstone Pool, a seawater lido in Brixham, Devon
- Tinside Pool, a lido in Plymouth, Devon
- The Rock Pool, Westward Ho! also in Devon
