= Teignmouth =

Seaside town in Devon, England

Coordinates: 50.5515°N 3.4886°W

Teignmouth: The Gem of South Devon
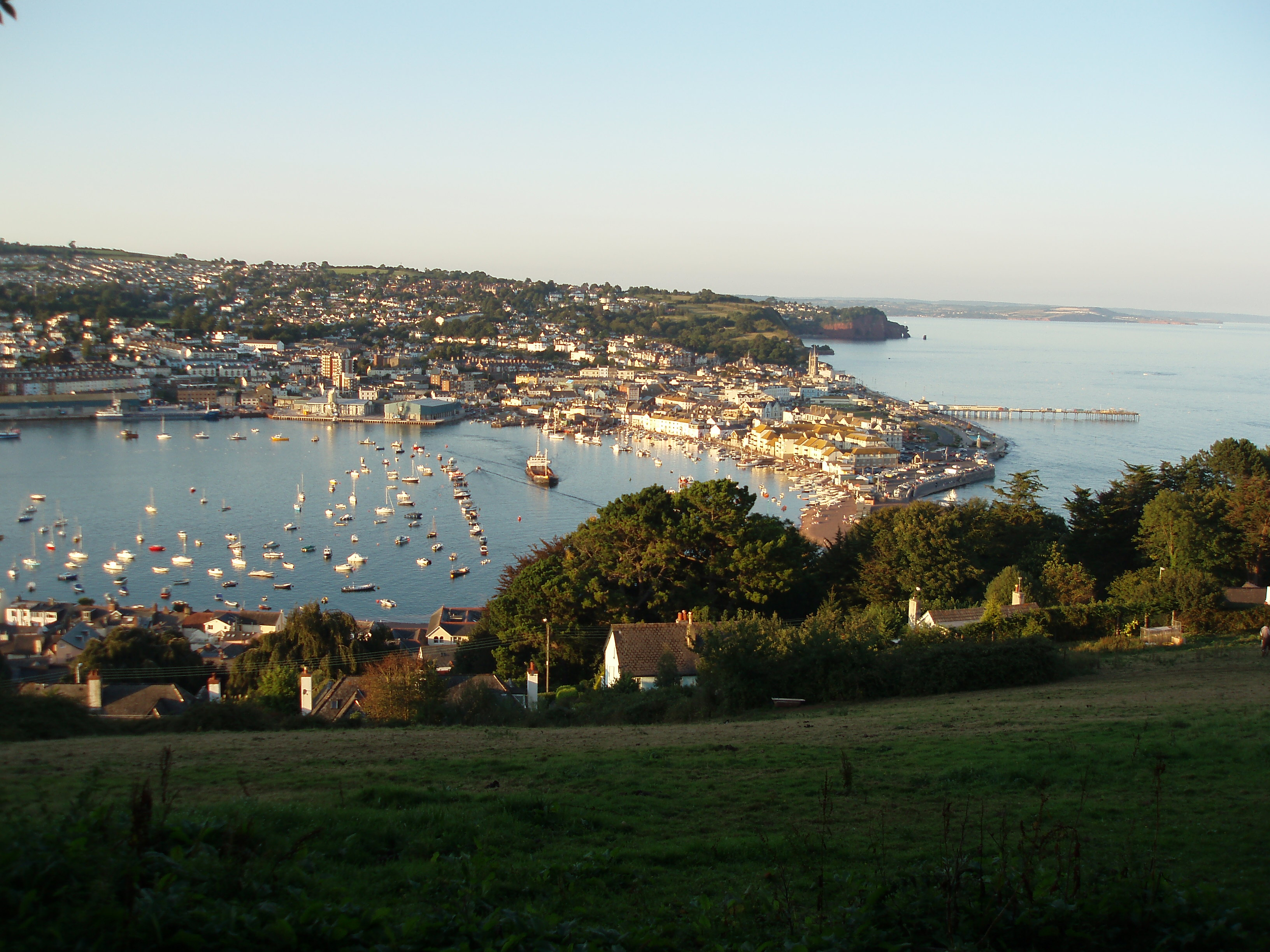
- Teignmouth

- Location within Devon
- Population: 14,932 (2021 Census)
- OS grid reference: SX945735
- Civil parish: Teignmouth
- District: Teignbridge
- Shire county: Devon
- Region: South West
- Country: England
- Sovereign state: United Kingdom
- Post town: TEIGNMOUTH
- Postcode district: TQ14
- Dialling code: 01626
- Police: Devon and Cornwall
- Fire: Devon and Somerset
- Ambulance: South Western
- UK Parliament: Newton Abbot

Teignmouth (/ˈtɪnməθ/ TIN-məth) is a seaside town, fishing port and civil parish in the English county of Devon. It lies on the north bank of the estuary mouth of the River Teign, about 12 miles (19 km) south of Exeter. The town had a population of 14,932 at the 2021 census.

From the 1800s onwards, the town grew rapidly in size from a fishing port associated with the Newfoundland cod industry to a fashionable resort of some note in Georgian times; there was further expansion after the opening of the South Devon Railway in 1846. Today, its port still operates and the town remains a popular seaside and day-trip holiday location.

== History ==
=== Pre-19th century ===
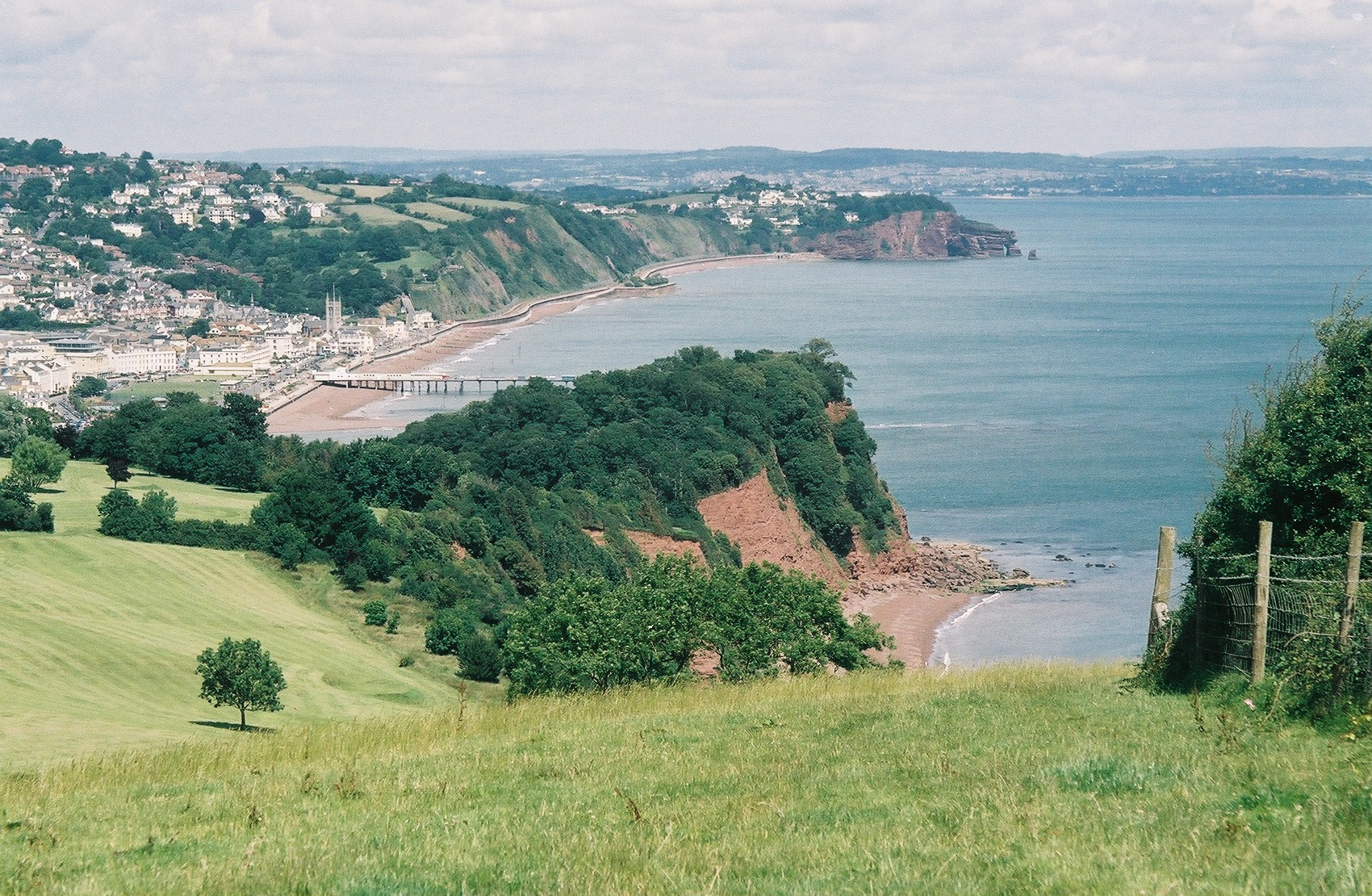
Teignmouth from above the Ness

The first record of Teignmouth, Tengemuða, meaning mouth of the stream, was in 1044. Nonetheless, settlements very close by are attested earlier, with the banks of the Teign estuary having been in Saxon hands since at least 682; a battle between the Ancient Britons and Saxons was recorded on Haldon in 927 and Danish raids having occurred on the Teign estuary in 1001.

There were originally two villages, East and West Teignmouth, separated by a stream called the Tame, which emptied into the Teign through marshland by the current fish quay. Neither village is mentioned in the Domesday Book, but East Teignmouth was granted a market by charter in 1253 and one for West Teignmouth followed a few years later. The Tame now runs under the town in culverts and is visible only higher up the town as Brimley Brook, joined by smaller streams such as the Winterbourne (an intermittent stream, which flows only in winter or after heavy rain).

Documents indicate that Teignmouth was a significant port by the early 14th century, second in Devon only to Dartmouth. It was attacked by the French in 1340 and sent seven ships and 120 men to the expedition against Calais in 1347. Its relative importance waned during the 15th century and it did not figure in an official record of 1577. This may have been due to silting up of the harbour caused by tin mining on Dartmoor.

During the 17th century, in common with other Channel ports, Teignmouth ships suffered from raids from Dunkirkers, who were privateers from Flemish ports. It is possible that smuggling was the town's most significant trade at this time, though cod fishing in Newfoundland was also of great importance.

In July 1690, after the French Admiral Anne Hilarion de Tourville defeated an Anglo-Dutch fleet at the Battle of Beachy Head, the French fleet was anchored in Torbay and some of the galley fleet travelled the short distance up the coast and attacked Teignmouth. A petition to the Lord Lieutenant from the inhabitants described the incident:

... on the 26th day of this instant July 1690 by Foure of the clocke in the morning, your poor petitioners were invaded (by the French) to the number of 1,000 or thereabouts, who in the space of three hours tyme, burnt down to the ground the dwelling houses of 240 persons of our parish and upwards, plundered and carried away all our goods, defaced our churches, burnt ten of our ships in the harbour, besides fishing boats, netts and other fishing craft ...

After examining 'creditable persons', the Justices of the Peace concluded that:

by the late horrid invasion there were within the space of 12 houres burnt downe and consumed 116 dwelling houses ... and also 172 dwelling houses were rifled and plundered and two parish churches much ruined, plundred and defaced, besides the burning of ten saile of shipps with the furniture thereof, and the goods and merchandise therein ...

As a result, the Crown issued a church brief that authorised the collection of £11,000 for the aid of the town. Churches from as far afield as Yorkshire contributed and the collections enabled the further development of the port. This was the last invasion of England (Note: Though not of Britain, as the French invaded Carreg Gwastad, near Fishguard, Pembrokeshire in 1797.) and French Street, with its museum, is named in memory of the occasion.

In the 1600s and 1700s, there are records of a windmill on the Den – an area that was then a large sand dune and is now a grassy public open space near the seafront. By 1759, this windmill was demolished.

=== 19th and 20th century ===
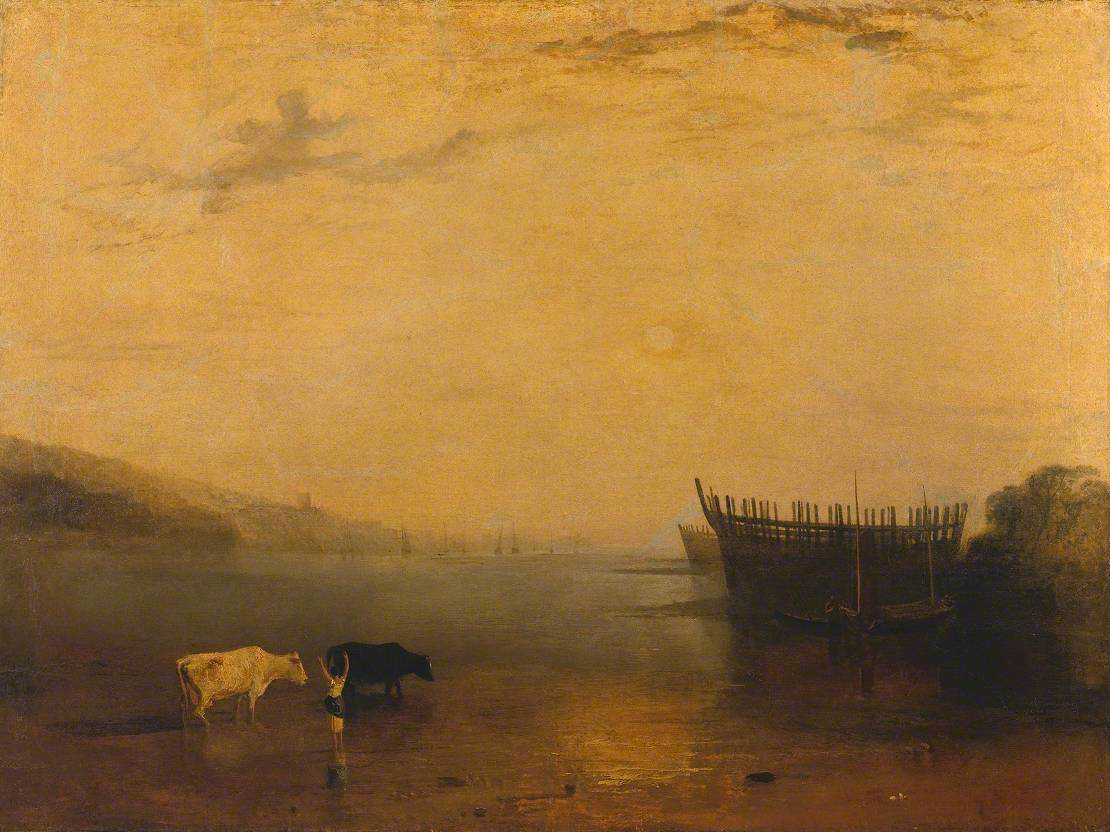
Teignmouth by J.M.W. Turner (1812)

A new advantageous Plan of Privateering
For a Six Months Cruize
All Gentlemen Seamen and Able Landmen who delight in the Music of Great Guns and distressing the Enemies of Great Britain have now a fine opportunity of making their Fortunes by entering on Board The Dragon Privateer ... now ready to be launch'd in the Harbour of Teignmouth... Any persons capable of beating a Drum or blowing a French horn shall have great encouragement.

— Advertisement for the Dragon, 1779.

In the late 18th century, privateering was common in Teignmouth, as it was in other west country ports. In 1779, the French ship L'Emulation with a cargo of sugar, coffee and cotton was offered for sale at "Rendle's Great Sale Room" in the town. Teignmouth people fitted out two privateers: Dragon with 16 guns and 70 men; and Bellona, described as carrying "16 guns, 4 cohorns and 8 swivels". Bellona set sail on her first voyage in September 1779 and was "oversett in a violent Gust of Wind" off Dawlish, with the loss of 25 crew members.

The Newfoundland fisheries continued to provide the main employment into the early 19th century (e.g. Job Brothers & Co., Limited). With the men in Newfoundland for most of the year, the women did the local fishing and rowed the ferries across the estuary. Early tourists, such as Fanny Burney, referred to the women as the "Amazonians" of Shaldon and Teignmouth, and wrote of their strength, health and tendency to wear trousers or hitch their skirts up to their knees to fish.

As the fisheries declined, tourism increased. A tea house was built on the Den in 1787 amongst the local fishermen's drying nets. By 1803, Teignmouth was called a "fashionable watering place" and the resort continued to develop during the 19th century. Its two churches were rebuilt soon after 1815 and the first bridge across the estuary to Shaldon was built in 1827; George Templer's New Quay opened at the port; and the esplanade, Den Crescent and the central Assembly Rooms (later the cinema) were laid out. The population in the 1841 census was 4,459 inhabitants. The South Devon Railway arrived in 1846 and the pier was built 1865–7.

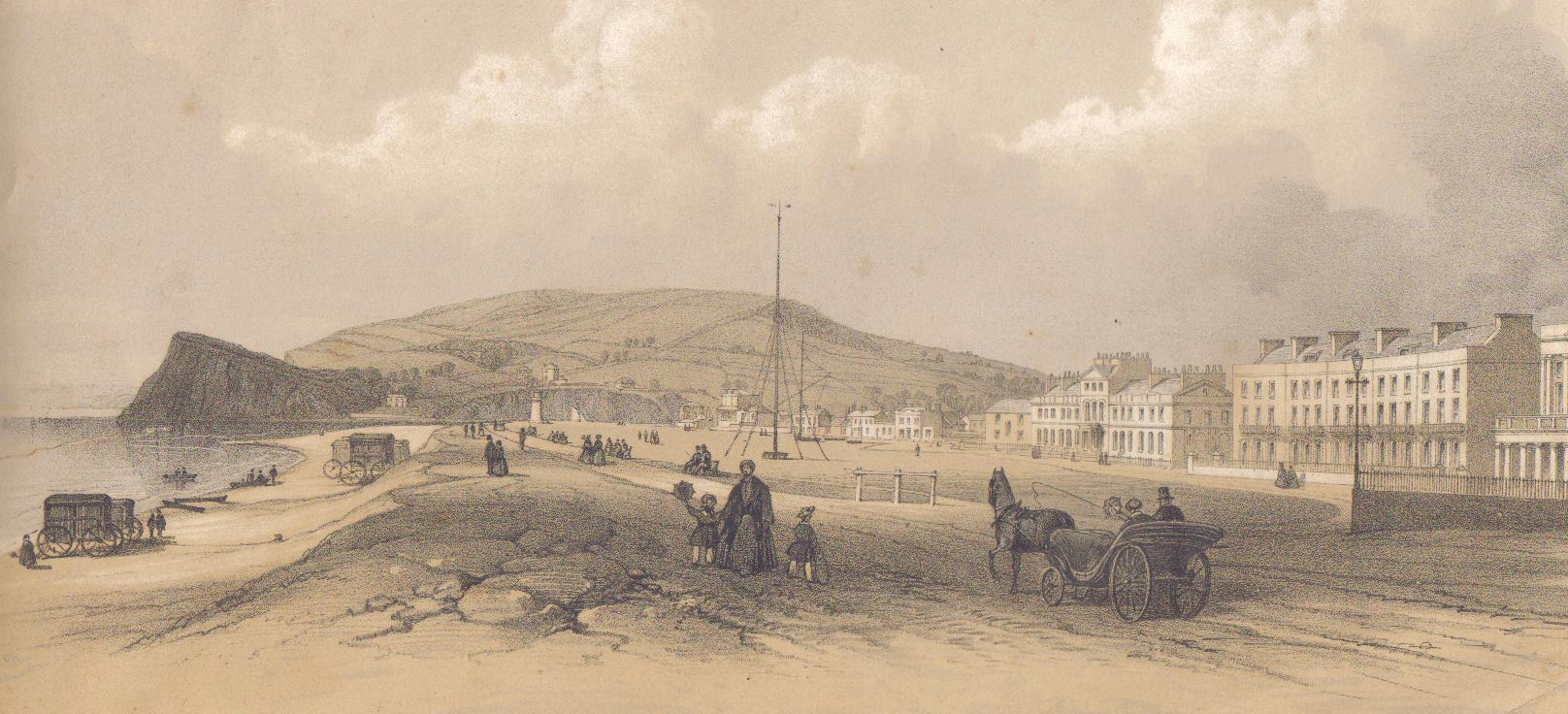
A view of Teignmouth, the Den and the Ness at Shaldon (19th century)

A version of the legend of the Parson and Clerk, dating to 1900, tells the tale of the Bishop of Exeter visiting Teignmouth and whilst being guided by a local priest, the devil turns them both to stone, which is seen in the form of two stacks.

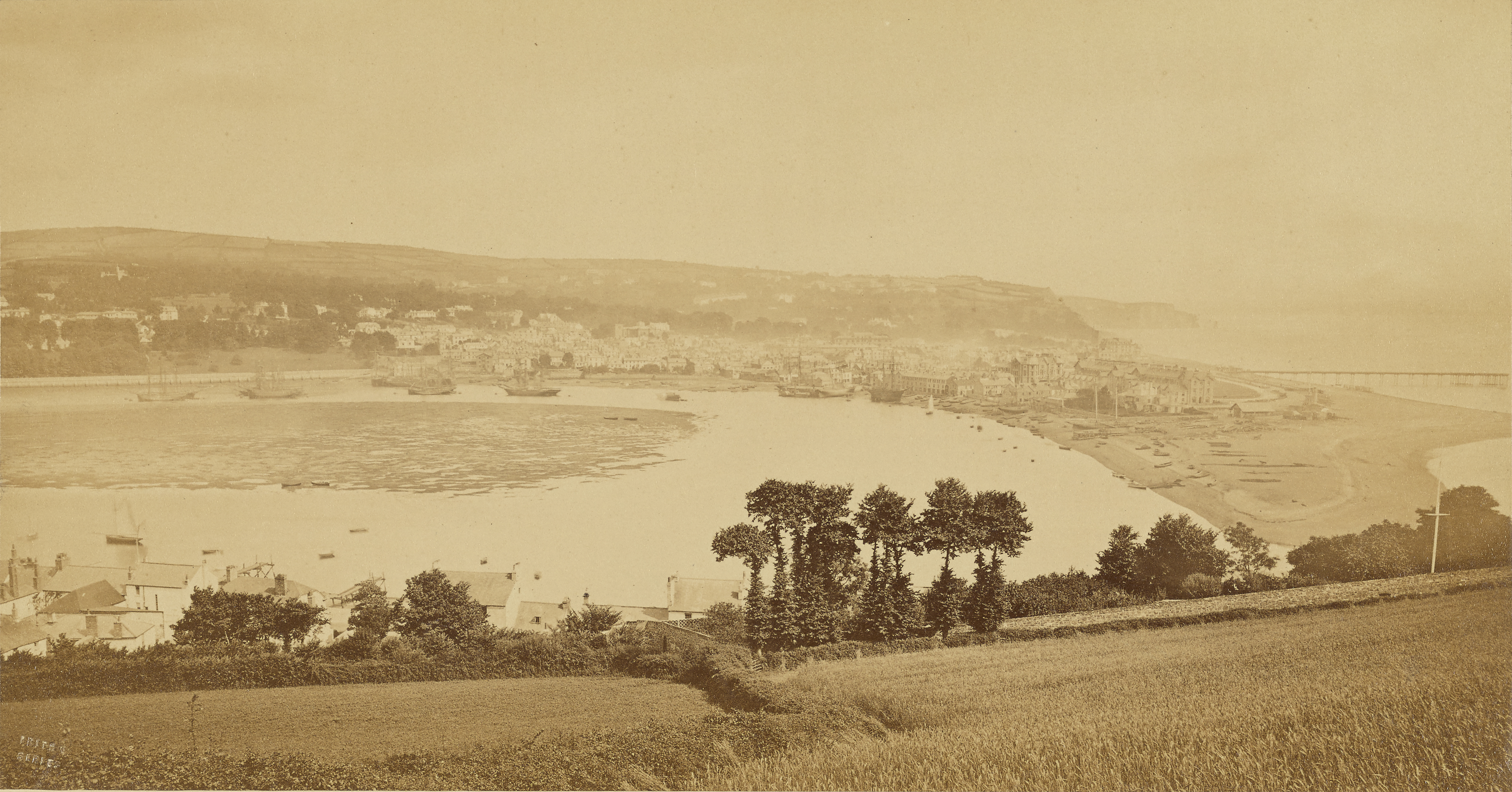
Teignmouth (1860s-1880s) by Francis Frith

World War I had a disruptive effect on Teignmouth; over 175 men from the town lost their lives and many businesses did not survive. In the 1920s, as the economy started to recover, a golf course opened on Little Haldon; the Morgan Giles shipbuilding business was established, and charabancs took employees and their families for annual outings to Dartmoor and elsewhere. By the 1930s, the town was again thriving and, with the Haldon Aerodrome and School of Flying nearby, Teignmouth was advertised as the only south coast resort offering complete aviation facilities.

During the World War II, Teignmouth suffered badly from "tip and run" air raids. It was bombed 21 times between July 1940 and February 1944; 79 people were killed, 151 wounded, 228 houses were destroyed and over 2,000 damaged in the raids. Teignmouth's hospital was bombed during a raid on 8 May 1941, killing three nurses and seven patients. It was rebuilt and reopened in September 1954, making it the first complete general hospital in the country to be built after the formation of the National Health Service.

A US Navy plan was created, which proposed to dam the harbour and set up a seaplane base, but it was abandoned as the war turned in favour of the allies.

=== 21st century ===
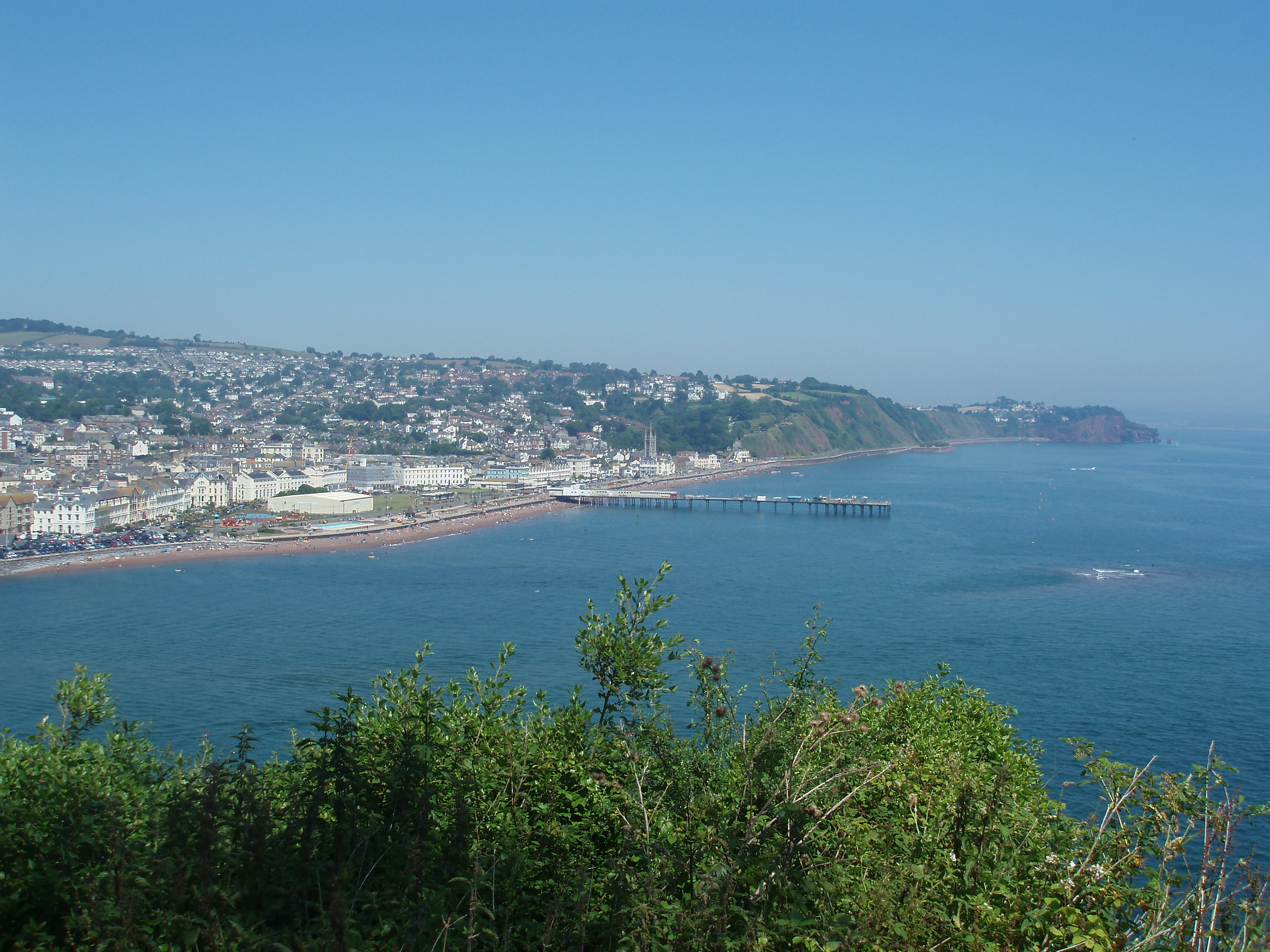
Teignmouth, from The Ness

On 27 July 2005, Teignmouth received status as Devon's first Fairtrade Town. Also in 2005, the volunteer Teignmouth Regeneration Project, in association with the town, district and county councils, published a strategic plan that identified issues to be dealt with by 2015. Among the issues listed are to develop quality tourism, alleviate the danger of flooding to the town and provide affordable housing.

In May 2010, Teignbridge District Council put forward for consultation, A Vision for Teignmouth, which was a plan consisting of 21 regeneration projects for the town. A skatepark was opened on the seafront in July 2010 and flood defences at the Fish Quay were completed in October 2012.

Teignmouth Pier was damaged, with part of it washing away, during Storm Ingrid that hit the South Devon coast on 24 January 2026. A large sinkhole was discovered on Sprey Point in the storm's aftermath two days later.

=== Port ===
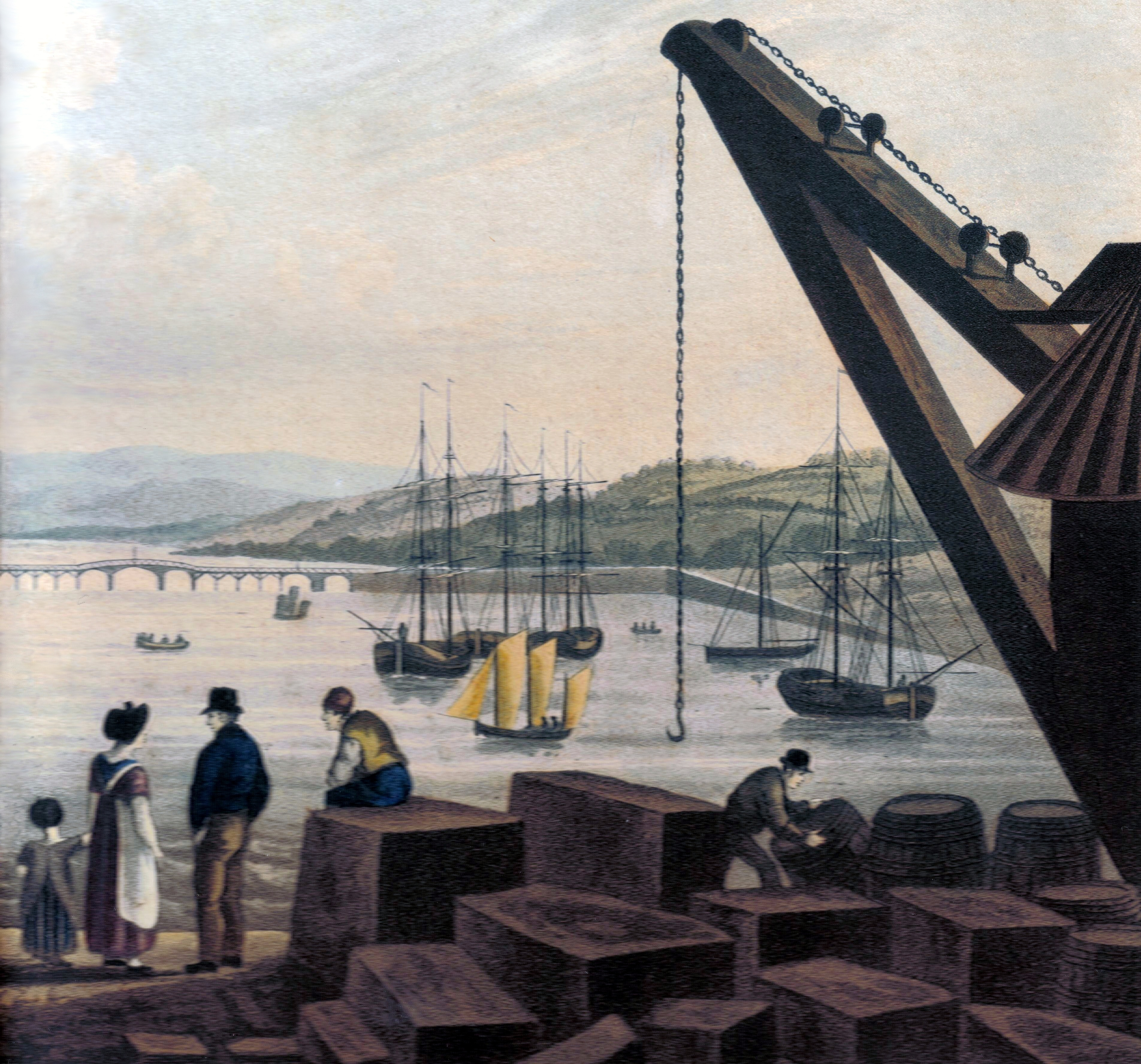
The New Quay at Teignmouth in 1827, with a large crane and blocks of cut granite ready for transshipment

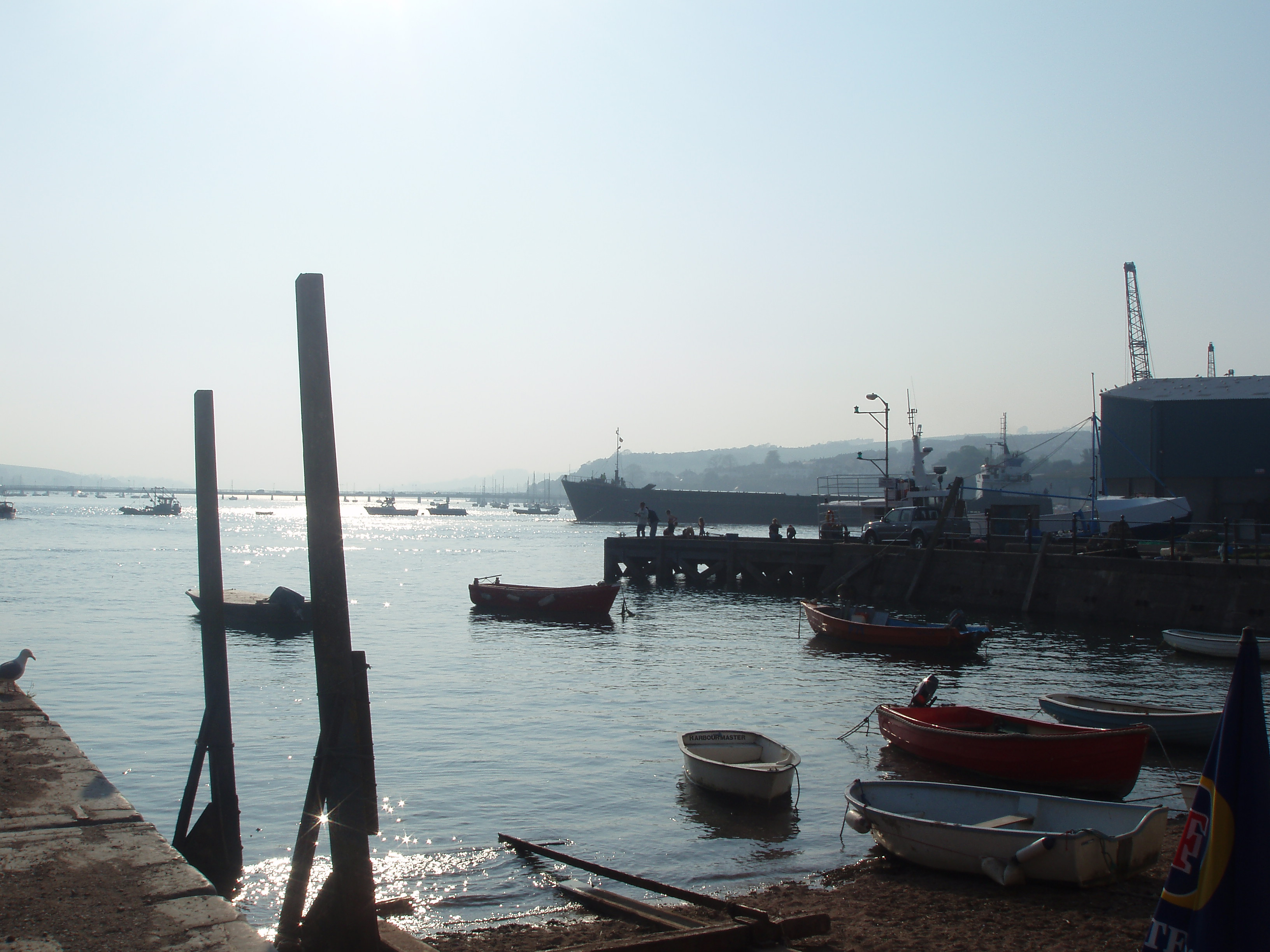
New Quay (2006)

The port of Teignmouth, in existence since the 13th century, remains active; it handles mostly clay, timber and grain.

The Old Quay was built in the mid-18th century on land leased from Lord Clifford. The opening of the Stover Canal by James Templer in 1792 provided a boost to the port, due to the ease with which ball clay could be transported from the mines north of Newton Abbot. After travelling along the canal, the barges continued down the estuary to the port. By 1820, this trade was supplemented by granite from the quarries near Haytor on Dartmoor carried via the unique granite-tracked Haytor Granite Tramway which was linked to the Stover Canal. The granite to build the new London Bridge came via this route and was sent from the New Quay, which had been built for this traffic in 1821–25 by George Templer, James's son.

The Old Quay was sold to George Hennet in 1850 and became the centre of his trading network. It was connected to the South Devon Railway the previous year.

Until 1852, Teignmouth was legally part of the Port of Exeter. In September of that year, after many years of campaigning (latterly under the leadership of George Hennet), the Lords Commissioners of the Treasury agreed that Teignmouth should be independent which was the cause of much celebration.

Teignmouth has a tradition of shipbuilding from the 17th century. By the turn of the 19th century, there were three shipyards in Teignmouth, with three in Shaldon and Ringmore on the opposite side of the estuary. The industry declined in the early 20th century but, in 1921, Morgan Giles bought the last derelict shipbuilding yard and gave the industry a new stimulus. His shipyard became a major employer, building pleasure craft in peacetime and small craft such as torpedo boats during World War II. The business failed in 1968, not long after Donald Crowhurst's attempt to sail around the world.

The Shipwrecked Fishermen and Mariners' Royal Benevolent Society sent a lifeboat to Teignmouth in 1851 and kept it in a boathouse on the beach near the Custom House. In 1854, the society transferred its lifeboats to the Royal National Lifeboat Institution (RNLI). A new boathouse was provided on The Den with doors facing the harbour which was used until 1940. After a gap of fifty years, on 3 November 1990, the RNLI reopened Teignmouth Lifeboat Station with an Atlantic 21 inshore lifeboat.

Teignmouth Lighthouse was erected in 1845 to guide ships into the harbour.

=== Shaldon Bridge ===
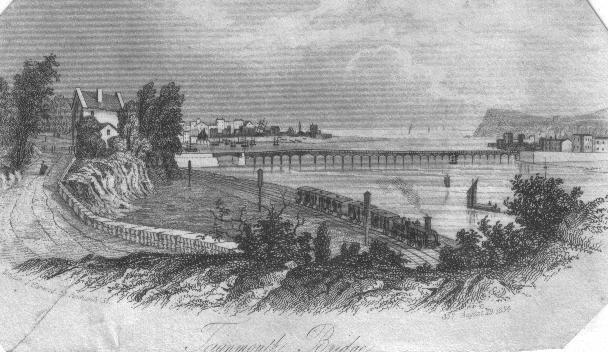
A broad gauge train leaving Teignmouth, with Shaldon Bridge and the Ness in the background (c.1854)

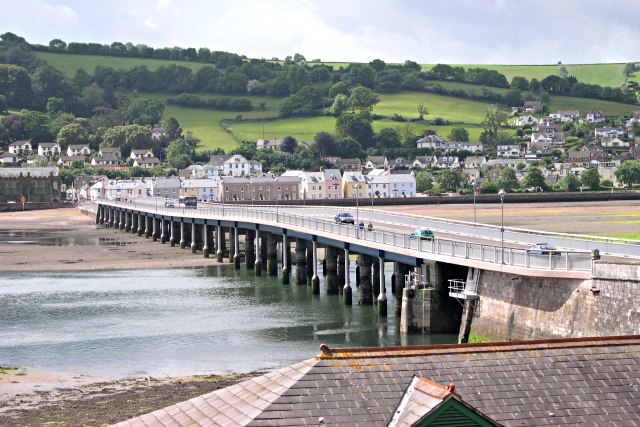
Shaldon Bridge (2004)

The original bridge was owned by the Teignmouth and Shaldon Bridge Company. The first stone was laid on 20 September 1824 and it opened on 8 June 1827. It had 34 wooden arches and was 1,671 feet (509 m) long, which made it the longest wooden bridge in England when built. It had abutment walls of a considerable length at either end, and a swing bridge at the Teignmouth end to allow sailing ships to pass up the estuary. It cost around £19,000 to build, but the overall expenditure was about £26,000 (equivalent to £2,375,700 in 2025) due to the costs of the necessary Act of Parliament and the purchase of the old ferry-rights. Toll houses were built at each end of the bridge and the one on the Teignmouth side survives.

After eleven years, on 27 June 1838, the centre arches of the bridge collapsed; the timbers had been eaten through by shipworms. It was rebuilt in wood and reopened on 13 April 1840, but it partially collapsed again in 1893.

The bridge was completely rebuilt between 1928 and 1931, using steel for the piers and main girders, and concrete for most of the deck, except for the opening span which used timber. The work was undertaken by the Teignmouth and Shaldon Bridge Company, with the consulting engineers Mott, Hay and Anderson and the contractor Mitchell Bros., Sons and Co. The overall length of the new bridge was 1,130 feet (340 m) carried on 22 spans, with an overall width of 28 feet 6 inches (8.69 m) providing a carriageway of 20 feet (6.1 m) and two footpaths 4 feet 3 inches (1.30 m) wide. Each span of four longitudinal girders rests at either end on a large capsill girder, which in turn is supported at its ends by circular piers built up of precast concrete blocks. Each pier rests on four reinforced concrete piles driven into the river bed. The new bridge allowed the lifting of the previous weight limit of 3 long tons (3,000 kg). A bascule span was provided in place of the previous opening span.

On 28 October 1948, Devon County Council bought the bridge from the Shaldon Bridge Company for £92,020 (equivalent to £2,890,000 in 2025) and tolls were abolished. The original paintwork was inadequate to deal with the environment, so repairs were required in 1960 and in 1980. In 1998, it was discovered that the bridge had severe structural defects and work to correct this continued until 2002; the bridge remaining open throughout. After this work was completed, residents nearby noticed that in certain wind conditions the bridge "whistles". As of 2007 the problem had not been solved.

In February 2016, Devon County Council announced that the moveable, lifting section of the bridge would be raised later in the year, for the first time since 2002. This is in order to satisfy a condition in the Act that permitted construction, that the opening section be maintained.

== Transport ==
=== Railway ===
Teignmouth railway station, which opened in 1846, is located close to the town centre. It lies between the stations of Dawlish and Newton Abbot on the South Devon Main Line and the Riviera Line.

The station is served by two train operating companies:

- Great Western Railway operates regular stopping trains on a local route between Exmouth, Exeter St Davids and Paignton. Some inter-city services between Plymouth and London Paddington stop here, as well as some services between Cardiff Central, Bristol Temple Meads, Plymouth and Penzance.
- CrossCountry services between Manchester Piccadilly, Birmingham New Street and Paignton stop here twice a day in each direction.

==== History ====
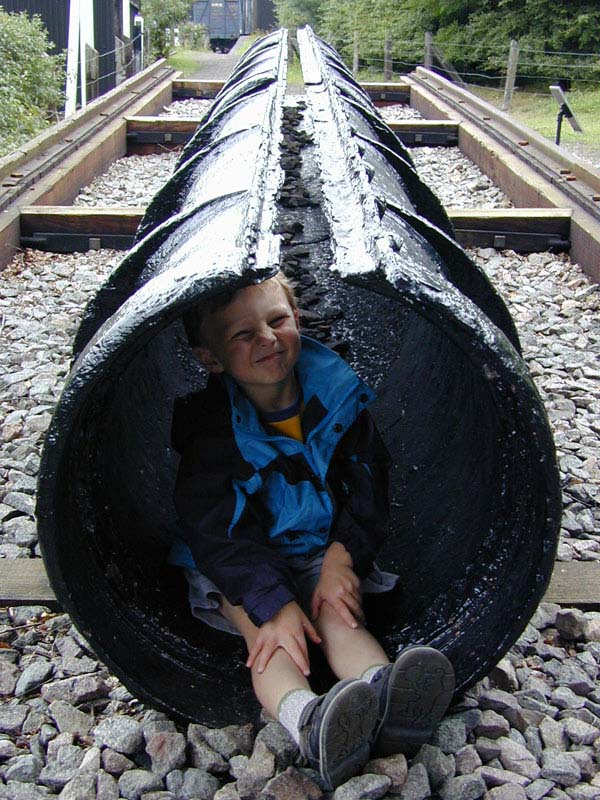
Broad-gauge rails and Brunel's atmospheric railway pipe at Didcot Railway Centre. A small child indicates the scale.

The line built by Isambard Kingdom Brunel runs along the South Devon Railway sea wall, which is a stone embankment between the sea and cliffs that runs for several miles between Teignmouth and Dawlish Warren. This line was originally both broad gauge and worked by the atmospheric system, with steam pump houses at regular intervals to create the vacuum. It was not successful for a host of reasons and was converted to normal steam locomotive working. Redundant sections of the atmospheric railway pipes were used as drains all over Teignmouth; one was set in the roadside in Woodway Lane, near Woodway House.

Such was the terrific force of the impelled water that along the sea-wall and railway huge coping-stones, probably averaging one ton each, were tossed about like corks...

— Illustrated London News, 1859.

In December 1852, a large landslip from the cliffs east of the town caused the railway to close for four days; and, in 1855 and 1859, the sea broke through the line at Teignmouth. There have been many more closures since, caused both by landslips from the cliffs and breaches by the sea, especially in winter. In 2010, the sea walls and adjoining estuaries were costing Network Rail around £500,000 per year to maintain. In 1936, the Great Western Railway surveyed an inland deviation between Exminster and Bishopsteignton, with a shorter route starting near Dawlish Warren; however, the advent of World War II brought these projects to an end.

=== Buses ===
Local bus services are operated predominantly by Stagecoach South West and Country Bus (Newton Abbot); key routes that serve the town include:

- 2: Exeter to Newton Abbot
- 22: Dawlish Warren to Paignton
- 81: Town centre to Teignmouth Morrisons.

=== Roads ===
The town lies at the junction of the A379 coast road, the A381 to Newton Abbot and the B3192. The latter climbs up to join the A380, near Ashcombe, and hence on to the M5 motorway 12 miles (19 km) away.

A road bridge links the town to Shaldon.

=== Ferry ===
Teignmouth is also linked to Shaldon by a passenger ferry at the river mouth.

== Geography ==
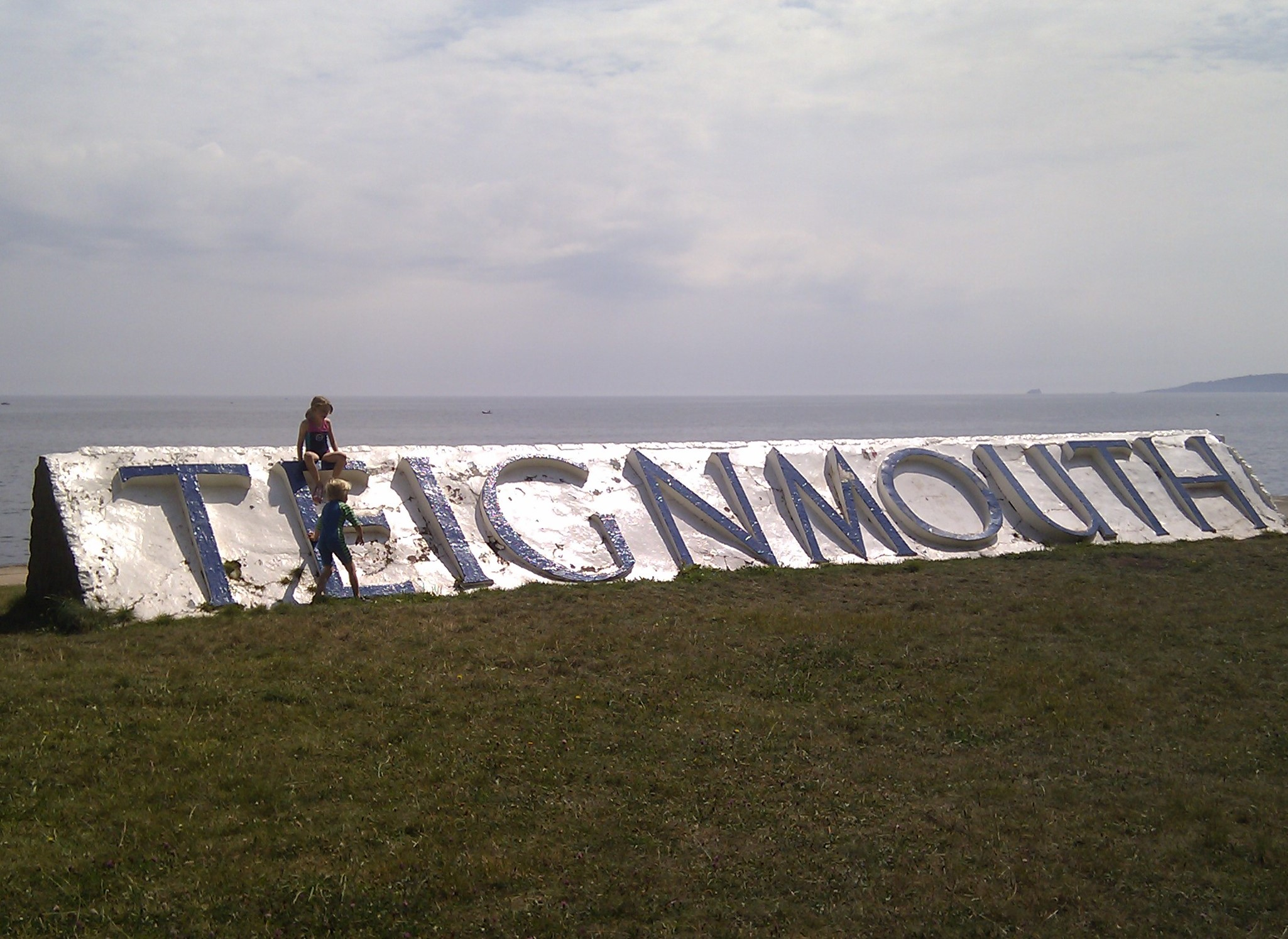
The Teignmouth sign on Sprey Point

The town is located on the north bank of the mouth of the estuary of the River Teign. The red sandstone headland on the south (Shaldon) side, called The Ness, is the most recognisable symbol of the town from the seaward side.

In the harbour area was the Salty; a small flat island created through dredging operations but levelled, supposedly to improve natural scouring of the main channel for shipping, in recent years to leave a large tidal sand bank frequented by seabirds and cockle-collectors. Salmon nets are still employed by locals, especially near Shaldon Bridge.

The estuary seems disproportionately large for the size of the river flowing through it; this is especially apparent at low tide because it is a drowned valley, caused by a relative rise in sea level following the last Ice Age.

=== Climate ===
Teignmouth is situated on the coast of Devon, a peninsula of South West England. It has a mild maritime climate. Prevailing winds across the south-west of England are from the west. Teignmouth lies to the east of Dartmoor, in a lee / rainshadow, with mean temperatures 3 °C (5 °F) higher and less than 43% of the rainfall of Princetown, which is located on Dartmoor. It receives 133 millimetres (5.2 in) less precipitate per year than nearby Plymouth, which is located on the south-west coast of Devon.

Owing to its proximity to the sea, Teignmouth has warmer winters with less frost and snow, as well as slightly cooler summers compared with inland areas of southern England. January is usually the coldest month in Britain; however, sea temperatures usually reach their minimum temperature in late February, which affects Teignmouth's climate, making February its coldest month. The first frost in Teignmouth usually occurs in late November or early December.

Snow is rare during the start of the winter season in December. Late autumn and early winter is the wettest time of the year, because sea temperatures are still relatively high and deep Atlantic depressions bring moist air across the South West. On average, July is the driest month, but summer thunderstorms can occasionally deposit more than the month's mean rainfall in one day. Teignmouth has average daily sunshine totals of over seven hours in summer and around two hours in winter. Sunshine totals reflect the hours of daylight and the fluctuations of the Azores High, which is most powerful in summer. The climate patterns also implicate a less pronounced cooler Mediterranean climate (csa/ csb) influence which is due to the decrease in precipitation centred over the summer period and surplus rainfall during the winter.

The Teignmouth weather station is located in an area of the town exposed to sea breezes, resulting in lower temperature extremes compared to more sheltered parts of the town and surrounding area. Temperatures at the station have increased in every month between the 1981–2010 and 1991–2020 climate periods, with notable warming in spring and autumn, along with a small overall increase in rainfall during this time.

Climate data for Teignmouth 7m asl (1991–2020 normals, extremes 1910-2023)
Month	Jan	Feb	Mar	Apr	May	Jun	Jul	Aug	Sep	Oct	Nov	Dec	Year
Record high °C (°F)	16.2 (61.2)	16.5 (61.7)	18.8 (65.8)	22.4 (72.3)	26.1 (79.0)	29.4 (84.9)	29.4 (84.9)	29.4 (84.9)	27.8 (82.0)	24.9 (76.8)	18.9 (66.0)	17.2 (63.0)	29.4 (84.9)
Mean daily maximum °C (°F)	9.7 (49.5)	9.7 (49.5)	11.2 (52.2)	13.4 (56.1)	16.2 (61.2)	19.0 (66.2)	21.1 (70.0)	21.0 (69.8)	19.0 (66.2)	15.7 (60.3)	12.5 (54.5)	10.4 (50.7)	14.9 (58.8)
Daily mean °C (°F)	6.9 (44.4)	6.8 (44.2)	8.1 (46.6)	9.9 (49.8)	12.7 (54.9)	15.4 (59.7)	17.4 (63.3)	17.4 (63.3)	15.5 (59.9)	12.6 (54.7)	9.6 (49.3)	7.5 (45.5)	11.7 (53.1)
Mean daily minimum °C (°F)	4.2 (39.6)	3.8 (38.8)	5.0 (41.0)	6.5 (43.7)	9.1 (48.4)	11.8 (53.2)	13.7 (56.7)	13.8 (56.8)	11.9 (53.4)	9.6 (49.3)	6.6 (43.9)	4.6 (40.3)	8.4 (47.1)
Record low °C (°F)	−10.5 (13.1)	−7.8 (18.0)	−6.7 (19.9)	−2.1 (28.2)	0.2 (32.4)	2.1 (35.8)	7.2 (45.0)	5.6 (42.1)	1.2 (34.2)	−1.1 (30.0)	−3.9 (25.0)	−6.5 (20.3)	−10.5 (13.1)
Average precipitation mm (inches)	96.6 (3.80)	73.3 (2.89)	67.2 (2.65)	60.6 (2.39)	53.6 (2.11)	55.0 (2.17)	46.0 (1.81)	62.5 (2.46)	57.1 (2.25)	101.9 (4.01)	98.2 (3.87)	101.3 (3.99)	873.2 (34.38)
Average precipitation days (≥ 1.0 mm)	13.1	11.2	9.9	9.9	8.6	8.0	7.3	9.2	7.8	12.5	13.1	13.4	124.1
Mean monthly sunshine hours	64.1	86.8	127.8	186.0	216.0	220.4	219.5	200.2	162.0	114.3	80.8	59.2	1,737.2
Source 1: Met Office
Source 2: Starlings Roost Weather

== Buildings ==
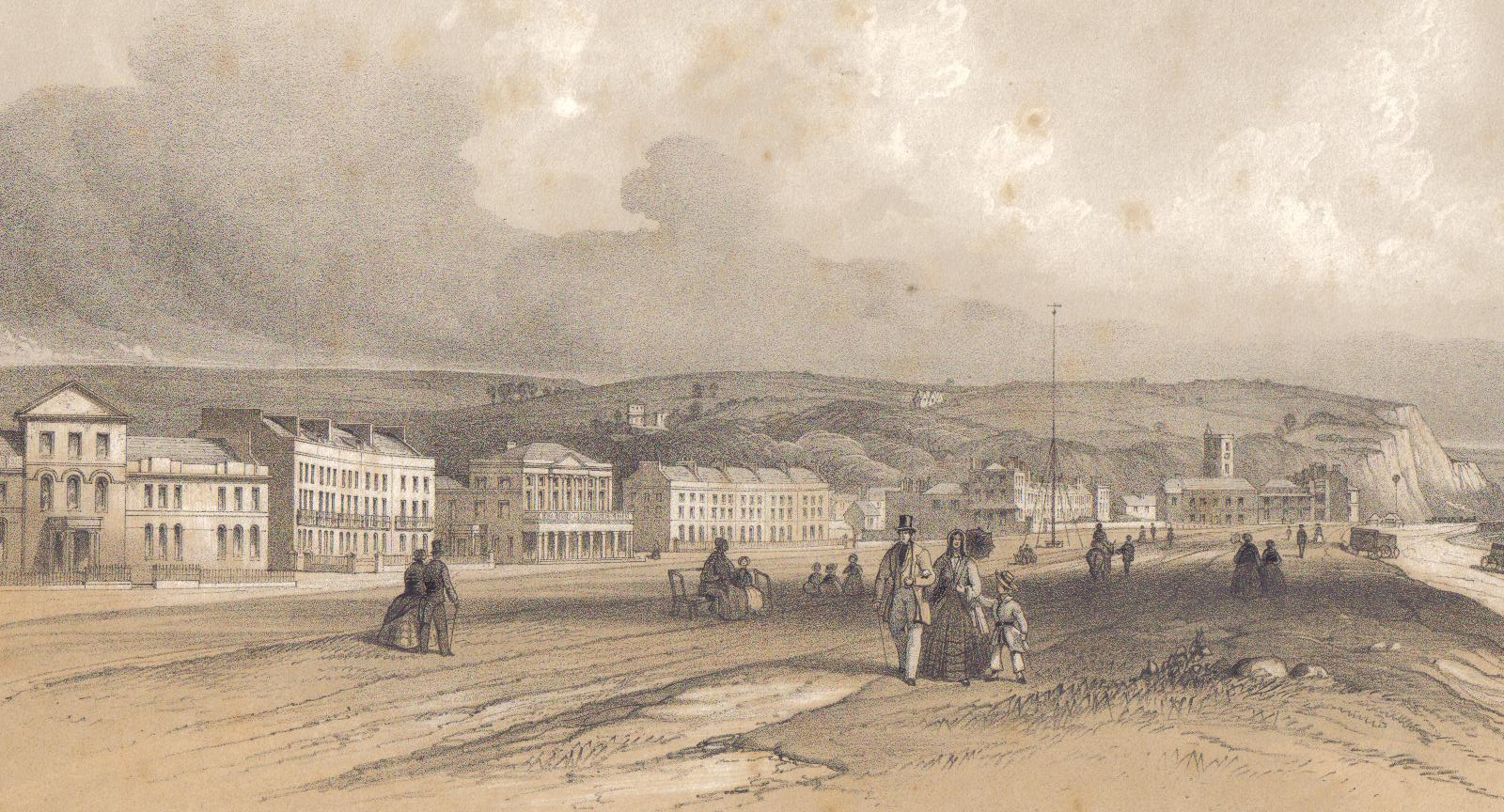
The esplanade with Den Crescent and the Assembly Rooms behind (c.1860)

Den Crescent and its central Assembly Rooms, laid out in 1826 by Andrew Patey of Exeter, still survive relatively unchanged today. The Assembly Rooms were the hub of the town's social life in the 19th century and lavish balls took place in the 70 ft (21 m) long ballroom. In 1871, the building was taken over by the East Devon and Teignmouth Club which had an exclusive membership taken from the gentry and professional middle class.

Over the years, the building was used as a theatre, a dance hall, a conference centre and a billiards hall. In 1934 it was converted into the Riviera Cinema, in which guise it continued until 2000; part of the building has now been converted into flats. In 2016, the lease for the historic auditorium was taken over by the Mars Hill Church, with the intention of restoring it as both a cinema and a music and arts facility.

The town's parish church, dedicated to St. James, is unusual, being octagonal in shape. (Note: Another example of this rare church design is now called Dreghorn and Springside Parish Church (formerly Dreghorn and Perceton) in North Ayrshire, Scotland.) A story from Cornwall suggests why these churches are rounded, for the villagers of Veryan built several circular houses so that the Devil had no corners in which to lie in wait for unsuspecting occupants and these buildings were therefore 'Devil-proof.' The church of St Michael the Archangel is in the east of the town. St. Scholastica's Abbey (now converted to flats), on the road to Dawlish, built in 1864 by Henry Woodyer is a notable Gothic Revival building, and the Roman Catholic Church, on the same road, is a late work by Joseph Hansom, the inventor of the hansom cab.

In 1894, there were 26 public houses in Teignmouth. Pubs today include the Blue Anchor Inn on Teign Street and the Devon Arms on Northumberland Place.

The River Beach is home to a varied selection of seasonal and permanent beach huts, one of which (now removed to the town's museum) was a Georgian bathing machine, minus wheels. These huts have enjoyed the boom in popularity of such properties in recent years and now change hands for figures upwards of £100,000.

Teignmouth and Shaldon museum was completed in 2011. It comprises an architecturally iconic extension of the existing 18th century museum building, with new roof terrace looking over the town, glass tower and community facility. Some of the exhibits include a restored bathing machine; artefacts from the Church Rock wreck, such as cannons; exhibits from the nearby Haldon aerodrome, plus film footage including The Beatles' visit to the town and the 2009 homecoming concerts by Muse. The new build cost almost £1.1m; it was enabled by a major community fund-raising effort, in combination with Lottery and UK government funding and other sources, such as local grant funders and Devon County Council. The Church Rock wreck was found when a Zuanne Alberghetti cannon was located on the site of a 16th-century wreck, followed by further discoveries.

The town's newest public building is the Pavilions Teignmouth, a community arts and enterprise centre on the Den, opened in April 2016.

== Tourism ==
Although reduced from its heyday, Teignmouth still receives considerable numbers of holidaymakers, especially day-trippers. It is twinned with the French town Perros-Guirec.

The resort has a sea beach and Teignmouth Pier, with amusement arcade and rides. The beach wraps around the spit at the head of the river Teign, providing a river beach commonly known as the Back Beach on the estuary side; this overlooks the harbour with its moorings for many pleasure craft and has views up the estuary to Dartmoor. An 18-mile (29 km) long waymarked route, known as the Templer Way, has been created between Haytor on Dartmoor and Shaldon. It closely follows the route of George Templer's granite tramway, his father James's Stover Canal and finally the estuary to Teignmouth.

Teignmouth Carnival is held during the last week of July, with the procession on the last Thursday. Since 1999, the town has hosted a summer folk festival. In 2005, Fergus O'Byrne and Jim Payne from Newfoundland, were the 'headline' artists at that year's festival which celebrated the town's links with that region.

In 2014, Teignmouth and Dawlish Community Interest Group commissioned a website to promote the town to tourists visiting.

Since 2018, Teignmouth has hosted the annual Teign Shanty Festival; it is a folk music festival with a focus on sea shanties, with over 40 groups performing in 2021.

== Schools ==
The main schooling presence in the town is that of the Ivy Education Trust, which has a primary, secondary and sixth form there. The primary school is known simply as Teignmouth Primary School; this was previously known as Teignmouth Community School, Mill Lane and before this was known as Inverteign.

Incorporating a sixth form college, the main secondary school is Teignmouth Community School, stylised sometimes as Teignmouth Secondary. Formerly Teignmouth High School, then Teignmouth Community College, it was created as a merger in 1979 of Teignmouth Grammar School, which occupied the Westlawn and Winterbourne buildings of the school, and Teignmouth Secondary Modern School. More recently, it has merged further with Inverteign Community Nursery and Primary School.

Also present in the town is Trinity School, which is independent with a preparatory department and boarding facilities, for children from ages 2 to 18. It was formerly known as The Convent of Notre Dame.

Other primary schools include Our Lady & St Patrick (Roman Catholic) and Hazeldown.

== Media ==
Local TV coverage is provided by BBC South West and ITV West Country. Television signals are received from the Beacon Hill and Stockland Hill TV transmitters and from one of the two local relay transmitters, depending on which part of the town (Teignmouth and Coombe).

Local radio stations are BBC Radio Devon on 104.3 FM, Heart West on 96.4 and 103 FM Greatest Hits Radio Devon on 105.5 FM, Radio Exe Devon on 107.3 FM and East Devon Radio, a community based station which broadcast on 106.4 FM.

The town is served by the local newspaper, Teignmouth Post, a sub-edition of the Mid Devon Advertiser, which publishes on Fridays.

== Sport ==
The town is the home of Teignmouth A.F.C., whose first team currently play in the South West Peninsula League and reserves play in the South Devon League Division Two.

It is also the home of Teignmouth R.F.C. with the 1st XV playing in the South West 1 league.

The Den Bowling Club situated on the sea front is the home of the Teignmouth Open Bowls Tournament.

Teignmouth Shotokan Karate Club was established in 1984 and trains twice weekly at the Teign Heritage Centre and Pavilions Teignmouth.

The seafront benefits from Teignmouth Lido, a public open-air heated swimming pool. This is one of four outdoor pools operated by Teignbridge District Council. The others are at Buckfastleigh, Ashburton and Buckland.

Teignmouth is home to the River Teign Rowing club, the largest rowing club in the UK with almost 400 members; it competes internationally in Cornish Pilot Gig rowing, locally racing Seine boats and nationally in Sea Skiffs and Sculls. Members have competed recently as far afield as Russia.

Teign Corinthian Yacht Club was founded in 1886; it organises racing and training for sailing dinghies, yachts and powerboats. It has two centres: a clubhouse on Teignmouth seafront built in 1995 and a dinghy park on the River Teign estuary at Coombe Cellars, with a new clubhouse being built there in 2020.

Bitton Park (Teignmouth) Bowling Club (est. 1940) sits beside the Town Council offices at Bitton House with easily accessible public parking. The club is well represented in the local bowling leagues and co-hosts the annual Teignmouth Open Bowls Tournament. All levels of bowler are welcome from complete beginners to keen competitors.

== Notable people ==
Fanny Burney (1752–1840), the diarist and novelist, visited Teignmouth several times in the late 18th century. She took her first dip in the sea here in 1773, as she recorded in her journal. Elias Parish Alvars (1808–1849), the harpist, was born in East Teignmouth. Thomas Abel Brimage Spratt (1811–1888), vice-admiral, hydrographer and geologist, was born at Woodway House.

In spring 1818, the poet John Keats (1795–1821), spent several weeks in Teignmouth and completed his epic poem Endymion here. His arrival coincided with a period of wet weather and he wrote to a friend of "the abominable Devonshire Weather ... the truth is, it is a splashy, rainy, misty, snowy, foggy, haily, floody, muddy, slipshod county."

George O. May (1875–1961), who made significant contributions to the field of accounting and rose to senior partner of Price Waterhouse's American firm in the early 20th century, was born and raised in Teignmouth.

From 1812 until he died, Edward Pellew, 1st Viscount Exmouth (1757–1833), the Royal Navy officer and politician, had his home at Bitton House, which was then called West Cliff House. Meanwhile, Thomas Luny (1759–1837), the painter of seascapes, lived in the town for thirty years until he died and executed over 2,200 paintings while living here. Shortly afterwards George Hennet (1799–1857), the railway engineer and contractor who was closely involved with Brunel's railway, moved to the town and took a close interest in local affairs. He died locally.

Charles Babbage (1791–1871), the mathematician, philosopher, inventor and mechanical engineer, who originated the idea of a programmable computer, also lived here for some years and was married in St Michael's church in the town.

Sir John Smyth (1893–1983), the Indian Army officer and MP, and recipient of the Victoria Cross was made 1st Baronet of Teignmouth in 1956. The Belgium footballer Charles Vanden Wouwer (1916–1989) was born in Teignmouth, while his parents were staying there as World War I refugees.

The Canadian Second World War pilot Roy Sydney Baker-Falkner (1916–1944) settled in the Teignmouth area in 1930, his brother and sister studying in Teignmouth whilst he was a cadet at the Royal Naval College, Dartmouth. He went on to be one of the few naval pilots of the Battle of Britain, was a test pilot and given the freedom of Teignmouth and Exeter after leading the audacious attack on the German battleship Tirpitz. He is remembered on the Shaldon War Memorial and at the Teign Heritage – Teignmouth & Shaldon Museum.

During the Second World War, Clive Sinclair (1940–2021), the English entrepreneur and inventor, was evacuated to Teignmouth as a child and lived there for some years. The businessman and musician Danny Thompson (1939–2025) was born in the town, and the writer and environmentalist John Bainbridge (born 1953) spent his teens and early adulthood here and was educated at West Lawn School. The Norman Wisdom (1915–2010) film, Press for Time, in which Norman becomes a reporter at the seaside town of Tinmouth, was shot largely on location in Teignmouth in 1966. A bus and bicycle chase shows many scenes of the town centre and sea front, as it was at the time.

In October 1968, Donald Crowhurst (1932–1969), competing in the Sunday Times Golden Globe Race, started his ill-fated attempt to sail round the world single-handed from the town. His boat was a trimaran named the Teignmouth Electron after the town and his electronics company. The town featured in the film of this event, The Mercy, released in 2018, starring Colin Firth (born 1960) and Rachel Weisz (born 1970).

The three members of rock band Muse (Matt Bellamy (born 1978), Chris Wolstenholme (born 1978) and Dominic Howard) (born 1977) attended Teignmouth Community College in the early 1990s. They formed the band in the town in 1994 and based their song "Falling Down" on their teenage years living there. The band performed two homecoming concerts entitled A Seaside Rendezvous there in September 2009.

Singer-songwriter Patrick Wolf (born 1983) wrote a song called "Teignmouth" for his 2005 album Wind in the Wires, which focuses primarily on the view of the town and the River Teign when taking a train along the coastline. Laura Rossi (born 1975), the composer of film and concert works, grew up in Teignmouth and attended school in the town.

England rugby union and Exeter Chiefs player Sam Simmonds (born 1994) lives in Teignmouth, as does his brother and fellow first team player Joe Simmonds (born 1996). Sam helped the Chiefs win the Aviva Premiership in 2017. He has currently scored two tries for England and has one Man of the Match award.

The triple jump world record holder, Jonathan Edwards (born 1966), lived in Teignmouth in his early years. He went to school at the Inverteign Juniors site (now Mill Lane). His world record has stood since 1995.

== In art and literature ==
Letitia Elizabeth Landon's poetical illustration A Legend of Teignmouth, in Fisher's Drawing Room Scrap Book of 1834, accompanies an engraving of a view of Teignmouth from the Ness by Thomas Allom.
