= Ernest McChesney =

American opera singer

Ernest McChesney (July 22, 1912 – July 25, 1991) was an American tenor who had an active singing career in operas, musicals, and concerts during the late 1920s through the early 1960s. He was notably a principal tenor with the New York City Opera from 1954 to 1960.

== Biography ==
McChesney began his career as a teenager appearing in the ensembles of the original Broadway productions of My Maryland (1927) and The New Moon (1928). This was followed by a small supporting role in Princess Charming in 1930. His first major break came the following year when he became one of the featured performers in the Ziegfeld Follies.

McChesney made his professional opera debut in July 1933 with the Central City Opera as Danilo in Franz Lehár's The Merry Widow He performed periodically in concerts, operas, and operettas throughout the United States during the 1930s while receiving more formal training at Syracuse University. In 1934 and 1935 he sang roles with the Pittsburgh Civic Light Opera. He also sang on the radio many times in the 1930s. On October 17, 1937 he sang the role of Abel in the world premiere of Louis Gruenberg's Green Mansions with CBS radio. In 1938 he graduated from Syracuse with a Bachelor of Music degree.

In 1940 McChesney was the tenor soloist in Beethoven's Symphony No. 9 with the Minneapolis Symphony and conductor Dimitri Mitropoulos. In 1941 he made his New York City recital debut at Town Hall. In 1942 McChesney graduated from the University of Michigan with a master's degree in vocal performance. Shortly thereafter he returned to Broadway to portray Eisenstein in Rosalinda, an adaptation of Die Fledermaus. In 1943 he was the tenor soloist in Bach's Mass in B Minor with the Bach Choir of Bethlehem and the Philadelphia Orchestra at the Bethlehem Bach Festival. McChesney was also a repeat performer with NYC's New Opera Company during the early 1940s.

In 1946 McChesney sang for the first time with the Boston Symphony Orchestra as the tenor soloist in Beethoven's Ninth Symphony. The following year he returned to Broadway for the last time to portray Major Alexius Apieidoff in the acclaimed revival of The Chocolate Soldier. In 1949–1950 he toured the United States with the Charles L. Wagner Opera Company singing Canio in Pagliacci, and appeared with Lyric Theatre in Houston in "The New Moon," subsequently touring in "The Chocolate Soldier" with Ann Ayers. In 1951 he sang the B minor Mass with the Oratorio Society of New York. In 1956 he portrayed Pandarus in the United States premiere of William Walton's Troilus and Cressida at the San Francisco Opera.

On March 25, 1954 McChesney made his debut with the New York City Opera as Herod in Richard Strauss's Salome with Phyllis Curtin in the title role. He sang with the company for the next six years in a variety of roles, including Eisenstein, Malcolm in Macbeth, and William Marshall in Marc Blitzstein's Regina. In 1959 he portrayed "the Director" in the world premiere of Hugo Weisgall's Six Characters in Search of an Author. His last role with the NYCO was the title role in Stravinsky's Oedipus rex in 1960.

McChesney retired from the stage in the early 1960s, after which he taught for many years on the voice faculty of the Manhattan School of Music. "Mac" spent 1966–1967 teaching voice at Yale University, substituting for Jack Litten who was on sabbatical in Germany. In 1974 his wife of many years, Jean McChesney (née Everly) died. Ernest died seventeen years later in Ocean City, New Jersey.
