= Genevieve (actress) =

French actress (1920–2004)

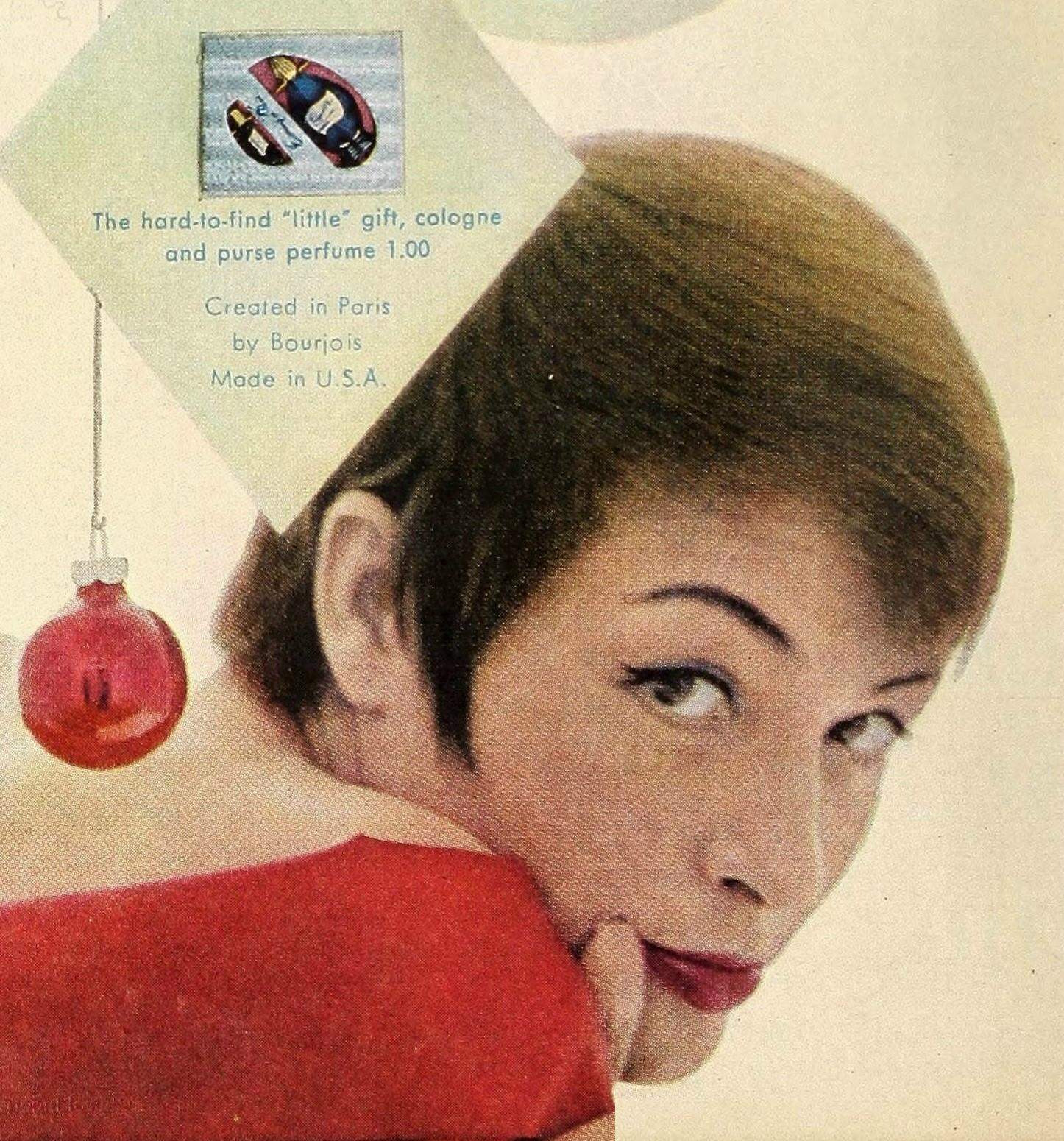
- Genevieve, in a 1960 perfume advertisement
- Born: Ginette Marguerite Auger; April 17, 1920; Paris, France
- Died: March 14, 2004 (aged 83); Los Angeles, California, U.S.
- Occupations: Actress, comedian, singer
- Relatives: Alley Mills (stepdaughter)

Ginette Marguerite Auger (April 17, 1920 – March 14, 2004) was a French comedian, actress and singer best remembered for her regular appearances on Tonight Starring Jack Paar and The Jack Paar Show in the 1950s and early 1960s.

== Biography ==
Born and raised in Paris, Genevieve owned and performed at Chez Geneviève, a nightclub in Montmartre, from 1949 to 1954. She was discovered there by an American talent agent in 1954 and brought to New York as a cabaret and supper-club singer. Her mangled use of spoken English caused her to transition into a more comic persona. Following the end of Paar's program in 1965, her career receded. Her final credited appearance was in the 1980 television miniseries Scruples.

Genevieve married writer, director and producer Ted Mills in 1960. Her stepdaughter Alley Mills later starred in the television series Wonder Years. Her husband died in 2003, and Genevieve died in 2004 in Venice, California, at the age of 83, from complications following a stroke.
