= Shoalstone Pool =

Seawater swimming pool in Devon, England

Coordinates: 50.401233°N 3.498759°W

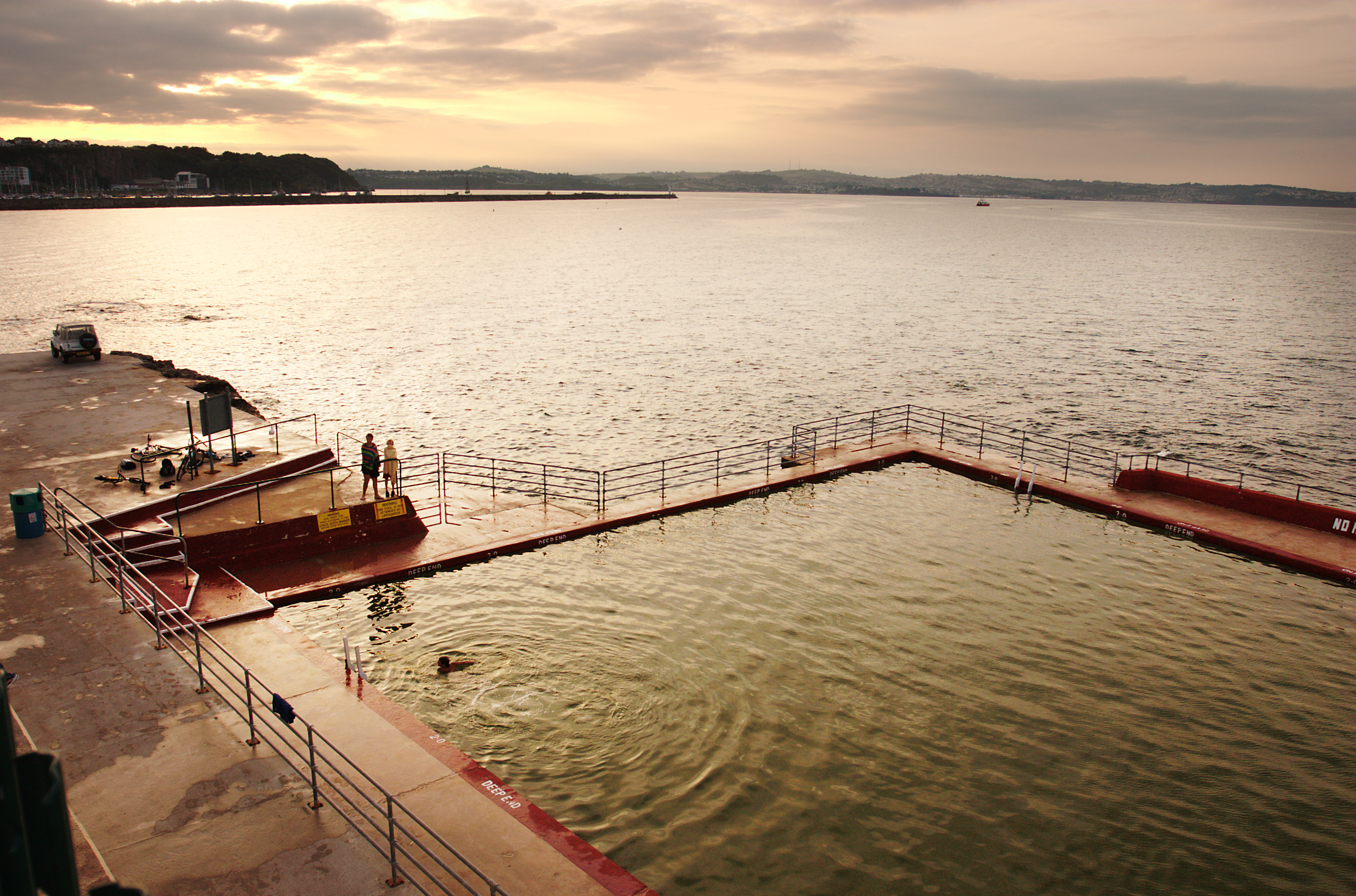
- Shoalstone lido in 2007
- Interactive map of Shoalstone Pool
- Dimensions: Length: 53 metres

Construction
- Opened: 1896

Website
- http://shoalstonepool.com/

Shoalstone Pool is a sea-water swimming pool or lido on Shoalstone Beach, Brixham, Devon.

== Description ==
This pool is the English Riviera's only open air 50m sea-water swimming pool. The pool is used by local families and schools in the area. There are excellent views across Torbay at high tide.

The swimming season is May–September during which it has lifeguards on duty from 10am to 6pm. There is no charge for swimming. The pool is managed by Shoalstone Pool CIO and supported by the Friends of Shoalstone Pool.

Shoalstone Pool is an outdoor 53 metre sea water swimming pool situated in a stunning position on Brixham sea front. The pool is one of only a few left in the country.

The pool is funded from donations, grants, fund-raising, sponsorship, advertising on site, car park revenue and the hire charges for beach huts and beach furniture.

Shoalstone Pool is much used by local people and is very popular with tourists. The number of visitors per year depends upon the weather but several thousand people use the pool each year, mainly, of course, between May and September. The pool is also available for hire to clubs and for parties.

== History ==
Shoalstone Pool is built into a natural rock pool that in Victorian times was popular for bathing. As a salt water pool, there is an abundant supply of water; however in 1896 two walls were built to retain the tidal water that flooded in.

In 2004 Torbay Council could no longer afford to support the pool. A public meeting was convened and a decision taken to create a working party to look at keeping the pool open. This subsequently became “The Friends of Shoalstone Pool” who worked with Torbay Council to maintain the pool thus reducing the cost to Torbay Council.

When setting its budget in 2014 Torbay Council drew up plans to close Shoalstone Pool. Following prolonged negotiations Brixham Town Council (“BTC”) entered into a lease under which Torbay Council leases Shoalstone Pool, together with the land and buildings surrounding the pool to BTC. Torbay Council remains the freeholder. Shoalstone Pool is managed on behalf of BTC by Shoalstone Pool CIO.
