= Carla Alberghetti =

Italian soprano singer

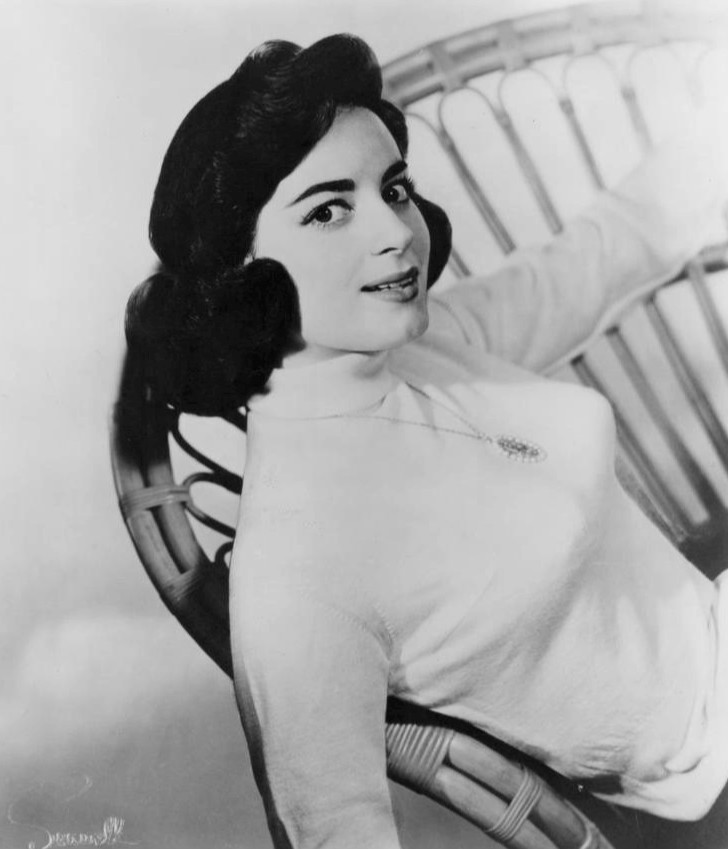
- Alberghetti in 1960
- Born: June 24, 1939 (age 86); Rhodes, Kingdom of Greece
- Occupations: Actress; singer
- Years active: 1955–present
- Relatives: Anna Maria Alberghetti (sister)

Carla Alberghetti (born 24 June 1939) is an Italian soprano singer. She was born on the Greek island of Rhodes.

Alberghetti made her singing debut at the Hollywood Bowl with the Los Angeles Philharmonic Orchestra in 1955, singing "Un bel di Vedremo" from Puccini's Madama Butterfly. In 1960 she appeared in a touring production of the musical Kismet opposite baritone Gordon MacRae.

Carla Alberghetti took over the role of Lili in Carnival from her older sister, Anna Maria Alberghetti, who had won a Tony Award as Best Actress (Musical) for the part, before it closed on Broadway in 1963, and took the show on the road, starring opposite Ed Ames and Ray Danton. In July 1961, she played Cinderella in the musical "Cinderella" at the Starlight theatre in Kansas City. The production was choreographed by Harding Dorn and the cast included Hal LeRoy, Joe Ross, Patti Karr, Mimi Randolph and Tommy Rall.

Alberghetti made guest appearances on The Ed Sullivan Show, Tonight Starring Jack Paar and The Tonight Show Starring Johnny Carson. She headlined at many nightclubs and resorts, including the Riviera, Tropicana and Harrah's in Las Vegas.
