= Anna Maria Alberghetti =

Italian–born American operatic singer and actress (born 1936)

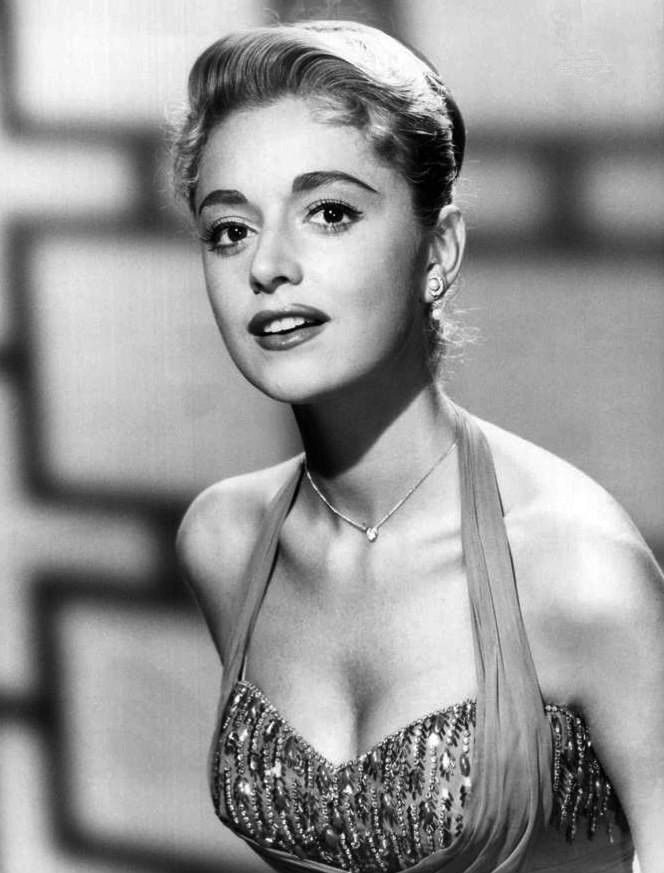
- Alberghetti in 1958
- Born: May 15, 1936 (age 90); Pesaro, Kingdom of Italy
- Occupations: Actress; singer
- Years active: 1942–present
- Spouse: Claudio Guzmán (m. 1964; div. 1974)
- Children: 2
- Relatives: Carla Alberghetti (sister)

Anna Maria Alberghetti (Italian: [ˈanna maˈriːa alberˈɡetti]; born May 15, 1936) is an Italian-American actress and soprano. Alberghetti sang in concert from the time she was a child and performed at Carnegie Hall at age 13.

Alberghetti began working in American films at age 15 with Frank Capra's 1951 musical Here Comes the Groom. She continued to act in film throughout the 1950s, before turning her focus to theater in the 1960s. In 1962, she won a Tony Award for Best Actress in a Musical for her performance in Carnival! Her stage work also included roles in Kismet, West Side Story, and Cabaret.

Alberghetti appeared on The Ed Sullivan Show more than 50 times.

== Biography ==
Alberghetti was born on May 15, 1936, in Pesaro, Marche, in central Italy. She starred on Broadway and won a Tony Award in 1962 as Best Actress (Musical) for Carnival! (she tied with Diahann Carroll for the musical No Strings).

Alberghetti was a child prodigy. Her father was an opera singer and concert master of the Rome Opera Company. Her mother was a pianist. At age six, Anna Maria sang in a concert on the Isle of Rhodes with a 100-piece orchestra. She performed at Carnegie Hall in New York at the age of 13. At 15, she was introduced to American film audiences in Frank Capra's 1951 musical Here Comes the Groom, which starred Bing Crosby. At 16, she was Red Skelton's opening act during his Sahara Hotel engagement in Las Vegas.

Her family's new life in the U.S. was aided by a Congressional bill, passed in August 1954, sponsored by Nevada senator Pat McCarran—because her father "admitted he had been an 'involuntary fascist'" during WWII.

Her younger sister, Carla, also became a musical artist, who appeared in many stage productions. She eventually became Anna Maria's replacement in her Tony Award-winning role on Broadway. She has a brother, Paul Alberghetti, who is an entertainment attorney and film producer. He is married to filmmaker Michele Noble.

== Professional career ==
Alberghetti appeared twice on the cover of Life magazine. She appeared on The Ed Sullivan Show more than 50 times. She guest-starred in 1957 on NBC's The Gisele MacKenzie Show. That same year, she performed in the premiere episode of The Pat Boone Chevy Showroom on ABC.

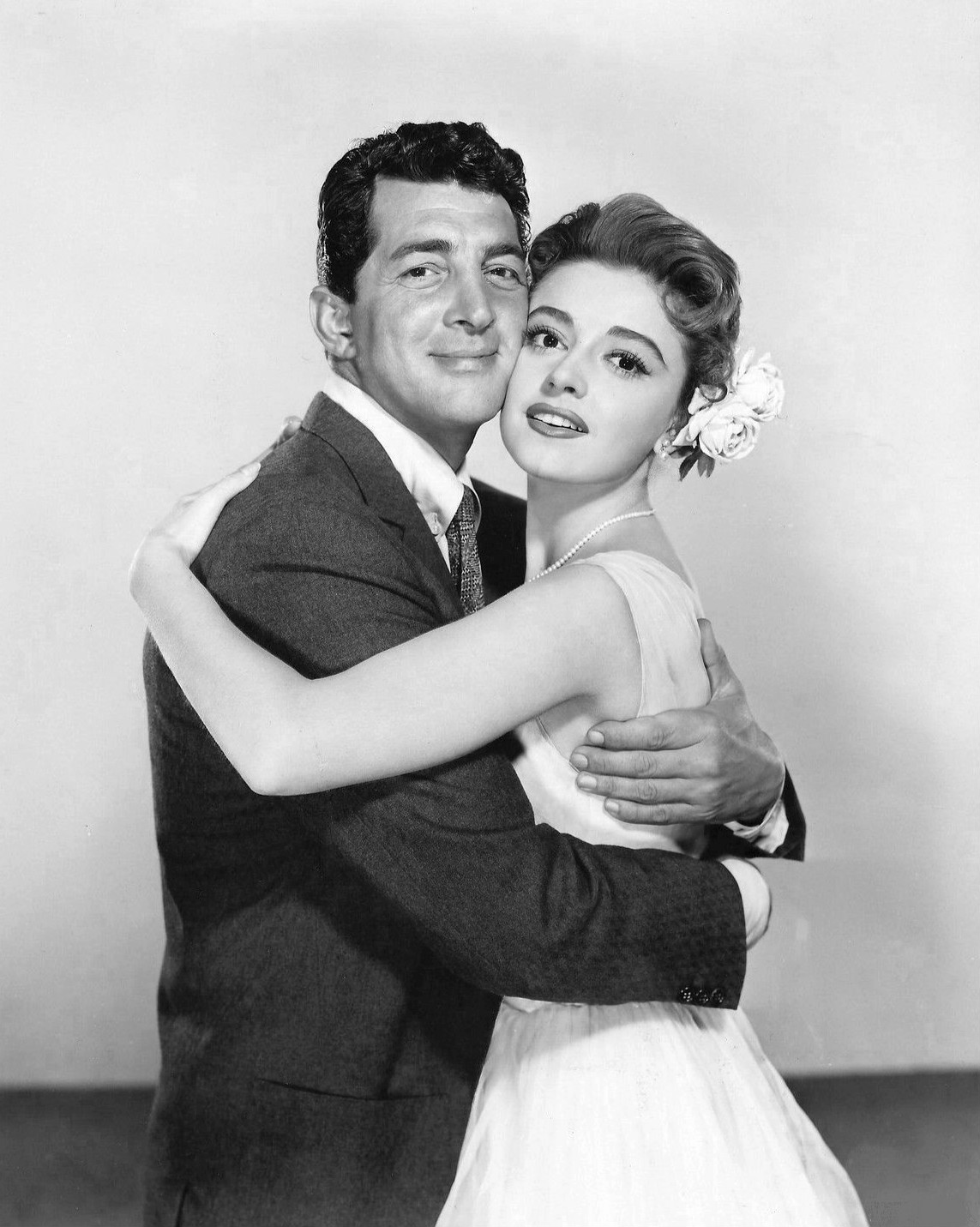
Alberghetti with Dean Martin in 1956

Alberghetti co-starred with Dean Martin in 1957's Ten Thousand Bedrooms and with Jerry Lewis in The Jazz Singer in 1959, and Cinderfella 1960, not long after the Martin and Lewis comedy team parted ways.

Alberghetti also appeared in 1955's The Last Command, which starred Sterling Hayden, and had the female lead in the Western Duel at Apache Wells in 1957.

In 1959, the 22-year-old Alberghetti played the lead in "The Conchita Vasquez Story" of NBC's Wagon Train. She was cast as part of a gang of Comancheros who intend to attack the wagon train to steal rifles headed to the United States Army. Instead, she decides to leave the Comancheros and move west after she falls in love with scout Flint McCullough, played by Robert Horton. Tragically, as the episode ends, Conchita is killed by a bullet from her own people when they ambush the wagon train.

On March 1, 1961, Alberghetti appeared as a guest contestant on the television series I've Got a Secret. She guest-starred on The Andy Williams Show on March 28, 1963 and performed on The Hollywood Palace variety program's episode of May 2, 1964.

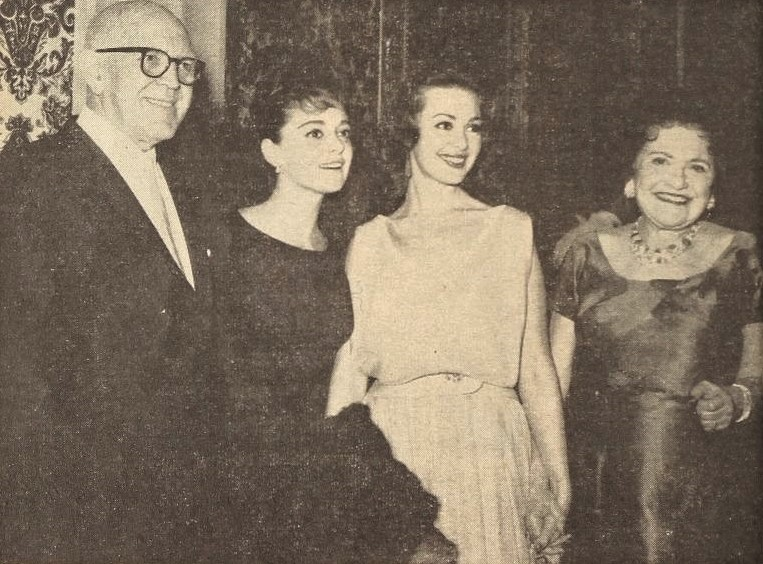
(L-R): Jimmy McHugh, Anna Maria Alberghetti, Barbara Rush and Louella Parsons in Modern Screen, 1960

Alberghetti appeared as a mystery guest on What's My Line on November 23, 1958. She appeared for a second mystery-guest appearance on April 30, 1961. In 1965, Alberghetti went on tour and performed on stage with Bob Hope in Okinawa for U.S. servicemen.

Alberghetti also appeared as herself in an episode of the comedy show Fractured Flickers, talking with the host Hans Conried.

Alberghetti has toured in many theatrical productions and continues with her popular one-woman cabaret act. She had roles in a pair of 2001 films: The Whole Shebang and Friends & Family.

Alberghetti appeared in television commercials for Good Seasons salad dressing mix during the 1970s and early 1980s, where she was cast as "The Good Seasons Lady".

There are some references to Alberghetti in the novel Rosemary's Baby by Ira Levin, amongst which, in one of Rosemary's dreams, she is seen, tiny, in the filigree silver ball on the Pope's ring. The author describes how Terry Gionoffrio, a fellow tenant in the Bramford, resembles Alberghetti. (Victoria Vetri in the film version).

== Personal life ==
Alberghetti became a U.S. citizen in 1961.

She was married to television producer-director Claudio Guzmán from 1964 to 1974. They had two children: Alexandra (b. 1966) and Pilar (b. 1970).

In a 2022 Vanity Fair article, Alberghetti gave an interview alleging incidents of the late comic actor Jerry Lewis sexually harassing her.

== Partial filmography ==
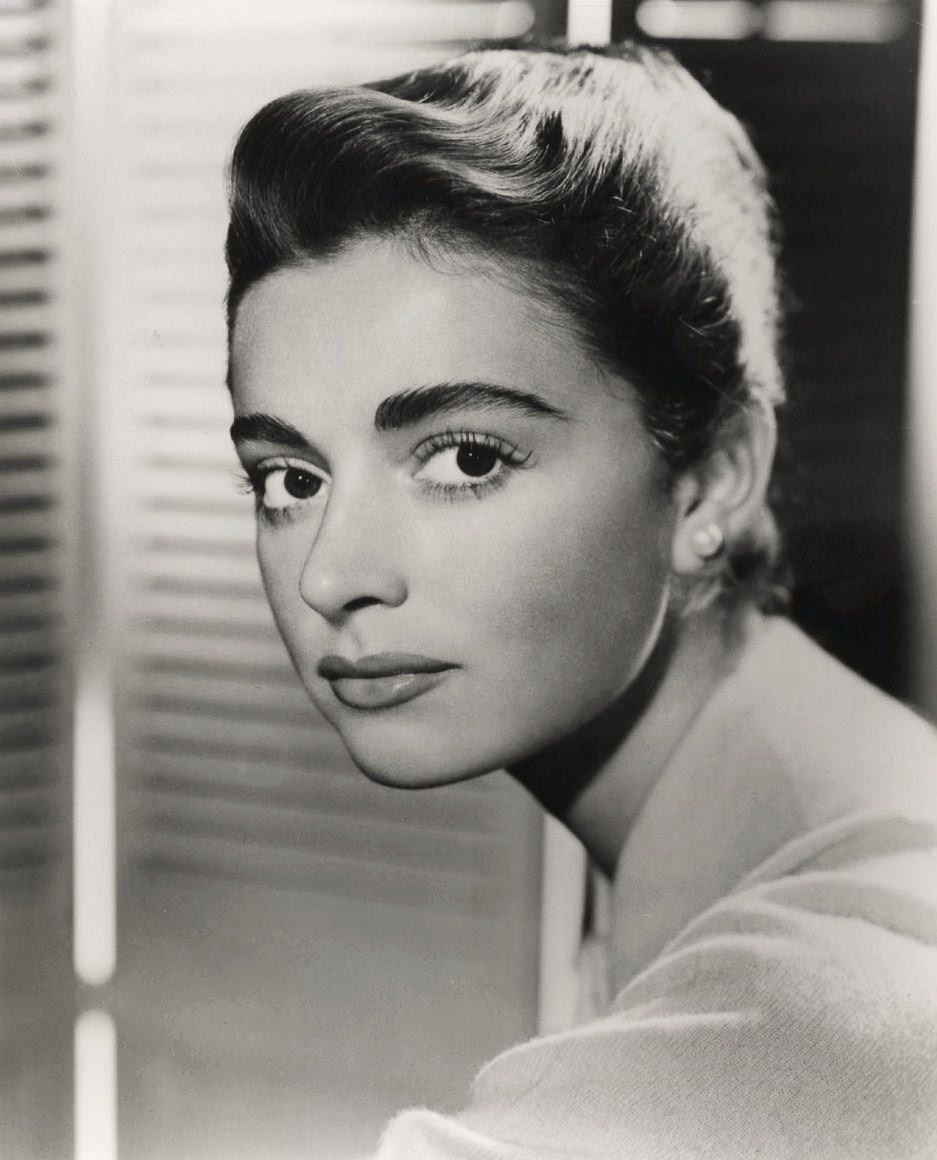
Alberghetti in 1959

| Year | Title | Role | Notes |
|---|---|---|---|
| 1951 | The Medium | Monica | |
| 1951 | Here Comes the Groom | Theresa | |
| 1953 | The Stars Are Singing | Katri Walenska | |
| 1955 | The Last Command | Consuelo de Quesada | |
| 1957 | Duel at Apache Wells | Anita Valdez | |
| 1957 | Ten Thousand Bedrooms | Nina Martelli | |
| 1959 | Wagon Train | Conchita Vasquez | Episode: 'The Conchita Vasquez Story' |
| 1960 | Cinderfella | Princess Charming | |
| 1967 | Kismet | Marsinah | TV movie |
| 2001 | Friends & Family | Stella Patrizzi | |
| 2001 | The Whole Shebang | Lady Zito | |

== Stage work ==
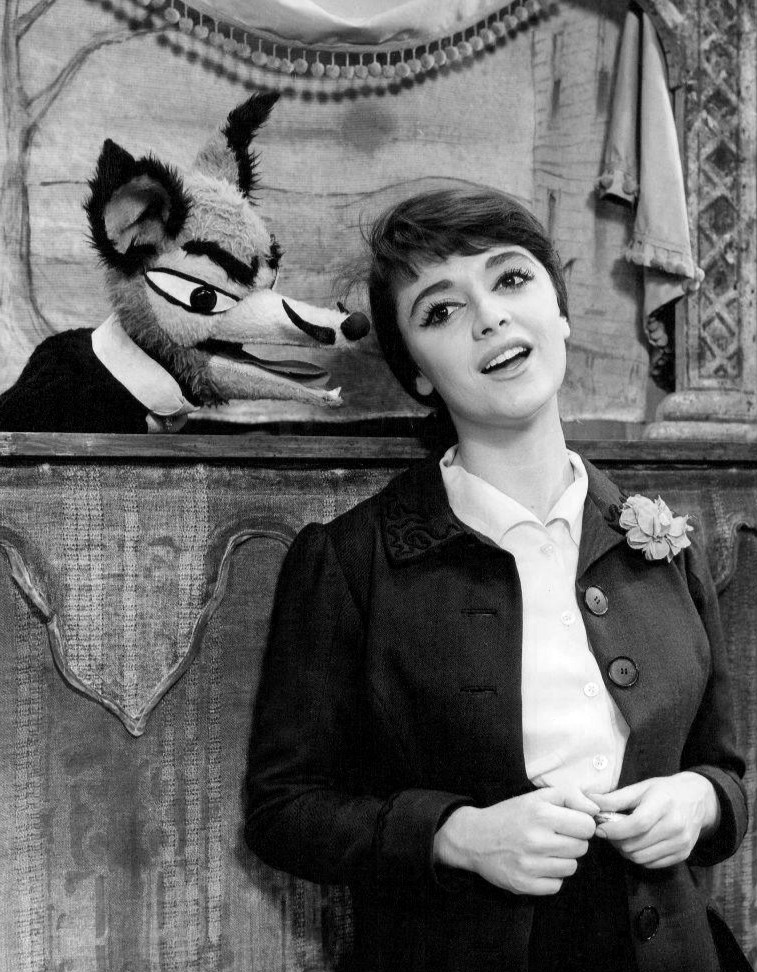
Alberghetti in Carnival!

- Rose-Marie (1960)
- Carnival! (1961)
- Fanny (1963; 1968)
- The Fantasticks (1968)
- West Side Story (1964)
- The Most Happy Fella (1969)
- Cabaret (1970)
- Kismet (1971)
- The Student Prince (1976)
- The Sound of Music (1978; 1985)
- Side by Side by Sondheim (1980)
- Camelot (1981)
- The Fabulous Palm Springs Follies (2000)
- Senior Class (2007)

== Discography ==
- Songs By Anna Maria Alberghetti (Mercury Records, 1955)
- I Can't Resist You (Capitol Records, 1957)
- Warm And Willing (Capitol Records, 1960)
- Love Makes The World Go Round (MGM Records, 1962)
- Merry Christmas from Anna Maria Alberghetti And Introducing Reino Moisio (Celebrity House, 1984)
