= Giovanni Alberghetti =

Italian sculptor

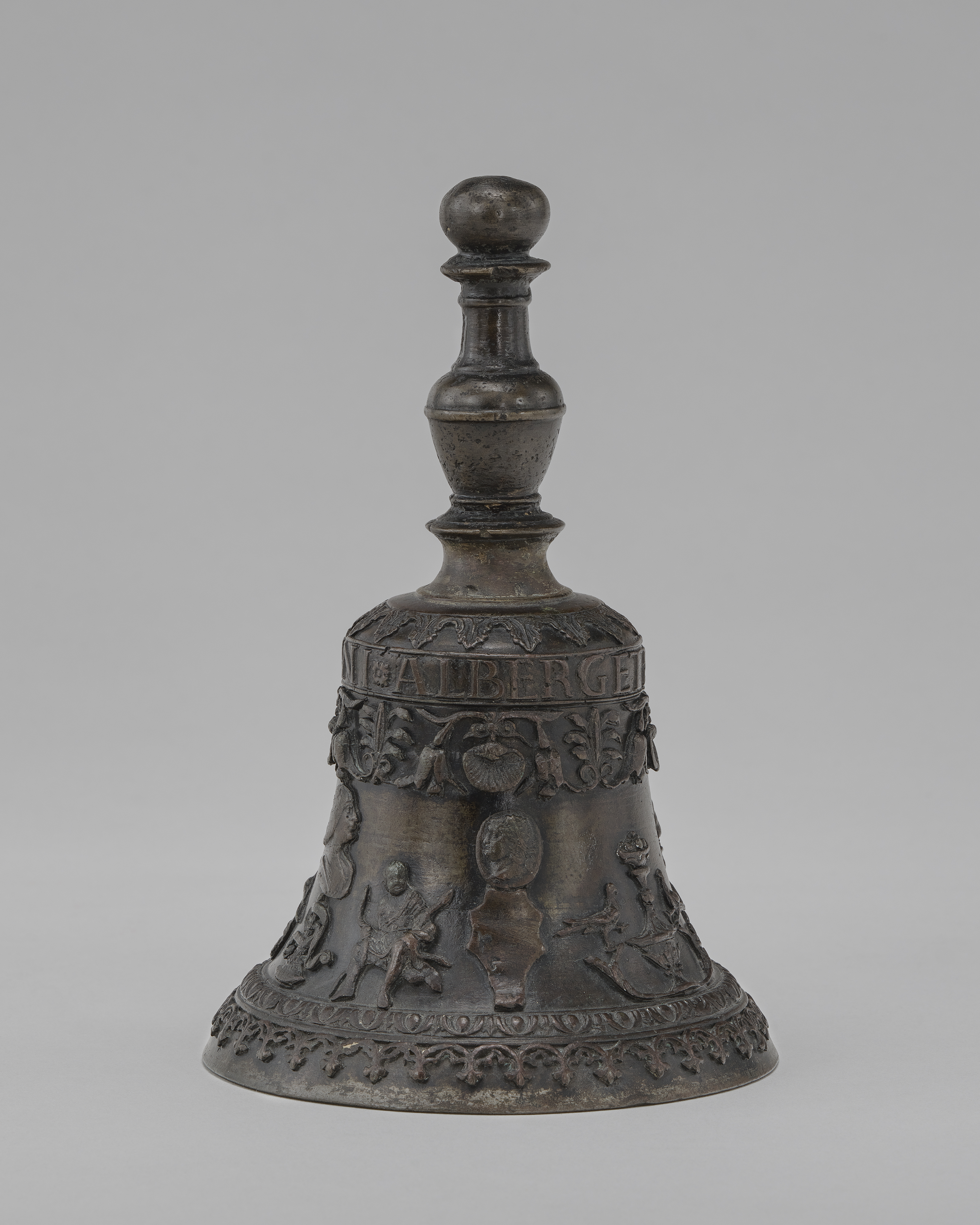
Table Bell with Portrait of Lodovico Maria Sforza, 1451-1508, called Il Moro, 7th Duke of Milan 1494-1508, bronze, in the collection of the National Gallery of Art

Giovanni Alberghetti, also known as Giovanni Alberghetti the Elder, Zuanne or Zanin Alberghetti, (active c. 1491–1505), was an Italian Renaissance sculptor. His dates of birth and death are not known.

Alberghetti is known primarily through works in bronze attributed to him. He sculpted a bronze bowl that can be found at the Columbia Museum of Art. He also produced bronzes of God the Father and of the Virgin della Scarpa for the Cappella Zeno at San Marco.
