= St Thomas' Church, Exeter =

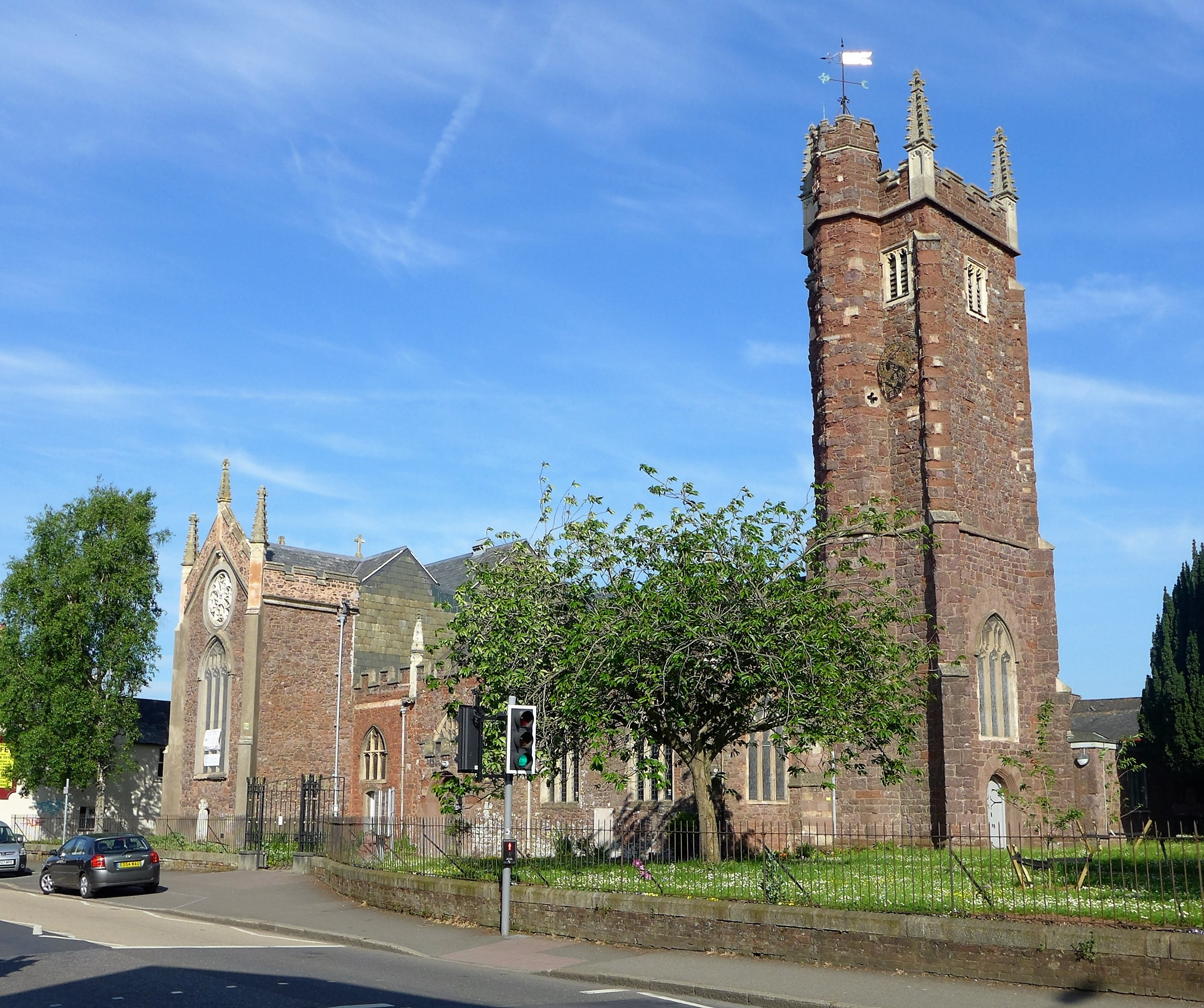
- St Thomas' Church in 2016

- Location within Devon
- 50.71578°N 3.54218°W,
- OS grid reference: SX 91222 91818
- Country: England
- Denomination: Church of England

History
- Status: Operational
- Dedication: St Thomas

Architecture
- Heritage designation: Grade I listed
- Architect: John Hayward (architect)
- Style: Gothic and Gothic Revival
- Years built: Medieval with 19th century restoration

Specifications
- Materials: Limestone and Heavitree stone

Administration
- Province: Canterbury
- Diocese: Exeter
- Archdeaconry: Exeter
- Parish: St Thomas, Exeter

St Thomas' Church in Exeter, Devon, is a parish church in the Church of England. It is a Grade I listed building.

== History ==
Originally the site of a 13th-century chapel by Cowick Priory, a church here was consecrated in 1412 but was burnt down in 1645 in the English Civil War. This was rebuilt by 1657. The east end was enlarged by Andrew Patey between 1829 and 1830. Restorations were carried out by John Hayward in 1871.

The building's listing describes its transepts as 'impressive examples of pre-Victorian Gothic', and describes the tower as 'an important example of Gothic survival in the post-Reformation period'.

The wooden lectern was brought to the church from Exeter Cathedral circa 1840. It dates from the 14th century and is the earliest surviving cathedral lectern.

The royal arms at the west end of the church date from 1682.

== Memorials ==
There is a late medieval-style canopied table tomb to Christina Medley (died 1845) by the London sculptor John Bacon the Younger, who was her father.

In the north aisle is an 1838 family pew for the Graves-Sawle family.

The largest of the many wall monuments is to Thomas Northmore.

== Current day ==
The church hosts a number of community groups and events.
