= Andrew Patey =

English architect

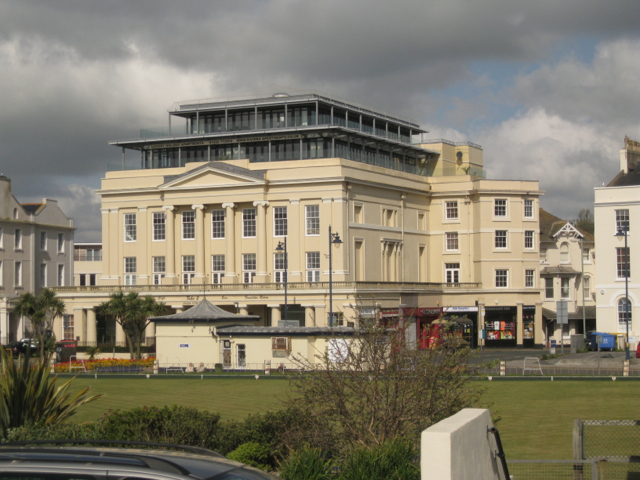
Former Assembly Rooms, Teignmouth 1826

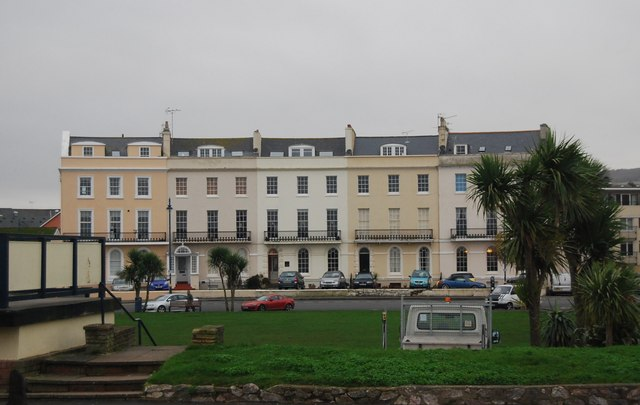
Den Crescent, Teignmouth 1825

Andrew Patey (died 1834) was an English architect based in Exeter.

== Life ==
He began life as a mason in Yorkshire. Later he established himself as an architect in Exeter and by 1830 was based at Upper Sidwell Street.

He married Margaret Bunn (ca. 1782 - 18 Jan 1858), daughter of William Bunn on 17 May 1826 in Wickham Market, Suffolk. They had the following children:

- Albert Samuel Patey (b. 19 July 1827)

He died on 2 September 1834 in Teignmouth.

== Works ==
- St James Church, Teignmouth 1821
- St Michael the Archangel's Church, Teignmouth 1821-23
- St Gregory's Church, Dawlish 1824-25
- St John the Baptist's Church, Church Road, Bishopsteignton 1825 (chancel enlargement)
- Assembly Rooms, Teignmouth 1826
- Den Crescent, Teignmouth 1825
- St Thomas' Church, Cowick Street, Exeter 1829-30 (new chancel)
- St Leonard's Church, Exeter 1831-33 (replaced 1876)
- West of England Fire Assurance Office, High Street, Exeter 1833 (destroyed in the Exeter Blitz 1942)
