= St Michael the Archangel's Church, Teignmouth =

St Michael’s Church, Teignmouth
- The church of St Michael the Archangel, Teignmouth
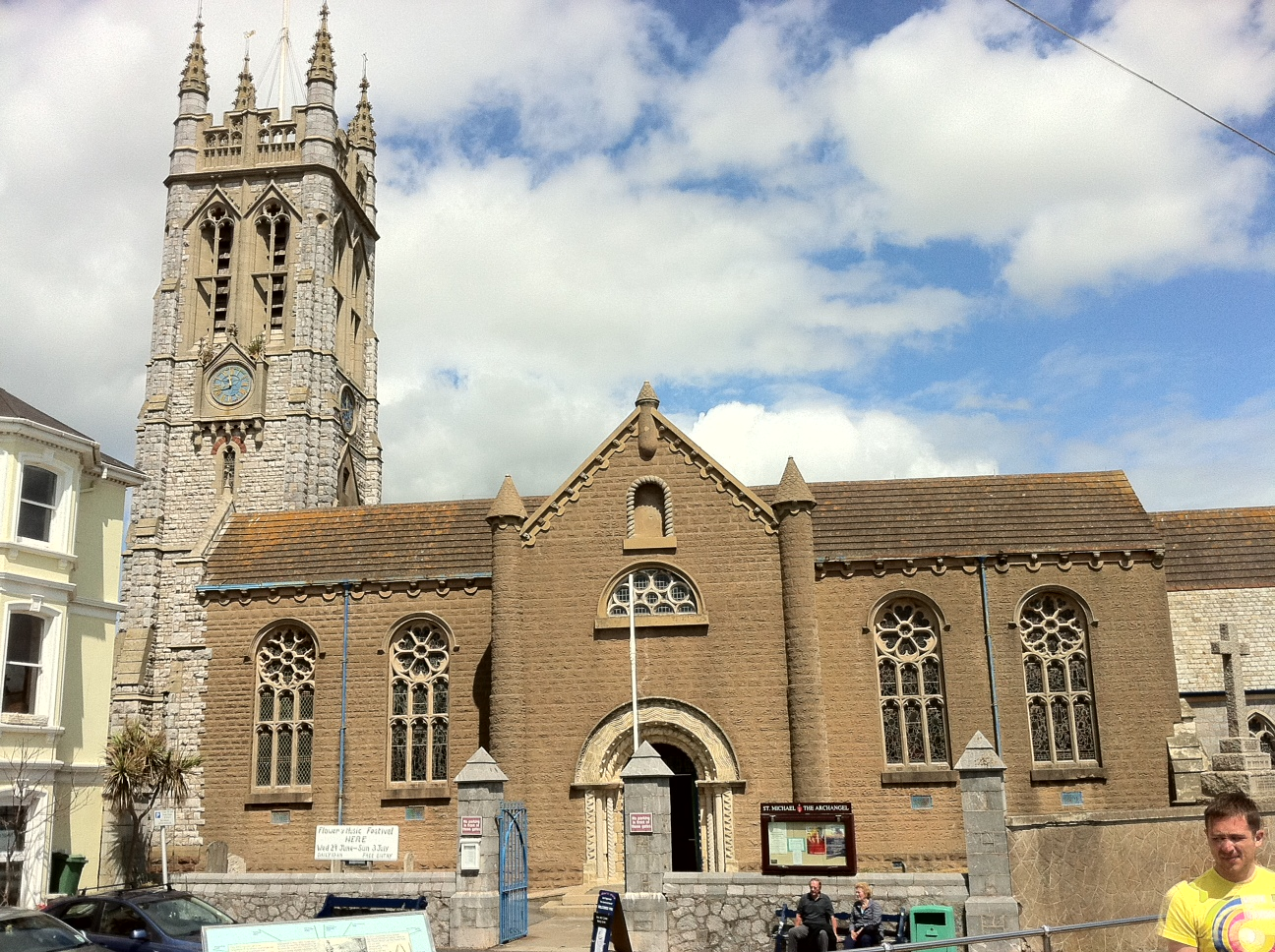
- St Michael’s Church, Teignmouth
- 50°32′50.2″N 3°29′31″W
- OS grid reference: SX 94380 73036
- Country: England
- Denomination: Church of England
- Website: www.haldonteam.org.uk

History
- Status: Active
- Dedication: St Michael the Archangel
- Consecrated: 21 October 1823

Architecture
- Heritage designation: Grade II listed
- Architect: Andrew Patey of Exeter.

Administration
- Diocese: Diocese of Exeter
- Archdeaconry: Archdeaconry of Totnes
- Deanery: Kenn
- Benefice: Teignmouth, Ideford with Luton, Ashcombe, Bishopsteignton and Shaldon
- Parish: Teignmouth

St Michael the Archangel's Church, Teignmouth is a Grade II listed Church of England parish church in Teignmouth, Devon.

== History ==
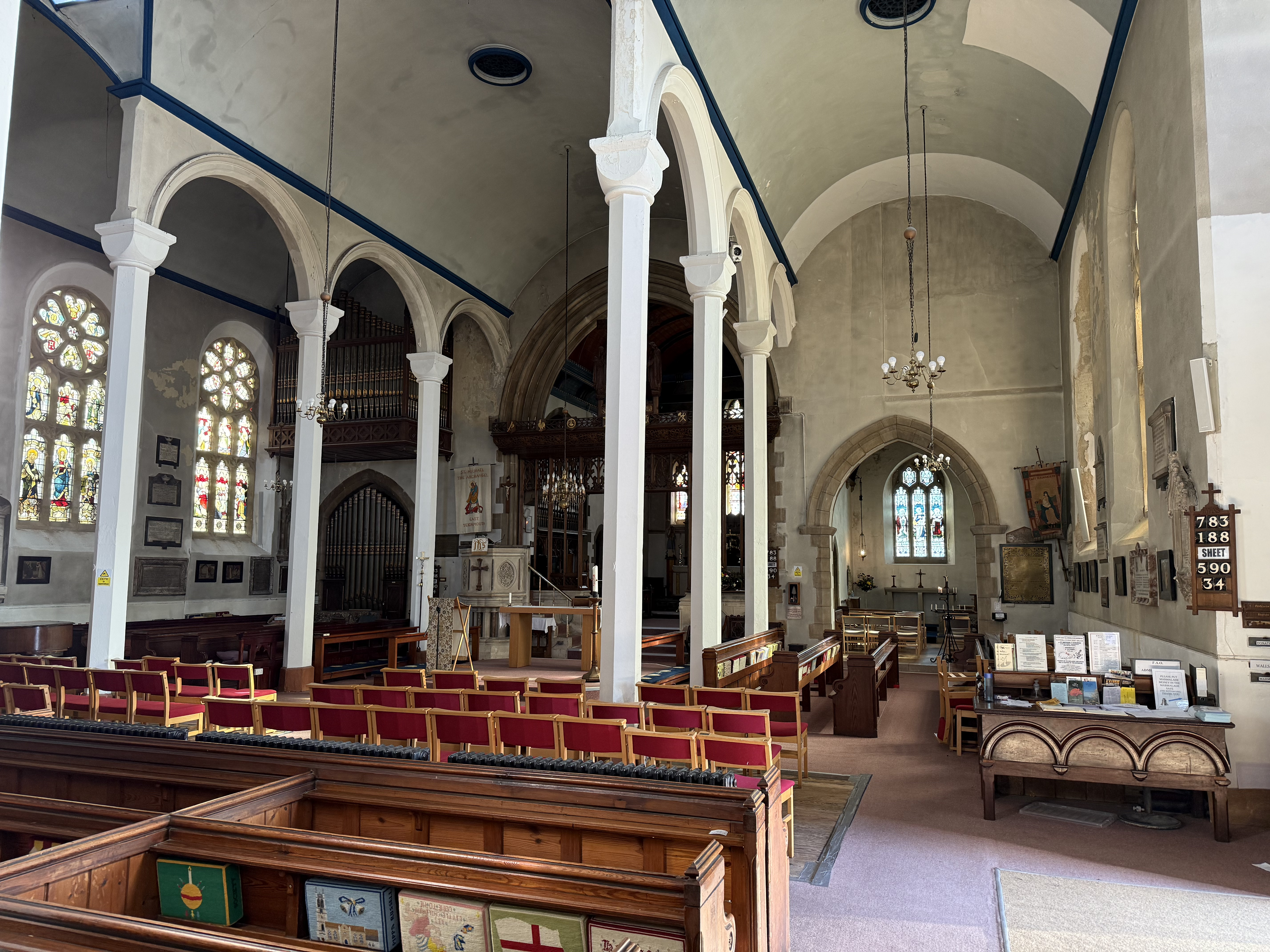
The interior of the church

The church was constructed between 1821 and 1823 to the designs of Andrew Patey of Exeter. It was consecrated by the Bishop of Exeter, Rt. Revd. William Carey on 21 October 1823.

The vestry was added in 1875, and the chancel by F.C. Deshon was added at the same time. More extensive works were delayed by lack of funds but by 1882 the interior had been reseated and the side galleries removed and a western gallery erected to retain the necessary accommodation for the congregation. Heating was provided with Hayden’s warming air apparatus. The arch near the tower was replaced with a new Bathstone drop arch. The walls and pillars were replastered and coloured and the ceiling was coloured in French grey. The floor was laid with cement to be covered with tiles.

The west tower in 1887 to 1889 by R.M. Fulford in the Early English style. It was known as the Jubilee Tower to mark the Golden Jubilee of Queen Victoria and erected at the cost of £2,500 (equivalent to £277,800 in 2025). It was built of lime stone, and dark red Kingsteignton stone. The western doorway included a figure of St Michael. The tower rose to a height of 111 feet (34 m) and on top was a flag pole 50 feet (15 m) in height.

The South Lady Chapel was added between 1923 and 1927 designed by Sir Charles Nicholson. It was dedicated by the Bishop of Exeter, Rt. Revd. Lord Rupert Ernest William Gascoyne-Cecil on 6 November 1927.

== Organ ==
An organ was installed in 1853 by Mr. Dicker. The organ was scheduled to be completed for a cost of £200, but as the full amount was not available, the organ was only partially completed, with Mr. Dicker agreeing to complete it when the remainder of the money was available.

The organ was found to be insufficient and a replacement was installed in a recess in the tower in 1859 by Robert Hamlin of Euston Road, London. It was paid for by H.A. Hoare and was said at the time to be the largest instrument in the West of England consisting of 36 speaking stops over three manuals and pedal board.

In 1881 the organ was moved to a newly constructed organ chamber and enlarged by Mr. Phillpotts of Exeter. Subsequent renovations have been carried out by Hele and Co in 1895 and 1970. A specification of the organ can be found on the National Pipe Organ Register.

=== Organists ===
- William Linter 1809 - 1854
- Edwin Linter 1854 - 1866 (son of the above)
- Charlotte E. Linter 1867 - 1913 (sister of the above)
- Arthur R. Trevithick 1914-1915 (formerly organist at St James’ Church, Exeter)
- Alfred H. Andrews 1914 - 1917 (temporary organist)
- Edwin Newcombe Tayler 1917 - 1920 (formerly organist of St Michael’s Church, Lyme Regis)
- J. Cyril Chant 1921 - 1924
- C.A. Jarman 1924 - 1925
- J.W.M. Price 1925 - ca. 1957
- Derek Whitty

== Royal Arms ==
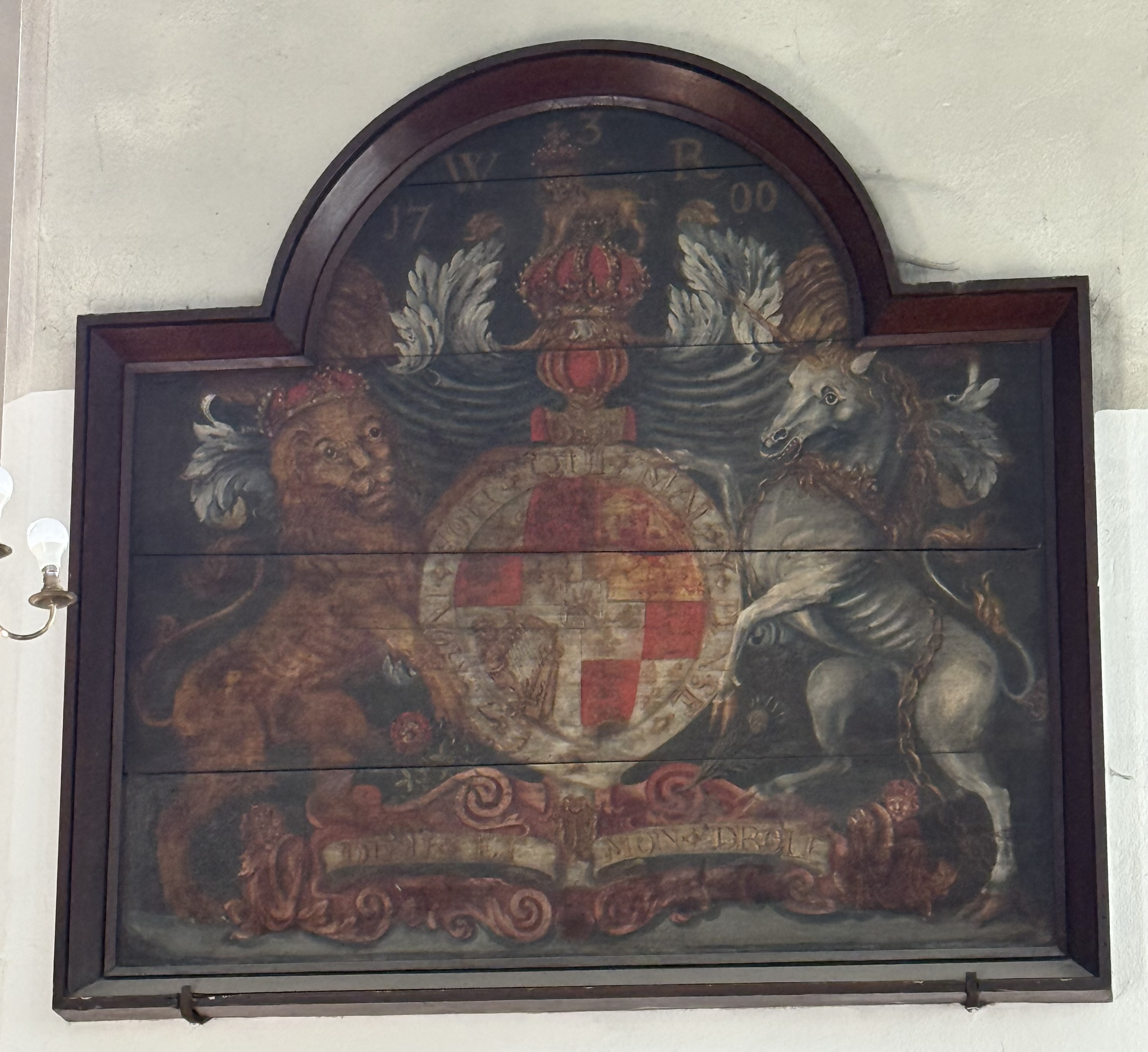
The arms of William III of England

On the south wall is displayed a painted wooden panel dated 1700 bearing the arms of William III of England, presented to the church after the sacking by the French in 1690.

== Bells ==
A ring of eight bells was provided in 1897. The bells were cast by Llewellins & James of Bristol in the key of E flat with a tenor weight of 1,130 kilograms (2,490 lb).

When the bells were installed a mechanism was added to allow the chiming mechanism in the clock to be connected to the bells. Groves of Wolverhampton also added an apparatus which allowed for silent practice on the bells. These additions cost £630 (equivalent to £70,800 in 2025).

== Clock ==
As a feature of the new tower in 1889 a clock was provided by John Smith of Derby using the three-legged gravity escapement designed by Edmund Beckett, 1st Baron Grimthorpe. Four dials were installed on the outside of the tower, three being 5 feet (1.5 m) in diameter, and the fourth being 4 feet 8 inches (1.42 m). The pendulum weight was 3 cwt with a rod which compensated for temperature changes. The clock struck the hours on an existing tower bell. The makers suggested the clock would be accurate to about 10 seconds within one month.

== Memorials ==
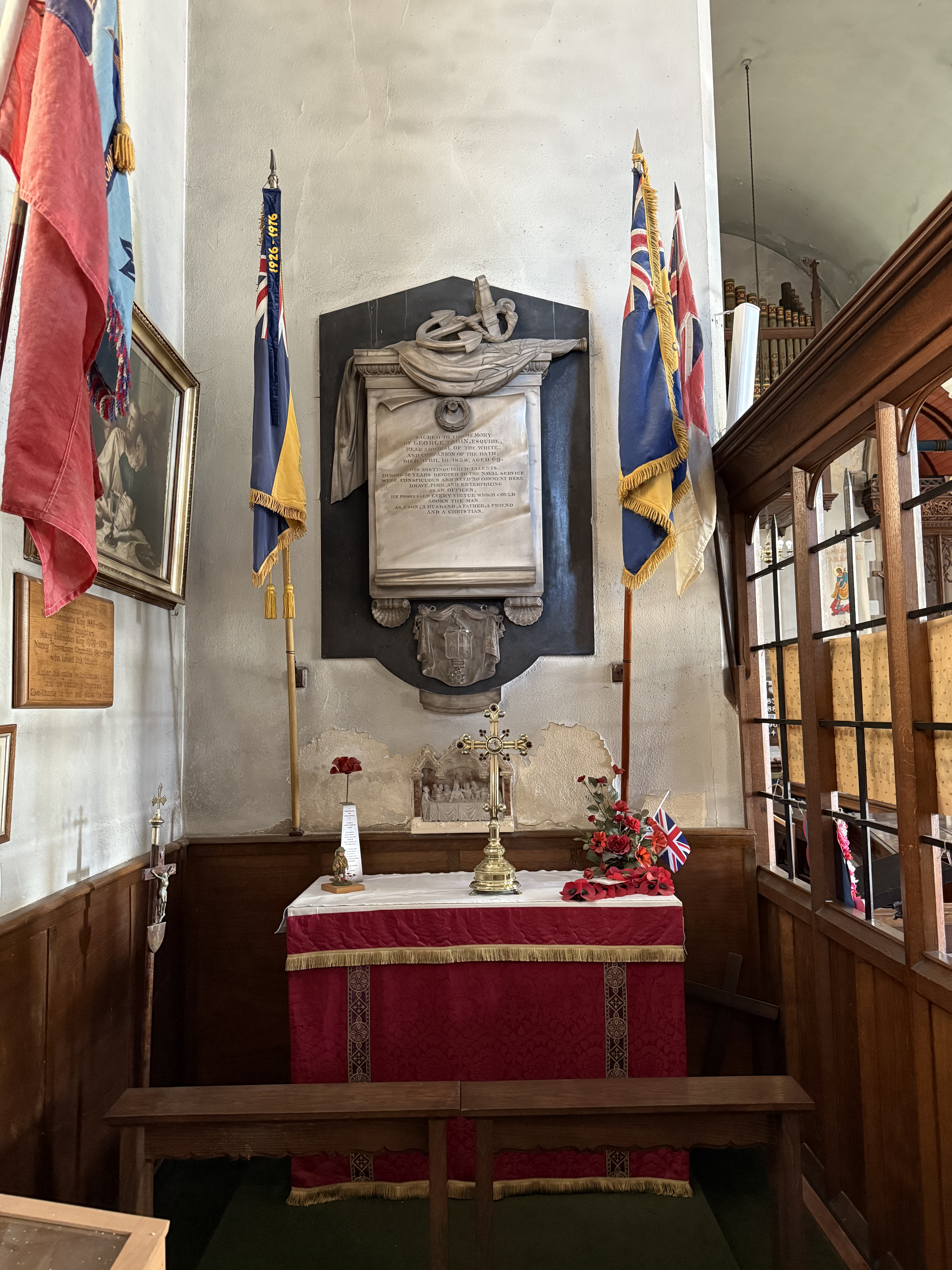
Memorial to Rear-Admiral George Tobin

- Rear-Admiral George Tobin (1768–1838)
- Sir John Strachan, 9th Baronet (1761-1844)
- Sir John Strachan, 10th Baronet (d.1854)
