= Herodsfoot =

Village in Cornwall, England

Coordinates: 50.416°N 4.514°W

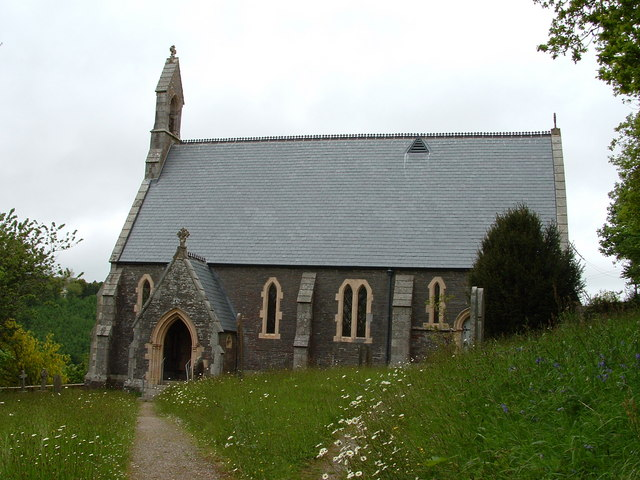
Herodsfoot Church

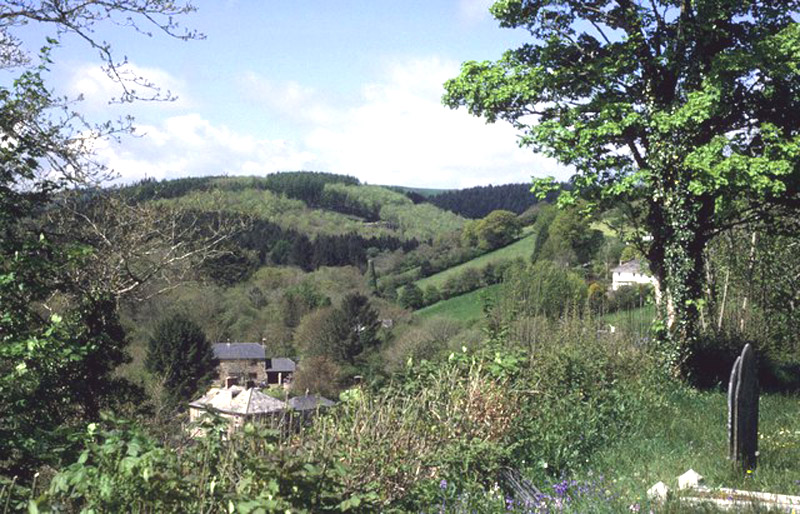
The village green at Herodsfoot

Herodsfoot (Cornish: Nanshiryarth) is a village in southeast Cornwall, England, United Kingdom. It is situated approximately four miles (6 km) southwest of Liskeard and five miles (8 km) north of Looe at a point where two tributaries of the West Looe river join. It is in the civil parish of Lanreath.

The name Herodsfoot derives from the Cornish 'Nanshiryarth' and means 'the foot of the stream at Heriard'. The name 'Heriard' was changed to Heriod in the 17th century and then to Herod in the 18th century. Bartholomew's map of 1879 in Black's Guide to Cornwall of that year has "Herras Foot" but this had become "Herodsfoot" by editions of around 1900.

There has been a settlement here since medieval times, with people gaining a living from the Herodsfoot and Deer Park forests as well as locally cultivated orchards, but it was not until silver and lead mines were dug into the steep valley walls that the population began to grow.

Herodsfoot is one of 51 Thankful Villages in the UK and the only one in Cornwall (the 'thankful villages' are those that lost no men in World War I). It is "doubly thankful", as one of only 14 villages that lost no men in World War II either. The village is featured on Darren Hayman's album, Thankful Villages Volume 1.

== Church history ==
In 1851 the parish was created from parts of Duloe, Lanreath, and St Pinnock parishes and the Church of All Saints was built high on the hillside in 1850 by the architect John Hayward of Exeter —described by John Betjeman as 'big boned and stately'. The Church is a substantial building, buttressed all round under a very high pitched, slate roof and a turret at the Western end hung with a single bell. The font is of 14th century workmanship and was brought here from the ruined chapel of St Martin at Respryn in St Winnow. The population of the village was a mere 116 when the Church was opened but ten years later had quadrupled and reached a peak in 1871 with 499 people being recorded in the census. The Rev Enys Henry Rogers was vicar of Herodsfoot 1900–1902. In 1936, St Cuby's at Duloe, and All Saints Herodsfoot joined to become the united benefice of Duloe-with-Herodsfoot.
