= Strachan baronets =

Extinct baronetcy in the Baronetage of Nova Scotia

The Strachan baronetcy, of Thornton, Kincardineshire, was created in the Baronetage of Nova Scotia in 1625 for Alexander Strachan or Straquhan. He had been Member of the Parliament of Scotland for Kincardineshire in 1617, and was again in 1630. He was the son of Robert Strachan and his wife Sarah Douglas, daughter of William Douglas, 9th Earl of Angus. He married, firstly in 1605, Margaret Lindsay, third daughter of John Lindsay of Balcarres, Lord Menmuir; and, secondly after 1623, Margaret, daughter of James Ogilvy, 5th Lord Ogilvy of Airlie and widow of George Keith, 5th Earl Marischal. He was a favourite of King Charles I.

After the death by 1659 of the 2nd Baronet, the baronetcy, according to Cokayne, was dormant. There followed a lengthy history of claimants, grants and retrospective claims to the title.

== Strachan baronets, of Thornton (1625) ==
- Sir Alexander Strachan, 1st Baronet (died c. 1646) On 28 May 1625, Alexander Strachan of Thornton acquired and was elevated to the newly created dignity of Baronet of Nova Scotia, at the beginning of the reign of King Charles I. The foundation of this Baronetage was at the request of William Alexander; and Strachan was one of the founding group of creations. The notional colonisation project in Nova Scotia was initially troubled, and unpopular.

In 1628 Strachan was given a commission to research "omissions and concealments" in past treasury matters. By 1630 the investigation had proved so contentious that the commission was dropped, with William Graham, 7th Earl of Menteith, Sir Thomas Hope, 1st Baronet and Alexander, the king's supporters, making an effort to smooth matters over. He also suggested tax farming of the dues called "feudal casualties" at higher rates, which proved unacceptable. He became a Commissioner of the Exchequer in 1630, then of the Treasury.

Strachan was an early figure in Scottish Freemasonry, joining the Edinburgh Lodge in 1634 with the brothers Lord Alexander and Anthony Alexander who was Master of Work to the Crown of Scotland, sons of William Alexander, by that time 1st Earl of Stirling, "non-operatives" rather than the founding stonemasons. Stevenson suggests that John Mylne who joined in 1663 may have interested the group in the lodge.

Strachan had a seal, dated 1604, a stag trippant. He died about 1646. It is said that he had financial troubles. A satirical poem of the period links him by the seat name Thornton with those of Tulliallan (the Blackadder baronets, with just one holder) and Dunipace (the Livingstoun baronets, again with just one holder) who are said to have wanted the money back that they paid for the title.

- Sir Alexander Strachan, 2nd Baronet (died c. 1659). From a decrete in 1637, he was the son of the 1st Baronet. In 1651, he served on the Committee for Managing the Affairs of the Army, and Committee of Estates. He opposed the Crown in the Wars of the Three Kingdoms (1638–1651) while serving in the Scottish Government. After the Covenanter defeat, he with others self-exiled to Bruges in the Spanish Netherlands, where he died without heir in c. 1659.

== Later developments ==
Period	Person	Comments	Heraldry
17th century	Sir James Strachan of Inchtuthill (died 1686)	Allegedly a descendant from a remote ancestor of the 1st Baronet, but “the relationship… is so distant, and the pedigree so uncertain that the right of such assumption seems extremely doubtful”. Sir James Strachan was married to Elizabeth Forbes He moved into the Thornton Estate in about 1654, before the death of the prior Sir Alexander in 1659 who was in exile in Flanders. It is virtually certain that Sir James of Thornton (formerly of Inchtuthill) did not recognisedhimself as Baronet of Nova Scotia, nor does it appear the Crown recognised him as Baronet. In a personal letter, he does not refer to himself as Baronet. Also, in 1661, when Sir James was a member of the Estates of Parliament, is he not referred to as Baronet. Sir James is also not referred to as Baronet in a royal infeftment dated 1681. The source for the erroneous attribution of a baronetcy assumed by Sir James and his son and namesake, appears to be Playfair's British Baronetage (1811), which describes Sir James Strachan as the "third baronet". Playfair further asserts that he served for a time as Minister of Keith (a different person) in Moray before being removed from his benefice during the political disturbances of the period. This was repeated by Rogers, Cokayne, Jervise, MacFarlane, and other antiquarian historians.	
17th century	Sir James Strachan, Fiar (heir) of Thornton (c.1640−1715)	On 15 July 1581, Sir James Strachan, the fiar (heir) of Thornton, and his spouse Barbara Forbes, received an infeftment of the barony of Thornton upon the resignation of Sir James Strachan, elder, of Thornetoune, Robert Forbes of Newtoune.	
17th century	Alleged Sir James Strachan of Thornton - Minister of Keith in Banff (1686)	Cokayne refers to this person as Sir James Strachan of Pittendreich, Baronet. Pittendreich appears to have been a pendicle or subordinate holding within the lands of Thornton in Marykirk parish, Kincardineshire. The name survives today as Pitdrichie, a farm near Thornton Castle. By this date, and certainly by the early 1700s, sources seemingly confirm the Strachan's had lost the barony and estate of Thornton through a decreet of the Lords of Council and Session (1683) as debtors to the Forbes Family. Subsequently, the territorial designation "of Thornton" used here was given either as a courtesy, or alternatively, Sir James may have been a tenant or otherwise residing at Thornton, as suggested by Cokayne (unknown source). We also have no record of Sir James ever using the post-nominals Bt. or Baronet. The honorific Sir was sometimes applied to parish ministers; Andrew Jervise may be the source of this confusion.	
18th century	Alleged Sir William Strachan (1715)	Cokayne's Complete Baronetage asserts that a Sir William Strachan succeeded to the Baronetcy of Strachan in or about 1715. The citation is to an entry in the parish register of Marykirk, recording the baptism of William, natural son of Sir William Strachan of Thornton, on 21 July 1715. This source may have obtained this information from Jervise.	
18th century	Alleged Sir Francis Strachan (1725)	According to Playfair's British Baronetage, "Sir James Strachan of Thornton (formerly of Inchtuthill), married a daughter of Forbes of Waterton, and had a son, Sir Francis Strachan, the fourth baronet, a Jesuit priest in Paris."	
17th century	Sir John Strachan of Inchtuthill, 3rd Baronet	Granted armorial bearings by the College of Arms in London, England in 1685, and recognised as Baronet	Blazon: Or, a stag at gaze Azure attired Sable a border Gules for differencing. Crest: A demi stag springing Or, holding a thistle in his mouth proper. Motto: Non Timeo Sed Caveo. Supporters: Two greyhounds, proper.
18th century	Sir John Strachan, Esq., 4th Baronet	Granted Scottish Arms by the Court of the Lord Lyon in 1740, which the Register states, "STRACHAN, John, Esquire, who now designs himself Sir John Strachan [Baronet of Nova Scotia].	Blazon: Or, a hart standing at a Gaze Azure attired Sable with the Arms of Nova Scotia in the dexter Canton. Crest: A demi stage springing Or holding a thistle in his mouth proper. Motto: Non Timeo Sed Caveo. Supporters: two grey hounds Argent each charged on the shoulder with a thistle proper.
18th century	Sir William Strachan, 5th Baronet (Counsillor of law)	Granted Scottish Arms by the Court of the Lord Lyon in 1756.	Blazon: Azure, a stag trippant Or, attired and unguled Gules. Crest: An arm and hand holding a scimitar bentways proper. Supporters: Two foresters clothed Vert, with a capes sable, a belt round their waists and staves in their hands proper. Motto: Forward.
18th century	Capt. Sir John Strachan, 6th Baronet	Capt. Sir John was matriculated Scottish Arms by the Court of the Lord Lyon in 25 APR 1765, and is recognised as Sir John Strachan	Blazon: Or, a hart (stag) standing at gaze, Azure, attired Sable, within a bordure Gules. Crest: A demi stag springing Or, holding a thistle in his mouth proper. Motto: Non Timeo Sed Caveo. In the Lyon Register, Sir John claims descent from Thomas Strachan of Inchtuthill, Bart., who is likely a descendant (son, grandson, or nephew) of the 3rd Baronet. He died in 1777, and the dignity of baronet passed to his nephew, Richard John Strachan, then aged 12 and serving in the Royal Navy.
18th century	Admiral Sir Richard John Strachan, 7th Baronet (27 October 1760 – 3 February 1828)	Richard Strachan was the nephew and heir of Capt. Sir John Strachan, 6th Baronet, and was referred to as "Sir Dicky" by his friends. He is popularly referred to as the 6th Baronet. He was never granted a matriculation of Arms. He has been considered the last "acknowledged" Baronet.	
19th century	Sir John Strachan of Cliffden (formerly of Woodside), Baronet	The title was not passed without claim. Allegedly an heir, John Strachan was born 22 March 1751, and was the only son of James Strachan, lieutenant, Royal Navy. He was a Magistrate for Stirlingshire, and married, 7 May 1777, Elizabeth, daughter of Alexander Hunter of Blackness, by whom he had, with other issue, a son, John, who succeeded him. In 1801 John Strachan sold Woodside, and was afterwards designed of Cliffden, Teignmouth, Devon. He, at the age of 91, did not file a petition through the Court of the Lord Lyon, but through the bailies of the Canongat'. This was likely because he could conduct a local service of heir, whereas the Court of the Lord Lyon could not and would not determine baronetcy succession or invent pedigree where proof was lacking. In practical terms, the Canongate route was procedurally easier, evidentially weaker, and strategically advantageous. In his claim or brief, Mr. Strachan sought to instruct his descent from Roger Strachan of Glichno, brother of John Strachan of Thornton, great-grandfather of the first Baronet. George, a son of the minister, was represented as a merchant in Montrose, and father of James Strachan, Lieutenant R.N. father of the claimant. This statement being accepted by a friendly jury, and certified by the Canongate bailies, formed the basis of a retour in Chancery, bearing date 8 November 1841. According to Burke, he had four children, (1) John (discussed below); (2) James Graham Strachan, of the Civil Service Bombay, deceased (unmarried); (3) Amelia, married to the Rev. William Page Richards, LL.D. Rector of Stoke Abbas, co. Dorset; and (4) Catherine Margaret, m. to John Cave, of Brentry House, co. Gloucester. Sir John died 9 June 1844 at the age of 93.	Burke describes the following armorial bearings: Quarterly, first and fourth, Or, a stag trippant Azure; second and third, Argent on the sea a galley, her oars in saltire Sable within a hordure wavy Azure. Empaling. Argent on a chevron Gules between three hunting-horns Vert, a crescent Argent between two cinquefoils or, for Hunter. Crest: First, a naked arm embowed proper, holding a scimitar also ppr. pomel and hilt or. Second, on a rudder a man's head sidefaced, all proper. Supporte: Two forresters proper. Motto. — Above the first Crest, Forward. Above the second, Steer steady. These arms are not provided in the General Armory, and were not registered in Scotland.
19th century	Sir John Strachan of Cliffden, Baronet	He was the eldest surviving son of the former Sir John of Cliffden, succeedin his father after his death in 1844. He died 10 years later at Cliffden, aged 70, on 28 January 1854 after a long illness. He was married to Mary Ann, daughter of Isaac Elton, Esq., of White Stauton House, and had no issue. Regarding the Strachans of Cliffden, Nichols commented "So [with the death of Sir John] there was an end to the claim, which never would have asserted itself [after 1828] but for the absurd facilities afforded by the law then existing in Scotland."	

== Gallery ==
Arms of Strachan of Thornton

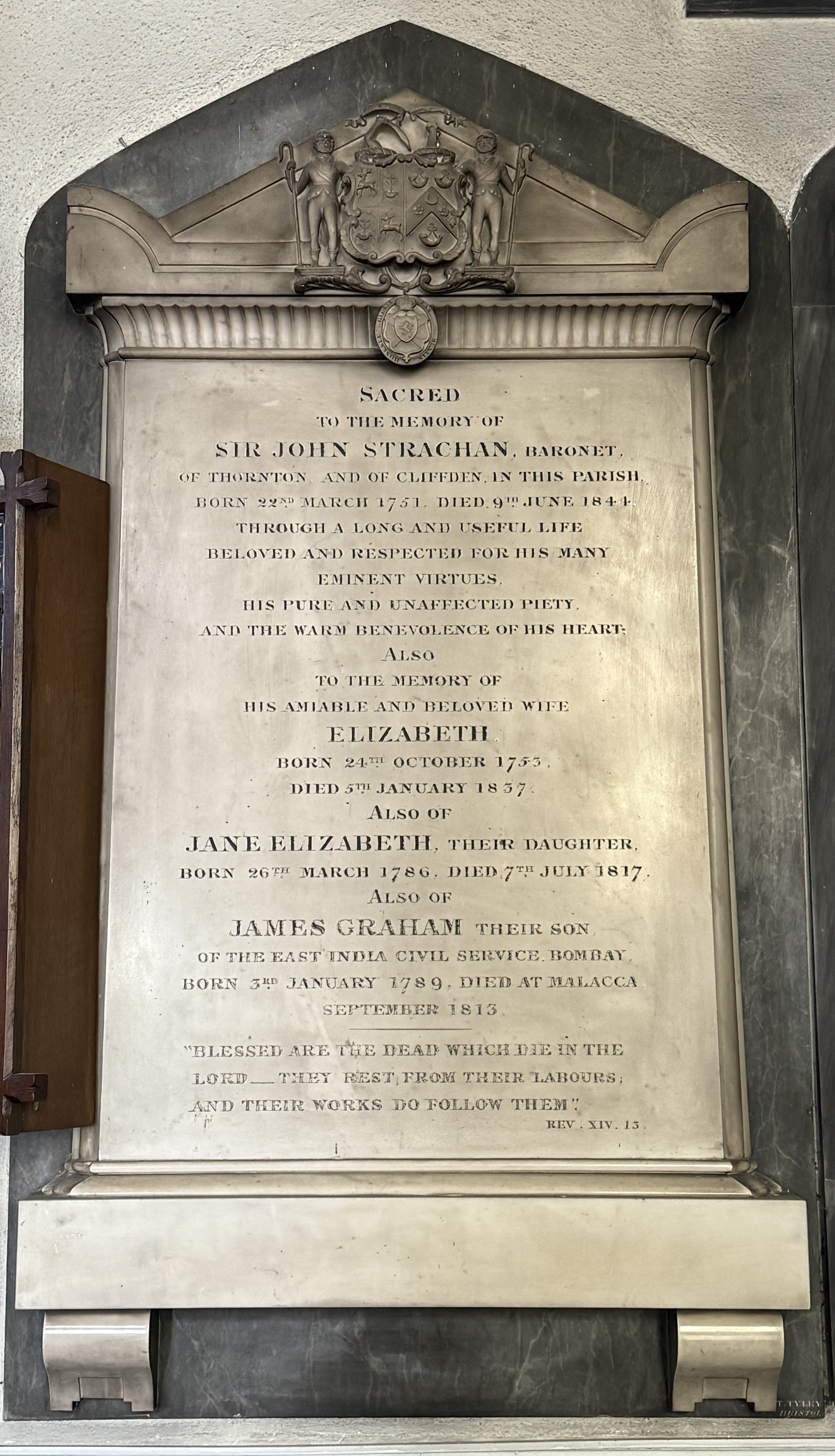
Memorial to Sir John Strachan, 9th Baronet in St Michael the Archangel's Church, Teignmouth

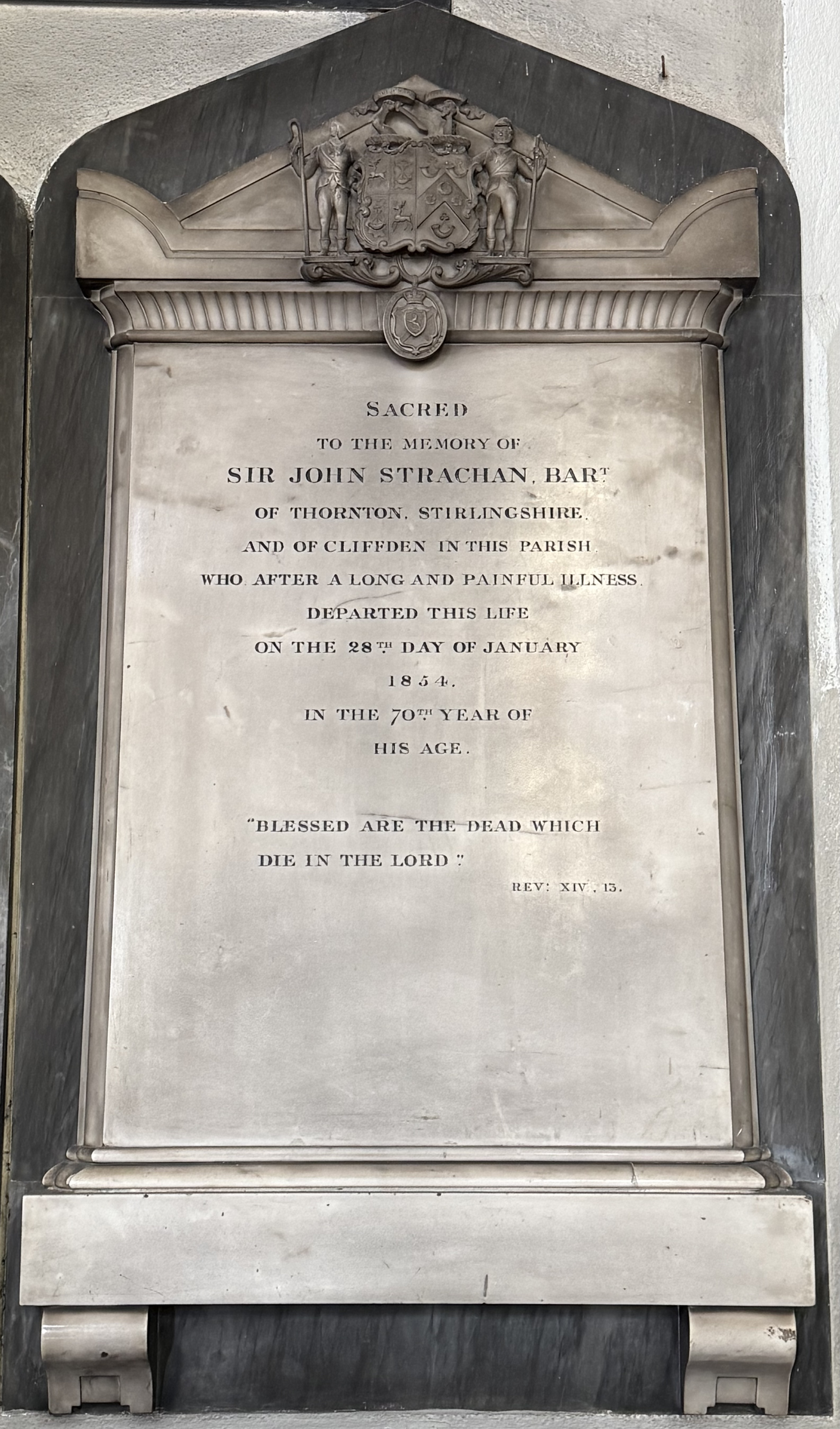
Memorial to Sir John Strachan, 10th Baronet in St Michael the Archangel's Church, Teignmouth

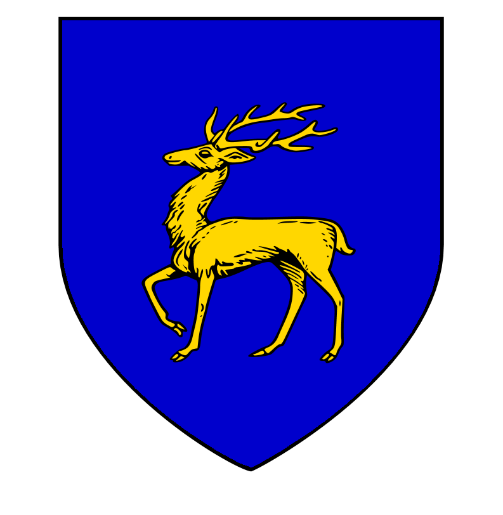
Shield of Sir Alexander Strachan, 1st Baronet (1609)

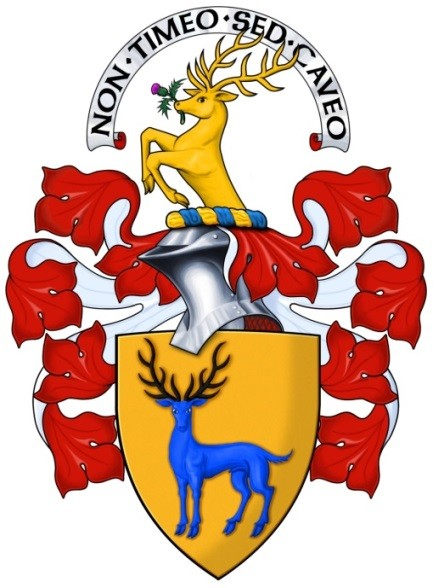
Presumed to be the Arms of James Strachan of Thornton (formerly of Inchtuthill) d. 1686

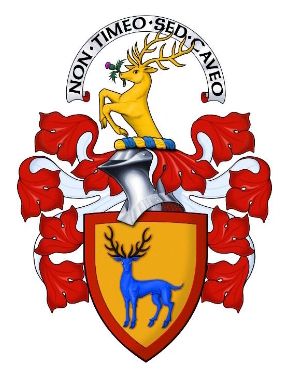
Arms of Captain Sir John Strachan, Baronet (1765), and Sir John Strachan of Inchtuthill, Baronet (1685) with Supporters (two greyhounds, proper, not shown here).

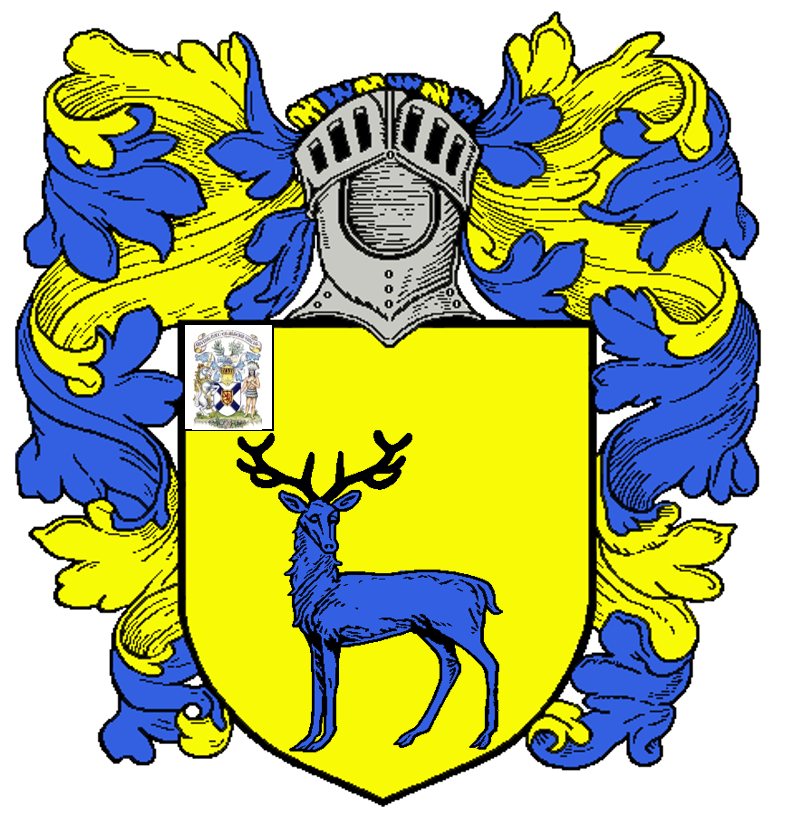
Shield of Sir John Strachan, Esq., Baronet (1740); in dexter canton, the Arms of Nova Scotia

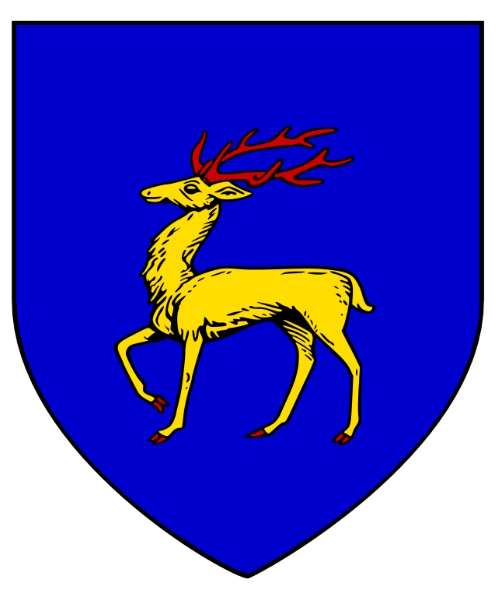
Arms of Sir William Strachan, Bt. Councillor of law, London (1756)
