= St Gregory's Church, Dawlish =

St Gregory’s Church, Dawlish
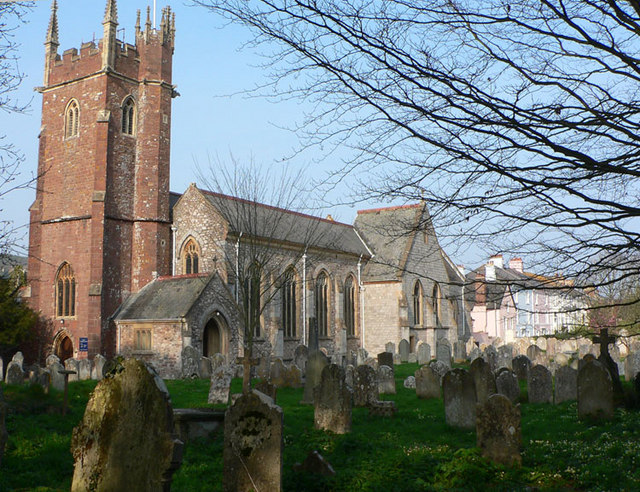
- St Gregory’s Church, Dawlish
- St Gregory’s Church, Dawlish
- 50°34′49″N 3°28′46″W
- OS grid reference: SX 95330 76643
- Country: England
- Denomination: Church of England
- Website: cofe-in-dawlish.org.uk/st-gregorys-church/

History
- Status: Active
- Dedication: St Gregory the Great

Architecture
- Heritage designation: Grade II* listed
- Years built: 1824-25

Administration
- Diocese: Diocese of Exeter
- Archdeaconry: Archdeaconry of Exeter
- Deanery: Kenn
- Benefice: Dawlish with Holcombe, Cofton, and Starcross
- Parish: Dawlish with Holcombe

St Gregory’s Church, Dawlish is a Grade II* listed Church of England parish church in Dawlish, Devon.

== History ==
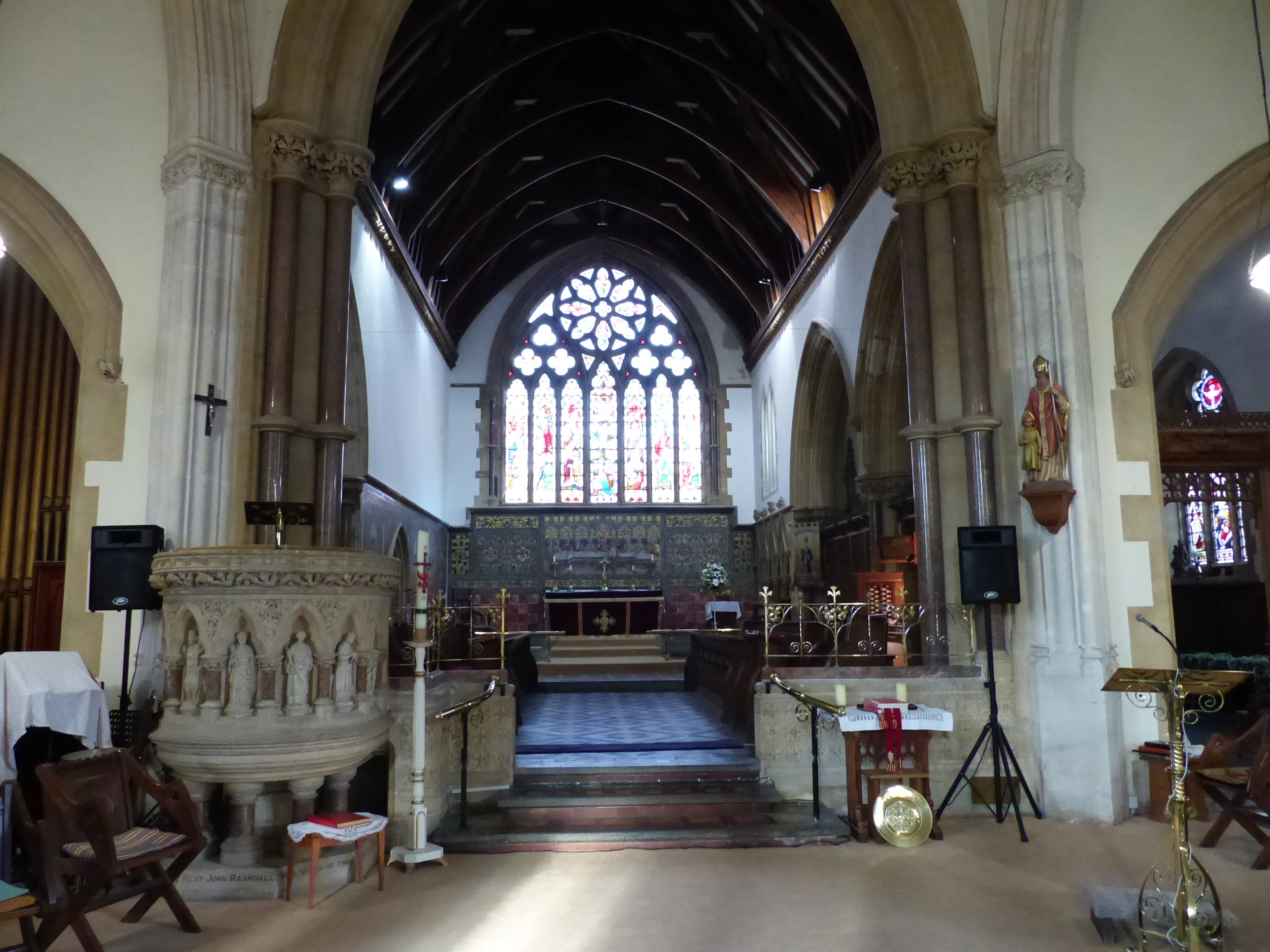
The interior of the church

The church retains a medieval tower, but the rest was rebuilt in 1824-24 under the supervision of architect Andrew Patey of Exeter. The church re-opened on 1 May 1825.

In 1851 a daughter church St Mark's Church, Dawlish was opened in the town.

Despite the later addition of galleries, the accommodation at St Gregory's was inadequate for a growing population, so the church closed for 18 months at the end of 1873 for enlargement. The transepts were enlarged and a chancel was erected 43 feet (13 m) long by 22 feet (6.7 m) wide with an aisle on the southern side of it. An organ chamber was added and a vestry on the northern side. The architect for these alterations was James Piers St Aubyn and the contractors were Diment and Stevens of Bristol. The cost of these alterations was in the region of £6,000 (equivalent to £598,600 in 2025).

== Organ ==
On the rebuilding of the church in 1825 a new organ was provided, probably by Brooking of Exeter. This was replaced in 1888 by a new instrument by Lewis and opened on 7 February 1889.

This instrument was later restored and enlarged again by Willis in 1951 and Eustace & Alldridge and now comprises 3 manuals and 42 stops. A specification of the organ can be found on the National Pipe Organ Register.

== Bells ==
The ring of eight bells in the key of F sharp comprises six dating from 1784 by John and Christopher Pennington and 2 from 1911 by Mears & Stainbank. The tenor weight is 594 kilograms (1,310 lb).

== Memorials ==
- Marble wall tablet to Francis Mary Hunter of Cavendish Square, London d.1803. Mourning woman, urn on pedestal. By John Flaxman.
- Marble wall tablet to Lady Elizabeth Pennyman d.1801, wife of Sir James Pennyman, 6th Baronet. Three mourning females, urn on pedestal by John Flaxman
