= St Mark's Church, Dawlish =

Demolished church in Devon, England

St Mark's Church
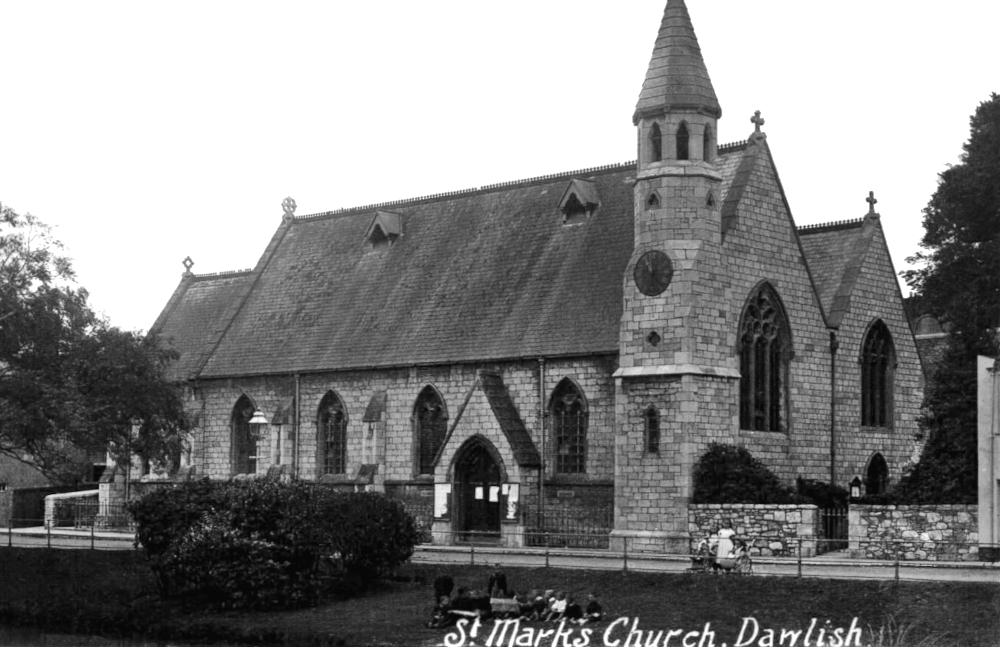
- St Mark's Church in circa 1915.

Religion
- Affiliation: Church of England
- Ecclesiastical or organizational status: Demolished

Location
- Location: Dawlish, Devon, England
- Interactive map of St Mark's Church
- Coordinates: 50.5803°N 3.4683°W

Architecture
- Architect: John Hayward
- Type: Church
- Completed: 1851

St Mark's Church was a Church of England church in Dawlish, Devon, England. It was built between 1849 and 1851 as a chapel of ease to the parish church of St Gregory. It closed as a place of worship in 1974 and was demolished in 1976. The site is now occupied by residential dwellings.

== History ==
=== Construction of St Mark's ===
St Mark's was built as a chapel of ease to the parish church of St Gregory, at a time when accommodation at the parish church had become inadequate to meet the needs of the growing town. The parish church was at an "inconvenient distance" for a good proportion of the town and it was also felt that the church did not have an adequate number of free sittings for the poorer inhabitants. Among the contributors to the building fund for the new church was the owner of Luscombe Castle, Charles Hoare, who contributed £1,000, along with a further £1,000 towards its endowment, and his wife, who gave a further £1,000.

The plans for St Mark's were drawn up by the architect John Hayward of Exeter. It was made up of a nave, chancel and vestry, and had seated accommodation for 287 people, of which 197 seats were free and 90 were appropriated. A gallery level held 28 seats and the organ.

The foundation stone was laid by Hoare's nephew, Robert Blencowe, on 15 May 1849, and the completed church was consecrated by the Bishop of Exeter, the Right Rev. Henry Phillpotts, on 23 April 1851. The church's masonry work was carried out by Messrs. Spencer and Matthews, with Samuel Knight as the stonemason, and Mr. Parker was the painter, plumber and glazier.

=== Enlargement and restoration ===
From the time of its opening, St Mark's often saw full attendance during services, particularly on Sunday evenings. By October 1851, the Western Times reported that the church had been "so well attended of late on Sunday evenings that sitting room has been unattainable by many" and added the new place of worship is, "as we have already said, far too small for the town". In 1878, after the restoration of St Gregory's was completed, plans were made to enlarge St Mark's by adding a south aisle and a subscription list was started towards the work. The church was described as "often very crowded during the season" and particularly when poor weather prevented inhabitants from walking to the parish church. By May 1881, the fund had reached over £600 and an anonymous donation of £400 was received in June 1883.

The enlargement plans, which were drawn up by Messrs. Hayward and Son of Exeter in 1879, saw accommodation increase from 255 to 416 seats. The work was carried out in three phases and tenders for the first were sought in May 1883, for the excavation of a bank on the south side of the church and building a retaining wall and stove chamber. The tender of J. Hawkins of Dawlish was accepted that month for £182 and the heating arrangements were entrusted to Messrs. King and Munk of Exeter.

The second phase, involving the construction of a new aisle and the reseating of the nave, was approved in October 1883 and the tender of J. G. Stephens of Exeter, at £943, was accepted the following month. The new 19 foot wide aisle was completed in July 1884 and, after a period of further fundraising, tenders for the third phase of work were sought in April 1885. This included the construction of an organ chamber on the south side of the chancel, a new vestry, and adding choir stalls on the north side of the chancel. The tender of J. C. Stephens of Exeter was accepted for £305.

St Mark's was formally reopened on 7 October 1885. In addition to the three phases of work, the church received a new organ, built by Messrs. Hele & Co. of Plymouth, from Mrs. Norsworthy of Newlands. A new stone pulpit was gifted by the family of the late Mrs. Somerset in her memory in December 1885.

=== Closure and demolition ===
In 1969, the Church Council, concerned over the parish's financial position, recommended closing St Mark's in a bid to save money, but it was vetoed by the vicar, Rev. John Delve. St Mark's was declared redundant by the Church of England on 6 September 1974 and the Church Commissioners approved its demolition on 12 February 1975.

The demolition of the church was originally due to be carried out in September 1975, but the Church Commissioners postponed their plans due to local pressure. Some called for it to be retained for the benefit of the community, potentially as a community centre, youth club or sports hall, and concerns were also raised about the negative impact demolition would have on the conservation area. A local store owner, Alan Evans, gained over 1,000 signatures for his petition calling for the church to be saved.

The Redundant Churches Committee of the Church Commissioners held further meetings to discuss the matter, but ultimately the decision was made to continue as planned and St Mark's was demolished in early 1976. The site was subsequently sold to a private owner and redeveloped with the construction of six dwellings, known collectively as St Mark's, for which planning permission was granted in 1980.
