= John Hayward (architect) =

British architect

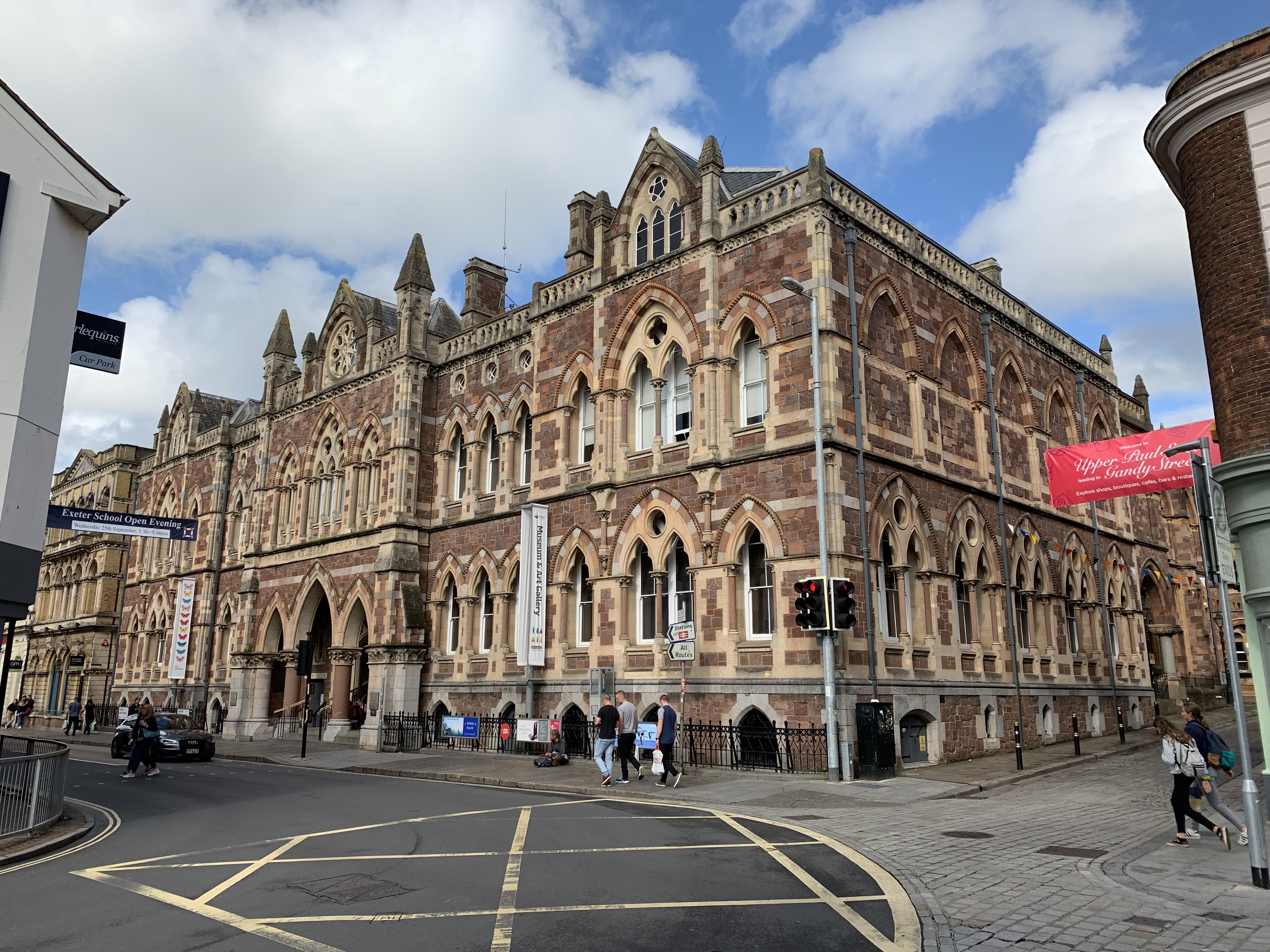
The Royal Albert Memorial Museum, Exeter, designed by John Hayward

John Hayward (1807–1891) was a Gothic Revival architect based in Exeter, Devon, who gained the reputation as "the senior architect in the west of England".

== Biography ==
John Hayward was born in London on 26 September 1807, the son of a 'house and ornament painter', John Pearson Hayward and Frances Barry and a nephew of Sir Charles Barry, the designer of the Palace of Westminster, with whom he served as pupil.

He was an accomplished painter and draughtsman; by 1826, he was exhibiting at the Royal Academy and, by 1834, he had left Barry and set up practice in Cathedral Yard, Exeter, Devon.

Hayward was official architect of The Exeter Diocesan Architectural Society, which meant that all new designs for the churches in the Exeter Diocese passed through him for approval, and a member of Cambridge Camden Society, later The Ecclesiological Society.

So popular was his work on local churches that St Andrew's, Exwick was described by The Ecclesiologist in July 1842, as the "best specimen of modern church we have yet seen."

This accolade soon led to further work; in Scotland, Lady Cecil Chetwynd-Talbot, the Marchioness of Lothian, commissioned Hayward to design St John's Church, Jedburgh in 1844, and in Oxfordshire he designed St. James' Church in Little Milton, Oxfordshire, to which he added the west tower in 1861.

But probably his most famous design was for The Royal Albert Memorial Museum, Exeter. which opened in 1868 as a practical memorial to Prince Albert, and is the largest museum in the city.

Whilst many of his designs were for religious use, he also designed schools and worked on other buildings, including The Hall, Pembroke College, Oxford, (1844) which Nikolaus Pevsner described as "the most ambitious of all halls except Wolsey's" at Christ Church College, and Exeter Prison on New North Road, Exeter, which was based upon the plans of the new model prison at Pentonville.

Hayward died on 7 May 1891. His son, Pearson Barry Hayward, worked under him, but died before his father in 1888; their practice was known as Messrs Hayward & Son.

== Work ==
Work, including restoration, undertaken by John Hayward and his practice includes:

=== In Cornwall ===
- All Saints, Herodsfoot
- All Saints, Tuckingmill, Camborne
- Holy Trinity, Carnmenellis
- St Cleder, St Clether

=== In Devon ===
- St Andrew, Exwick
- St Mary, Bickleigh
- St Mary, Bicton
- St Michael, Sowton
- St Mark, Dawlish
- St David, Exeter
- St Mary Arches, Exeter
- St Andrew, Halberton
- St Gregory, Harpford
- St John the Baptist, Holcombe Burnell
- St Thomas of Canterbury, Kingswear
- St Mary Magdalene, Monkton
- St Michael, Mumsbury
- St Michael, Beer
- St Mary, Appledore, Northam
- St Mary, Rockbeare
- St Mary, Whimple
- St Mary the Virgin, Woolfardisworthy, Mid Devon
- St Swithun, Sandford
- St Peter, Uplowman
- St Thomas the Apostle, Exeter
- St John The Evangelist, Tipton St John
- Holy Trinity, Ilfracombe
- St Philip and St James, Ilfracombe
- Paschoe House, Crediton
- All Saints, Okehampton
- St Bridget, Bridestowe
- Holy Trinity, Buckfastleigh
- Holy Trinity, Burrington
- St Eustachius' Church, Tavistock
- St Peter, Twitchen
- St Mary, Uffculme
- Crediton Parish Church
- St Michael and All Angels, Alphington
- St Luke's College, Exeter University
- The Exeter Diocesan Training School, now part of St. Luke's Campus
- All Hallows on the Wall, Exeter (since demolished)
- Queen Elizabeth School, Crediton
- Hele's School, Exeter
- The New Buildings, Blundell's School, Tiverton
- Blundell's School chapel, Tiverton
- The High School for Girls, Exeter. Renamed in 1912 as The Maynard School.
- All Saints chapel, Bradfield, Uffculme
- The Board School, Dawlish
- Holcombe Court, Holcombe Rogus
- The Halford Wing, Royal Devon & Exeter Hospital, Southernhay, Exeter, Devon
- Ashbury House, Ashbury, Devon (since demolished).

=== In Jersey ===
- St Mark, Saint Helier
- St Luke, Saint Saviour
- St George, Saint Ouen
- St Ouen, St Ouen
- Victoria College, St Helier
- Natwest Bank, Library Place, St Helier

=== Elsewhere ===
- St Michael, Milverton, Somerset
- St Peter, Walgrave, Northamptonshire
- St James, Little Milton, Oxfordshire
- St. John, Jedburgh, Scottish Borders
- The Hall, Pembroke College, Oxford
- The New Buildings of 1846 (since renamed the Robert Stevens building), Pembroke College, Oxford

== Gallery ==
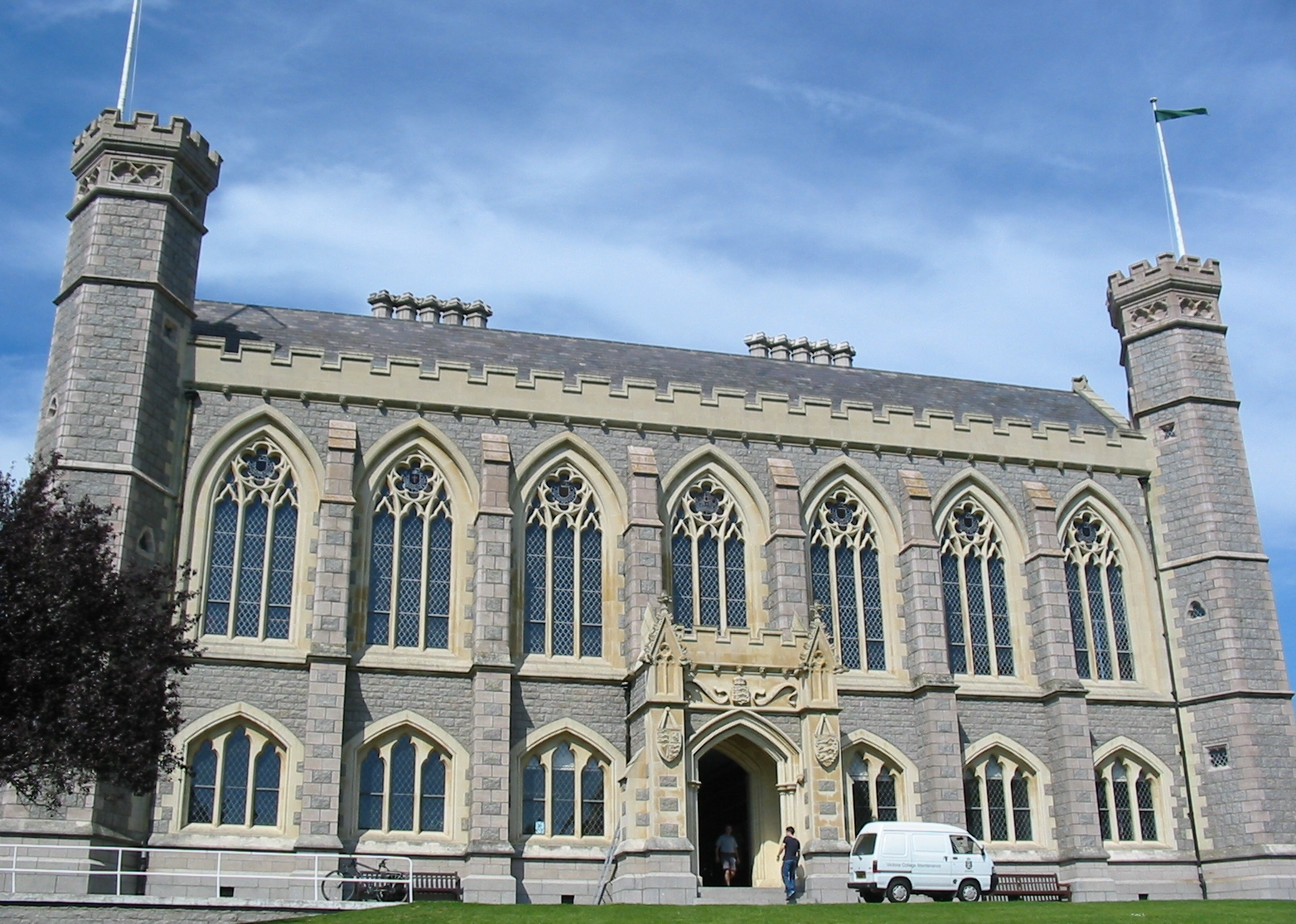
Victoria College at St Helier, Jersey

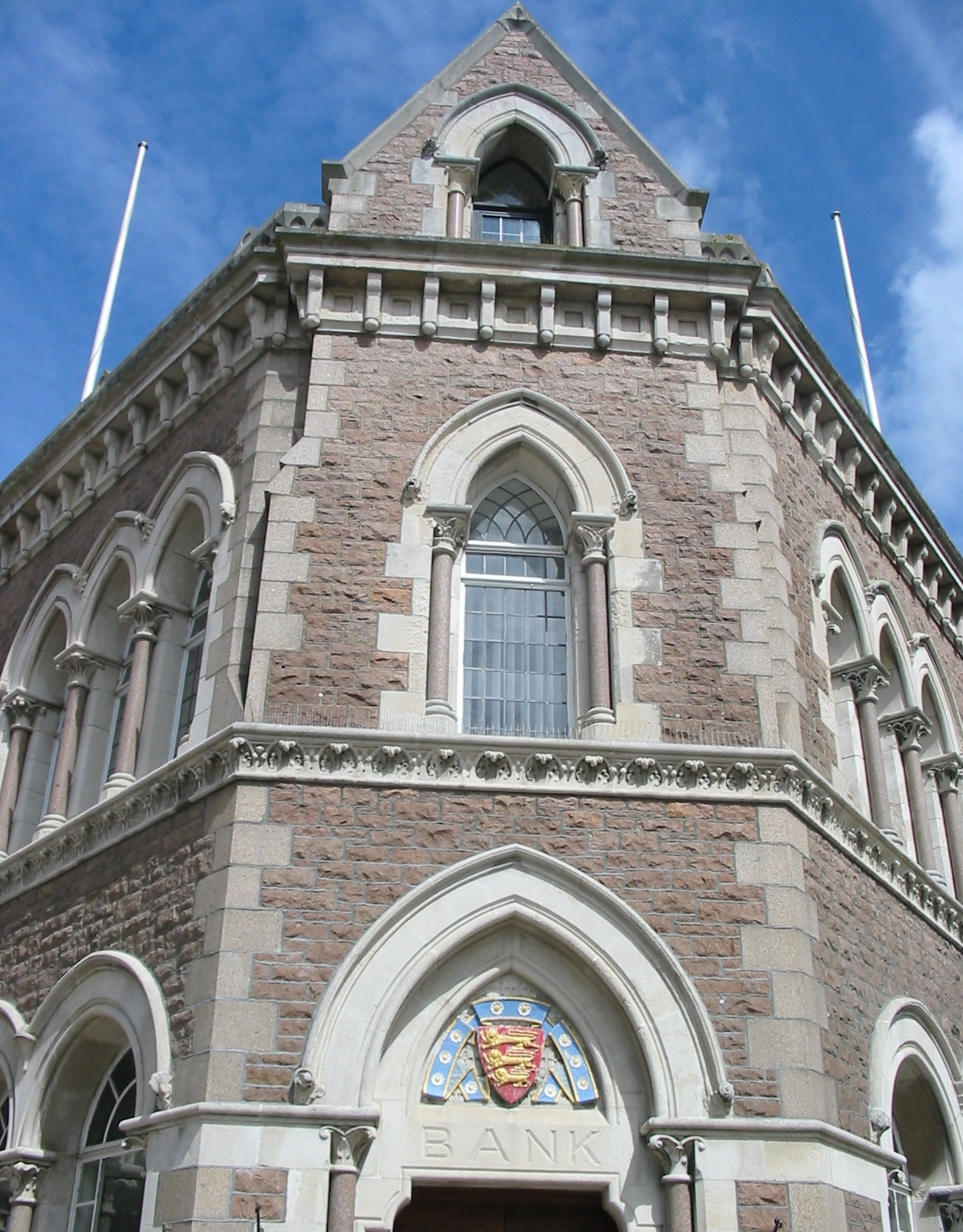
Bank building in Library Place, Saint Helier, Jersey – built in 1873 by John Hayward for Jersey Banking Company

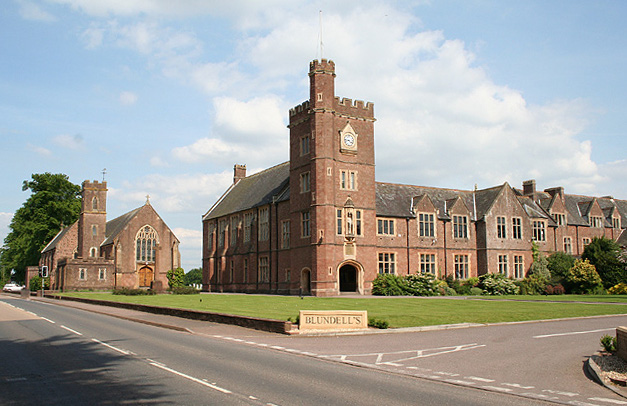
Blundell's School new buildings completed in 1882

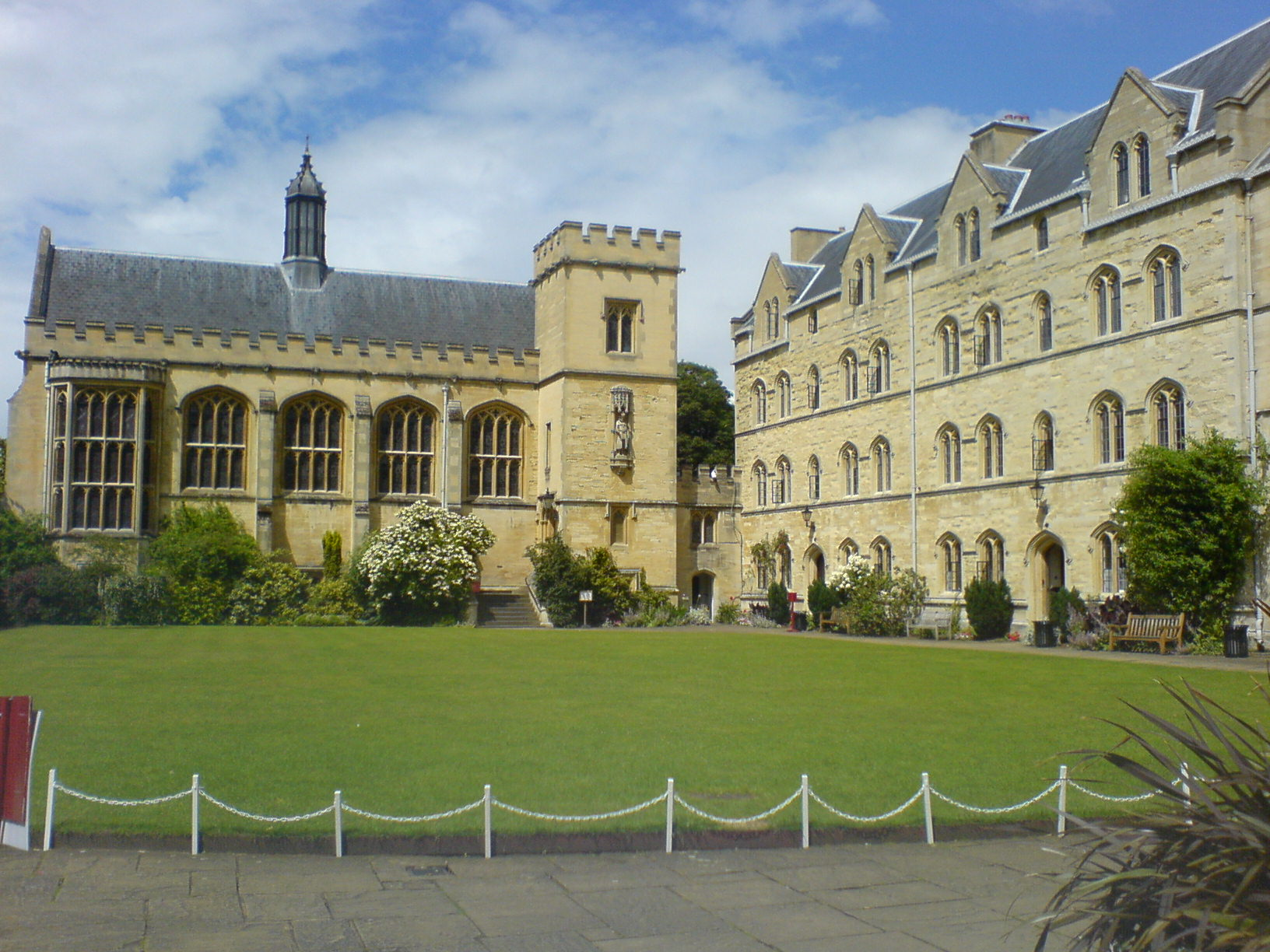
The Hall, Chapel Quad, Pembroke College, Oxford

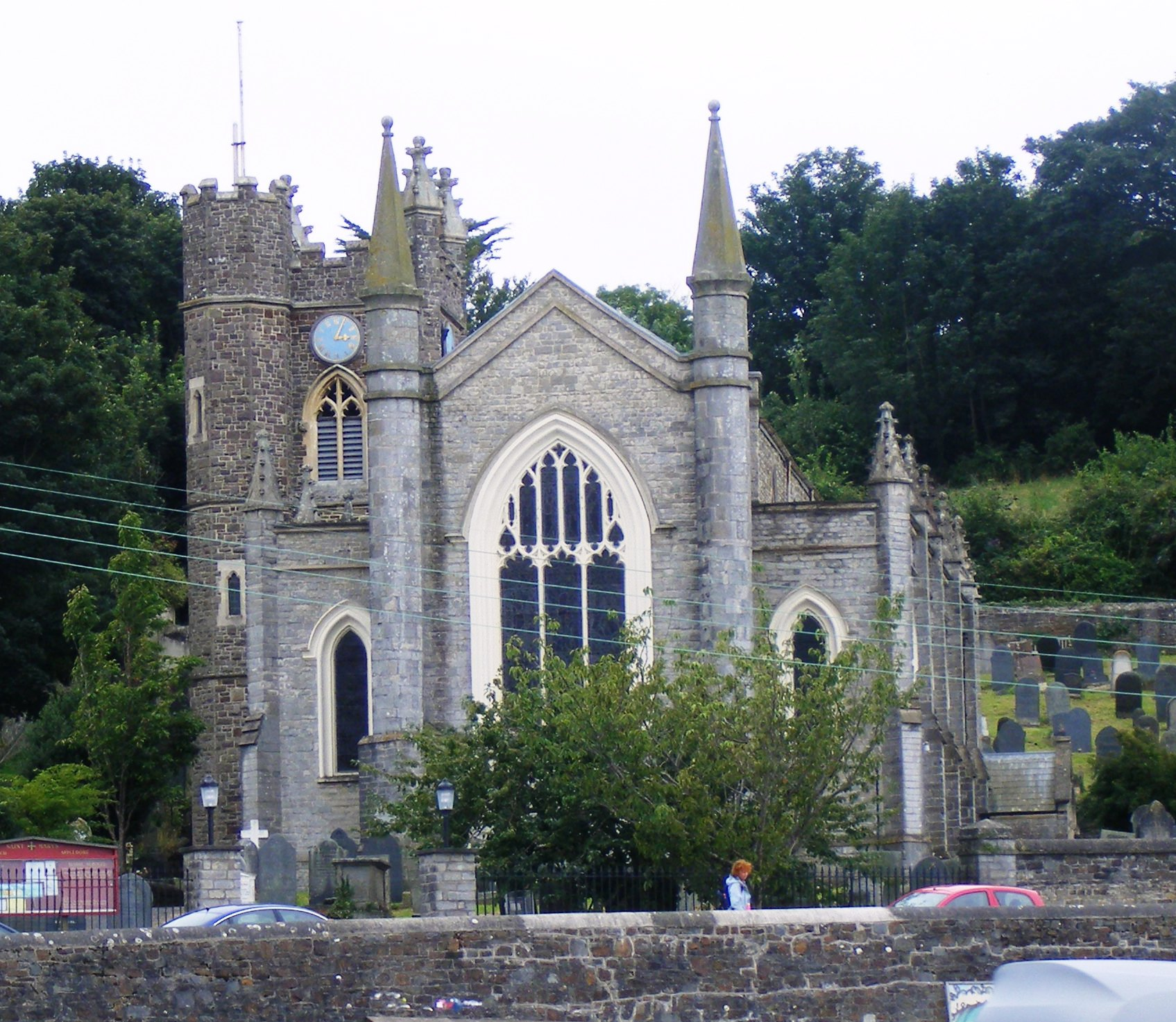
St Mary, Appledore, Devon

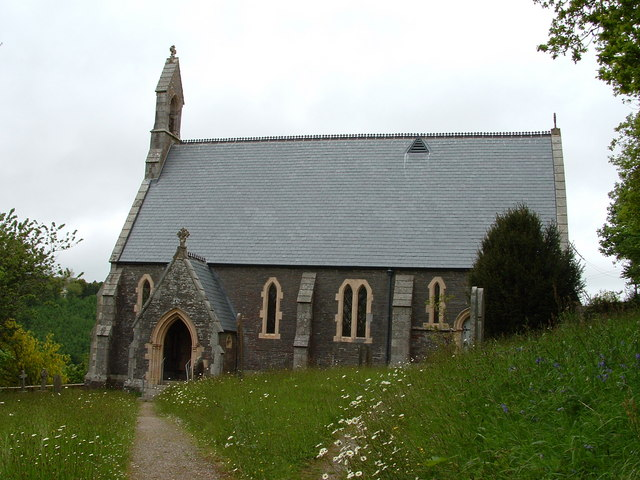
All Saints at Herodsfoot, Cornwall

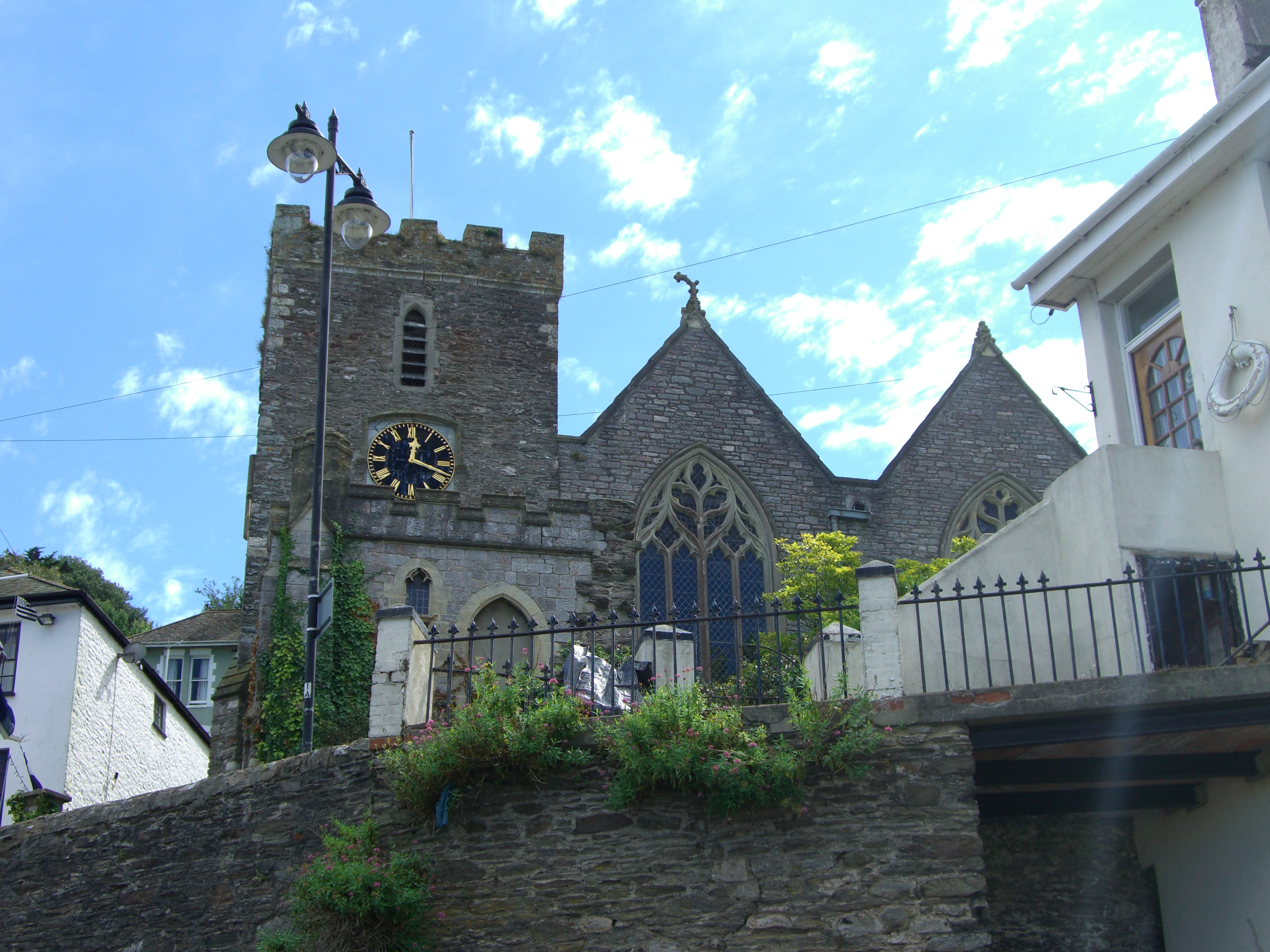
St. St Thomas of Canterbury, Kingswear, Devon

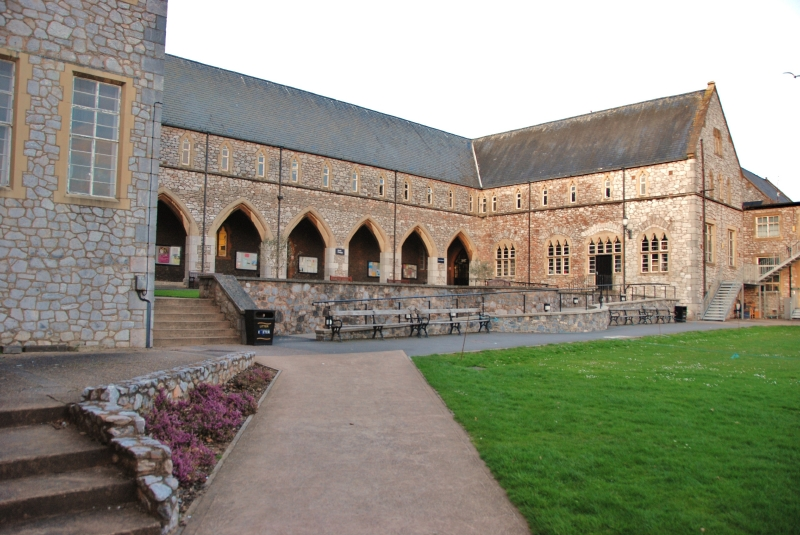
North Cloisters, St Luke's Campus

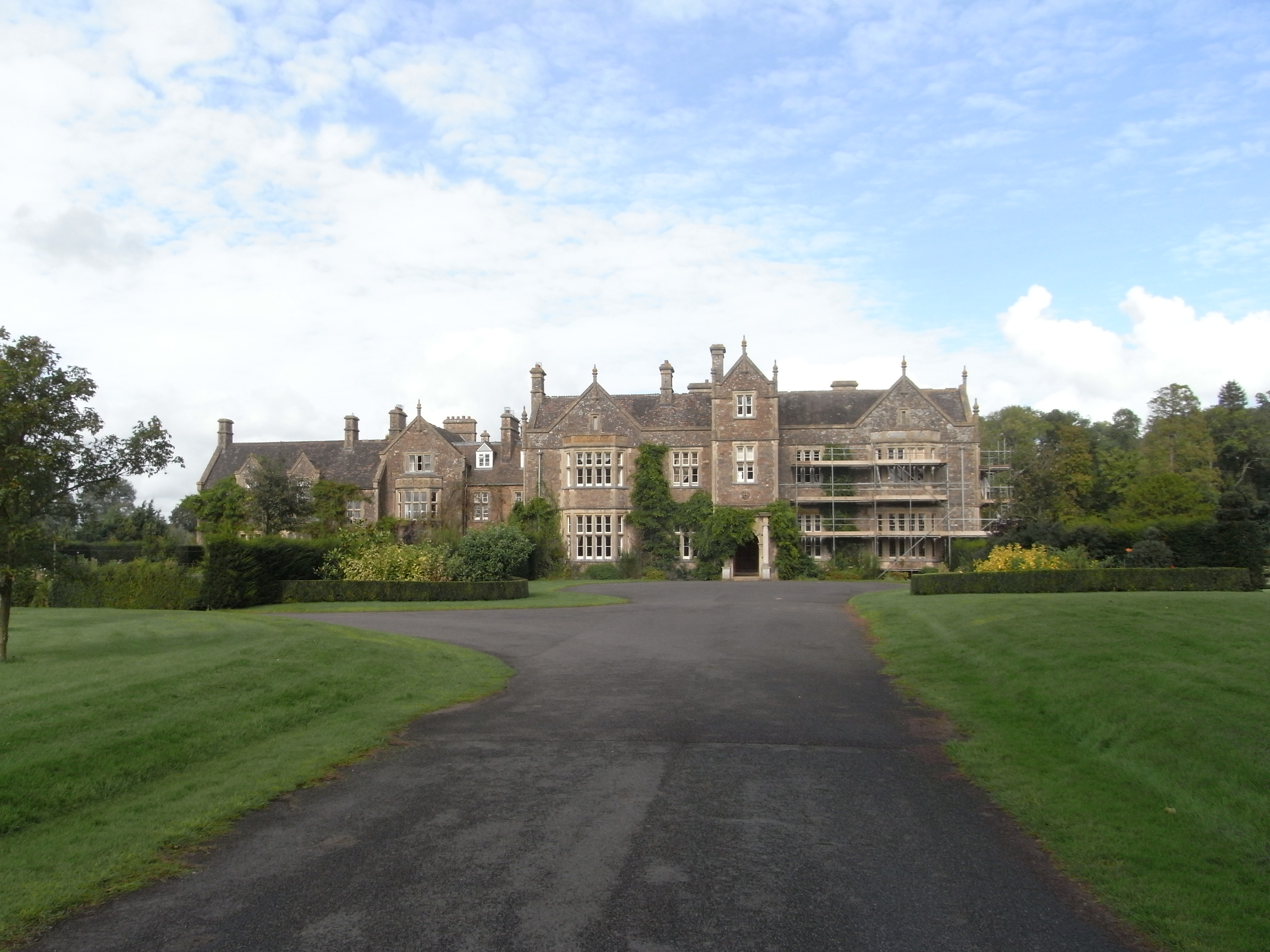
Bradfield House, the South front and service wing, added by Hayward in the 1860s

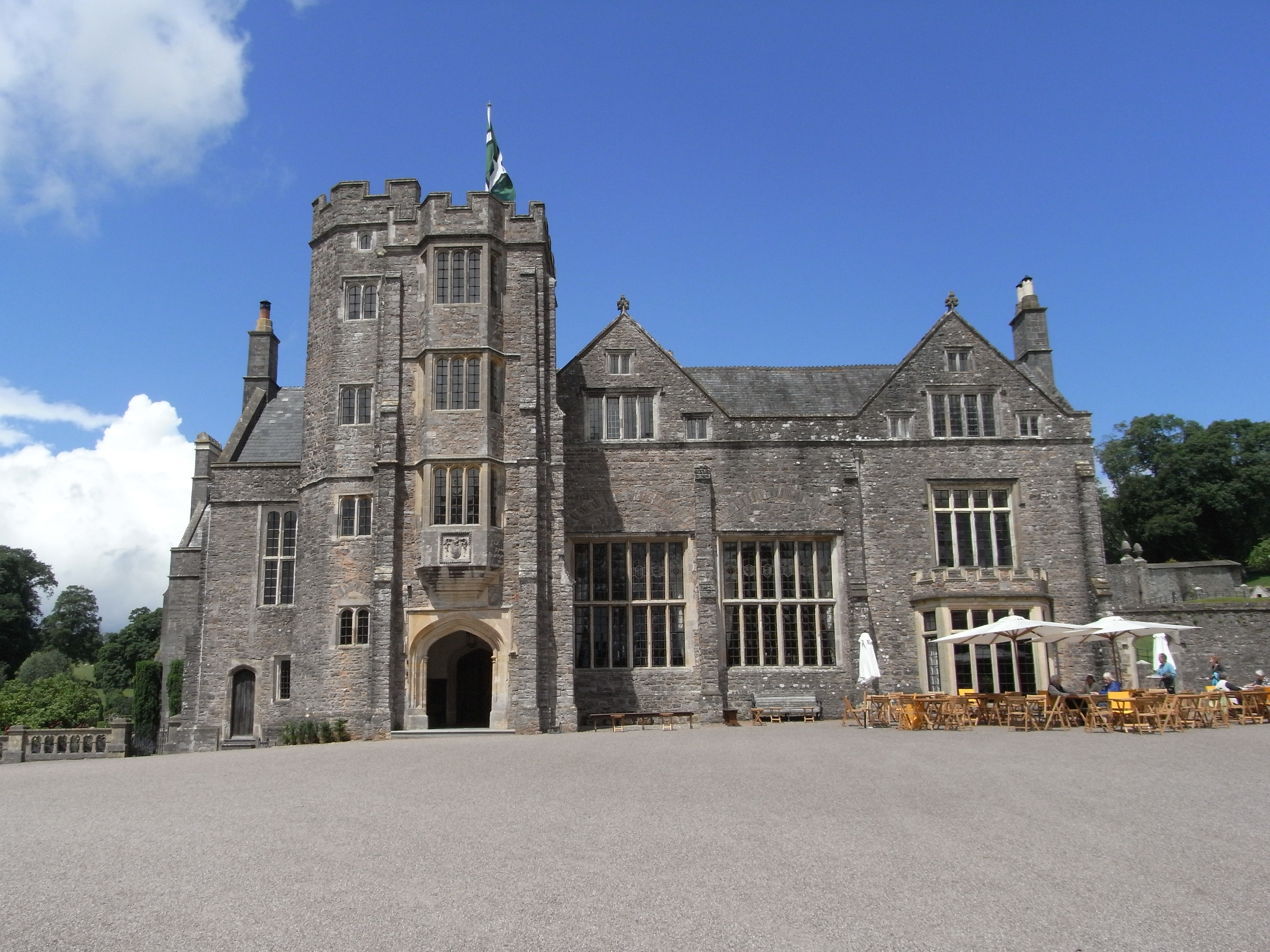
Holcombe Court, the North and West fronts were added by Hayward in 1863.

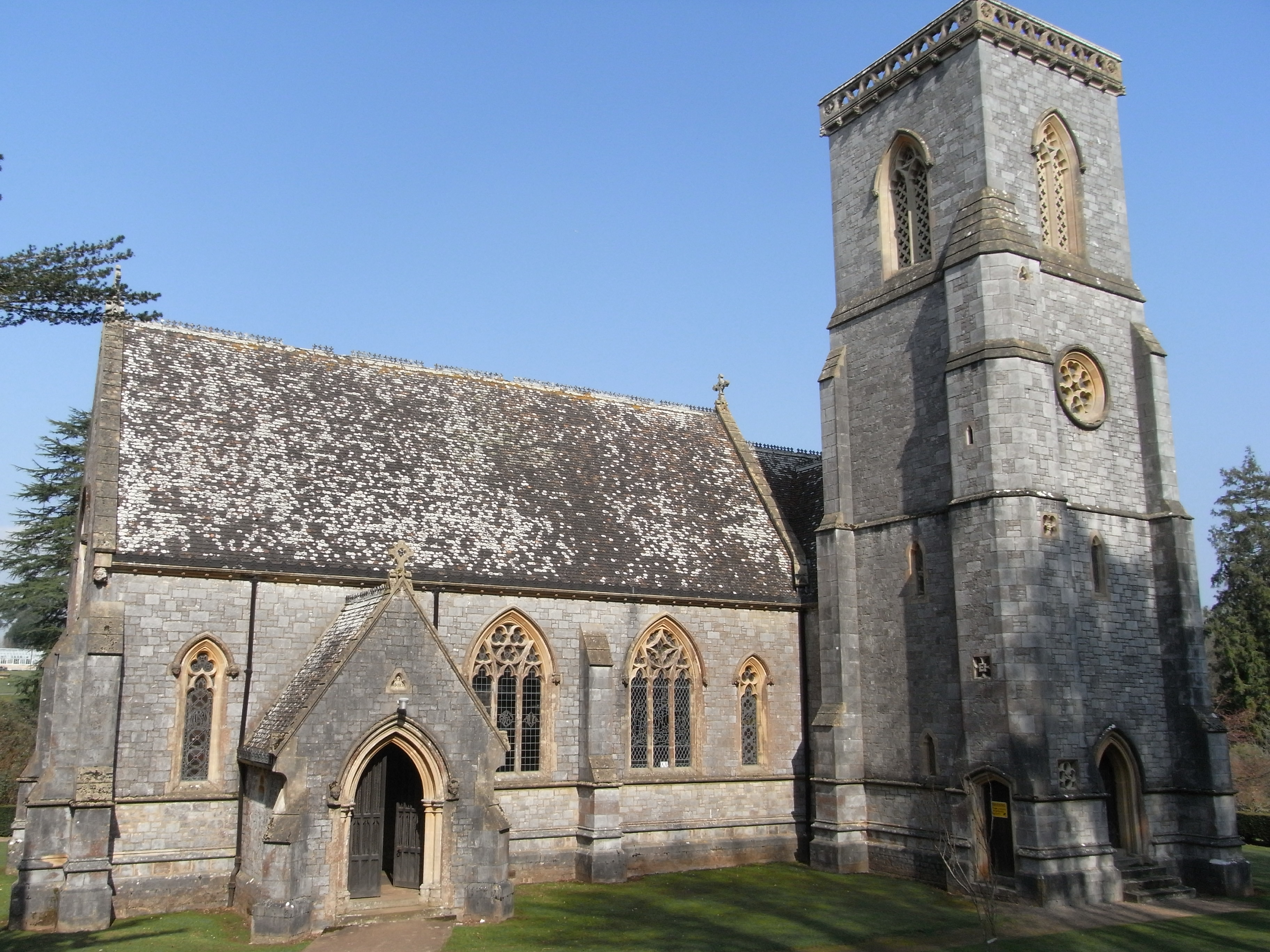
St Mary, Bicton, Devon. Built for the Rolle family in 1850.

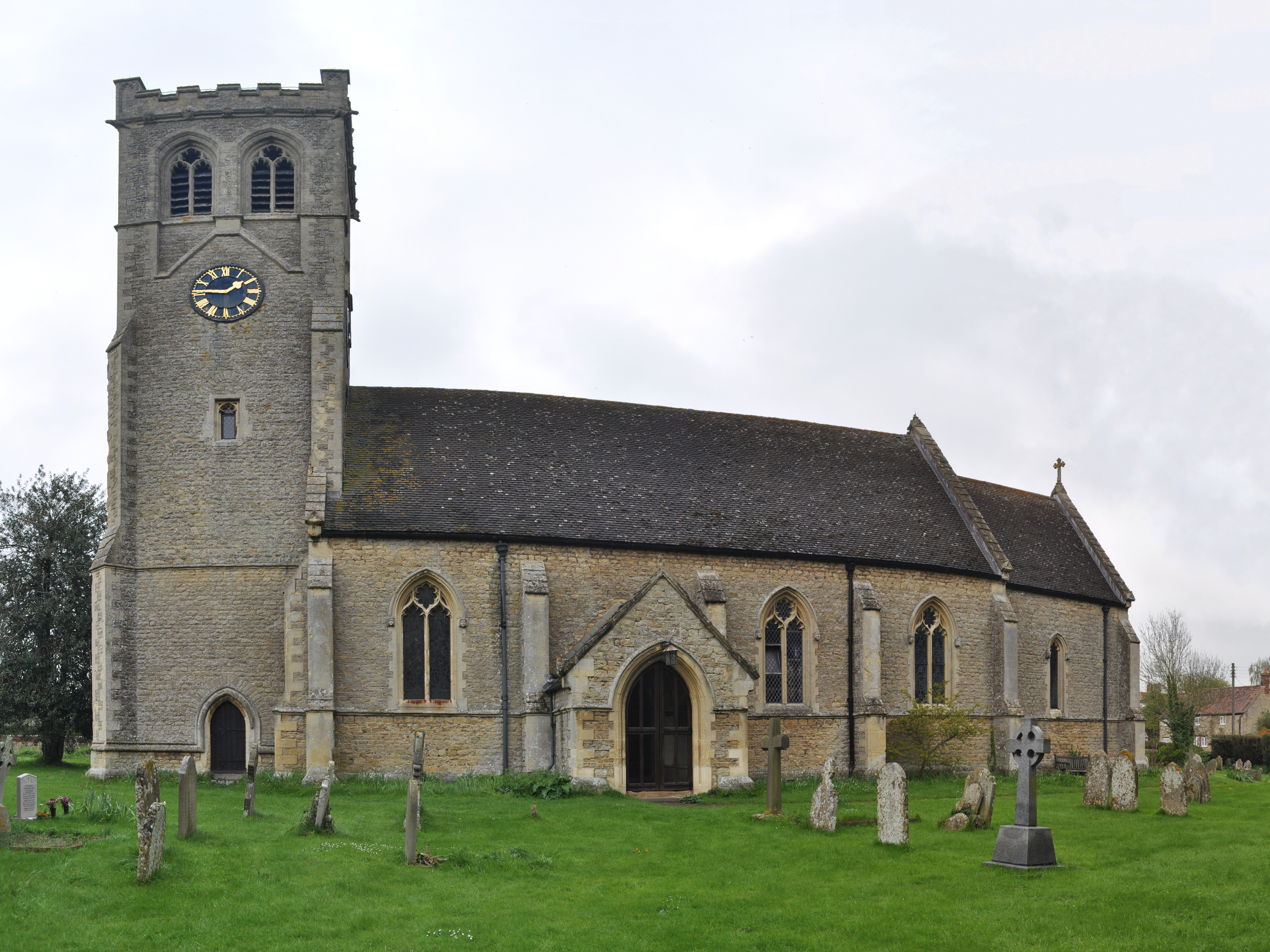
St James' Little Milton, Oxfordshire.

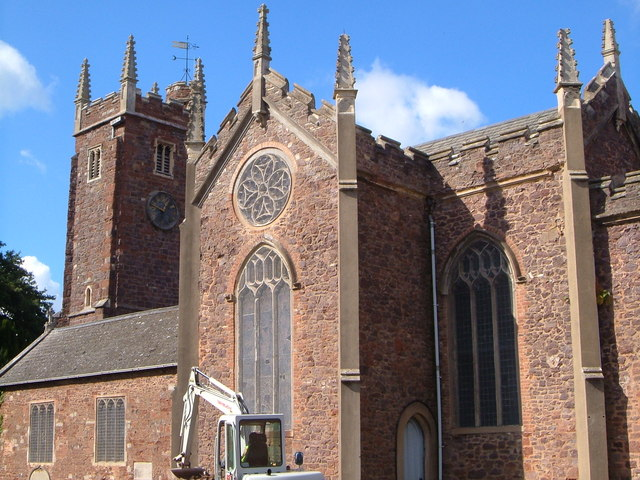
St Thomas the Apostle, St Thomas, Exeter

== See also ==
- List of British architects
