= Appledore, Mid Devon =

Village in Devon, England

Coordinates: 50.9206°N 3.3302°W

Appledore
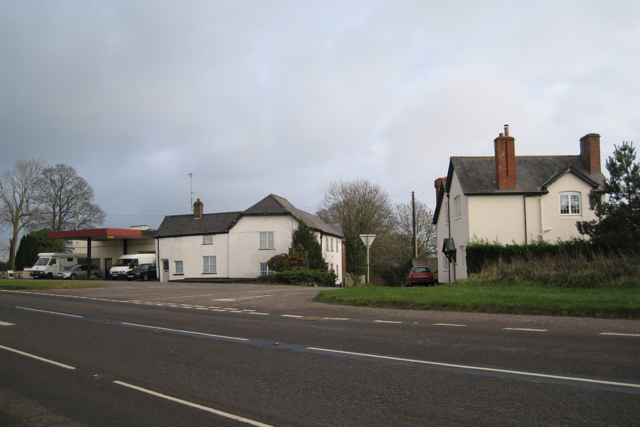

- Location within Devon
- OS grid reference: ST066143
- District: Mid Devon
- Shire county: Devon
- Region: South West
- Country: England
- Sovereign state: United Kingdom
- Post town: CULLOMPTON
- Postcode district: EX15
- UK Parliament: Tiverton and Minehead

Appledore is a small village near Uffculme in Devon, England, about 7 miles (11 kilometres) east of Tiverton.

Appledore was listed in the Domesday Book of 1086.
