= Acland baronets of Columb John (1644) =

Acland Baronets, of Columb John
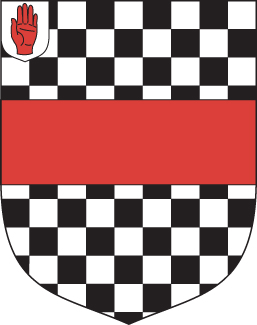
- Motto: Inébranlable (Unshakable)
- Arms: Chequy argent and sable a fess gules
- Crest: A Man's Hand apaumée couped at the wrist in a Glove lying fesswise to the sinister thereon a Falcon perched all proper jessed and belled Or

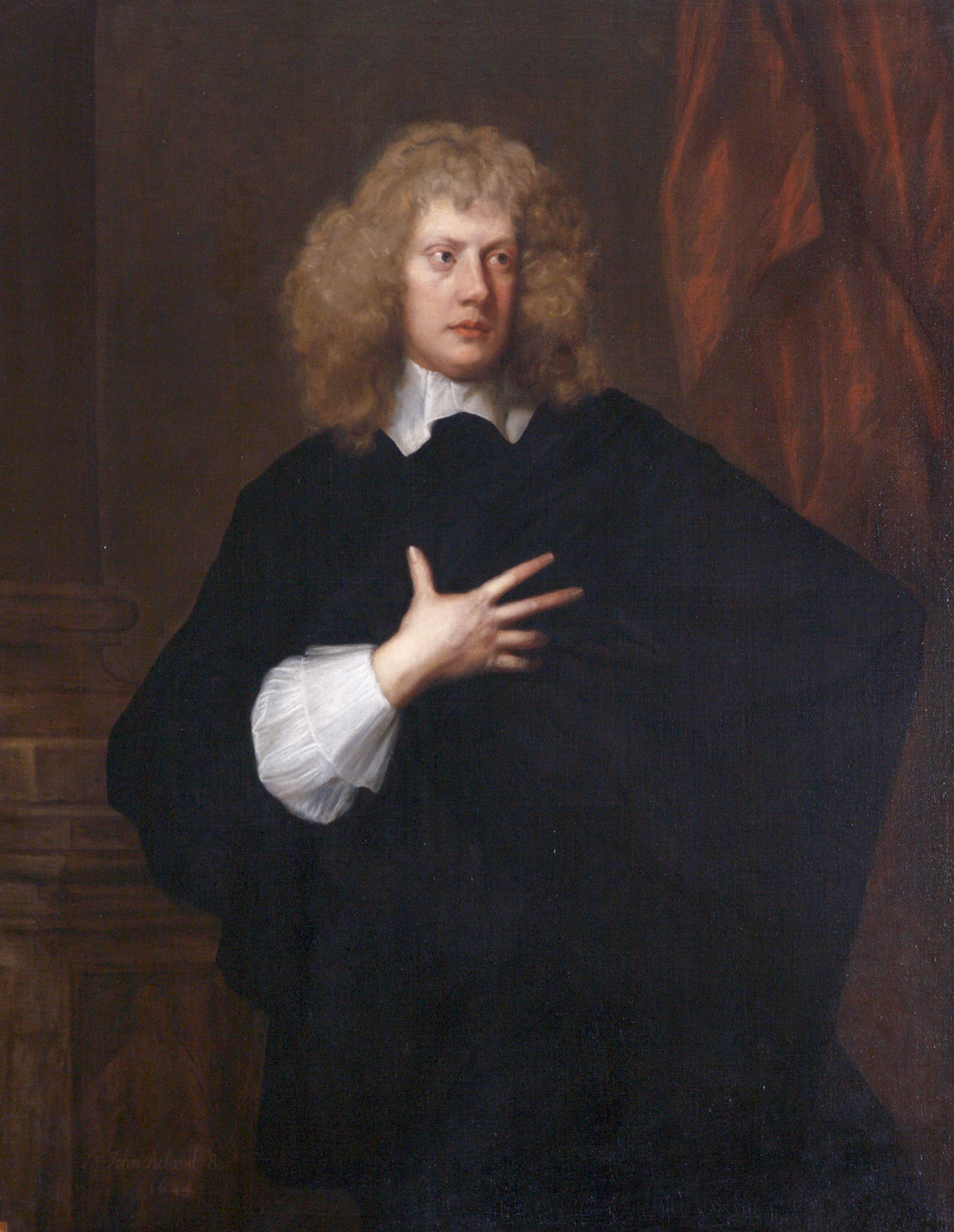
Sir John Acland, 1st Baronet of Colum John. Portrait c. 1644 by Robert Walker (1599–1658), collection of National Trust, Killerton House

Sir Thomas Dyke Acland, 10th Baronet of Colum John

The Acland Baronetcy, of Colum John (modern: Columbjohn, near Broadclyst) in the County of Devon, was created in the Baronetage of England on 24 June 1644 for John Acland, a supporter of Charles I. The letters patent were then lost in the confusion of the Civil War.

He was succeeded by his son, the 2nd Baronet; he died as a minor and was succeeded by his younger brother, the 3rd Baronet. On his death the title passed to his son, the 4th Baronet. He also died young and was succeeded by his uncle, the 5th Baronet, who on 21 January 1678 he was granted new letters patent, confirming him in the title, with the precedence of 1644. Acland later represented Barnstaple and Tiverton in the House of Commons. He was succeeded by his grandson, the 6th Baronet, who sat as Member of Parliament for Barnstaple. When he died the title passed to his son, the 7th Baronet, who married Elizabeth, daughter of Thomas Dyke and built Killerton House as the family seat. He represented Devon and Somerset in Parliament.

He was succeeded by his grandson, the 8th Baronet; he died as a child and was succeeded by his uncle, the 9th Baronet. When he died the title passed to his eldest son, the 10th Baronet, a politician. He was succeeded by his eldest son, the 11th Baronet, also a prominent politician as well as an advocate of educational reforms. On his death the title passed to his eldest son, the 12th Baronet, a Liberal politician who held minor ministerial office under William Ewart Gladstone. He died childless and was succeeded by his younger brother, the 13th Baronet, again a Liberal politician who like his elder brother held minor ministerial office. His eldest son, the 14th Baronet, was another Liberal politician and served as Financial Secretary to the Treasury, and as Parliamentary Under-Secretary of State for Foreign Affairs. On his death the title passed to his eldest son, the 15th Baronet. He was one of the founder members of the socialist Common Wealth Party. As of 2026 the title is held by his grandson, the 17th Baronet, who succeeded his father in 2009.

== Acland baronets of Columb John (1644) ==
- Sir John Acland, 1st Baronet (c. 1591 – 1647), English landowner, was the only son of Arthur Acland. Pricked High Sheriff of Devon in 1641, he fought as a Royalist during the English Civil War. He was created a baronet for his service in 1644, but the letters patent were either lost or did not pass the seals; a new grant was made in 1677/8 to the 5th Baronet confirming the 1644 creation. He surrendered to the Parliamentarians when Thomas Fairfax captured Exeter in 1646 and composed for his estate. Upon his death in 1647, he was succeeded by his eldest son Francis.
- Sir Francis Acland, 2nd Baronet (died 1649) was the eldest son of the 1st Baronet He succeeded his father in 1647, and dying unmarried in 1649, was succeeded by his brother John.
- Sir John Acland, 3rd Baronet (died 1655) was the second son of the 1st Baronet. He succeeded his elder brother in 1649. In 1654, he married Margaret, daughter of Denys Rolle. They had two children: a daughter, Margaret (died 1691), married John Arundell, 2nd Baron Arundell of Trerice in 1675, and a son, Arthur (b. 1654), who succeeded to the baronetcy when Sir John died in 1655.
- Sir Arthur Acland, 4th Baronet (1655–1672) was the only son of the 3rd Baronet. He matriculated at Exeter College, Oxford on 27 July 1669. Sir Arthur died as a minor in 1672, unmarried, and was succeeded by his uncle Hugh.

=== Acland baronets of Columb John (1678) ===
- Sir Hugh Acland, 1st/5th Baronet (died 1714), uncle
- Sir Hugh Acland, 2nd/6th Baronet (1696–1728), grandson
- Sir Thomas Dyke Acland, 3rd/7th Baronet (1722–1785), eldest son, known on his estates as "Sir Thomas his Honour".
- Sir John Dyke Acland, 4th/8th Baronet (1778–1785), grandson, "Little Sir John", died aged 7.
- Sir Thomas Dyke Acland, 5th/9th Baronet (1752–1794), uncle, as his father known on his estates as "Sir Thomas his Honour".
- Sir Thomas Dyke Acland, 6th/10th Baronet (1787–1871), son
- Sir Thomas Dyke Acland, 7th/11th Baronet (1809–1898), son
- Sir (Charles) Thomas Dyke Acland, 8th/12th Baronet (1842–1919), son
- Sir Arthur Herbert Dyke Acland, 9th/13th Baronet (1847–1926), brother
- Sir Francis Dyke Acland, 10th/14th Baronet (1874–1939), son
- Sir Richard Dyke Acland, 11th/15th Baronet (1906–1990), son
- Sir John Dyke Acland, 12th/16th Baronet (1939–2009), son
- Sir Dominic Dyke Acland, 13th/17th Baronet (born 1962), son

The heir apparent is the present holder's eldest son, Patrick Acland (born 1993).

== Extended family ==
- Sir Wroth Palmer Acland, son of Arthur Palmer Acland, younger son of the 6th Baronet, was a lieutenant-general in the army.
- John Acland, younger son of the 6th Baronet, was a cleric and writer on social issues.
- Colonel John Dyke Acland, eldest son of the 7th Baronet and father of the 8th Baronet, fought in the American Revolutionary War.
- Arthur Nugent Floyer-Acland (1885–1980), son of John Edward Acland, son of Arthur Henry Dyke Troyte (who assumed the surname of Troyte in lieu of his patronymic by royal licence in 1852), second son of the 10th Baronet, was a lieutenant-general in the army.
- Edward Leopold Dyke Acland (1878–1968), grandson of Reverend Peter Leopold Dyke Acland, fifth son of the 10th Baronet, was a rear-admiral in the Royal Navy.
- The Right Reverend Richard Dyke Acland, grandson of Reverend Peter Leopold Dyke Acland, fifth son of the 10th Baronet, was a noted clergyman.
- John Barton Arundell Acland (1823–1904), sixth son of the 10th Baronet, was a member of the New Zealand Legislative Council. His fourth son, Sir Hugh Thomas Dyke Acland (1874–1956), was a prominent surgeon in New Zealand. His son Sir Hugh John "Jack" Dyke Acland (1904–1981) was a member of the New Zealand House of Representatives.
