= John Acland (died 1620) =

English knight, landowner, philanthropist and MP

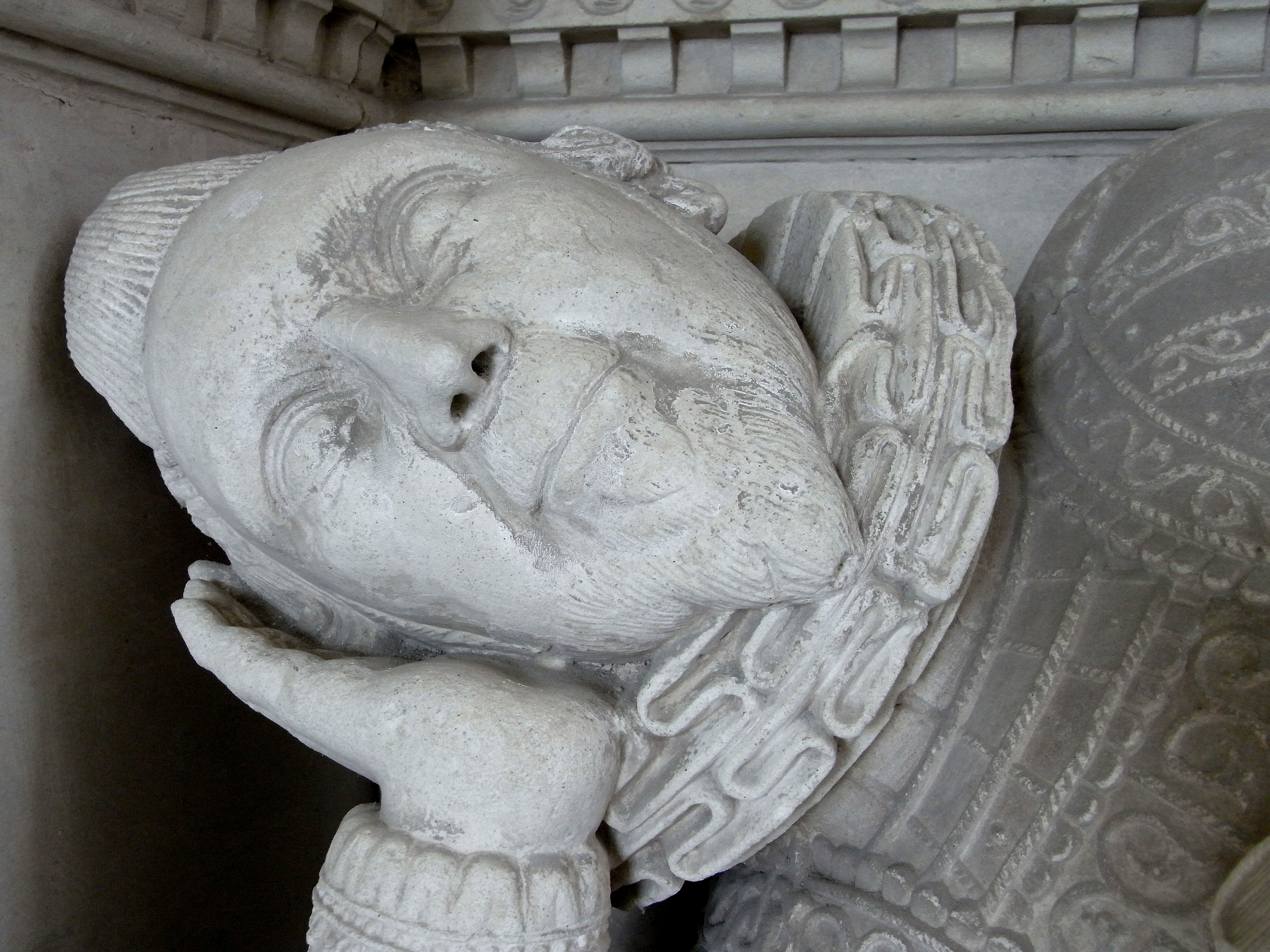
Detail from Acland's recumbent effigy on his monument in Broadclyst Church, Devon

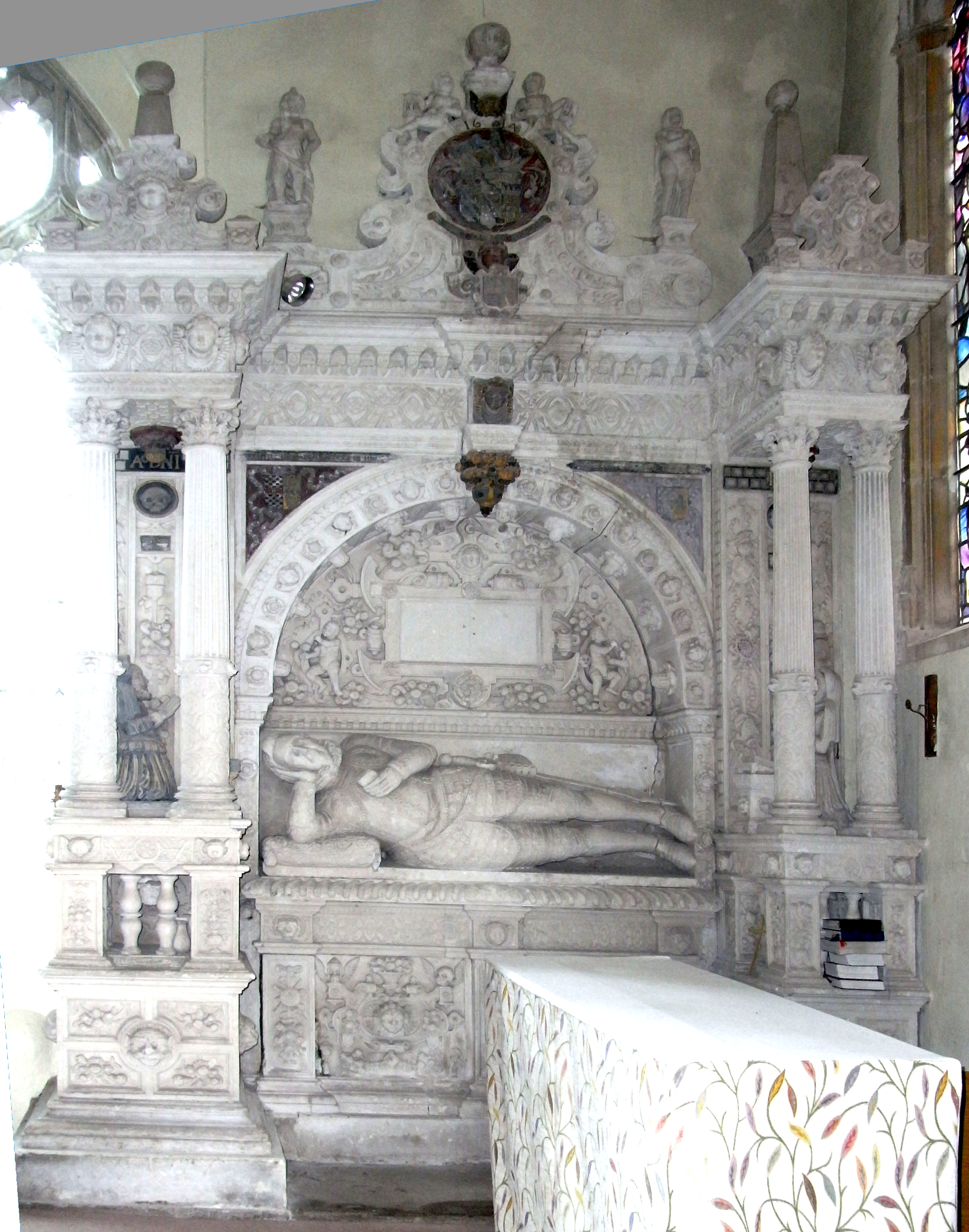
Acland's monument, Broadclyst Church

Arms of Acland: Chequy argent and sable, a fesse gules

Sir John Acland (c. 1552 – 1620) of Columb John in the parish of Broadclyst, Devon, was an English knight, landowner, philanthropist, Member of Parliament and Sheriff of Devon. He was one of John Prince's Worthies of Devon.

== Origins ==
He was the second son of John Acland (died 1553), of Acland in the parish of Landkey, Devon, by his wife Mary Redcliff, daughter and co-heiress of Hugh Redcliff of Stepney near London. He is said by Prince (c. 1697) to have been the favourite son of his mother, who thus made him heir to her lands in and about London. His elder brother was Hugh Acland (died 1622), who inherited the paternal estate of Acland, which he modernised in 1591 as attested by a surviving date stone, where he remained throughout his life.

== Career ==
Acland was appointed to the county bench as a Justice of the Peace in 1583 and was Sheriff of Devon for 1608–09. He was elected Member of Parliament firstly for Saltash, in 1586. He was knighted by King James I on 15 March 1604 in the Tower of London, and at a by-election on 27 January 1607, in the first parliament of the reign, became MP for Devon.

== Marriages ==
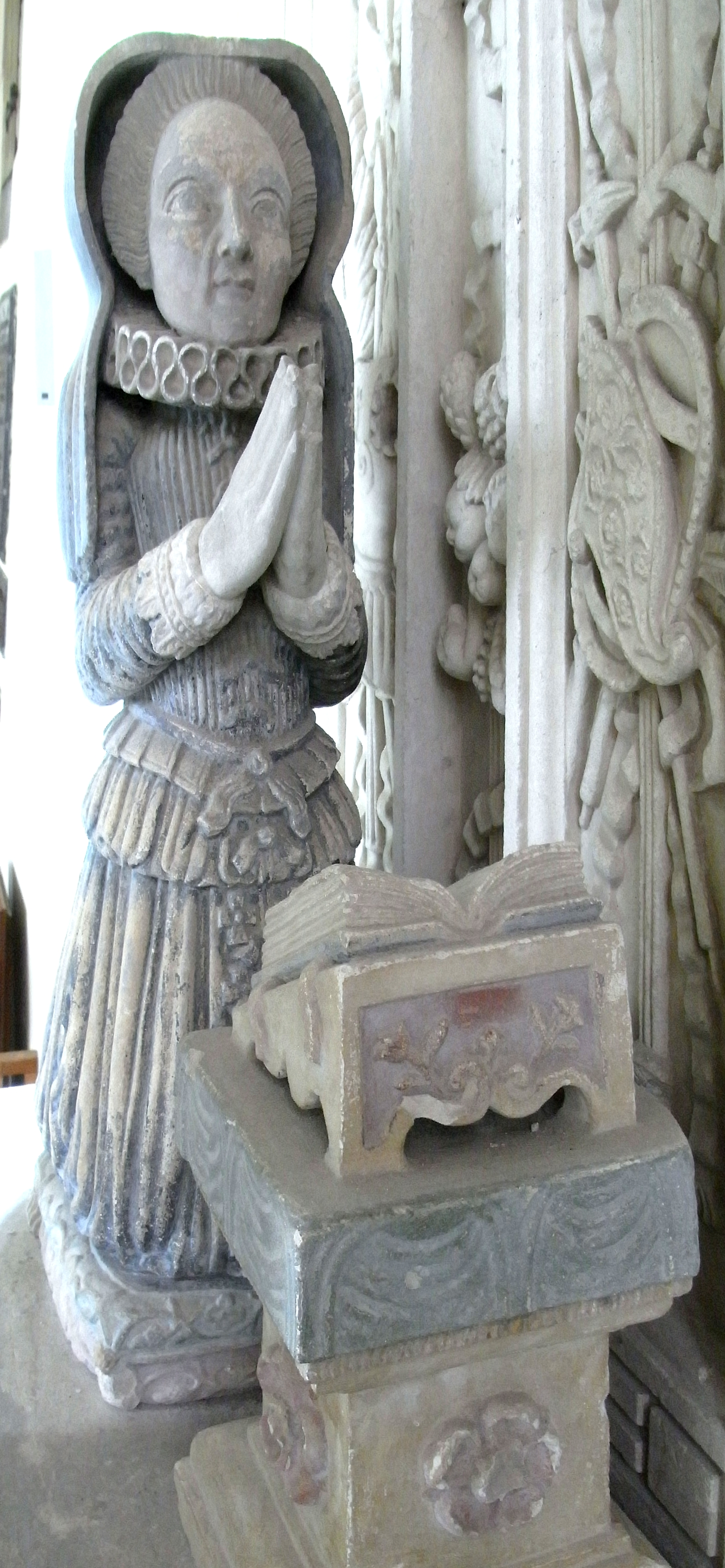
Effigy of Acland's wife Elizabeth Rolle, in Broadclyst Church

Acland married twice, but left no surviving children. His first wife was Elizabeth Rolle, a daughter of the wealthy George Rolle, of Stevenstone near Great Torrington in Devon, and the widow of Robert Mallet, of Woolleigh, Beaford, near Great Torrington in the same county. During Elizabeth's lifetime the couple lived at Woolleigh. It was probably due to Elizabeth's wealth that Acland was able to purchase the manor of Columb John in the parish of Broadclyst. On his monument in Broadclyst Church a kneeling effigy representing Elizabeth Rolle kneels by his head, below a heraldic escutcheon displaying the arms of Rolle. By Elizabeth he had only one child, a daughter named Dorothy who died an infant.

After Elizabeth died, Acland married Margaret Portman, another "vastly rich" widow, a daughter of Sir Henry Portman, of Orchard Portman in Somerset and the widow of Sir Gabriel Hawley (died 1604) of Buckland Priory (Buckland Sororum), in the parish of Dursley, Somerset, High Sheriff of Somerset in 1584. The marriage was childless. On Acland's monument in Broadclyst Church a kneeling effigy representing Margaret Portman kneels by his feet below a heraldic escutcheon displaying the arms of Portman.

== Lands acquired ==
He purchased the manor of Columb John in the parish of Broadclyst, about 32 miles south-east of Acland, where he re-built the old manor house and its domestic chapel, which he endowed with the annual sum of £25 in eternity "for the encouragement of a chaplain, to preach and read prayers in it every Lord's day".

The nearby manor of Killerton, adjacent to Columb John, was not purchased at this time, but by Acland's eldest nephew Sir Arthur Acland (died 1610) of Acland, whose son Sir John Acland, 1st Baronet (died 1647) deserted Acland and moved his residence to Columb John. Killerton was first used as a residence for Sir Arthur's widow Eleanor Mallet (daughter and heiress of Robert Mallet of Woolleigh, whose wife was Elizabeth Rolle who remarried to Sir John Acland (died 1620)). Killerton became the family's chief seat after 1672, when the 1st baronet's fourth son Sir Hugh Acland, 5th Baronet (died 1713) altered and enlarged the house in 1680 and abandoned Columb John, of which all that survives today is the Elizabethan gateway. His descendants later built the surviving Georgian Killerton House.

== Death and burial ==
Acland died on 14 February 1620, and was buried in Broad Clyst church, where a monument he had commissioned himself, dated 1613, survives in Broadclyst Church, showing the sculpted figures of himself and his wives. Since he died childless, his heir was his 70-year-old elder brother Hugh Acland (died 1622) of Acland.

== Philanthropy ==
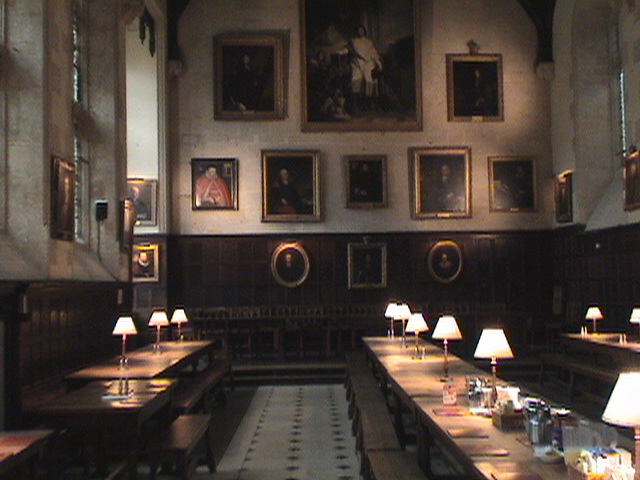
Dining Hall, Exeter College, Oxford, built in 1618, largely financed by Acland

His charitable gifts were numerous. He settled on the mayor and city council of Exeter the rectorial endowments of two parishes in the South Hams, so that the annual proceeds might be distributed among the poor in Exeter and in other parts of the county. He largely financed a new hall, with cellars underneath, at Exeter College, Oxford, shortly before his death, at a cost of about £800 of the total £1,000 building cost. Two scholarships were also founded by him at the college. He gave money to buy bread for the poor in each of the 27 parishes in which he held land and an inscription to Sir John was erected in Pilton Church, near Acland, which is transcribed in Dean Milles' Questionnaire thus:

Here Sr John Acland to the poor's a friend,
In giving bread noe times to have an end,
Sixpence a week by him to us is measured,
A crown for him in Heaven's laid up and treasured

== Monument ==
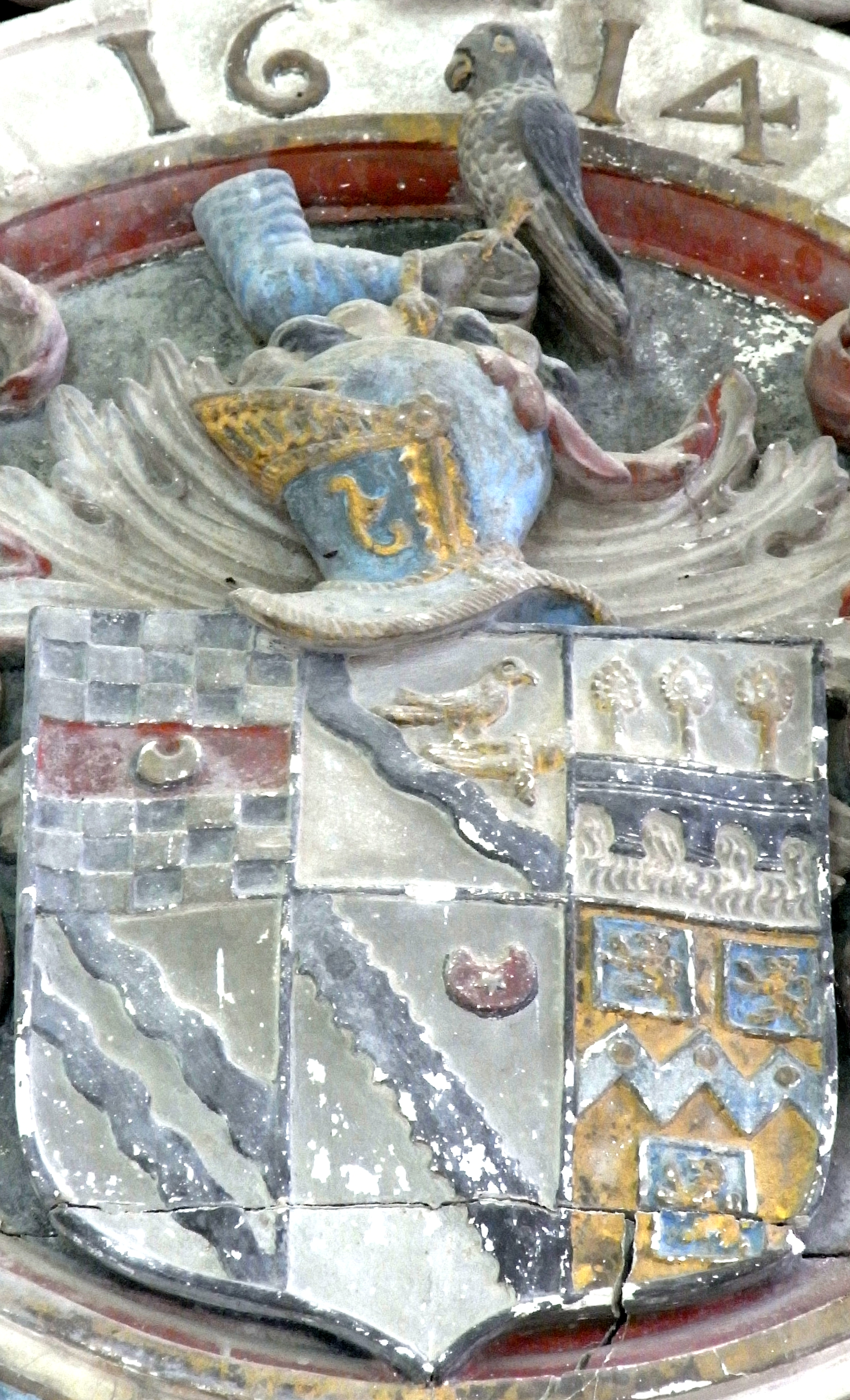
Acland's Heraldic achievement

Sir John Acland's monument in Broadclyst Church was described by Pevsner as "one of the most sumptuous Jacobean monuments in Devon and the most splendid of a related group". It was commissioned by Sir John during his lifetime and bears the dates 1613 and 1614. He lies recumbent, in full armour, propped up on his right elbow, with his two widows kneeling at prayer at his head and feet. It was probably constructed by John Deymond, an Exeter mason. The Renaissance style comprises columns, strapwork, cartouches, obelisks, fruit and putti It displays the following Latin inscriptions: Anno Domini 1613; Mors janua vitae (Death is the gateway to life) and the well-known Mors mihi lucrum (Death to me is reward); Post tenebras spero lucem (After darkness I hope for light); Caro mea requiescit in spe (May my flesh rest in hope); A Deo omnis victoria (All victory comes from God). A rectangular space above his effigy which should have contained a marble tablet inscribed with his epitaph remains blank, as it was in 1697 when described by John Prince.

=== Armorials ===
At the top of the monument is a heraldic achievement of Sir John Acland (died 1620), showing an escutcheon quarterly of 6:

- 1st:Acland, with a crescent or for difference of a 2nd son;
- 2nd: Argent, above a bend wavy sable a man's hand couped at the wrist in a glove lying fessways thereon a falcon perched, all or;
- 3rd:
- 4th: Argent, two bendlets wavy sable (Stapledon of Annery)
- 5th: Argent a bend engrailed sable (Radcliffe), as borne by Robert Radcliffe, 1st Earl of Sussex (died 1542);
- 6th: Or, on a fesse dancetté between three billets azure each charged with a lion rampant of the first three bezants (Rolle).

Crest above: a man's hand couped at the wrist in a glove lying fessways thereon a falcon perched, all proper (Acland)

== Sources ==
- Acland, Anne. A Devon Family: The Story of the Aclands. London and Chichester: Phillimore, 1981
- Dictionary of National Biography, London: Smith, Elder & Co. 1885–1900, "Acland, John (died 1613)"
- Hasler, P.W. (ed.), The History of Parliament: the House of Commons 1558–1603, 1981, biography of Sir John Acland
- Prince, John, (1643–1723) The Worthies of Devon, 1810 edition, pp. 1–6 biography of Sir John Acland
- Venning, Tim & Paul Hunneyball's biography of Sir John Acland, published in: The History of Parliament: the House of Commons 1604–1629, ed. Andrew Thrush and John P. Ferris, 2010.
- Vivian, Lt.Col. J.L., (Ed.) The Visitations of the County of Devon: Comprising the Heralds' Visitations of 1531, 1564 & 1620, Exeter, 1895, pp. 3–8, pedigree of Acland.
