= John Acland (died 1553) =

English landowner (died 1553)

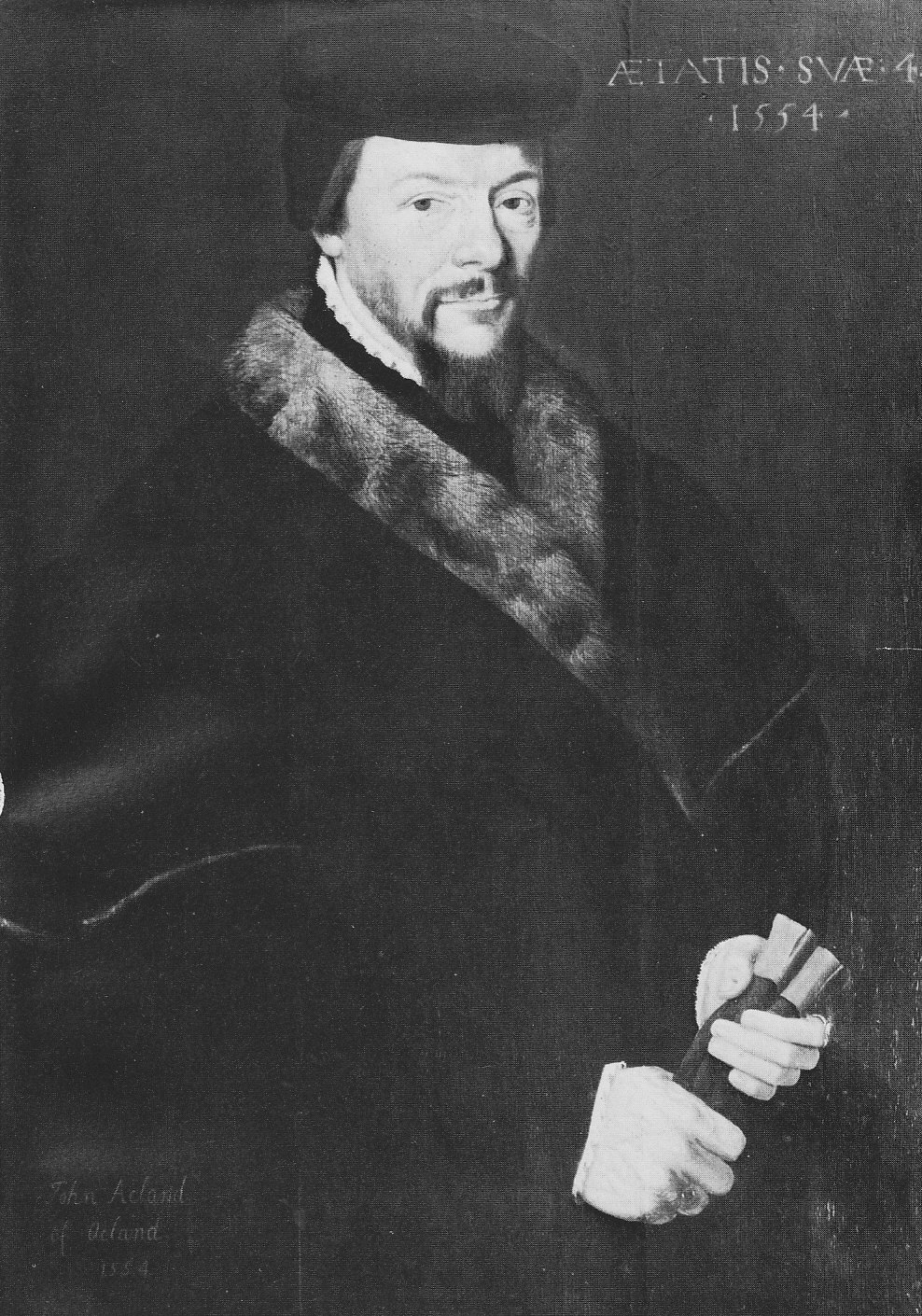
John Acland (died 1553) of Acland. Portrait by unknown artist. Collection of Killerton House, Devon.

Arms of Acland: Chequy argent and sable, a fesse gules

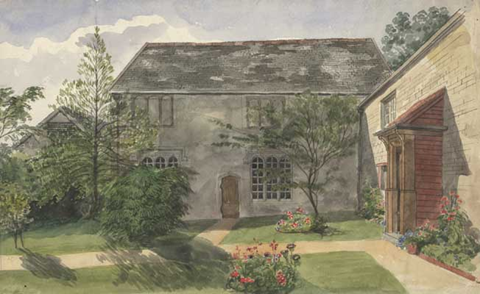
Acland Barton, 1851 watercolour by Edward Ashworth showing the mediaeval chapel wing

John Acland (died 1553) was described as "the first of the [Acland] family to emerge from the shadows of history as a visible human being". His great-grandson was the Royalist colonel Sir John Acland, 1st Baronet (died 1648) of Columb John. Little if anything is known of his life and career, he was possibly a minor Tudor official, but he is chiefly remembered for his surviving portrait which is displayed at Killerton House, the earliest surviving image of an Acland and one of the most cherished in that family's former collection, now owned by the National Trust.

He was seated at Acland Barton in the parish of Landkey, near Barnstaple in North Devon, which had been the family's seat since 1155. The Acland family is believed to have migrated to England from Flanders soon after the Norman Conquest and were in the late 20th century probably the oldest surviving landed family in Devon, which by the 19th century possessed a huge estate in the West Country of almost 40,000 acres.

== Origins ==
He was the eldest son and heir of the fifth John Acland of Acland by his wife Elizabeth Cruwys, daughter of John Cruwys of Cruwys Morchard, Devon, another ancient Devon family that survives today and still occupies its ancient manor house. The fifth John had pre-deceased his father, the fourth John Acland (died 1539), and thus this John (the sixth) inherited his grandfather's estates at the age of about 17.

== Marriage and children ==
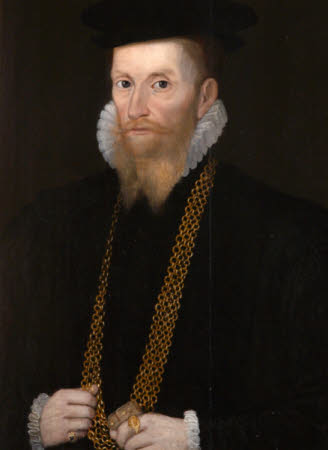
Portrait of Hugh Radcliff of Stepney, Acland's father-in-law. Collection of Killerton House, Devon

John Acland married Margaret Radcliff, a daughter and co-heiress of Hugh Radcliff of Stepney. They had the following children:

- Hugh Acland (c. 1543–1622) of Acland, eldest son and heir, Sheriff of Devon in 1611. At the age of about 70 he became heir to his wealthy and childless younger brother, Sir John Acland of Columb John, Broadclyst. He was buried in Landkey Church on 22 May 1622.
- Sir John Acland (died 14 February 1620), knighted at the Tower of London 15 November 1603/4, MP for Devon in 1604, Sheriff of Devon in 1608. He purchased the estate of Columb John in the parish of Broadclyst, Devon. He is one of John Prince's Worthies of Devon.
- Gertrude Acland, married Guy Bonvile of Street, Somerset.
- Dorothy Acland, married Robert Smith of Mucheney, Somerset.

After Acland's death, Margaret remarried to John Brett of Whitestaunton.

== Lands held ==
In addition to his estate of Acland, by the 1550s John Acland held lands in the parishes of Loxbeare, Chittlehampton, Tedburn St Mary, High Bray and Swimbridge.

== Death and burial ==
The date 1554 on Acland's portrait is erroneous, probably a later addition. He died on 5 October 1553 and was buried in Landkey church. His will was proved by his widow on 1 June 1554 in the Consistory Court of the Bishop of Exeter.

== Sources ==
- Acland, Anne. A Devon Family. The Story of the Aclands. London and Chichester: Phillimore, 1981. ISBN 0-85033-356-3
- Vivian, Lt.Col. J.L., (Ed.) The Visitations of the County of Devon: Comprising the Heralds' Visitations of 1531, 1564 & 1620. Exeter, 1895.
