= Columbjohn =

Historic estate in Devon, England

50.7891°N 3.4786°W

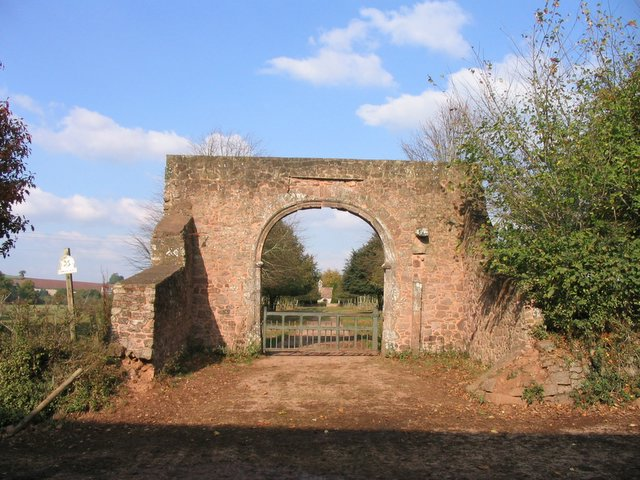
Archway, circa 1590, of the former gatehouse of the demolished Acland family mansion house of Columb John. St John's Chapel is in the distance.

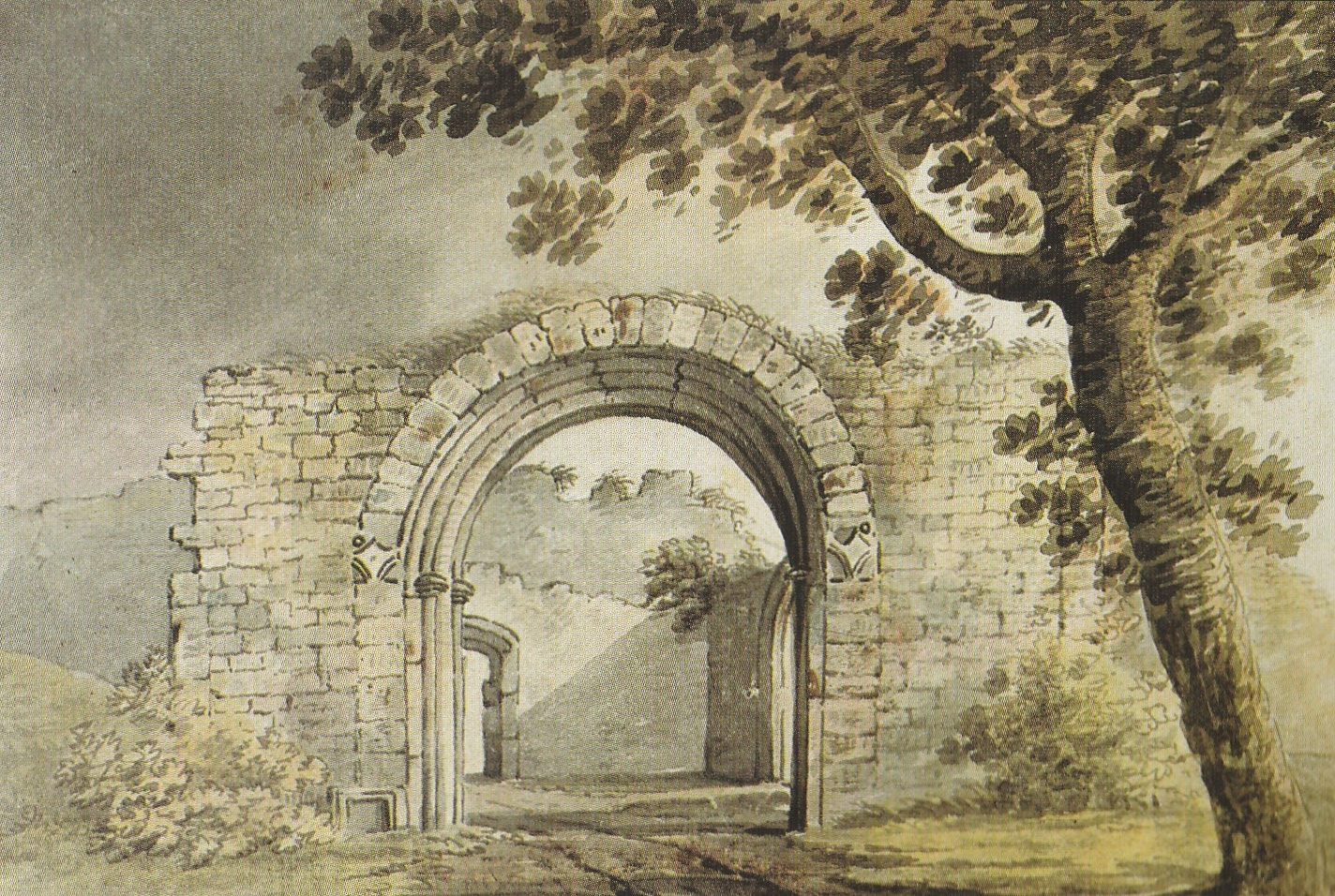
"Gateway at Columb John", 1800 watercolour by Rev. John Swete (d.1821)

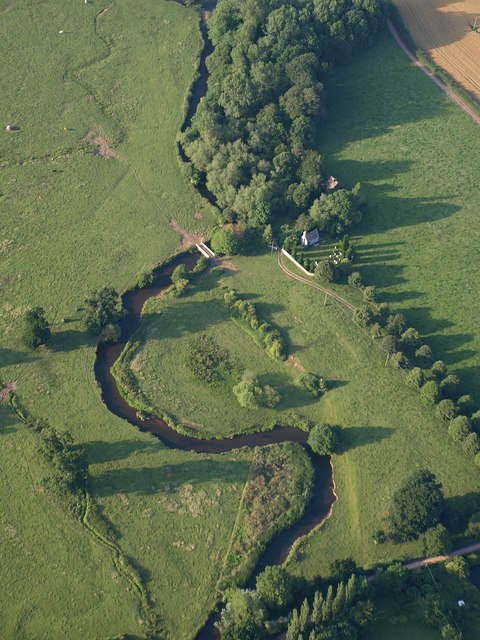
The site of the former mansion house at Columb John, by the chapel on the bank of the River Culm. Looking north.

Columb John (today "Columbjohn") in the parish of Broadclyst in Devon, England, is a historic estate that was briefly the seat of the prominent Acland family which later moved to the adjacent estate of Killerton.

Nothing of the structure of the Acland mansion house survives except the arch to the gatehouse, dated about 1590, and the private chapel, restored in 1851. The site of the former mansion house is one mile due west of Killerton House.

== Descent of the estate ==
The Devon Domesday Book tenant-in-chief of Colum in 1068 was Fulchere, also known as "Fulchere the Bowman", one of the king's lesser tenants. He held it in demesne. It passed to the Culme family and the estate was subsequently held by Reginald de Clifford. By the 13th century it was held by the Prideaux family until the Courtenay Earls of Devon acquired the estate from Sir John Prideaux. The estate was then granted to Richard Bampfield who died in 1430 with no male children, and thus the estate escheated to Thomas de Courtenay, 5th/13th Earl of Devon. It then passed through that family until Henry Courtenay, 1st Marquess of Exeter, whose estates were forfeited to the Crown following his attainder and execution in 1538.

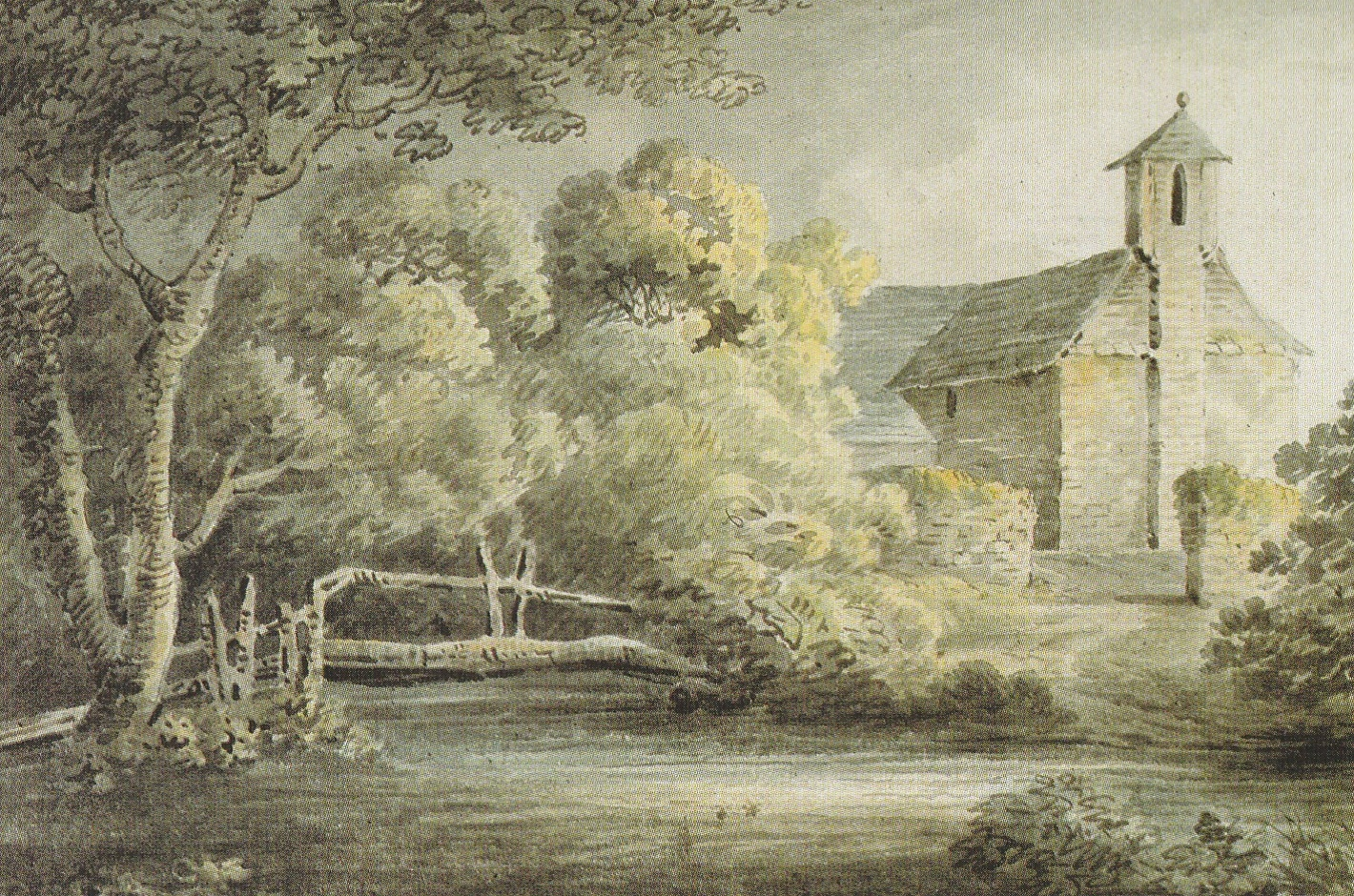
"Chapel to Cullomb John", 1800 watercolour by Rev. John Swete (d.1821) of the private chapel built and endowed by Sir John Acland

The estate was then granted by the Crown to George Basset (c.1524-c.1580), of Tehidy, and by the early 17th century it was held by the Acland family. Sir John Acland (c.1552-1620) built a new house there and next to it erected a private chapel which survives today as "St John's Chapel" having been restored or rebuilt in 1851. It is a grade II listed building. The estate was inherited by Hugh Acland (c.1543–1622) (elder brother and heir of John). He was predeceased by his eldest son and heir, Sir Arthur Acland, who therefore never inherited Acland, but who was granted by his father the estate of Columb John.

Arthur's son, Sir John Acland, 1st Baronet abandoned the ancient family seat of Acland in favour of Columb John, which he had inherited from his great-uncle Sir John Acland (d.1620). He also purchased the adjoining estate of Killerton. Before the start of the Civil War he was appointed by King Charles I as one of 28 Commissioners of Array for Devon, in which role he raised two regiments for the King. The mansion house served as a garrison for Royalist troops, and played a key role for that side as described by Clarendon in his History of the Rebellion:

"Devonshire was left in a very unsafe posture: there being only a small party at Columb-John, a house of sir John Ackland's, three miles off Exeter, to control the power of that city, where the Earl of Stamford was; and to dispute not only with any commotion that might happen in the country, but with any power that might arrive by sea".

The Royalist position improved in 1643 and Columb John ceased to be an isolated Royalist outpost when Prince Maurice and his army reached the area in the summer of that year. Acland was awarded a baronetcy, of Columb John in the County of Devonshire, and was appointed Sheriff of Devon by King Charles I in 1644. In 1645 Sir John was one of those present in the City of Exeter during the siege by Parliamentarian forces commanded by Generals Cromwell and Fairfax, who made Columb John their headquarters during the siege. The Parliamentarian troops were " a civilised lot, who paid for what they took, and ... knew how to behave like gentlemen even to their enemies. Sir John Acland's wife wrote to Cromwell as follows: "I received such ample testimony of your love when you were pleased to quarter at my house as that I cannot sufficiently express my thankfulness for the same". Whilst quartered at Columb John Cromwell and Fairfax offered very reasonable terms to the City that it surrendered on 13 April 1646 and all civilians and soldiers, including Sir John Acland, were permitted to march out honourably with colours flying, provided they laid down arms and took the national covenant of loyalty to Parliament. Acland was fined heavily for his delinquency, at £1,727 (later tripled), which was the fourth largest fine suffered in Devon.

Upon his death in 1647, he was succeeded by his eldest son Sir Francis Acland, 2nd Baronet, who survived his father only a short time. He died unmarried so the estate passed to his younger brother Sir John Acland, 3rd Baronet (d. 1655). In 1654, he married Margaret Rolle, daughter of Denys Rolle (1614–1638) of Stevenstone. His son and heir, Sir Arthur Acland, 4th Baronet died as a minor in 1672 and was succeeded by his uncle Sir Hugh Acland, 5th Baronet. He demolished the mansion house at Columb John and made adjacent Killerton his principal seat, which house he enlarged, possibly using some of the stonework from Columb John. Columb John thus became merged into the estate of Killerton.
