= Acland, Landkey =

Historic estate in North Devon, England

Coordinates: 51.0749°N 4.0082°W

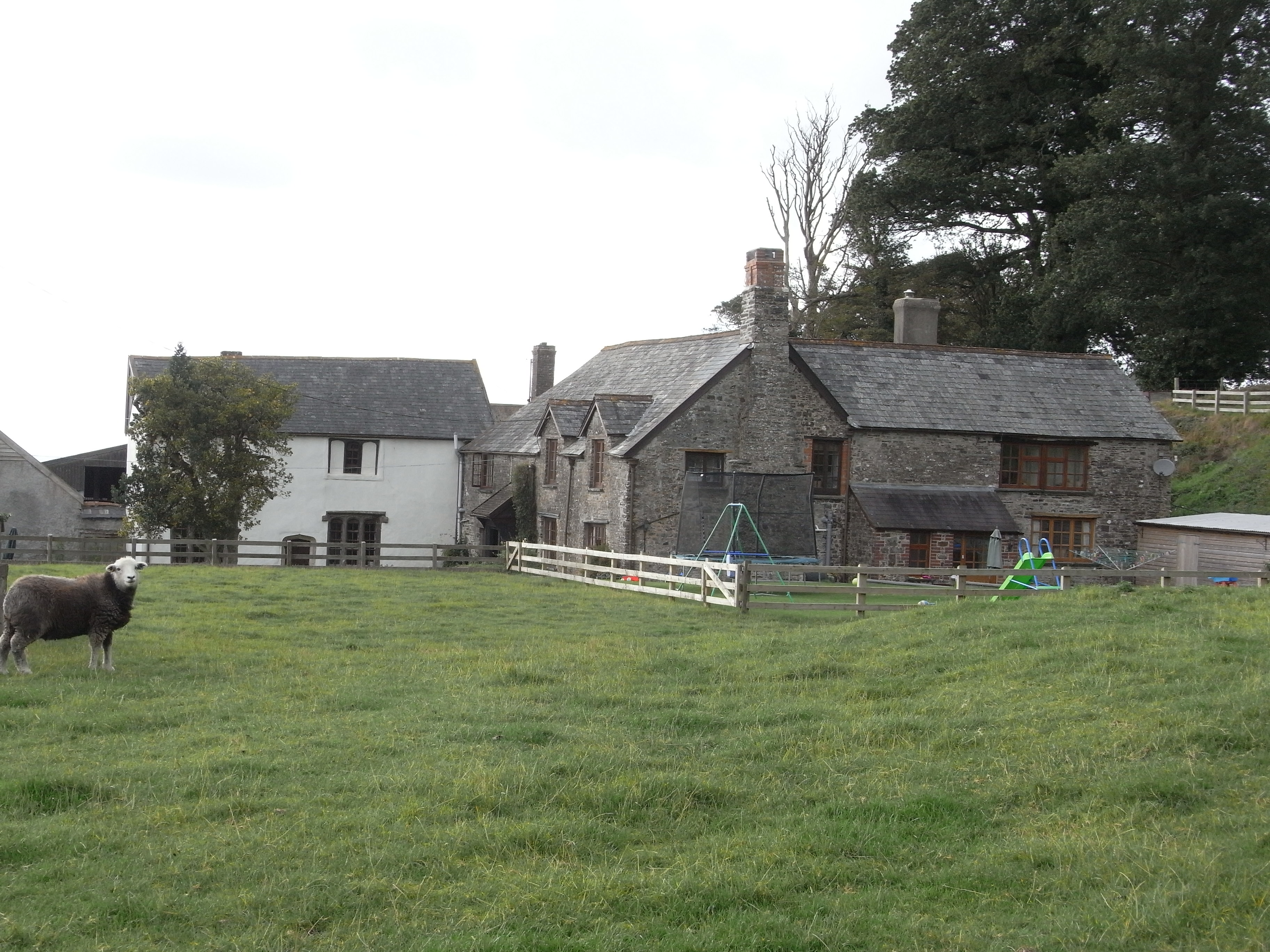
Acland Barton in 2013 with its whitewashed and rendered mediaeval chapel wing

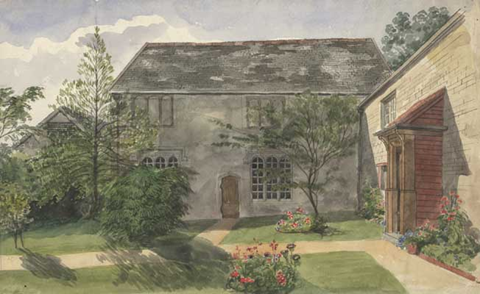
Acland Barton, 1851 watercolour by Edward Ashworth showing the mediaeval chapel wing

Arms of Acland: Chequy argent and sable, a fesse gules

The estate of Acland (alias Accelana, Akeland etc.) in the parish of Landkey, near Barnstaple in North Devon, England, was from 1155 the earliest known seat of the influential and wealthy family of Acland, to which it gave the surname de Acland. It is situated about 3/4 mile north-east of the village of Landkey, from which it is now cut off by the busy A361 North Devon Link Road.

The estate remained the seat of the Aclands until the 17th century, after which it was let to tenants until sold in 1945.

== Description of house ==
The house was completely rebuilt in the 15th century, and included its own private domestic chapel, licensed by the Bishop of Exeter. The date 1591 survives carved onto the wooden porch, and represents the modernisation and rebuilding of the house at that date involving the insertion into the great hall of a ceiling with room above, thus lowering the height of the house's principal room. This work was done by Hugh Acland (1543–1622), who lived at Acland his whole life.

The surviving structure is the main range and west wing of the Tudor house. The hall's wooden screen and screens passage survives. The windows of the main range are later alterations. Acland Barton and Chapel have been listed Grade I on the National Heritage List for England since 1965.

== Descent ==
The estate is likely originally to have been named after its first Anglo-Saxon holder named Acca. The manor's name signifies "Acca's lane". Acca "once owned a sizeable estate in this district", including nearby Accott, 3 miles to the east in the parish of Bishop's Tawton, signifying "Acca's Cott" (Acca's farmstead) (See List of generic forms in place names in Ireland and the United Kingdom). Persons with this name living in the 8th century included three bishops in the Anglo-Saxon Church: Acca of Dunwich (8th century), Acca of Hereford (8th century) and Acca of Hexham (b c. 660 - 740 or 742), or Saint Acca.

The estate was held under the feudal tenure of socage from the manor of Bishop's Tawton (in which was situated the parish of Landkey), one of the possessions of the See of Exeter. The house contained its own domestic chapel, licensed by the Bishop of Exeter.

The Devon historian Risdon (died 1640) stated regarding the parish of Landkey:

In this parish is Acland, pleasantly situated against the south, in the side of a hill, which hath given name to its ancient dwellers, who have continued in that place from king Henry the second unto this present time. Of which lineage, five of the first were called Baldwin...

In the opinion of Hoskins (1981), the early and repeated use of the Flemish first name of Baldwin, suggests that the Acland family probably migrated to England from Flanders soon after the Norman Conquest of 1066. The family's historian Anne Acland (Lady Acland, wife of Sir Richard Thomas Dyke Acland, 15th Baronet (1906–1990)) stated (1981): "However the name is spelt, there is no branch of the enormous family which does not stem from the tree which first took root at Acland Barton". By the end of the 12th century the Aclands of Acland held an estate of about 400 acres of land.

The descent of the estate of Acland as reported by John Acland in the Heraldic Visitation (1531, 1564 or 1620) of Devon was as follows:

- Baldwin Eccelin
- Baldwin Acalan (son)
- William de Acalan (son), who married Sara, daughter and heiress of John de la Pile.
- Baldwin de Akelane (son), living in 1320
- John Akelane (son), who married a certain Agneta, of unrecorded family
- John Akelane of Akelane (son), who married Alicia Hawkridge, daughter and heiress of William Hawkridge of Hawkridge in the parish of Chittlehampton, Devon, about 4½ miles south-east of Acland. The Acland family retained the estate of Hawkridge for many generations and it descended to a junior branch of the family. It was either this John or his father who fought in the Hundred Years' War as recorded by Pole (died 1635) in his list of "Men of best note and which have either in warre or peace bine employed in this countye" as follows:

"John Akland of Akland served in France anno 9 of King Rich 2 (i.e. 1385) which appeareth by his deede made unto c'tain feoffees dated the same year, expressinge a condition for moneys to be raised for payment for his redempcion yf it happened that hee were taken prisoner, and a frustrating of the deed upon his retorne"

- Bawldwin [sic] Akelane (son), who married Joane, daughter and heiress of William Rivertor [sic]. Other sources accept this name as Riverton. (Note: Burke's General Armory (1884), p.859, for example. Today's estate of Riverton in the parish of Swimbridge, is situated 3 miles south-east of Acland, and was owned by the Acland family as is revealed in the 1726 survey of the family's landholdings, where it is listed as "Riverton Manor", comprising several properties let to several tenants.)
- Robert Akelane of Akelane (son), who married Cicely, daughter and co-heiress of Robert Hawkworthy.
- Bawldin [sic] Akelane (son), who married Jone, daughter and co-heiress of Will Prediaux of Adiston, according to the Visitation, although Vivian names her father in his pedigree of Prideaux as Sir John Prideaux of Adeston. According to Risdon, Prideaux of Adeston was in the parish of Holbeton, Devon.
- John Akelane of Akelane (son), who married Elizabeth, daughter of John Fortescue (died 1538) of Sprideston, Brixton, Devon. The Fortescues of Spridleston were a junior branch of the leading Devon family of Fortescue of Whympston in the parish of Modbury, later seated at Filleigh and created Earl Fortescue. His eldest son and heir was John Akeland (died 1539), who predeceased his father, having married Elizabeth, daughter of Thomas Hext of Kingston, Devon. Their son was also named John, who also predeceased his father, having married Elizabeth, daughter of John Cruwys of Cruwys Morchard, Devon, another ancient Devon family. This John's eldest son, also John (died 1553) inherited the Acland estates, while his second son, Anthony Acland (died 1568), was given the estate of Hawkridge where he established his own branch of the family.

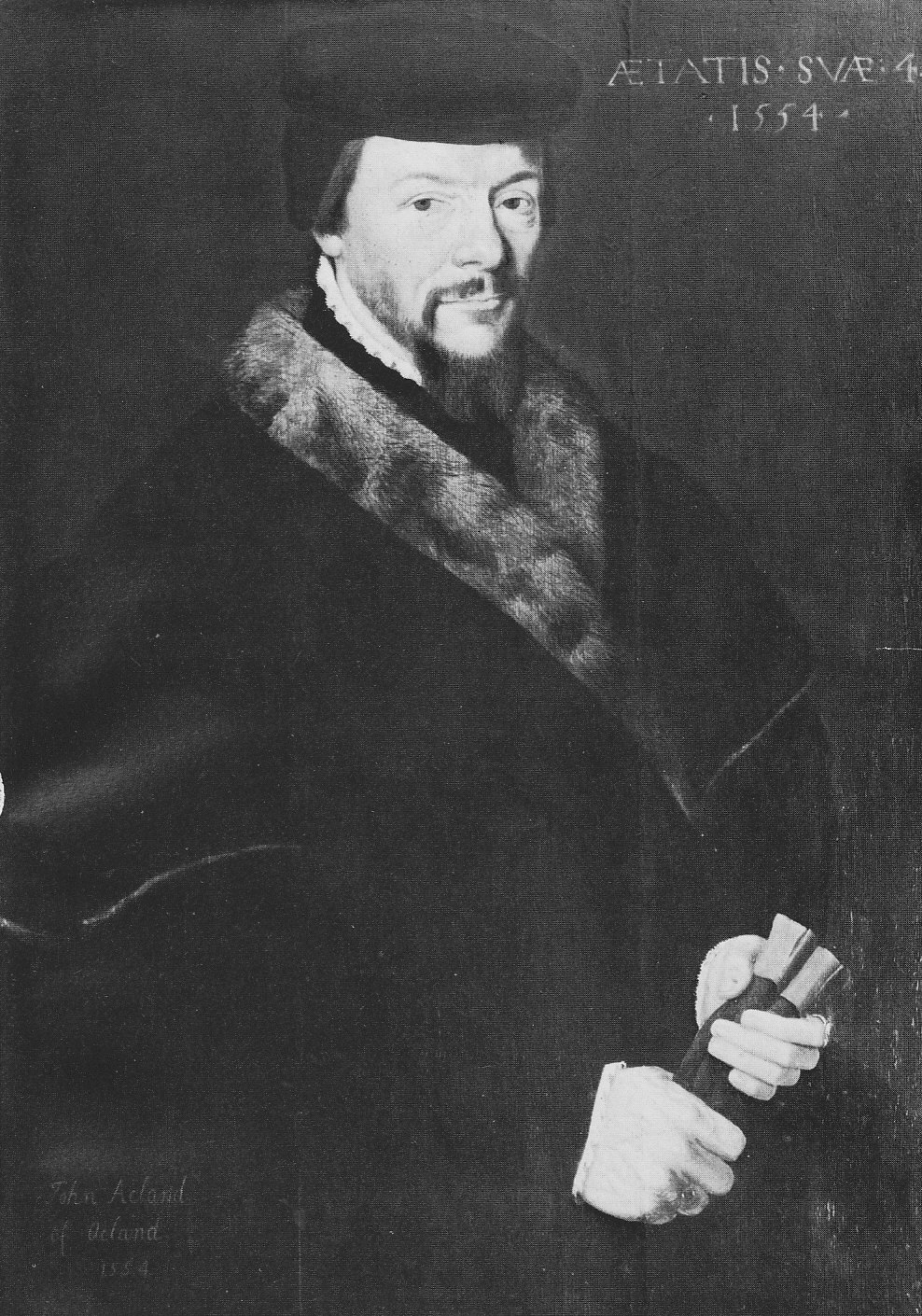
John Acland (died 1553) of Acland. 1554 Portrait by unknown artist. Collection of Killerton House, Devon

- John Akeland (1522–1553) (great-grandson of John Akelane) has been described as "the first of the [Acland] family to emerge from the shadows of history as a visible human being". Little if anything is known of his life and career, he was possibly a minor Tudor official, but he is chiefly remembered for his surviving portrait which is displayed at Killerton House, the earliest surviving image of an Acland and the most cherished in that family's former collection, He married Margaret Radcliff, a daughter and co-heiress of Hugh Radcliff of Stepney, near London. His second son was Sir John Acland (died 14 Feb 1620), knighted at the Tower of London 15 November 1603/4, MP for Devon in 1604, Sheriff of Devon in 1608. He purchased the estate of Columb John in the parish of Broadclyst, Devon. He is one of John Prince's Worthies of Devon.
- Hugh Acland (c. 1543 – 1622) (eldest son & heir) of Acland, eldest son and heir, Sheriff of Devon in 1611. At the age of about 70 he became heir to his wealthy and childless younger brother, Sir John Acland of Columb John, Broadclyst. He was buried in Landkey Church on 22 May 1622. He married Margaret Monke (died 1619), a daughter of Thomas Monke of Potheridge, Merton in Devon, great-grandfather of George Monck, 1st Duke of Albemarle (1608–1670). Thomas Monke's first wife and Margaret's mother was Frances Plantagenet, a daughter of Arthur Plantagenet, 1st Viscount Lisle (died 1542) an illegitimate son of King Edward IV. Lisle had become connected with Devon following his second marriage to Honor Grenville a Devonshire lady whose first husband had been Sir John Bassett, (1462–1529) of Umberleigh, Devon, 4 1/2 miles due south of Acland. He was predeceased by his eldest son and heir, who therefore never inherited Acland:

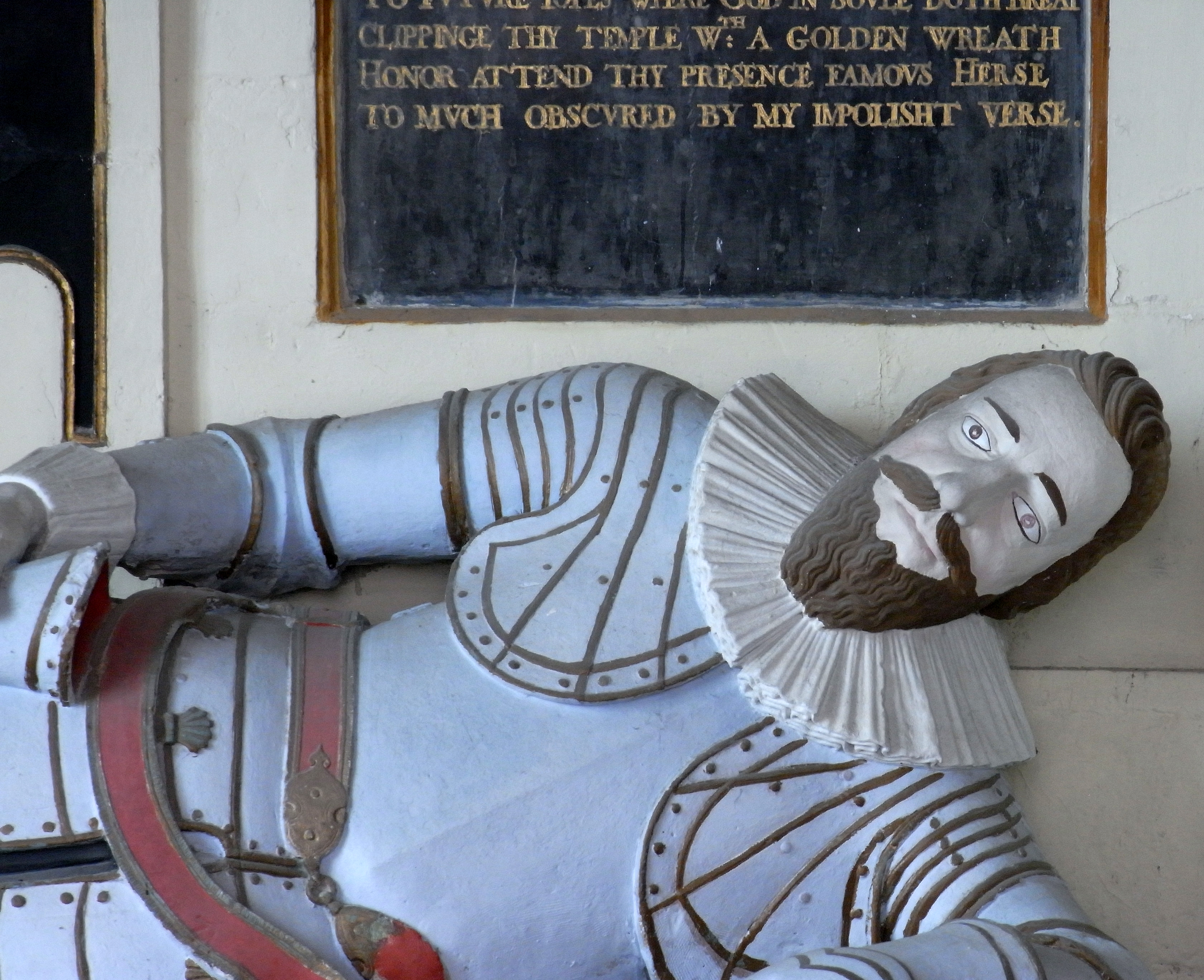
Effigy of Sir Arthur Acland (died 1610) of Acland. Detail from his monument in Landkey Church

  - Arthur Acland (died 1610) (eldest son and heir) whose monument with effigy and inscription survives in the Acland Aisle in Landkey Church. Little is known about his life and career. Arthur Acland married his step-first cousin Eleanor Mallet (1573–1645), a daughter and co-heiress of Robert Mallet of Wooleigh, in the parish of Beaford, near Great Torrington, Devon. Wooleigh adjoins Potheridge, separated by the River Torridge. Eleanor's mother (or step-mother) was Elizabeth Rolle (a daughter of George Rolle (died 1552) of Stevenstone, the founder of a Devonshire land-owning dynasty even greater than the Aclands), who re-married to Sir John Acland (died 1620) of Columb John, Sir Arthur's uncle. Eleanor survived Sir Arthur and remarried to Sir Francis Vincent, 1st Baronet (c. 1568 – 1640) of Stoke d'Abernon, in Surrey.
- Sir John Acland, 1st Baronet (c. 1591 – 1647) (grandson and heir of Hugh Acland (c. 1543 – 1622) and son of Arthur Acland (died 1610), who predeceased his father. He is described in Pole's Description of Devonshire (circa 1635) as "ye nowe lord of Akland". He married his step-sister Elizabeth Vincent (died 1671) and was buried at Stoke D'Abernon. He moved his residence from Acland to Columb John, the former seat of his great-uncle Sir John Acland (died 1620)

After this, Acland was retained in the family's ownership and let to tenants, whereupon it became known as Acland Barton. The house served for many generations as a farmhouse, let to tenants by the Acland family, until it was sold in 1945 to the tenant by Sir Richard Thomas Dyke Acland, 15th Baronet (1906–1990).

For the continuing descent of the Acland family see Acland Baronets and Killerton. By the 19th century the family possessed a huge estate in the West Country of almost 40,000 acres, and in the late 20th century it was probably the oldest surviving landed family in Devon.

== Description in 1726 ==
The "Farme of Akelane" is the first entry in the 261 pages which comprise the 1726 survey made of the Acland estates by Thomas Nott, steward to Sir Hugh Acland, 6th Baronet (1696–1728). It was listed under the heading "Landkey Parish" and was recorded at an annual value of £79, having been leased to Edward Ratclyffe and part to Gregory Davy. The tenant was Samuel Wreford. A note stated:

To this farm there belongs an isle (i.e. aisle) in the parish church of Landkey where many of the ancestors (of) Sr Hugh Acland ly interred, this isle is repaired by the owner of the farme. Notwithstanding it is charged with church rates which being thought unreasonable it was contested at law but given for the parish they proving the ancient usage of the same so that I suppose the isle was built by some of the family for their own conveniency and the rates still continued as before but whatever seat there was before in the church it is now lost.

This appears to confirm that the Acland family built the south transept of St Paul's Church, Landkey, in which is situated the Acland Chapel, in which the only surviving monument is that of Arthur Acland (died 1610) of Acland and in which was formerly situated the Acland family pew. This is not to be confused with the private chapel which existed within the former "mansion" of Acland, licensed by the Bishop of Exeter.

== Map of 1758 ==
The survey made in 1758 by John Bowring of the Acland family's estates includes an elaborate map (no. XVIII) showing "Riverton Manor, Acland Barton, Westcott, East Bathey, West Bathey and a cottage at Newland in the parish of Landkey". It is decorated in the Rococo style with acanthus, field plants, a lamb and winged putto and with scrolls and cornucopia of fruit and flowers.

== Sources ==
- Acland, Anne. A Devon Family: The Story of the Aclands, London and Chichester: Phillimore, 1981
- Hoskins, W. G. A New Survey of England: Devon (New ed.). London: Collins, 1972. ISBN 0-7153-5577-5.
- Pevsner, Nikolaus & Cherry, Bridget, The Buildings of England: Devon, London, 2004, pp. 125–6, Acland Barton
- Pole, Sir William (died 1635), Collections Towards a Description of the County of Devon, Sir John-William de la Pole (ed.), London, 1791, pp. 413–4, Akeland
- Ravenhill, Mary R. & Rowe, Margery M., The Acland Family: Maps and Surveys 1720–1840, Devon & Cornwall Record Society, New Series, Vol.49, Exeter, 2006
- Risdon, Tristram (died 1640), Survey of Devon, 1811 edition, London, 1811, with 1810 Additions, p. 325
- Vivian, Lt.Col. J.L., (Ed.) The Visitations of the County of Devon: Comprising the Heralds' Visitations of 1531, 1564 & 1620, Exeter, 1895
