= Star of Devon =

Apple cultivar

Malus domestica 'Star of Devon'
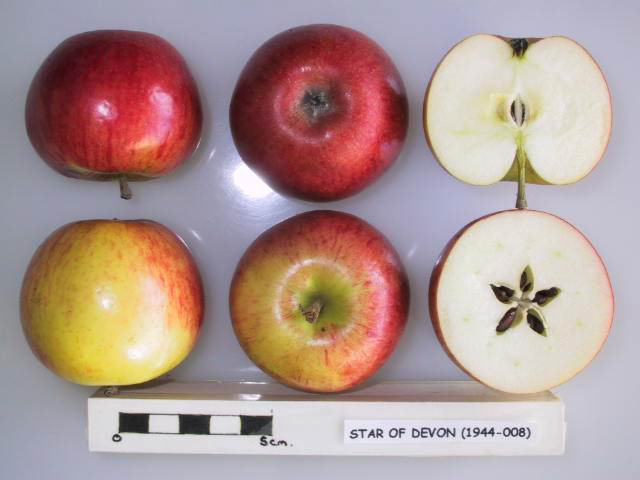
- Origin: Broadclyst Devon before 1905

The 'Star of Devon' apple is a cultivar of medium-sized red dessert apple. It is in season from September to April.

It was raised by J Garland at Broadclyst Devon near Exeter around 1905 and introduced by George Pyne, the owner of Denver Nurseries in Topsham Devon UK. The apple is still grown on the Killerton estate near Broadclyst.
