= Brian Goodlet =

British electrical engineer

Professor Brian Laidlaw Goodlet (13 March 1903 – 27 October 1961) was a British electrical engineer. He was instrumental in the beginnings of nuclear energy in the UK.

== Early life ==
Goodlet was born in Saint Petersburg in the Russian Empire, where he attended the Imperial School. He left Russia in 1918, shortly after the revolution, when he had to fight his way down the Nevsky Prospect in order to board a train to Archangel where he and his parents spent two years in a refugee camp before being able to land in Britain. On arrival, he was offered a job either as a clerk in a bank, or an engineering apprentice in Sheffield. He chose the latter. He moved to Metropolitan Vickers in Manchester where he was put in charge of their high voltage laboratory at the age of 25. At age 27, he studied engineering at Cambridge for two years.

== Career ==
Goodlet worked with Thomas Alibone and John Cockcroft.

In 1937 Goodlet took up the chair of the engineering school at Cape Town University. Whilst there he published his book "Basic Electrotechnics" which became standard reading at many universities.

== Harwell ==
In 1950 Goodlet was head hunted by Sir John Cockcroft to become head of the Engineering Research and Development Division at the Atomic Energy Research Establishment in Oxfordshire.

Goodlet left Harwell on 1 April 1956, and moved to Leicestershire, where he joined Brush Electric Engineering as chief engineering director and subsequently managing director. On his first day the newly supplied Brush steam turbine at the Doncaster power station threw a turbine blade and blew up, causing great losses for the company. Goodlet spent the next two years solving the problem.

== Personal life ==
Goodlet married Norah McCormick in 1932, and they had two sons and two daughters. His wife was the daughter of the vicar of Broadclyst in Devon.

Goodlet died on 27 October 1961 at his home in Quorn, Leicestershire, aged 58, and is buried in the village church.
