= Acland baronets of Fairfield (1818) =

Escutcheon of the Fuller-Palmer-Acland baronets of Fairfield

The Palmer-Acland, later Fuller-Palmer-Acland Baronetcy, of Fairfield in the County of Somerset, was created in the Baronetage of the United Kingdom on 9 December 1818 for John Palmer-Acland. He was the son of a younger son of the 6th Baronet of the 1644/1678 creation.

The 2nd Baronet assumed the additional surname of Fuller. The title became extinct on his death in 1871.

== Acland baronets, of Fairfield (1818) ==
- Sir John Palmer-Acland, 1st Baronet (1756–1831)
- Sir Peregrine Palmer Fuller-Palmer-Acland, 2nd Baronet (1789–1871)

== Notes ==
Baronetage of the United Kingdom
Preceded by Hervey-Bathurst baronets	Acland baronets of Fairfield; 9 December 1818	Succeeded by Lechmere baronets
