= Arthur Acland (died 1610) =

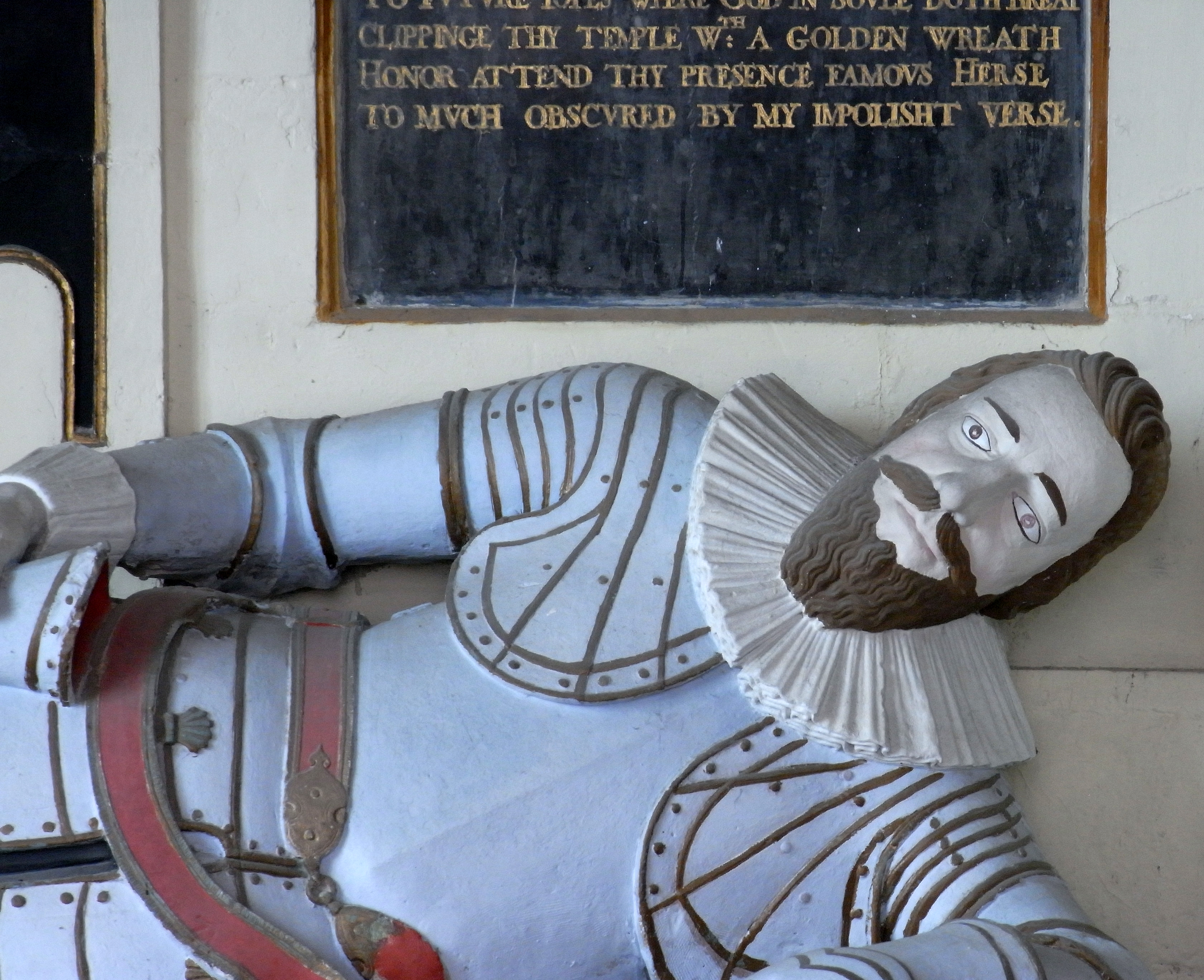
Detail of Acland's effigy on his monument in Landkey Church

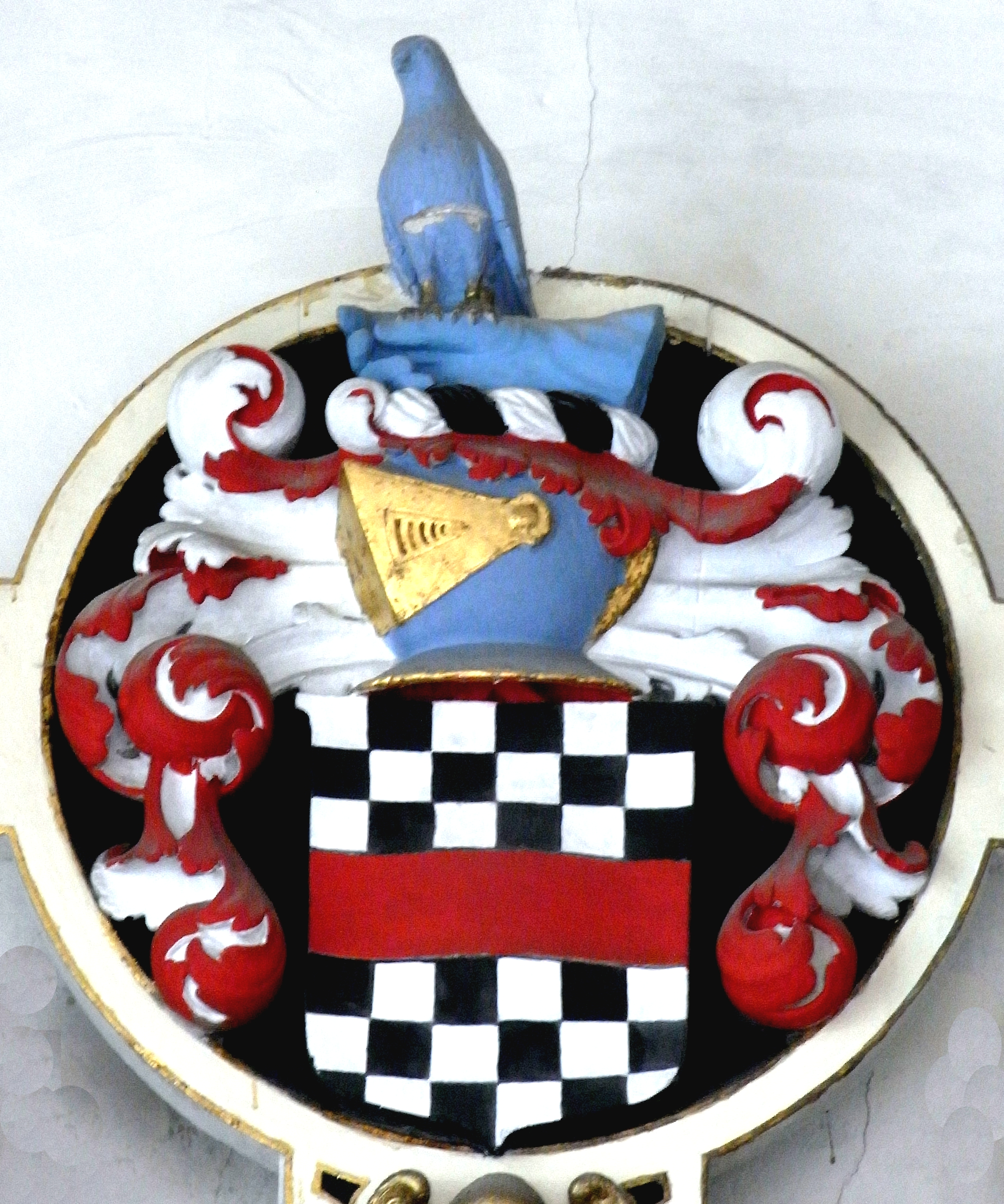
Detail of Acland's Heraldic achievement on his monument in Landkey Church. (Note: Blazoned thus: Chequy argent and sable a fess gules. Crest: A man's hand apaumée couped at the wrist in a glove lying fesswise to the sinister thereon a falcon perched all proper jessed and belled or)

Sir Arthur Acland (also recorded as Sir Arthure Akelane) (1573–1610) of Acland in the parish of Landkey, Devon, was a member of the Devonshire gentry, and was knighted in 1606. Little is known of his life and career, but his monumental inscription survives above his monument in Landkey Church. His son was Sir John Acland, 1st Baronet (c. 1591 – 1647). He was ancestor to the prominent, wealthy and long-enduring Acland family of Killerton, which survives today in the direct male line.

== Origins ==
Arthur Acland's grandfather was John Acland (died 1553), of Acland, described as "the first of the [Acland] family to emerge from the shadows of history as a visible human being". His father was Hugh Acland (c. 1543 – 1622) of Acland, Sheriff of Devon in 1611, and he was the eldest of his four sons. His mother was Margaret Monke (died 1619), who was a daughter of Thomas Monke (c. 1515 – c. 1583), of Potheridge, who came from an ancient Devonshire family and was great-grandfather of George Monck, 1st Duke of Albemarle (1608–1670). Thomas Monke's first wife and Margaret's mother was Frances Plantagenet, a daughter of Arthur Plantagenet, 1st Viscount Lisle (died 1542) an illegitimate son of King Edward IV.

== Marriage and children ==
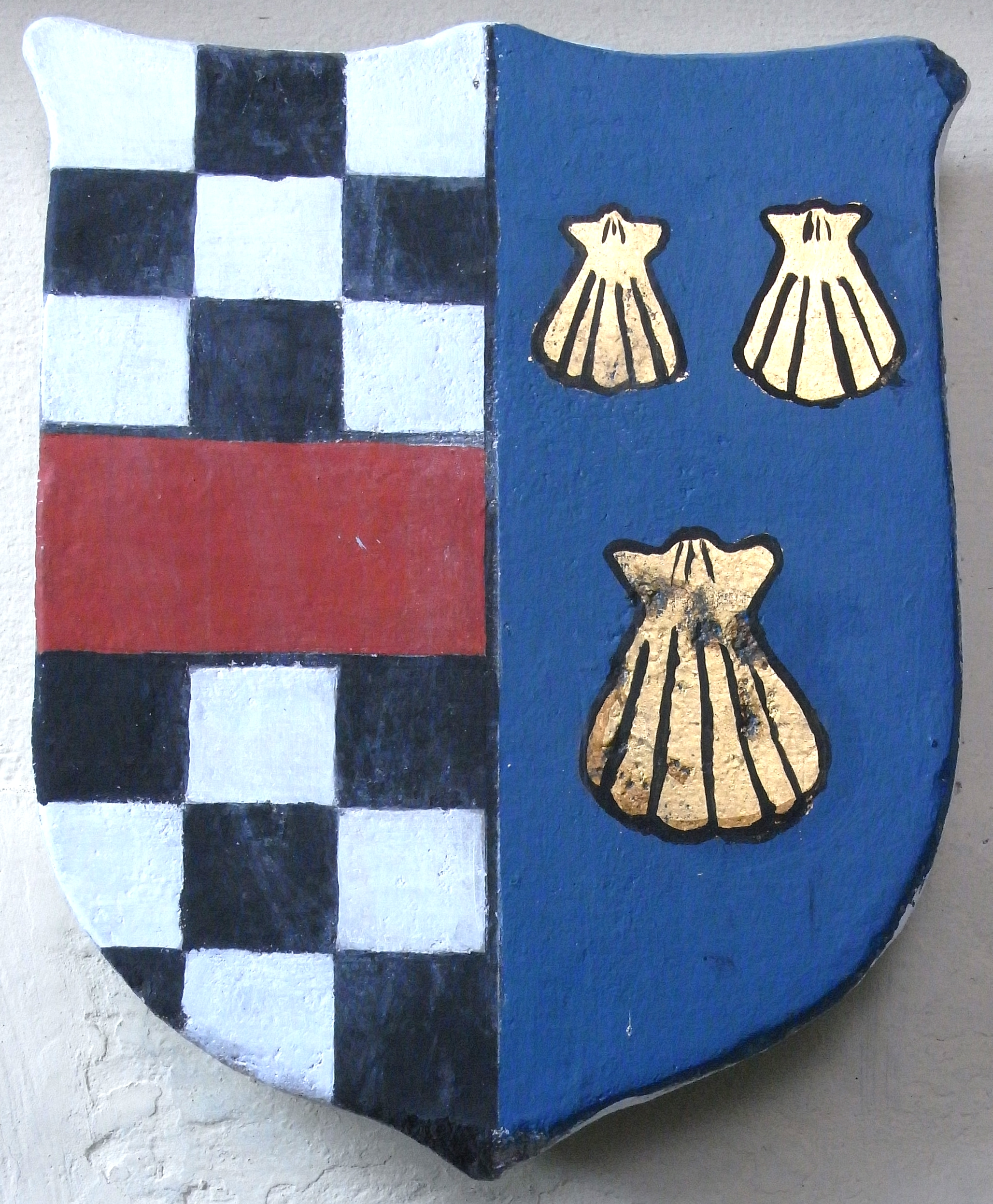
Escutcheon showing arms of Acland impaling Mallet: Azure, three escallops or. Detail from Acland's monument

Acland married his step-first cousin Eleanor Mallet (1573–1645), a daughter and co-heiress of Robert Mallet of Woolleigh, Beaford. Her mother (or step-mother) was Elizabeth Rolle, who remarried to Sir John Acland (died 1620), Sir Arthur's uncle. Eleanor survived her husband and remarried to Sir Francis Vincent, 1st Baronet (c. 1568–1640) of Stoke d'Abernon, in Surrey.

By Eleanor, Acland had a son and heir, Sir John Acland, 1st Baronet (c. 1591 – 1647) who married his step-sister Elizabeth Vincent (died 1671) and was buried at Stoke D'Abernon. They also had two daughters: Elizabeth, who married her step-relative Anthony Vincent of Stoke D'Abernon; and Anna who died childless.

== Death and succession ==
Acland died aged 37 on 26 December 1610, and was buried 10 January 1611 in Landkey Church, where there is a large monument with effigies of himself and his wife. He left a widow and not only pre-deceased his wealthy and childless uncle Sir John Acland (died 1620), but also pre-deceased his own father, who died 12 years later in 1622.

He thus never inherited the Acland paternal estates which passed in 1622 to his son Sir John Acland, 1st Baronet (c. 1591 – 1647), even though his three younger brothers were still living. The first baronet thus inherited his father's new estate of Killerton, his grandfather's ancient estate of Acland with several others (Note: His grandfather John Acland (died 1553) was known to have held property in 27 parishes.) and also his great-uncle's new estate of Columb John, where he made his home, leaving Acland to become a residence for younger branches of the family.

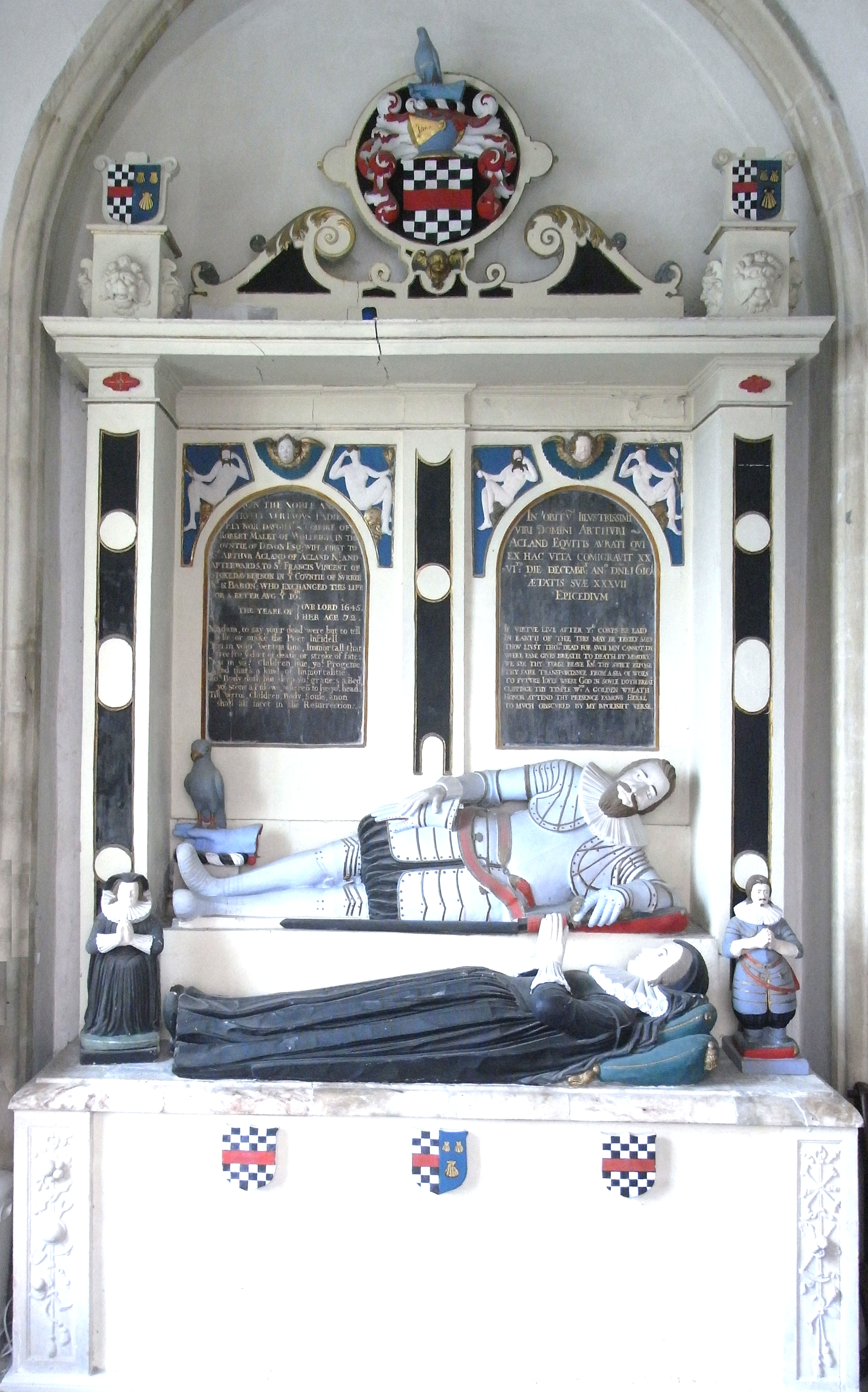
Monument to Sir Arthur Acland and his wife Eleanor in Landkey Church

== Monument ==
Acland's monument, said to have been erected by his grieving father, survives in Landkey Church. It shows Sir Arthur lying prostrate, in full armour, propped up on his left elbow. In front and below him lies his wife Eleanor Mallet. Above are two round headed black tablets inscribed with gilt lettering.

== Sources ==
- Acland, Anne. A Devon Family: The Story of the Aclands. London and Chichester: Phillimore, 1981
- Vivian, Lt.Col. J.L., (Ed.) The Visitations of the County of Devon: Comprising the Heralds' Visitations of 1531, 1564 & 1620, Exeter, 1895
