= Denys Rolle (died 1638) =

British sheriff

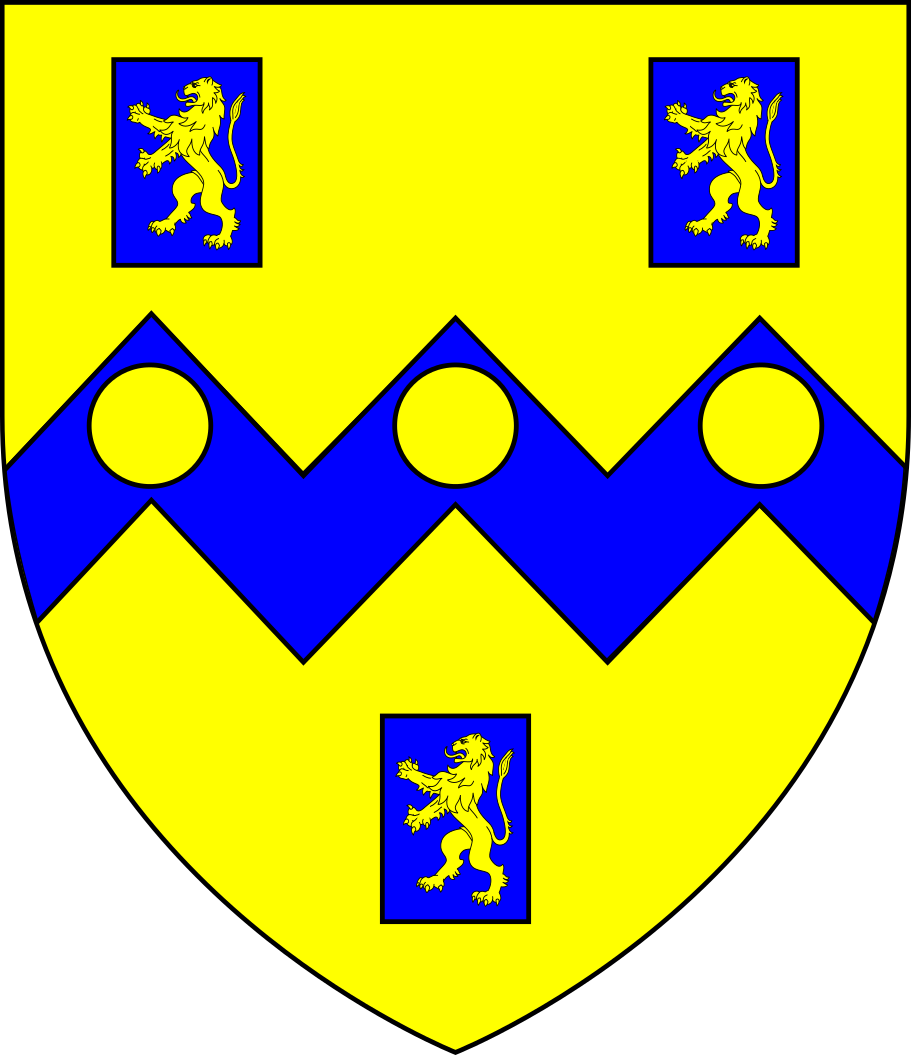
- Arms of Rolle: Or, on a fesse dancetté between three billets azure each charged with a lion rampant of the first three bezants

Sheriff of Devon
- In office 1636

Personal details
- Born: 1614
- Died: 1638 (aged 24)
- Spouse: Margaret Poulett
- Children: 6

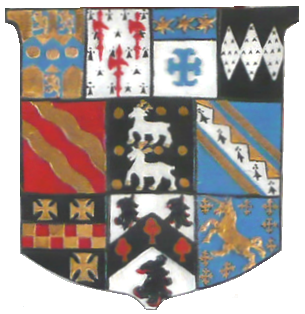
Heraldic escutcheon of Denys Rolle (1614–1638), Rolle Mausoleum, Bicton, showing the following ten quarterings of the Rolle and Denys families 1st:Rolle; 2nd:Denys; 3rd:Dabernon; 4th:Giffard of Halsbury in the parish of Parkham; 5th:Stapledon; 6th:Bockerell; 7th:Cristenstowe; 8th:Gobodesley; 9th:Chiderleigh; 10th:Done (or Dunn)

Denys Rolle (1614–1638) of Bicton and Stevenstone in Devon was Sheriff of Devon in 1636. He was one of the biographer John Prince's Worthies of Devon.

== Origins ==
Denys Rolle was the second but only surviving son of Sir Henry Rolle (died 1617) of Stevenstone by his wife Anne Denys, a daughter and co-heiress of Thomas Denys of Bicton and Holcombe Burnell by his wife Anne Paulet, daughter of William Paulet, 3rd Marquess of Winchester (1532–1598). His father pre-deceased his own father Sir Henry Rolle (1545–1625) of Stevenstone and thus Denys Rolle was heir to his grandfather. He was also heir to the large Denys estates of his mother, including Bicton.

== Career ==
Rolle was according to most chroniclers a prodigy who died young at the age of 24 before his great potential was fulfilled. The Devon historian Tristram Risdon (died 1640) wrote of him:

The hopeful Dennis Roll, esq., who though he were the youngest that ever had the government of this county committed unto him, to be commanded by a white staff yet managed he that place with such staidness as elder ages could not have performed better service to their sovereign nor done their country better credit, shewing himself so free hearted that he exceeded in liberality; but this bud soon blasted in the blossom.

John Prince (1643–1723) called him

The darling of his country in his time, adorn'd with all the desirable qualities that make a compleat gentleman.

Prince then relates an event in his life which illustrated his honourable disposition. Rolle loaned a large sum of money to Sir Bevil Grenville (1596–1643) in return for his written bond. Later when the two men were together in company, Rolle sent for the bond and threw it in the fire, stating that he had no need of a written bond and that

the bare word of so honourable a person was to him sufficient security for that and a greater sum... He was, most of all what endears greatness, of great courtesy and condescention, even to his inferiors. And the poor always found a most liberal and open-handed benefactor in him, and so did all that had occasion to make tryal of his charity and generosity.

== Marriage and issue ==
Arms of Paulet/Poulett: Sable, three swords pilewise points in base proper pomels and hilts or. These arms impaled by Rolle are visible on the monument to Denys Rolle in the Rolle Mausoleum, Bicton

Rolle married Margaret Poulett, daughter of John Poulett, 1st Baron Poulett (1585–1649) of Hinton St George in Somerset (a distant cousin of Paulet, Marquess of Winchester) by his wife Elizabeth Kenn (died 1663). On 1 September 1637 an agreement of mutual maintenance was signed by Rolle and his father-in-law and Elizabeth, Countess of Essex (died 1656), (Elizabeth Poulet, daughter of Sir William Poulet of Edington, Wiltshire, past High Sheriff of Wiltshire and cousin of William Paulet, 4th Marquess of Winchester), second wife of Robert Devereux, 3rd Earl of Essex (1591–1646), whom she had married in 1630 and separated from in 1631. She remained at Essex House in The Strand, London, whilst Robert "played soldiers" on his estates.) and Thomas Smyth, husband of Florence Poulett, sister-in-law of Rolle and mother of Sir Hugh Smith, 1st Baronet, which committed all parties to share a household for a period of seven years, stating the sums of money to be committed by each party. Each year's residence was to be divided between Hinton St George (Poulett seat), Bicton (Rolle seat) and Ashton (Long Ashton, Somerset, seat of Thomas Smyth).

He had by his wife the following issue:

- Dennis Rolle, died an infant
- Florence Rolle, eldest daughter, baptised at St Giles in the Wood, the parish church of Stevenstone, on 27 February 1631. She married her cousin Sir John Rolle (1626–1706), of Marrais, who eventually inherited under tail-male the vast Rolle estates including Stevenstone and Bicton.
- Margaret Rolle, 2nd daughter, married firstly Sir John Acland, 3rd Baronet (died 1655) of Columb John; secondly Henry Ayshford (1639–1662) of Ayshford in the parish of Burlescombe.
- Anne Rolle, 3rd daughter, married William Cooke of Highnam in Gloucestershire
- Elizabeth Rolle, 4th daughter, married William Strode, son of Sir George Stroud of Sussex, possibly descended from the ancient Devon family of Strode of Newnham, Plympton St Mary.
- Frances Rolle (1635–1642), 5th daughter, died an infant aged 7

== Death and succession ==
Rolle was buried at Bicton on 13 June 1638. His elaborate tomb monument with heraldic achievement is contained within the Rolle Mausoleum, the remnant of the former Parish Church of Bicton to the immediate east of which stands the new church of St Mary built in 1850. The Mausoleum is the private property of Lord Clinton and is not open to the public. The inscription on his monument was quoted by Swete and included a wish from his widow that their son should not die young.

His widow's wish as stated on the epitaph was not met and the couple's son Dennis died soon after his father, leaving only daughters who were excluded from the inheritance by entail. The manor of Bicton, together with all the other Rolle estates including Stevenstone then passed to Henry Rolle (1605–1647) of Beam, near Great Torrington, the elder son of John Rolle (1563–post 1628), MP, the uncle of Sir Henry Rolle (died 1617). He himself died without children and the Rolle estates, now increased by the addition of Beam, devolved following his death in 1647 upon his closest male cousin, 21-year-old Sir John Rolle (1626–1706), MP, of Marrais in the parish of St Mary Week, Cornwall. He was immediately thereupon married to his young cousin Florence Rolle of Bicton, one of the surviving daughters of Denys Rolle (died 1638). Thus his claim to the Inheritance of Rolle of Stevenstone and Bicton was strengthened and consolidated.

== Sources ==
- Prince, John, (1643–1723) The Worthies of Devon, 1810 edition, pp. 706–9, biography of Dennis Rolle
- Vivian, Lt.Col. J.L., (Ed.) The Visitations of the County of Devon: Comprising the Heralds' Visitations of 1531, 1564 & 1620, Exeter, 1895, pp. 652–656, pedigree of Rolle, p. 653
