= Commission of array =

General proclamation to defend the state in the Kingdom of England

A commission of array was a commission given by English sovereigns to officers or gentry in a given territory to muster and array the inhabitants and to see them in a condition for war, or to put soldiers of a country in a condition for military service. The term arrayers is used in some ancient English statutes, for an officer who had a commission of array.

== History ==
Commissions of array developed from the ancient obligation of all free men to defend their tribal lands. Commissioners were usually experienced soldiers, appointed by the crown to array able bodied men from each shire. By the time of the Wars of the Roses, conscript levies were less important than troops raised by indenture.

=== Medieval examples ===
- A Commission of Array was established in October 1403 by King Henry IV by letters patent to raise an army to resist the Welsh rebellion of Owain Glyndŵr, who had recently captured Newport Castle.
- In October 1473 there was a commission to oust the rebels who had entered St Michael's Mount in Cornwall.

=== Civil War revival ===
Although long obsolete by the 17th century, the system was revived by King Charles I in 1642 at the start of the Civil War, in an unconstitutional manner, that is to say without Parliament having been consulted, in order to counteract the equally unconstitutional and in addition unlawful Militia Ordinance enacted by Parliament in 1642 without the usual royal assent. Both decrees tried to gain control of existing militia and to raise further troops. The Commission of Array issued by the king thus sought to muster a Royalist army. Commissioners were appointed for each county, generally from leading members of the local aristocracy and gentry who might be assumed to wield great influence over their feudal tenants and the population in general. The commissioners read out the text of their commission in public gatherings in the main towns. Often the local people suspected such innovative royal decrees, uncertain in precedent and purpose, to be designed for the general suppression of the people, and they were openly hostile. Opponents of the king, whilst playing down the role of the Militia Ordinance in augmenting civil strife, portrayed the Commission of Array as a sign that it was the king and not Parliament who was the real aggressor in the developing conflict.

==== Devon ====
Twenty-eight Commissioners of Array were appointed in Devon on 19 July 1642, including:

- Henry Bourchier, 5th Earl of Bath
- Edward Chichester, 1st Viscount Chichester
- George Southcote of Buckland-Tout-Saints, appointed but apparently never acted as he was appointed Sheriff of Devon during the Commonwealth. Father of Thomas Southcote (c. 1622 – 1664), also of Buckland-Tout-Saints, MP.
- Sir John Acland, 1st Baronet (c. 1591 – 1647)

== See also ==
- Posse comitatus

== Bibliography ==
- 1828 Webster's Dictionary
