= Sir John Acland, 1st Baronet =

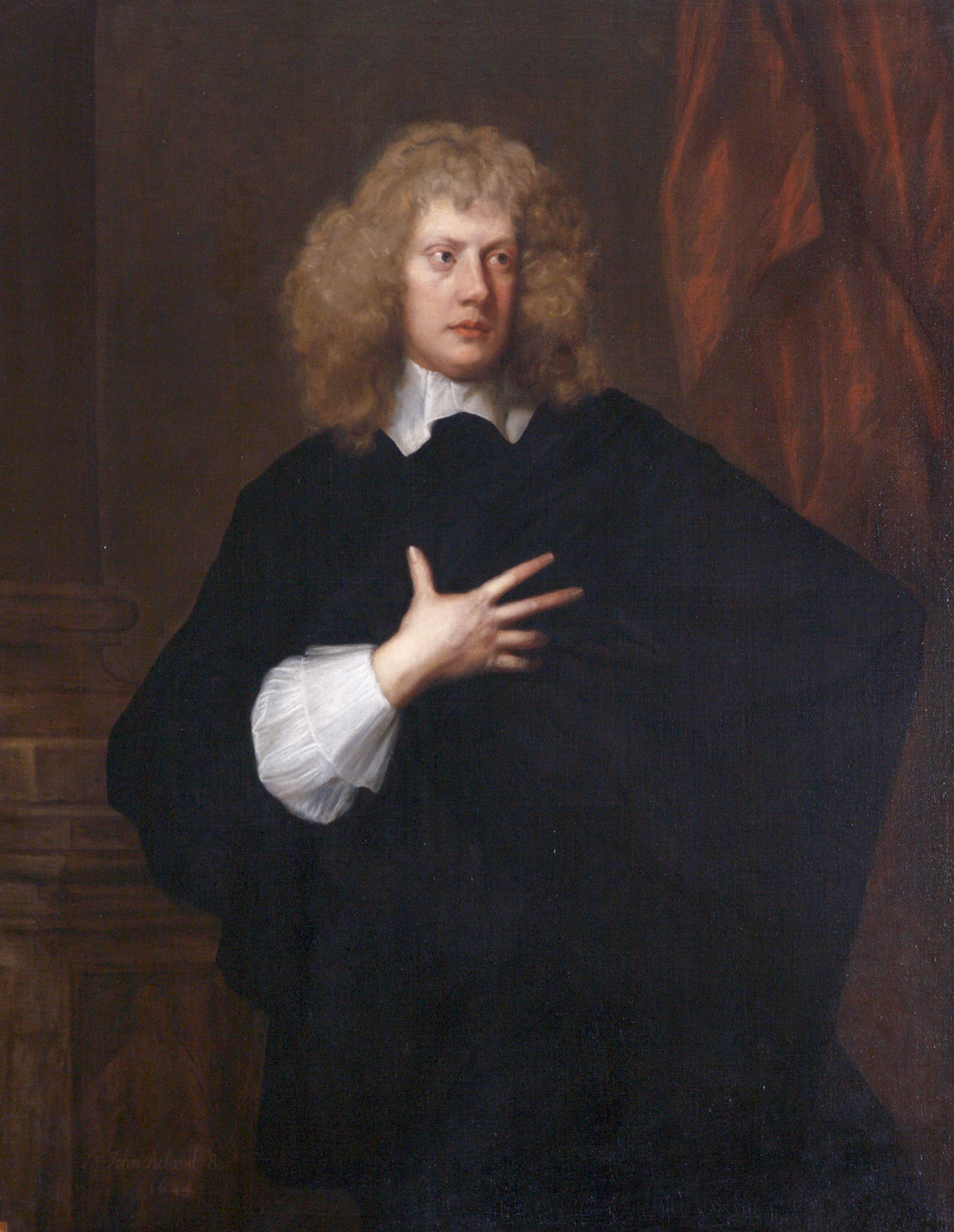
Sir John Acland, 1st Baronet. Portrait c.1644 by Robert Walker (1599–1658), collection of National Trust, Killerton House

Arms of Acland: Chequy argent and sable, a fesse gules

Sir John Acland, 1st Baronet (c. 1591 – 24 August 1647) of Acland in the parish of Landkey and of Columb John in Devon, England, was a Royalist commander in the Civil War, during the early part of which he maintained a garrison for the king on his estate of Columb John. He was created a baronet in 1644 for his support, but the letters patent were lost or never finalised and the dignity was not confirmed until 1677/8, long after his death. He compounded with Parliament for his estate in 1646 and died the following year.

== Origins ==
Acland was the son of Sir Arthur Acland (died 1610) of Acland by his wife Eleanor Mallet, daughter and heiress of Robert Mallet of Wooleigh in the parish of Beaford, Devon. He succeeded his grandfather Hugh Acland (c. 1543 – 1622) of Acland, whom his father had predeceased.

== Career ==
He moved his residence from Acland to Columb John, the former seat of his great-uncle Sir John Acland (died 1620). In 1633 he was Colonel of a regiment of the Devon Trained Bands. He was Sheriff of Devon in 1641. On 19 July 1642, before the start of the Civil War, he was appointed by King Charles I as one of 28 Commissioners of Array for Devon. He raised two regiments for the King and by the summer of 1643 the garrison at his estate of Columb John was the only one remaining in Devon for the King, until the capture of Exeter. He was rewarded with a baronetcy, "of Columb John in the County of Devon", granted on 24 June 1644; but the letters patent were destroyed in the War, or never passed the Great Seal to be enrolled, so that the grant was not confirmed until 1677/8. The title was allowed to drop by his successors until the accession of his fourth son Sir Hugh Acland, 5th Baronet. After the reversal of Royalist fortunes in the Westcountry, Acland was at length compelled to cease resistance. General Fairfax made Columb John his headquarters while besieging Exeter in 1645/6, which city surrendered on terms on 9 April 1646. Acland was included in the surrender, and Fairfax recommended that the House of Commons offer him a moderate composition for his estate. His fine was set in July 1646 at £1,727, half of which he paid in August and obtained a suspension of the sequestration. However, he suffered from the attentions of Richard Evans, a brewer of Exeter, who obtained a re-sequestration of the estate for damages due to him. Acland fell ill and died on 24 August 1647; his original fine was accepted in June 1648 and the sequestration was overturned.

== Marriage and children ==
In about 1625 he married his step-sister Elizabeth Vincent, daughter of Sir Francis Vincent, 1st Baronet (1568–1640) of Stoke d'Abernon in Surrey, by his first wife Sarah Paulet. Acland's mother Eleanor Mallet became Vincent's third wife, having survived her first husband Sir Arthur Acland (died 1610). By his wife he had children including: (Note: Sources are inconsistent in enumerating Acland's children. Vivian's Visitation, based in part on the wills of the family, includes five sons and one daughter, Susan. Other sources on the baronetage include two daughters: Susanna, twice married, and Eleanor, said to have been the first wife of Sir John Davie, 2nd Baronet, whose name Vivian could not discover. Vivian says that Sir Francis is mentioned in his grandmother's will (only); a petition to Parliament in April 1648 was made by John, calling himself son and heir, with three younger brothers and a sister living. The burial of Sir Francis at Stoke d'Abernon is not in the parish registers.)

- Arthur Acland (bap. 1625 – 1631), died young.
- Francis Acland (1626/7), died an infant
- Sir Francis Acland, 2nd Baronet (died 1649), eldest surviving son and heir, who survived his father only briefly.
- Sir John Acland, 3rd Baronet (c. 1634 – 1655), heir to his elder brother.
- Robert Acland (died 1655/6), matriculated at Exeter College, Oxford on 27 November 1652.
- Sir Hugh Acland, 5th Baronet (c. 1639 – 1714)
- Charles Acland (d. bef. 1651), died without children.
- Susan or Susanna Acland (c.1634 – 5 February 1696/7), married firstly Edward Halsall, equerry to Queen Catherine, and secondly John Carleton (died 1709) (Note: Her monumental inscription, erected in 1709, describes her as the daughter of Sir Hugh, the 5th Baronet, but this is inconsistent with her age as stated in the same inscription.)
- Eleanor Acland (bap. 1622 – bef. 1647), who married Sir John Davie, 2nd Baronet
- Elizabeth Acland (bap. 1624 – bef. 1647)

== Death and burial ==
Acland died on 24 August 1647 and was buried in Stoke D'Abernon Church in Surrey. At the north-west of the chancel floor survives his ledger stone inscribed: "Sir John Ackland, of Ackland, in the county of Devon, Barronett".

== Ancestry ==
Ancestors of Sir John Acland, 1st Baronet

16. John Akeland
8. John Akeland
17. Margaret Cruse
4. Hugh Acland
18. Hugh Radcliffe
9. Margaret Radcliffe
2. Sir Arthur Acland
10. Thomas Monke/Monck
5. Margaret Monke/Monck
22. Arthur Plantagenet, 1st Viscount Lisle
11. Frances Plantagenet
23. Elizabeth Grey
1. John Acland, 1st Baronet of Columb John
12. John Mallet
6. Robert Mallet
3. Eleanor Mallet
14. George Rolle
7. Elizabeth Rolle

== Notes ==
Honorary titles
Preceded by Sir Nicholas Martyn	High Sheriff of Devon; 1641	Succeeded by Edmund Fortescue
Baronetage of England
New creation	Baronet (of Columb John); 1644–1647	Succeeded by Francis Acland
