= Sir Hugh Acland, 5th Baronet =

English politician

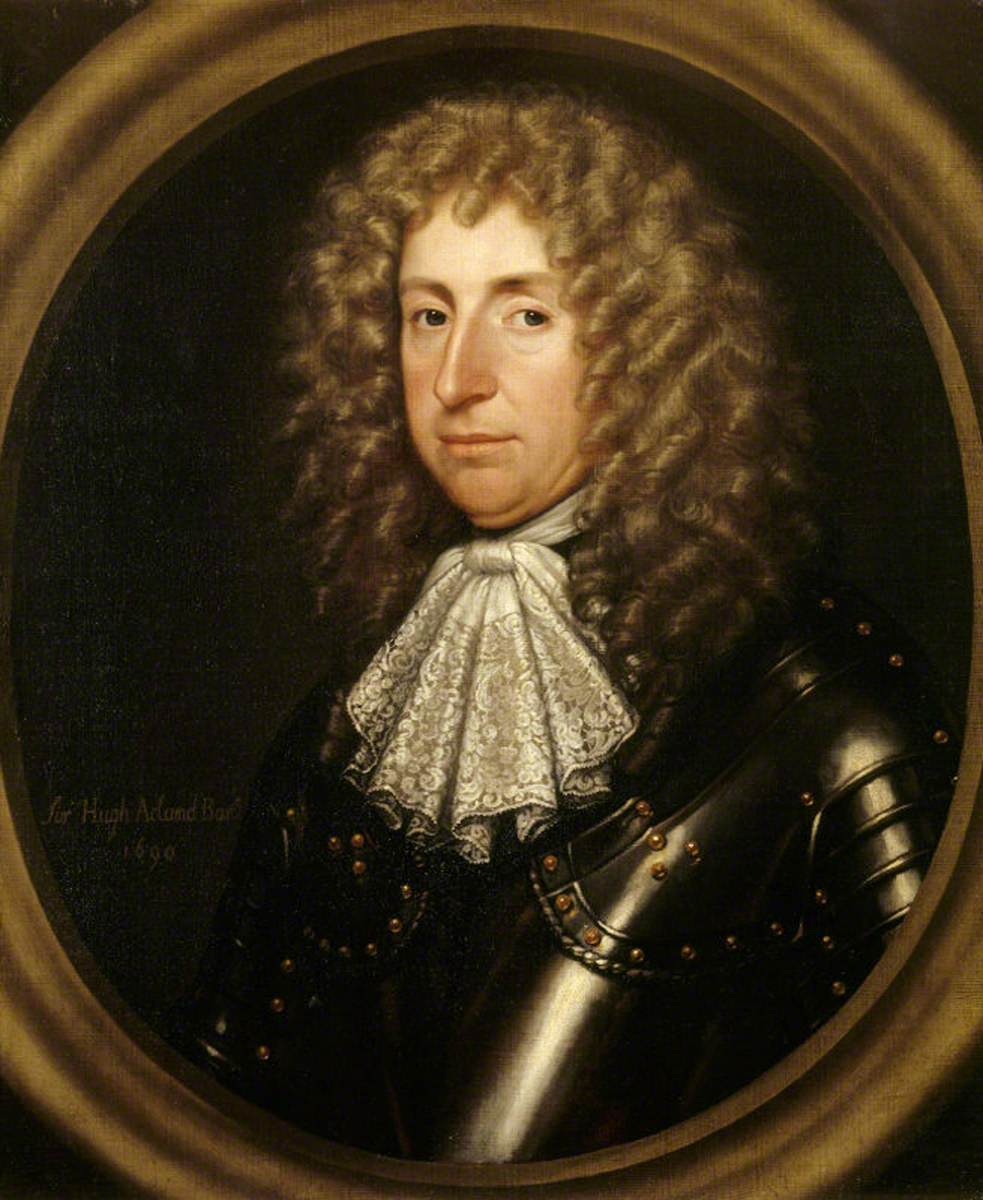
Portrait of Acland

Sir Hugh Acland, 5th Baronet (c. 1639 – 9 March 1714) was an English politician. He obtained a confirmation of the family baronetcy in 1678, and served as a Member of Parliament for two boroughs in Devon in 1679 and from 1685 to 1687. Never very active in national politics, he was one of the many Tories estranged by James II's pro-Catholicism, but remained a Tory after the Glorious Revolution. He continued to hold local office in Devon off and on until his death in 1714, when he was succeeded by his grandson.

== Career ==
He was a younger son of Sir John Acland, 1st Baronet and his wife Elizabeth. He matriculated at Exeter College, Oxford on 27 November 1652 and received his B.A. on 22 June 1655.

He was appointed a justice of the peace for Devon in 1670, and in 1672, he succeeded his nephew Arthur as baronet and inherited an estate worth £2,000 per year. In 1673, he was appointed a commissioner for assessment in Devon, and unsuccessfully contested a by-election at Tiverton following the death of Sir Thomas Carew, 1st Baronet. He was appointed to the commission on recusants in 1675 and made a freeman of Exeter; in 1676, he was appointed a deputy lieutenant of the county.

The family baronetcy was of somewhat uncertain status; the letters patent to his father were either lost during the confusion of the English Civil War or never passed the seals. Sir Hugh's predecessors in the baronetcy had generally died in their minorities and had not pursued the claim. Hugh obtained new letters patent dated 21 January 1678 which confirmed the original grant and granted precedence to the baronetcy of the original date of issue, 24 June 1644.

Acland again stood for Parliament for Barnstaple in the spring 1679 election and was successfully returned. He was not an active member and, though thought to be a Court supporter, was absent from the division on the exclusion bill. He did not stand again in the fall 1679 election. In 1680, he left the Devon committee for assessment; he was already a colonel of militia foot by this time.

He stood for Devon in the 1681 election but was defeated. Appointed a justice of the peace and an alderman for Tiverton in 1683, he was returned to Parliament for that constituency as a Tory in 1685, and elected mayor of the town the following year. He was also appointed a JP for South Molton in 1684. After the collapse of the Monmouth Rebellion, he was appointed a commissioner for rebels' estates. Once again, he was largely inactive in Parliament, serving on the committee to prevent the export of wool. In 1687, the Tiverton corporation was remodelled by quo warranto proceedings and he was removed from his offices there. In July 1688 he joined with many of the Devonshire gentry in repeating the temporizing answer given by Sir Edward Seymour to the "Three Questions" of James II, and was consequently dismissed from his county offices.

Acland was reappointed a JP for Devon in October 1688 and served on the commission for assessment again from 1689 to 1690. He was High Sheriff of Devon in 1690. He refused to sign the Association in 1696 and was removed from the bench at this time. Reappointed in 1700, he apparently refused a deputy lieutenancy in 1701 due to a quarrel with Sir Edward Seymour. Off the bench again in 1702, he was appointed to the deputy lieutenancy again in 1703 and a JP for the third time in about 1704. He continued to serve in these posts throughout the reign of Queen Anne, and died on 9 March 1714.

== Family ==
He married Anne, daughter of Sir Thomas Daniel of Beswick Hall, Yorkshire, on 19 March 1674 and had seven children: (Note: The memorial inscription for Susanna Carleton, née Acland, (d. 5 February 1696/7) in St. Pancras Church describes her as his daughter, and Vivian concurs; but the age given for her in the inscription makes this impossible, and she appears to have been his sister. Burke's Peerage confuses Arthur Daniel with his nephew Arthur (d. 1740), the son of John Acland.)

- John Acland (c. 1674 – 1703)
- Hugh Acland
- Rev. Thomas Acland (d. 11 September 1735), rector of South Brent and prebendary of Exeter, married Catherine Wilcocks on 12 February 1712 and had issue
- Arthur Daniel Acland (d. 1690–1), died without issue
- Charles Acland (d. 1713)
- Francis Acland (d. 1719), a merchant in Coimbra, died without issue
- Elizabeth Acland (d. 1694)

On his death in 1714 he was succeeded in the baronetcy by his grandson, his eldest son John having predeceased him. He was buried on 9 March 1713 or 1714 at Broadclyst.

== Notes ==
Parliament of England
Preceded by Nicholas Dennys; John Basset	Member of Parliament for Barnstaple; February–October 1679; With: John Basset	Succeeded by Arthur Acland; John Basset
Preceded by Samuel Foote; Sir Henry Ford	Member of Parliament for Tiverton; 1685–1687; With: William Colman	Succeeded by Samuel Foote; William Colman
Honorary titles
Preceded by Francis Fulford	High Sheriff of Devon; 1690	Succeeded by Sampson Hele
Baronetage of England
Preceded by Arthur Acland	Baronet (of Columb John); 1672–1714	Succeeded by Hugh Acland
