= Acland baronets =

Arms of Acland: Chequy argent and sable, a fesse gules

There have been four baronetcies created for members of the Acland family, two in the Baronetage of England and two in the Baronetage of the United Kingdom. The family originated in the 12th century at the estate of Acland in the parish of Landkey, North Devon.

- Acland baronets of Columb John (1644), later renewed, in 1678, by letters patent
- Acland baronets of Fairfield (1818), for Palmer-Acland and Fuller-Palmer-Acland
- Acland baronets of St Mary Magdalen (1890)
