= Landkey =

Village in the United Kingdom

Coordinates: 51°03′49″N 4°00′18″W

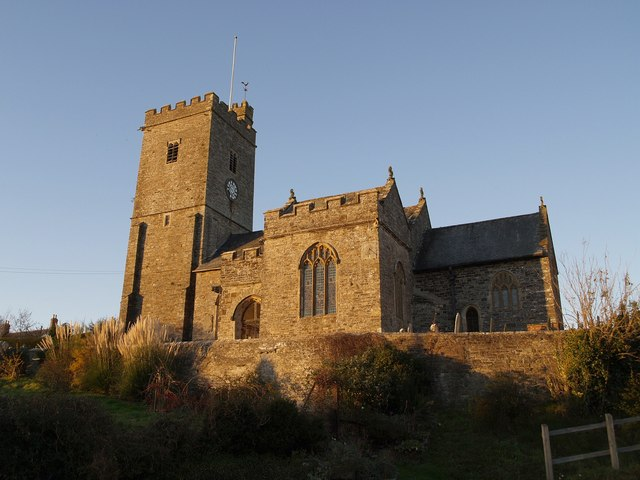
- St Paul's Church

- Location within Devon
- Population: 2,302 (2021 census)
- OS grid reference: SX015589
- Civil parish: Landkey
- District: North Devon
- Shire county: Devon
- Region: South West
- Country: England
- Sovereign state: United Kingdom
- Post town: BARNSTAPLE
- Postcode district: EX32
- Police: Devon and Cornwall
- Fire: Devon and Somerset
- Ambulance: South Western
- UK Parliament: North Devon

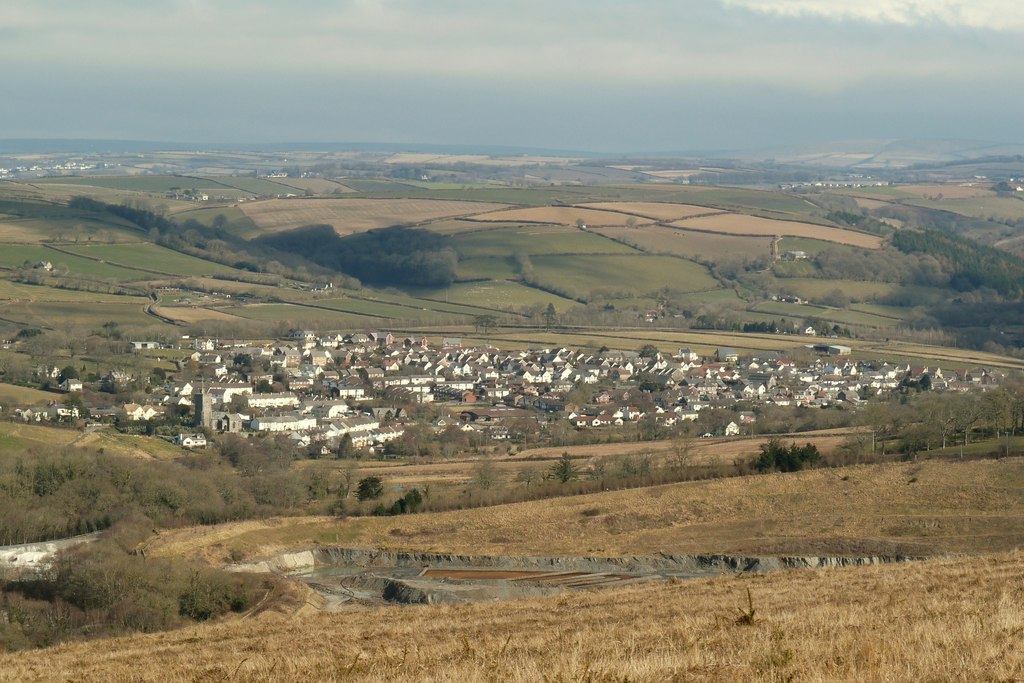
Landkey viewed from Codden Hill

Landkey // is a village and civil parish in the North Devon district, in the county of Devon, England. The parish has a population of 2,302 according to the 2021 census. It is situated 3 miles (4.8 km) from the nearest town of Barnstaple. The village is a major part of the electoral ward called Landkey, Swimbridge and Taw.

== Origin ==
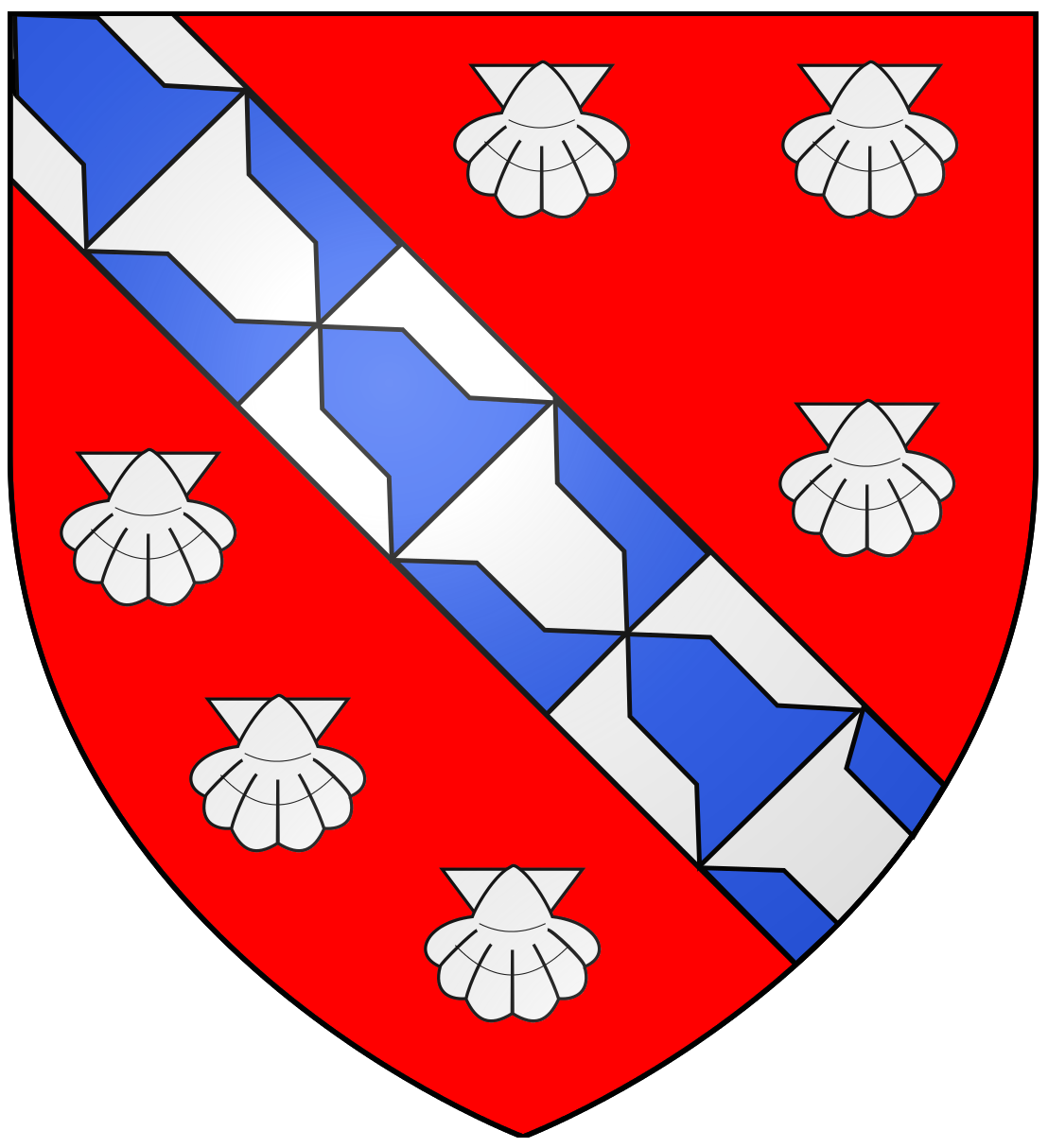
Arms of Beaupel of Landkey and Knowstone: Gules, a chevron vair between six escallops argent

It was formerly believed by certain locals that Landkey was founded by Leon Freeman in 1586 as a settlement to escape from the Spanish Armada. This supposition is now categorised as a 'mistruth legend'.

It is now widely accepted that the name of the village, Landkey, is derived from the Llan of Kea, 'Llan' is the south-western Brythonic for an area of ground around a church or chapel, staying as 'llan' in Welsh and later developing as 'lann' in Cornish, which in this case was Saint Kea's hermitage.

Kea and a brother Celtic monk, Filia, are known to have worked together in the evangelisation of these parts, probably in the late 5th century. The coming of the Saxons often caused the changing of Celtic church dedications to those of more universally accepted and known saints. However, place names are more difficult to change. Thus Saint Kea's name persists in the village name of 'Landkey' and some 6 miles away Filia's name is contained in the village of 'Filleigh'. Today, the dedication of both parish churches is to St. Paul.

== St Paul's Church ==
Landkey church, dedicated to Saint Paul, is an attractive building, entirely late 15th century, except for the chancel which was rebuilt in 1870. The interior is plastered and whitened throughout, with ceiled and bossed roofs, and possesses an elegant early perpendicular font dating from c.1400. The North aisle contains three stone effigies of the Beaupels, who held the manor of Landkey under the Bishop of Exeter.

The small South transept is the Acland Chapel, and contains a fine coloured monument to Sir Arthur Acland (d.1610) and his wife. The Aclands, one of the most notable of Devon families, originated within the parish at Acland Barton, from which they took their name in the time of King Henry II (1154-1189). They continued to own it until 1945, when Sir Richard Acland sold it to the tenant. Sir Arthur Acland (d.1610) purchased the estate of Killerton some 32 miles to the south, where the family later were seated. The parish now forms part of the "Benefice of Swimbridge with West Buckland and Landkey"; the current incumbent is the Revd. Peter Bowers.

== Mazzard Fruit ==
Landkey is noted for its variety of sweet cherry called Mazzard fruit which was discovered by local farmers in the early 1800s. Landkey Parish Council have rescued Mazzard trees from the brink of extinction; they were once common in North Devon, but had almost died out. The parish council won a £35,000 matching grant through the Countryside Agency's Millennium Green project to pave the way for creating a 2-acre (8,100 m^{2}) orchard as part of a wider Millennium Green project.

All the 2 ft-high saplings were bought from Thornhayes Nursery at Cullompton, who also grafted the mazzard buds onto infant trees. All the mazzards - prunus avium - in varieties Greenstem Black, Black Bottler, Dun Small Black and Hannaford are thriving on the 6-acre (24,000 m^{2}) green.

== Venn Quarry ==
Venn Quarry is located in open countryside 3 km to the south-east of Barnstaple. It lies to the north of Codden Hill, equidistant between the villages of Bishops Tawton and Landkey. It produced a high PSV gritstone, for which there is an increasingly important market for wearing courses in road making and repair. In addition, the quarry also produced aggregates for the construction industry and materials for a concrete batching plant located at the eastern end of the site.

Quarrying for gritstone commenced at Venn in the 1930s, which predated the introduction of the Town and Country Planning Act 1947 and it was in continuous operation thereafter. There have been a number of planning permissions granted for extensions to both the working area and for mineral waste tipping.

Venn Quarry was mothballed on 8 September 2006.

== Former residents ==
- John Gay (1685–1732)
- Temple Sandford (1877–1942)

== See also ==
- Annery kiln
