= Broadclyst =

Village in Devon, England

Coordinates: 50°46′N 3°26′W

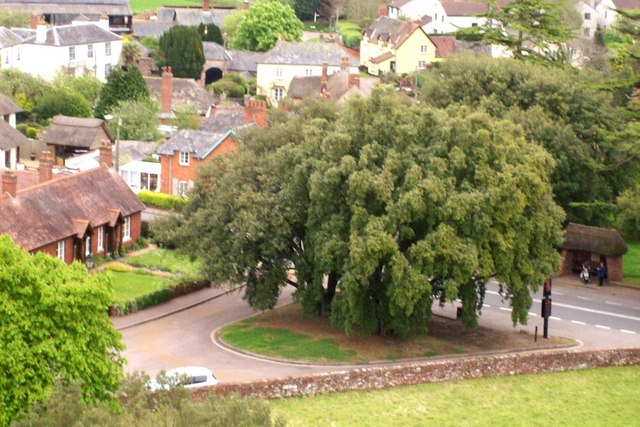
- Broadclyst

- Location within Devon
- Population: 1,552 (2021 census)
- Civil parish: Broad Clyst
- District: East Devon
- Shire county: Devon
- Region: South West
- Country: England
- Sovereign state: United Kingdom
- UK Parliament: Exmouth and Exeter East
- Website: http://www.broadclyst.org/

Broadclyst is a village and civil parish in the East Devon local government district. It lies approximately 4.5 miles (7 km) northeast of the city of Exeter, Devon, England, on the B3181. In 2011 its population was 1,467, increasing at the 2021 Census to 1,552. An electoral ward with the same name exists whose population at the above census was 7,083.

== Parish church ==
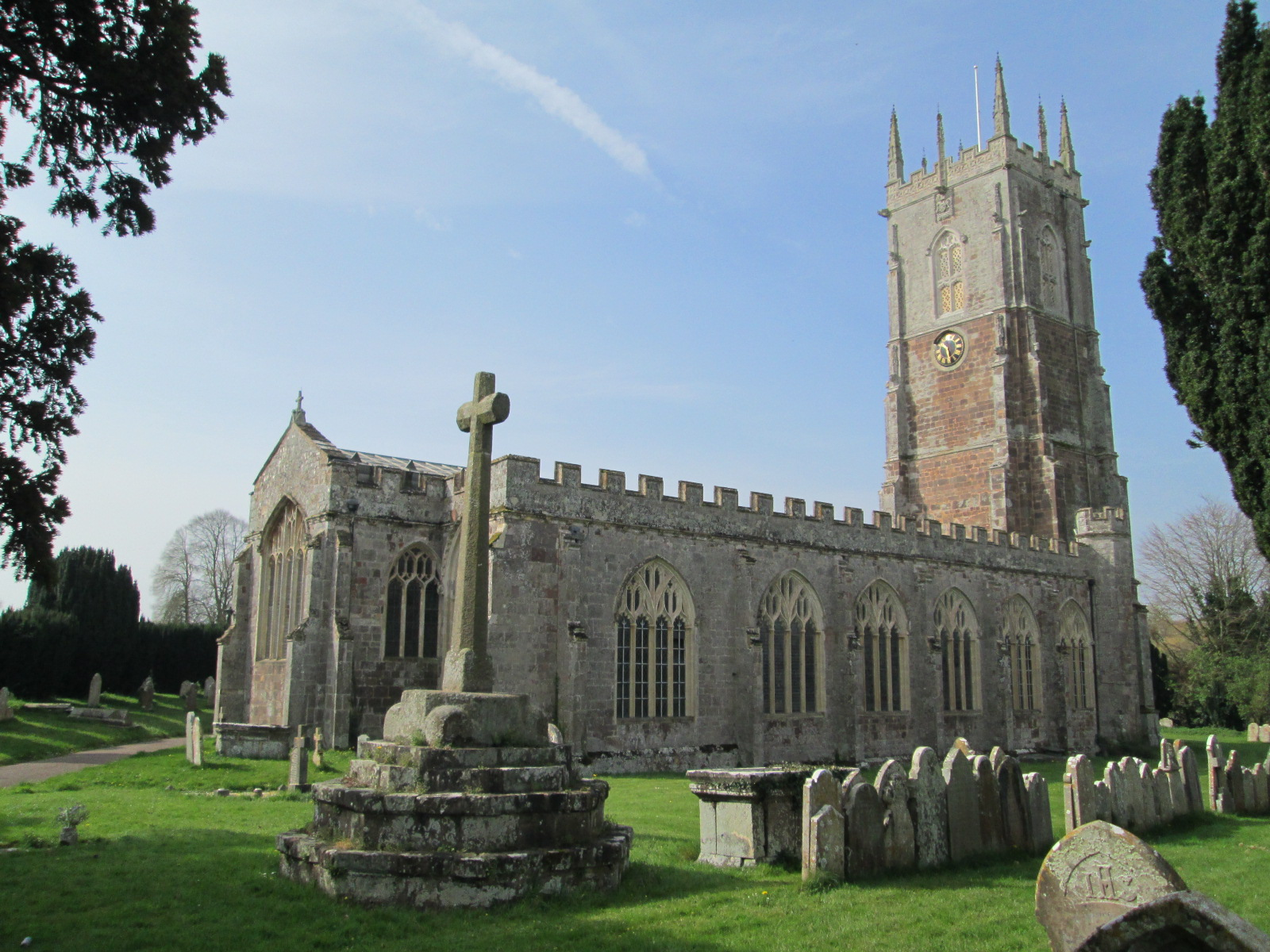
Broadclyst church

Its church is 15th century, with an ancient cross. It has many battlements, pinnacles and gargoyles. According to the Anglo-Saxon Chronicle, in the year 1001, the manor at Broad Clyst was burned down by Danish invaders.

== Communications ==
On 16 October 1975, the nearby M5 opened and the trunk road A38 that ran through the village became quiet, later being reclassified B3181.

Broadclyst railway station was opened in 1860 by the London and South Western Railway on its London Waterloo to Exeter line. It closed in 1966 but some of the buildings remain.

== Amenities and historic buildings ==
Killerton House, a National Trust property, is close to the village. The Clyst Vale Community College secondary school is located in Dog Village.

Broadclyst Cricket Club play within the grounds of the Killerton Estate. They have been playing here since 1974.

Churchill Farm is the origin of the name of the Churchill family.

=== Marker's Cottage ===
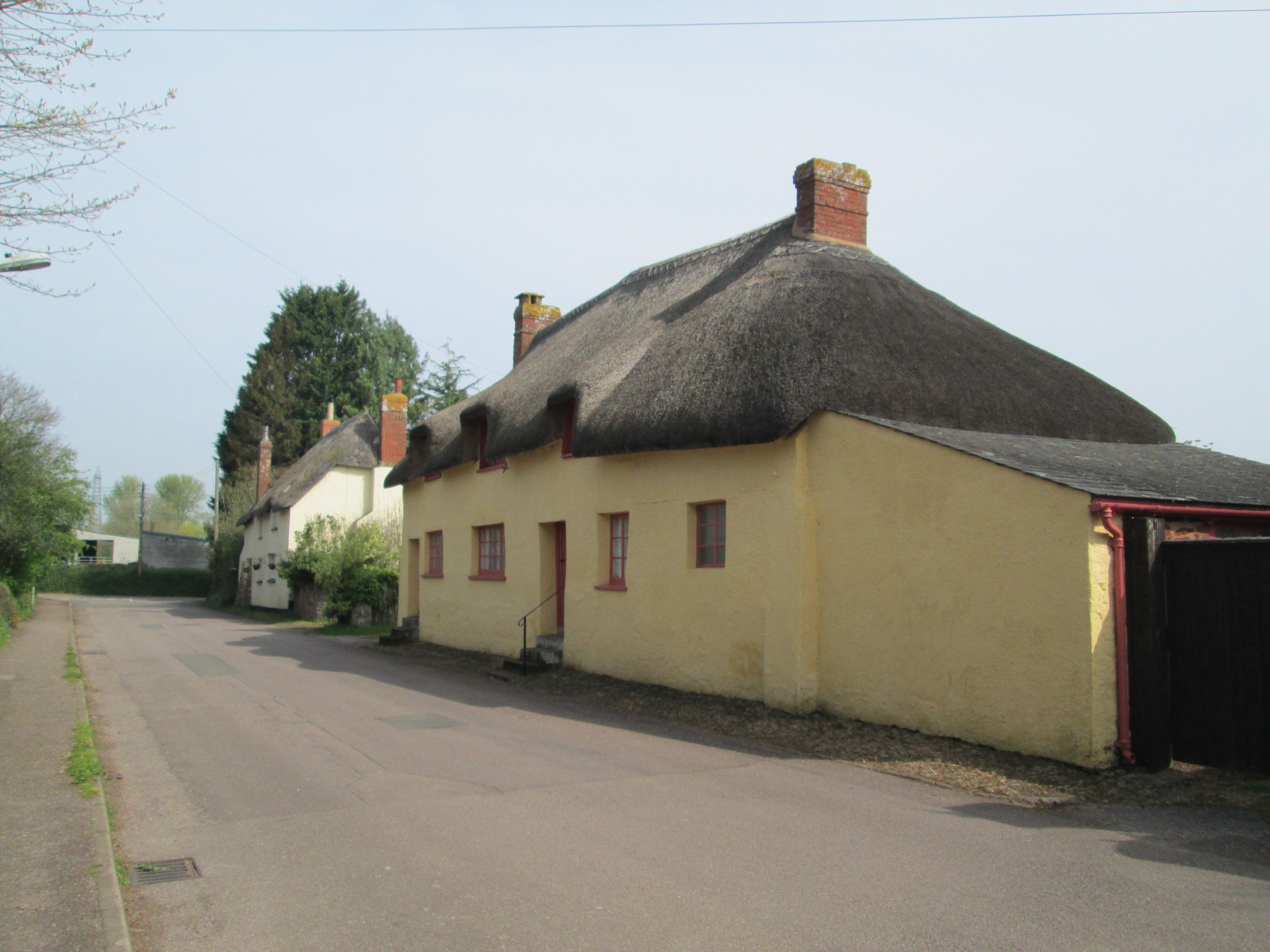
Marker's Cottage

Marker's Cottage, in the Townend part of the village, is a Grade II* listed building and a National Trust property, named after Sarah Marker, its resident about 200 years ago. It has cob walls and a thatched roof, and was built in the 15th century with later alterations. Oak screens between the hall and parlour are painted with images, dated stylistically 1470–1510; there is a large stair turret, built in the 17th century.

== Twinning ==
Broadclyst has been twinned since 2006 with the French village of Plobannalec-Lesconil, in southern Finistère in Brittany, a link formalised in 2010.
