= Dyke baronets =

Title in the Baronetage of England

Arms of Dyke: Or, three cinquefoils sable

The Dyke Baronetcy, of Horeham in the County of Sussex, is a title in the Baronetage of England. It was created on 3 March 1677 for Thomas Dyke, Commissioner of Public Accounts and Member of Parliament for Sussex and East Grinstead. The 2nd Baronet married Anne Hart, daughter and heiress of Percival Hart. In 1836 the 5th Baronet unsuccessfully claimed the barony of Braye, of which peerage he was a co-heir through the Hart family. The 7th Baronet was a Conservative politician. Percyvall Hart Dyke (1872–1952), grandson of Reverend Thomas Hart Dyke, second son of the 5th Baronet, was a Colonel in the Indian Army. His son Trevor Hart Dyke was a Brigadier in the Queen's Royal Regiment. David Hart Dyke (b. 1938), son of Reverend Eric Hart Dyke, son of the aforementioned Colonel Percyvall Hart Dyke, is a retired Captain in the Royal Navy and commanded HMS Coventry during the Falklands War. His daughter Miranda Hart is a writer, comedian, and actress.

== Dyke family ==
The Dyke family originated at Dykesfield, Cumberland and branches later settled at Henfield in Sussex and at Cranbrook in Kent. Reginald de Dike of Cranbrook was Sheriff of Kent in 1355. Thomas Dyke (d.1632) of Cranbrook married Joan Walsh, heiress of the manor of Horeham in the parish of Waldron in Sussex, which thus passed to the Dykes.

=== Somerset branch ===
Another prominent branch of the Dyke family, which uses the same arms, was a major landholder in Somerset in the 17th and 18th centuries, with branches seated at Tetton, Holnicote and Pixton. The heiress of all these branches was Elizabeth Dyke (d.1753), daughter of Thomas Dyke of Tetton, who married Sir Thomas Dyke Acland, 7th Baronet (1722-1785), of Killerton in Devon and Petherton Park in Somerset, who in accordance with the terms of his wife's "princely inheritance" adopted the additional surname of Dyke.

== Present day ==
In 2015 the holder of the title was David William Hart-Dyke the 10th Baronet, who lives in Canada, and who in 2008 stood in the 40th Canadian General Election as the Green Party candidate for Hamilton East—Stoney Creek, Ontario. He is unmarried and the heir presumptive to the baronetcy is his first cousin Tom Hart Dyke.

== Dyke baronets, of Horeham, Sussex (1677) ==
- Sir Thomas Dyke, 1st Baronet (c. 1650–1706)
- Sir Thomas Dyke, 2nd Baronet (c. 1700–1756)
- Sir John Dixon Dyke, 3rd Baronet (1732–1810)
- Sir Thomas Dyke, 4th Baronet (1763–1831)
- Sir Percival Hart Dyke, 5th Baronet (1767–1846)
- Sir Percyvall Hart Dyke, 6th Baronet (1799–1875)
  - Lieutenant Percyvall Hart Dyke (1836–1855)
- Sir William Hart Dyke, 7th Baronet (1837–1931)
  - Percyvall Hart Dyke (1871–1922)
  - William Montagu Hart Dyke (1877–1877)
- Sir Oliver Hamilton Augustus Hart Dyke, 8th Baronet (1885–1969)
- Sir Derek William Hart Dyke, 9th Baronet (1924–1987), son.
- Sir David William Hart Dyke, 10th Baronet (born 1955), son.

The heir presumptive to the baronetcy is Thomas Guy Hart Dyke (born 1976), first cousin of the 10th baronet and grandson of the eighth baronet.
