= Devon and Somerset Staghounds =

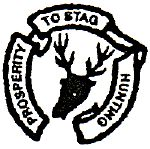
Prosperity to Stag Hunting, the badge of the Devon and Somerset Staghounds

The red deer of Exmoor have been hunted since Norman times, when Exmoor was declared a Royal Forest. Collyns stated the earliest record of a pack of Staghounds on Exmoor was 1598. In 1803, the "North Devon Staghounds" became a subscription pack. In 1824/5, 30 couples of hounds, the last of the true staghounds, were sold to a baron in Germany. Today, the Devon and Somerset is one of three staghounds packs in the UK, the others being the Quantock Staghounds and the Tiverton Staghounds. All packs hunt within Devon and Somerset. The Chairman as of 2016 is Tom Yandle, who was previously High Sheriff of Somerset in 1999.

== Seasons before hunting with hounds became illegal in 2004 ==
The approximate dates of the hunting season are:

- Hind hunting: 1 November-28 February
- Stag hunting:
  - Autumn: August to third week in October; formerly 12 August to 8 October, according to Collyns
  - Spring: last week of March; continues about three weeks

== List of masters ==
- "Hugh Pollard", master in 1598. (Sir Hugh II Pollard of King's Nympton, father of Sir Lewis Pollard, 1st Baronet (c. 1578–c. 1645))

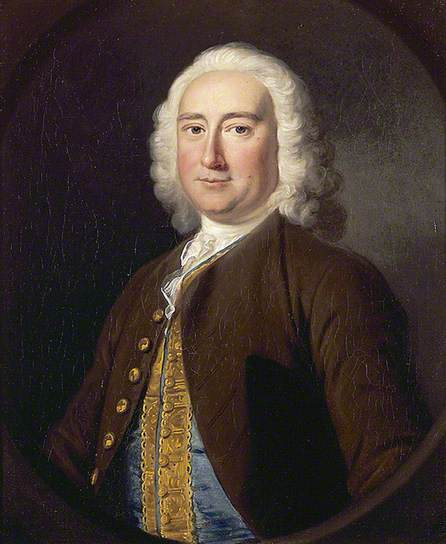
Edward II Dyke (d. 1746), portrait circa 1741 attributed to Thomas Hudson (1701–1779), National Trust, Collection of Dunster Castle

- Edward Dyke (d. 1746), of Pixton, in Somerset, (eldest brother of Thomas Dyke (d. 1745) of Tetton and of John Dyke (d. 1732) of Holnicote, all in Somerset), was the warden and lessee of the royal forest of Exmoor and Master of Staghounds, which office usually was held by the warder. He married Margaret Trevelyan, a daughter of Sir John Trevelyan, 2nd Baronet (1670–1755), of Nettlecombe in Somerset, and widow of Alexander Luttrell (1705–1737) of Dunster Castle. Edward inherited Holnicote and estates in Bampton from his brother John Dyke (d. 1732), who died without progeny. He too died without progeny and bequeathed Pixton and Holnicote to his niece Elizabeth Dyke (d. 1753), whom he appointed his sole executor, daughter and sole heiress of his brother Thomas Dyke (d. 1745) of Tetton, Kingston St Mary, Somerset. The bequest stipulated that Elizabeth and her husband Sir Thomas Acland, 7th Baronet (1722–1785) of Killerton in Devon and Petherton Park in Somerset, should adopt the additional surname of Dyke.

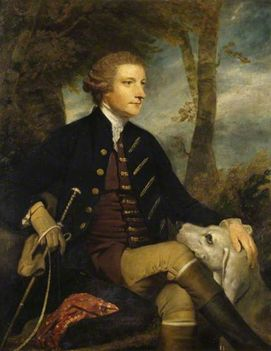
Sir Thomas Dyke Acland, 7th Baronet (1723–1785) painted in 1767 by Sir Joshua Reynolds. The bloodline of the large staghound with its head on his knee was lost when the pack was sold to Germany in 1824, and later rebuilt from foxhounds. Two identical versions exist, both owned by the National Trust, one at Saltram House, the other at Killerton House, both in Devon

- 1746-1775 Sir Thomas Dyke Acland, 7th Baronet (1722–1785), of Killerton in Devon and of Petherton Park, Tetton, Holnicote and Pixton, all in Somerset, kept his own pack of staghounds. He became forester or ranger of Exmoor under grant from the Crown and "hunted the country in almost princely style. Respected and beloved by all the countryside, he was solicited at the same time to allow himself to be returned as member of Parliament for the counties of Devon and Somerset. He preferred, however, the duties and pleasures of life in the country, where he bore without abuse the grand old name of gentleman". Although he had three of his own kennels on his huge estates, at Holnicote in the north and at Jury and Highercombe near Pixton in the south, he had a further method of keeping hounds, which was to make the keeping of one hound a term in many of the tenancy contracts he granted. In his manor of Bossington (near Holnicote) alone an estate survey of 1746–7 lists twelve tenements let, either by Acland or Dyke, with the requirement to keep a hound. In 1775 he handed over the mastership to the then Major Basset, and in 1779 his beloved collection of stag heads and antlers at Holnicote was lost in a fire which also destroyed the house. He declared that "he minded the destruction of his valuables less bitterly than the loss of his fine collection of stags' heads". He was known on his estates as "Sir Thomas his Honour" (as later was his son the 9th Baronet) and was renowned for his generous hospitality at Holnicote or at Pixton, whichever was closest, to all riders "in at the death", and it is said that "open house was kept at Pixton and Holnicote throughout the hunting season". Pixton was the larger establishment, richly equipped with silver-plate and linen, including 73 tablecloths, but both houses had silver dinner services of five dozen plates and any number of tankards, cups, bowls, dishes and salvers. A letter dated 1759 written on behalf of Courtenay Walrond of Bradfield, Uffculme describes the Acland hospitality:

"This noble chase being ended, my master, his brother and Mr Brutton with about 20 gentlemen more waited on Sir Thomas Acland at Pixton where each of them drank the health of the stag in a full quart glass of claret placed in the stag's mouth & after drinking several proper healths they went in good order to their respective beds about 2 o'clock and dined with Sir Thomas the next day on a haunch of the noble creature and about 50 dishes of the greatest rarities among which were several black grouse".

He returned briefly as joint-master in August 1784, but died in February 1785, aged 63

=== North Devon Staghounds ===
- 1775-1784 Col. Francis Basset Esq. (c.1740-1802), of Heanton Court, Heanton Punchardon, near Barnstaple, and of Umberleigh House, Umberleigh, Lt. Col. of the North Devon Militia 1779-93), MP for Barnstaple 1780-84. He is not however stated in his History of Parliament biography to have been a colonel, or a military man in any capacity, yet was termed "Col. Bassett" by the Devon topographer Rev. John Swete in his 1796 painting of Heanton Court, Heanton Punchardon, near Barnstaple, which he described as the seat of "Col. Basset". He was the second but only surviving son of John Francis Basset (1714–1757) by his wife Eleanor Courtenay, daughter of Sir William Courtenay, 2nd Baronet and de jure 6th Earl of Devon. He died unmarried, being the last in the male line of the Heanton branch of the ancient Basset family. His heir was his nephew Joseph Davie (1764-1846) of Orleigh Court, near Bideford, who took the name Basset in lieu of his patronymic and built Watermouth Castle, near Lynmouth.He was the son of John Davie of Orleigh by his wife Eleanora Bassett, sister of Col. Bassett (d.1802). Joseph's granddaughter and eventual heiress was Harriet Mary Bassett (d.1920), who married Charles Henry Williams, who assumed the surname Bassett as a condition of inheriting his wife's property, and became master 1887-93 (see below). The Basset family is an ancient West Country family, which originated either in the manor of Tehidy, Cornwall or at Whitechapel Manor in the parish of Bishops Nympton, Devon.

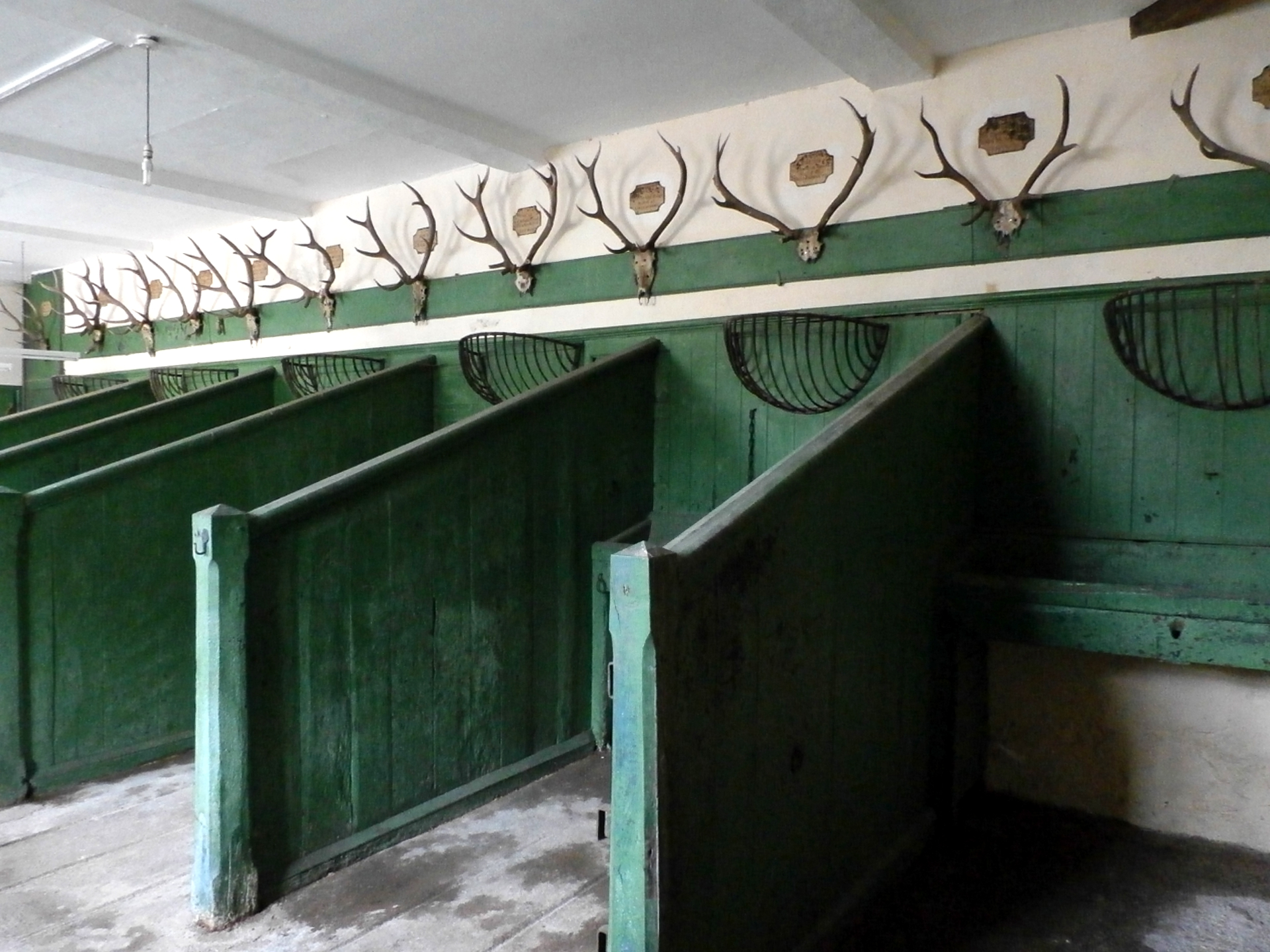
Stalls in stable block built by Sir Thomas Dyke Acland, 9th Baronet (1752–1794) at Holnicote, now owned by the National Trust. The thirty stag heads on the walls date from about 1787 to 1793 and were killed under his mastership of the Devon and Somerset Staghounds. Some of the brow points of the antlers were notoriously sawn-off by a groom because they interfered with the loading of hay into the mangers. A similar collection of stag heads amassed by his father the 7th Baronet, and much beloved by the latter, was destroyed during a fire at Holnicote in 1779

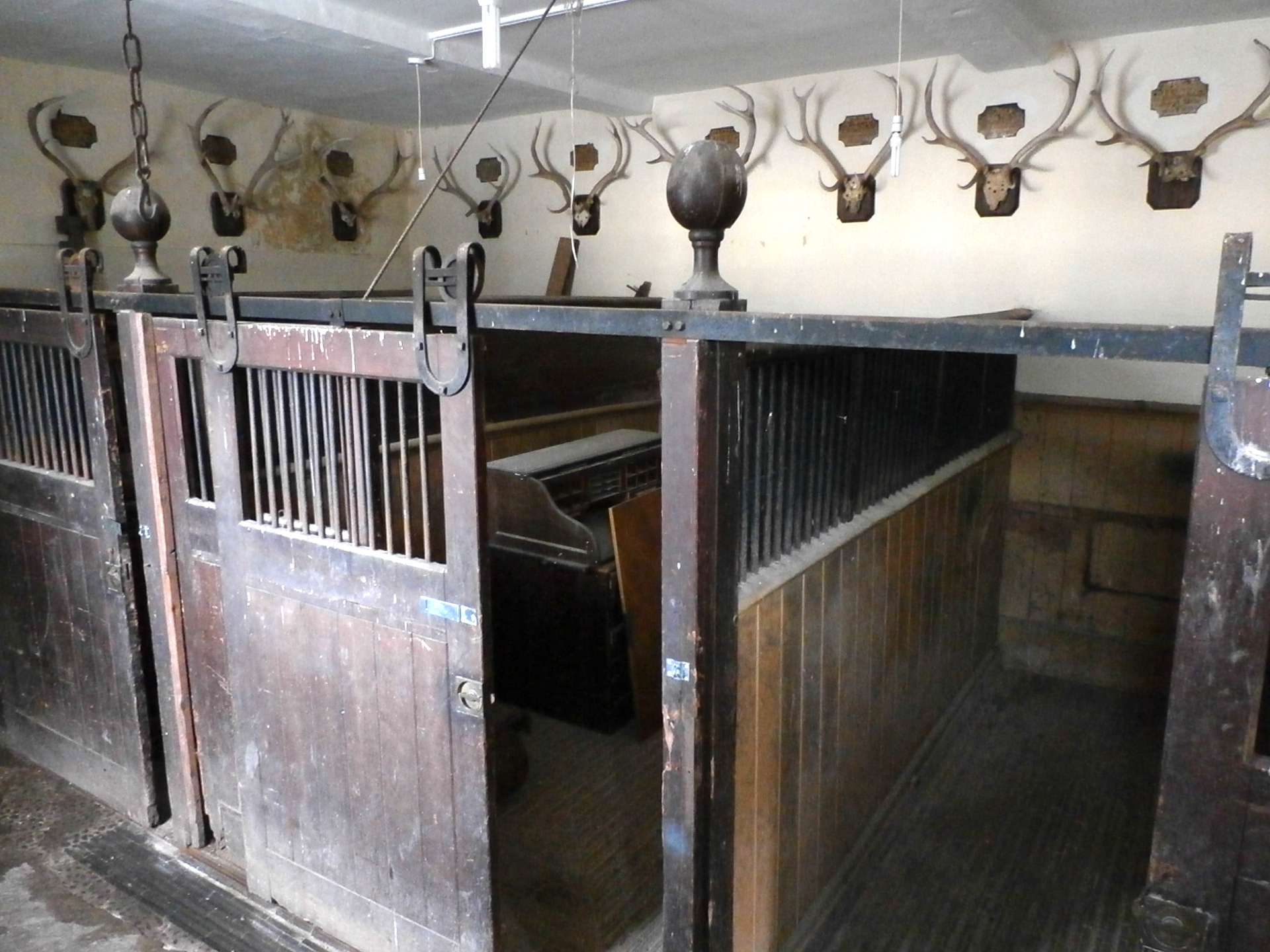
Loose boxes in stable block built by Sir Thomas Dyke Acland, 9th Baronet (1752–1794) at Holnicote, with his stag head trophies

- 1784-1794 Sir Thomas Dyke Acland, 9th Baronet (1752-1794), second son of the 7th Baronet who was master 1746-1775. He devoted the last ten years of his life almost entirely to staghunting and virtually abandoned the family's main seat at Killerton, preferring to live almost entirely at Holnicote and at Highercombe, near Dulverton, in the heart of the hunting country. He killed 101 stags during his mastership, the antlers of thirty of which are still affixed to the walls of the stables at Holnicote. He also succeeded Col. Basset as Lt.Col. of the North Devon Militia (1793-4).
- August 1802- Hugh Fortescue, 1st Earl Fortescue (1753–1841) of Castle Hill, Filleigh and Weare Hall, Weare Giffard.
- 1824 pack sold to Germany.

=== Chichester's Hounds ===
- 1827-1833 - Sir Arthur Chichester, 7th Baronet (1790–1842), of Youlston Park, Shirwell, formed his own pack composed of foxhounds
- 1833/4-1836/7 - No hounds

=== Devon and Somerset Staghounds ===
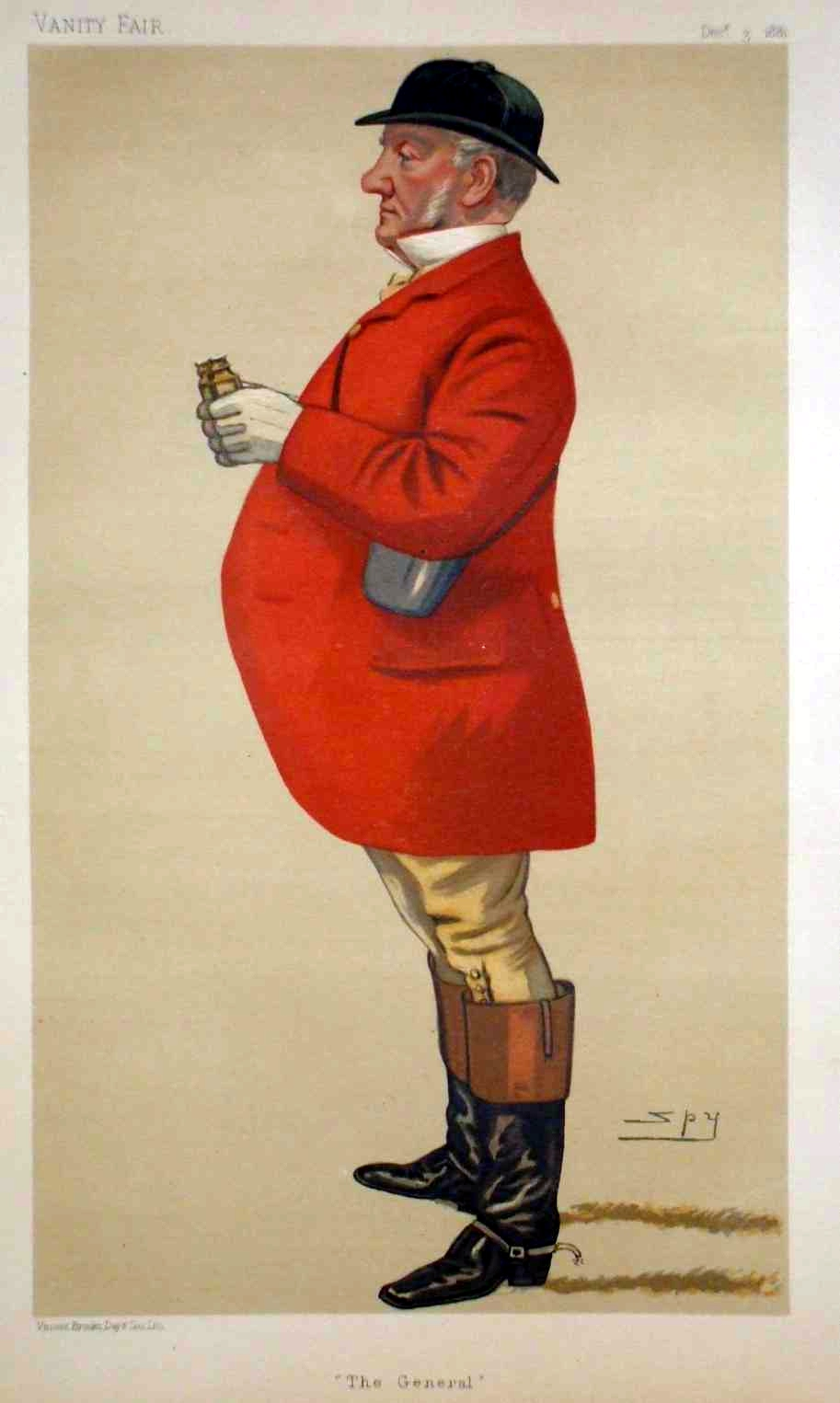
"The General". Mordaunt Fenwick-Bisset, MP, (1825–1884), Master 1855-1881, as caricatured by Spy in Vanity Fair, December 1881. He built the present kennels in Exford in 1876 and donated them to the Committee.

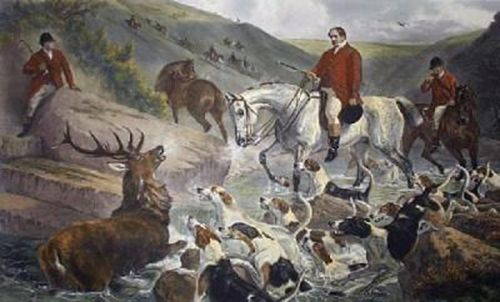
Portrait of Mordaunt Fenwick-Bisset, MSH, on his favourite hunter Chanticleer, with a stag at bay in Badgworthy Water, Exmoor, by Samuel John Carter, 1871

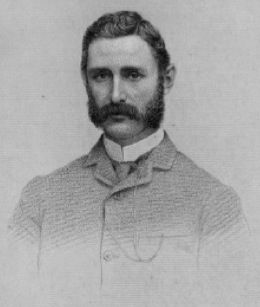
Viscount Ebrington, from 1905 Hugh Fortescue, 4th Earl Fortescue (1854–1932). Engraving by Joseph Brown from a photograph by John Mayall. He acquired the whole of the former Royal Forest of Exmoor after the death of Frederick Winn Knight in 1897

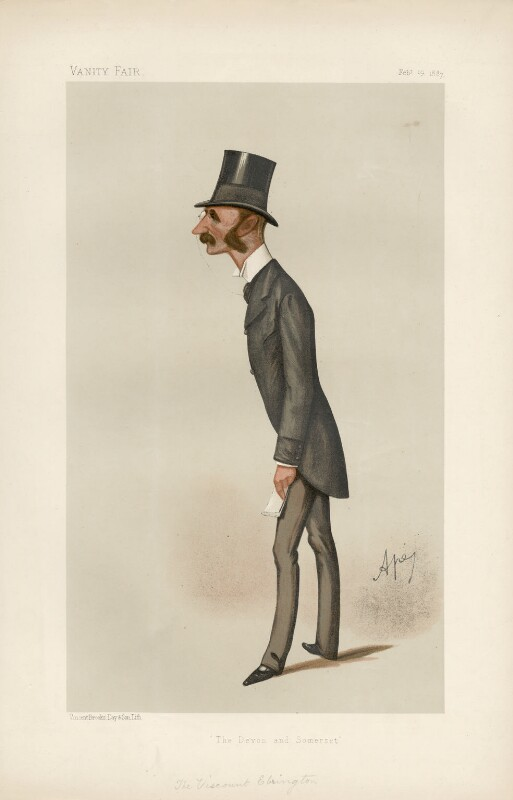
"The Devon and Somerset", caricature of Viscount Ebrington by Ape, Vanity Fair 19 February 1887

- 1837–1841 – Charles Palk Collyns (1793–1864) formed a new pack, named the "Devon and Somerset Subscription Staghounds". His hunting diaries and subscription lists are held by Somerset Archives. He wrote the standard work on West Country stag-hunting Chase of the Wild Red Deer, 1862.
- 1842–1847 – Newton Fellowes (1772–Jan. 1854), of Eggesford, brother-in-law of Hugh Fortescue, 2nd Earl Fortescue.
- 1855–1881 – Mordaunt Fenwick-Bisset (1825–1884). "Restored the sport and put it on the footing from whence the present flourishing state of things has come", (Everard, 1902, p. 366). He reintroduced red deer to the Quantock Hills and built kennels at Bagborough House, a few miles northwest of Taunton.
- 1880/81–1887 – Hugh Fortescue, Viscount Ebrington.

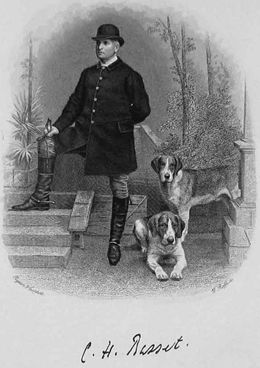
Charles Henry Basset, MSH 1887-1893. Baily's Magazine of Sports & Pastimes, no. 380, October 1891, vol. 56

- 1887–1893 – Charles Henry Basset, Esq. (1834–1908), (born Williams) of Watermouth Castle, near Lynmouth, JP, DL and MP for Barnstaple (1868–1874). He married on 7 January 1878, Harriet Mary Basset.

- 1893-1895 Colonel F. Hornby, who had previously been Field Master of the Queen's Staghounds. Entered office July 1893, resigned in Spring 1895 and went on in 1895 to be Master of the Essex Union Foxhounds.

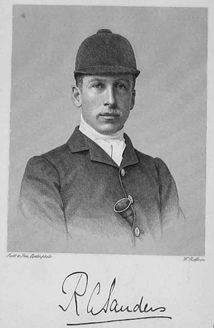
Robert Arthur Sanders MSH 1895-1907 (Baron Bayford from 1929). Portrait from Baily's Magazine of Sports & Pastimes, no. 475, September 1899, vol. 72

- 1895-1907 Robert Arthur Sanders (1867–1940) (Baron Bayford from 1929). He married Miss Lucy Halliday, of Glenthorne, near Lynton, at Oare Church in July 1893. He married Lucy Sophia in 1893. E.J. Stanley offered Mr Sanders to maintain a separate pack to hunt the Quantocks deer. The Committee and Master agreed and made over the country on permanent loan. His son, Edmund Stanley, then aged 22 performed the duty of huntsman. On his acceptance of the mastership of the D&S the Quantocks pack was discontinued.
- c. 1909 – c. 1911 – Captain Adkins
- 1911/12–1914 – Major Morland John Greig, of Edgcott House, Exford. Killed in action at Gallipoli in October 1915 fighting with the 1st Royal North Devon Yeomanry. Dick Lloyd, President of the D&SSH, spoke in 2001 as follows about Morland Greig:
- 1915-c.1917 - Committee
- c.1917-1919/20 - William Badco (1864–1921) of Cardiff,

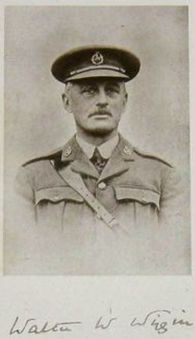
Colonel Walter William Wiggin (1856–1936), Queen's Own Worcestershire Yeomanry, Master of the Devon and Somerset Staghounds c. 1917–1936, of Forhill House, King's Norton, photograph published in Baily's Magazine, no. 720, February 1920, vol. 113

- c. 1917-23 April 1936 – Lieutenant-Colonel Walter William Wiggin (1856–1936). He was a son of Sir Henry Samuel Wiggin, 1st Baronet.
- 1935/6-end of World War II – Hancock of Rhyll Manor, East Anstey. Abbott
- 1981–present – Maurice Scott (joint-master)
- 1987–present – Diana Scott (joint-master)
- 2000/1–present – George Witheridge (joint-master)
- -present – Fran Bell (joint-master)

== Kennels ==
- late 1700s: Highercombe, Dulverton (Sir Thomas Acland)
- 1812-1818 Castle Hill, Filleigh (Earl Fortescue)
- up to 1861 Jury, Dulverton
- 1861-1876 Rhyll, East Anstey.
- 1876–present Exford. Built by Mr Bisset and donated to the Committee.

== Sources ==
- Huskisson, Mike, The Persecution of Red Deer on and around Exmoor and the Quantocks; A Review of the Literature
- Macdermot, E.T. The Devon and Somerset Staghounds, 1936
- Bailey's Hunting Directory
- Aldin, Cecil. Exmoor: The Riding Playground of England, 1935
- Collyns, Charles Palk. Chase of the Wild Red Deer, 1862
- Scarth-Dixon, William, "Devon and Somerset Staghounds" (booklet)
- Vowles, Alfred. Stag-hunting on Exmoor, 1920
- Bourne, Hope. A Little History of Exmoor, 1968
- Evered, Philip. Staghunting with the Devon and Somerset: An Account of the Chase of the Wild Red Deer, 1902. Everard was elected treasurer, secretary and administrator of the deer damage fund on the resignation of Mr. A. C. E. Locke in 1894.
