= Henry Herbert, 3rd Earl of Carnarvon =

British politician

The Right Honourable The Earl of Carnarvon FRS
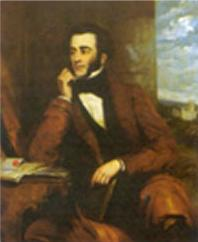
- The Earl of Carnarvon

Personal details
- Born: 8 June 1800 London, England
- Died: 10 December 1849 (aged 49) Pusey, Oxfordshire
- Party: Tory
- Spouse: Henrietta Anna Howard-Molyneux-Howard (m. 1830)
- Children: 5, including Henry and Auberon
- Parent(s): Henry Herbert, 2nd Earl of Carnarvon; Elizabeth Kitty Acland
- Education: Christ Church, Oxford

Henry John George Herbert, 3rd Earl of Carnarvon, FRS (8 June 1800 – 10 December 1849), styled Lord Porchester from 1811 to 1833, was a British writer, traveller, and politician.

== Background and education ==
Herbert was born in London, the eldest son of Henry Herbert, 2nd Earl of Carnarvon and Elizabeth "Kitty" Acland, daughter of John Dyke Acland of Pixton Park in Somerset. He was educated at Eton College and Christ Church, Oxford. He wrote the tragedy Don Pedro, King of Castile which was staged at Drury Lane in 1828 with William Macready and Ellen Kean.

== Public life ==
In 1831, Porchester was elected to the House of Commons for Wootton Bassett as a Tory, a seat he held until the following year when the constituency was abolished by the Great Reform Act. In 1833 he succeeded his father in the earldom and entered the House of Lords. He was elected a Fellow of the Royal Society in 1841. It was during Carnarvon's lifetime that the family seat of Highclere Castle was redesigned and rebuilt by Sir Charles Barry into a Victorian mansion.

== Cricket ==
Herbert played in 1822 when he was recorded in one match, totalling 1 run with a highest score of 1 and holding 2 catches.

== Marriage and issue ==
In 1830, Lord Carnarvon married Henrietta Anna Howard-Molyneux-Howard (died 1876), eldest daughter of Lord Henry Howard-Molyneux-Howard (younger brother of the 12th Duke of Norfolk), by whom he had three sons and three daughters:

- Henry Howard Molyneux Herbert, 4th Earl of Carnarvon (1831–1890), a prominent Conservative politician.
- Lady Eveline Alicia Juliana Howard Herbert (21 December 1834 – 30 September 1906), who married Isaac Newton Wallop, 5th Earl of Portsmouth. Her memorial stained-glass window survives in Brushford Church in Somerset, near her father's mansion at Pixton Park.
- The Hon. Alan Percy Harty Molyneux Howard Herbert (21 November 1836 – 8 March 1907), a physician who was awarded the Legion of Honour by the French government in 1871 for his service as a doctor during the siege of Paris in the Franco-Prussian War, and remained there as the physician in charge of the Hertford Hospital until 1901. He inherited the estate of Tetton (a former Acland property) from his first cousin Edward Henry Charles Herbert (1837–1870), only son of Edward Charles Hugh Herbert (1802–1852) of Tetton, MP for Callington, second son of Henry Herbert, 2nd Earl of Carnarvon, husband of the heiress Kitty Acland.
- Hon. Auberon Edward William Molyneux Howard Herbert (1838–1906), a writer, theorist, philosopher, and individualist, an MP for Nottingham 1870–1874.
- Lady Grace Herbert (born and died 10 December 1840), who survived only a few hours
- Lady Gwendolen Ondine Herbert (18 August 1842 – 23 October 1915), died unmarried

== Death ==
He died at Pusey, Oxfordshire, in December 1849, aged 49. He was succeeded in the earldom by his eldest son, Henry Herbert, 4th Earl of Carnarvon.

Parliament of the United Kingdom
Preceded by Viscount Mahon; Thomas Hyde Villiers	Member of Parliament for Wootton Bassett; 1831–1832; With: Viscount Mahon	Constituency abolished
Peerage of Great Britain
Preceded by Henry George Herbert	Earl of Carnarvon; 1833–1849	Succeeded by Henry Howard Herbert
