= Stephen Fox-Strangways, 1st Earl of Ilchester =

British peer and Member of Parliament

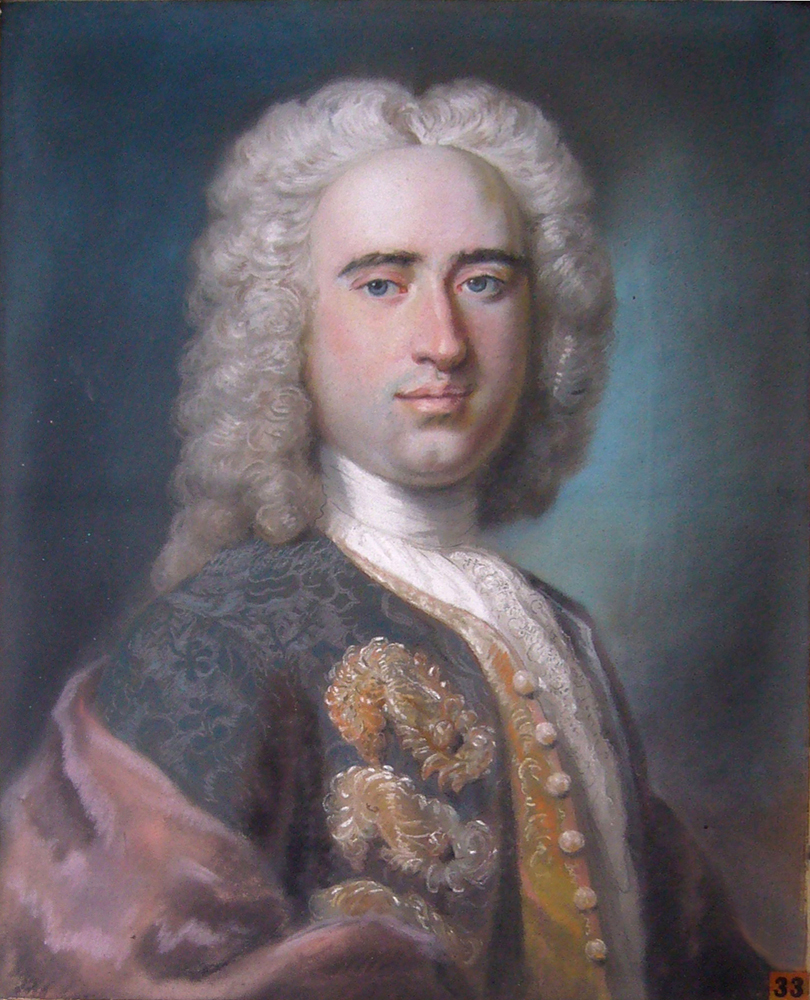

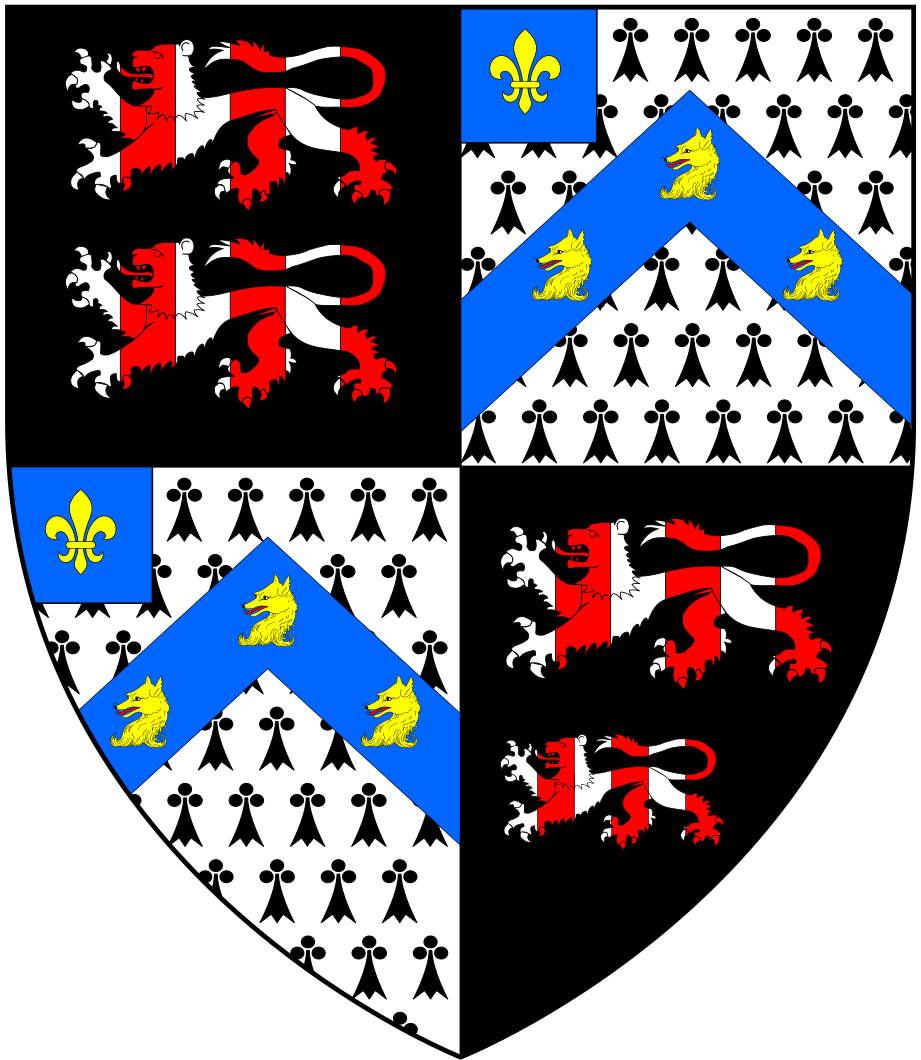
- Coat of arms
- Tenure: Baron Ilchester 1741–1776; Baron Ilchester and Stavordale 1747–1776; Earl of Ilchester 1756–1776
- Predecessor: New Creation
- Successor: Henry Fox-Strangways, 2nd Earl of Ilchester
- Born: Stephen Fox; 12 September 1704
- Died: 26 September 1776 (aged 72)
- Spouse: Elizabeth Horner (m. 1735)
- Issue: Lady Susan Fox-Strangways; Lady Charlotte Fox-Strangways; Lady Juliana Fox-Strangways; Henry Fox-Strangways, 2nd Earl of Ilchester; Lady Lucy Fox-Strangways; Lady Harriet Fox-Strangways; Lt.-Col. Stephen Fox-Strangways; Lady Frances Fox-Strangways; Rev. Charles Fox-Strangways

Stephen Fox-Strangways, 1st Earl of Ilchester PC (né Fox; 12 September 1704 – 26 September 1776) was a British peer and Member of Parliament.

== Origins ==
Fox was the eldest surviving son of Sir Stephen Fox (1627–1716), the first Paymaster of the Forces, deemed the "richest commoner in the three kingdoms", by his second wife Christiana Hope. His younger brother was Henry Fox, who was created Baron Holland, of Holland House in Kensington, the father of the Whig statesman Charles James Fox.

== Career ==
He was educated at Eton College and Christ Church, Oxford, then took a Grand Tour. On his father's death in 1716, he inherited (among other estates) Redlynch Park in Somerset, where he improved both the house and gardens. He purchased further land in Wiltshire and Somerset. His father had been appointed to the lucrative post of Paymaster of the Forces under King Charles II, from which post he had made his huge fortune.

In 1726 Fox was elected as a Member of Parliament for Shaftesbury in Dorset, a seat he held until 1741. He served as Secretary to the Treasury from 1739 to 1741. In 1741 he was raised to the peerage of Great Britain and joined the House of Lords as Baron Ilchester of Ilchester in the County of Somerset and Baron Strangways of Woodford in the County of Dorset; In 1747 he was created Baron Ilchester and Stavordale of Redlynch, in the County of Somerset, with special remainder in default of male issue of his own to his younger brother Henry Fox, and in 1756 was further honoured when he was made Earl of Ilchester, with the same special remainder. In 1763 he was admitted to the Privy Council.

== Private life ==
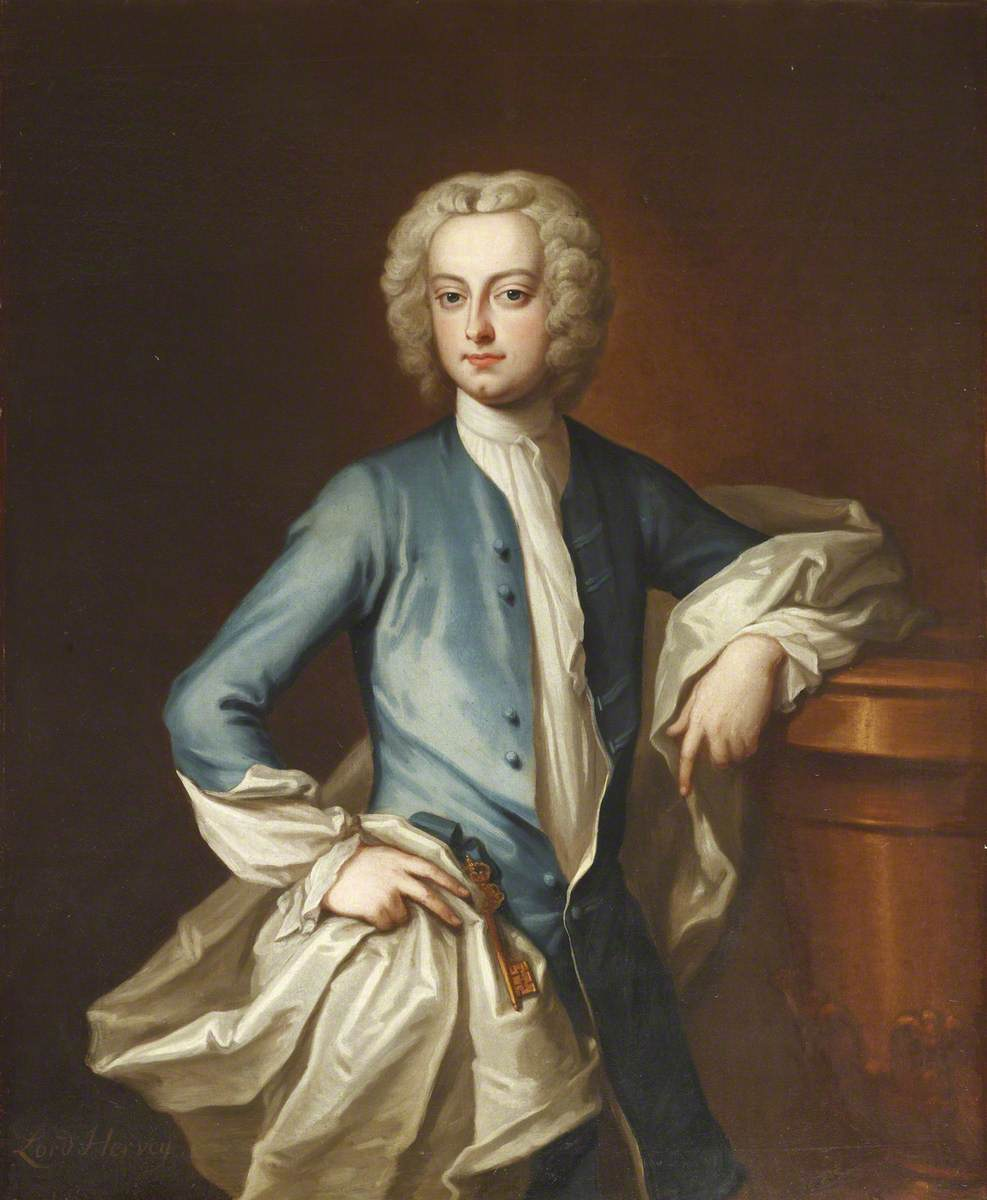
John Hervey

Fox was the lover of the diarist and courtier John Hervey (1696–1743) for about ten years, from 1726 to 1736. Many passionate letters between the two survive. Hervey initially favoured Fox's brother, Henry Fox, but when "charmingly rebuffed" paid infatuated court to Fox. Their relationship ended about the time Fox entered into an arranged marriage.

Marriage and children

In 1735, at the age of 31, Fox agreed to an arranged marriage with the thirteen-year-old Elizabeth Horner, daughter and sole heiress of Thomas Strangways Horner (1688–1741), a landowner and member of parliament, of Mells Manor in Somerset, Sheriff of Somerset in 1711/12, by his wife Susanna Strangways, a daughter of Thomas Strangways (1643–1713), of Melbury House, and eventual sole heiress of her brother Thomas Strangways (d. 1726). In accordance with the terms of his wife's inheritance from her childless brother in 1726, Thomas Horner had adopted for himself and his descendants the surname and arms of Strangways. The marriage was arranged secretly by the bride's mother Susanna Strangways, whose "paramour" was Henry Fox, Stephen's younger brother. Thomas Horner objected strongly to the marriage (which his wife denied him any involvement in arranging), not only because he considered his daughter too young, but also because he opposed the Whig politics of the Fox family. His manor of Mells passed by tail male to his younger brother. In 1758, Stephen Fox also assumed the additional surname and arms of Strangways, in accordance with the terms of his wife's inheritance. By his wife he had the following children:

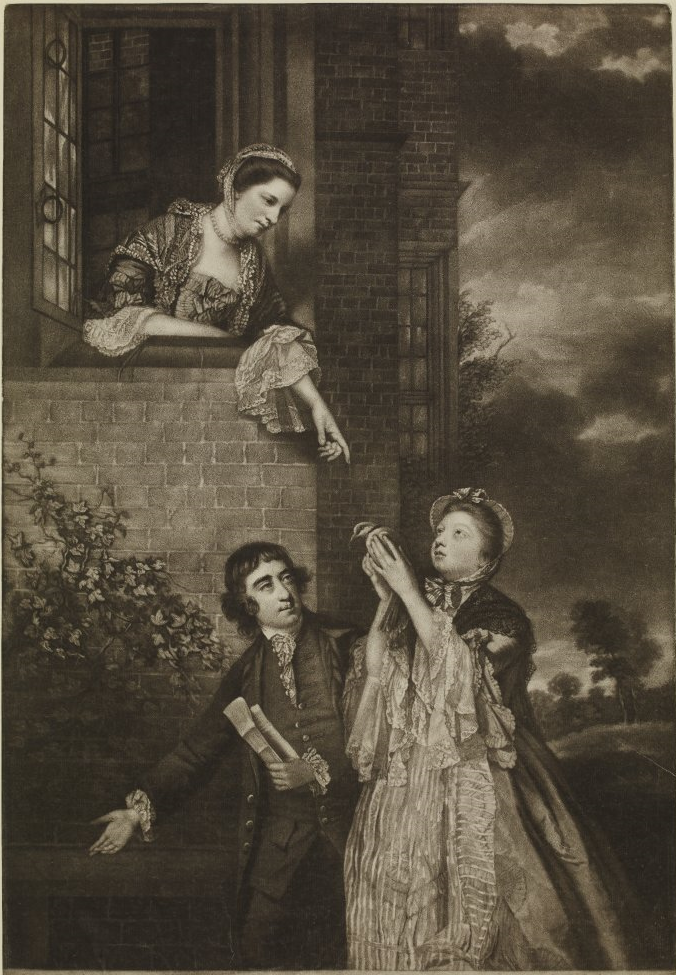
1762 Mezzotint "Ladies Sarah Lennox and Susan Strangeways, with Charles James Fox" at Holland House, Kensington. He stands beside his first cousin Lady Susan Fox-Strangways, holding a pigeon, while his aunt Lady Sarah Lennox (1745–1826) (his mother's youngest sister) leans out of a window above. After original by Sir Joshua Reynolds, British Museum

- Lady Susannah Sarah Louisa Fox-Strangways (1 February 1743 – 1827), known as "Susan". She was the childhood object of affection of her first cousin the future Whig statesman Charles James Fox (1749–1806), who in 1760 when a schoolboy at Eton, composed a prize-winning Latin verse describing a pigeon he found to deliver his love-letters to her "to please both Venus its mistress and him". The scenario was captured in a painting by Sir Joshua Reynolds. The young Charles was however very disappointed when in 1764 she eloped with the "unsuccessful" Irish actor William O'Brien. The match caused a scandal in high society, with Horace Walpole commenting: "Even a footman were preferable — the publicity of the hero's profession perpetuates the mortification".
- Lady Charlotte Elizabeth Fox-Strangways (b. 11 March 1744);
- Lady Juliana Judith Fox-Strangways (b. 10 July 1745);
- Henry Thomas Fox-Strangways, 2nd Earl of Ilchester (29 July 1747 – 5 September 1802);
- Lady Lucy Fox-Strangways (15 December 1748 – 16 August 1787), married Colonel Stephen Digby;

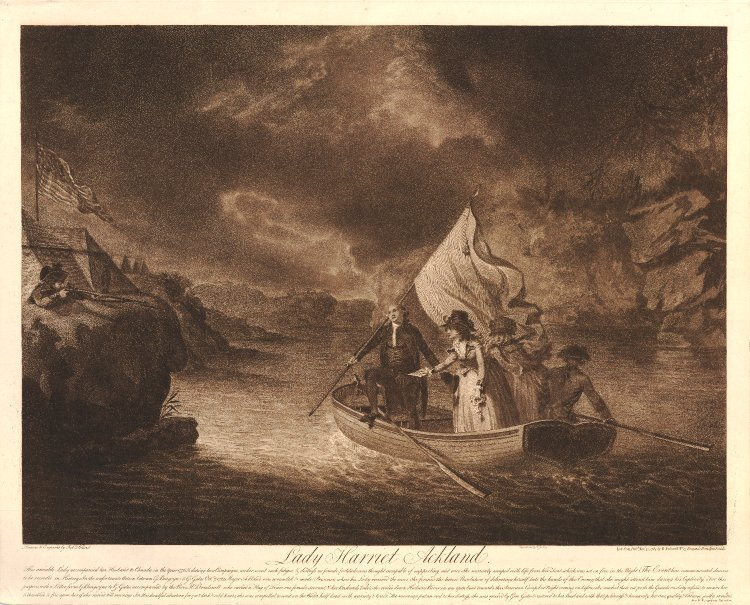
Lady Harriet Acland (née Fox-Strangways) on the Hudson River, drawn & engraved by Robert Pollard, 1784

- Lady Christian Henrietta Carolina Fox-Strangways, called Harriet (3 January 1750 – 21 July 1815), who in 1770 married Colonel John Dyke Acland (1746–1778) of Tetton and Pixton in Somerset, a Tory Member of Parliament for Callington in Cornwall, a major landowner in the West Country who due to his traditional Tory opinions was considered a "provincial boor" by the Fox family's Whig set that gathered at Holland House. She was a heroic figure who accompanied her husband whilst he was fighting in the American War of Independence, and there crossed the Hudson River into enemy lines to nurse him after he was wounded, which scene was later recorded in a painting exhibited in the Royal Academy. Their daughter and only surviving child Kitty Acland married Henry Herbert, 2nd Earl of Carnarvon (1772–1833).
- Lt.-Col. Stephen Strangways Digby Fox-Strangways (3 December 1751 – 12 March 1836);
- Lady Frances Muriel Fox-Strangways (August 1755 – 5 May 1814), who married Valentine Quin, 1st Earl of Dunraven and Mount-Earl;
- Rev. Charles Redlynch Fox-Strangways (27 April 1761 – 4 November 1836), who married Jane Haines;

== Death and burial ==
Fox died in September 1776, aged 72, and was succeeded by his son Henry Thomas Fox-Strangways, 2nd Earl of Ilchester. Fox was buried in the church yard of St. Mary's Chapel on his estate at Melbury Sampford, Dorset.

The parish register for Pitton and Farley in Wiltshire contains a burial record for Stephen Standish Strangways Lord Stavordale dated 31 March 1777. That would be a courtesy title for the Earl or his son or grandson. It is unclear who the buried person actually is.

== Fictitious depictions ==
Stephen Fox appears as "Stephen Reynard", later Lord Ivell and Earl of Wessex, in the short story "The First Countess of Wessex" by Thomas Hardy, collected in A Group of Noble Dames.

== Arms ==
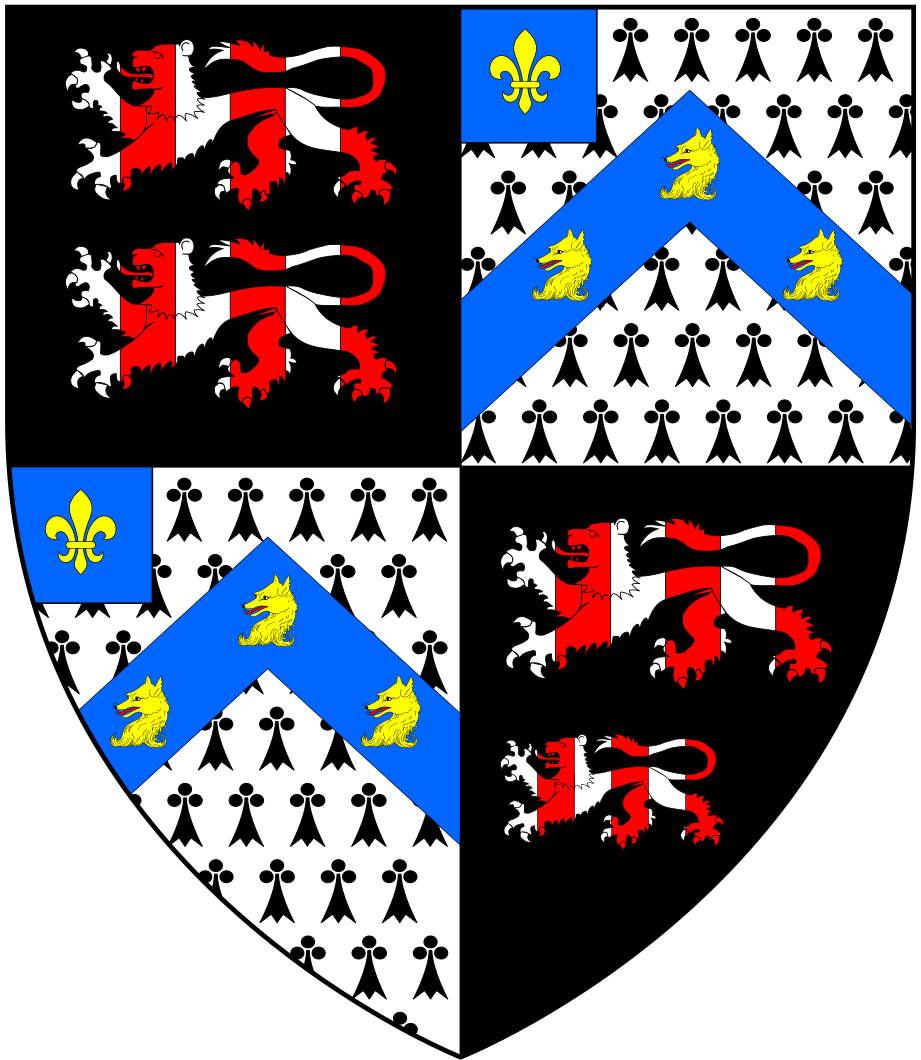
Arms of Fox-Strangways

The arms of the head of the Fox-Strangways family are blazoned Quarterly of four: 1st & 4th: Sable, two lions passant paly of six argent and gules (Strangways); 2nd & 3rd: Ermine, on a chevron azure three foxes' heads and necks erased or on a canton of the second a fleur-de-lys of the third (Fox).

Peerage of Great Britain
New creation	Earl of Ilchester; 1756–1776	Succeeded by Henry Thomas Fox-Strangways
New creation	Baron Ilchester; 1741–1776	Succeeded by Henry Thomas Fox-Strangways
New creation	Baron Ilchester and Stavordale; 1747–1776	Succeeded by Henry Thomas Fox-Strangways
