= John Dyke Acland =

British politician and military officer (1747–1778)

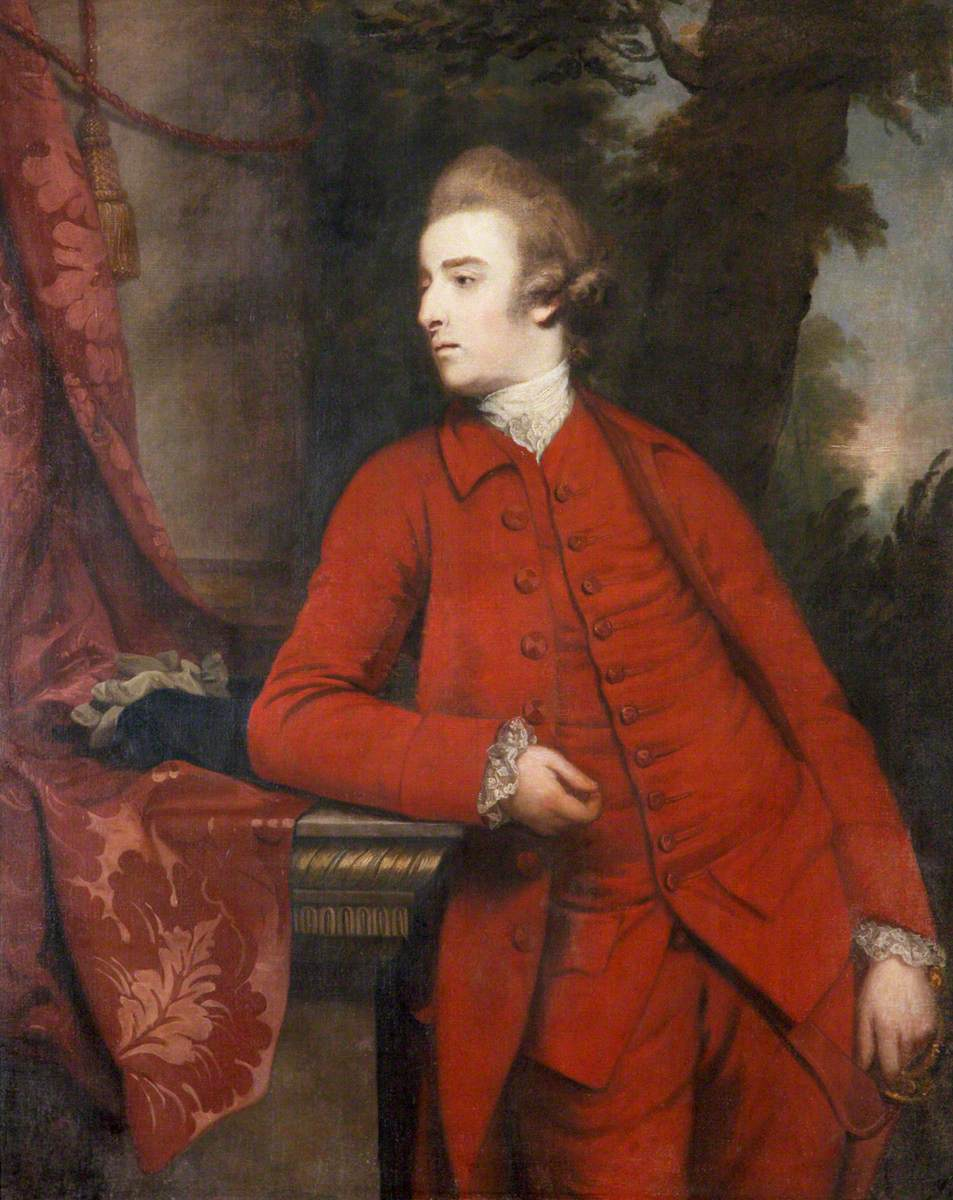
1768 portrait of Acland by Sir Joshua Reynolds

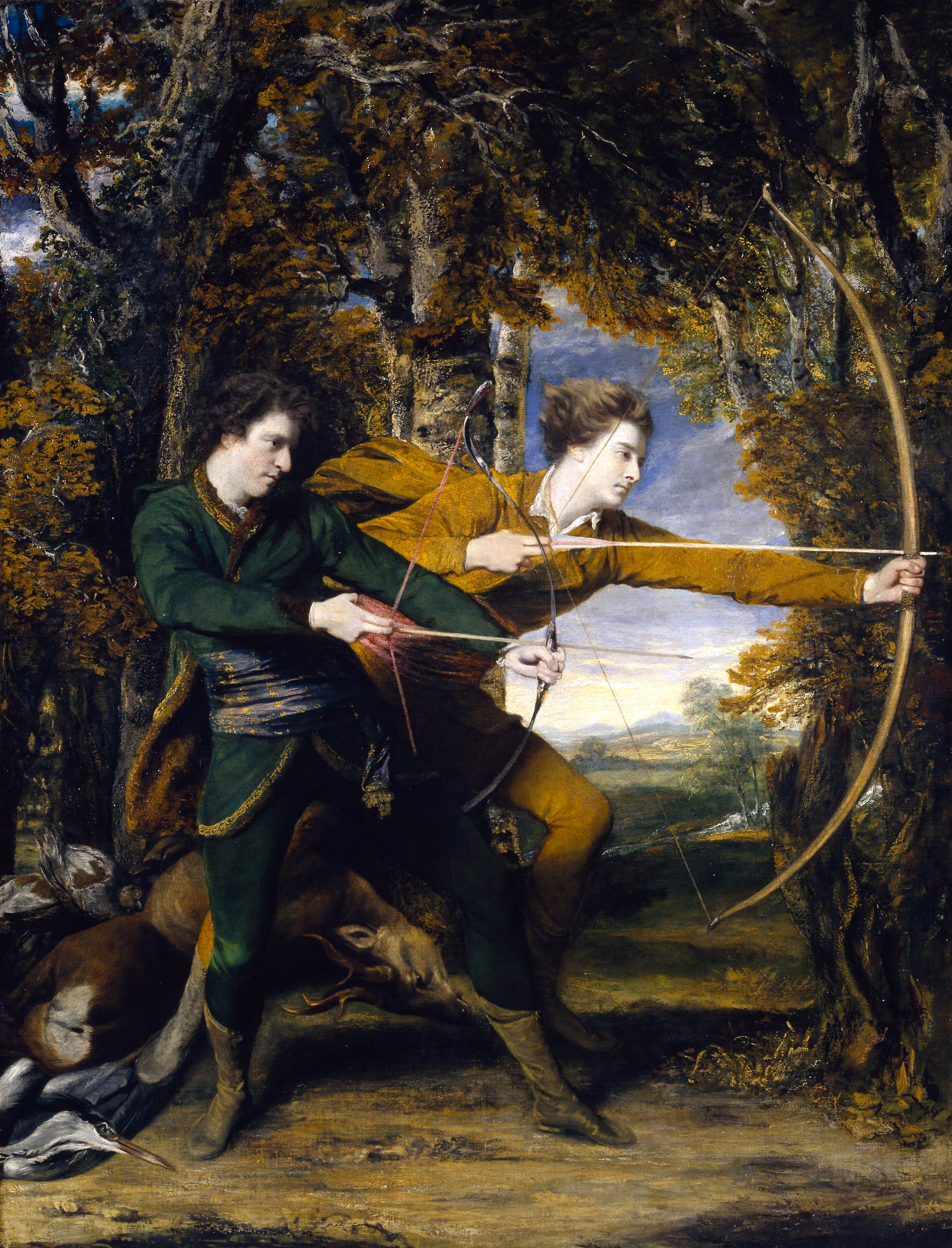
Colonel Acland and Lord Sydney: The Archers; Acland is on the right.

John Dyke Acland (21 February 1747 – 22 November 1778) was a British Tory politician and military officer who represented Callington in the House of Commons of Great Britain from 1774 to 1778. He also served in the American War of Independence.

== Early life ==
He was the eldest son and heir apparent of Sir Thomas Dyke Acland, 7th Baronet (1722–1785) of Killerton in Devon and Petherton Park in Somerset, by his wife Elizabeth Dyke (d.1753), daughter and heiress of Thomas Dyke of Tetton, Holnicote and Pixton in Somerset. The ancient Acland family, believed to be of Flemish origin, originated at the estate of Acland in the parish of Landkey in North Devon, where it is first recorded in 1155.

== Career ==
Acland was colonel of the 1st Devon Militia, formed to protect Great Britain from a feared French invasion. In 1774 he was elected Member of Parliament for the rotten borough of Callington in Cornwall, and forcefully expressed his Tory views in parliament by virulently opposing the movement by the American colonists to obtain independence following their complaint of "No taxation without representation". He poured scorn on those fellow MP's who sought to appease the colonists and called their proposed concessions "nugatory and humiliating" and certain to result in "a total convulsion of the British Empire". His vehemence is said to have alarmed even King George III himself, no friend of the revolutionary colonists. In his capacity as a Colonel of Militia and bypassing parliament, he presented a loyal address to the king in person promising him aid whenever and wherever called upon to put down sedition and in which he portrayed the Whig opposition as rebels to the King's interests, akin to the American colonists. This action of his gained him the enmity of the Whig party. His wife's first cousin was the prominent Whig Charles James Fox, who criticised him savagely in Parliament. While still a member of Parliament he purchased a commission as an officer in the 20th Regiment of Foot. At the State opening of Parliament in October 1775, the King spoke of a "rebellious war" which had been opened by the colonists who had fired shots at Lexington and Concord, and Acland received the privilege of moving the formal vote of thanks to the King's Speech in the House of Commons. This he did in "fulsome and adulatory" terms, which were ill-received by the Whig opposition.

On 8 April 1776 and accompanied by his wife and his pet dog "Jack Ketch", he set sail in the Kent from Cork in Ireland for Canada as a major in the 20th Regiment of Foot, serving under his friend Lieutenant-general John Burgoyne at the head of an army to reinforce the British troops in North America. He was present with Burgoyne during his invasion of northern New York in 1777.

=== Prisoner of war ===
On 7 October 1777 at the Battle of Bemis Heights, near Stillwater, New York he was shot through the legs by American troops and was taken prisoner. His wife, Lady Harriet, was allowed to enter the American camp to nurse her husband and was well-treated by the American soldiers.

Acland was grateful for the treatment received when recuperating as a prisoner of war, so much so that following his return to England he challenged a certain Lieutenant Lloyd to a duel when the latter spoke poorly of Americans at a dinner party. Although he survived the duel, he caught a cold during it from which he died at Pixton Park in 1778.

== Marriage and children ==
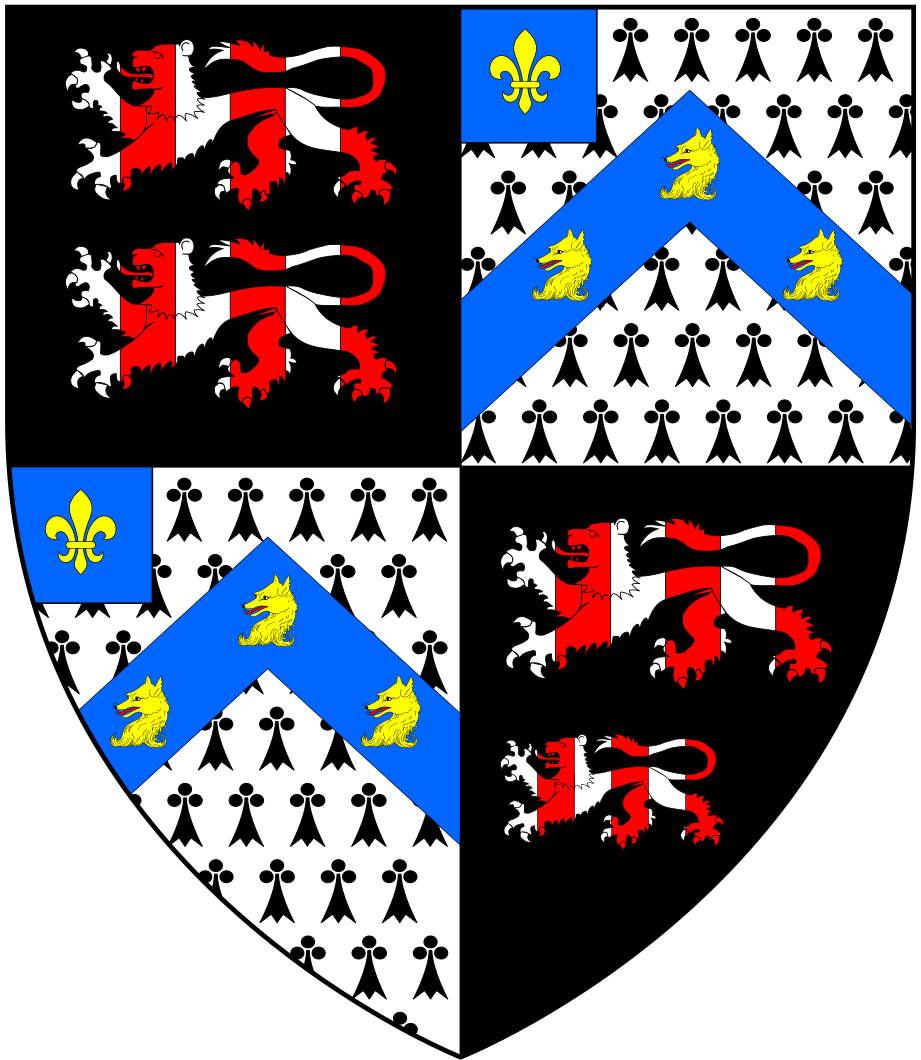
Arms of Fox-Strangways: Quarterly of four: 1st & 4th: Sable, two lions passant paly of six argent and gules (Strangways); 2nd & 3rd: Ermine, on a chevron azure three fox's heads and necks erased or on a canton of the second a fleur-de-lys of the third (Fox)

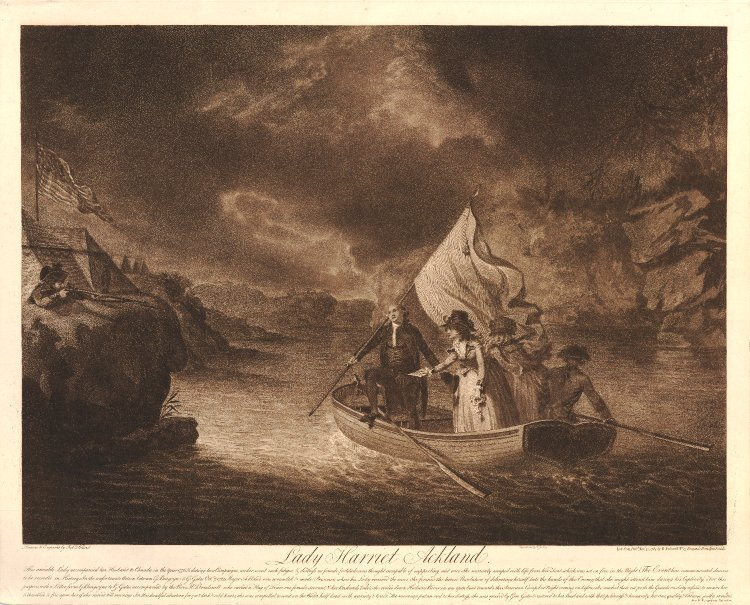
Lady Harriet Acland (née Fox-Strangways) on the Hudson River, drawn & engraved by Robert Pollard, 1784

In 1770 he married Lady Christian Henrietta Caroline Fox-Strangways (d.1815), (known as Harriet) a daughter of Stephen Fox-Strangways, 1st Earl of Ilchester and his wife, the former Elizabeth Horner. Harriet was a first cousin of the leading Whig statesman Charles James Fox, a political opponent of her husband. She accompanied her husband on his military service in Canada, and displayed exceptionally courageous behaviour, for which she later became celebrated. Not only did she insist on following her husband as the campaigning progressed, but insisted on crossing over the Hudson River into enemy territory in order to nurse her prisoner-of-war husband for nine weeks. An oil painting, now at Killerton, was made illustrating her exploit of crossing the Hudson River, and was exhibited at the Royal Academy in London, and was made into a widely published engraving.

Acland and his wife had the following children:

- Sir John Dyke Acland, 8th Baronet (1778–1785), who on 24 February 1785 at the age of 7 inherited the baronetcy on the death of his grandfather the 7th Baronet. He died a few weeks later aged 7, when the baronetcy passed to his uncle Sir Thomas Dyke Acland, 9th Baronet.
- Elizabeth "Kitty" Acland (1772–1813) who in 1796 married Henry George Herbert, 2nd Earl of Carnarvon. On her marriage she received as part of her marriage settlement the Acland estates of Pixton and Tetton in Somerset, which thus passed into the Herbert family.

== Death and succession ==
He died aged 31 on 22 November 1778, and thus predeceased his father. He left an infant son born in 1778, aged only a few months old, who died 7 years later, having inherited the baronetcy from his grandfather, and a daughter Elizabeth "Kitty". His widow Harriet lived on at Pixton until 1796 when it was given to her daughter as part of her marriage settlement, and then at Tetton, until her death in 1815.

== See also ==
- Dyke Acland Baronets

Parliament of Great Britain
Preceded by Thomas Worsley; William Skrine	Member of Parliament for Callington; 1774–1778; With: William Skrine	Succeeded by William Skrine; George Stratton
