= Lady Harriet Acland =

British noblewoman and diarist (1750–1815)

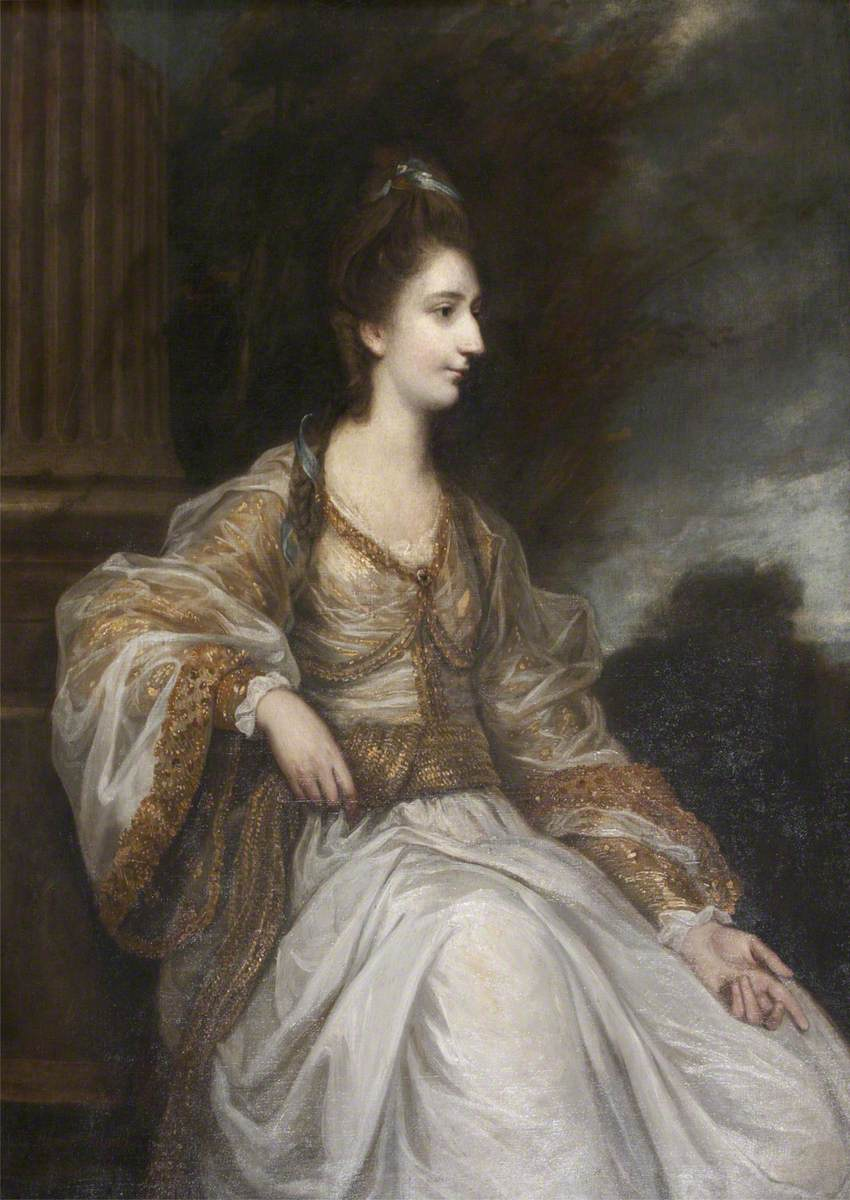
- portrait by Joshua Reynolds
- Born: Hon. Christian Henrietta Caroline Fox-Strangways; 3 January 1750; Kilmington, Somerset, England
- Died: 21 July 1815 (aged 65); Tetton House, Somerset
- Occupations: Noblewoman, diarist
- Spouse: John Dyke Acland (m. 1770; died 1778)
- Children: Kitty Herbert, Countess of Carnarvon; Sir John Dyke Acland, 8th Baronet
- Parents: Stephen Fox-Strangways, 1st Earl of Ilchester; Elizabeth Horner

Lady Christian Henrietta Caroline Acland (née Fox-Strangways; 3 January 1750 – 21 July 1815) was a British noblewoman and diarist. She accompanied her husband to British North America and became celebrated for her personal courage. She is commemorated on one of the bronze reliefs on second floor of the Saratoga Monument in the State of New York.

== Early life ==
She began life as The Honourable Christian Henrietta Caroline "Harriet" Fox-Strangways, daughter of Stephen Fox-Strangways (then Baron Ilchester), and his wife, the former Elizabeth Horner. When her father was raised to his earldom, Harriet added "Lady" to her name as courtesy style. She was born in Kilmington, Somerset and baptized in St James's, Piccadilly, London on 16 January 1750. Her second cousin was the British politician Charles James Fox and her family was part of the Whig aristocratic circle.

== Marriage and issue ==
In 1770, at the age of twenty, she married by special licence John Dyke Acland, son of Sir Thomas Dyke Acland, 7th Baronet and Elizabeth Dyke. Upon their marriage, Sir Thomas gave the couple two Somerset estates, Pixton in Dulverton and Tetton near Taunton. Lady Harriet and her husband had two children:

- Elizabeth "Kitty" Acland (13 December 1772 – 5 March 1813); married Henry Herbert, 2nd Earl of Carnarvon. Kitty would go on to inherit the Pixton and Tetton estates as Harriet and John's only surviving child, thus taking them out of the Acland family upon her marriage.
- Sir John Dyke Acland, 8th Baronet (1778–1785); inherited the baronetcy at the age of 7 on the death of his paternal grandfather, the 7th Baronet. Sir John died a few weeks later, aged 7, and the baronetcy passed to his uncle Sir Thomas Dyke Acland, 9th Baronet.

== American War of Independence ==
During the American War of Independence, Lady Harriet travelled with her husband to the Province of Quebec and the Thirteen Colonies when he commanded the 20th Regiment of Foot. At the time of the Battles of Saratoga, Lady Harriet's husband John was wounded by being shot through both legs and he was captured as a prisoner of war. Lady Harriet—at this point several months pregnant—crossed the Hudson River in a boat, accompanied by her maid, a military chaplain, and John's valet, to join him in captivity and nurse him back to full health. John improved with her careful nursing. The British press, reeling from Britain's defeat in the American War of Independence, lauded her actions as brave and heroic. The next year they returned to England, where Colonel Acland died at Pixton Park, Dulverton near Exmoor on 31 October 1778.

Lady Harriet jointly authored a journal with an anonymous second author (most likely her husband's valet or a military chaplain), which was later published as The Acland Journal. The journal narrated the military expedition as Lady Harriet and her husband's company sailed from Britain and landed in Canada, ending shortly after John was captured. One of the final entries of the journal describes how "the writer of this Journal was sent with a Flag of Truce into the Enemies Camp", describing when Lady Harriet and her party joined John in captivity.

A 1784 engraving by Robert Pollard depicting Lady Harriet Acland on the Hudson River is inscribed as follows:

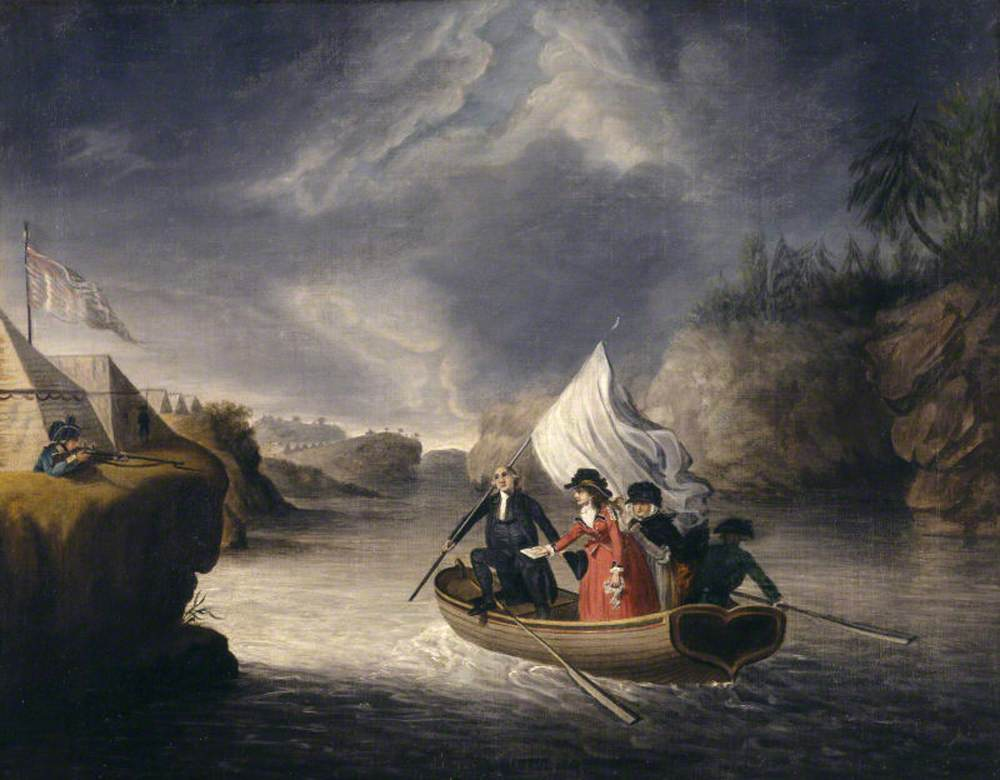
Lady Harriet Acland on the Hudson River, by Robert Pollard, 1784

This amiable Lady accompanied her Husband to Canada in the Year 1776, & during two Campaigns, under went such fatigue & distress as female fortitude was thought incapable of supporting; and once She narrowly escaped with life from her Tent which was set on fire in the Night. The Event here commemorated deserves to be recorded in History. In the unfortunate Action between G. Burgoyne & G. Gates Oct,, 7, 1777, Major Ackland was wounded & made Prisoner, when his Lady received the news She formed the heroic Resolution of delivering herself into the hands of the Enemy that she might attend him during the Captivity For this purpose, with a Letter from G. Burgoyne to G. Gates, accompanied by the Rev. Mr. Brudinell who carried a Flag of Truce, one female servant, & her husbands Valet, she rowed down Hudsons River in an open boat towards the America Camp, but Night coming on before she reached their outposts the Guards on duty refused to receive her & threatened to fire upon her if she moved until morning In this dreadful situation for 7 or 8 dark & cold hours, she was compelled to wait on the Water half dead with anxiety & terror. The morning put an end to her distress, she was receiv'd by Gen. Gates & restored to her husband with that politeness & humanity her sex, quality, & Virtue so justly merited. / See G. Burgoynes Narrative'.

== Widowhood and death ==
During the long period of her widowhood, 1778–1815, Lady Harriet remained at Pixton Park, building the lane now known as Lady Harriet Acland's Drive to connect to where her daughter, Elizabeth, the Countess of Carnarvon, lived near Wiveliscombe.

In 1799, Lady Harriet sold her property Charlton House, at Creech St. Michael, Somerset, to the Coombe family.

Lady Harriet rebuilt Tetton House in Somerset, where she died, aged 65.

== Additional sources ==
- Acland, Lady Harriet. The Acland Journal: Lady Harriet Acland and the American Revolution. Winchester, England: Hampshire County Council, 1993.
- Young Folks Cyclopedia, 1882
- Courtney, William Prideaux (1885). "Acland, Christian Henrietta Caroline" . In Stephen, Leslie (ed.). Dictionary of National Biography. Vol. 01. London: Smith, Elder & Co. pp. 59–60.
- Wilson, J. G.; Fiske, J., eds. (1900). "Acland, Christina Harriet Caroline Fox" . Appletons' Cyclopædia of American Biography. New York: D. Appleton.
- "Acland, Christian Henrietta Caroline". Eleventh edition of the Encyclopædia Britannica. 1: 149. 1911. Wikidata Q84635219.
- Henry Gardiner Adams, ed. (1857). "Acland, Lady Harriet". A Cyclopaedia of Female Biography: 4–5. Wikidata Q115288963.
