= Dolbury =

Iron Age hill fort in Devon, England

Coordinates: 50.794°N 3.464°W

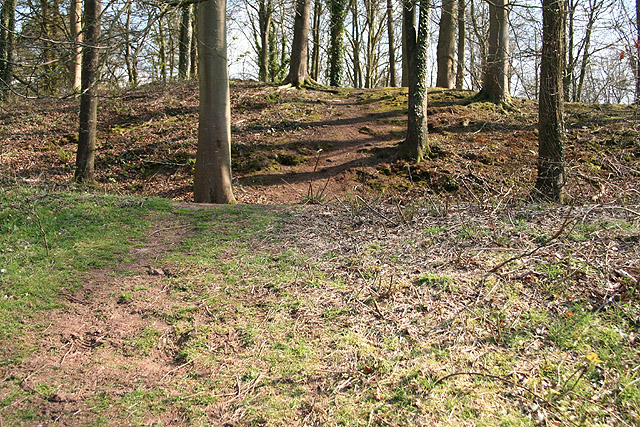
Earthworks at Dolbury

Dolbury is another local name for the Iron Age hill fort or enclosure at Killerton Park in Devon, England. It is referred to as such in several books and websites on Iron Age sites.

The hill fort is situated on a hilltop some 128 metres above sea level; the hilltop has a flat promontory jutting out northwards, still some 100 metres above sea level, around which the River Culm bends. The situation of the hill in the Culm Valley makes it very significant, although that can be hard to appreciate from the views afforded of it from the M5 motorway.

Grid Ref: SS 975 005
