= Pixton Park =

Country house in Somerset, England

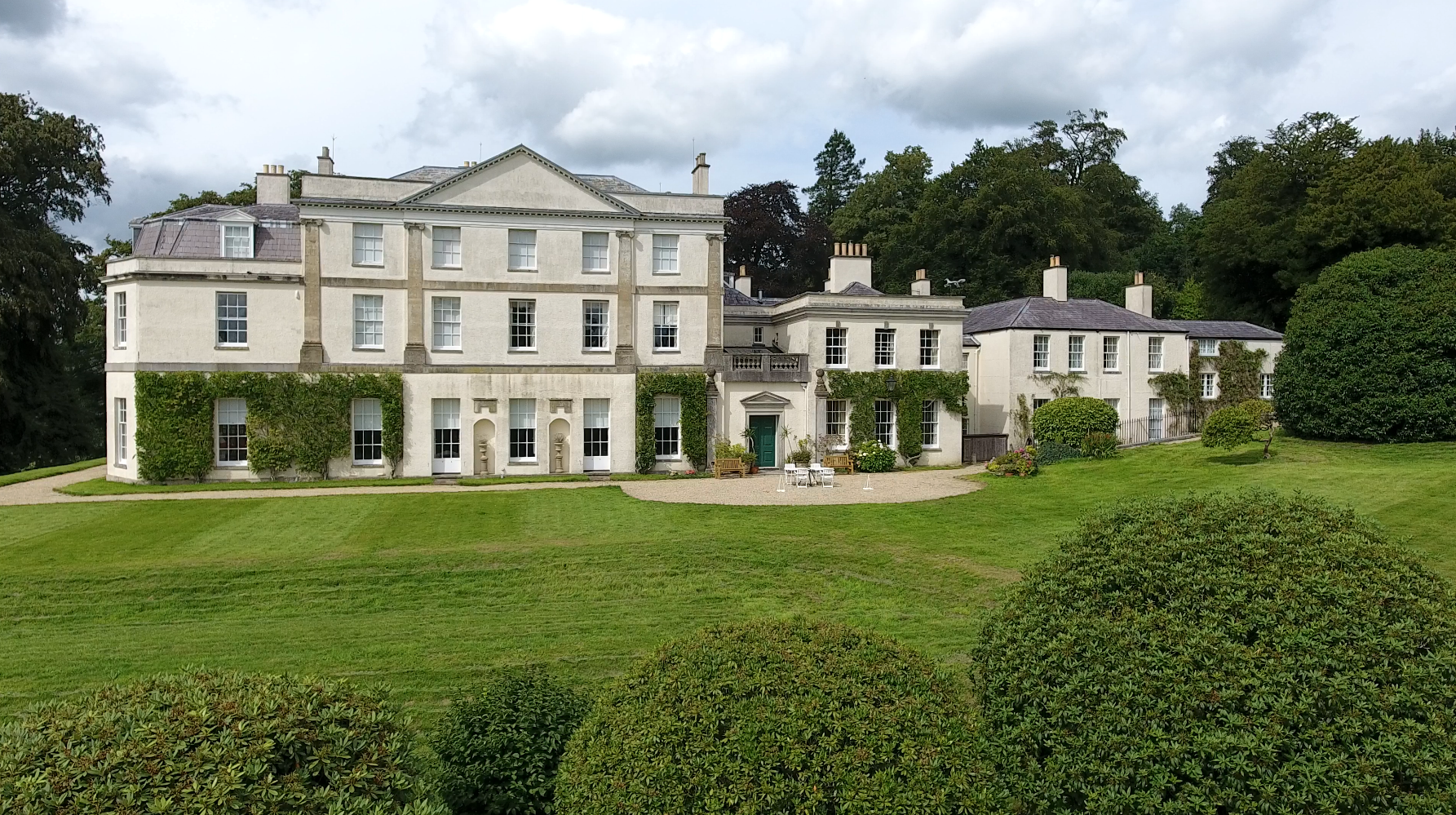
Pixton Park, south front

Pixton Park is a country house in the parish of Dulverton, Somerset, England. It is associated with at least three historically significant families, successively by descent: Acland, amongst the largest landowners in the West Country; Herbert, politicians and diplomats; and Waugh, writers. The present grade II* listed Georgian mansion house was built circa 1760 by the Acland family and in 1870 was altered by Henry Herbert, 4th Earl of Carnarvon (1831–1890). Although Pixton Park is situated within the manor of Dulverton, the manorial chapel relating to Pixton is situated not at Dulverton but within the Church of St Nicholas, Brushford, across the River Barle, as the lordship of the manor of Dulverton was held from 1568 by the Sydenham family seated at Combe House, on the opposite side of the River Barle to Dulverton and Pixton.

== History ==
=== Dyke ===
Arms of Dyke: Or, three cinquefoils sable As visible in the Herbert Chapel, Brushford Church, Somerset

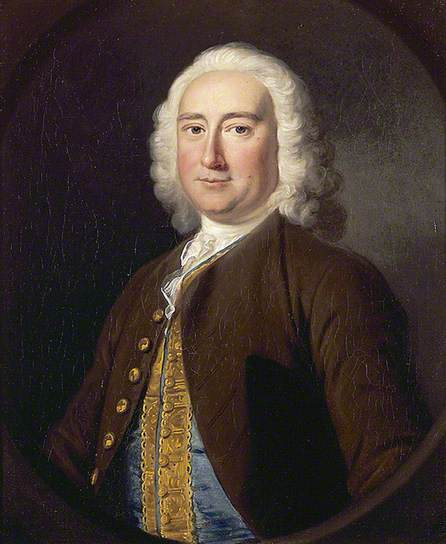
Edward II Dyke (d.1746), portrait circa 1741 attributed to Thomas Hudson (1701–1779), National Trust, Collection of Dunster Castle

Pixton was the seat of the Dyke family.

- John Dyke (d.1699) of Pixton, who died intestate. The will dated 1700 of his wife Margaret (d.1703) survives, which provides a partial pedigree of the family.
- Edward I Dyke (will dated 1728), eldest son and heir, of Pixton. He married Elizabeth Blackford (d.1736), daughter of Richard Blackford of Dunster, a Master in Chancery. In her widowhood she became the heir of her infant relative Henrietta Blackford (d.1733), heiress of Holnicote in Somerset.
- Edward II Dyke (d.1746) of Pixton, eldest son and heir. He was Warden of the royal forest of Exmoor and Master of Staghounds, which pack later became the Devon and Somerset Staghounds, which he kenneled at Holnicote in the north of Exmoor and at Jury and Highercombe, both near Pixton towards the south of Exmoor. He married Margaret Trevelyan, a daughter of Sir John Trevelyan, 2nd Baronet (1670–1755), of Nettlecombe in Somerset, and widow of Alexander Luttrell (1705–1737) of Dunster Castle. Edward inherited Holnicote and estates in Bampton from his brother John Dyke (d.1732), who died without progeny. Edward died without progeny and bequeathed Pixton to his niece Elizabeth Dyke (d.1753), whom he appointed his sole executor, daughter and sole heiress of his brother Thomas Dyke (d.1745) of Tetton. The bequest stipulated that Elizabeth and her husband Sir Thomas Acland, 7th Baronet (1722-1785) should adopt the additional surname of Dyke. Edward Dyke bequeathed his Bampton estates to his nephew Edward Smyth, son of his sister Grace Dyke, on condition he should assume the surname and arms of Dyke. Several portraits of Edward II Dyke exist: two which were at Pixton in 1909 and two at Dunster Castle. Five portraits of his wife Margaret Trevelyan survive, four at Dunster Castle and one at Nettlecombe Court. The archives of Dyke family, including Dyke family wills 1636–1770, are held at Highclere Castle, the residence of their descendants the Herbert family.

=== Acland ===
Arms of Acland: Chequy argent and sable, a fesse gules. As visible in the Herbert Chapel, Brushford Church, Somerset

- Sir Thomas Dyke Acland, 7th Baronet (1722-1785) of Killerton, Devon and Petherton Park in Somerset, who acquired Pixton by his marriage to the heiress Elizabeth Dyke (d.1753). In 1746 he took over mastership of the Staghounds following the death of Edward Dyke.
- Col. John Dyke Acland (1747-1778), eldest son and heir apparent, who predeceased his father. He was a Tory MP and a soldier who fought in the American War of Independence. In 1770 he married Lady Harriet Fox-Strangways (d.1815), a daughter of Stephen Fox-Strangways, 1st Earl of Ilchester (1750-1815), and in the marriage settlement his father gave him the estates of Pixton, Tetton and Petherton Park. He died young at the age of 34. His only son was Sir John Dyke Acland, 8th Baronet (1778–1785), "Little Sir John", who was heir to his grandfather the 7th Baronet, who died in 1785, but having inherited the baronetcy and Killerton, he himself died aged only 7, when that estate and the baronetcy descended to his uncle Sir Thomas Dyke Acland, 9th Baronet (1752–1794), second son of Sir Thomas Dyke Acland, 7th Baronet (1722–1785).
- Elizabeth "Kitty" Acland, only daughter and sister of the 8th Baronet, who in 1796 married Henry George Herbert, 2nd Earl of Carnarvon, then aged 24 and known by his courtesy title of Lord Porchester. Her widowed mother Lady Harriet continued to live at Pixton until her daughter's marriage, when as a marriage settlement she gave her the estates of Pixton and Tetton, and herself moved to Tetton as dowager, where she died in 1815 after a long battle with cancer. Thus Pixton and Tetton passed to the Herbert family.

=== Herbert ===
Arms of Herbert: Per pale azure and gules, three lions rampant argent. As visible in the Herbert Chapel, Brushford Church, Somerset

==== Henry Herbert, 2nd Earl of Carnarvon (1772–1833) ====
Arms of 2nd Earl of Carnarvon, four quarters (Herbert, Talbot, de Vere, Sawyer of Highclere: Azure, a fess chequy sable and or between three sea-pies (proper?)) with inescutcheon of Acland of Pixton quartering Dyke of Pixton, for his wife the heiress Kitty Acland. Brushford Church, Somerset, above the effigy of his great-grandson Hon. Aubrey Herbert (1880–1923), of Pixton Park, Somerset, second son of the 4th Earl

Henry George Herbert, 2nd Earl of Carnarvon (1772–1833), of Highclere Castle in Hampshire, husband of Elizabeth "Kitty" Acland. Before his father's death in 1811 he was known by his courtesy title of Lord Porchester, and is still memorialised by "Porchester's Post", a 15 foot high square oak post which he erected in 1796 (renewed in 2002), high up on Exmoor 7 miles north-west of Pixton Park, to mark the westernmost boundary of his newly inherited Pixton estate. Thus Pixton passed into the Herbert family, a Roman Catholic family of ancient Welsh origins. This family was a junior branch of the Herbert Earls of Pembroke, descended from the 5th son of Thomas Herbert, 8th Earl of Pembroke and 5th Earl of Montgomery (c.1656–1733), and was prominent in the political and intellectual life of Britain throughout the nineteenth century.

==== Henry Herbert, 3rd Earl of Carnarvon (1800–1849) ====
Henry John George Herbert, 3rd Earl of Carnarvon (1800–1849), eldest son and heir, a writer, traveller and politician. He married Henrietta Anna Howard-Molyneux-Howard, eldest daughter of Lord Henry Thomas Howard-Molyneux-Howard, younger brother of Bernard Howard, 12th Duke of Norfolk. The arms of Howard are visible in the Herbert Chapel, Brushford Church.

==== Henry Herbert, 4th Earl of Carnarvon (1831–1890) ====
Henry Howard Molyneux Herbert, 4th Earl of Carnarvon (1831–1890), eldest son and heir, a leading member of the Conservative Party, a cabinet minister and eventually Lord Lieutenant of Ireland. His second wife was his first cousin Elizabeth Catherine Howard (1856–1929), a daughter of his maternal uncle Henry Howard (1802–1875) of Greystoke Castle, near Penrith, Cumberland, a son of Lord Henry Howard-Molyneux-Howard, younger brother of Bernard Howard, 12th Duke of Norfolk.

He redesigned the Pixton estate and in 1870 carried out significant alterations to the house, including the addition of the west wing with a billiard room, the resiting of the entrance to the north front and the addition of the entrance hall with a service wing added on the east side. In 1874 he built Villa Alta Chiara (an Italian rendering of "Highclere", the English seat of the Earldom) at Portofino in Italy.

1874 was also the year of the building of the Carnarvon Arms Hotel on the Pixton estate, to serve the nearby railway station of Dulverton, opened in 1873 and closed in 1966 as part of the Beeching cuts. It was popular with many visiting foxhunters, staghunters and fishermen. In 2004, after difficult trading conditions during the foot and mouth disease crisis, it was sold as 14 apartments by local estate agents Stags. A history of the hotel, titled A Lazy Contentment, was written by the 4th Earl's great-great-granddaughter Sophia Watson, a daughter of satirist Auberon Waugh, born at Pixton, whose father Evelyn Waugh had married a daughter of Hon. Aubrey Herbert of Pixton, a younger son of the 4th Earl. She commented: "It became an institution - nothing has replaced it". When abroad, the correspondent and fishing writer Negley Farson used to dream of the Carnarvon Arms as the epitome of Englishness.

==== George Herbert, 5th Earl of Carnarvon (1866–1923) ====
George Herbert, 5th Earl of Carnarvon (1866–1923), eldest son and heir, the Egyptologist who discovered the tomb of Tutankhamun. He inherited Highclere Castle from his father, and sold Pixton to his step-mother.

==== Elizabeth, Dowager Countess of Carnarvon (1856–1929) ====
Elizabeth, Dowager Countess of Carnarvon (1856–1929), née Howard, widow of the 4th Earl, who in the 1890s purchased the Pixton estate from her step-son the 5th Earl. Her inscribed memorial brass tablet survives in Brushford Church, near Pixton. She gave the Pixton Estate to her eldest son Aubrey Herbert. Her second son Mervyn Herbert (1882-1929) inherited Tetton in 1907 from his uncle Dr. Hon. Alan Herbert, 2nd son of the 3rd Earl. In 1898 the house was leased to the Soames family, who found it very damp.

==== Hon. Aubrey Herbert (1880–1923) ====
Chest tomb and recumbent effigy of Hon. Aubrey Herbert (d.1923) of Pixton, in the Herbert Chapel, Church of St Nicholas, Brushford, Somerset, viewed from the nave. Above are six heraldic shields describing his ancestry and marriage

Arms of Hon. Aubrey Herbert of Pixton, of six quarters with inescutcheon of pretence of Vesey, for his wife Hon. Mary Gertrude Vesey, an heraldic heiress. The last two quarters are Acland and Dyke, of Pixton. Herbert Chapel, Brushford Church, Somerset

Col. Hon. Aubrey Nigel Henry Molyneux Herbert (1880–1923), was the second son of the 4th Earl by his second wife. He was a diplomat, traveller and intelligence officer, associated with Albanian independence and was twice offered the Throne of Albania. He was given Pixton Park by his mother, with 5,000 acres (20 km^{2}). He also inherited Villa Alta Chiara in Portofino. Highclere Castle and other paternal estates were inherited by his elder half-brother George Herbert, 5th Earl of Carnarvon (1866–1923), the famous Egyptologist who discovered the tomb of Tutankhamun. Aubrey married his distant cousin, the Hon. Mary Gertrude Vesey, only child and sole heiress of John Vesey, 4th Viscount de Vesci (1844–1903), eldest son and heir of Thomas Vesey, 3rd Viscount de Vesci (d.1875) by his wife Lady Emma Herbert (1819–1884) youngest daughter of George Herbert, 11th Earl of Pembroke. By his wife he had four children. He died at the age of 43 and his recumbent effigy survives in the Herbert Chapel of Brushford Church, across the River Barle from Pixton. His widow stayed on at Pixton until 1952, and created a Roman Catholic chapel in the former Ironing Room, which she staffed with her own priest Father O'Brien, resident in a cottage by the stables. She opened the chapel for Sunday morning service to the small catholic population of Dulverton and later built the present Catholic Church in Dulverton, from a former stable.

==== Auberon Herbert (1922–1974) ====
Auberon Herbert (1922–1974), son, who died unmarried. In 1937, to Auberon's disapproval, his sister Laura Herbert married (as his second wife) the novelist Evelyn Waugh, whom she had first met as her elder sister's house guest at Portofino. In 1929, Waugh had divorced his first wife Evelyn Gardner, a half-first cousin of Auberon and Laura, and a niece of the 5th Earl. Waugh's son Auberon Waugh was born at Pixton Park in 1939. In the 1930s guests at Pixton "stood and shivered, while dogs sat on chairs and jumped in and out of the always open windows". Waugh satirised mealtime conversation at Pixton, when "(hunting) arrangements were mulled over at great and inconclusive length" in his depiction of Boot Magna in Scoop:

"For over an hour the details of Priscilla's hunt occupied the dining-room. Could she send her horse overnight to a farm near the meet; could she leave the Caldicotes at dawn, pick up her horse at Boot Magna, and ride on; could she borrow Major Watkins's trailer and take her horse to the Caldicotes for the night, then as far as Major Watkins's in the morning and ride on from there; if she got the family car from Aunt Anne and Major Watkins' trailer, would Lady Caldicote lend her a car to take it to Major Watkins's, would Aunt Anne allow the car to stay the night; would she discover it was taken without her permission? They discussed the question exhaustively, from every angle…".

In World War II the estate was used for pre-school child evacuees, an arrangement made by Auberon's sister Bridget Herbert (Mrs Grant), who had returned to live at Pixton with her two small daughters and became billeting officer for the local area, which saved the house from use by servicemen. After Auberon's death in 1974 the estate was split up, "generally going to his nephews".

=== Bell ===
In about 1990 the mansion house Pixton Park, but not most of the surrounding grounds, was purchased by Timothy F. Bell, a retired City of London financier, and his wife Beatrice, who still resided there in 2016.

== Estate ==
The Pixton estate was large, in the late 19th century extending from Hawkridge, Withypool, King's Brompton to Exebridge and up the valley to Oldways End.

=== Porchester's Post ===
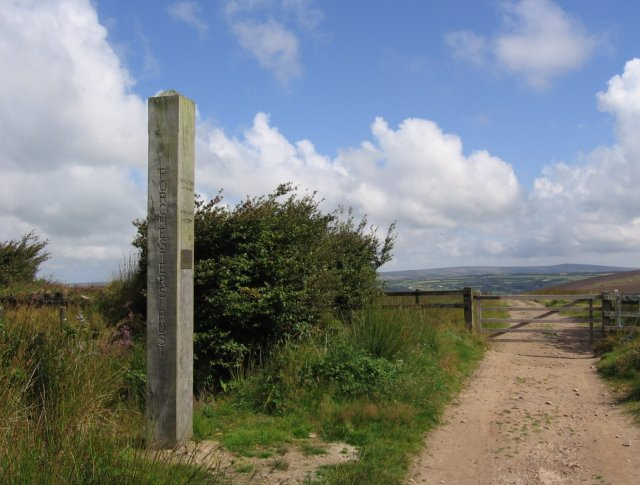
"Porchester's Post", viewed in 2005

The westernmost boundary of the historic estate is marked by "Porchester's Post", a 10 foot high oak obelisk first erected in 1796 for that purpose, by Henry George Herbert, 2nd Earl of Carnarvon (1772-1833), of Highclere Castle in Hampshire, husband of Elizabeth "Kitty" Acland, heiress of Pixton. He was then aged 24 and until his father's death in 1811 was known by his courtesy title of Lord Porchester. It is located high up on Exmoor between Withypool Hill and Halscombe Allotment (grid reference SS 828 334), 7 miles north-west of Pixton Park. It was renewed and re-erected in 2002 by the Exmoor National Park Authority. A brass plaque attached to it is inscribed as follows:

"First erected in 1796 to mark the boundary of the Carnarvon Estate. Re-erected in memory of Lord Porchester, Earl of Carnarvon, the Chairman of the 1977 inquiry into the protection of moorland on Exmoor and to commemorate the Golden Jubilee of Queen Elizabeth II in 2002".

=== Stable block ===
The stables to Pixton Park were built in the mid-18th century and are now a private dwelling. In 2007 the stables were bought by Richard Caring, the owner of Annabel's nightclub and The Ivy restaurant, and subject to a planning application for a "Winter Palace".

=== Pepperpot Castle ===
Pepperpot Castle in Upton, which is also known as Haddon Lodge, was built by Lady Harriet Acland, during the long period of her widowhood, 1778–1815, as a lodge to the drive to connect Pixton Park in Dulverton where her daughter the Countess of Carnarvon lived, with her own estates near Wiveliscombe.

=== South Haddon Cottage ===
South Haddon Cottage, which was built in 1830, formed part of the estate.

=== Gate lodges ===
Two gate lodges were built to the estate. No 1 Jury Lodge and No 2 Jury Lodge In 1870 the Earl of Carnavon resited the entrance to Pixton Park and created a new driveway, more convenient for guests arriving by train from Dulverton railway station, and added a new lodge. Towards Brushford the River Barle is crossed by the New Bridge dating from 1870, which led to Pixton Park,

=== Other ===
At one time the estate had a herd of Sika Deer (Cervus nippon), and was used for pheasant rearing.
