= Elizabeth Fox, Countess of Ilchester =

Arms of Horner: Sable, three talbots passant argent. Statues of talbot hounds appear as decorative features at Mells Manor, and on the sign of the Talbot Inn, Mells

Arms of Strangways: Sable, two lions passant paly of six argent and gules. These arms were adopted by her father in lieu of his paternal arms, following his wife's inheritance

Elizabeth Fox (or Fox-Strangways), Countess of Ilchester (c.1723–1792), née Elizabeth Horner, was the wife of Stephen Fox-Strangways, 1st Earl of Ilchester.

== Life ==
She was the only child and sole heiress of Thomas Horner (1688–1741) (later Strangways-Horner), MP, of Mells Manor, Mells, Somerset. Her mother was the heiress Susannah Strangways, one of the two daughters of Thomas Strangways (1643–1713) of Melbury House in Dorset, a major landowner. The other daughter, Elizabeth Strangways (died 1729), married James Hamilton, 5th Duke of Hamilton, as his second wife, but died childless. Susanna Strangways was the co-heiress of her childless brother Thomas Strangways (died 1726) and, after the death of her sister the Duchess of Hamilton in 1729, sole heiress.

On 15 March 1736, at the age of 13, Elizabeth married Stephen Fox, the 31-year-old future earl. A homosexual, he was for many years the lover of John Hervey, 2nd Baron Hervey, whose letters to him have been published. Hervey was angered by the marriage and broke off his relationship with Fox.

He was raised to the peerage in 1741 and was created an earl on 17 June 1756, making his wife a countess. In 1758, the earl took the additional surname and arms of Strangways in compliance with the terms of his wife's inheritance.

Initially, the earl and countess did not live together because of Elizabeth's youth. Several of their children died in infancy. Those who survived to adulthood were:

- Lady Frances Muriel Fox-Strangways (died 1814), who married Valentine Richard Quin, 1st Earl of Dunraven and Mount-Earl, and had children
- Lady Lucy Fox-Strangways (died 1787), who married Colonel Hon. Stephen Digby, and had children
- Lady Susannah Sarah Louisa Fox-Strangways (1742–1827), who eloped with, and married, William O'Brien
- Henry Thomas Fox-Strangways, 2nd Earl of Ilchester (1747–1802)
- Lady Christian Henrietta Caroline Fox-Strangway (1750–1815), known as Harriet, who married Colonel John Dyke Acland and had children
- Lt.-Col. Hon. Stephen Strangways Digby Fox-Strangways (1751–1836)
- Rev. Hon. Charles Redlynch Fox-Strangways (1761–1836), who married Jane Haines and had children

In the mid-1760s, Elizabeth arranged the construction of a seaside villa with landscaped gardens, near Chesil Beach in Dorset, in imitation of Horace Walpole's Strawberry Hill House; it was called "Strangways", later known as "Abbotsbury Castle". The house was demolished in 1934, but the gardens, expanded and improved by Elizabeth's son Henry, were restored and opened to the public as Abbotsbury Subtropical Gardens.

From her husband's death in 1776, Elizabeth became Dowager Countess of Ilchester.

Elizabeth is supposedly the real person behind the "first Countess of Wessex" in Thomas Hardy's short story of that name, published in 1891.
