= Tetton, Kingston St Mary =

Historic estate in Kingston St Mary in the English county of Somerset

Coordinates: 51.0679°N 3.1318°W

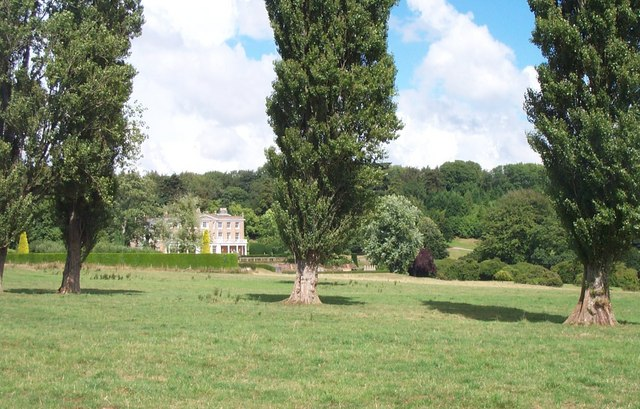
Tetton House

Tetton is an historic estate in the parish of Kingston St Mary in the English county of Somerset. The present grade II* listed Tetton House dates from 1790 and was enlarged and mainly rebuilt in 1924–6 by Hon. Mervyn Herbert (1882–1929) to the design of the architect Harry Stuart Goodhart-Rendel.

== History ==
=== Dyke ===
Arms of Dyke of Somerset: Or, three cinquefoils sable; right: with Dyke crest ''A cubit arm erect, vested and cuffed, the hand grasping a mace, the head of which is barbed with seven spikes. Detail from monumental brass of Thomas Dyke (1613–1689) of Tetton, Kingston St Mary Church. These are also the arms of the Dyke Baronets of Horeham, Sussex

The Dyke family of Somerset uses the same arms as the ancient Dyke family which originated at Dykesfield, Cumberland, before the Norman Conquest of which branches later settled at Henfield in Sussex and at Cranbrook in Kent. Reginald de Dike of Cranbrook was Sheriff of Kent in 1355. Thomas Dyke (d.1632) of Cranbrook married Joan Walsh, heiress of the manor of Horeham in the parish of Waldron in Sussex, which thus passed to the Dykes. The Dyke Baronetcy, of Horeham in the County of Sussex, was created in 1677 for Thomas Dyke, Commissioner of Public Accounts and a Member of Parliament for Sussex and East Grinstead.

Monumental brass of Thomas Dyke (1591–1672) of Tetton, in the Tetton Pew of Kingston St Mary Church

- Thomas Dyke (1591–1672) of Tetton, who married a certain Anna (1598–1630). His monumental brass survives on the wall of the Tetton Pew of Kingston St Mary Church, inscribed as follows:

"Here lye buried the bodyes of Thomas Dyke and Anna his wife. She died 15th day of May 1630 aetatis suae 32. He died 26th day of May anno d(omi)ni 1672 aetatis suae 81".

On a speech scroll emanating from the mouth of a skull above two crossed-bones:

Farewell fond world, I found thee vaine at best,
In Abram's bosome I find sweetest rest.

Also engraved here on a shield are the Dyke arms : Or, three cinquefoils sable; above, on an esquire's helmet, the Dyke crest: A cubit arm erect, vested and cuffed, the hand grasping a mace, the head of which is barbed with seven spikes.

Below is inscribed in Latin:

Siste viator morae pretium erit scire qui vir hic situs est. ("Stand still, O traveller, the prize of your delay shall be to know what man is placed here")

Below is inscribed verse:

"Here lyes just pious prudence which is more,
Here lyes the father of the orphan poore;
King, country, church, the poore, all these have lost,
Good subject, servant, son, those fathermost".

Below is inscribed in Latin:

Abi viator et vale donec resurgamus. ("depart, traveller, and fare thee well, until we rise again")

Monumental brass of Thomas Dyke (1613–1689) of Tetton, in the Tetton Pew of Kingston St Mary Church

- Thomas Dyke (1613–1689), Doctor of Medicine, son, whose monumental brass also survives on the wall of the Tetton Pew of Kingston St Mary Church. He proved his father's will dated 10 March 1671 at the Archdeaconry Court of Taunton on 24 June 1672. He married twice, firstly to Elizabeth Pepys, a daughter of John Pepys (1576–1652) of Ashtead and sister and eventual co-heiress of Edward Pepys. Without progeny. Secondly to Joanna Deane, possibly his servant, by whom he had an illegitimate son called Thomas Deane, of the Inner Temple, who later adopted his father's surname of Dyke, and died without progeny.
- Thomas Dyke (d.1745) of Tetton. He was one of the sons of Edward I Dyke (will dated 1728) of Pixton, Somerset, by his wife Elizabeth Blackford (d.1736), a daughter of Richard Blackford of Dunster, Master in Chancery, and heiress of her cousin Henrietta Blackford (1725–1733), heiress of Holnicote.
- Elizabeth Dyke (d.1753), daughter and sole heiress. She married Sir Thomas Acland, 7th Baronet (1722–1785) of Killerton in Devon and Petherton Park in Somerset. She was also the heiress of her childless uncle Edward II Dyke (d.1746) of Pixton, the husband of Margaret Trevelyan, a daughter of Sir John Trevelyan, 2nd Baronet (1670–1755), of Nettlecombe in Somerset, and widow of Alexander Luttrell (1705–1737) of Dunster Castle. Edward's portrait survives in Dunster Castle. Elizabeth Dyke thus brought to her husband the estates of Tetton, Holnicote and Pixton, "a splendid dowry" worth about £30,000, and extending into 24 parishes. According to the marriage settlement Elizabeth and her husband were obliged to adopt the additional surname of Dyke.

=== Acland ===
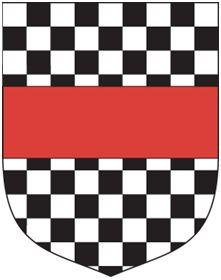
Arms of Acland: Chequy argent and sable, a fesse gules

The Acland family originated in the 12th century at the estate of Acland, from which they took their name, in the parish of Landkey, North Devon. In the opinion of the Devon historian Hoskins (1981), based on the family's early and repeated use of the Flemish firstname of Baldwin, the Acland family probably migrated to England from Flanders soon after the Norman Conquest of 1066. Sir John Acland, 1st Baronet (c. 1591 – 1647) moved his residence from Acland to Columb John, near Exeter, the former seat of his great-uncle Sir John Acland (died 1620), and soon after the family moved again to the adjoining estate of Killerton where they built a grand country house, today the property of the National Trust.

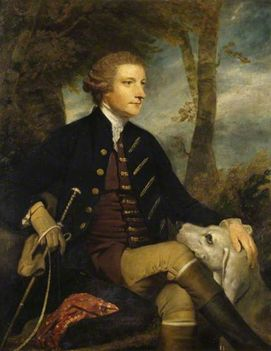
Sir Thomas Dyke Acland, 7th Baronet (1723–1785) painted in 1767 by Sir Joshua Reynolds. Two identical versions exist, both owned by the National Trust, one at Saltram House, the other at Killerton House, both in Devon

- Sir Thomas Dyke Acland, 7th Baronet (1722–1785), who in 1745 married Elizabeth Dyke, the heiress of Holnicote, Pixton and Tetton. He was the eldest son and heir of Sir Hugh Acland, 6th Baronet (1697–1728) of Killerton in Devon, by his wife Cicely Wroth, eldest daughter and eventual sole heiress of Sir Thomas Wroth, 3rd Baronet (1674–1721), MP, of Petherton Park, Somerset. He served as Member of Parliament for Devon, 1746–1747, for Somerset, 1767–1768, and was High Sheriff of Somerset in 1751. He was a prominent member of the Westcountry gentry, and a famous staghunter who used as his hunting seats his wife's Exmoor estates of Pixton and Holnicote. He kept his own pack of hounds, which had formerly been kept by the Dykes. He became forester or ranger of Exmoor under grant from the Crown and "hunted the country in almost princely style. Respected and beloved by all the countryside, he was solicited at the same time to allow himself to be returned as member of Parliament for the counties of Devon and Somerset. He preferred, however, the duties and pleasures of life in the country, where he bore without abuse the grand old name of gentleman".

=== Herbert ===
Arms of Herbert: Per pale azure and gules, three lions rampant argent

- Henry George Herbert, 2nd Earl of Carnarvon (1772–1833), who inherited Tetton and Pixton as part of the marriage settlement on his marriage in 1796 to Elizabeth "Kitty" Acland, daughter of John Dyke Acland (1746–1778) by his wife Lady Harriet Fox-Strangways (1750–1815), a daughter of Stephen Fox-Strangways, 1st Earl of Ilchester (1704–1776). John Dyke Acland was the son and heir apparent of the 7th Baronet by his marriage to Elizabeth Dyke, and was the father of Sir John Dyke Acland, 8th Baronet (d. 1785), who died aged 7. Lady Harriet died at Tetton in 1815.
- Edward Charles Hugh Herbert (1802–1852) of Tetton, MP for Callington, second son of Henry Herbert, 2nd Earl of Carnarvon by his wife Kitty Acland. In 1851 the occupant of Tetton was Thomas Acland, the future 11th Baronet. His whole household was struck down by scarlet fever, probably caused by bad drains and water supply, and his first wife and one of his daughters, 3 year-old Cecily, died there in May 1851, after which the family moved to Holnicote, which then burnt down, then to Sprydon, purchased by his father the 10th Baronet.
- Edward Henry Charles Herbert (1837–1870), only surviving son, of Tetton, was murdered by brigands in Greece.
- Dr. The Hon. Alan Percy Harty Molyneux Howard Herbert (1836–1907), of Tetton, first cousin, second son of the 3rd Earl, a doctor of medicine who was awarded the Legion of Honour by the French government in 1871 for his service as a doctor during the siege of Paris in the Franco-Prussian War, and remained there as the physician in charge of the Hertford Hospital until 1901. He inherited the estate of Tetton from his first cousin Edward Henry Charles Herbert (1837–1870).
- Hon. Mervyn Robert Howard Molyneux Herbert (1882–1929), of Tetton, nephew, third son (second son by second wife) of Henry Herbert, 4th Earl of Carnarvon (1831–1890), of Highclere Castle in Hampshire and of Pixton in Somerset. The eldest son of the 4th Earl, by his first wife, inherited Highclere and the earldom, whilst he bequeathed Pixton to Aubrey Herbert, his eldest son by his second wife. Mervyn Herbert, younger brother of Aubrey Herbert, was a diplomat and cricketer who enlarged and rebuilt Tetton House between 1924 and 1926, to the design of the architect H.S. Goodhart-Rendel. His inscribed brass memorial tablet survives in the Church of the Blessed Virgin Mary, Kingston St Mary. In 1921 he married Mary Elizabeth Willard, a daughter of Joseph E. Willard.
- Edward Alan Mervyn Henry Molyneux Herbert (1926–1994), son. Captain, Coldstream Guards, a lawyer at the Middle Temple and an Associate of the Royal institute of British Architects. In 1966 he married Bridget Anne Hibbert (d.1976), daughter of Major Hugh Washington Hibbert. In 1994 the Tetton estate comprised 2,000 acres, but had originally been only 700.
- Alan Mervyn Edward Hugh Herbert (born 1971), son, residing at Tetton House in 2015.

In the late 19th century the gate piers and walls from Tetton were moved to Cothelstone Manor. In World War II the house was used as a maternity unit. It has since been divided into apartments.

The south front has a colonnade, of fluted Doric columns, onto a courtyard around which the house is built. The east front has a pedimented porch.

== Bibliography ==
- Lauder, Rosemary (2002). Devon Families. Halsgrove. ISBN 978-1841141404.
- Vivian, John Lambrick (1895). The Visitations of the County of Devon: Comprising the Herald's Visitations of 1531, 1564, & 1620. H. S. Eland.
