= Sir Thomas Dyke Acland, 7th Baronet =

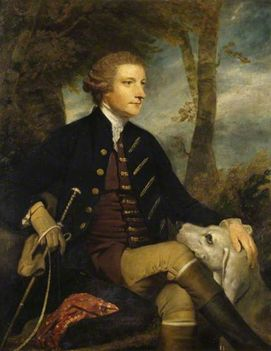
Sir Thomas Dyke Acland, 7th Baronet (1723–1785), with one of his favorite staghounds, painted in 1767 by Sir Joshua Reynolds, two identical versions of which exist both in the collection of the National Trust, at Killerton House and Saltram House, Devon

Arms of Acland: Chequy argent and sable, a fesse gules

Sir Thomas Dyke Acland, 7th Baronet (14 August 1722 – 24 February 1785) of Killerton in Devon and Petherton Park in Somerset, was Member of Parliament for Devon, 1746–1747, for Somerset, 1767–1768, and was High Sheriff of Somerset in 1751. He was a prominent member of the West Country gentry, and a famous staghunter who used as his hunting seats his wife's Exmoor estates of Pixton and Holnicote.

== Origins ==
He was the eldest son and heir of Sir Hugh Acland, 6th Baronet (1697–1728) of Killerton in Devon, by his wife Cicely Wroth, eldest daughter and eventual sole heiress of Sir Thomas Wroth, 3rd Baronet (1674–1721), MP, of Petherton Park, Somerset. He succeeded his father as 7th Baronet on the latter's death on 29 July 1728. The ancient Acland family, believed to be of Flemish origin, originated at the estate of Acland in the parish of Landkey in North Devon, where it is first recorded in 1155.

== Career ==
He was Member of Parliament for Devon, 1746–1747, Member of Parliament for Somerset, 1767–1768, and High Sheriff of Somerset for the year 1751.

== Marriage and progeny ==
On 7 January 1745 he married Elizabeth Dyke (d.1753), daughter and heiress of Thomas Dyke of Tetton, Holnicote, and Pixton in Somerset. Thomas Dyke was a prominent Westcountry staghunter, and kept his own pack of hounds, the earliest recorded precursor of the present Devon and Somerset Staghounds, whose vast hunting terrain covered most of North Devon and Exmoor and the Quantocks in Somerset. His passion for the sport and his pack of hounds were inherited by his son-in-law. By his wife Thomas had two sons:

- Colonel John Dyke Acland (1747–1778), eldest son and heir apparent, who predeceased his father. He was Tory Member of Parliament for Callington in Cornwall and fought in the American War of Independence in 1776. He married Lady Harriet Fox-Strangways (1750–1815), daughter of Stephen Fox-Strangways, 1st Earl of Ilchester. They had a son, Sir John Dyke Acland, 8th Baronet (1778–1785), who on 24 February 1785, at the age of 7, inherited the baronetcy on the death of his grandfather, the 7th Baronet. Sir John died a few weeks later, aged 7, and the baronetcy passed to his uncle Sir Thomas Dyke Acland, 9th Baronet.
- Sir Thomas Dyke Acland, 9th Baronet (1752–1794), second son, who in 1785 succeeded his 7-year-old nephew, Sir John Dyke Acland, 8th Baronet (1778–1785), in the baronetcy.

== Death and succession ==
On his death in 1785 he was succeeded in the baronetcy by his grandson Sir John Dyke Acland, 8th Baronet (d.1785) son of his eldest son.

Parliament of Great Britain
Preceded by Theophilus Fortescue; Sir William Courtenay	Member of Parliament for Devon; 1746–1747; With: Sir William Courtenay	Succeeded by Sir William Courtenay; Sir Richard Bampfylde
Parliament of Great Britain
Preceded by Sir Charles Kemys-Tynte; Thomas Prowse	Member of Parliament for Somerset; 1767–1768; With: Sir Charles Kemys-Tynte	Succeeded by Sir Charles Kemys-Tynte; Richard Hippisley Coxe
Honorary titles
Preceded by Henry William Portman	High Sheriff of Somerset; 1751	Succeeded by John Harding
Baronetage of England
Preceded by Hugh Acland	Baronet (of Columb John); 1728–1785	Succeeded by John Dyke Acland
