= Kitty Herbert, Countess of Carnarvon =

English noblewoman (1772-1813)

The Right Honourable The Countess of Carnarvon
- Born: 13 December 1772; Devon, England
- Died: 5 March 1813 (aged 40); Shooter's Hill, London, England
- Spouse: Henry Herbert, 2nd Earl of Carnarvon (m. 1796)
- Children: 5
- Parents: John Dyke Acland (father); Lady Harriet Fox-Strangways (mother)
- Relatives: Sir John Dyke Acland (brother); Sir Thomas Dyke Acland (uncle); Henry John George Herbert, 3rd Earl of Carnarvon (son)

Elizabeth "Kitty" Herbert, Countess of Carnarvon (13 December 1772 – 5 March 1813), formerly Kitty Acland, was an English noblewoman. She was the wife of Henry Herbert, 2nd Earl of Carnarvon.

== Early life ==
Kitty was the only daughter of Colonel John Dyke Acland and his wife, the former Lady Harriet Fox-Strangways. The Acland family were a landowning gentry family in Devon that traced their lineage back to the twelfth century, and were holders of a baronetcy. Kitty's father was heir to the baronetcy but died when she was six years old in 1778, after catching a chill following fighting in a duel (it was wrongly reported in several places that he died by being wounded in the duel itself or that he died while fighting for the Crown in the American War of Independence). Kitty's brother was Sir John Dyke Acland, 8th Baronet (1778-1785), who inherited the Acland baronetcy from their grandfather in 1785. After he died, the baronetcy passed to his and Kitty's uncle, their father's brother, Sir Thomas Dyke Acland, 9th baronet (1752-1794).

== Marriage and children ==
Kitty and Henry's marriage took place on 26 April 1796, when the future earl was known as Lord Porchester, at St George's, Hanover Square, London. Kitty's marriage settlement included the Acland estates of Pixton and Tetton in Somerset, which passed into the Herbert family. Her husband inherited the earldom in 1811, and she became a countess.

Their children included:

- Henrietta Elizabeth (1797-1836)
- Lady Emily Frances Theresa Herbert (1798-1854), who married Philip Bouverie-Pusey, and had children.
- Henry John George Herbert, 3rd Earl of Carnarvon (1800-1849)
- Hon. Edward Charles Hugh Herbert (1802-1852), who married Elizabeth Sweet-Escott, and had children
- Lady Theresa Elizabeth Mary Herbert (born 1803)

Kitty was preparing to go to Ramsgate for her health when she died at Shooter's Hill in 1813. A death notice stated that "Hundreds whom her boundless charities and ever active benevolence have rescued from poverty and distress will shed tears of grateful sorrow..." Her husband lived until 1833 and died at his London home in Grosvenor Square and was buried at Burghclere. He was succeeded by their eldest son Henry.
