= Henry Herbert, 2nd Earl of Carnarvon =

British military officer and politician (1772-1833)

The Right Honourable The Earl of Carnarvon FSA
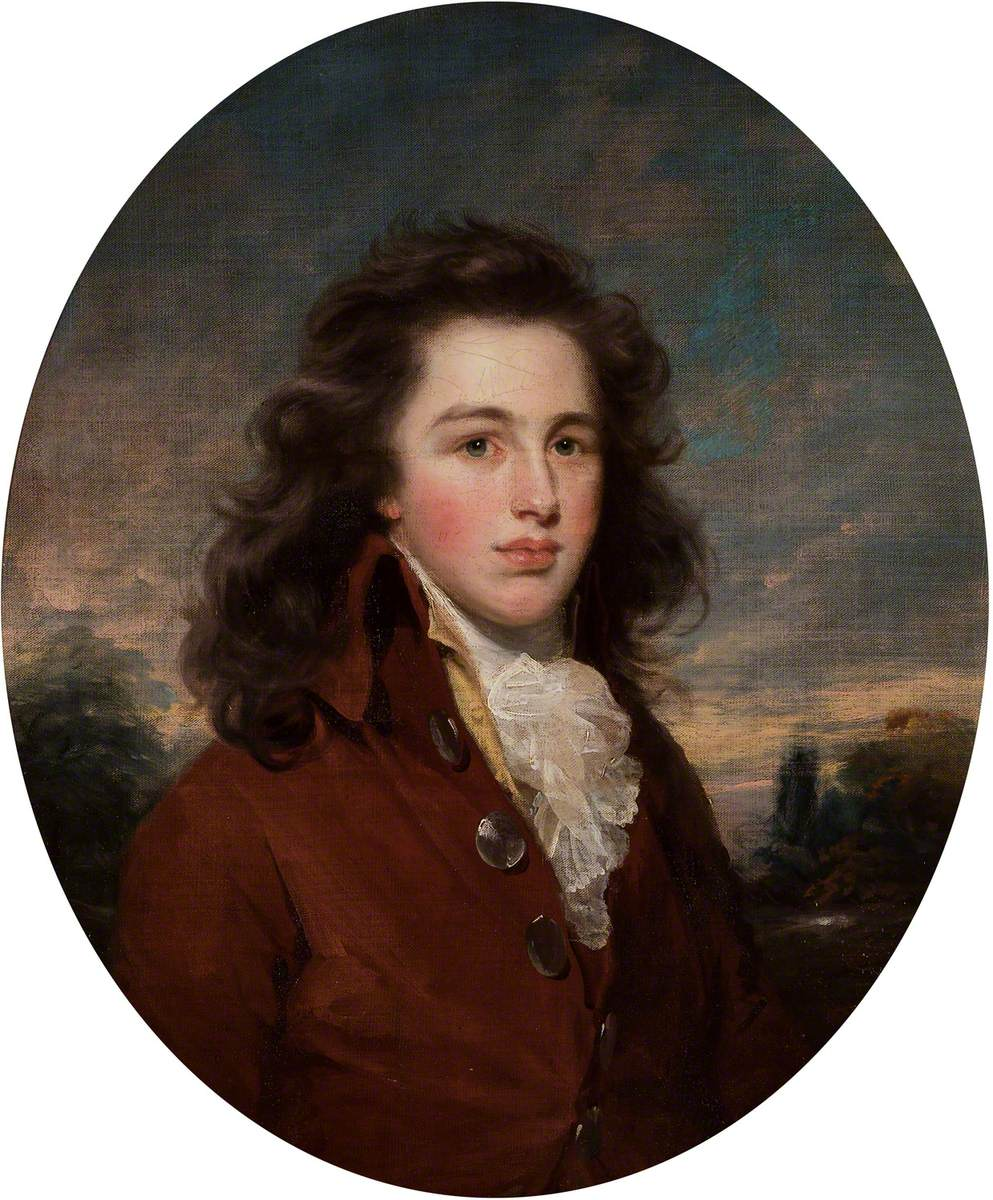
- The Earl of Carnarvon

Member of Parliament for Cricklade
- In office 1794–1801 Serving with Thomas Estcourt
- Preceded by: Thomas Estcourt; John Walker-Heneage
- Succeeded by: Parliament of the United Kingdom

Member of Parliament for Cricklade
- In office 1801–1811 Serving with Thomas Estcourt (1801–1806); Thomas Goddard (1806–1811)
- Preceded by: Parliament of Great Britain
- Succeeded by: William Herbert; Thomas Goddard

Personal details
- Born: 3 June 1772 Hill Street, London, England
- Died: 16 April 1833 (aged 60) Grosvenor Square, London, England
- Resting place: Burghclere, Hampshire, England
- Education: Eton College
- Political party: Whig
- Spouse: Elizabeth "Kitty" Acland (m. 1796; died 1813)
- Children: 5
- Parents: Henry Herbert, 1st Earl of Carnarvon (father); Lady Elizabeth Alicia Maria Wyndham (mother)
- Relatives: Charles Herbert (brother); William Herbert (brother Algernon Herbert (brother); Henry Herbert (son)

Colonel Henry George Herbert, 2nd Earl of Carnarvon, FSA (3 June 1772 – 16 April 1833), styled The Honourable Henry Herbert from 1780 to 1793 and Lord Porchester from 1793 to 1811, was a British military officer and Whig politician.

== Background and education ==
Born in Hill Street in London, Herbert was the oldest son of Henry Herbert, 1st Earl of Carnarvon, and Lady Elizabeth Alicia Maria Wyndham, the oldest daughter of Charles Wyndham, 2nd Earl of Egremont. He was baptised in St George's, Hanover Square on 22 June 1772. His younger brothers were the sailor Charles Herbert and the botanist William Herbert. Another brother, Algernon Herbert was an antiquary. Herbert was educated at Eton until 1789.

== Career ==
Herbert joined the Royal Wiltshire Militia as captain in 1790 and when the West Somerset Yeomanry was raised in 1794 became its major. He was promoted to lieutenant-colonel four years later and obtained colonelcy of the regiment in 1803. Having been elected for Cricklade, Herbert entered the British House of Commons in 1794. After the Act of Union 1801 he represented the constituency then in the Parliament of the United Kingdom until 1811, when he succeeded his father as earl. During his time as Member of Parliament he stirred an investigation into the failure of the Walcheren Campaign in 1809. Herbert was nominated a Deputy Lieutenant for the county of Somerset in 1803 and served as High Steward of Newbury. He was chosen a fellow of the Society of Antiquaries of London in 1814 and was vice-president of the Royal Horticultural Society.

== Marriage and children ==
Arms of 2nd Earl of Carnarvon, four-quarters (Herbert, Talbot, de Vere, Sawyer of Highclere: Azure, a fess chequy sable and or between three sea-pies (proper?)) with inescutcheon of Acland of Pixton quartering Dyke of Pixton. Brushford Church, Somerset, above the effigy of his great-grandson Hon. Aubrey Herbert (1880–1923), of Pixton Park, Somerset, second son of the 4th Earl

On 26 April 1796, he married the heiress Elizabeth "Kitty" Acland (d.1813), at St George's Hanover Square. She was the only daughter and eventual heiress of Col. John Dyke Acland (1747–1778), son and heir apparent of Sir Thomas Dyke Acland, 7th Baronet (1722–1785) of Killerton, Devon, and Petherton Park in Somerset, who acquired Pixton Park, Tetton, Kingston St Mary, and Holnicote, Setworthy by his marriage to the heiress Elizabeth Dyke (d.1753). Her brother was Sir John Dyke Acland, 8th Baronet, who died aged 7. Carnarvon inherited from his wife the substantial Somerset estates of Pixton and Tetton. Kitty died at Shooter's Hill in 1813; Herbert survived her for twenty years until 1833. By his wife he had five children, three daughters and two sons.

- Lady Harriet Elizabeth Herbert (b. 1797), who married Rev. J. C. Stapylton.
- Henry John George Herbert, 3rd Earl of Carnarvon (1800–1849), who married Henrietta Anna Howard-Molyneux-Howard, eldest daughter of Lord Henry Howard-Molyneux-Howard
- Hon. Edward Charles Hugh Herbert (1802–1852), who married Elizabeth Sweet-Escott, daughter of Prebendary Thomas Sweet-Escott. They had two sons.
- Lady Theresa Elizabeth Mary Herbert (1803–1815)
- Lady Emily Frances Theresa Herbert (d. 1854), who married Philip Bouverie-Pusey, paternal grandson of Jacob des Bouverie, 1st Viscount Folkestone and maternal grandson of Robert Sherard, 4th Earl of Harborough. They had one son, and two daughters.

== Death and burial ==
He died, aged 60, at his London residence in Grosvenor Square and was buried at Burghclere in Hampshire. He was succeeded in his titles by his eldest son, Henry.

== Porchester's Post ==
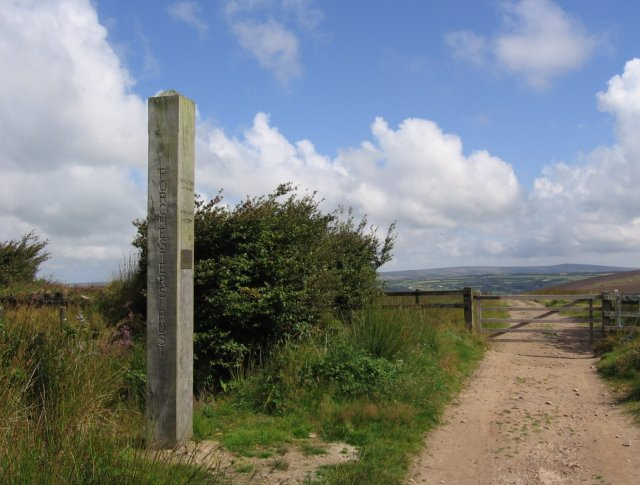
"Porchester's Post", Exmoor, Somerset, viewed in 2005, erected by the 2nd Earl of Carnarvon in 1796, the year of his marriage

The westernmost boundary of the historic estate of Pixton Park in Somerset is marked by "Porchester's Post", a 10-foot high oak obelisk first erected in 1796 for that purpose, by the 2nd Earl of Carnarvon, of Highclere Castle in Hampshire, husband of Elizabeth "Kitty" Acland, heiress of Pixton, whom he had married that year. He was then aged 24 and until his father's death in 1811 was known by his courtesy title of Lord Porchester. It is located high up on Exmoor between Withypool Hill and Halscombe Allotment (grid reference SS 828 334), 7 miles (11 km) north-west of Pixton Park. It was renewed and re-erected in 2002 by the Exmoor National Park Authority. A brass plaque attached to it is inscribed as follows:

"First erected in 1796 to mark the boundary of the Carnarvon Estate. Re-erected in memory of Lord Porchester, Earl of Carnarvon, the Chairman of the 1977 inquiry into the protection of moorland on Exmoor and to commemorate the Golden Jubilee of Queen Elizabeth II in 2002".

== Notes ==
Parliament of Great Britain
Preceded by Thomas Estcourt; John Walker-Heneage	Member of Parliament for Cricklade; 1794–1801; With: Thomas Estcourt	Succeeded by Parliament of the United Kingdom
Parliament of the United Kingdom
Preceded by Parliament of Great Britain	Member of Parliament for Cricklade; 1801–1811; With: Thomas Estcourt 1801–1806; Thomas Goddard 1806–1811	Succeeded by William Herbert; Thomas Goddard
Peerage of Great Britain
Preceded by Henry Herbert	Earl of Carnarvon; 1811–1833	Succeeded by Henry Herbert
