= Killerton =

House in Broadclyst, Exeter, Devon, England

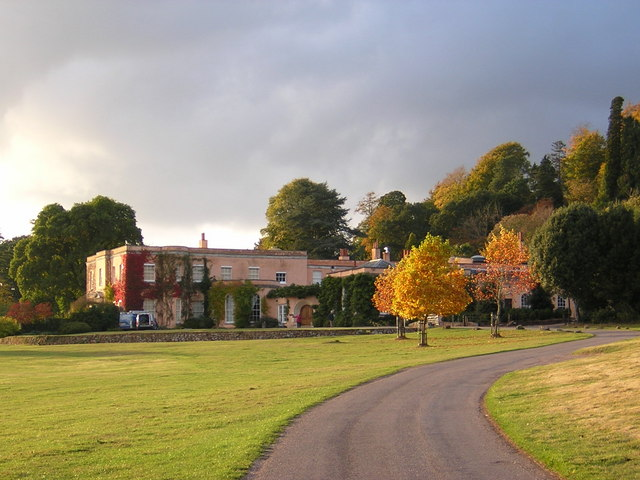
- Killerton House

- Location within Devon
- 50.7915°N 3.4578°W
- Type: Country House
- Location: Broadclyst
- OS grid reference: SS 97349 00089

History
- Built: 1778

Site notes
- Area: Devon
- Architect: John Johnson
- Owner: National Trust

Listed Building – Grade II*
- Official name: Killerton House and Ha Ha approximately 20 metres in front of entrance
- Designated: 11 November 1952
- Reference no.: 1098331

Listed Building – Grade II*
- Official name: The Bear's Hut 220 metres North West of Killerton House
- Designated: 20 May 1985
- Reference no.: 1170706

National Register of Historic Parks and Gardens
- Official name: Killerton House
- Designated: 12 Aug 1987
- Reference no.: 1000694

Killerton is an 18th-century house in Broadclyst, Exeter, Devon, England, which, with its hillside garden and estate, has been owned by the National Trust since 1944 and is open to the public. The National Trust displays the house as a comfortable home. On display in the house is a collection of 18th- to 20th-century costumes, originally known as the Paulise de Bush collection, shown in period rooms.

The estate covers some 2,590 hectares (25.9 km^{2}, 6,400 acres). Included in the estate is a steep wooded hillside with the remains of an Iron Age hill fort on top of it, known as Dolbury, which has also yielded evidence of Roman occupation, namely a triple-ditched Roman fort or marching camp which is still visible in aerial photographs, despite heavy ploughing within the hill fort.

Killerton House itself and the Bear's Hut summerhouse in the grounds are Grade II* listed buildings. The gardens are Grade II* listed in the National Register of Historic Parks and Gardens.

== History ==
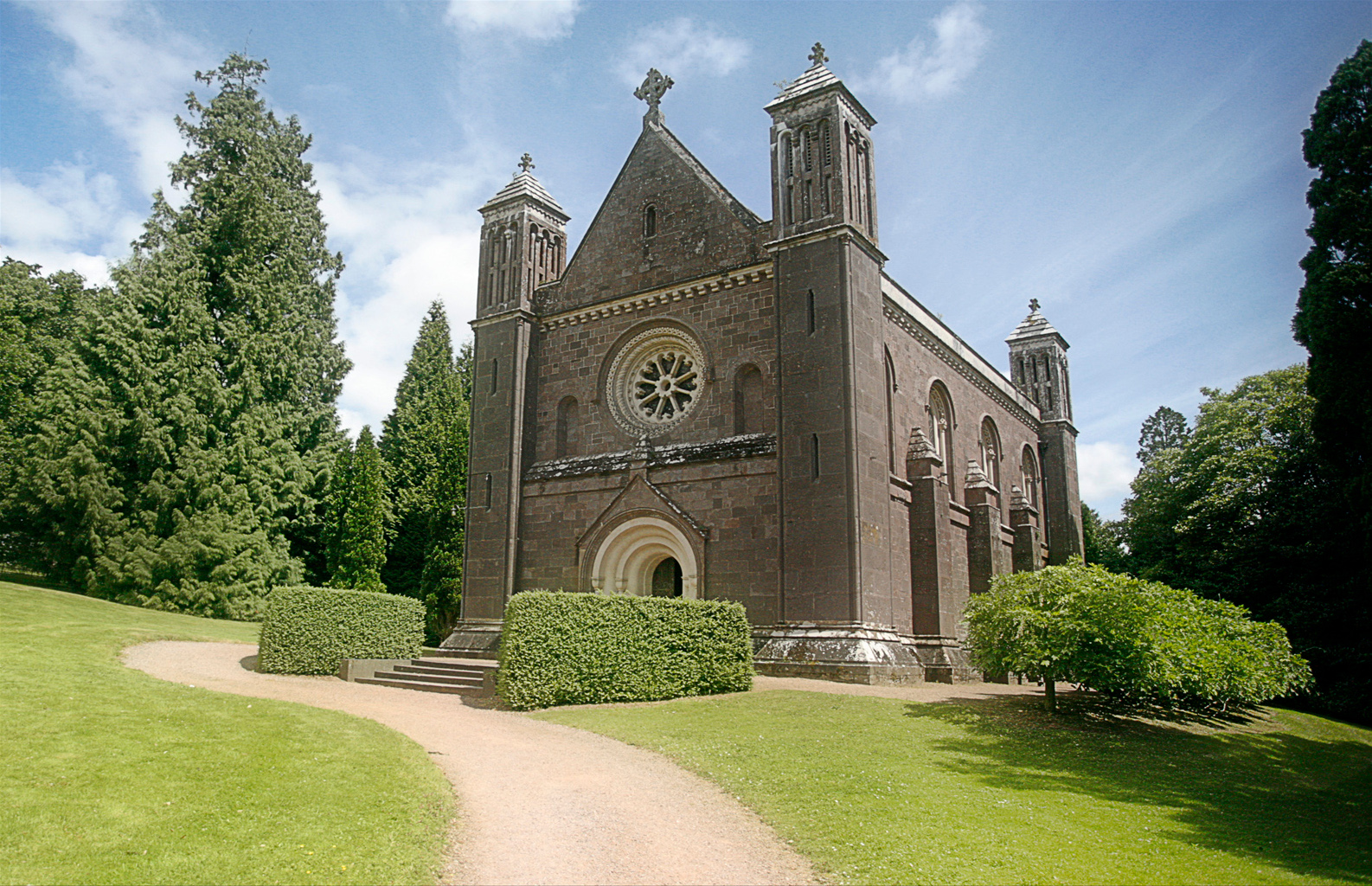
Killerton Chapel, which is grade I listed

The manor of Columbjohn in the parish of Broadclyst was purchased by Sir John Acland, MP and High Sheriff of Devon. Shortly afterwards, in 1612, the adjoining estate of Killerton was purchased by his nephew Sir Arthur Acland of Acland in the parish of Landkey. The present Georgian Killerton House was built by Sir Thomas Acland, 7th baronet, in 1778. The chapel was built in 1738 to the designs of Charles Robert Cockerell.

The garden was created in the 1770s by John Veitch, one of the leading landscape designers of the time. It features rhododendrons, magnolias, herbaceous borders and rare trees, as well as an ice house and early 19th-century summer house. The surrounding parkland and woods offer several circular walks. Plans attributed to William Sawrey Gilpin (1762-1843) for a new drive from Killerton to Columbjohn (1820) were not implemented. A short play about the meeting between Veitch and Gilpin was commissioned by the National Trust to be performed in the gardens of Killerton in mid 2016.

Killerton was given to the National Trust by the British politician Sir Richard Acland, 15th Baronet in 1944, and in September 2015 the National Trust commissioned a short drama to be staged on the site entitled The Gift, written by Eileen Dillon, telling the story of Sir Richard's decision to hand over his estate.

== Lost house ==
In 2016 an archaeological dig discovered what is believed to be a footprint of an intended replacement home to the current Killerton. Reports believe that this is what has been known in history as the lost house of Devon, of 240 years, designed by architect James Wyatt. It is within the grounds a shortish walk from the current site, and its existence was obscured by a copse that looks to have been deliberately planted to hide it.

The National Trust has placed woodwork in the four corners of what is believed would have been the corners of the intended property. They have also placed a door and frame on what they believe would have been the entrance to the intended billiard room. Killerton's information boards on the site state that there is an intention for further archaeological digs in the future.
