= Chichester baronets of Arlington Court (1840) =

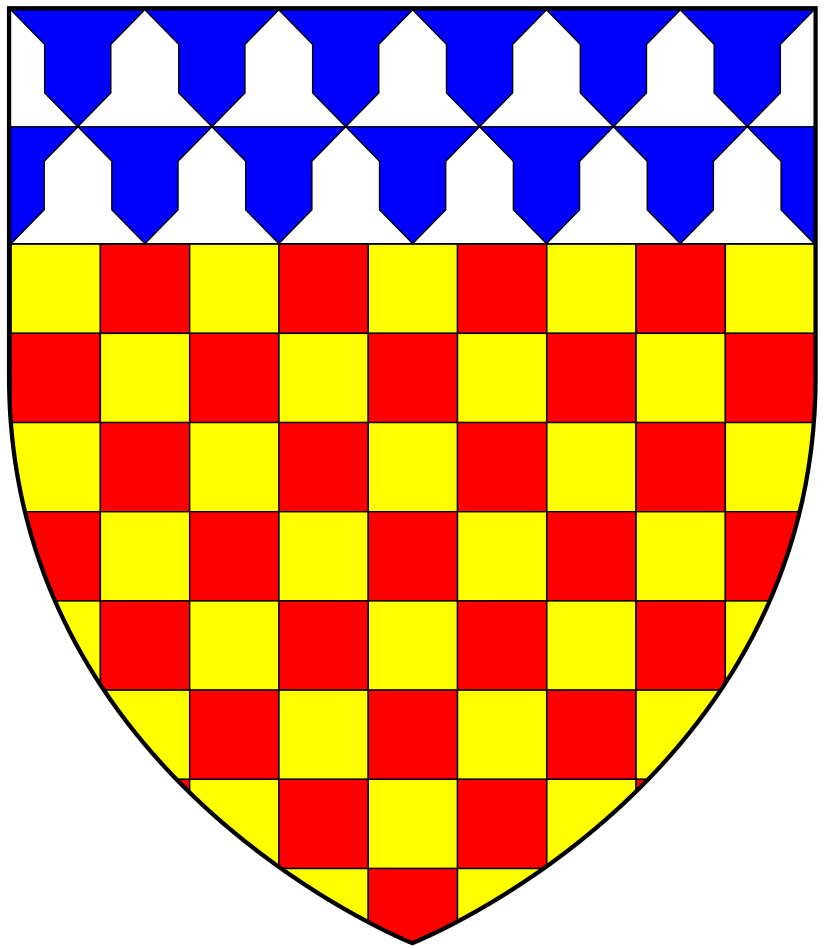
Escutcheon of the Chichester baronets of Arlington Court

The Chichester baronetcy, of Arlington Court in the County of Devon, was created in the Baronetage of the United Kingdom on 7 September 1840 for John Chichester, of Arlington, Liberal Member of Parliament for Barnstaple 1831–1840.

The title became extinct on the death of the 2nd Baronet in 1881. His widow later married her late husband's distant cousin and neighbour, Sir Arthur Chichester, 8th Baronet of Youlston Park, Shirwell, Devon. The 2nd baronet's unmarried daughter and heiress, Rosalie C. Chichester (died 1949), bequeathed the Arlington family seat to the nation in 1949.

== Chichester baronets, of Arlington Court (1840) ==
- Sir John Palmer Bruce Chichester, 1st Baronet (died 10 December 1851)
- Sir Alexander Palmer Bruce Chichester, 2nd Baronet (24 December 1842 – 25 January 1881)
