= John Acland =

John Acland may refer to:

== Politicians ==
- Sir John Acland (died 1620) (c. 1552–1620), English MP for Devon 1607–1614
- John Acland (Callington MP) (c. 1674–1703), English MP for Callington 1702–1703
- John Acland (runholder) (1823–1904), New Zealand politician and runholder
- John Dyke Acland (1746–1778), British Army officer and MP for Callington 1774–1778
- John Palmer-Acland (1756–1831), born John Acland, British MP for Bridgwater

== Others ==
- Sir John Acland, 1st Baronet (c. 1591–1647), English royalist
- Sir John Acland, 3rd Baronet (c. 1636–1655), English baronet
- John Acland (author) (c. 1729–1795), English author
- Sir John Dyke Acland, 8th Baronet (1778–1785), British baronet
- John Acland (British Army officer) (1928–2006), British major-general
- Sir John Dyke Acland, 16th Baronet (1939–2009), British baronet
- John Acland (died 1553) of Acland, Landkey, Devon

== See also ==
- Acland (surname)
- Acland baronets
