= Chichester baronets of Raleigh (1641) =

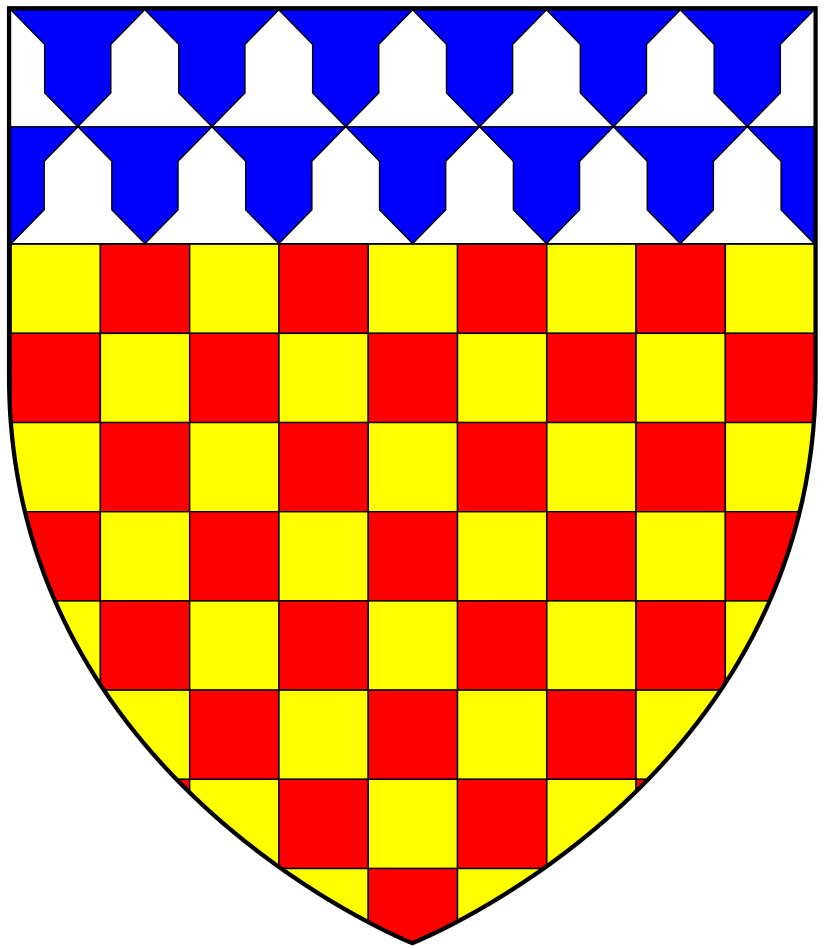
Escutcheon of the Chichester baronets of Raleigh

The Chichester baronetcy, of Raleigh in the County of Devon, was created in the Baronetage of England on 4 August 1641 for John Chichester (1623–1667).

== 1st Baronet ==
John Chichester (1623–1667) was MP for Barnstaple, Devon. He was the son of Sir Robert Chichester, knight (1579–1627) of Raleigh (whose monument with effigies exists in Pilton Church), by his second wife Ursula Hill. Sir Robert was the son of Sir John Chichester by his wife Ann Denys, daughter of Sir Robert Denys (d. 1592), MP, of Holcombe Burnell, Devon. John was the eldest surviving son.

== Succession ==
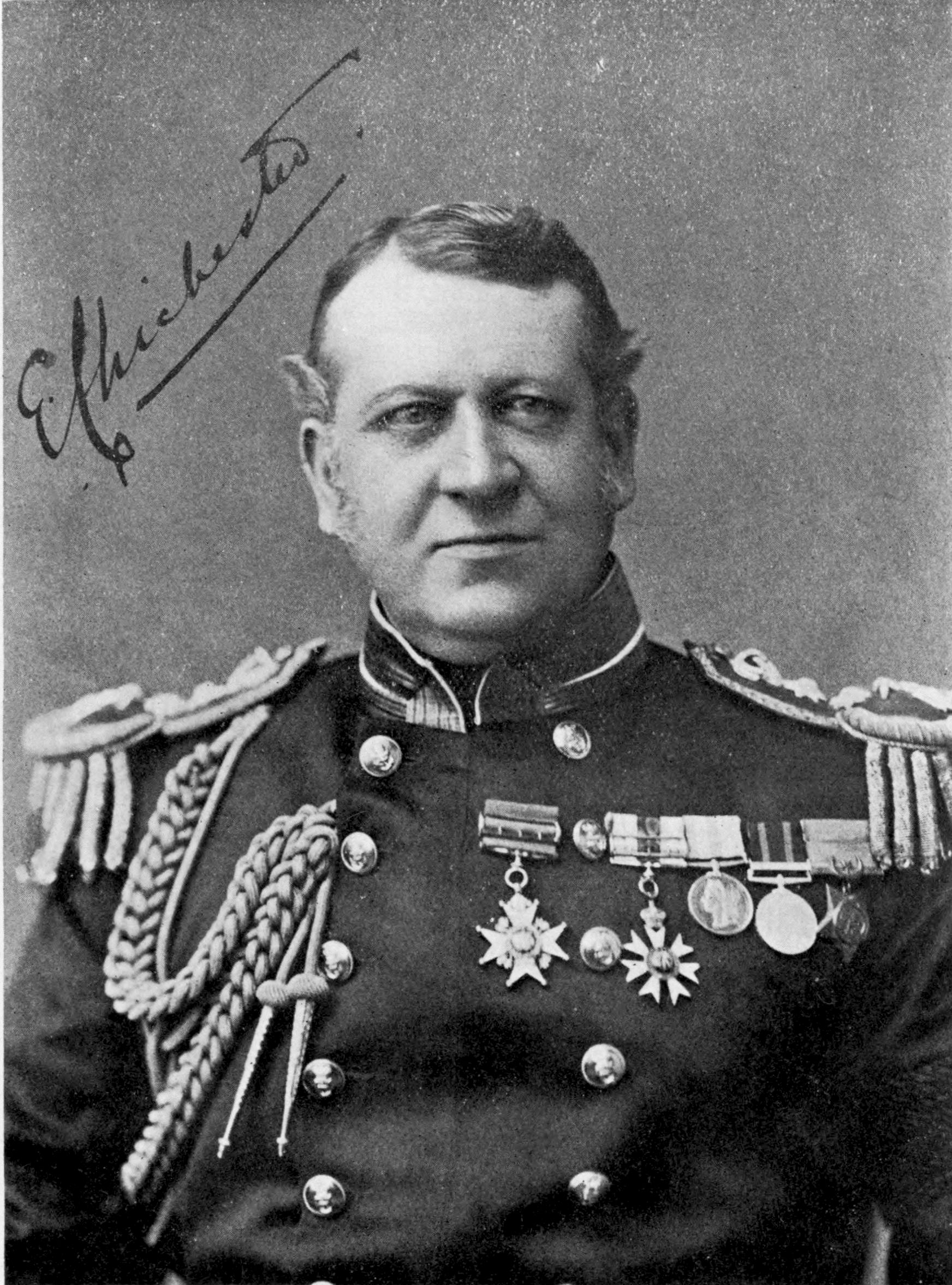
Rear-Admiral Sir Edward Chichester, 9th Baronet (1849–1906)

The 1st Baronet's eldest son, John Chichester, the 2nd Baronet, died childless at an early age and was succeeded by his younger brother, Arthur Chichester, the 3rd Baronet. He too represented Barnstaple in the House of Commons. On his death in 1718 the title passed to his son, John, the 4th Baronet who sat as MP for Barnstaple again.

His son, John, the 5th Baronet, and his son, John, the 6th Baronet, both served as High Sheriff of Devon (from 1753 to 1754 and from 1788 to 1789 respectively). The latter died unmarried in 1808 and was succeeded by his first cousin once removed, Arthur, the 7th Baronet whose seat was Youlston Park, Shirwell, Devon. He was the grandson of Reverend William Chichester, younger son of the 4th Baronet, and was High Sheriff of Devon between 1816 and 1817.

His son, Arthur, the 8th Baronet, was a Deputy Lieutenant and Justice of the Peace for Devon. He was succeeded by his eldest son, Edward, the 9th Baronet. He was a Rear-Admiral in the Royal Navy, Naval Aide-de-Camp to Queen Victoria and King Edward VII and Admiral Superintendent of the Naval Establishment in Gibraltar. As of 2026 the title is held by his great-grandson James, the 12th Baronet, who succeeded in 2007.

- Sir John Chichester, 1st Baronet (23 April 1623 – 2 November 1667)
- Sir John Chichester, 2nd Baronet (c. 1658 – 16 September 1680) (son)
- Sir Arthur Chichester, 3rd Baronet (c. 1662 – 3 February 1718) (brother)
- Sir John Chichester, 4th Baronet (2 June 1689 – 2 September 1740) (son)
- Sir John Chichester, 5th Baronet (26 March 1721 – 18 December 1784) (son)
- Sir John Chichester, 6th Baronet (c. 1752 – 30 September 1808) (son)
- Sir Arthur Chichester, 7th Baronet (25 April 1790 – 30 May 1842) (cousin)
- Sir Arthur Chichester, 8th Baronet (4 October 1822 – 13 July 1898) (son)
- Rear-Admiral Sir Edward Chichester, 9th Baronet (20 November 1849 – 17 September 1906) (son)
- Sir Edward George Chichester, 10th Baronet (22 January 1888 – 26 September 1940) (son), Commander, Royal Navy Naval Brigade. He fought in the Second Anglo-Boer War, most notably in the siege of Ladysmith.
- Sir (Edward) John Chichester, 11th Baronet (14 April 1916 – 14 May 2007) (son). Son of Sir Edward George Chichester, 10th Baronet, by his wife Phyllis Dorothy Compton, educated at Radley College, Abingdon, and at the Royal Military College, Sandhurst. He was a Lieutenant in the Royal Navy Volunteer Reserve and a captain in the service of the Royal Scots Fusiliers and fought in the Second World War. After the war he was King's Messenger between 1947 and 1950 and worked for Imperial Chemical Industries between 1950 and 1960. Chichester married the Hon. Anne Rachel Pearl, daughter of John Douglas-Scott-Montagu, 2nd Baron Montagu of Beaulieu, and Alice Pearl Crake, on 23 September 1950. They had two sons and three daughters. He died in May 2007, aged 91, and was succeeded in the baronetcy by his eldest son, James.
- Sir James Henry Edward Chichester, 12th Baronet (born 15 October 1951) (son)

The heir apparent is Edward John Chandos-Pole Chichester (born 1991).

== Extended family ==
The aviator and world-circumnavigating sailor Sir Francis Chichester was the son of Reverend Charles Chichester, seventh son of the 8th Baronet.

== Background ==
Raleigh was a manor held by the Chichester family in the parish of Pilton, near Barnstaple.

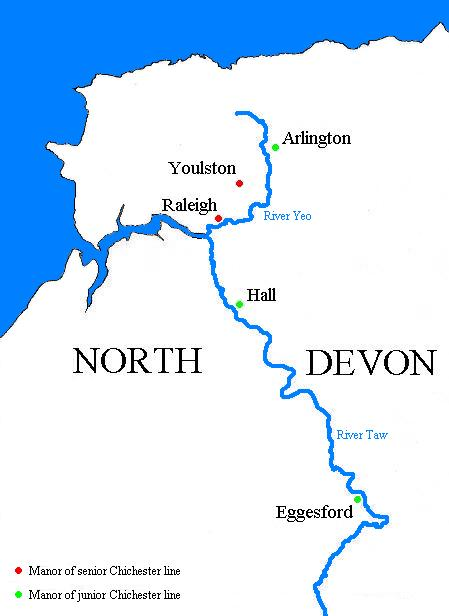
Location of historic Chichester family manors: Raleigh in the parish of Pilton; Youlston in the parish of Shirwell; Arlington; Hall in the parish of Bishops Tawton (also Pill, Bishop's Tawton); Eggesford House, Eggesford

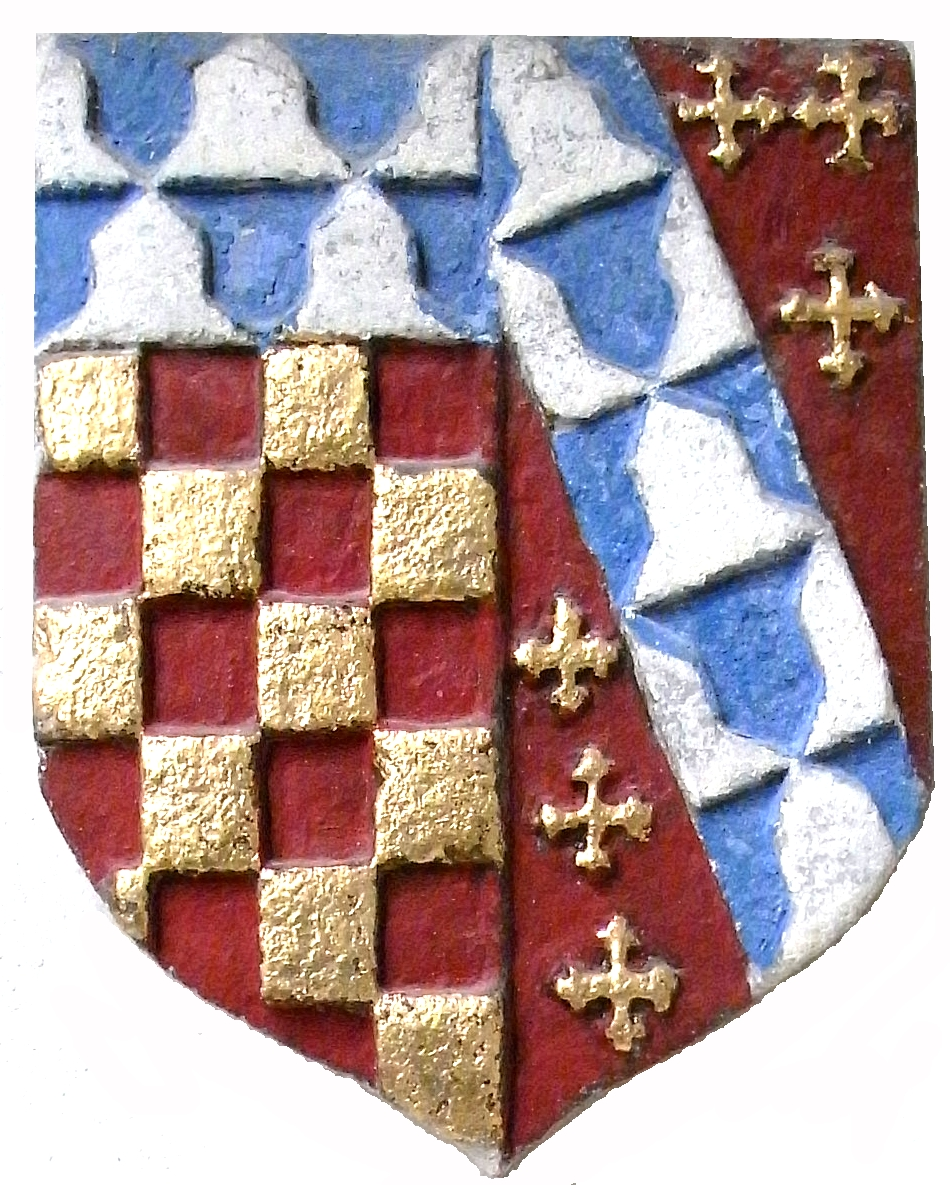
2Arms of Chichester impaling de Raleigh, painted on stone escutcheon in strapwork surround on monument to Sir John Chichester (died 1569) in Pilton Church, Devon.

Arms of de Raleigh: Gules, a bend vair between six cross-crosslets or

Sir John Chichester (d. 1569), knight, of Raleigh, whose elaborate monument (without effigy) exists in Pilton Church, was also father of Arthur Chichester, 1st Baron Chichester of Belfast (1563–1624/5), and of Edward Chichester, 1st Viscount Chichester (1568–1648), of Eggesford, Devon, ancestor of the Marquesses of Donegall (see this title for more information on this branch of the family).

=== Arms of Raleigh ===
The arms of Raleigh are: Gules crusilly or, a bend vair, and are also shown as the second quartering of ten on an escutcheon on top of the monument. By marriage to the Raleigh heiress in the 14th century the Chichester family acquired the manor of Raleigh in the parish of Pilton, and many others. These arms are also those blazoned for "Henri de Ralle" on the following mediaeval rolls of arms: Dering Roll (185), St George's Roll (E406), Heralds' Roll (HE317), Charles' Roll (F207).
