= Arlington Court =

Country house in Devon

Coordinates: 51°8′46″N 3°58′56″W

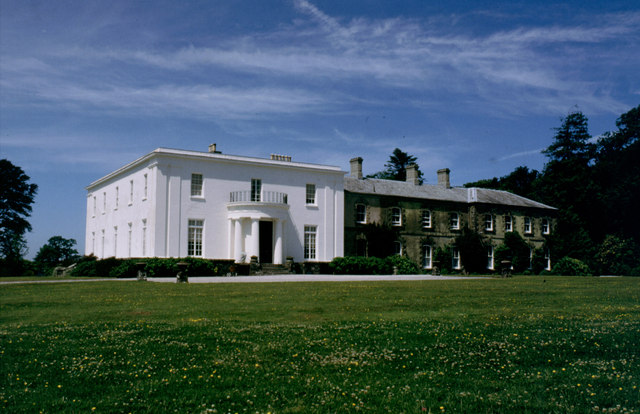
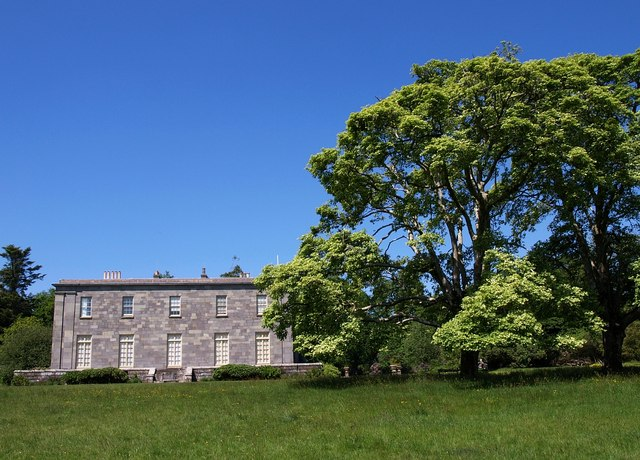
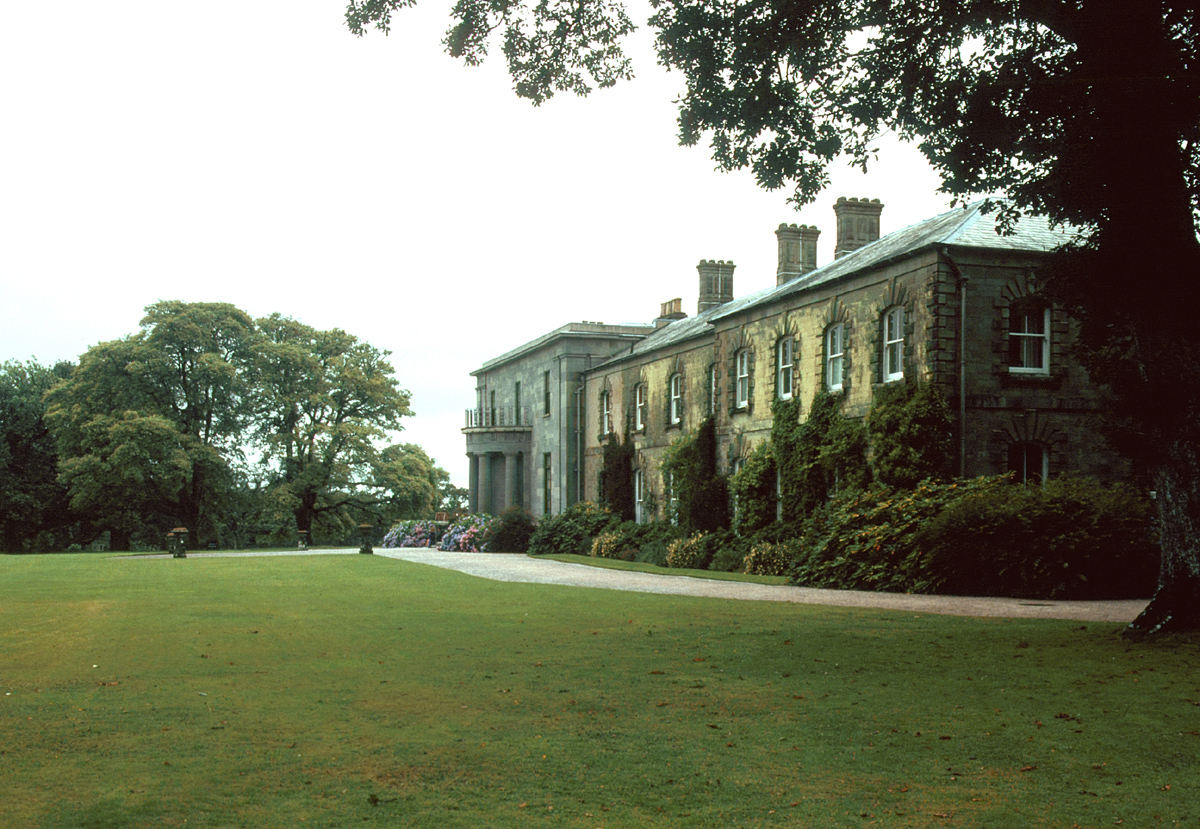
Arlington Court

Arlington Court is a neoclassical style country house built 1820–23, situated in the parish of Arlington, next to the parish church of St James, 5 1/4 miles NE of Barnstaple, north Devon, England. It is a Grade II* listed building. The park and gardens are Grade II* registered on the National Register of Historic Parks and Gardens.

The house was commissioned by Colonel John Palmer Chichester (1769-1823) to the design of the North Devon architect Thomas Lee, replacing the earlier Georgian house of about 1790, built on a different site and demolished, designed by John Meadows. Arlington Court was considerably expanded in 1865 by John Palmer Chichester's grandson, Sir Alexander Palmer Bruce Chichester, 2nd Baronet (1842-1881), son of Sir John Palmer Bruce Chichester, 1st Baronet (d.1851). In 1873 according to the Return of Owners of Land, 1873 the Arlington estate comprised about 5,300 acres.

Sir Bruce's unmarried daughter and heiress, Rosalie Chichester (d. 1949), donated the mansion to the National Trust together with 3,500 acres (14 km^{2}) two years before her death in 1949.

Today, the house, together with the Chichester family's collection of antique furniture and an eclectic collection of family memorabilia, is fully open to the public.

== Architecture ==
Arlington Court, Ground Floor; 1: Staircase Hall; 2: Entrance Hall; 3: Morning Room; 4: Ante Room; 5: White Drawing Room; 6: Boudoir; 7: Music Room; 8: Dining Room; 9: Model Ship Lobby; 10: not open; 11: not open; 12: not open; 13: Kitchen (now Restaurant); 14: not open; 15: not open; 16 now Restaurant.

The architecture of the house, a severe neoclassical style, which in many ways resembles the architecture made popular in the early 19th century by Sir John Soane, under whom Arlington's architect Thomas Lee trained. Often mistakenly likened to the slightly more flamboyant Greek Revival architecture, the style confines most ornament to the interior of the house, leaving the symmetrical exterior almost unadorned and chaste, relying only on window and door apertures and shallow recesses and apses and the occasional pilaster to relieve the austerity of the facade; at Arlington, this is seen in the shallow twin pilasters terminating the two principal façades, the lack of either aprons or pediments to the windows and, in place of the near conventional classical entrance portico of the era, is a single-story, semi-circular pillared porch. The simplicity of the design is further accentuated by a low, unpierced parapet concealing the roof-line from view; thus giving the building a low, box-like appearance.

From completion, the house remained largely unaltered until the 1860s, when the house was almost doubled in size by Sir Alexander Bruce Chichester, who added the large domestic wing (rooms 9 to 16 on plan) in which to house the servants and provide the extended domestic offices which were considered necessary during the Victorian era. Following the invention of the bell pull, a convenient device which negated the need for servants to be constantly within calling distance of the main house, servants began to be housed in a designated wing; thus affording their employers greater privacy.

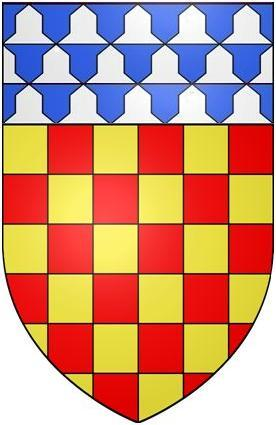
The arms of Sir John Chichester of Raleigh, knight

Sir Alexander (a man of extravagant tastes, whose expenditure was to ultimately bring the family to the point of financial ruin) also created the large, central staircase hall (marked 1 on the plan); this was achieved by combining several smaller rooms on the ground and upper floors. The style of the hall, that of a Renaissance courtyard, overlooked by a gallery reached from an imposing staircase was a fashionable country house feature of the time – providing a common assembly area for house-guests and a convenient space to display works of art and curiosities; similar halls can be seen at Highclere Castle, Mentmore Towers and Halton House. Often known as lounge halls, they were usually furnished as with comfortable chairs and sofas and often a grand piano. Contemporary pictures show that this was the case at Arlington too. The hall is dominated by an enormous imperial staircase rising to the gallery above. The stairs are lit by an internal window displaying the various Chichester arms from 1505 to 1865.

The principal reception rooms of the house are arranged as an enfilade; folding screens concealed by scagliola ionic columns permits the enfilade to be transformed into a tripartite gallery seventy feet long. Originally conceived as a drawing room (5), ante room (4) and dining room (3), the dining room was transformed into a morning room during the alterations of the 1860s. Architecturally, the most interesting of the rooms is the ante room. A cube room, it has a saucer dome, segmental arches and inset pier glasses, all in the style of Soane, whose pupil, Lee, was responsible for the house.

Also of note is the boudoir (6); this small room conceived a sitting room for the ladies of the house retains much of its original plasterwork and decoration in the style of Soane. Later additions include the marble fireplace, and mirrored alcoves and pilasters to the corners, creating an elongated hexagonal shape also in the style of Soane. Other rooms are now much altered, the dining room (8) was created from the former library in the 1860s, while the music room's once ornate and painted papier mache ceiling is now lost due to the building deprivations following World War II. At the time, the National Trust, permitted to carry out only limited work, prioritised the creation of staff flats on the upper floor, over the conservation of the house.

In Britain, by the beginning of the 19th century, the Baroque convention of placing the grandest reception rooms on the upper floor or piano nobile had been discontinued; therefore, the upper floor at Arlington contains only bedrooms, dressing rooms and nurseries. Many of these have now been transformed into accommodation for National Trust staff. Among the few upper rooms open to the public are Miss Chichester's Bedroom, the former day nursery, the Blue Bedroom and the Portico Bedroom . The latter, sited over the Entrance hall, was traditionally the bedroom of the master of the house; it is distinguished by its vaulted ceiling.

== Chichester family ==
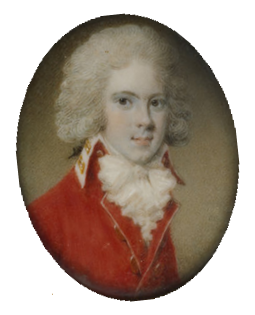
Colonel John Palmer Chichester (1769-1823), builder of Arlington Court. Portrait miniature attributed to Philip Jean, c.1790. National Trust, Arlington Court Collection, ref: ARL 2NT

The Chichester family, which in 2012 still exists in several branches and survives in North Devon at Hall, two miles SE of Bishops Tawton, was historically one of the leading ancient gentry families of Devon, having been established in 1384 at the manor of Raleigh, in the parish of Pilton near Barnstaple, upon the marriage of John Chichester of Somerset to Thomasine de Ralegh, daughter and heiress of Sir John de Ralegh. The site of the great manor house of Raleigh, which was sold by Sir Arthur Chichester, 3rd Baronet (c.1662-1718) to Arthur Champneys, MP, a Barnstaple merchant, is now occupied by a disused 1960's concrete building, part of the complex of North Devon District Hospital. The present Georgian mansion called Raleigh House was built on a site directly above the old mansion by Nicholas Hooper, whose father Sir Nicholas Hooper, MP, had purchased the manor from Champneys in 1703. The Chichester family thenceforth lived at Youlston. According to the hearth tax returns of 1664, which showed Raleigh still to have been owned by Sir John Chichester, 1st Baronet, of Raleigh (1623-1667) it had 24 hearths, making it one of the largest houses in North Devon, possibly second largest after Tawstock Court. The manor of Arlington was also inherited from the de Ralegh family, and was thus one of the family's most ancient Devon possessions. It was later given by the Chichesters to a younger son from a second marriage, Amyas Chichester (d.1577), who married Jane Giffard, daughter of Sir Roger Giffard of Brightley in the parish of Chittlehampton, and by her produced a family of nineteen sons and four daughters, thus establishing there his own branch of the family. The large family of Amyas is referred to by Charles Kingsley in Westward Ho! Hall in the parish of Bishops Tawton was inherited in 1461 by Richard Chichester on his marriage to Thomasine de Halle, daughter and heiress of Simon de Halle. The manor of Shirwell, in which is situated Youlston House, was inherited by the Chichester family temp. Henry VII (1485-1509) by marriage to Margaret Beaumont, daughter and co-heiress of Sir Thomas Beaumont, whose family had resided at Youlston since the reign of Henry I (1100-1135). Shirwell is adjacent to the south of Arlington. Margaret Beaumont's sister and co-heiress Joan Beaumont married into the Basset family of Whitechapel and Tehidy, to which family she brought the other Beaumont lands of Umberleigh and Heanton Punchardon. The pioneering yachtsman Sir Francis Chichester (1901-1972) was the son of Rev. Charles Chichester, appointed by the family as parson of Shirwell, seventh son of Sir Arthur Chichester, 8th Baronet (1822-1898), of Youlston. He was buried at St Peter's church in Shirwell where two monuments to him exist. His younger son is Giles Chichester (b. 1946), former Conservative Member of the European Parliament for South West England and Gibraltar, who stood down in 2014. (For the history of the wider family see Marquess of Donegall and Chichester baronets).

Sir Alexander Palmer Bruce Chichester, the last male Baronet of Arlington court, was born in Malta in 1842 and later married Rosalie Amelie Chamberlyne in 1865. Despite nearly 16 years together the marriage only produced one child, Rosalie Caroline Chichester, and with Sir Bruce's sudden death in 1881, at the age of only 38, his young family were left with hefty debts which were only, finally paid off some 45 years later. His widow continued to reside at Arlington, with their 16-year-old daughter, Rosalie, until her death in 1908. After her mother's death Miss Chichester remained at the house with a live-in companion Clara 'Chrissie' Peters.

=== Rosalie Chichester ===
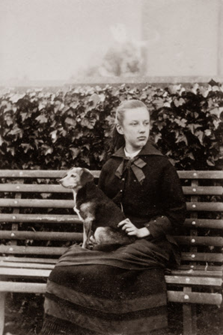
Rosalie Chichester with her dog Memory, c.1885, from a family album at Arlington Court. NT Arlington Court Collection no. 48341

Rosalie Caroline Chichester (1865-1949) was a strong-willed woman and a talented artist with a particular love of flora and fauna. Although her father had kept his own pack of hounds at Arlington, known as "Sir Bruce Chichester's Foxhounds", she developed a strong aversion to hunting. The Arlington Estate lay in the centre of the territory hunted by Sir Ian Amory's Staghounds (or The Barnstaple Staghounds) and other packs, and stags at the end of hunts frequently stood at bay in the ornamental lake in front of Arlington House. After an occasion in 1897 when such an event had occurred and the stag had been dispatched in the lake, 31-year-old Miss Chichester's coachman delivered a sealed letter to Mr R. Sanders, Master of the Devon and Somerset Staghounds, at a meet of the Staghounds. The letter stated that "the Loxhore covers on the Arlington Estate were not to be hunted". Not only was that day's hunting ruined, but this action caused much consternation in the high society of North Devon, who were then overwhelmingly supporters of hunting, and caused great interruption to several local hunts. Although her wishes were complied with as far as possible, there were several incidents of hounds entering the forbidden areas. The hunts paid to erect fencing to discourage hunted deer from entering the Arlington Estate, but without total success.

Again in 1900 a hunted stag was killed in the lake, and Miss Chichester threatened Sir Ian Murray Heathcoat-Amory, 2nd Baronet (1865–1931), then resident at Hensleigh, Tiverton, with an injunction. The masters made every effort to abide by her wishes but the hunt followers became exasperated, and a small group, in open defiance of her instructions, pointedly galloped across her lawn in full view of the house. She sent a warning telegram to Sir Ian Amory threatening an injunction and finally issued two summonses against Mr Peter Ormrod, Master of Peter Ormrod's Staghounds, for trespass. She similarly summonsed the masters of the Barnstaple Staghounds and the case went to the High Court on 23 January 1902.

The hunts agreed to abide by her ban as far as they were able, and this was the position, with occasional breaches, until the present day. A notable breach occurred in 1920 when the huntsman of the Tiverton Staghounds with a small group of followers followed a hunted stag into the grounds of the house, breaking down with their shoulders the big wooden drive gate which was chained and locked. He had suspected rightly that the stag would go to bay in the ornamental pond, and had to get in to manage the hounds. The result was described by one of the party: "The clatter and noise of our arrival broke things up and we left the precincts and the stony stare of Miss Chichester herself as fast as we could". Miss Chichester's step-brother and neighbour at Youlston Rear-Admiral Sir Edward Chichester, 9th Baronet, although not himself a hunting man, had little sympathy for her and on 25 February 1904 wrote a letter to the North Devon Journal opposing her suggestion that shooting was a more humane method of deer control: "Dear Sir, Having read a lot of twaddle lately in the papers about the hunting of red deer in this district which has been described as inhuman and cruel, and as the owner of Arlington has suggested to me through her Man of Law that the alternative of shooting them should be resorted to...". Rosalie never married and engaged in a variety of interests including photography, painting and touring the globe. Many of her paintings can still be seen at Arlington, including those of her beloved parrot 'Polly' as well as many other depictions of still lives and animals.

Miss Chichester finally died in 1949 at her other property in Woolacombe aged 85. Her ashes were returned to Arlington and are interred beside the lake, the location marked by a commemorative urn and pedestal.

== Carriage Museum ==
The National Trust Arlington Court Carriage Museum is home to a collection of over 50 horse-drawn carriages, with a carriage "for every occasion from cradle to grave". Two prominent carriages in the collection are the State Chariot built in London between 1830 and 1846 by Adams and Hooper, and the Travelling Chariot built in London between 1815 and 1820 by Howe and Shanks.

Arlington Court

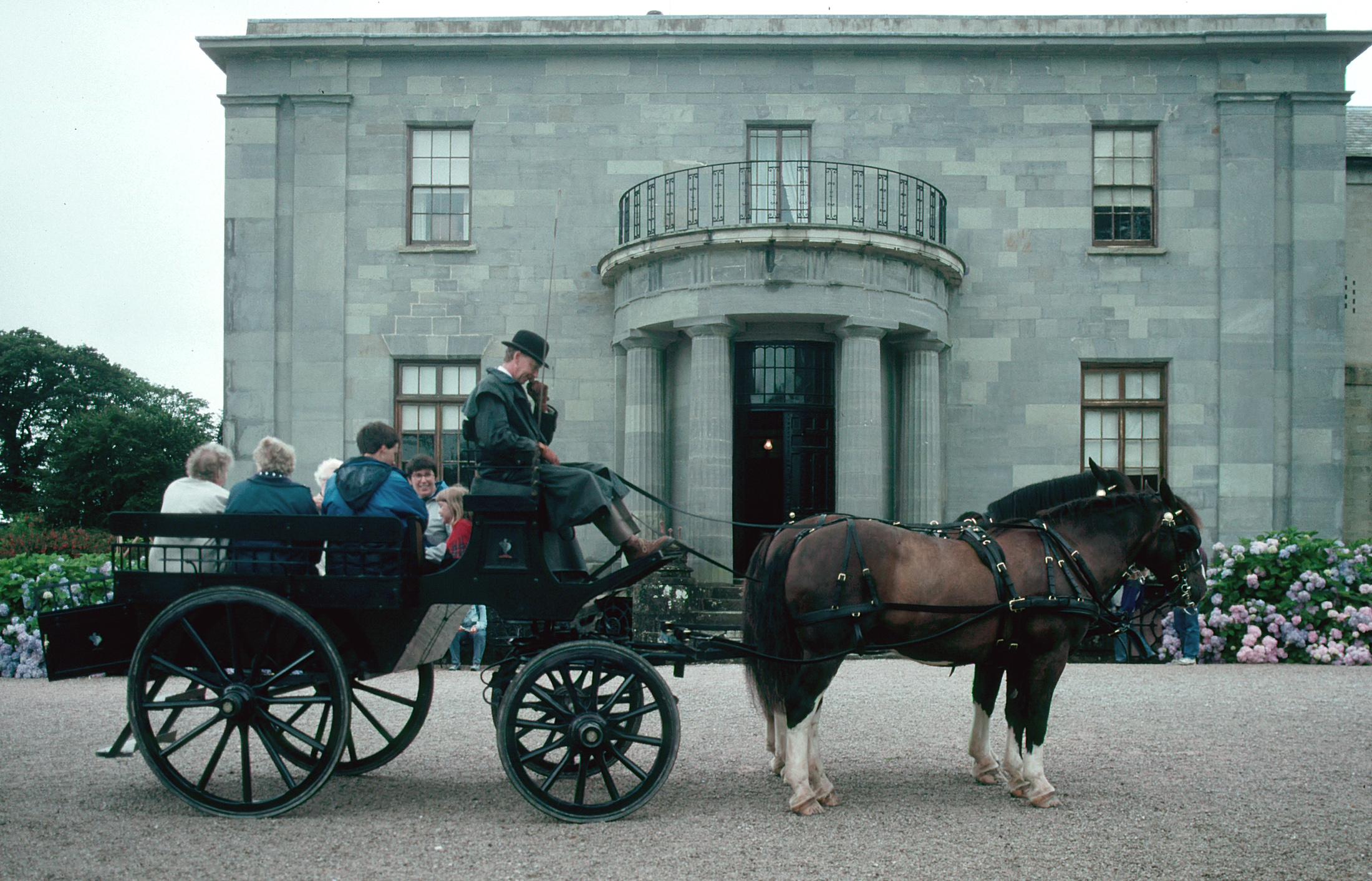
Arlington Court in 1993

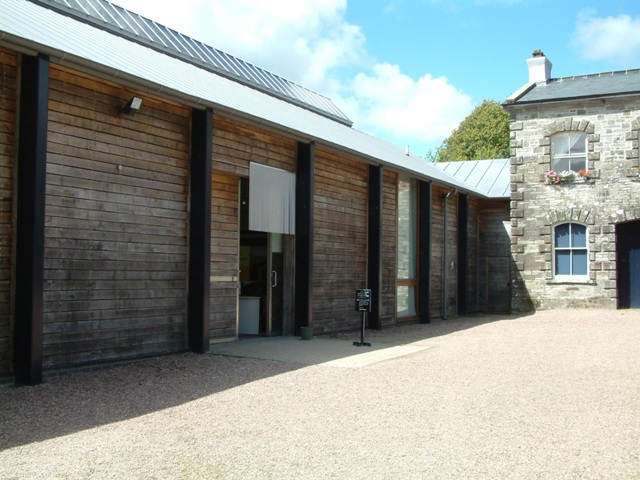
Carriage museum

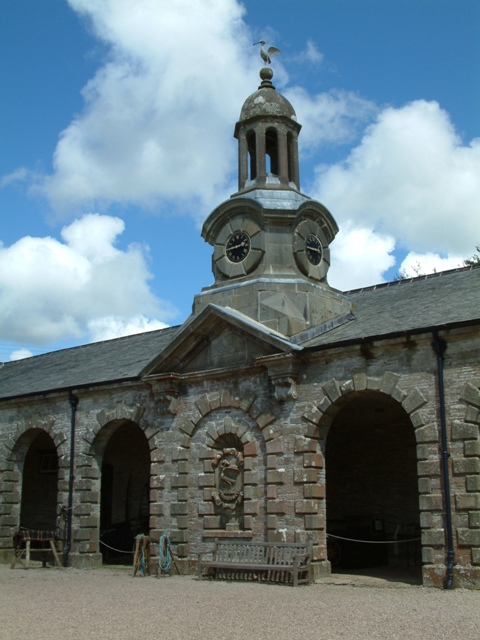
Stables

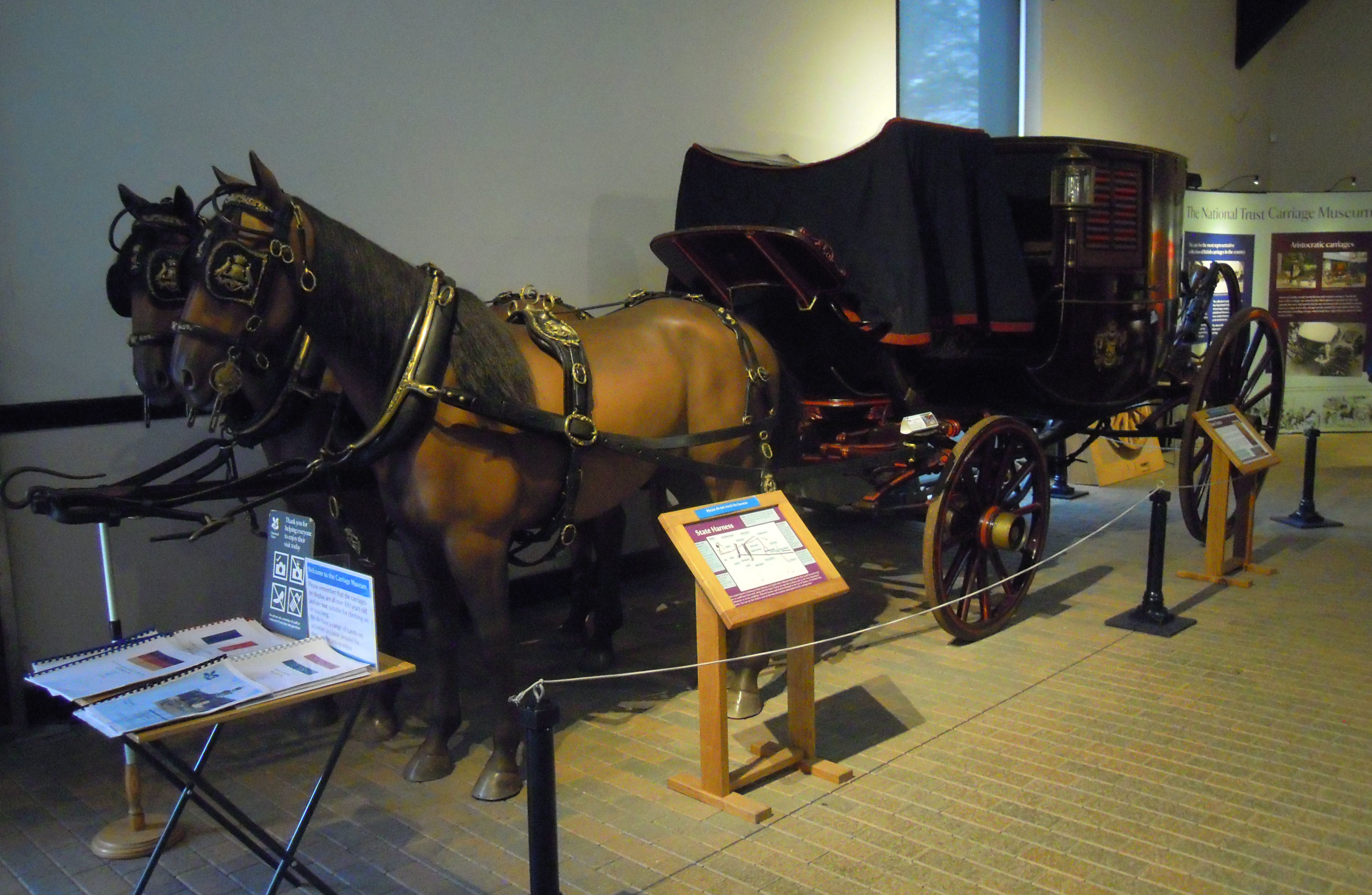
The State Chariot and Harness exhibit
