= Sir Arthur Chichester, 8th Baronet =

Sir Arthur Chichester, Bt DL JP
- Born: 4 October 1822; Sherwell
- Died: 13 July 1898 (aged 75)
- Education: Eton College
- Spouse(s): Mary Nicholetts (m. 1847; died 1879) Rosalie Amelia Chamberlayne (m. 1883; died 1898)
- Children: 14, including Edward
- Parent(s): Sir Arthur Chichester, 7th Baronet; Charlotte Hamlyn-Williams
- Relatives: Sir Francis Chichester (grandson)

Sir Arthur Chichester, 8th Baronet DL JP (4 October 1822 – 13 July 1898), of Youlston Park, Sherwell, was an English landowner, soldier and baronet.

== Early life ==
Chichester was born in Sherwell on 4 October 1822. He was a son of Sir Arthur Chichester, 7th Baronet (1790–1842), who served as High Sheriff of Devon, and Charlotte Hamlyn-Williams (c. 1798–1834). Among his siblings were sisters Charlotte Elizabeth Chichester, who married the Rev. Richard John Beadon in 1848, and Blanche Chichester, who married John Toller Nicholetts in 1855.

His paternal grandparents were John Chichester (a son of the Rev. William Chichester, Rector of Georgeham and Shirwell, himself the youngest son of Sir John Chichester, 4th Baronet) and Elizabeth Cory. His maternal grandparents were Sir James Hamlyn-Williams, 2nd Baronet and Diana Anne Whittaker (a daughter of Abraham Whittaker). His great-aunt, Marianne Whittaker, married Sir Thomas Gooch, 5th Baronet.

He was educated at Eton College.

== Career ==
Chichester was gazetted a Cornet in the 7th Hussars on 18 June 1841. Upon the death of his father, Chichester succeeded to the title of 8th Baronet Chichester, of Raleigh, Devon, on 30 May 1842. His father had inherited the baronetcy from his cousin, Sir John Chichester, 6th Baronet, who died unmarried in 1808.

On 15 January 1847, he was made a Captain in the 7th Hussars, shortly before he retired in 1848. He served as Deputy Lieutenant of Devon and as a Justice of the Peace for Devon. He gained the rank of Honorary Colonel in 1862 in the service of the Royal North Devon Yeomanry.

== Personal life ==
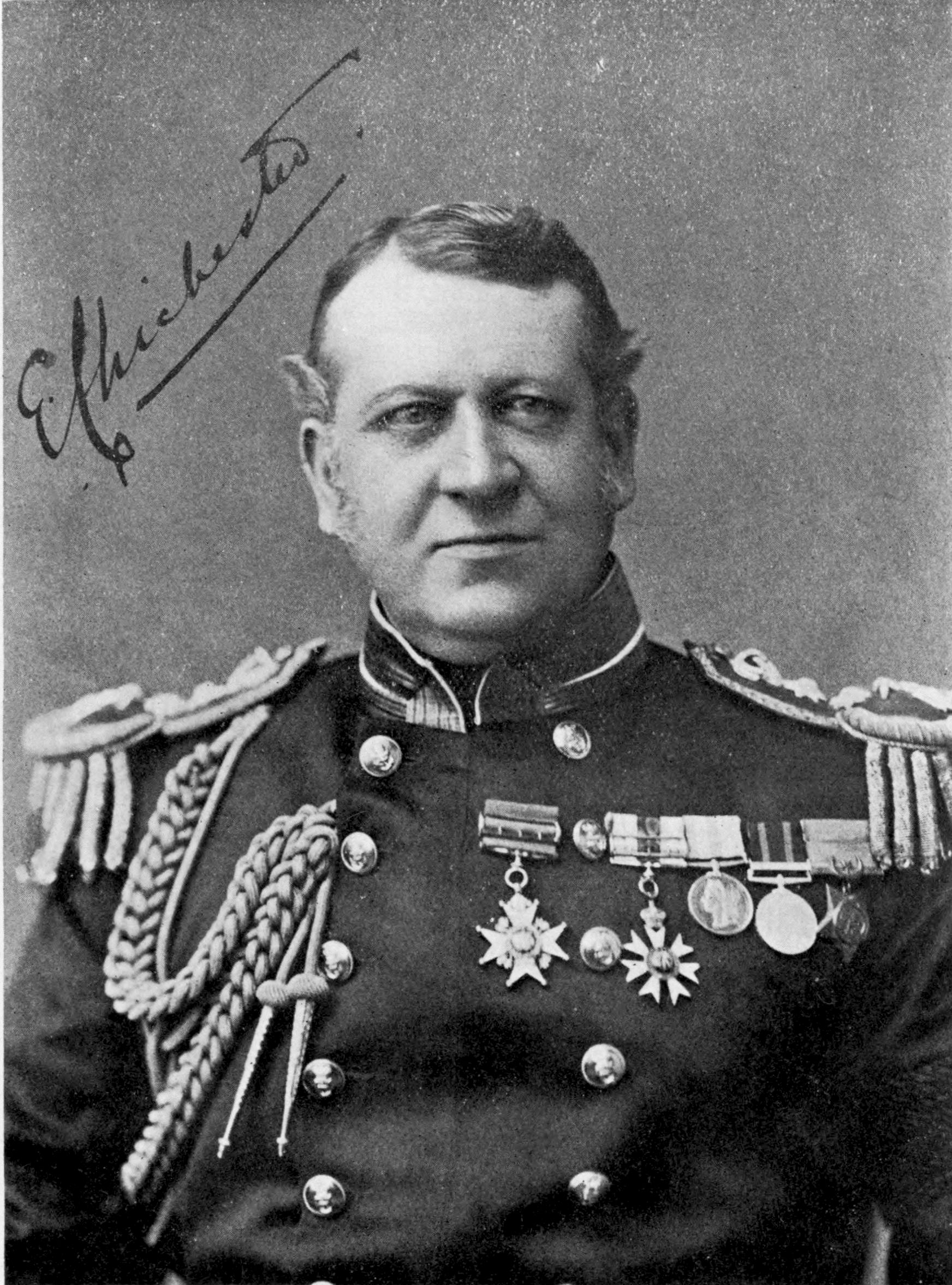
Photograph of his son, Rear-Admiral Sir Edward Chichester, 9th Baronet

On 20 November 1847 in Somersetshire, Chichester was married to Mary Nicholetts (1829–1879), eldest daughter of John Nicholetts of South Petherton, Somerset. Before her death at Youlston on 28 June 1879, they were the parents of fourteen children, including:

- Rev. Arthur Chichester (1848–1898), who married Emily Constance Sargent in 1869.
- Sir Edward Chichester, 9th Baronet (1849–1906), a Rear Admiral in the Royal Navy; he married Catharina Emma Whyte, a daughter of Cmdr. Robert Charles Whyte of Instow, North Devon in 1880.
- Beatrice Chichester (1850–1931), who married Charles Chichester, son of Robert Chichester and Clarentina Mason, in 1870.
- Henry Chichester (1851–1929), who married Adah Georgiana Holloway, daughter of Horatio Francis Kingsford Holloway and Mary Ann Breton, in 1876.
- Norah Chichester (1852–1933), who married Francis Bernard Parr Manning, a Licentiate of the Royal College of Physicians, in 1899.
- Eveline Chichester (1854–1947), who married Edward Fairfax Studd, son of Maj.-Gen. Edward Mortlock Studd and Emma Beatrice Bayly, on 3 April 1877.
- Geraldine Chichester (1858–1930), who married Percy Williamson Barons Northcote, son of the Rev. George Barons Northcote, in 1888.
- Gerard Chichester (1859–1906), an Honorary Lt.-Col. in the 4th Battalion, North Staffordshire Regiment; he married Alice Pinckney, daughter of George Pinckney, in 1891.
- George Chichester (1865–1933), who married Frances Caroline Hibbert, daughter of Col. Hugh Robert Hibbert, in 1900. After her death, he married her sister, Essex Mary Hibbert, in 1908.
- Rev. Charles Chichester (1868–1938), the Rector at Shirwell; he married Emily Annie Page, a daughter of Samuel Page, in 1896.
- Orlando Chichester (1873–1933), a Captain in the 6th Battalion, Devonshire Regiment; he married Isabel Clare Parks-Smith, daughter of Egerton Parks-Smith, in 1899.

After the death of his first wife, he married Rosalie Amelia (née Chamberlayne), Lady Chichester (1843–1908), a daughter of Thomas Chamberlayne of Cranbury Park and widow of his distant cousin, Sir Alexander Chichester, 2nd Baronet (son of Sir John Chichester, 1st Baronet), on 23 January 1883. Among her siblings were Tankerville Chamberlayne, MP, Francesca Maria Chamberlayne (wife of Cecil Howard, 6th Earl of Wicklow) and Agnes Caroline Chamberlayne (wife of Lt.-Col. George Charles Keppel Johnstone, a son of Sir Frederick Johnstone, Bt). From her first marriage, she was the mother of Rosalie Chichester, who donated all of her property to the National Trust, including Morte Point and the fully intact Arlington Court estate when she died in 1949.

Sir Arthur died on 13 July 1898. As his eldest son predeceased him, he was succeeded in the baronetcy by his second son, Edward. His widow, Rosalie, died on 22 August 1908.

=== Descendants ===
Through his seventh son, the Rev. Charles Chichester, he was a grandfather of pioneering yachtsman Sir Francis Chichester (1901–1972), and great-grandfather of Giles Chichester (b. 1946), the Conservative Member of the European Parliament for South West England and Gibraltar.

Baronetage of England
Preceded by Arthur Chichester	Baronet (of Raleigh); 1842–1898	Succeeded by Edward Chichester
