= Sir John Chichester, 4th Baronet =

British landowner and Tory politician

Member of Parliament for Barnstaple
- In office 1734–1740 Serving with Theophilus Fortescue
- Preceded by: Theophilus Fortescue; Richard Coffin
- Succeeded by: Theophilus Fortescue; John Basset

Personal details
- Born: 1689
- Died: 2 September 1740 (aged 50–51)
- Spouse(s): Anne Leigh (m. 1715; died 1723) Frances Hall (m. 1733; died 1740)
- Parent(s): Sir Arthur Chichester, 3rd Baronet; Elizabeth Drewe

Arms of Chichester: Chequy or and gules, a chief vair

Sir John Chichester, 4th Baronet (1689 – 2 September 1740) of Youlston Park in the parish of Shirwell near Barnstaple, Devon was a British landowner and Tory politician who sat in the House of Commons from 1734 to 1740.

== Early life ==
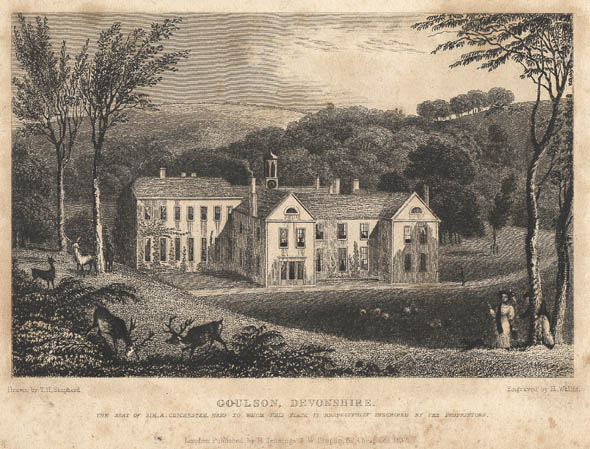
Youlston House, Shirwell, Devon, 19th-century engraving with caption: "Goulson [sic], Devonshire, the seat of Sir A. Chichester, Bart., to whom this plate is respectfully inscribed by the publishers".

Chichester was baptized on 2 January 1689, the eldest son and heir of Sir Arthur Chichester, 3rd Baronet, MP of Youlston, near Barnstaple, Devon, and his wife Elizabeth Drewe, daughter of Thomas Drewe of The Grange, Broadhembury, Devon.

== Career ==
In 1718, he succeeded to the baronetcy on the death of his father.

Chichester was a Jacobite during the first few years of the reign of King George I (1714–1727) and was in touch with Atterbury’s agents during the plot of 1722. He was returned unopposed as Member of Parliament for Barnstaple at the 1734 British general election. He voted against the Spanish convention, but made little other impression in Parliament.

== Personal life ==
In about 1715, Chichester married Anne Leigh (1695–1723), daughter and heiress of John Leigh of Apse, Newport, Isle of Wight, MP for Newport. Before her death in July 1723, they were the parents of the following children:

- Katherine Chichester, who married George III Musgrave of Nettlecombe and Combe Sydenham, both in Somerset, in 1740.
- Anne Chichester (b. 1719), who married William Sanford of Nynehead, Somerset.
- Florence Chichester, who married Rev. John Sanford, Rector of Moniton, Somerset.
- Sir John Chichester, 5th Baronet (1721–1784), the High Sheriff of Devon in 1753; he married Frances Chudleigh, a daughter of Sir George Chudleigh, 4th Baronet, and Frances Davie (co-heiress of Sir William Davie, 4th Baronet of Creedy, Sandford)
- Rev. William Chichester (1722–1770), Rector of Georgeham and Shirwell; he married Mary Bellarmine, daughter of John Bellarmine (or Ballyman) of Hart, Heanton Punchardon, Devon.
- Charlotte Chichester (1723–1748)

His wife Anne died in July 1723 and in 1733 he married, as his second wife, Frances Hall, widow of Francis Hall (died 1728) of West Sandford, Crediton, and daughter of Andrew Quicke (1666–1736) of Newton St. Cyres, Devon.

Chichester died on 2 September 1740 and the baronetcy passed to his eldest son John.

=== Descendants ===
Through his eldest son John, he was a grandfather of Sir John Chichester, 6th Baronet, who died unmarried in 1808 without issue.

Through his second son, William, he was a grandfather of Sir Arthur Chichester, 7th Baronet (1790–1842), who was the heir of his cousin John and father to Sir Arthur Chichester, 8th Baronet.

== Supplementary material on Chichester's marriages ==
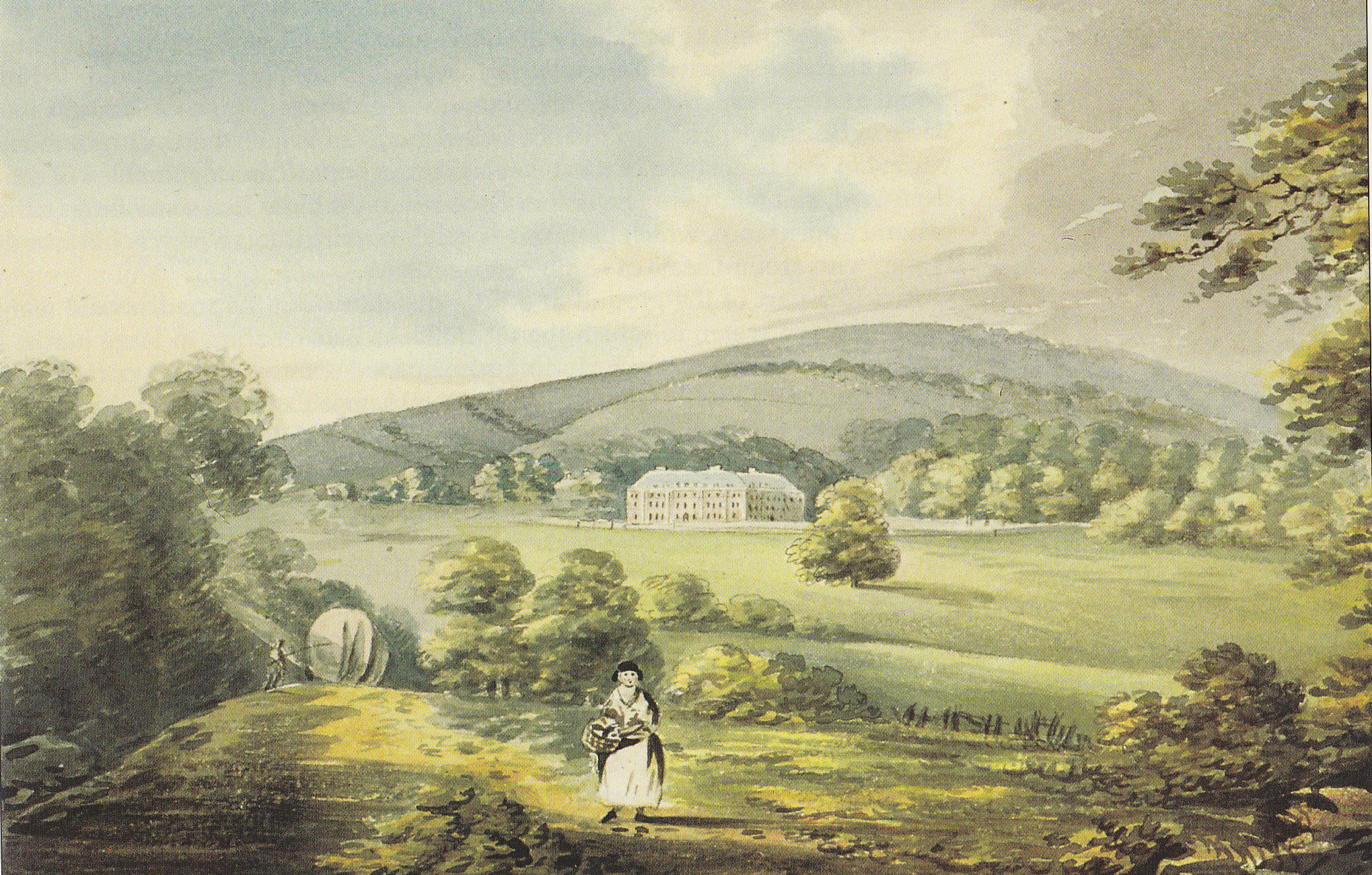
"Sandford, seat of Sir John Chichester, Bart." (i.e. Sir John Chichester, 6th Baronet (died 1808, grandson of the 4th Bt). Water-colour painting of West Sandford House, 2 1/2 miles NW of Crediton, Devon, by Rev. John Swete, 1797. Devon Record Office, 564M/F11/118

The marriage settlement of Chichester and his first wife Anne Leigh, dated 12 October 1715, is held by North Devon Record Office, summarised as follows:

(1) Sir Arthur Chichester of Youlston, Bart., Elizabeth his wife, and his son and heir apparent, John Chichester, esq. (2) Anne Leigh, only daughter and heir of John Leigh, late of Newport, deceased. (3) John IV Courtenay (died 1724) of Molland, esq. (the father-in-law of John Chichester's sister Mary, married to George Courtenay (1701–1731)), William Bragg of Sadborough, Parkham esq., William Page of Fremington, esq., and Claver Morris of Wells, Doctor of Physic, trustees.

Recites that (2) covenants that, within one year of reaching the age of 21 years, she will convey to (3) all lands, etc., bequeathed to her by her father John Leigh, deceased (Manor of Apse, Newport, Isle of Wight), (1) covenant to convey to (3) the manors of Bratton Fleming, Loxhore, Shirwell, Stoke Rivers, and Brendon; and also Youlston Barton, Youlston Park, Brendon Barton, Bratton Mills, Ash tenement, and Slowly tenement, in Braunton, Shirwell, Brendon, and Bratton Fleming parishes; and also all messuages of (1) in Pilton and Barnstaple, and also the advowsons of Brendon, Shirwell, and Georgeham; and also a chief rent of £14. 18s. 6d. from the Borough of Barnstaple.

Francis Hall, the former husband of Chichester's second wife Frances is stated as of "West Sandford"

A monument to Francis Hall (died 1728) exists in Newton St Cyres Church. West Sandford was a very large mansion about 2 1/2 miles NW of Crediton, near the ancient Chichester estate of Ruxford, of which a watercolour painting was made in 1797 by the Devon topographer Rev. John Swete. The latter wrote of West Sandford in his Travel Journal in 1797 as follows:

"The appearance of this house, built with brick and decorated with white mouldings, is of great respectability. Its contiguous gardens with high walls and large gates and the groves that shelter it on the NE speak it to have been the residence of some person of consequence who had a relish for things of former days and was too advanced in years to adopt the improvements of modern taste. It was long the property and abode of Lady Chichester and by her decease a few years ago became a possession of Sir John Chichester of Youlston, Bart. Beheld in its two fronts from a rising point of the public road it had such extent of building as to possess a degree of magnificence; nor has it less to recommend itself for its situation, having spread out before its windows some of the richest pasture ground in the county. What ingredients of the picturesque, taking advantage of the road as a foreground, may enter into the composition of the scenery, may be collected from the following sketch".

This large house appears to have disappeared with little trace, no mention of it being made by Pevsner or Hoskins, the leading modern authorities on such matters.

== Sources ==
- Vivian, Lt.Col. J.L., The Visitations of the County of Devon: Comprising the Haralds' Visitations of 1531, 1564 & 1620, Exeter, 1895.
- Archives of the Chichester Family of Devon, North Devon Record Office, ref:48/25, covering dates 1450–1874

Parliament of Great Britain
Preceded by Theophilus Fortescue; Richard Coffin	Member of Parliament for Barnstaple; 1734–1740; With: Theophilus Fortescue	Succeeded by Theophilus Fortescue; John Basset
Baronetage of England
Preceded by Arthur Chichester	Baronet (of Raleigh); 1718-1740	Succeeded by John Chichester
