= Imperial staircase =

Type of staircase with divided flights

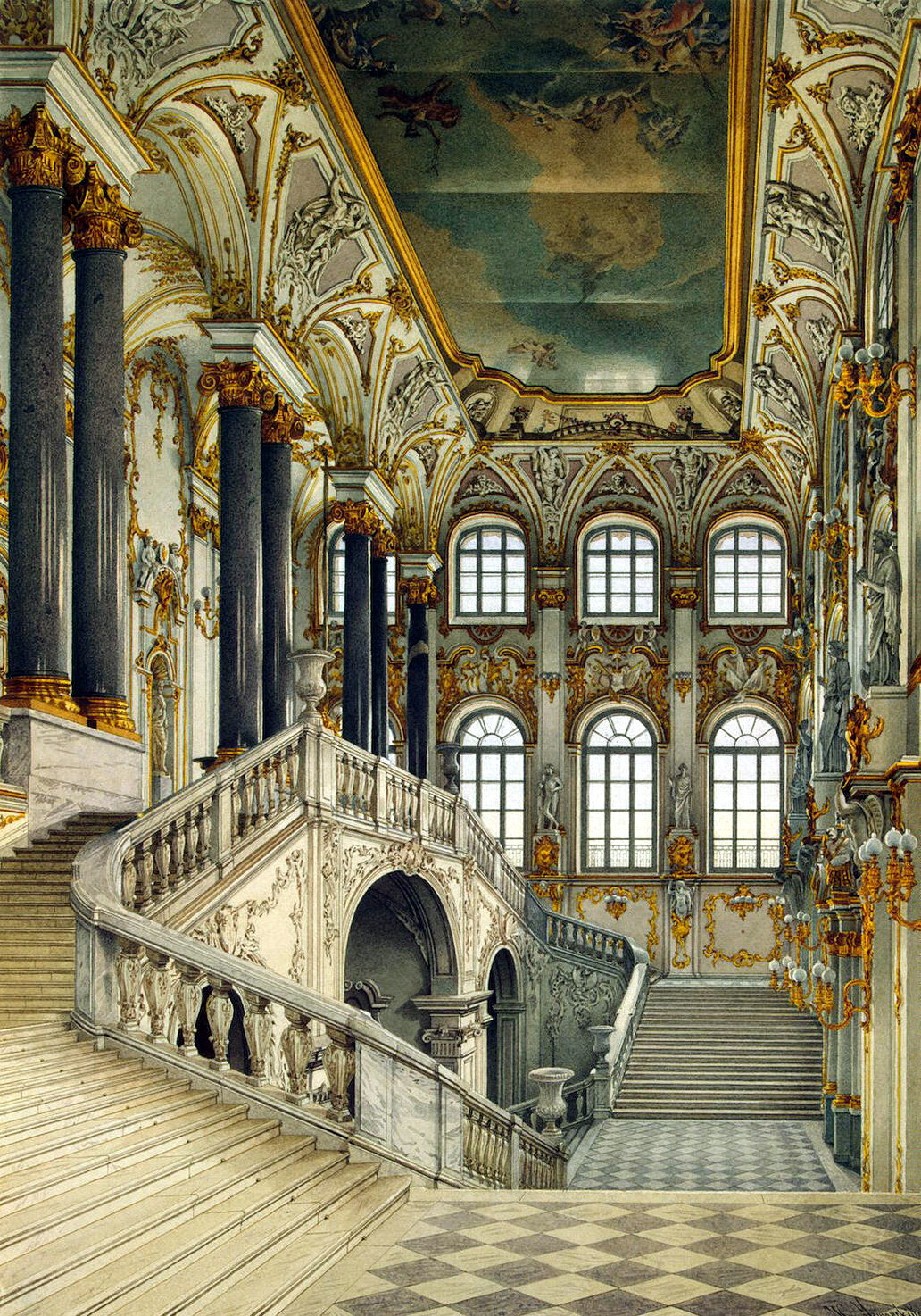
The imperial staircase of the Winter Palace, St Petersburg, looking down to the first landing

An imperial staircase (sometimes erroneously known as a "double staircase") is the name given to a staircase with divided flights. Usually the first flight rises to a half-landing and then divides into two symmetrical flights both rising with an equal number of steps and turns to the next floor. The feature is reputed to have first been used at El Escorial. One of the grandest examples, the Escalier des Ambassadeurs at the Palace of Versailles, was built by 1680 but demolished in 1752 as the palace was rearranged. The Jordan Staircase of the Winter Palace is a notable example, while other such staircases can be found at Buckingham Palace, Windsor Castle, Palazzo Reale di Caserta, Palacio Real de Madrid, and Mentmore Towers.

The advantages of an imperial staircase became apparent during the 18th century, when Matthew Brettingham revolutionised the design of the piano nobile of the London town house. Guests would proceed through a series of reception rooms arranged as a circuit. At large gatherings the two branches could ease the flow of guests arriving and departing, or moving between a ballroom and a supper room on the floor below. An imperial staircase is often used today for similar reasons where two streams of people are moving in opposite directions in buildings as diverse as an opera house to a railway station. This use explains why the first single flight is often wider than the following two divided flights, although narrowing flights are also an architectural trick to lengthen perspective in order to increase the impression of size.

An imperial staircase should not be confused with a double staircase, an external feature and common motif seen rising to the entrances of many houses in the Palladian style, such as those at Kedleston Hall, Derbyshire. Double staircases as opposed to imperial staircases are more often of just two flights (hence the name) leaving the ground symmetrically to join one common destination. Occasionally, especially in the architecture of the Sicilian Baroque, they will leave the ground as one flight and then divide, but this is less common. One may also see an imperial staircase in the form of two flights rising to join and then continue as one flight, but this is rare.

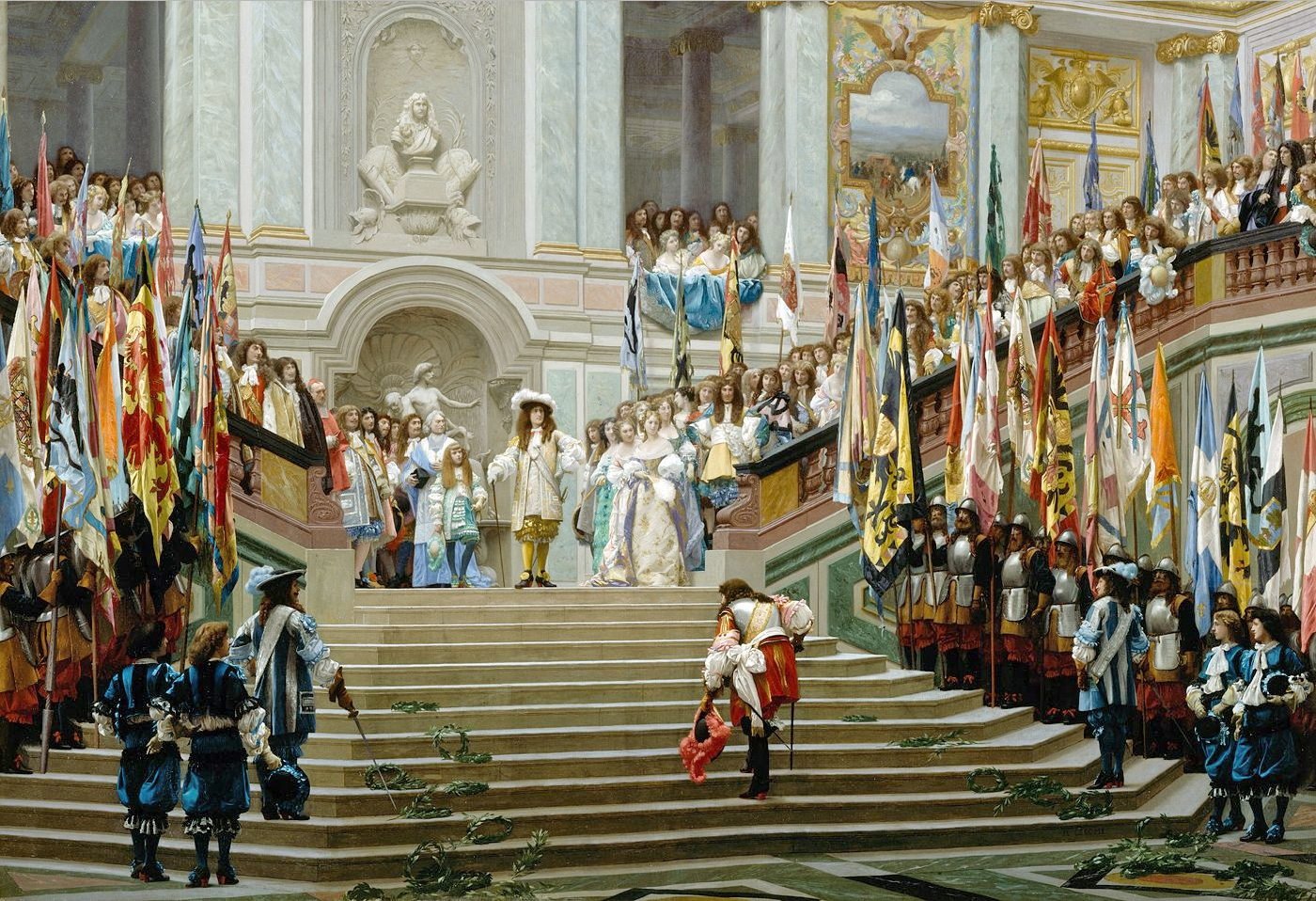
Réception du Grand Condé à Versailles, Jean-Léon Gérôme, 1878, showing the demolished Escalier des Ambassadeurs

A computer generated plan of the imperial staircase at Arlington Court

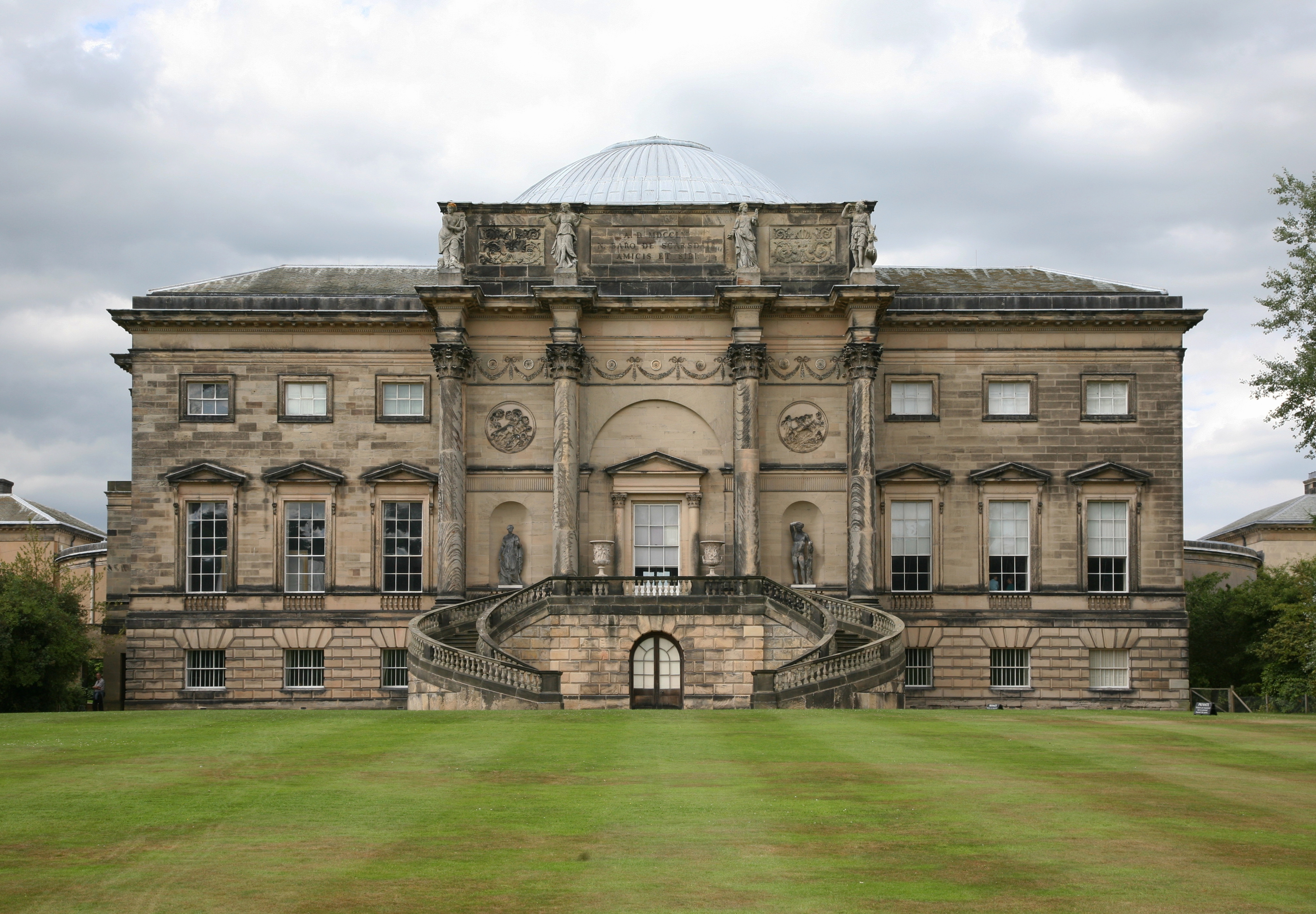
A double staircase differs from an imperial staircase, by having two flights leading to one destination, rather than one flight dividing to two further flights
