= Nicholas Dennys =

English politician (1616–1692)

Nicholas Dennys (Bap. 13 November 1616 – Bur. 31 May 1692) was an English politician who sat in the House of Commons from 1660 to 1678.

Dennys was the son Thomas Dennys, yeoman, of Ilfracombe, Devon. He matriculated at Pembroke College, Oxford on 11 July 1634, aged 18. He was called to the bar at Inner Temple in 1646.

In 1660, Dennys was elected Member of Parliament for Barnstaple in the Convention Parliament. He was re-elected MP for Barnstaple for the Cavalier Parliament in 1661 and sat until 1678. He became a bencher of his Inn in 1662.

Dennys died in 1692 and was buried at Milton Damerel on 31 May 1692, aged 75.

Parliament of England
| Preceded by Philip Skippon; John Dodderidge | Member of Parliament for Barnstaple; 1660-1679; With: John Rolle 1660; Sir John Chichester 1661-1667; Sir John Northcote, 1st Baronet 1667- John Basset | Succeeded by John Basset; Sir Hugh Acland, 5th Baronet |
