= Sir Edward Chichester, 9th Baronet =

Rear-Admiral Sir Edward Chichester Bt CB CMG ADC
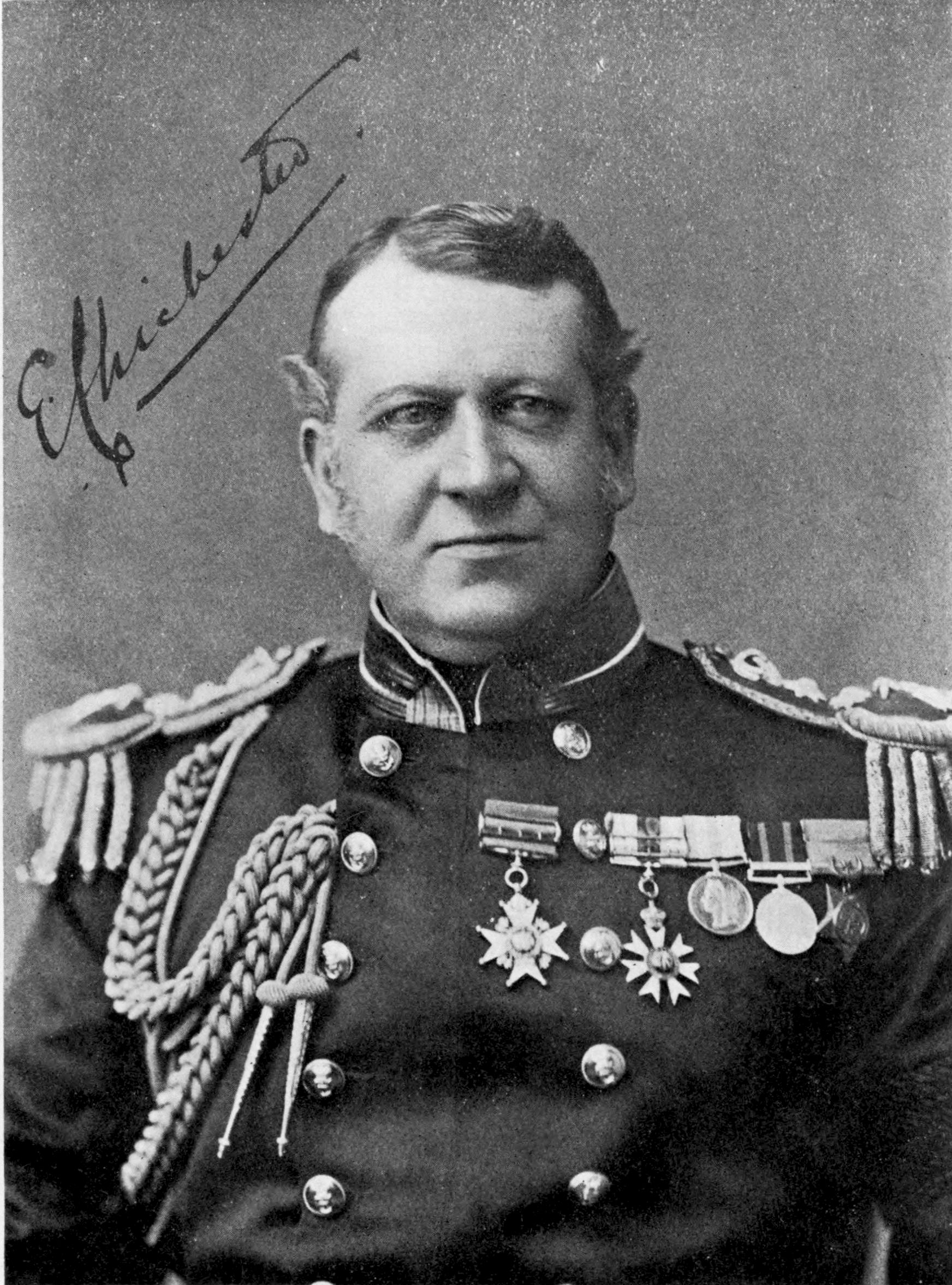
- Rear-Admiral Sir Edward Chichester
- Born: 20 November 1849; Barnstaple, Devon
- Died: 17 September 1906 (aged 56); Gibraltar
- Spouse: Catharina Emma Whyte (m. 1880; died 1906)
- Children: 10
- Parent(s): Sir Arthur Chichester, 8th Baronet; Mary Nicholetts

Rear-Admiral Sir Edward Chichester, 9th Baronet CB CMG ADC (20 November 1849 – 17 September 1906), was an English Rear Admiral and baronet.

== Early life ==
Chichester was born in Barnstaple on 20 November 1849 and was baptised on 24 January 1850 at Sherwell, Devon. He was the second of nine sons of Sir Arthur Chichester, 8th Baronet and Mary Nicholetts, a daughter of John Nicholetts of South Petherton, Somerset.

His paternal grandparents were Sir Arthur Chichester, 7th Baronet and Charlotte Hamlyn-Williams (a daughter of Sir James Hamlyn-Williams, 2nd Baronet).

== Career ==
He fought in the First Boer War in 1881, the Anglo-Egyptian War in 1882, the Egyptian Campaign between 1884 and 1885.

He succeeded as the 9th Baronet Chichester, of Raleigh, on 13 July 1898. His elder brother, Arthur, who had been a Lieutenant in the 95th Foot, died early the same year. He was appointed Companion of the Order of St Michael and St George in 1899. He was Aide-de-Camp to Queen Victoria and Edward VII between 1899 and 1902. He fought in the Second Boer War between 1900 and 1901. He was Admiral Superintendent of the Naval Establishment between 1904 and 1906 at Gibraltar.

== Personal life ==
On 12 October 1880, Chichester married Catharina Emma Whyte (d. 1937), daughter of Commander Robert Charles Whyte of Instow, North Devon. Together, they were the parents of:

- Catherina Edina Chichester (1881–1963), who married Maj. Charles Venables Beresford, son of Judge Cecil Hugh Wriothesley Beresford and Caroline Felice Octavie White, in 1905.
- Sir Edward George Chichester, 10th Baronet (1883–1940), a Commander in the Royal Navy; he married Phyllis Dorothy Compton, daughter of Henry Francis Compton and Dorothy Ann Musgrave, in 1915. They divorced in 1923 and he married Hon. Moira Faith Lilian (née de Yarburgh-Bateson) Fullerton, daughter of Robert de Yarburgh-Bateson, 3rd Baron Deramore and Lucy Caroline Fife, in 1924. They divorced in 1935 and he married Gladys Ethel Fordham, daughter of John Fordham, in 1935.
- Janet Chichester (1884–1966), who married Edward Hornby Beckwith, son of Reverend G. L. Beckwith, in 1904.
- Arthur Whyte Chichester (1885–1951), a Colonel in the Royal Army Service Corps; he married Madeleine Marthe-Lucie Riche, daughter of Riche, in 1921.
- Victoria May Chichester (1887–1968), who married Gilbert Wills, 1st Baron Dulverton, son of Sir Frederick Wills, 1st Baronet and Annie Hamilton, in 1914.
- Robert Charles Chichester (1889–1916), a Lieutenant in the Royal Navy who was killed at the Battle of Jutland.
- Edith Mary Chichester (1891–1976), who married Sir Stephen Bine Renshaw, 2nd Baronet, son of Sir Charles Bine Renshaw, 1st Baronet and Mary Home Stoddard, in 1911.
- Frances "Fanny" Chichester (1892–1989), who married Capt. Patrick Maitland Campbell, son of P. W. Campbell, in 1930. The divorced in 1943.
- Joanna Chichester (1893–1982), who died unmarried.
- Marcus Beresford Chichester (1896–1985), who married Myra K. Brownrigg-Jay, a daughter of Maj. Harvey Brownrigg-Jay, in 1925.

Sir Edward died at Gibraltar on 17 September 1906, aged 56. His widow died on 24 July 1937.

Baronetage of England
Preceded by Arthur Chichester	Baronet (of Raleigh); 1898–1906	Succeeded by Edward George Chichester
