= John Acland (author) =

John Acland (c.1729 – 14 August 1795), was a Church of England clergyman and an author of a pamphlet on poor law reform which foresaw a system of national insurance.

== Biography ==
Acland's father, also named John (1699–1744), was the second son of John Acland, M.P. for Callington, and the younger brother of Sir Hugh Acland, 6th Baronet. He was the vicar of Broadclyst from 1730 until his death. This John married a daughter of Rawlin Mallock (son-in-law of Thomas Gorges and had one son, the present John.

Educated, like his father, at Exeter College, Oxford, he was instituted to the vicarage or rectory of Broad Clyst, on his own petition, in 1753.

In 1786 Acland published A Plan for rendering the Poor independent on Public Contributions, founded on the basis of the Friendly Societies, commonly called Clubs, by the Rev. John Acland, one of His Majesty's Justices of the Peace for the County of Devon. To which is added a Letter from Dr. Price containing his sentiments and calculations on the subject. Tua res agitur. Exeter and London, 1786. From allusions in this pamphlet it seems that Acland's ‘plan’ was suggested to him by the failure of previous legislation for the encouragement of friendly societies in Devonshire. An act of parliament had provided that the funds of friendly societies might be supplemented by grants in aid from the proceeds of the poor-rate; it provided, amongst other things, for the payment of sums of money on the marriages of members and the births of their children. In consequence of the burden entailed on the ratepayers for payments on these accounts, the act was repealed. Acland desired a modified application of the principle. He proposed that ‘there should be established, by the authority of parliament, throughout the whole of the kingdom of England, one general club or society’ for the support of the poor in sickness, in old age, and when out of work. With certain exceptions, every adult male or female receiving a certain wage was to be compelled to contribute to this fund, and a similar obligation was imposed on the bulk of the community. In this way pauperism was to be gradually extinguished, and the recipients of aid from the fund might regard themselves as members of a State Friendly Society. There is an abstract of Acland's crude plan in Eden's State of the Poor. It excited considerable attention at a time when the increase of the poor-rate was causing general anxiety. In 1787 a bill based on Acland's plan was introduced into the House of Commons, but came to nothing.

Of a second pamphlet by Acland, in refutation of Edward King's attempt to prove the public utility of the national debt, the "Gentleman's Magazine" for November 1796 contains a brief and approving notice. There is no copy of this pamphlet in the British Library.

Acland died after a long illness on 14 August 1795, according to his obituary in the Gentleman's Magazine.
