= Thomas Whetham =

English soldier and politician

Thomas Whetham (c. 1665 – 28 April 1741) was an English soldier and politician who sat in the House of Commons between 1722 and 1727.

== Family and early life ==
Whetham was born circa 1665, the first son of the barrister Nathaniel Whetham, of the Inner Temple. His grandfather was Colonel Nathaniel Whetham, who had served in the parliamentary army during the English Civil War.

Thomas Whetham's mother was Elizabeth, daughter of Adrian Scrope of Wormsley, Oxfordshire (now Wormsley Park, Buckinghamshire). His father died in 1667, and he went on to enter military service, joining the 1st Foot as an ensign in 1685.

== Military and political career ==
He transferred to Sir James Lesley's Regiment of Foot in 1694 with the rank of captain lieutenant, and was promoted to captain later that year. He was serving with the 11th Foot as major sometime prior to 1700, and was then with the 27th Foot with the rank of colonel between 1702 and 1705. He was promoted to brigadier-general in 1707. He became Commander-in-Chief, Canada, in 1709, was promoted to major-general in 1710 and was then appointed Commander-in-Chief, Scotland, in 1712. His service had taken him to Scotland, the West Indies and Spain by this stage.

Whetham served under the Duke of Argyll during the Jacobite rising of 1715, commanding the left wing of the government army at the Battle of Sheriffmuir on 13 November 1715. He entered politics in 1722, contesting and being returned to sit for Barnstaple in 1722. He relinquished the seat in 1727 and did not stand for parliament again. He was appointed colonel of the 12th Foot in 1725, holding the appointment until his death. Further promotions followed, to lieutenant-general in 1727 and then general in 1739. He acquired the manors of Kirklington and Hockerton in Nottinghamshire for the sum of £25,000 some time around 1739, and in 1740 he became Governor of Berwick and Holy Island. He had married Mary, daughter of Edward Thompson of Marston, Yorkshire, with whom he had one son and one daughter. General Thomas Whetham died on 28 April 1741.

Military offices
Preceded by Thomas Stanwix	Colonel of Whetham's Regiment of Foot; 1725–1741	Succeeded by Scipio Duroure
Parliament of Great Britain
Preceded by John Rolle; Sir Hugh Acland	Member of Parliament for Barnstaple; 1722–1727; With: Sir Hugh Acland	Succeeded by Richard Coffin; Theophilus Fortescue
