= John Acland (Callington MP) =

English gentleman and MP

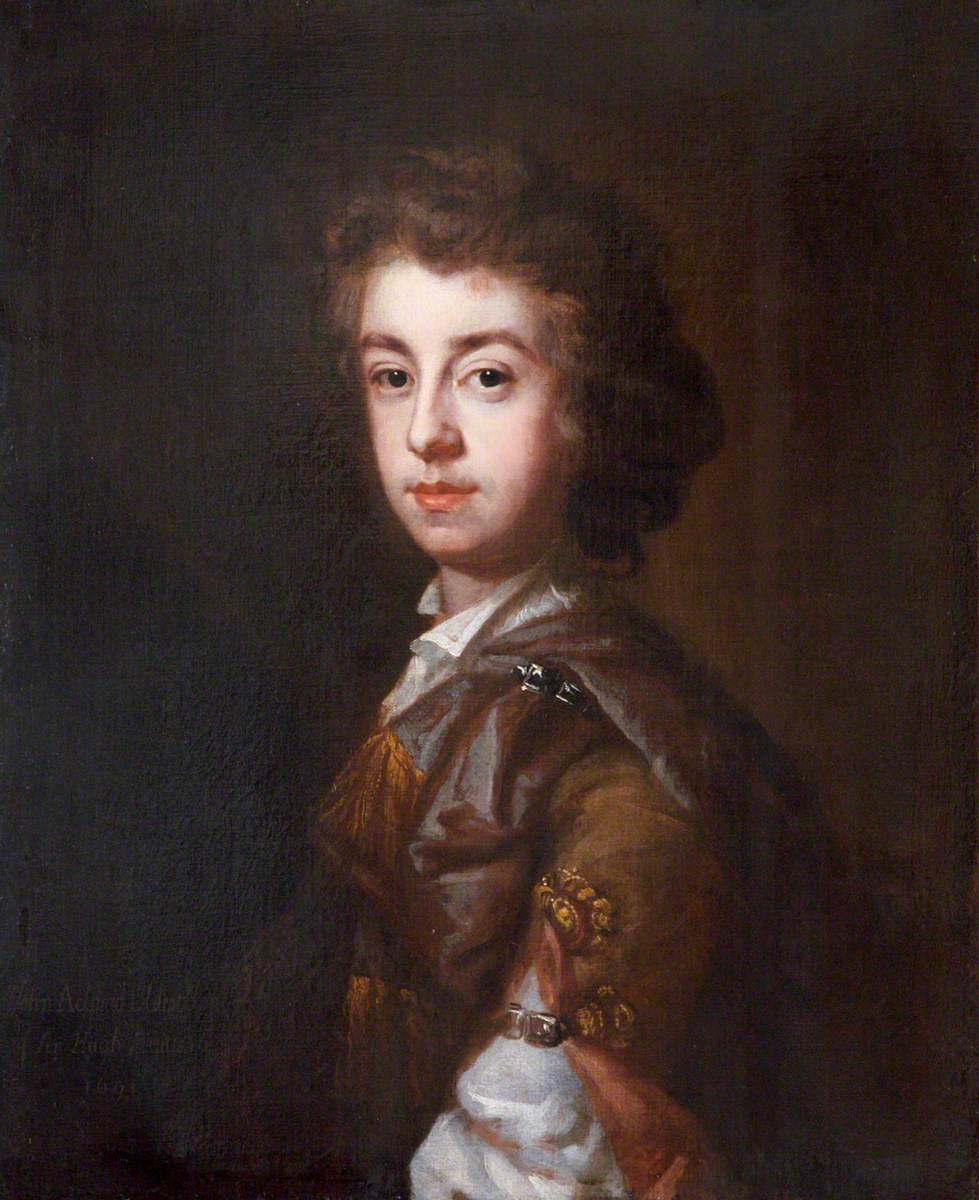

John Acland (c. 1674 – May 1703) was an English gentleman who briefly represented Callington in Parliament. He predeceased his father, Sir Hugh Acland, 5th Baronet.

== Family and education ==
John was born in Devon, the eldest son of Sir Hugh Acland, 5th Baronet and his wife, Anne Daniel, daughter of Sir Thomas Daniel of Beswick Hall, Yorkshire. He matriculated at Exeter College, Oxford on 12 May 1692, at the age of 17.

On 24 March 1695/6, he married a rather distant relative Elizabeth Acland, the daughter of Richard Acland of Barnstaple and sister of Richard Acland. He was survived by four sons and one daughter:

- Sir Hugh Acland, 6th Baronet (c.1696–1728)
- Richard Acland (d. 1735), a Portugal merchant, married Anne, daughter of Peter Burrell of Beckenham and sister of Sir Merrik Burrell, 1st Baronet, and had a daughter Anne, married on 7 May 1761 to Richard Hoare
- Rev. John Acland (1699?–1744), rector of Broadclyst 1730–1744, married and had one son, Rev. John Acland (c.1729–1795)
- Arthur Acland (d. 30 May 1740), married Elizabeth, daughter of Thomas Gilbert, on 18 May 1738, without issue
- Elizabeth Acland (d. 1738), married on 3 May 1726 to Sir John Davie, 6th Baronet

== Career ==
Acland stood for Parliament at Callington on the interest of John Rolle; John Rolle had married his cousin Florence Rolle, whose sister Margaret had married Acland's uncle Sir John Acland, 3rd Baronet. Like his father, he was not active in Parliament. He presumably shared in the Tory proclivities of his father, as he was considered a probable Tacker in a list of 1704, but the compiler was behind the times; Acland had died by then, and was buried at Broad Clyst on 20 May 1703.

Parliament of England
Preceded by Robert Rolle; Samuel Rolle	Member of Parliament for Callington; 1702–1703; With: Samuel Rolle	Succeeded by Samuel Rolle; Sir William Coryton
