= Edward King (antiquarian) =

English barrister, antiquarian and writer

Edward King (1735?–1807) was an English barrister and writer. His best-known works were on castles and antiquities.

== Life ==
Born about 1735, was the only son of Edward King of Norwich. He studied for a time at Clare Hall, Cambridge, as a fellow-commoner, matriculating in 1752. On 18 September 1758 he was admitted a member of Lincoln's Inn, and was called to the bar in Michaelmas term 1763. A fortune bequeathed to him by his uncle, Mr. Brown, a wholesale linendraper of Exeter, gave him financial independence, but he regularly attended the Norfolk circuit for some years, and was appointed recorder of King's Lynn.

King was elected fellow of the Royal Society on 14 May 1767, and Fellow of the Society of Antiquaries of London on 3 May 1770. On the death of Jeremiah Milles in February 1784, King was elected his successor in the presidency of the Society of Antiquaries, though on the understanding that Lord De Ferrars would assume the office on the ensuing 23 April. King sought anyway to obtain re-election, by tactical means, but was defeated.

King died on 16 April 1807, aged 72, and was buried in the churchyard at Beckenham, Kent, where was his country seat was "The Oakery", on Clay Hill. His collections of prints and drawings were sold by auction in 1808.

== Antiquarian works ==
King's treatise Vestiges of Oxford Castle; or, a small fragment of a work intended to be published speedily on the History of Ancient Castles, London, 1796, was followed by his major work entitled Munimenta Antiqua; or, Observations on ancient Castles, including remarks on the … progress of Architecture … in Great Britain, and on the … changes in … Laws and Customs (with Appendix), 4 vols. London, 1799–1806. The book is unreliable, but the content of plans and details was considered significant by antiquaries. Louis Dutens objected to King's theories on the invention of the arch in Recherches sur le tems le plus reculé de l'usage des voûtes chez les anciens, 1805. King the anticipated his fourth volume by publishing, the same year, an Introduction of 21 pages, in which he defended his views. Dutens continued the controversy in three more tracts; King replied in an Appendix to Munimenta Antiqua issued in 1806.

King contributed papers to Archæologia. His speech on quitting the chair of the Society of Antiquaries was printed, and he subsequently printed a letter in vindication of his conduct and reflecting upon the earl, and ceased to communicate with the Society.

Stones said to have fallen from the clouds

In 1796 King wrote whimsical Remarks concerning Stones said to have fallen from the clouds, both in these days and in antient times, occasioned by a supposed shower of stones in Tuscany on 16 June of that year.

== Religious works ==
In 1780 King issued, without his name, Hymns to the Supreme Being, in Imitation of the Eastern Songs, of which two editions were issued in 1795 and 1798. In 1788 he published Morsels of Criticism, tending to illustrate some few passages in the Holy Scriptures, upon philosophical principles and an enlarged view of things. Among other claims, King attempted to prove that John the Baptist was an angel from heaven, and the same who formerly appeared in the person of Elijah. The work was criticised by Richard Gough in the Gentleman's Magazine. A notice of the book in Thomas James Mathias's Pursuits of Literature created some demand for it, and a second edition with a "supplemental part" was published in 1800 (3 vols.), and also a second part of the quarto edition.

In 1793 King published An Imitation of the Prayer of Abel. In 1798 he wrote another tendentious pamphlet, Remarks on the Signs of the Times, in which he demonstrated the genuineness of the second book of Esdras. Irritated by Gough's critique on this tract in the Gentleman's Magazine, he wrote an angry letter to the printer, John Nichols. King added a Supplement to his Remarks in 1799, but this was roughly handled by Bishop Samuel Horsley in Critical Disquisitions on the Eighteenth Chapter of Isaiah, in a letter to E. King, 1799. In 1803 King published anonymously Honest Apprehensions; or, the unbiassed … Confession of Faith of a plain honest Lay-man.

== Other works ==
King's first separate work appeared in 1767 under the title of An Essay on the English Constitution and Government. In 1785 he circulated, also anonymously, Proposals for Establishing at Sea a Marine School, or Seminary for Seamen, in an open letter addressed to John Frere, vice-president of the Marine Society. Jonas Hanway, in a report made to the society in July of that year, had proposed a marine school on land. King brought up objections to this scheme, and suggested the fitting up a man-of-war as a school. Considerations on the Utility of the National Debt: and on the Present Alarming Crisis; with a Short Plan of a Mode of Relief was from 1793. There was a reply by John Acland.

== Family ==
As a circuit barrister King defended a lady from a faithless lover, and later married her.

== Notes ==
Attribution

This article incorporates text from a publication now in the public domain: Lee, Sidney, ed. (1892). "King, Edward (1735?-1807)". Dictionary of National Biography. Vol. 31. London: Smith, Elder & Co.
