= Theophilus Fortescue =

British Whig politician

Theophilus Fortescue (1707–1746), of Castle Hill, Filleigh, near Barnstaple, Devon, was a British Whig politician who sat in the House of Commons from 1727 to 1746.

Fortescue was the third son of Hugh Fortescue, MP of Filleigh and his first wife Bridget Boscawen, daughter of Hugh Boscawen of Tregothnan, Cornwall.

Fortescue was returned unopposed as an opposition Whig Member of Parliament for Barnstaple on his family's interest at the 1727 British general election. He voted against the Administration in almost every division. He was returned for Barnstaple unopposed again at the 1734 British general election. At the 1741 British general election he transferred to Devon where he was returned unopposed.

Fortescue died unmarried on 13 March 1746.

Parliament of Great Britain
Preceded by Lieutenant-General Thomas Whetham; Sir Hugh Acland	Member of Parliament for Barnstaple; 1727–1741; With: Richard Coffin 1727-1734; Sir John Chichester 1734-1740; John Basset 1740-1741	Succeeded by John Harris; Henry Rolle
Preceded by John Bampfylde; Henry Rolle	Member of Parliament for Devon; 1741–1746; With: Sir William Courtenay, Bt	Succeeded by Sir William Courtenay, Bt; Sir Thomas Dyke-Acland, Bt
