= Richard Coffin (1684–1766) =

British Whig politician

Richard Coffin (1684–1766) of Portledge, near Bideford, Devon was a British Whig politician who sat in the House of Commons between 1715 and 1734.

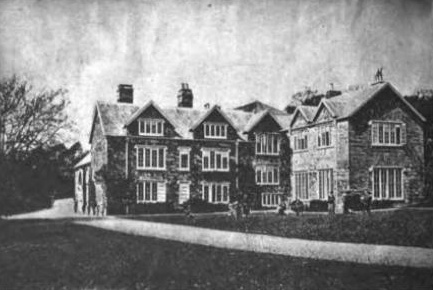
Portledge House

Coffin was baptized on. 23 July 1684, the fourth but only surviving son of Richard Coffin of Portledge and his third wife Anne Prideaux, daughter of Edmund Prideaux of Padstow, Cornwall. He succeeded his elder brother to the Portledge estate in 1703.

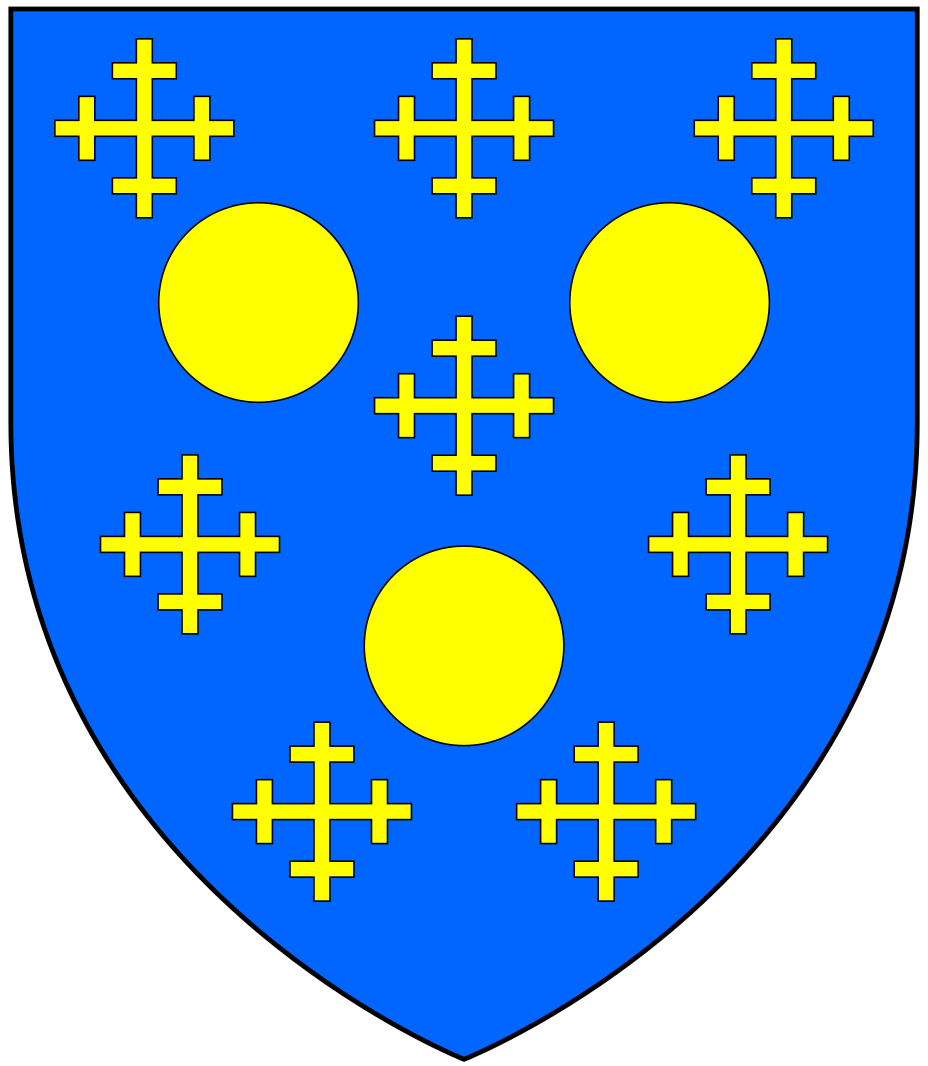
Arms of Coffin: Azure, three bezants between eight crosses crosslet or

Coffin was returned as a Whig Member of Parliament for Camelford at the 1715 British general election. He voted against the septennial bill, for the repeal of the Occasional Conformity and Schism Acts, and against the Peerage Bill. At the 1722 British general election he stood unsuccessfully at Barnstaple, but he was returned for it unopposed at the 1727 British general election on the interest of his friend John Rolle. He continued to vote against the Administration. He did not stand again in 1734.

Coffin died unmarried late in 1766 and was buried on 3 December 1766. He left Portledge to Richard and Robert Bennett, sons of his sister Honour.

Parliament of Great Britain
Preceded by Sir Bourchier Wrey; James Nicholls	Member of Parliament for Camelford; 1715–1722; With: James Montagu	Succeeded by The Earl of Drogheda; William Sloper
Preceded by Lieutenant-General Thomas Whetham; Sir Hugh Acland	Member of Parliament for Barnstaple; 1727–1734; With: Theophilus Fortescue	Succeeded by Sir John Chichester; Theophilus Fortescue
