= Sir Hugh Acland, 6th Baronet =

British landowner and politician

Sir Hugh Acland Bt
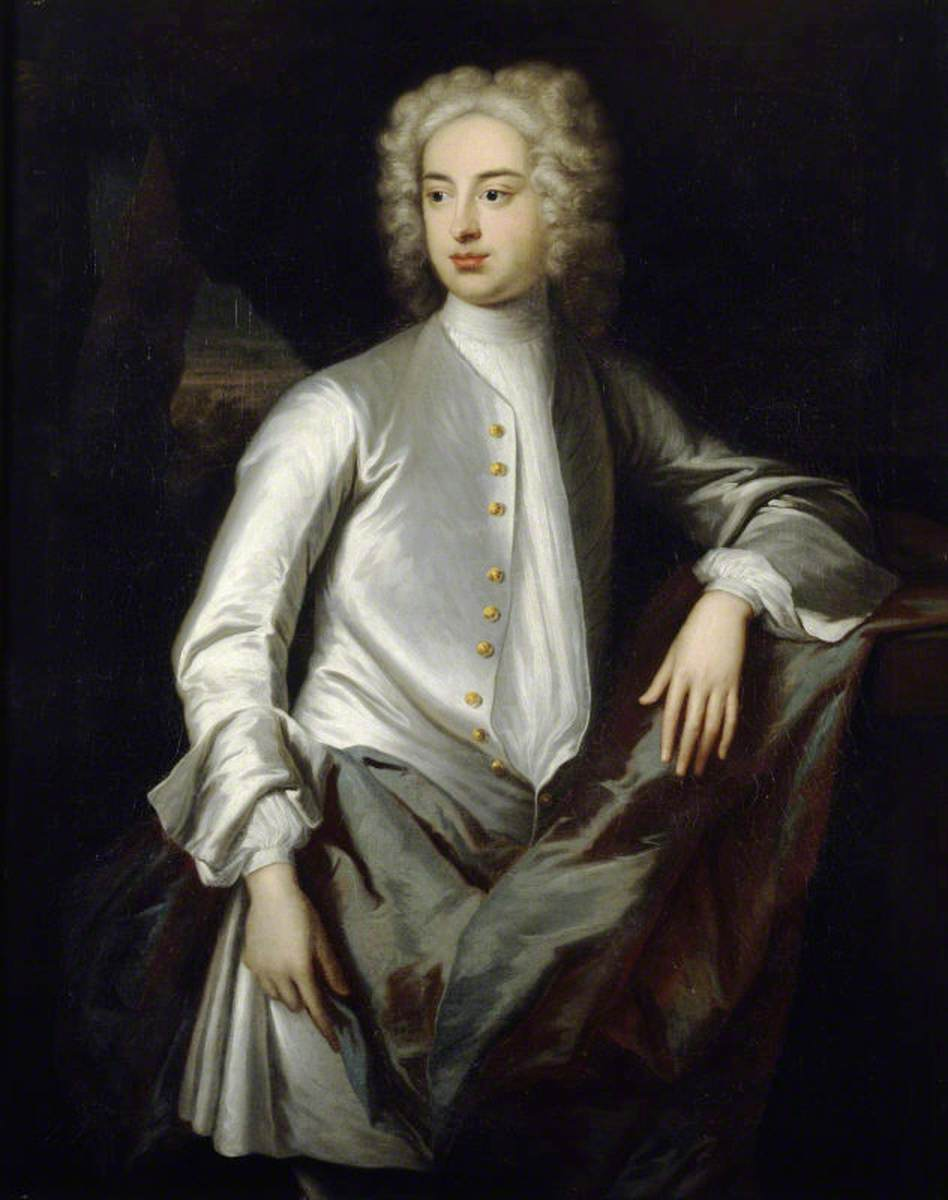
- Acland in 1720

Member of Parliament for Barnstaple
- In office 1721–1727 Serving with John Rolle (1721–1722); Thomas Whetham (1722–1727)
- Preceded by: John Basset; John Rolle
- Succeeded by: Richard Coffin; Theophilus Fortescue

Personal details
- Born: 26 January 1697
- Died: 29 July 1728 (aged 31)
- Education: Exeter College, Oxford

Sir Hugh Acland, 6th Baronet (26 January 1697 – 29 July 1728) of Killerton Devon was a British landowner and politician who sat in the House of Commons from 1721 to 1727.

== Early life ==
Acland was the eldest son of John Acland of Killerton and his wife Elizabeth Acland, daughter of Richard Acland of Barnstaple. His father died in 1703. He matriculated at Exeter College, Oxford on 9 June 1713. On 9 March 1714, he succeeded his paternal grandfather Sir Hugh Acland, 5th Baronet in the baronetcy and estates.

In May 1721, Acland married Cicely Wroth, eldest daughter and eventual sole heiress of Sir Thomas Wroth, 3rd Baronet (1674–1721), MP, of Petherton Park, Somerset, by his wife Mary Osbaldeston. Sir Thomas died on 27 June 1721, shortly after the marriage, and left Cicely his property and personal estate.

== Political career ==
Acland entered Parliament for Barnstaple in November 1721, standing as a Tory at an unopposed by-election following the death of John Basset. He owned considerable property in the area, home to his mother's branch of the family. At the 1722 election, Acland contested the two seats at Barnstaple with the Whig Major-General Thomas Whetham, opposition Whig Richard Coffin, and the Tory Sir Bourchier Wrey, 5th Baronet. Acland and Whetham were victorious. He did not stand in the 1727 election and died the following year.

== Death and legacy ==
Acland died on 29 July 1728. He and his wife Cicely had five children:

- Sir Thomas Dyke Acland, 7th Baronet (1722–1785) who succeeded in the baronetcy
- John Acland (1 January 1723/4 – 1729)
- Anne Acland (baptised 13 January 1724/5)
- Arthur Palmer Acland (baptised 9 July 1726 – 1771), matriculated at Balliol College, Oxford on 22 December 1744, married Elizabeth Oxenham and had issue, including Wroth Palmer Acland and John Palmer-Acland. He succeeded to the estates of his uncle's brother, Peregrine Palmer, at Fairfield, Stogursey in 1762
- Hugh Acland (baptised 28 November 1728 – June 1805), posthumous son, matriculated at Balliol on 16 December 1747

Parliament of Great Britain
Preceded by John Basset; John Rolle	Member of Parliament for Barnstaple; 1721–1727; With: John Rolle 1721–1722; Thomas Whetham 1722–1727	Succeeded by Richard Coffin; Theophilus Fortescue
Baronetage of England
Preceded by Hugh Acland	Baronet (of Columb John); 1714–1728	Succeeded by Thomas Dyke Acland
