= John Rolle (Devon MP, born 1626) =

English landowner

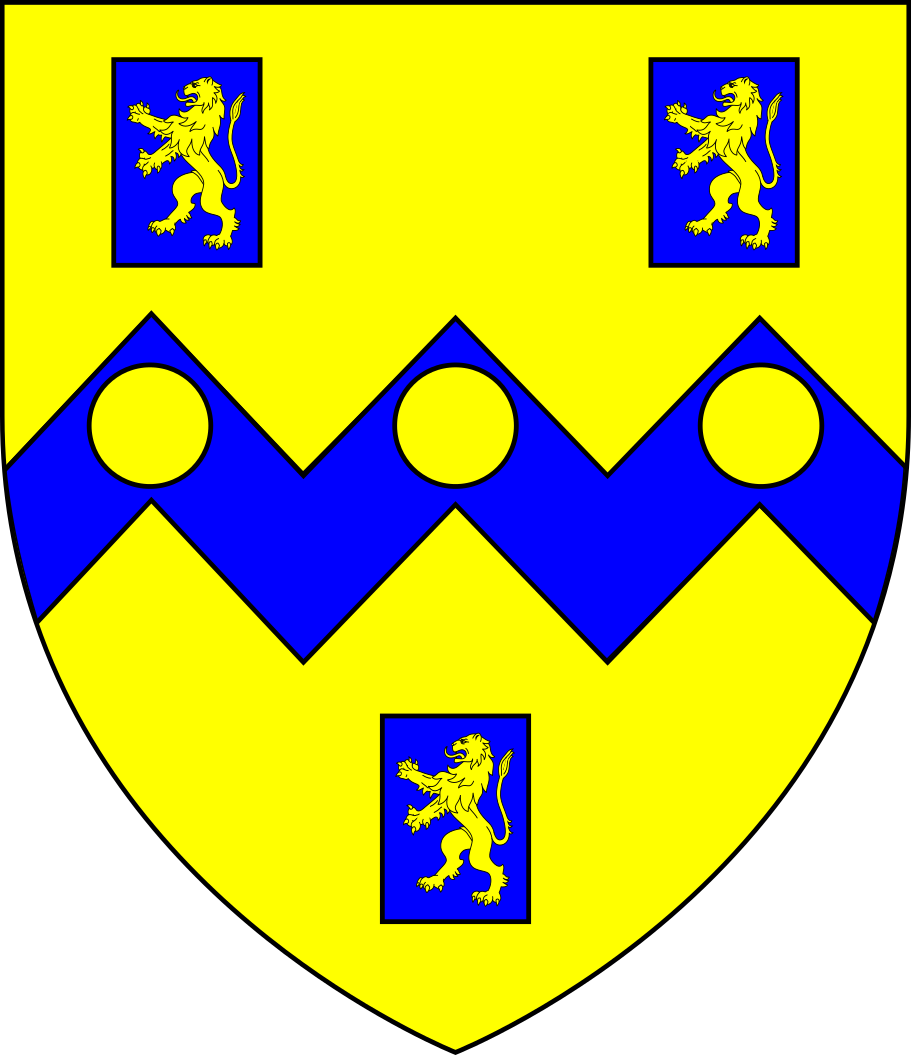
Arms of Rolle: Or, on a fesse dancetté between three billets azure each charged with a lion rampant of the first three bezants

Sir John Rolle (1626 – April 1706), KB, of Stevenstone, Devon, was an English landowner, Sheriff of Devon in 1682 and MP for Barnstaple (1660) and for Devon (1661–1679). The Travel Journal of Cosimo III de' Medici, Grand Duke of Tuscany (1642-1723) states of him: "This gentleman is one of the richest in the country, having an estate of six thousand pounds sterling per annum, besides a considerable property in ready money".

== Origins ==
John Rolle was baptised at Week St Mary, Cornwall, on 23 September 1626. He was the son of Andrew Rolle (d. 1628) of Marhayes (anciently Marrays, Marrais, Marrys etc.) in the parish of Week St Mary in Cornwall, six miles south of Bude, by his wife Grace Roberts. His grandfather was George II Rolle (d. 1573), the second son of the patriarch George Rolle (d. 1552), of Stevenstone, the founder of the Rolle families of Devon and Cornwall. George II Rolle had been left by his father's will the wardship and marriage, which he had purchased from her father, of Margaret Marhayes (or Marrays etc.), the daughter and sole heir of Edmund Marrys of "Marrys", i.e. Marhayes Manor, Week St Mary, Cornwall. The summarised text of his will concerning this bequest is as follows: He grants and bequeaths to George, his son, the wardship and marriage of Margaret Marrys, daughter and sole heir to Edmund Marrys, of the parish of St Mary Wyke in the county of Cornwall, in as ample manner as he had of the gift and grant of the said Edmund Marrys, paying yearly to the said Edmund £ ? during his life. George II duly married his inherited ward and thereby founded the cadet line of Rolle of Marhayes, which eventually itself became the senior line on the inheritance of Stevenstone and Bicton by Sir John Rolle (d. 1706), KB, the subject of the present article.

== Inheritance ==
In 1647 he inherited in tail-male the Devon manors of Stevenstone in the parish of St Giles in the Wood, near Great Torrington (23 miles east of Week St Mary) and Bicton, amongst many others, following the death of his second cousin Henry Rolle (1605-1647) of Beam, near Great Torrington, the last male descendant of John's great uncle John Rolle of Stevenstone (d. 1570), eldest son of the patriarch George Rolle (d. 1552), the founder of the Devon and Cornwall families. This inheritance made him possibly the largest landowner in Devon, a position certainly held in 1873 by his ultimate adoptive heir Hon. Mark Rolle (d. 1907), of Stevenstone, as revealed by the Return of Owners of Land survey.

== Career ==
In 1660 Rolle was elected Member of Parliament for Barnstaple in the Convention Parliament. He was created a Knight of the Bath at the coronation of Charles II. In 1661 he was elected MP for Devon for the Cavalier Parliament and held the seat until 1679. He was High Sheriff of Devon in 1682.

=== Entertains Grand Duke of Tuscany ===
On 7 April 1669 he entertained Cosimo III de' Medici, Grand Duke of Tuscany (1642-1723) at his Exeter townhouse "Abbot's Lodge". Rolle's wife was called Florence, one of the earliest (if not the first) such uses in England, which cannot have escaped the notice of the Grand Duke, whose capital was Florence in Tuscany. Abbot's Lodge (destroyed in 1942 during World War II bombing), was situated in Cathedral Close, and had been the former townhouse of the Abbot of Buckfast Abbey, and had been acquired in 1545 following the Dissolution of the Monasteries by the patriarch George Rolle (d. 1552), who called it "Buckfast Place" and died there in 1552. (Buckfast Abbey itself had been acquired by Sit Thomas Dennis of Holcombe Burnell, whose eventual heir was the Rolle family). The Grand Duke's visit, which commenced on 6 April 1669 was recorded by his travelling companion Lorenzo, Conte Magalotti (1637-1712) as follows:

Two miles from the city, after they had passed the bridge of Isca, called by the English Ex, several of the prominent gentlemen of the city came to meet and pay their respects to his highness, who, descending from his carriage, answered with his usual courtesy. When he reached the city, the people of which assembled in such numbers as to fill the suburbs and all the streets through which his highness passed, he alighted at the inn called the New Inn, where several gentlemen shortly arrived from the neighbouring places to pay their compliments to him. Soon after, the mayor, aldermen, and bailiffs, unexpectedly arrived in their magisterial habits of ceremony, with the insignia of justice and mace-bearers before them; they found his highness up-stairs in the saloon, who, after having received them graciously, and desired the mayor to be covered, heard, and replied to, his congratulations. He requested his highness to be allowed to give him a public entertainment at his own house, which invitation his highness refused, on the plea of his being incog., a plea he had made use of elsewhere; and, above all, on account of the haste in which he was, from his impatience to be in London and kiss the hands of his majesty the king. After they were gone, Sir Arthur Ackland came in, a young man of seventeen years of age, who, by the death of his father, is come into possession of a fortune of two thousand pounds per annum. Also Messrs. John and Dennis Rolle, sons of Sir John Rolle, one of the two lieutenants-general of the county under the general. This gentleman is one of the richest in the country, having an estate of six thousand pounds sterling per annum, besides a considerable property in ready money, which will enable him to give a reasonable fortune to his younger sons. With him the day ended".

On the next day, the 7th, having attended a service in Exeter Cathedral, the Grand Duke:

"went to see the ancient castle, and then making a tour round the walls of the city on the outside, he returned home to dinner, entertaining at table, besides the usual gentlemen, Colonel Gascoyne, the two brothers Rolle, Mr. Ford, one of the two lieutenants of the county, lately appointed secretary to Lord Robert, for the purpose of accompanying him to Ireland, and Major Andrews. After dinner, Mr. Kirkam, who is the only Catholic gentleman in the county, came to pay his respects to his highness, and soon afterwards, Sir John Rolle, who came from his house in the country, on purpose to pay his obeisance. After their departure, his highness went to Sir John Rolle's house, to visit his wife, who received him in a room where were assembled, along with her, her three daughters; Miss Earl, sister of a rich gentleman of the county, who, they said, was to be the wife of the eldest son of Sir John above-mentioned; and three sisters of Mr. Kirkam, who were unmarried, and Catholics, cousins on the mother's side to Sir John Rolle. His highness conversed standing, and on taking leave, returned directly home, and passed the evening without any other occurrence worth mentioning".

== Marriage ==
In 1648, he married his cousin, Florence Rolle (1631-1705), whose mural monument exists in Tawstock Church, the only surviving child of Denys Rolle (1614–1638) of Stevenstone and Bicton, by his wife Margaret Paulet, daughter of John Paulet, 5th Marquess of Winchester (c. 1598-1675).

The heir-male of Denys Rolle had been his cousin Henry Rolle of Beam (d. 1647) who had married Mary Stevens, daughter of Mr Stevens of Vielstone in the parish of Buckland Brewer, the lordship of which latter manor belonged to the Rolles of Stevenstone. Henry Rolle had died childless, his heir thus having become John Rolle (d. 1706) the subject of the present article. The Rolle family inter-married further with the Stevens family, which were later of Winscott House in the parish of Peters Marland, Devon, and a Stevens was briefly heir apparent to the vast estates of John Rolle, 1st Baron Rolle (d. 1842), the last of the Rolles.

== Mural monument to wife ==
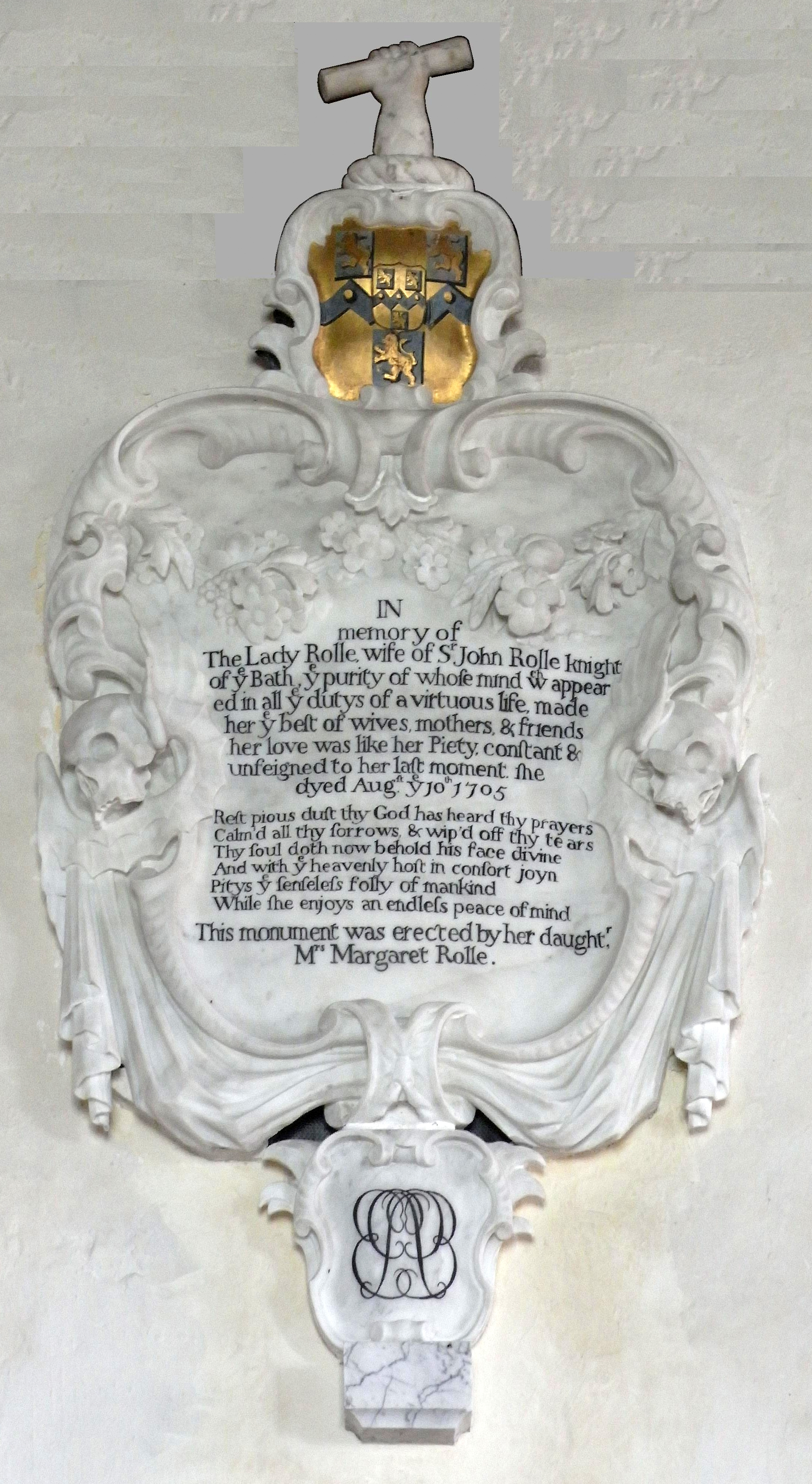
Mural monument to Florence Rolle (d. 1705), daughter and sole heiress of Denys Rolle (1614–1638) of Stevenstone and wife of Sir John Rolle (d. 1706) of Marhayes. Tawstock Church, Devon. The arms are Rolle of Marhayes with inescutcheon of pretence of Rolle of Stevenstone

A mural monument exists in St Peter's Church, Tawstock (by Thomas Jewell of Barnstaple) to Florence Rolle (d. 1705), daughter and sole heiress of Denys Rolle (1614–1638) of Stevenstone and wife of Sir John Rolle (d. 1706) of Marhayes. It was erected by her daughter Margaret Rolle, a spinster who had apparently moved to Tawstock Court, the home of her sister Florence Rolle (Lady Wrey), the widow of Sir Bourchier Wrey, 4th Baronet (d. 1696). The inscription is as follows:

"In memory of The Lady Rolle wife of Sr. John Rolle, Knight of ye Bath, ye purity of whose mind, w(hi)ch appeared in all ye dutys of a virtuous life, made her ye best of wives, mothers & friends. Her love was like her piety, constant & unfeigned to her last moment. She dyed Aug(u)st ye 10th 1705.
Rest pious dust thy God has heard thy prayers,
Calm'd all thy sorrows & wip'd off thy tears,
Thy soul doth now behold his face divine,
And with ye heavenly host in confort joyn,
Pitys ye senseless folly of mankind,
While she enjoys an endless peace of mind.
This monument was erected by her daught(e)r M(ist)r(es)s Margaret Rolle".

On top of the monument is an heraldic cartouche showing the arms of Sir John Rolle, namely Rolle of Marhayes with an inescutcheon of pretence of Rolle of Stevenstone, indicating that Sir John's wife was an heraldic heiress. Above that is the crest of Rolle: A cubit arm erect vested or charged with a fess indented double cotised azure in the hand a parchment roll . At the base is a monogram of undeciphered lettering, apparently a doubled and interlaced "R".

== Children ==
By Florence Rolle he had the following children:

- John Rolle (d. 1689), eldest son, who predeceased his father. He married Lady Christiana Bruce, daughter of Robert Bruce, 1st Earl of Ailesbury and 2nd Earl of Elgin (c.1626-1685). He was survived by two sons, successively heirs to their grandfather, Robert Rolle (d. 1710), MP, of Stevenstone, who died childless and was succeeded by his younger brother John Rolle (1679-1730), MP, of Stevenstone.
- Amos Rolle, who married Mary Risdon, only child of William Risdon of Winscott, in the parish of St Giles in the Wood.
- Col. Dennis Rolle (d. 1714), of Horwood in Devon, whose grave slab exists to the south of the altar in the north aisle chapel of Horwood Church.
- Charles Rolle
- Margaret Rolle, spinster, died after 1705 when she erected the monument to her mother in Tawstock Church. Stated apparently erroneously in the Heraldic Visitations of Devon (1895, edited by Vivian) to have died in 1677.
- Florence Rolle, married in 1681 to Sir Bourchier Wrey, 4th Baronet (1653-1696), of Tawstock.

== Death and burial ==
Rolle died at the age of 79 and was buried at St Giles in the Wood on 1 May 1706. At the time of his death he owned over forty manors in Devon and estates in Cornwall, Somerset and Northamptonshire.

== Sources ==
- Ferris, John P., biography of Sir John Rolle published in History of Parliament: House of Commons 1660-1690, ed. B.D. Henning, 1983
- Vivian, Lt.Col. J.L., The Visitations of the County of Devon, Exeter, 1895, pp. 652–656, Rolle of Stevenstone

Parliament of England
Preceded by Philip Skippon; John Dodderidge	Member of Parliament for Barnstaple; 1660; With: Nicholas Dennys	Succeeded by Sir John Chichester; Nicholas Dennys
Preceded by Sir John Northcote, 1st Baronet; Sir Edward Seymour, 3rd Baronet	Member of Parliament for Devon; 1661–1679; With: Sir Hugh Pollard, 2nd Baronet 1661–1667; Earl of Torrington 1667–1671; Sir Coplestone Bampfylde, 2nd Baronet 1671–1679	Succeeded by Sir Edward Seymour, 4th Baronet; Sir William Courtenay, 1st Baronet
