= Chichester baronets =

There have been three baronetcies created for persons with the surname Chichester, one in the Baronetage of England and two in the Baronetage of the United Kingdom. Only the 1641 creation is extant as of 2026.

- Chichester baronets of Raleigh (1641)
- Chichester baronets of Green Castle (1821): see Sir Arthur Chichester, 1st Baronet
- Chichester baronets of Arlington Court (1840)
