= Rosalie Chichester =

British landowner and photographer (1865–1949)

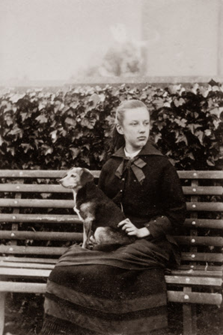
- Born: 29 November 1865; Arlington Court
- Died: 17 January 1949 (aged 83); Woolacombe, Devon
- Parent(s): Sir Alexander Chichester, 2nd Baronet; Rosalie Amelia Chamberlayne

Rosalie Chichester (29 November 1865 – 17 January 1949) was a British landowner, writer, photographer, artist and collector. She bequeathed all of her property to the National Trust.

== Early life ==
Rosalie Caroline Chichester was born in Arlington Court in Devon on 29 November 1865. She was the daughter of Sir Alexander Palmer Bruce Chichester, 2nd Baronet, and Rosalie Amelia Chamberlayne. After her father's death, her mother married his distant cousin, Sir Arthur Chichester, 8th Baronet.

Her paternal grandfather Sir John Chichester was the MP for Barnstaple in 1831. Her maternal grandfather was Thomas Chamberlayne of Cranbury Park. Among her maternal family were uncle, Tankerville Chamberlayne, was a prominent MP, and aunts Francesca Maria Chamberlayne (wife of Cecil Howard, 6th Earl of Wicklow) and Agnes Caroline Chamberlayne (wife of Lt.-Col. George Charles Keppel Johnstone, a son of Sir Frederick Johnstone, Bt).

Chichester was educated at home by a governess and was trained in etiquette and genealogy. Chichester was presented as a debutante in 1885. Despite this and her sizable estate, Chichester never married. She gave her time and support to the local charities and events and held positions in a number of local clubs. Her father died in 1881 when she was sixteen, leaving the family in serious debt. Chichester inherited the estate in 1886 and finally managed to pay off the debts by 1928.

== Career ==
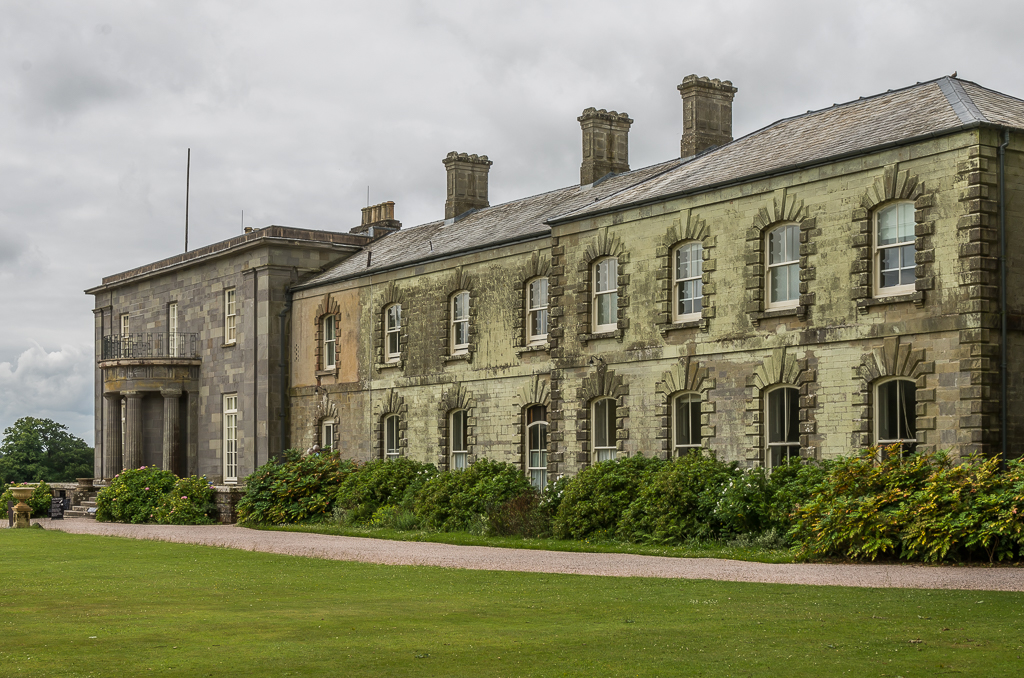
Arlington Court

Chichester was a member of the Primrose League from 1885 to 1890. She was also involved with botany and photography. She took and processed photos of the tenants of the estate and won awards for her photography. She was also a competent artist and has left a number of pieces which are on display in her home. A supporter of wildlife, Chichester's land was a sanctuary against hunting and shooting. From her travels, Chichester wrote articles for the North Devon Journal and the Daily Sketch. Chichester's paid companion from 1912 until World War II was a Miss Chrissie Peters. The First World War saw Chichester on the Devon War Agricultural Appeal Tribunal as well as supporting the Women's Land Army. Chichester joined the suffrage movement in 1913 but was opposed to violent actions.

Chichester believed in the National Trust and gave Morte Point, Devon to them by 1911. She left the intact Arlington Court estate to the trust when she died on 17 January 1949 in Parade House, Woolacombe, Devon.
