= Sherwell =

Sherwell may refer to:

- Percy Sherwell (1880–1948), cricketer
- Russell Sherwell (born 1960), water polo player
- Thomas Sherwell, executed in 1578 in Lima along with John Oxenham

== See also ==
- Shirwell, a village, civil parish and former manor in the local government district of North Devon, in the county of Devon, England.
