= Sir John Chichester, 1st Baronet =

English landowner and politician

Arms of Chichester: Chequy or and gules, a chief vair

Sir John Chichester, 1st Baronet (23 April 1623 – 4 November 1667) lord of the manor of Raleigh in the parish of Pilton in Devon, was an English landowner and politician who sat in the House of Commons from 1661 to 1667.

== Origins ==
He was the son and heir of Sir Robert Chichester (d.1627), K.B., of Raleigh, Devon by his second wife Mary Hill, a daughter of Robert Hill (d.1637) of Shilston in the parish of Modbury in Devon.

== Career ==
He succeeded to Raleigh on the death of his father on 24 April 1627. He was created a baronet on 4 August 1641. In 1661 Chichester was elected a Member of Parliament for Barnstaple (adjacent to Raleigh) in the Cavalier Parliament and sat until his death in 1667 at the age of about 44.

== Marriages and children ==
Chichester married twice:

- Firstly to Elizabeth Rayney (d.1654), a daughter of Sir John Rayney, 1st Baronet (1601–1661) of Wrotham in Kent, by his first wife Catharine Style, a daughter of Thomas Style. By his first wife he had children including:
  - Sir John Chichester, 2nd Baronet (c. 1658-16 September 1680)
  - Sir Arthur Chichester, 3rd Baronet (c. 1662-3 February 1718), (Since his first wife died in 1654 this has to be an error. Burke's Peerage says has first wife Elizabeth died without issue, suggesting that sons John and Arthur are both children of Mary Colley (as BP states).)
  - Henry
- Secondly to Mary Colly, a daughter of Theodore Colly and widow of George Warcup, a merchant of the City of London. She is recorded as a widow, in the parish of St. Anne's, Blackfriars, on 18 July 1655.

Parliament of England
Preceded by John Rolle; Nicholas Dennys	Member of Parliament for Barnstaple; 1661–1667; With: Nicholas Dennys	Succeeded by Nicholas Dennys; Sir John Northcote
Baronetage of England
New creation	Baronet (of Raleigh); 1641–1667	Succeeded by John Chichester
