= Woolleigh, Beaford =

Historic estate in Devon, England

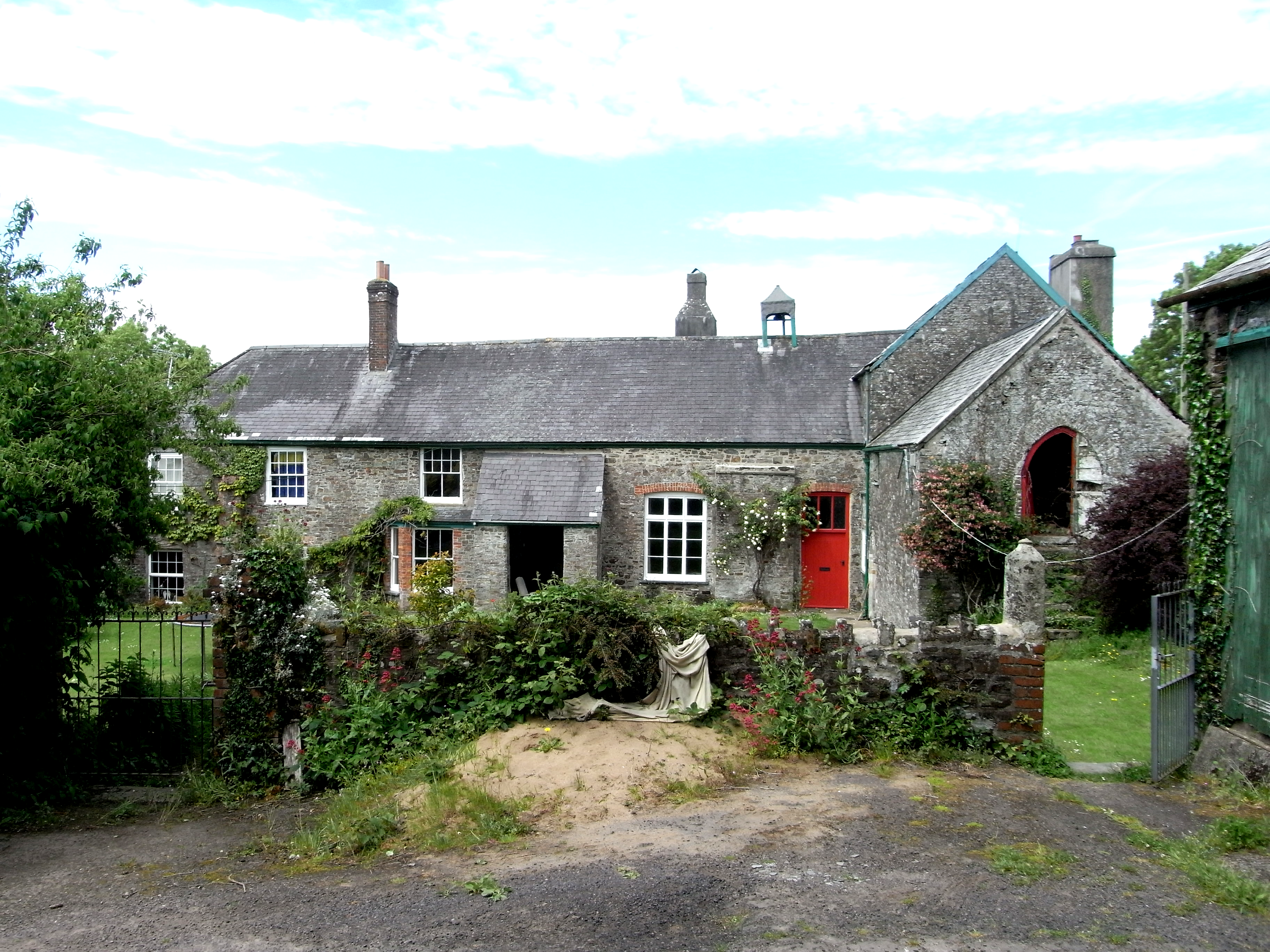
Woolleigh Barton in 2015

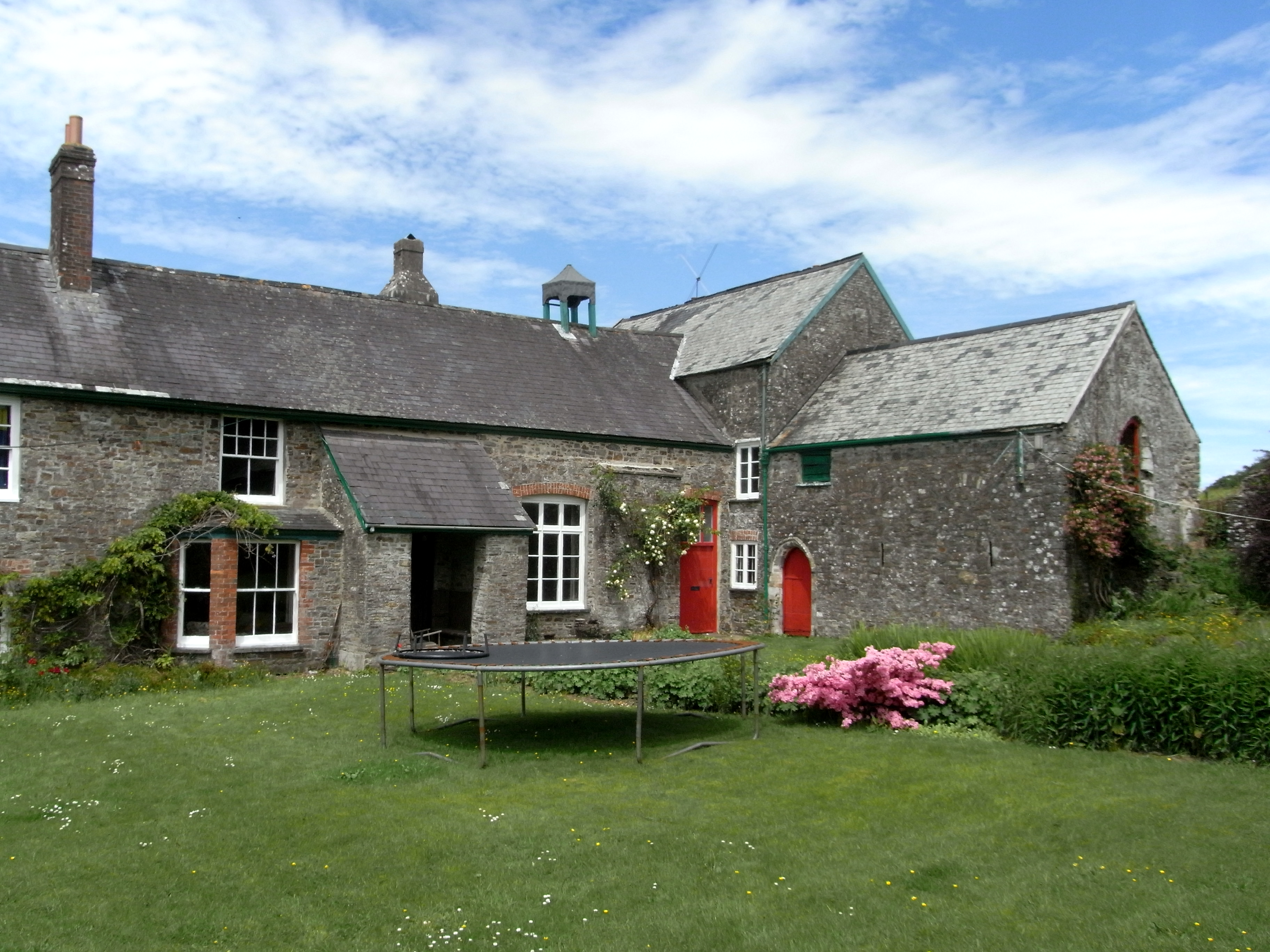
Woolleigh Barton in 2015, chapel at right

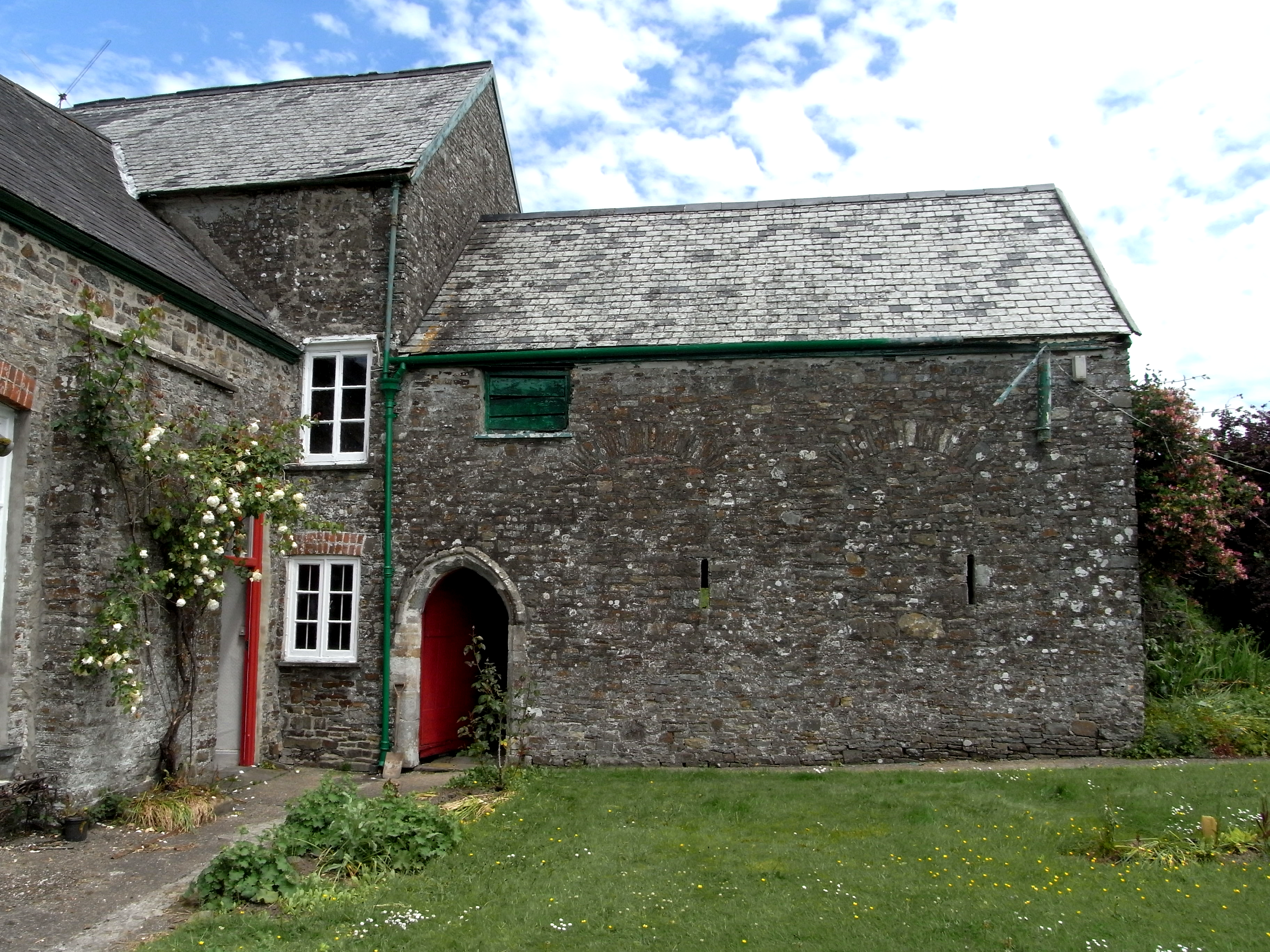
Chapel at Woolleigh Barton in 2015

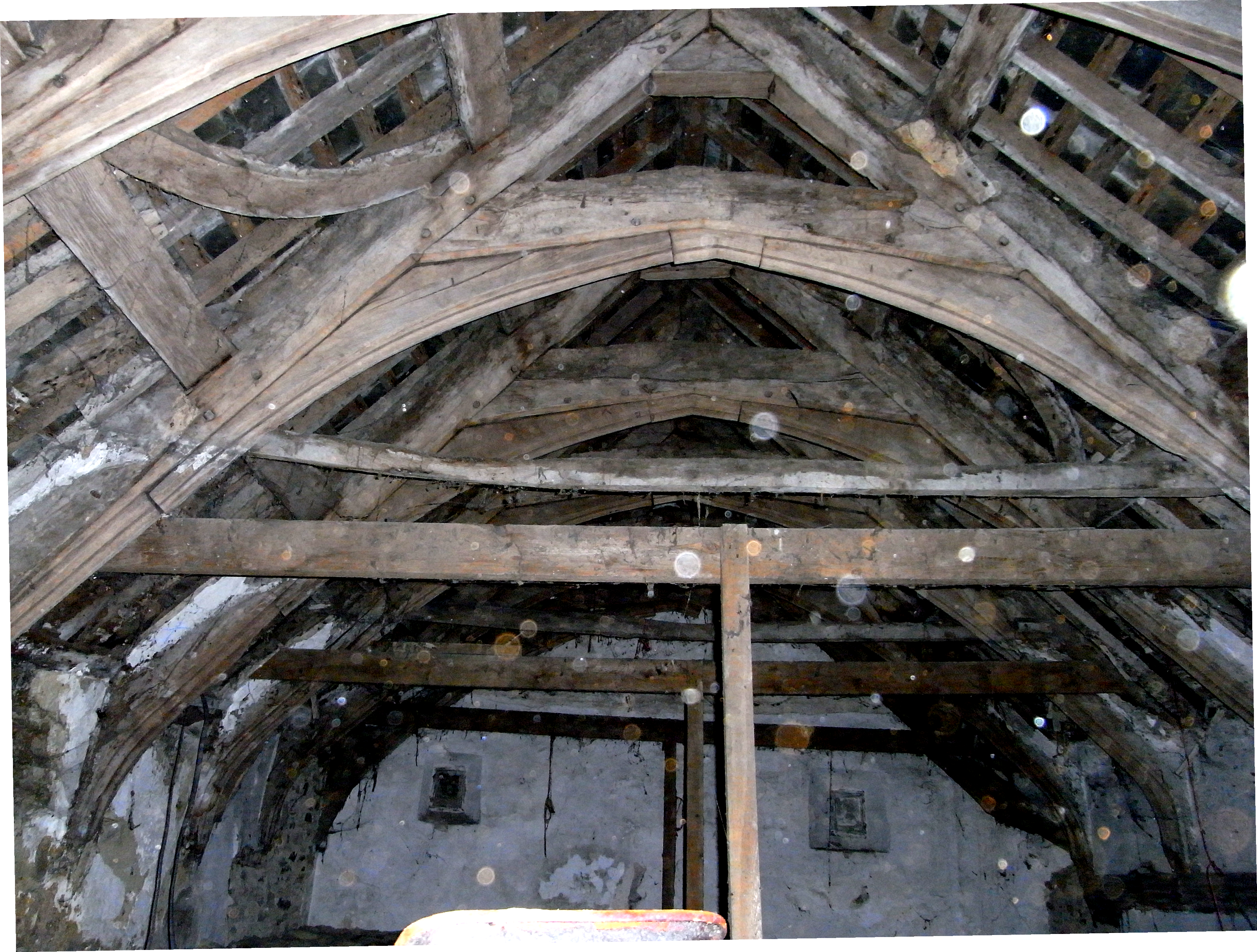
Ancient roof timbers at Woolleigh Barton

Woolleigh (anciently Woolley, Wollegh, etc.) is an historic estate in the parish of Beaford, Devon. The surviving mansion house known as Woolleigh Barton, situated 1 3/4 miles north-west of the parish church of Beaford, is a grade II* listed building, long used as a farmhouse. It incorporates remains of a "very fine example of a late Medieval manor house" and retains a "very rich" 15th century wagon roof, a garderobe with the original door, and an attached private chapel with a 17th-century roof.

== Chapel of St Mary ==
The private Chapel attached to the mansion house was dedicated to St Mary. The earliest surviving record of it is in the registers of the Bishops of Exeter for 1321 when it was licensed to Master William de Wolleghe, Rector of Yarnscombe. He was permitted by the licence to say mass therein but was forbidden from administering the sacraments there and was obliged to attend the parish church on Sundays and Feast Days. Mention of it is made later in the registers of Bishop Stafford in 1400 and of Bishop Lacy in 1426, in which latter year a licence was granted to John and Elizabeth Haache (i.e. Hatch) who at the same time were also licensed for their private chapel of St Andrew at Hele (now Great Hele Barton) in South Molton.

== Descent ==
=== Domesday Book ===
Uluelie (Woolleigh) is listed in the Domesday Book of 1086 as the 41st of the 176 Devonshire holdings of Baldwin de Moels (died 1090), Sheriff of Devon, feudal baron of Okehampton, one of the Devon Domesday Book tenants-in-chief of William the Conqueror. His tenant was Colwin. Before the Norman Conquest of 1066 it had been held by the Anglo-Saxon Alsi. Woolleigh was thus a member of the feudal barony of Okehampton, whose later barons were the Courtenay Earls of Devon of Tiverton Castle. The descent of Woolleigh was as follows:

=== Murdake ===
The holder of Woolleigh first recorded by Risdon (died 1640) was the Murdake family of Compton Murdake in Warwickshire, "where Thomas Murdake dwelt". Risdon asserts that a member of this family was Henry Murdac (died 1153), Archbishop of York.

Sir Thomas Murdack
Sir Thomas Murdack of Woolleigh and of Compton Murdake in Warwickshire, died without male children leaving a daughter and heiress Wenlian Murdack, who married Thomas Hatch of Hatch in the parish of South Molton, Devon.

=== Hatch ===
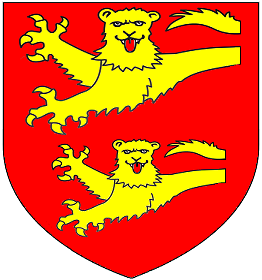
Arms of Hatch: Gules, two demi-lions passant guardant in pale or

The family of de Hatch succeeded Murdake at Woolleigh. The de Hatch family descended from Robert Atwater, son of William Atwater of South Molton, Devon, by his wife Jone de Wolrington, daughter and heiress of William de Wolrington of Hatch (alias Hach, Hacche, etc.) in the parish of South Molton. According to Risdon, Hatch was the "lord of the royalty" of South Molton, thus the principal estate within that royal manor and borough. The Wolringtons were themselves heirs of the original de Hatch family, which died out in the male line. On receiving his maternal inheritance Robert Atwater adopted the surname de Hatch, or Hatch. Robert's son was Thomas Hatch, who married Mabill Leigh, daughter and heiress of Thomas Leigh of Leigh, near Tiverton.

Robert Hatch
Son and heir of Thomas Hatch and Mabill Leigh. He married Wenlian Murdack, daughter and heiress of Sir Thomas Murdack of Woolleigh and of Compton Murdake in Warwickshire,
Robert Hatch
Son and heir, who married a certain Blanch.
John Hatch
Son, who married Elizabeth Dirwyn, daughter and heiress of William Dirwyn of Fulford in the parish of Crediton, Devon. It was presumably this John and Elizabeth Haache who were licensed in 1426 by Edmund Lacey, Bishop of Exeter, to have private chapels at Woolleigh and at Hele (now Great Hele Barton) in South Molton.
John Hatch
Son, who married Elizabeth Gorges, daughter of Sir Edward Gorges, lord of the manor of Wraxall in Somerset.
Thomas Hatch
Son, who married Alis Basset, a daughter of Sir John Basset (1441–1485) of Tehidy in Cornwall and of Whitechapel in the parish of Bishops Nympton, by his wife Elizabeth Budockshyde. Whitechapel is close to Hatch. Sir John Basset was the son and heir of John Basset (1374–1463) by his wife Joan Beaumont, daughter of Sir Thomas Beaumont of Umberleigh and Heanton Punchardon and sister and heiress of Philip Beaumont of Shirwell. The Beaumonts had inherited Umberleigh from the Poulton family who had inherited it from the Willingtons. The Basset family were amongst the early Norman settlers in England. Alis Basset's brother was Sir John Basset (1462–1528), KB, of Tehidy in Cornwall and Umberleigh in Devon, Sheriff of Cornwall in 1497, 1517 and 1522 and Sheriff of Devon in 1524. Although himself an important figure in the Westcountry gentry, Sir John Basset is chiefly remembered for his connection with the life of his second wife and widow Honor Grenville (died 1566), who moved into the highest society when she remarried to Arthur Plantagenet, 1st Viscount Lisle KG (died 1542), an illegitimate son of King Edward IV, and an important figure at the court of King Henry VIII, his nephew. The marriage of Thomas Hatch and Alis Basset was without male children and produced a daughter and heiress Anne Hatch, the wife of Baldwin Mallet, to whom passed the estate of Hatch and Woolleigh.

=== Mallet ===
Arms of Mallet: Azure, three escallops or

Sir Baldwin Mallet of St. Audries in Somerset
He married (as his second wife) Anne Hatch, heiress of Woolleigh and Hatch. He was Solicitor General to King Henry VIII and was the second son of Thomas Mallet (died 1502) of Enmore in Somerset and of Deandon (alias Dewdon) in the parish of Widdecombe in Devon, by his wife Joan Wadham, a daughter of Sir William Wadham (died 1452) of Edge in the parish of Branscombe in Devon and of Merryfield in the parish of Ilton, near Ilminster, Somerset, Sheriff of Devon in 1442. Sir Baldwin Mallet inherited from his father the manor of Quantockshead, commonly called St. Audries, in Somerset. Sir Baldwin Mallet's first wife Jone Tacle was the daughter and heiress of John Tacle of Honiton in Devon. John Tacle was "a person of property, versed in the law", who is memorialized by the following inscription surviving in 1793 on two pillars in the chancel of Honiton Church: "Pray for the soul of John Takell, and Jone hys wyffe", with a mill rind sable between. By Joan Tacle he had a son and heir Michael Mallet who inherited St Audries from his father and was the ancestor of the Malet baronets of Wilbury in Wiltshire, created in 1791. Anne Hatch survived her husband and married Sir Hugh Trevanyon.

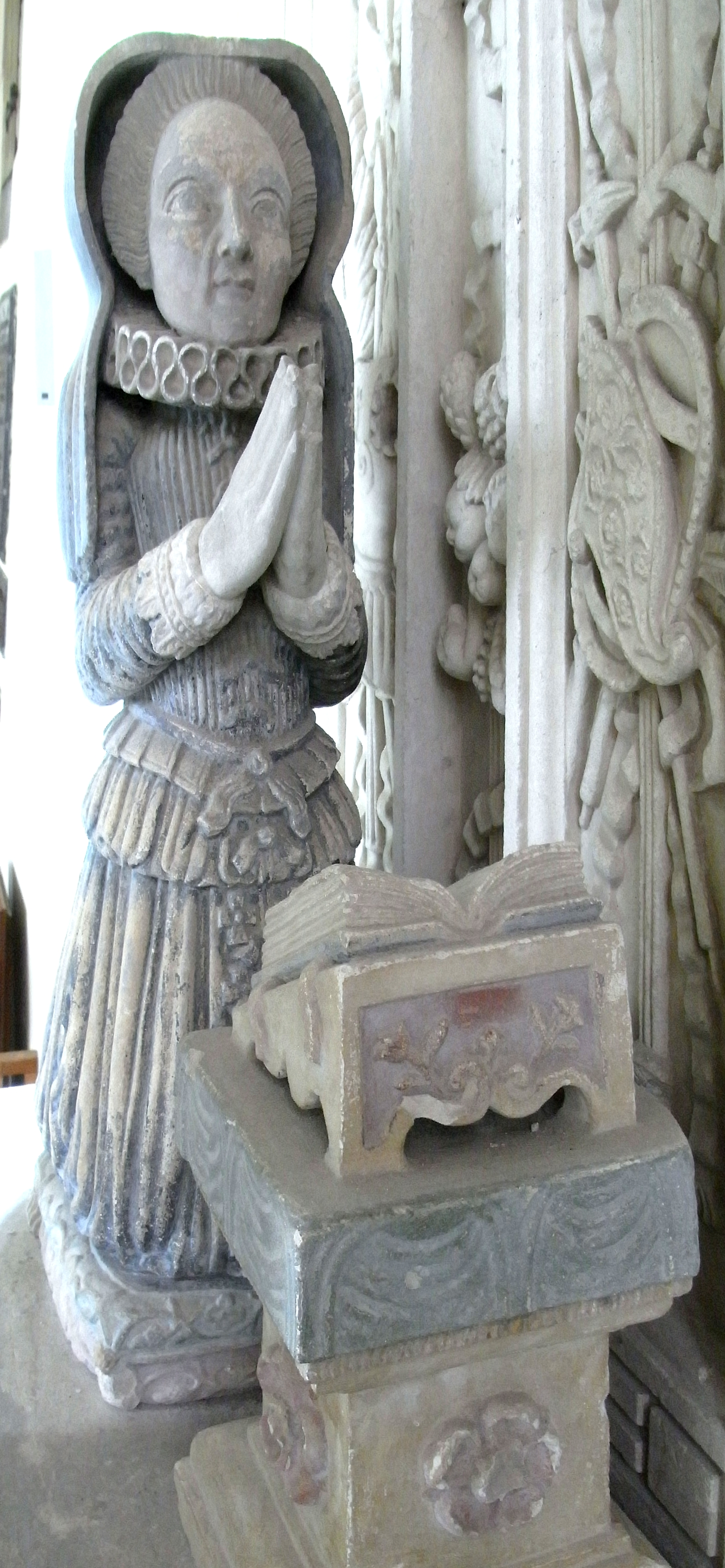
Small kneeling effigy of Elizabeth Rolle, widow of Robert Mallet of Woolleigh, on monument to her 2nd husband Sir John Acland (died 1620) of Columb John, in Broadclyst Church, Devon

John Mallet (died 1570) of Woolleigh
He was the eldest son and heir by his father's second wife Anne Hatch, Sheriff of Devon in 1562 and a Member of Parliament for Plymouth in April 1554 and for Bodmin in 1562 and 1563–7. He married Alice Monck, a daughter of Anthony Monck (died 1545) (son of Humphry Monck) of Potheridge (directly across the River Torridge from Woolleigh) in the parish of Merton, Devon (or according to Pole he married Margaret Monck, daughter of Humphrey Monck). Anthony Monck was the great-great-grandfather of George Monck, 1st Duke of Albemarle (1608–1670), of Potheridge. Alice Monck's brother was Thomas Monck (died 1583), who married Frances Plantagenet, daughter of Arthur Plantagenet, 1st Viscount Lisle KG (died 1542), by his wife Honor Grenville (died 1566), widow of John Basset (1462–1528), whose sister Alis Basset married Thomas Hatch of Woolleigh (see above). One of the daughters of Thomas Monck and Frances Plantagenet was Margaret Monck, who married Hugh Acland (1543–1622) and was the mother of Sir Arthur Acland (died 1610) who married Eleanor Mallet (1573–1645), heiress of Woolleigh (see below).

Robert Mallet
Son and heir, who married Elizabeth Rolle, a daughter of George Rolle (c. 1486 – 1552) of Stevenstone, near Great Torrington in Devon, the founder of the wealthy, influential and widespread Rolle family of Devon. Elizabeth Rolle survived her husband and married secondly, as his first wife, to Sir John Acland (died 1620) of Columb John, Broadclyst, Devon, but produced no surviving children. A small kneeling figure representing Elizabeth Rolle survives on the monument with effigy to her 2nd husband in St John's Church, Broadclyst.

John Mallet
Son, who died without children, when his co-heiresses became his sisters, of whom one, the heiress of Woolleigh, was Eleanor Mallet (1573–1645), who married her step-first cousin (her mother's nephew by marriage) Sir Arthur Acland (died 1610) of Acland in the parish of Landkey, Devon. Eleanor's mother was Elizabeth Rolle, who remarried to Sir John Acland (died 1620) of Columb John, Sir Arthur's uncle. Eleanor survived Sir Arthur and remarried to Sir Francis Vincent, 1st Baronet (c. 1568 – 1640) of Stoke d'Abernon, in Surrey.

=== Acland ===
Arms of Acland: Chequy argent and sable, a fesse gules

Woolleigh remained in the Acland family for many generations, following the descent of Killerton. The Aclands soon abandoned their original seat of Acland and in 1622 Sir John Acland, 1st Baronet (1591–1647), son of Sir Arthur Acland and Eleanor Mallet, moved definitively to Columb John, which he had inherited from his great-uncle Sir John Acland (died 1620), and left Acland as a residence for younger branches. Sir Hugh Acland, 5th Baronet (died 1714), 4th son of the 1st baronet, abandoned Columb John for adjoining Killerton. After that Woolleigh appears to have been used as a residence of elder sons and heirs apparent whilst their fathers were still alive and living at Killerton. Thus John Acland (died 1703), the son and heir apparent of Sir Hugh Acland, 5th Baronet (died 1714) lived at Woolleigh, but predeceased his father so never inherited Killerton.

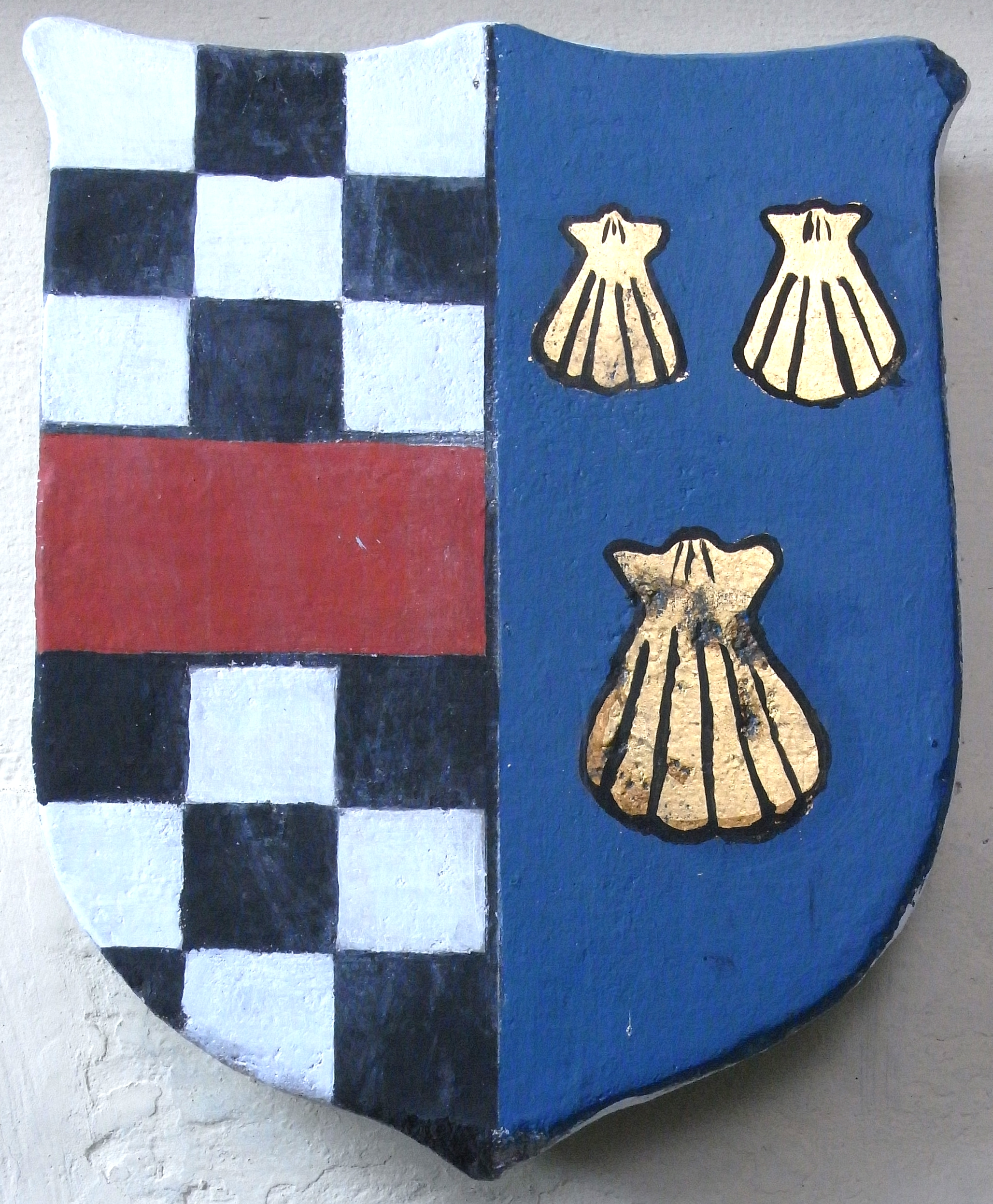
Escutcheon showing arms of Acland impaling Mallet. Detail from monument to Sir Arthur Acland (died 1610) in Landkey Church

Sir Arthur Acland (died 1610)
Little is known about his life and career, but his impressive monument with effigy and inscription survives in the Acland Aisle in Landkey Church. He married his step-first cousin Eleanor Mallet (1573–1645) a daughter and co-heiress of Robert Mallet of Wooleigh.

Sir John Acland, 1st Baronet (died 1647) of Acland
Son, who abandoned the ancient family seat of Acland in favour of Columb John, which he had inherited from his great-uncle Sir John Acland (died 1620). He purchased the estate of Killerton, adjoining Columb John, as a jointure for his widowed mother Eleanor Mallet, who lived there with her second husband Sir Francis Vincent. John Acland was a Royalist commander in the Civil War. He was fined heavily for his delinquency, a sum equivalent to 1/10th of the value of his estates. Upon his death in 1647, he was succeeded by his eldest son Sir Francis Acland, 2nd Baronet (died 1648).

Sir Francis Acland, 2nd Baronet (died 1648)
Eldest son, who survived his father only a short time. He died unmarried and was buried at Stoke D'Abernon in Surrey, the former St Vincent manor, and his ledger stone survives in that church.

Sir John Acland, 3rd Baronet (died 1655)
Younger brother. In 1654, he married Margaret Rolle, daughter of Denys Rolle (1614–1638) of Stevenstone.

Sir Arthur Acland, 4th Baronet (1655–1672)
Only son and heir who died as a minor in 1672, unmarried, and was succeeded by his uncle Hugh.

Sir Hugh Acland, 5th Baronet (died 1714)
Uncle, who demolished the mansion house at Columb John and made adjacent Killerton his principal seat, which house he enlarged, possibly using some of the stonework from Columb John. He married Anne Daniel, daughter of Sir Thomas Daniel of Beswick Hall in Yorkshire. His eldest son and heir apparent was John Acland (died 1703), who lived at Woolleigh, but predeceased his father so never inherited Killerton. John's son was Sir Hugh Acland, 6th Baronet (1697–1728).

=== Leverton ===
The last tenants of Woolleigh under the Aclands were the Leverton family who farmed at Woolleigh:

William Leverton (1809–1872)
Baptised 29 Jun 1809, Alverdiscott, Devon, and died 21 Nov 1872 at Woolleigh. He was a yeoman farmer, who married Hannah Hooper (1806-15 Dec 1877), who was born at Dowland in Devon, only daughter of Henry Hooper of Beaford. In the 1851 census he was resident at Woolleigh and farming 560 acres and employing 12 men. In 1857 he also held land at Blinsham in the parish of Beaford. By 1861 he was farming only 400 acres but was employing 9 labourers and 6 boys. In 1871 his acreage had reduced to 300 but he was employing 8 labourers and 8 workmen. In 1856 he was elected Chairman of the Torrington Association for the Protection of Property. He had two children, Lucy Hannah, who married Christopher Norman of St.Giles in the Wood, Devon and William, son and heir, who inherited from his mother her leasehold tenement in Dowland called Lower Upeost
William Leverton (1848–1925)
Son, a farmer. In 1902 Woolleigh still belonged to the Aclands, in the person of Sir C. T. Dyke Acland, Bart, and comprised between 400 and 500 acres. In 1878 at Roborough he married Elizabeth Ann Wadland (died 1887). Their eldest son, William Henry (1879–1950), did not take over Woolleigh from his father, which was farmed instead by his younger brother Arthur (1882–1936), who took over Wolleigh in 1925. In 1910 William Henry married Annie Elizabeth Wadland (1882–1983) and died in 1950 at Broadclyst, Devon leaving three daughters.
Arthur Leverton (1882–1936)
Second son who took over Wolleigh in 1925 following his father's death. He died at Woolleigh in 1936. In his will dated 13 May 1936 he described himself as "yeoman" and "of Woolleigh" and refers to "my house Woolleigh" and left cash bequests to his cattleman, horseman, shepherd, pigman and to two labourers. He was Chairman of the North Devon Clay Company, which was incorporated in 1893 and took over the business of the Marland Brick and Clay Works Ltd, probably the first limited liability company in the ball clay industry which built the Marland light railway from the works to Torrington. In Islington, London in 1920 he married Florence Isabel Dyer (died 1944), but died without children.

=== Pengelly ===
The next occupants of Woolleigh were the Pengelly family.

John Chamings Pengelly (1882-7 Oct 1942)
Died at Woolleigh in 1942, and was buried in the Methodist's Church burial ground, Marwood, Devon, where his gravestone survives.
Wilfrid Pengelly
Two monochrome photographs of him in the performance of traditional farming activities were taken by the photographer James Ravilious, who had been commissioned by the Beaford Centre to "show the people of North Devon to themselves". The photographs are titled "Setting up (wheat) stooks" (1974), and "Milking a Jersey cow".

== Sources ==
- Acland, Anne. A Devon Family: The Story of the Aclands. London and Chichester: Phillimore, 1981.
- Pole, Sir William (died 1635), Collections Towards a Description of the County of Devon, Sir John-William de la Pole (ed.), London, 1791, pp. 382–3, Wollegh
- Risdon, Tristram (died 1640), Survey of Devon, 1811 edition, London, 1811, with 1810 Additions, p. 269, Woolley
