= Ravilious =

Ravilious is a surname. It is likely of Huguenot origin, and in the UK was originally only recorded in the county of Kent. Notable people with the surname include:

- Eric Ravilious (1903–1942), British painter, designer, book illustrator and wood-engraver
- James Ravilious (1939–1999), British photographer; son of Eric
- Tirzah Ravilious (1908–1951; née Garwood), British artist; wife of Eric
