= Eaglescott Airfield =

Airfield in Devon, England

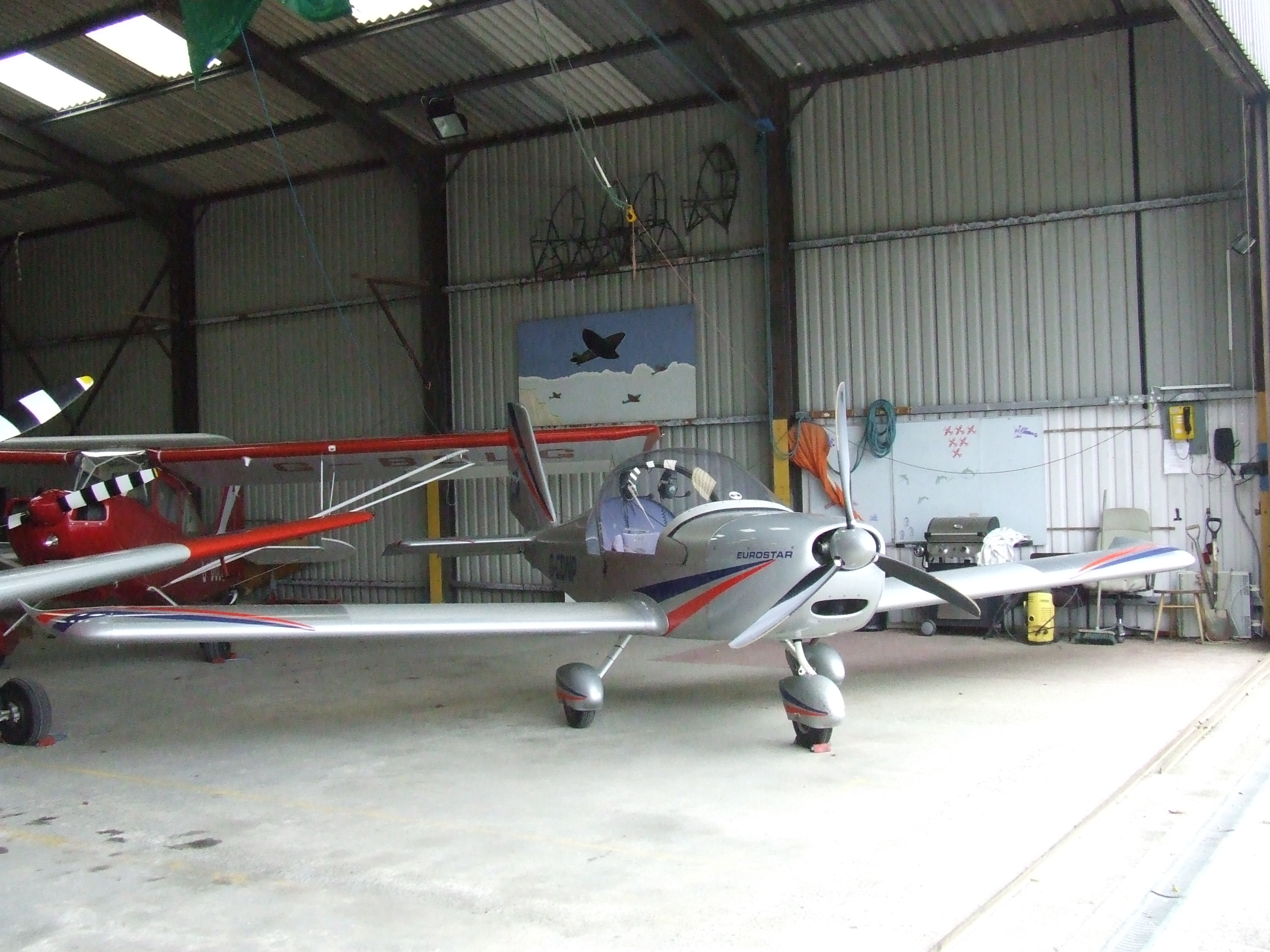
- A EuroStar basic trainer at Eaglescott Airfield
- IATA: none; ICAO: EGHU

Summary
- Airport type: Public
- Operator: Devon Airsports Ltd
- Location: Great Torrington
- Elevation AMSL: 655 ft / 200 m
- Coordinates: 50°55′43″N 003°59′22″W
- Website: www.eaglescott-airfield.com

Map
- Location in Devon

Runways
Direction	Length		Surface
Direction	m	ft	Surface
07/25	600	1,969	Grass

Eaglescott Airfield (ICAO: EGHU) is located in Burrington, 6 nautical miles (11 km; 6.9 mi) east southeast of Great Torrington, in Devon, England. It is also the northern operating base of the Devon Air Ambulance.

Eaglescott Aerodrome had a CAA Ordinary Licence (Number P742) that allowed flights for the public transport of passengers or for flying instruction as authorised by the licensee (Devon Airsports Limited). The aerodrome is not licensed for night use.
