= Devon Air Ambulance =

English charity air ambulance

Devon Air Ambulance Trust

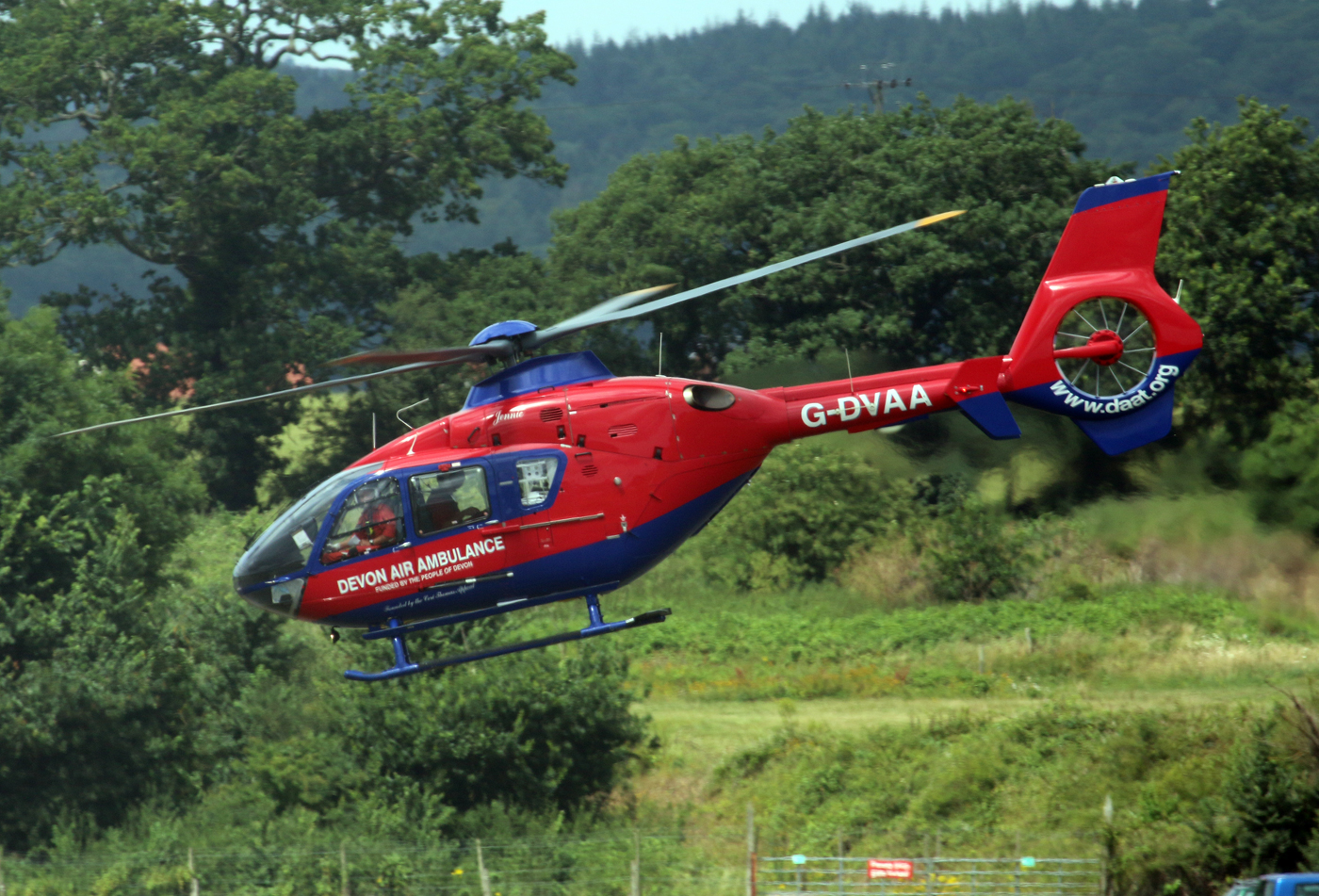
- Founded: 27 August 1992
- Type: Charitable organisation
- Registration no.: 1077998
- Location: Exeter Airport, Devon
- Region served: County of Devon
- Aircraft operated: Eurocopter EC135; Airbus Helicopters H145
- Revenue: £15.8 million (2024)
- Employees: 177 (2024)
- Volunteers: 608 (2024)
- Website: www.daat.org

The Devon Air Ambulance Trust (DAAT) is a registered charity providing emergency medical services through the provision of two helicopter-based air ambulances and two critical care cars, which cover the county of Devon in South West England. The helicopters and cars are owned and operated by the charity, which raises money from public donations and its charity shops.

== History ==
DAAT was formed by Ann Thomas, in memory of her son, 18-year-old Ceri Thomas, who was fatally injured in a road traffic collision in 1986. At hospital, his mother learned that the quicker a patient receives hospital treatment, the greater that patient's chances of survival. Subsequently, she started a campaign to launch an air ambulance service for Devon.

The service went into operation on 27 August 1992, covering the entirety of the county of Devon, including the rural and inaccessible moors of Exmoor and Dartmoor. The charity currently operates two helicopters, and can reach 50 per cent of locations in Devon within five minutes of taking to the air, with remaining locations accessible within 20 minutes.

== Organisation ==
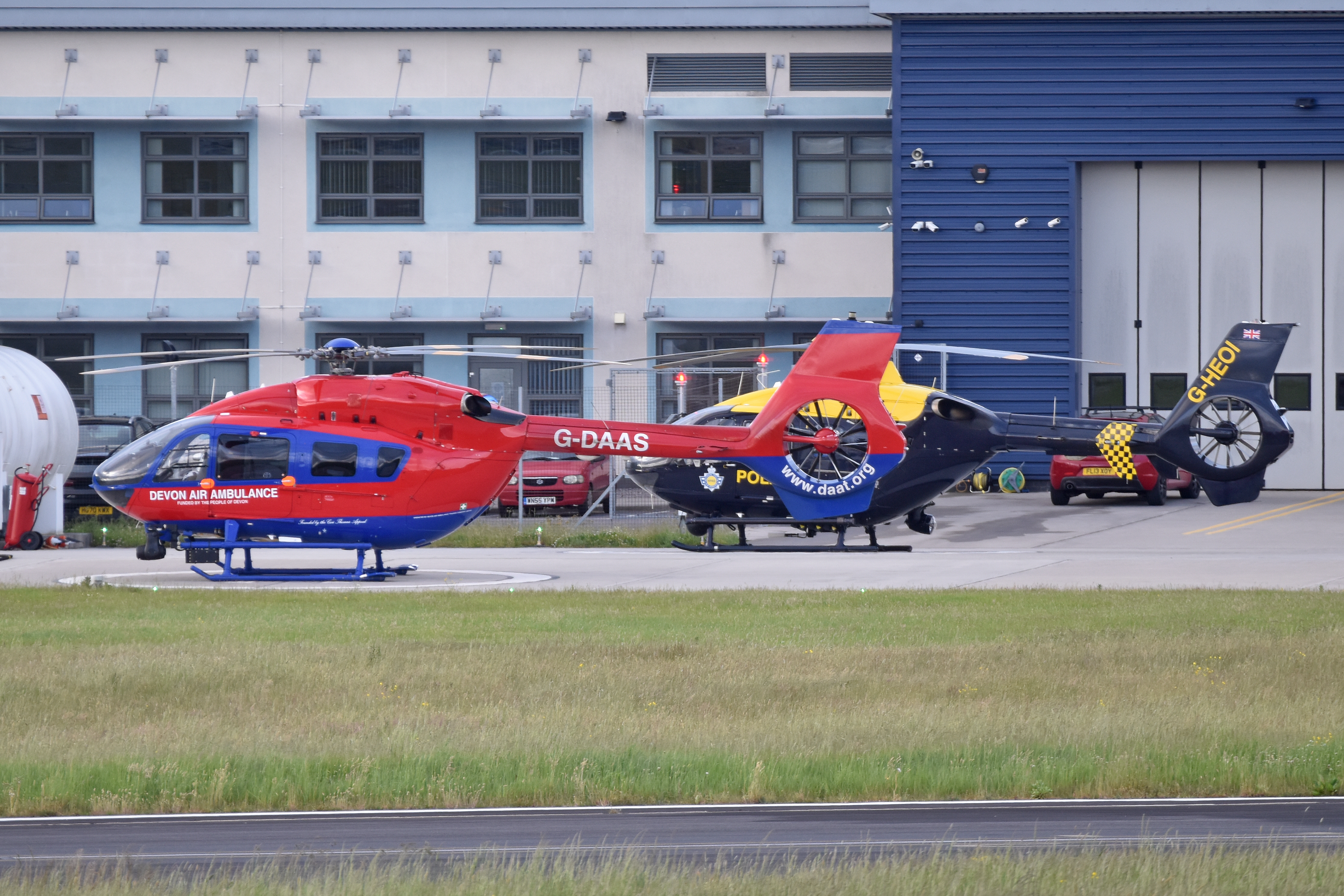
Devon Air Ambulance H145 G-DAAS is co-located with the police EC135 G-HEOI at Exeter Airport

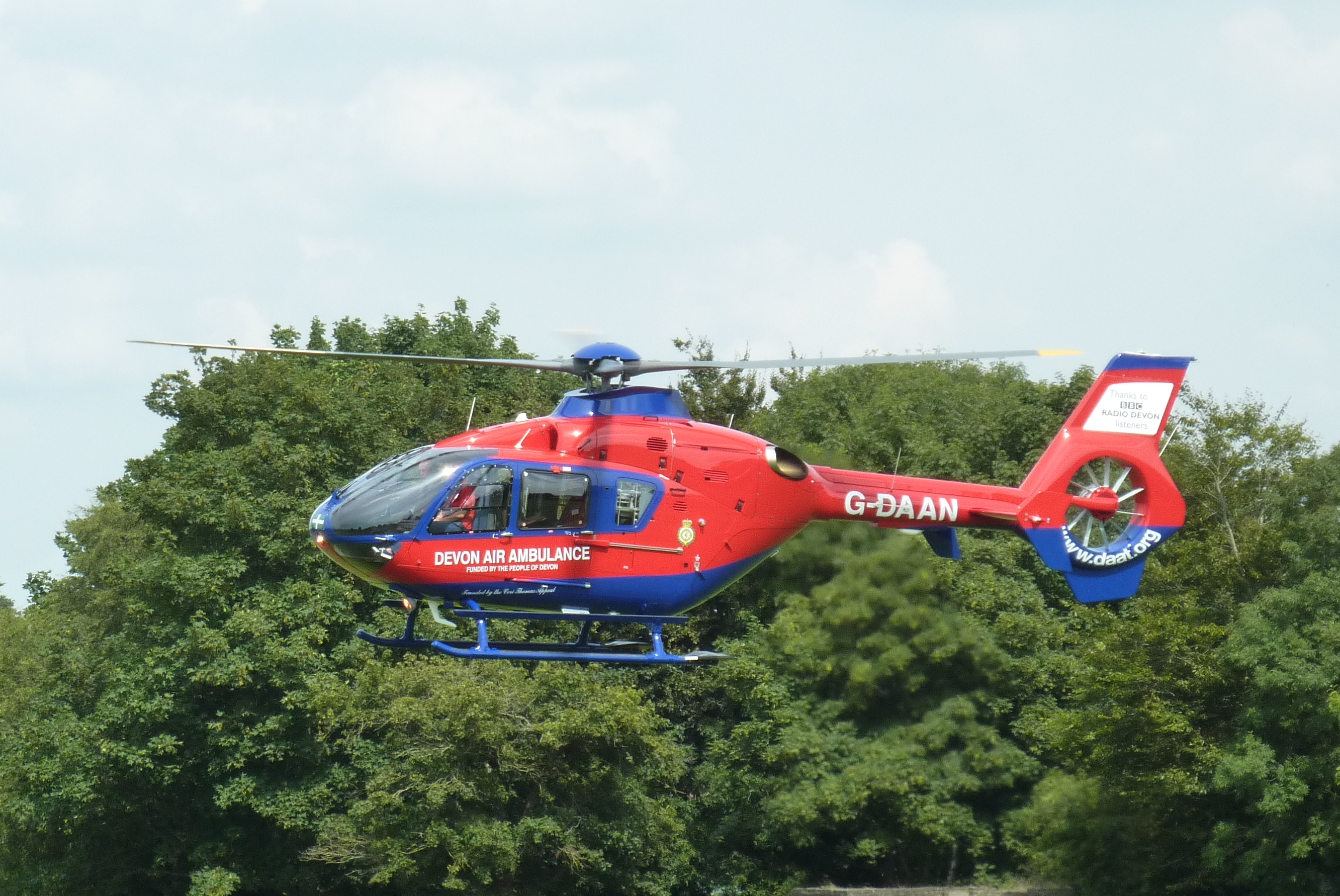
Great Torrington-based EC135 helicopter G-DAAN

DAAT owns and operates two helicopters, from two different airfields, to maximise coverage of the county. Both helicopters fly for ten hours a day, seven days a week. From late autumn 2016, the Exeter-based helicopter flew into the hours of darkness, up to midnight, into one of a network of community night-landing sites created across the county.

The Exeter-based Airbus Helicopters H145 registered G-DAAS, was delivered to DAAT in June 2020, and entered into service in November 2020. It is located along with the National Police Air Service helicopter at Exeter Airport.

The North Devon-based Eurocopter EC135 P2+ helicopter, registered G-DAAN, is located at Eaglescott Airfield, previously at Belle Vue Airfield, near Great Torrington.

In 2020, the charity introduced two critical care cars, both Volvo XC90, which allow the service to be delivered when helicopters are unable to fly.

== Role ==
DAAT's mission statement is: "To relieve sickness and injury in and around the county of Devon through provision of an emergency Air Ambulance service". The charity provides air ambulance cover for the entire county. Up to 2019, the charity's paramedics were provided on secondment from South Western Ambulance Service, but these are now DAAT employees.

== Finances ==
DAAT typically receives no funding from the government (although in 2021 it received £317,000 in government grants from Covid support), nor the National Lottery, relying instead on public and businesses donations, plus income generated by its shops and society lottery helps to meet annual running costs.

In 2024, the charity's income was £15.8M and it spent £14.8M, of which £9.2M (62%) was used to provide its charitable service. The charity has 177 employees, of which 42 are paid between £60,000 and £120,000 per year.

Both helicopters bear the signature of television presenter and patron Jennie Bond, who named the charity as her choice during her appearance in the show I'm a Celebrity...Get Me Out of Here!. The money raised enabled the charity to buy a GPS moving map system for the first helicopter.

BBC Radio Devon also ran a two-year appeal which raised the final £850,000 needed to buy a second owned aircraft (G-DAAN).

== See also ==
- Air ambulances in the United Kingdom
- Cornwall Air Ambulance
- Dorset and Somerset Air Ambulance
