= Dafforn =

Dafforn is an English surname. Notable people with the surname include:

- Robert Dafforn (1916–1943), English flying ace
- Tim Dafforn, English biophysical chemist and biotechnologist
