= The Plough Arts Centre, Torrington =

Coordinates: 50.919°N 4.209°W

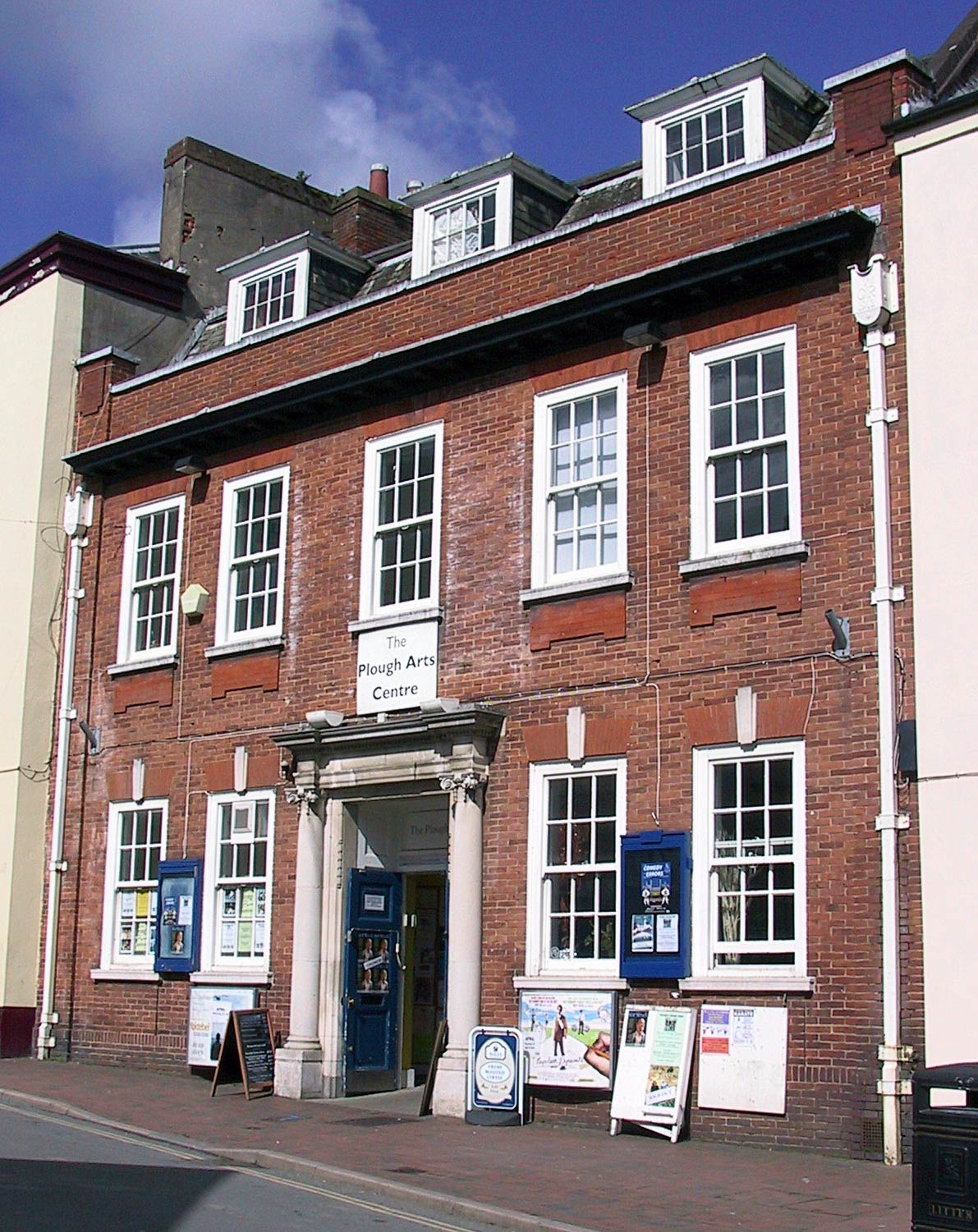
The Plough Arts Centre on Fore Street in the centre of Great Torrington.

The Plough Arts Centre is a theatre, cinema and art gallery in Torrington, North Devon, England.

The Plough is situated in a former Territorial Army drill hall on Fore Street in the centre of Torrington. The site was previously a 16th-century town house which was turned into a public house, The Plough Inn in 1750, giving the centre its current name. The pub was licensed until 1910 but had fallen into disrepair and was demolished in 1912. The building we see today was completed in 1913.

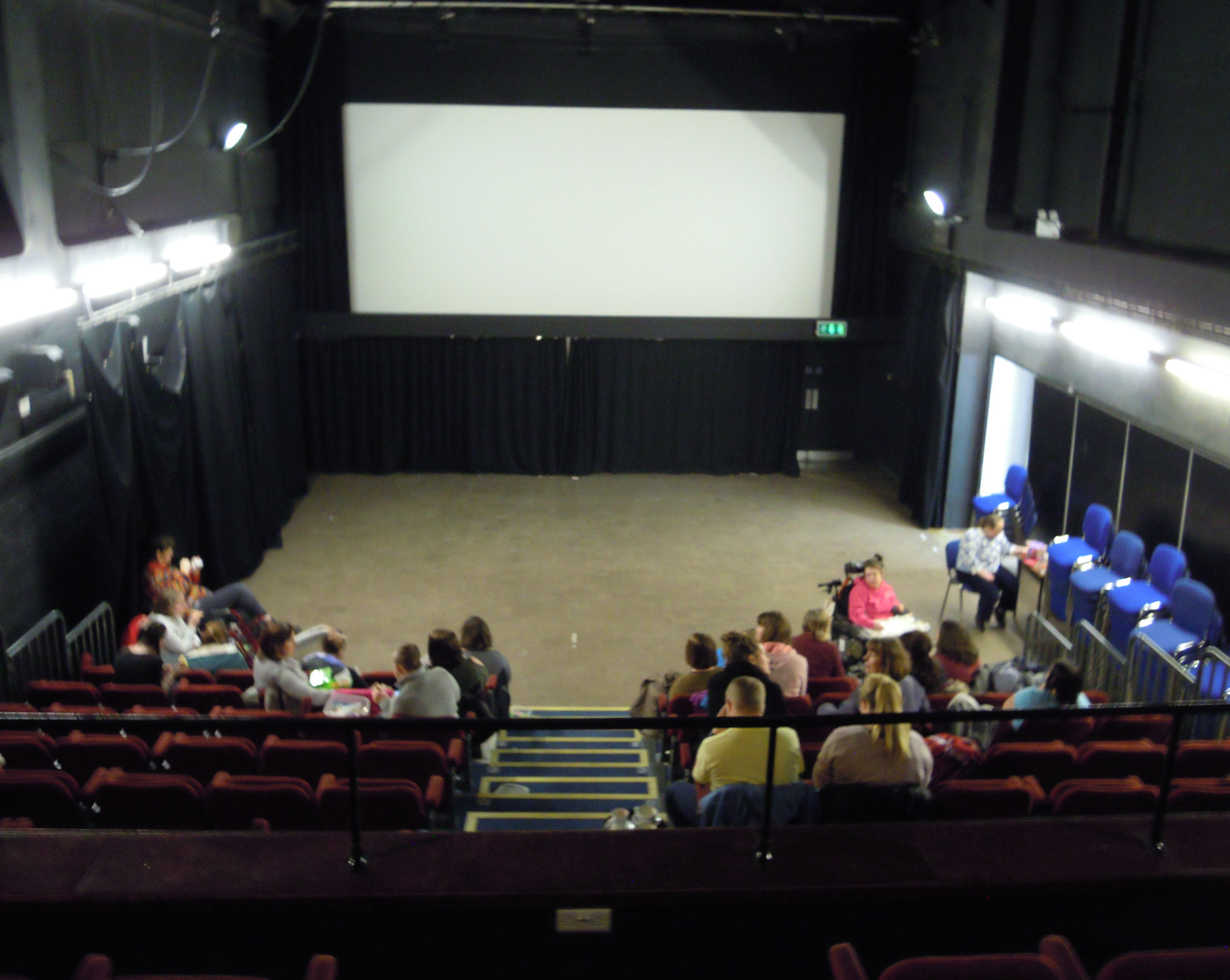
The auditorium

The Plough was founded in 1975 and opened with a performance by Dame Edith Evans. In 1991 financial problems threatened The Plough with closure: it was saved through a merger with the nearby Beaford Arts which was established in 1966 by the Dartington Hall Trust to promote and support the arts in rural north Devon. Beaford withdrew in 2002, and The Plough is now again independent and hosts theatre, cinema, music, comedy and art exhibitions. The theatre has 132 raked seats but has the capacity to expand to 240 people.

In 2014 a 60-year-old 35mm celluloid Westar projector was supplemented with a digital projector and enhancements to technical capabilities at the centre, including a new box office system. The money was raised by public fundraising backed by Alistair McGowan, who is a patron of The Plough. The campaign was also boosted by the $4,500 raised at an event with Michael Portillo.

== Workshops ==
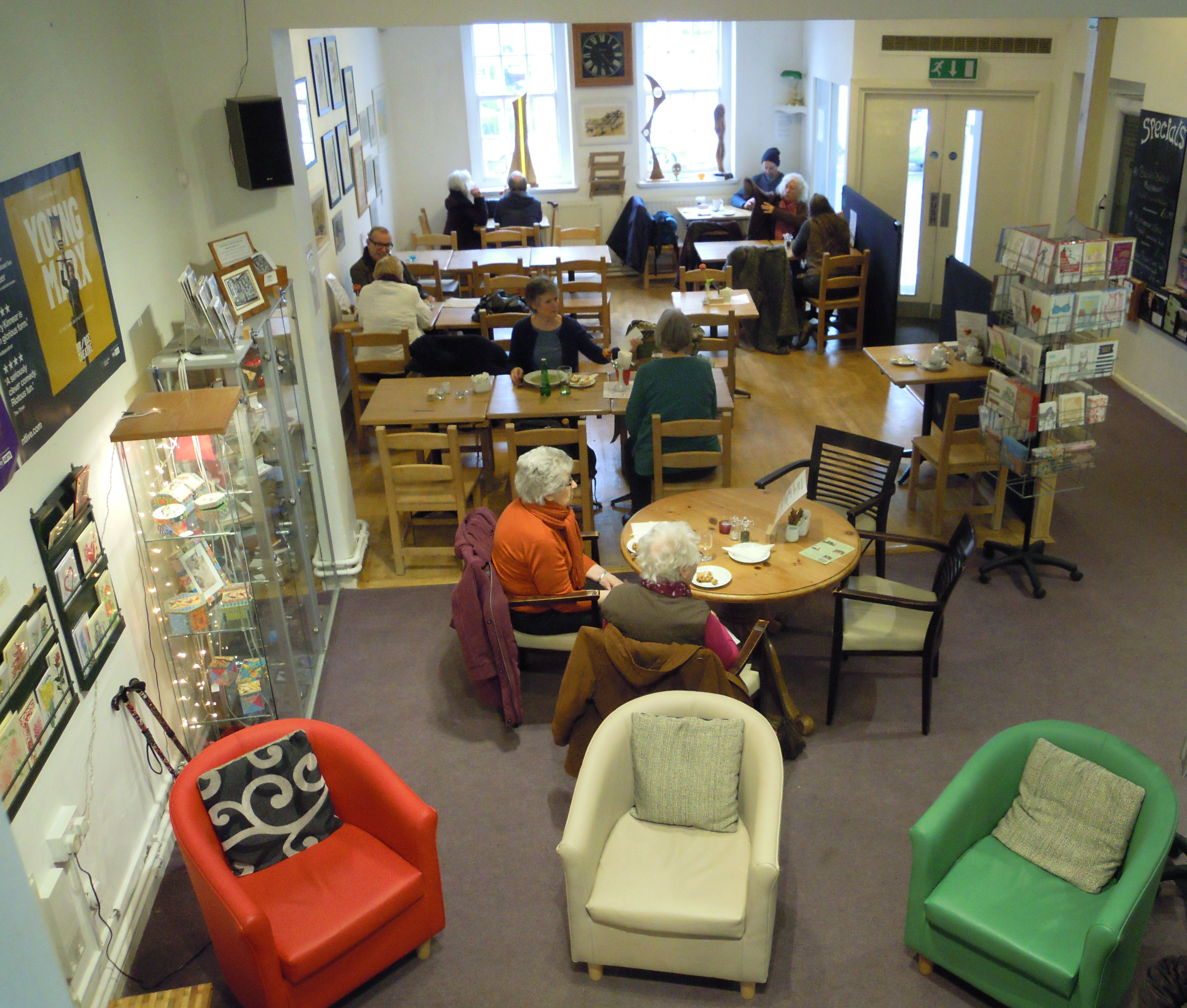
The Theatre Café

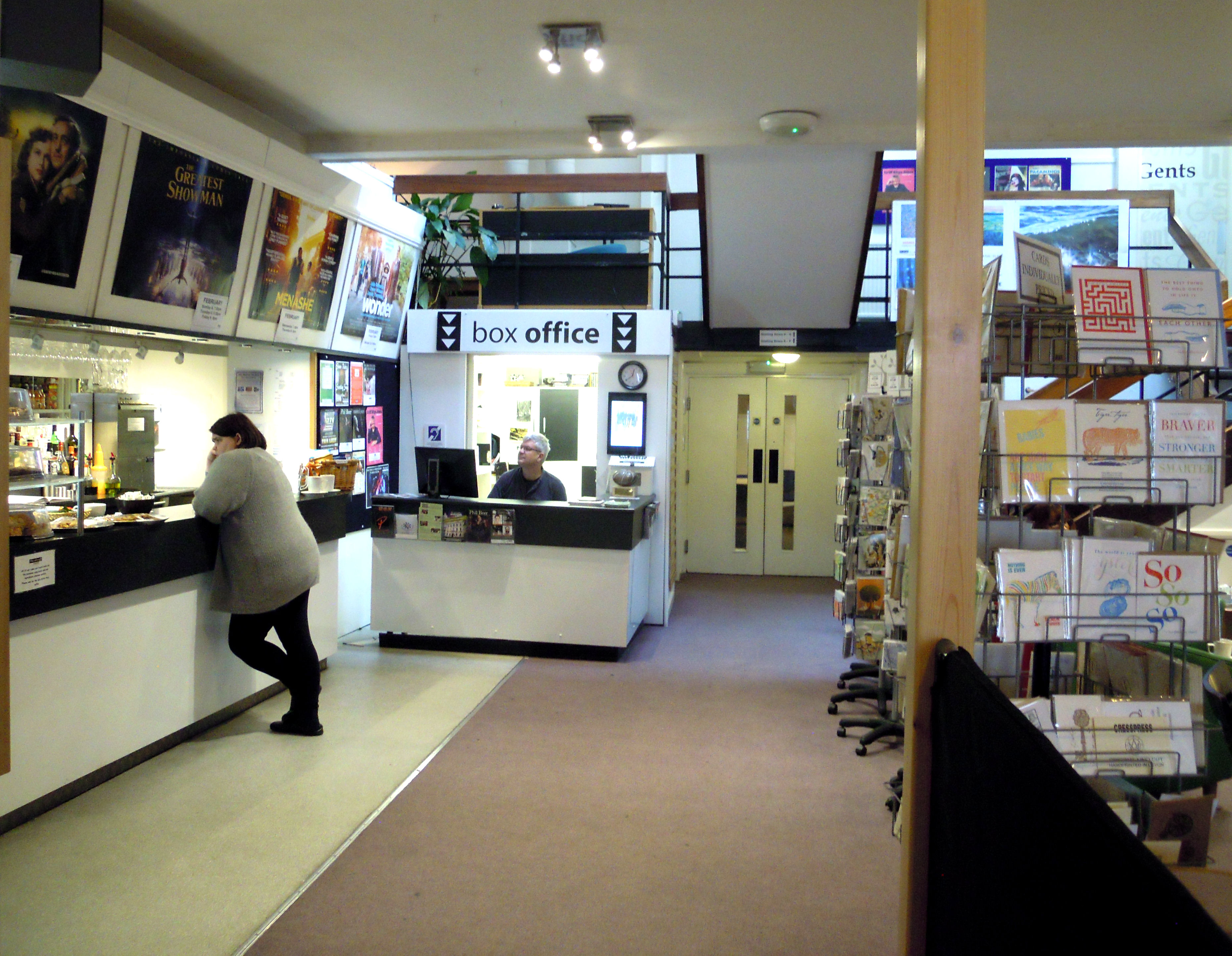
The theatre box office

The Plough Arts Centre runs many creative workshops for people of all ages and abilities. It is the home of the Plough Youth Theatre founded in 2010.
