= Tim Dafforn =

Biologist and chief scientific adviser

Tim Dafforn FIET
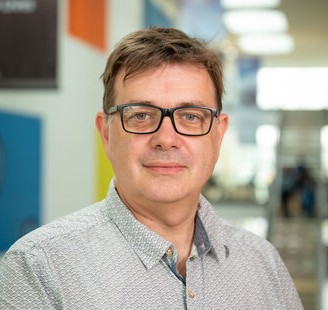
- Tim Dafforn
- Born: Timothy Dafforn; London, United Kingdom
- Education: Great Torrington School
- Alma mater: University of Cardiff (BSc); University of Bristol (PhD)
- Scientific career
- Fields: Biophysical chemistry
- Doctoral advisor: Professor John J. Holbrook

Timothy Dafforn FIET is a British biophysical chemist and biotechnologist. He is a Professor at the University of Birmingham in the UK and Chief Scientific Adviser to the Ministry of Defence.

== Early life and education ==
Dafforn was born in London and raised in North Devon. He attended Great Torrington School and North Devon College (now Petroc College) before studying for Bachelor of Science honours degree in Biochemistry at Cardiff University (1989–92). He carried out his doctoral studies in the Department of Biochemistry at Bristol University. There he studied protein engineering under the supervision of John J. Holbrook, completing his Ph.D. in 1997.

== Academic career ==
Dafforn moved to the Department of Haematology at the University of Cambridge to work with Professor Robin Carrell FRS, studying the role of protease inhibitors including Serpins in blood clotting and immunity regulation. He later moved to work with Professor David Lomas where he successfully defined the polymerisation mechanism for α-1-antitrypsin, a process that underpins the mechanism of forms emphysema. He later moved to the University of Manchester to take on a Medical Research Council Fellowship to study the mechanism of the collagen chaperone, Hsp47.

In 2003, Dafforn joined the School of Biosciences at the University of Birmingham, where he became Professor of Biotechnology. His laboratory has contributed to major advances in the study of membrane proteins, particularly the development and application of styrene–maleic acid lipid particles (SMALPs)—polymer-based tools that allow membrane proteins to be extracted and studied in native-like environments. He has published widely across biophysics, synthetic biology, engineering biology, and translational biotechnology, and has supervised numerous doctoral and postdoctoral researchers.

== Impact and policy ==
Dafforn has notably exploited his work in science for wider impact. His interests in Synthetic/Engineering Biology led him in 2015 to take on the role of Chief Scientific Adviser at the UK Government Department of Business Innovation and Skills (BIS) where he developed policy the ensure entrepreneurship was taught in UK Universities. He then took on a role in 2017 as Chief Entrepreneurial Advisor at the Department of Business, Energy and Industrial Strategy (BEIS) where he developed policy to support Entrepreneurial Culture in the UK. In 2025 Dafforn became Chief Scientific Adviser at the Ministry of Defence.
