= Beaford Arts =

Arts organisation in Devon, England

Beaford Arts is an arts organisation in Devon, England. It was established as The Beaford Centre in 1966 by John Lane for the Dartington Hall Trust.The organisation is now based in Bridge Chambers, Barnstaple. It promotes and supports the arts in rural north Devon - an area of 799 square miles bounded by Dartmoor, Exmoor, and the Atlantic west coast.

Beaford Arts is England's oldest rural arts organisation, It has been involved in a number of arts projects including James Ravilious's work to create the Beaford Archive. This collection of 80,000 black-and-white photographs taken over seventeen years "forms a unique exploration of the society, culture, geography and economy of a 'corner of England'". The Beaford Archive also includes 10,000 older images of north Devon, mainly taken between 1880 and 1920, collected by Ravilious from his subjects during his work. It is currently stored in secure conditions in the North Devon Record Office.

Beaford Arts' present functions are:

- supporting the existing work in the Beaford Archive
- developing and supporting new rural art work
- promoting performances in rural areas (the average population density in northern Devon is 189 people per square mile)
- running a residential arts centre in Beaford for children and young people from across Devon.

For ten years from 1992 the Beaford Centre ran The Plough Arts Centre in Torrington. Since 2002, however, they have been independent organisations.
