= Belle Vue Airfield =

Airfield in north Devon, England

- IATA: none; ICAO: GB-0326

Summary
- Airport type: Public
- Location: Devon, England
- Time zone: GST (+/- 0.00)
- Elevation AMSL: 675 ft / 206 m
- Coordinates: 50°58′40″N 4°05′39″W
- Website: cwileman.wixsite.com/bellevue

Map

Runways
Direction	Length		Surface
Direction	ft	m	Surface
08/26	1,640	500	Grass

Belle Vue Airfield (often classed as airport or heliport) is a single runway airfield about 2.5 miles (4.0 km) north east of Great Torrington in North Devon, England. It is for general and private aviation only, and the 580 meter, or 1,902 foot, runway is grass.

It is most popular for model aircraft flying clubs like the Midlands Large Model Aircraft Flying Club to fly their planes at special events here. It is one of the smallest aviation hubs in Devon.

It was previously the second hub for Devon Air Ambulance.
