= Castle Hill, Torrington =

Two hills in Devon, England

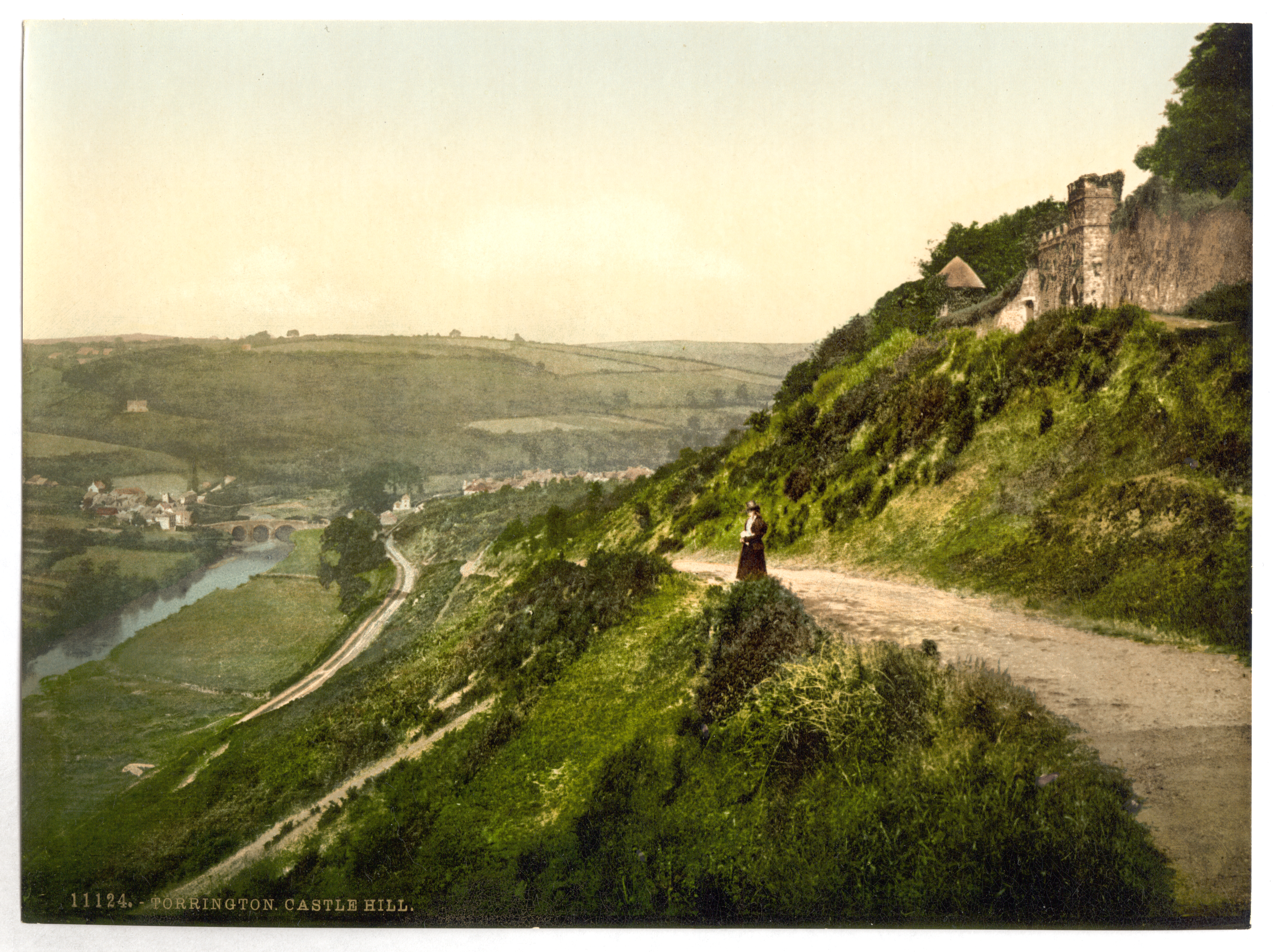
Castle Hill, Torrington

There are two hills named Castle Hill within the immediate environs of Great Torrington in Devon, England.

The first is within the town and is the site of the Norman and mediaeval castles, but was probably an Iron Age hill fort before this. It is located at 50.9509°N 4.1436°W.

The second is a smaller Iron Age earthwork to the southeast along the River Torridge, which is probably also a small hill fort. It is located at 50.9482°N 4.1352°W.
