= Great Torrington School =

Location
- Calvesford Road; Great Torrington, Devon, EX38 7DJ; England
- Coordinates: 50.95517°N 4.13379°W

Information
- Type: Academy
- Department for Education URN: 137228 Tables
- Ofsted: Reports
- Chair of Governors: Ian Newbury
- Acting Headteacher: Andrew Bloodworth
- Gender: Mixed
- Age: 11 to 16
- Enrolment: 724 as of January 2015
- Houses: Endurance, Resolution, Discovery, and Endeavour
- Colour: Green
- Website: www.gts.devon.sch.uk

Great Torrington School is a mixed secondary school located in Great Torrington in the English county of Devon.

Previously a foundation school administered by Devon County Council, Great Torrington School was converted to academy status on 1 August 2011. However the school continues to coordinate with Devon County Council for admissions. Pupils are normally admitted from Beaford Primary School, Buckland Brewer Primary School, Dolton CE Primary School, Great Torrington Junior School, Horwood & Newton Tracey Primary School, Langtree Community School, Monkleigh Primary School, Shebbear Community School, The Clinton CE Primary School and West & East Putford School.

Following a summer 2018 protest in which male pupils wore skirts and female pupils supported them by wearing trousers, accompanied by a petition, the school agreed in 2019 that pupils would be permitted to wear shorts during the summer term, while still requiring them to adhere to other aspects of the school's uniform policy.
