= James Ravilious =

English photographer (1939–1999)

James Ravilious, self portrait

James Ravilious (22 August 1939 – 29 September 1999), was a British photographer, who specialised in recording the rural life of north Devon.

== Early life ==
James Ravilious was born in Eastbourne, the second son of the artists Eric Ravilious and Tirzah Garwood, and educated at Bedford School. Following the death of his father in the Second World War, in March 1944 Garwood moved her young children to Boydells Farm, near Wethersfield, Essex, then following her remarriage to Henry Swanzy to Adelaide Road, Hampstead before her death from cancer on 27 March 1951. He was then raised by John Swanzy, his stepfather's brother.

Having studied as an accountant, Ravilious made a career change and entered St Martin's School of Art in London, under the assumed name of Souryer in 1959. He subsequently worked as a teacher at Hammersmith College for seven years.

== Photography ==
Inspired by an exhibition of the work of French photographer Henri Cartier-Bresson, Ravilious took up photography shortly after moving with his wife to Devon in the 1970s. He was asked to contribute work to the Beaford Archive, a means of documenting images to show the lifestyle associated with a small area of North Devon. What began as a short-term project turned into a 17-year quest. Ravilious made some 80,000 black and white images for Beaford Arts, and preserved some 5,000 old photographs of the area. The archive is an internationally important collection. An exhibition of his work The English Countryside was shown at Royal Photographic Society's Octagon exhibition space in 1981.

== Personal life ==
In 1970 Ravilious married Caroline (known as Robin) Whistler, daughter of glass-engraver and poet Laurence Whistler. They had two children and collaborated on books together.

James Ravilious died of lymphoma aged 60 on 29 September 1999.

== Publications ==
- Ravilious, James. Heart of the Country. London: Scolar, 1980. ISBN 0-85967-590-4
- Ravilious, James. A Corner of England: North Devon Landscapes and People. Tiverton: Devon, 1996. ISBN 0-86114-897-5
- Hamilton, Peter. An English Eye: The Photographs of James Ravilious. Tiverton: Devon, 1998. ISBN 1-85522-628-6.
- Ravilious, James. Down the Deep Lanes. Devon, 2001. ISBN 1-85522-743-6
- Ravilious, James. The Recent Past. with an Introduction by Robin Ravilious, London: Wilmington Square, 2017. ISBN 978-1-908524-93-5
- Ravilious, Robin. James Ravilious: a Life. London: Wilmington Square, 2017. ISBN 978-1-908524-94-2
