= Great Torrington =

Town in Devon, England

Coordinates: 50.953°N 4.141°W

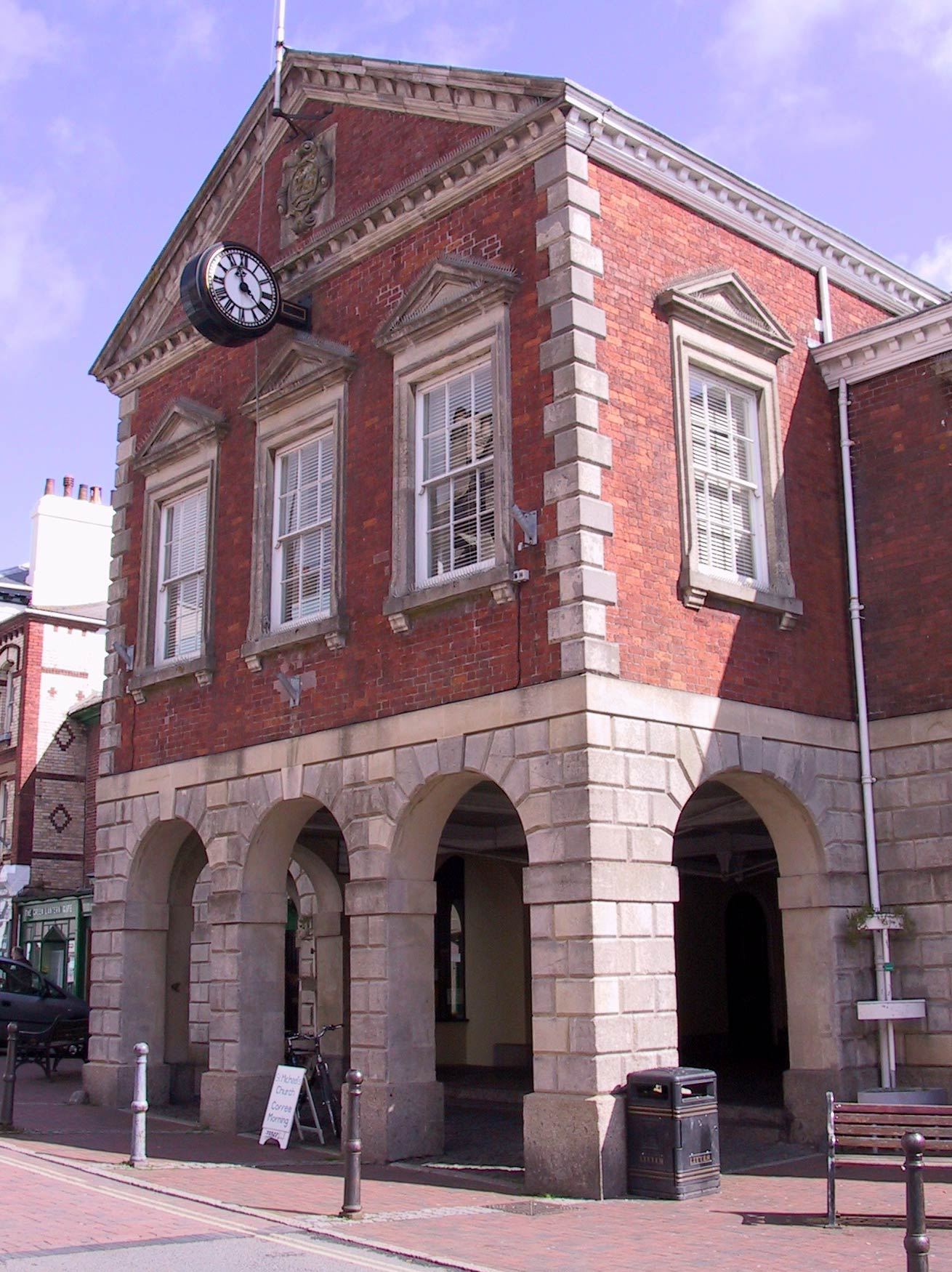
- Great Torrington Town Hall in the centre of the town

- Coat of arms

- Location within Devon
- Population: 5,953 (2021 Census)
- OS grid reference: SS4919
- District: Torridge
- Shire county: Devon
- Region: South West
- Country: England
- Sovereign state: United Kingdom
- Post town: TORRINGTON
- Postcode district: EX38
- Dialling code: 01805
- Police: Devon and Cornwall
- Fire: Devon and Somerset
- Ambulance: South Western
- UK Parliament: Torridge and Tavistock

Great Torrington (often abbreviated to Torrington, though the villages of Little Torrington and Black Torrington are situated in the same region) is a market town in Devon, England. Parts of it are sited on high ground with steep drops down to the River Torridge below, with the lower-lying parts of the town prone to occasional flooding. Torrington is in the centre of Tarka Country, a landscape captured by Henry Williamson in his novel Tarka the Otter in 1927. Great Torrington has one of the most active volunteering communities in the United Kingdom.

In July 2019, Great Torrington was reported to be the healthiest place to live in Britain. Researchers from the University of Liverpool found that the area had low levels of pollution, good access to green space and health services, along with few retail outlets.

== History ==
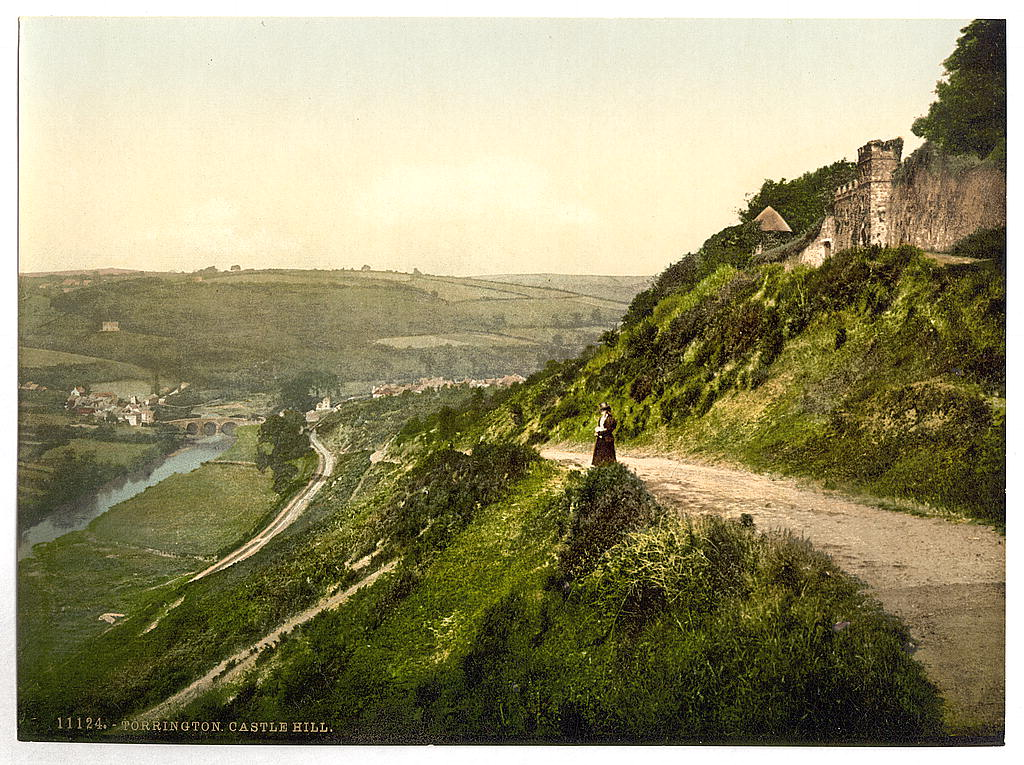
"Castle Hill, Torrington, England", ca. 1890 – 1900

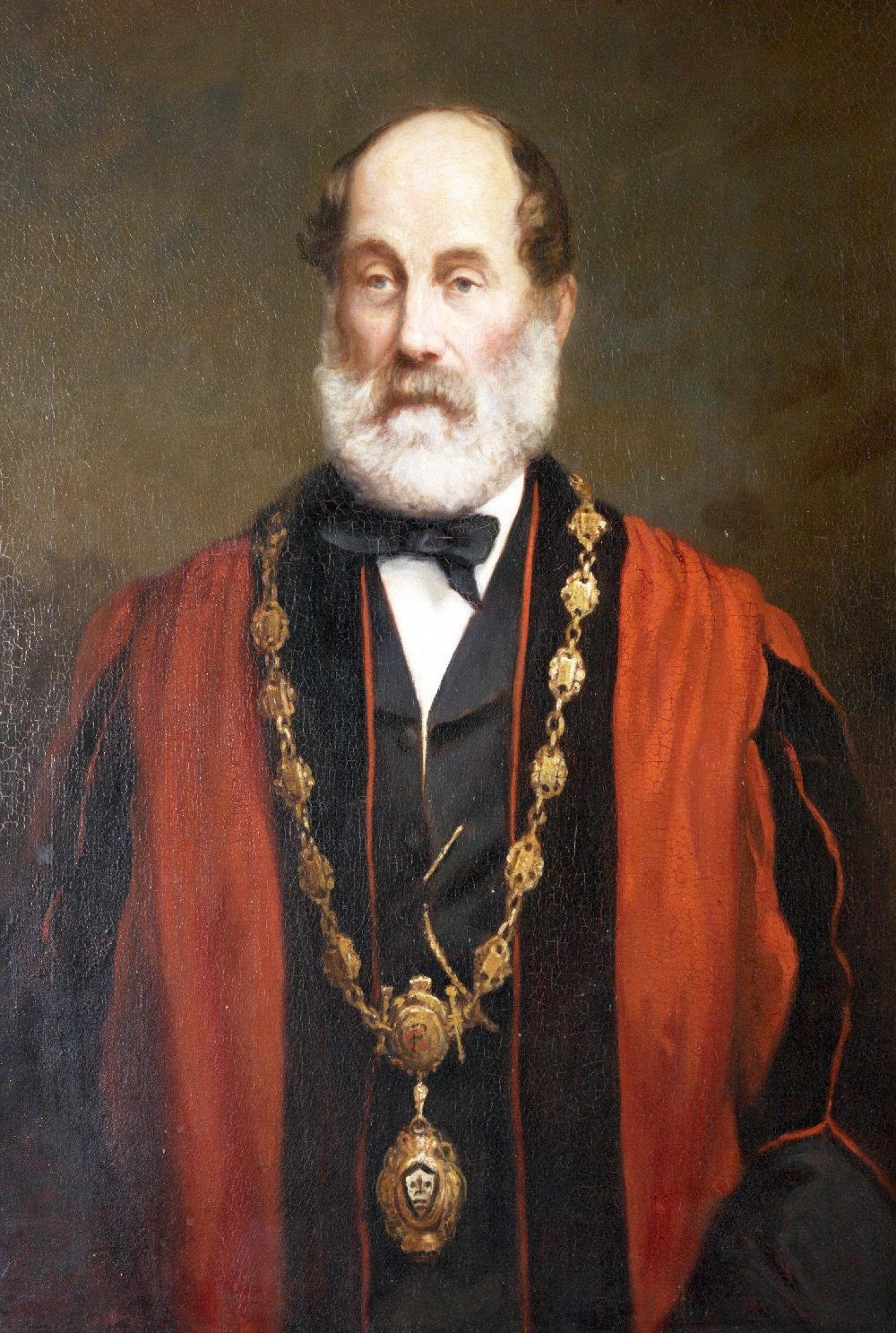
Alderman Nathaniel Chapple, Mayor of Torrington (1871, 1879 & 1889) by Henry Jamyn Brooks

There were Iron Age and medieval castles and forts in Torrington, located on the Castle Hill.

The name of the town derives from that of the River Torridge plus the Old English tūn meaning 'settlement'.

Great Torrington had strategic significance in the English Civil War. In the Battle of Torrington (1646), the Parliamentarians, led by Sir Thomas Fairfax, swept into the town and defeated Lord Hopton's forces. This marked the end of Royalist resistance in the West Country. Today the town is recognised as an important heritage centre for the history of the 17th century, and its people can often be seen dressed in costume for historical re-enactments, festivals and celebrations. An interactive Civil War Experience, "Torrington 1646", used to mark the town's historically important role. The Torrington jail was not big enough for more than one man so the Royalists kept all the Parliamentarian prisoners in the church. Then 70 barrels of gunpowder exploded and killed everyone held captive and many of their captors. Great Torrington Town Hall, a neoclassical style building, was completed in 1861.

=== Railway ===
Torrington station on 15 June 1969 looking towards Bideford

The branch line from Barnstaple to Bideford was extended to Great Torrington in July 1872 by the London and South Western Railway, which built a railway station and locomotive depot in the town. The station was always named 'Torrington', not 'Great Torrington'.

The locomotive depot was closed in 1959 and the line was closed to passenger traffic as part of the Beeching Axe. It was closed to goods traffic in 1984. At the site of the old station there is still in 2015 a pub named The Puffing Billy. A few small sections of track remain, but most has been removed and replaced with a combined foot and cycle path as part of the Tarka Trail. The Tarka Trail continues to Bideford, Barnstaple and on to Braunton in one direction, and to Meeth in the other, making 32 miles (51 km) of traffic free trail.

The narrow gauge wooden viaduct over the Torridge in 1905

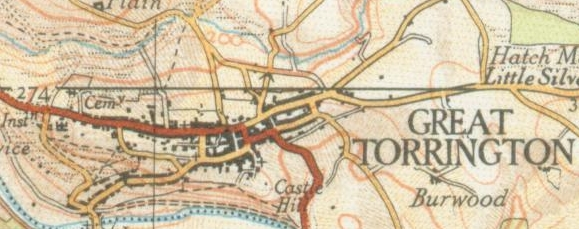
Great Torrington in 1937

== Descent of the manor ==
The manor of Great Torrington was granted by Queen Mary to James Basset (1526–1558), MP, a younger son of Sir John Bassett (1462 – 31 Jan 1529) of Umberleigh. James's son Philip Bassett sold it to Sir John Fortescue (c. 1531–1607) of Ponsbourne, near Hatfield, Hertfordshire, the eldest son of Sir Adrian Fortescue (1476–1539), descended from Richard Fortescue, younger brother of Henry Fortescue (fl. 1426), Lord Chief Justice of the Common Pleas in Ireland and of Sir John Fortescue (ca. 1394–1480), Lord Chief Justice of England and Wales. Denys Rolle (1614–1638) of nearby Stevenstone in the parish of St Giles in the Wood, acquired the lordship of the manor of Great Torrington from his descendant Sir William Fortescue. Denys Rolle (1614–1638) founded the Bluecoat School in Torrington The fountain and clock in the square were given in 1870 by Mark Rolle (1835–1907) A number of family portraits were given to the town by the heirs of Mark Rolle, some of which remain on display in the Great Torrington Town Hall, some of the more valuable ones having been sold, including a portrait of John Rolle Walter (c.1714–1779) by Pompeo Batoni.

== Torrington Common ==
Torrington Common is an area of common land which surrounds the town on all but the eastern side. The common is administered by a body called "The Commons Conservators". The Common covers 365 acres (148 ha) and has over 20 miles (32 kilometres) of public rights of way. The landscape features a variety of habitats, flora and fauna.

=== History of the common ===
An "area of waste called the Common" was donated to the town in 1194 by the feudal baron of Great Torrington. In 1889, the rights to this land were transferred by an Act of Parliament to an elected "Committee of Conservators". The bill was subject of a local poll, as the document now at Devon Record Office evidences:

Poll of inhabitants on "A Bill for Vesting the Management of Great Torrington Common, Castle Hill Common and other lands in the Borough of Great Torrington in the County of Devon in a Body of Conservators and to settle questions between the Commoners of Great Torrington and the Owners of the Rolle Estate and for other purposes".

The Rolle Estate was the largest landowner in Devon, having been built up by the Rolle family of Stevenstone. Since 2 October 1889 the Conservators have met regularly to fulfil their remit to manage the land. Early activity was mainly concerned with control over the grazing and quarrying of the common, but since 1980 grazing has stopped and instead various techniques have taken its place to prevent the common from reverting to scrub and woodland.

=== Features of the common ===
- Taddiport Bridge and Rothern Bridge: Prior to the opening of the Town Mills Bridge, these were the only local crossings of the River Torridge.
- Rolle Road: This is the site of the Rolle Canal which opened in 1827 to help transport clay, lime and other commodities between the boats on the tidal river at Landcross and the lime kilns, clay pits and farms around Torrington. It ran through common land, but was closed in 1871. Later, it was filled in to create a toll road across the Common.
- Waterloo Monument: A stone obelisk erected in 1818 by "the ladies of Great Torrington" to commemorate the Battle of Waterloo.

== Visitor attractions ==
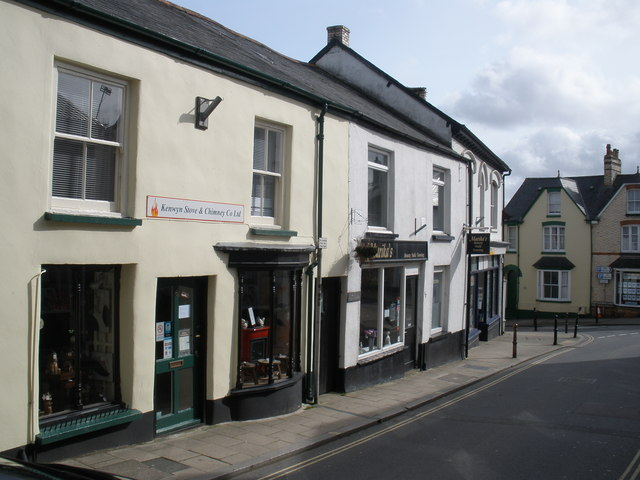
Cornmarket Street, Great Torrington

Attractions in Great Torrington include:

- Dartington Crystal, Factory, Visitors Centre, Glass Shop and Restaurant of Dartington Crystal – the biggest employer in the town and the only major working glass factory in the UK

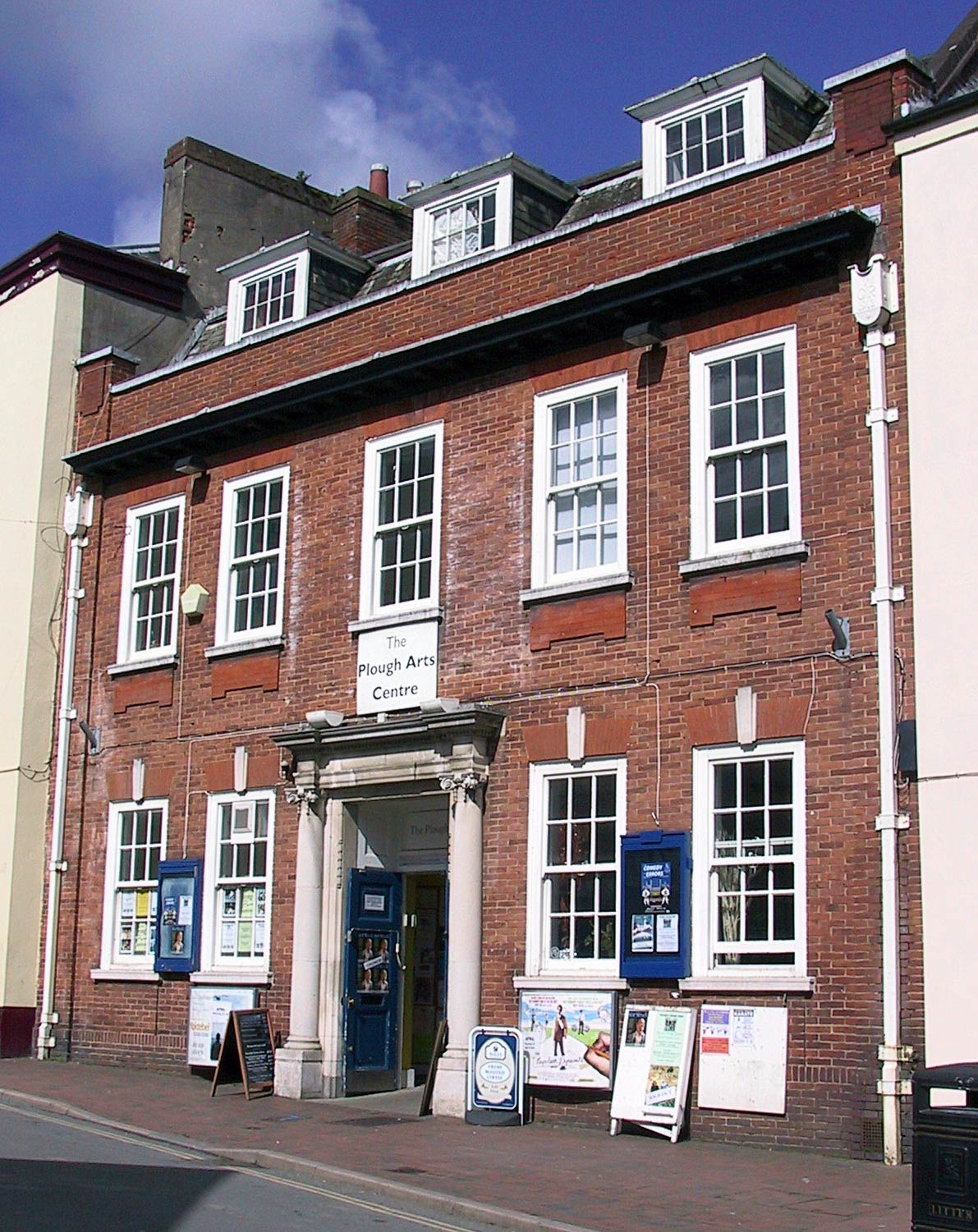
The Plough Arts Centre is Great Torrington's theatre, cinema and art gallery.

- Rosemoor Garden, a collection of gardens, woodlands and parkland owned by the Royal Horticultural Society
- The Victorian Torrington Pannier Market with a glass roof, restored in 1999
- Great Torrington Heritage Museum, located next to the Pannier Market
- St Michael and All Angels, a Church of England parish church whose churchyard includes a mound said to contain the remains of 60 Civil War Royalist prisoners
- The Plough Arts Centre, a small theatre, cinema and gallery
- Great Torrington also has a selection of pubs selling food and a selection of real ales. These include The Torridge Inn, Torrington Arms, Cavalier and Royal Exchange. Torrington had a small brewery called Clearwater Brewery with its "Cavalier" and "1646" brands.

== Employment ==
Torrington has long been a factory town. In the nineteenth century it was a centre of the glove making industry. The major employer today is Dartington Crystal, but the shops in the town centre also provide a source of employment. Most of the shops are locally owned; however, there are branches of The Co-operative Food and Lidl. Large factories have deserted the town in recent years including the meat factory after a fire, and the milk factory which also caught fire has moved its production elsewhere. Various converted and purpose-built care homes in the town also provide a significant source of employment.

In 2006, Tesco sought to open a 30,000-square-foot (2,800 m^{2}) store in the town; however, this was opposed by many locals and the planning application was rejected.

== Sports and culture ==
Local radio is provided by Radio Exe Devon and The Voice, a station based in nearby Barnstaple that broadcasts across North Devon on FM and DAB. Most of the content on the station is locally produced.

Local news and television programmes are provided by BBC South West and ITV West Country. Television signals are received from the nearby Huntshaw Cross TV transmitter situated north east of the town.

BBC Local Radio station that broadcast to the town is BBC Radio Devon on 94.8 FM.

The regional radio station Heart West can be received in the town on FM and DAB. The station is a part of the Heart network and broadcasts across the South West of England. Most of the shows broadcast are national shows from the Heart London studios, rather than region-specific ones. Region-specific content includes the weekday Drivetime show produced in Bristol, and local advertising.

The local newspaper is the North Devon Journal also based in Barnstaple. The Western Morning News is a regional paper widely available. Most households receive a copy of the North Devon Gazette every week. The Crier is the community newsletter and diary delivered free to most households in the town and surrounding area for ten months of the year.

Torrington's football teams are Torrington F.C. in the South West Peninsula League Premier Division East, and Torridgeside A.F.C. in the South West Peninsula League Premier Division East There are also rugby, netball, tennis and swimming teams. Torrington nine-hole Golf Course is 1.2 miles (2 km) northwest of the town centre. Great Torrington Bowling Club, established in 1645, is the third oldest bowling club in England. As of 2024 Torrington is also home to North Devon’s first and only Baseball Club, the Torrington Riptides. Torrington has a running and athletics club, Torrington AAC, who train weekly in and around the town.

Great Torrington is twinned with the French port town of Roscoff, situated in northern Brittany. Roscoff is served by the Brittany Ferries service from Plymouth and is a popular destination for school trips from the area.

== Transport ==
Torrington is served by 43 local bus services mostly operated by Stagecoach South West. Some only operate one way and a number are weekly only service.

Belle Vue Airfield is a single runway airfield about 2.5 miles northeast of Great Torrington. It is for private aviation only, operating restricted flying hours and is frequented by Microlight and hang-gliding clubs. The 580-metre (1,902-foot) runway is grass.

Exeter Airport, 35 miles (56 km) away, operates scheduled flights to locations across the UK and Europe.

The nearest ferry port is Plymouth, 40 miles (64 km) away, at which Brittany Ferries offer a regular service from Roscoff in Brittany. There is a summertime-only ferry service based at Bideford Harbour (7 miles away) to and from Lundy Island.

Torrington has no direct train services; Umberleigh (8 miles away) is served by the Tarka Line from Exeter St David's. Bus connections are available to and from Barnstaple station (11 miles away).

== Notable people ==
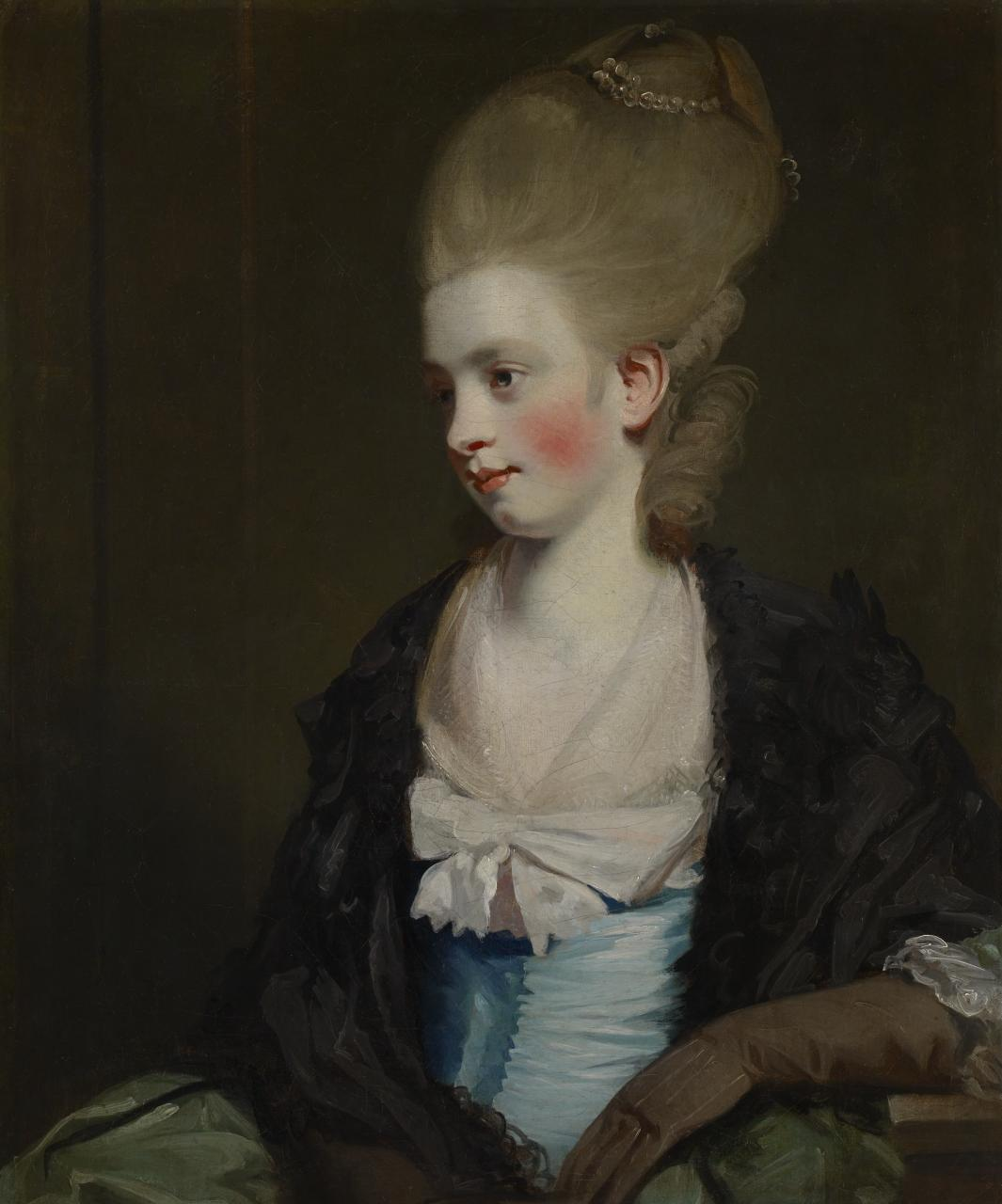
Theophila Gwatkin by Joshua Reynolds, ca 1777–1781

- Tristram Risdon (c. 1580–1640), an English antiquarian and topographer.
- George Monck, 1st Duke of Albemarle (1608–1670), a professional soldier from Devon.
- Roger Flexman (1708–1795) a Unitarian minister and a chronological and historical scholar.
- Elizabeth Johnson (1721–1800), pamphleteer, tried to find a simple method to determine a ship's longitude, died locally
- Theophila Gwatkin (1757–1848), a British painter, an amateur artist and niece of Sir Joshua Reynolds.
- Thomas Fowler (1777–1843), invented the thermosiphon for early hot water central heating systems
- Evan Davies (1805–1864), a Welsh Protestant Christian missionary with the London Missionary Society, he worked locally and then among the Chinese in Malaysia in Penang.
- Mary Theresa Vidal (1815-1873), Australia's first female novelist
- William Johnson Cory (1823–1892), educator and poet.
- William Sandford (1841–1932), pioneer of the Australian iron and steel industry.
- William Keble Martin (1877–1969), a local Church of England priest from 1934, botanist and botanical illustrator.

== See also ==
- Great Torrington School
