= Acland =

English surname

Acland is an English surname. The Aclands of Devon (often Dyke Acland: see Acland baronets, Dyke Acland baronets) were an influential family, whose name was derived from Acland near Barnstaple. Notable people with the surname include:

== A ==
- Sir Alexander Hood, 2nd Baronet (1793–1851), MP for Somerset West
- Sir Alexander Fuller-Acland-Hood, 3rd Baronet (1819–1892), MP for Somerset West
- Alexander Fuller-Acland-Hood, 1st Baron St Audries (1853–1917), MP for Wellington
- Alfred Dyke Acland (1858–1937), British army officer, son of Sir Henry Wentworth Acland
- Alice Acland (social activist) (1849–1935), British social activist
- Alice Acland (novelist) (1912–1982), pseudonym of British socialite and author Anne Wignall
- Antony Guy Acland (1916–1983), British army officer and baronet
- Sir Antony Acland (1930–2021), Head of the Diplomatic Service and Provost of Eton
- Sir Arthur Acland (died 1610) (1573–1610) of Acland, Landkey, Devon, knight
- Arthur Floyer-Acland (1885–1980), British soldier
- Sir Arthur Dyke Acland, 13th Baronet (1847–1926), Liberal politician and political author
- Arthur Acland (MP), British Member of Parliament for Barnstaple

== B ==
- Bessie Acland (1870–1959), New Zealand artist

== C ==
- Charles R. Acland (born 1963), Canadian academic and author
- Chris Acland (1966–1996), 1990s Britpop musician
- Clemence Margaret Acland (1889-1973), English nature photographer, ornithologist and researcher

== E ==
- Edward Dyke Acland (1878–1968), British naval officer
- Eleanor Acland (1878–1933), British Liberal politician, suffragist and novelist
- Emily Acland (1830–1905), pioneer settler in New Zealand and watercolour artist

== F ==
- Francis Dyke Acland (1874–1939), British Liberal politician

== G ==
- Gideon Acland (1777–1819), English merchant
- Gilbert Acland-Troyte (1876–1964), British soldier and Conservative Party politician
- Geoffrey Acland (1908–1964), British Liberal Party politician
- Guy Acland (born 1946), British Army officer and member of the British Royal Household

== H ==
- Lady Harriet Acland (1750–1815), wife of John Dyke Acland
- Henry Acland (1815–1900), physician and son of Sir Thomas Acland
- Hubert Acland (1890–1978), British naval officer
- Sir Hugh Acland, 5th Baronet (c. 1639–1714), English baron and member of Parliament
- Sir Hugh Acland, 6th Baronet (1697–1728), English baron
- Sir Hugh Acland (surgeon) (1874–1956), New Zealand surgeon

== J ==
- Sir Jack Acland (Hugh John Acland, 1904–1981), New Zealand politician
- Jack Acland (1904–1981), New Zealand politician of the National Party
- Sir John Acland (died 1620) (c. 1552–1620), English MP for Devon 1607–1614
- John Acland (Callington MP) (c. 1674–1703), English MP for Callington 1702–1703
- John Acland (runholder) (1823–1904), New Zealand politician and runholder
- John Dyke Acland (1746–1778), British Army officer and MP for Callington 1774–1778
- John Palmer-Acland (1756–1831), born John Acland, British MP for Bridgwater
- Sir John Acland, 1st Baronet (c. 1591–1647), English royalist
- Sir John Acland, 3rd Baronet (c. 1636–1655), English baronet
- John Acland (author) (c. 1729–1795), English author
- Sir John Dyke Acland, 8th Baronet (1778–1785), British baronet
- John Acland (British Army officer) (1928–2006), British major-general
- Sir John Dyke Acland, 16th Baronet (1939–2009), British baronet
- John Acland (died 1553) of Acland, Landkey, Devon

== M ==
- Mike Acland (born 1935), English footballer

== P ==
- Peter Acland (1902–1993), son of Alfred Dyke Acland

== R ==
- Reginald Acland (1856–1924), British barrister and judge
- Richard Acland (1679–1729), English politician
- Sir Richard Acland (1906–1990), 15th Baronet, Member of Parliament and one of the founders of UK's Common Wealth Party
- Richard Acland (bishop) (1881–1954), British soldier and Anglican bishop
- Robert D. Acland (1941–2016), son of Sir Richard Acland, and plastic surgeon and microsurgery pioneer

== S ==
- Sarah Acland (1815–1878), wife of Sir Henry Acland
- Sarah Angelina Acland (1849–1930), daughter of Sir Henry Acland and Sarah Acland, and pioneer of colour photography
- Simon Acland (born 1958), son of Sir Antony Acland, British venture capitalist and author
- Stafford Floyer-Acland (1916–1994), British soldier
- Susan Acland-Hood (born 1977), British civil servant

== T ==
- Theodore Acland (1890–1960), English educationist and cleric
- Theodore Dyke Acland (1851–1931), English surgeon and author
- Sir Thomas Dyke Acland, 7th Baronet (1722–1785), MP for Devon 1746–1747 and Somerset 1767–1768
- Sir Thomas Dyke Acland, 9th Baronet (1752–1794), son of the 7th Baronet
- Sir Thomas Dyke Acland, 10th Baronet (1787–1871), MP for Devonshire and Devonshire North, son of the 9th Baronet
- Sir Thomas Dyke Acland, 11th Baronet (1809–1898), MP for Devon North and Somerset West, Privy Counsellor, son of the 10th Baronet
- Sir Thomas Dyke Acland, 12th Baronet (1842–1919), British politician, son of the 11th Baronet

== W ==
- Sir William Acland, 2nd Baronet (1847–1924), Royal Navy admiral
- Sir William Acland, 3rd Baronet (1888–1970), British World War I soldier
- Wroth Palmer Acland (1770–1816), English soldier

== See also ==
- Ackland, English surname
- Acland, Queensland, town in the Toowoomba Region, Australia
- Acland Hospital, Oxford, England
- Mount Acland, mountain in New Zealand
