= Acland baronets of St Mary Magdalen (1890) =

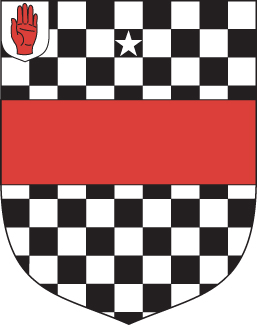
Arms of the Acland baronets of St Mary Magdalen.

The Acland baronetcy, of St Mary Magdalen in Oxford, was created in the Baronetage of the United Kingdom on 16 June 1890 for the physician and scientist Henry Wentworth Acland. He was the fourth son of the 10th Baronet of the 1644/1678 creation.

He was succeeded by his eldest son, the 2nd Baronet, an admiral in the Royal Navy. On his death the title passed to his eldest son, the 3rd Baronet, a lieutenant-colonel in the Royal Devon Yeomanry and a major in the Royal Flying Corps and Royal Air Force. He died without male issue and was succeeded by his younger brother, the 4th Baronet, a captain in the Royal Navy. As of 2026 the title is held by his grandson, the 6th Baronet, who succeeded his father in 1983.

== Acland baronets, of St Mary Magdalen (1890) ==
- Sir Henry Wentworth Dyke Acland, 1st Baronet (1815–1900)
- Sir William Alison Dyke Acland, 2nd Baronet (1847–1924)
- Sir William Henry Dyke Acland, 3rd Baronet (1888–1970)
- Sir Hubert Guy Dyke Acland, 4th Baronet (1890–1978)
- Sir Antony Guy Acland, 5th Baronet (1916–1983)
- Sir (Christopher) Guy (Dyke) Acland, 6th Baronet (born 1946)

The heir apparent is the present holder's son Alexander John Dyke Acland, born 1973. He is an education consultant and founder of the New Edinburgh Orchestra.

== Extended family ==
- Sarah Angelina Acland (1849–1930), the only daughter of the 1st Baronet, was a philanthropist and a pioneer of colour photography, becoming a Fellow of the Royal Photographic Society.
- Sir Reginald Brodie Dyke Acland (1856–1924), fifth son of the 1st Baronet, was a prominent barrister.
- Kenneth Francis Dyke Acland (1890–1975), son of Francis Edward Dyke Acland, sixth son of the 1st Baronet, was a captain in the Royal Navy.
- Peter Bevil Edward Acland (1902–1993), second son of Alfred Dyke Acland, seventh son of the 1st Baronet, was a temporary brigadier in the Army and served as Deputy Lieutenant and Vice-Lord-Lieutenant of Devon. He was the father of Sir John Hugh Bevil Acland (1928–2006), a major-general in the Scots Guards, and the diplomat Sir Antony Arthur Acland.

== Notes ==
Baronetage of the United Kingdom
| Preceded by Hozier baronets | Acland baronets of St Mary Magdalen; 16 June 1890 | Succeeded by Petit baronets |

}
