= William Acland =

William Acland may refer to:

- Sir William Acland, 2nd Baronet (1847–1924), Royal Navy admiral
- Sir William Acland, 3rd Baronet (1888–1970), British World War I soldier
