= Jo Valentine =

Jo Valentine is the name of:

- a pen name for Charlotte Armstrong
- Jo Valentine, Baroness Valentine (born 1958), member of the British House of Lords

== See also ==
- Jo Vallentine (born 1946), Australian Senator
- Joe Valentine (born 1979), baseball player
