= Hugh Acland =

Hugh Acland may refer to:

- Sir Hugh Acland, 5th Baronet (c. 1639–1714), English baron and member of Parliament
- Sir Hugh Acland, 6th Baronet (1697–1728), English baron
- Sir Hugh Acland (surgeon) (1874–1956), New Zealand surgeon
- Sir Jack Acland (Hugh John Acland, 1904–1981), New Zealand politician

== See also ==
- Acland (surname)
