= Charles Yonge =

Charles Yonge may refer to:

- Charles Maurice Yonge (1899–1986), British marine biologist
- Charles Duke Yonge (1812–1891), British historian
