= Clemence Acland =

English photographer, researcher and ornithologist (1889–1973)

- Acland preparing her camera to photograph flycatchers
- Born: 9 October 1889
- Died: 10 March 1973 (aged 83)
- Occupation: Ornithologist
- Parent(s): Francis Edward Dyke Acland; Marion Sarah Macrorie
- Branch: Voluntary Aid Detachment

Clemence Margaret Acland (1889–1973) was an English nature photographer, ornithologist and researcher in bacteriology.

== Early life ==
Acland was born in Chelsea, London, on 9 October 1889 to Marion Sarah (née Macrorie) and Francis Edward Dyke Acland. Her father was a gunnery experimental officer with the Royal Artillery, described in an obituary as "one of the pioneers of modern gunnery", and later a civil engineer. Her paternal grandfather was Sir Henry Wentworth Dyke Acland, 1st Baronet, KCB FRS, a physician and Regius Professor of Medicine at the University of Oxford. Through him and his wife Sarah Acland (daughter of William Cotton), she was related to number of notable members of the Acland family. Her maternal grandfather was William Macrorie, bishop of Maritzburg.

She had two brothers (one younger than her) and an older sister. When she was four, the family moved to Banstead, Surrey.

Acland was interested in birds from an early age, and would sometimes truant from school to watch them.

She served as a civilian bacteriological assistant in France in the First World War, with the Voluntary Aid Detachment.

== Career ==
From 1920 to 1929 Acland was a research assistant in the Tuberculosis Department of the Welsh National School of Medicine at Cardiff, under Professor S. Lyle Cummins, with whom she co-authored some papers.

She spent much of her life caring for her mother and sister.

During World War Two, she served as an ambulance driver.

== Ornithology ==
As early as 1910, Acland took part in bird ringing programmes devised by Harry Witherby.

In 1923, she was the first person to record differences in the bill patterns of Bewick's Swans.

In 1924, with H. Morrey Salmon she carried out the first photographic census of a Gannet colony, that on Grassholm.

She was also active as a leader for the scouts and guides, leading field trips, and in September 1927 she gave a talk, "Bird Study For Guides in Autumn and Winter", on the BBC's 5WA Cardiff radio station. In October 1928 she gave another, "For Girl Guides: Wild Nature Seen During Camp", and the following March another, "For Girl Guides: The Coming of Spring in the Bird World".

Acland was one of only a handful of women to attend the 7th International Ornithological Congress in Oxford in 1934. At that time she was voluntary warden at the Royal Society for the Protection of Birds's reserves at Minsmere and Havergate.

In 1935, she exhibited her work—alongside 12 other women and 74 men—at the International Exhibition of Nature Photography at the Natural History Museum in London. The exhibition included her photograph of an Avocet feigning injury to distract from its nest. That picture was also featured in an edition of Country Life.

She served as a member of the editorial committee (Note: The committee was chaired by R. C. Homes and also included C. B. Ashby, C. L. Collenette, R. S. R. Fitter, E. R. Parrinder and B. A. Richards.) for the London Natural History Society's publication The Birds of the London Area since 1900, published in 1957 as part of the New Naturalist series. She gave professional lectures on birds, illustrated with her own photographs.

In 1960, aged 70, she drove with fellow ornithologist Violet Maxse 10,000 miles (16,000 km) from Durban to Nairobi in a truck-caravan, taking six months to do so. She had made a previous visit to Africa, and had been inside the Arctic Circle on three journeys.

== Recognition ==
In 1926 Acland was elected a member of the Zoological Photographic Club, becoming a life member in 1958, and in 1928 she was elected a Member of the British Ornithological Union. She was also a member of the British Ornithologists' Club.

== Death and legacy ==
Acland died at Banstead, on 10 March 1973 at age 83, never having married. Obituaries were published in Ibis, and in The London Naturalist.

Her papers, largely comprising diaries and birding notebooks, are held by the Bodleian Library. Her lantern slides and glass plate negatives are in the archives of the British Trust for Ornithology.

== Selected papers ==
- Acland, Clemence M.; Salmon, H. Morrey. "The Grassholm Gannets In 1924 – A Great Increase". British Birds. 18 (7): 178–185.
- Acland, C. M. (1925). "An Improved Method of Mounting Pathologial Specimens in Flat Celluloid Cases". The Journal of Pathology and Bacteriology. 28 (3): 523–525.
- Cummins, S. L.; Acland, C. M. (1927). "An analysis of blood-sedimentation tests and nuclear indices in 200 classified cases of tuberculosis". Tubercle. 9 (1): 1–9.
- Cummins, S. L.; Davies, D.; Acland, C. M. (1929). "Living Tubercle Bacilli in a Septic Tank Effluent". Tubercle. 10 (7): 310–312.
