= John Ackland =

John Ackland may refer to:

- John Ackland (politician) (1890–1958), Australian politician
- John Ackland (rugby league) (born 1958), rugby league coach, scout and former player for New Zealand

== See also ==
- Ackland
