= Sanger Shepherd =

British photographic process and company

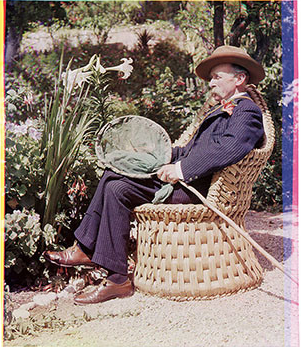
A 1903 Sanger Shepherd process photograph of Col. Willoughby Verner by Sarah Angelina Acland, an English early pioneer colour photographer.

Sanger Shepherd and Company Limited was an electrical goods and photographic company that developed the Sanger Shepherd process for taking colour photographs. The company led by Edward Sanger Shepherd was active from 1900 until 1927.

Sarah Angelina Acland of Oxford, England, used the process among others for her early colour photography at the beginning of the 20th century, with examples held at the Museum of the History of Science, Oxford. The process involved taking separate photographs through red, green, and blue coloured filters and then combining them later. A complete outfit cost £9/6/6 (£9.32^{1}/_{2}p).

The dye inhibition method of colour photography which underpinned the Sanger-Shepherd process set a pathway for future processes, notably Kodak's Dye-Transfer process of 1946.

== See also ==
- Colour photography
- History of photography
