= Harry Morrey Salmon =

Harry Morrey Salmon CBE MC DL (20 December 1891 – 27 April 1985) was a Welsh naturalist and army officer famed for his work in his own country and for his bird photography. He served in World War I and World War II, rising to the rank of colonel.

== Life and career ==
Salmon was born in Cardiff, the first son of Harry Edgar Salmon and Florence Isabella née Thurston. His paternal grandmother was Jane Susan Morrey and his father owned the South Wales India Rubber Company. He started his career as a photographer in 1909, joined the Cardiff Naturalists' Society in 1910, and had become a published author by 1914. He was hailed as the "Welsh ornithologist of the century" and as "the father of British bird photography." His photographic career started in 1908. He was the first to record the nocturnal activities of Manx Shearwater on the Pembrokeshire Islands and in 1924, together with Clemence Acland, he achieved another first by using his skill with a camera in choppy seas to obtain a census of the large colonies of Gannet on Grassholm. These memorable early photographs were used as illustrations in Birds in Britain Today which he and Geoffrey Ingram published in 1934. They travelled widely using a Godfrey-Nash car after World War I. He was also a notable conservationist and in 1961 was responsible for the first proposal that the island of Flat Holm in the Bristol Channel should become a nature reserve, and in 1975 it was so designated. He was a key figure in the conservation of the Red Kite in Wales, working along with the photographer Arthur Brook (1886-1957). Salmon and Ingram worked on Birds in Britain Today (1934).

Salmon was a member of the 4th Cardiff Scout Troop and he enlisted in the Territorial Battalion of the Welch regiment, cycling fifty miles a day in 1912. In 1914 he served on guard duty on the east coast between Aberdeen and Arbroath. and in 1915 he was sent to the Western Front with the 3rd Battalion of the Welch Regiment. In 1916 he served as an intelligence officer in Ypres. He carried a pocket camera and took nearly 250 photos on the Western Front. He had a distinguished military career in the British army rising to the rank of captain in World War I. In 1919 he returned to work as a director of his father's rubber company.

During World War II, he was recalled to the Welch Regiment and was involved in training recruits. He was posted as Command Defence Officer at Northwood Coastal Command. He was made Commander-designate for troops sent to North Africa. He was promoted to the rank of colonel at the end of World War II. He received the Military Cross and bar and was appointed a Commander of the Order of the British Empire (CBE) in recognition of his distinguished contribution to operations in the Mediterranean from November 1942 until May 1945.

He served as the treasurer of the National Museum of Wales from 1962 until 1982. In 1972 he received the RSPB gold medal for his work on the red kite. He received an honorary DSc from the University of Wales in 1982.

Salmon married Violet "Queenie" Evans (1896-1978) and they had two sons. He died of a heart attack and was buried in a family plot at St Mary's Church, Whitchurch in Cardiff.
