= Charles Wiggin =

British diplomat

Sir Charles Douglas Wiggin KCMG DFC AFC (26 September 1922 – 8 March 1977) was a British diplomat who was ambassador to Spain.

== Career ==
Charles Douglas Wiggin was educated at Eton College and Christ Church, Oxford. He served in the Royal Air Force Volunteer Reserve during World War II, then joined the Diplomatic Service in 1946. Between posts at the Foreign Office (later the Foreign and Commonwealth Office, FCO) he served at the embassies in Santiago, Stockholm, Tehran and Washington, D.C. He was private secretary to Edward Heath, who was Lord Privy Seal and deputy Foreign Secretary, 1961–63 and briefly to Lord Carrington in 1963. He then attended the Imperial Defence College, served again at Tehran and as head of department at the FCO, and finally as ambassador to Spain 1974–77.

Wiggin was appointed CMG in 1968 and knighted KCMG during his posting to Spain.

== Family ==
In 1948 Wiggin married Marie Thérèse Elizabeth Leche in Santiago, Chile, where her father, Sir John Leche, was British ambassador at the time. They had three daughters.

Through his mother, Carmen Fernandez Vallin y Parrella, Wiggin inherited the title of Marqués de Muros (Muros de Nalón, Asturias, Spain, where he was born).

== Honours and awards ==
- On 3 March 1944 Acting Flight Lieutenant Charles Douglas Wiggin of No. 44 Squadron RAF (Note: 44 Squadron flew the four-engined Avro Lancaster heavy bomber from RAF Waddington) was awarded the Distinguished Flying Cross:

Throughout his tour of operations, which includes 8 attacks on Berlin, this officer has set a fine example of skill, courage and determination. During a recent attack on the German capital his aircraft was badly damaged in a fight with 2 enemy aircraft. Nevertheless, Flight Lieutenant Wiggin pressed home his bombing attack with great resolution and afterwards flew the damaged bomber to base where he executed a perfect crash landing, although one of his landing wheelshad been shot away. He is a fine leader whose example has imbued his crew with great confidence.

— London Gazette

Diplomatic posts
Preceded by Sir John Russell	Ambassador Extraordinary and Plenipotentiary to the Spanish State; 1974–1977	Succeeded by Antony Acland
