= Jo Valentine, Baroness Valentine =

British House of Lords

The Right Honourable The Baroness Valentine
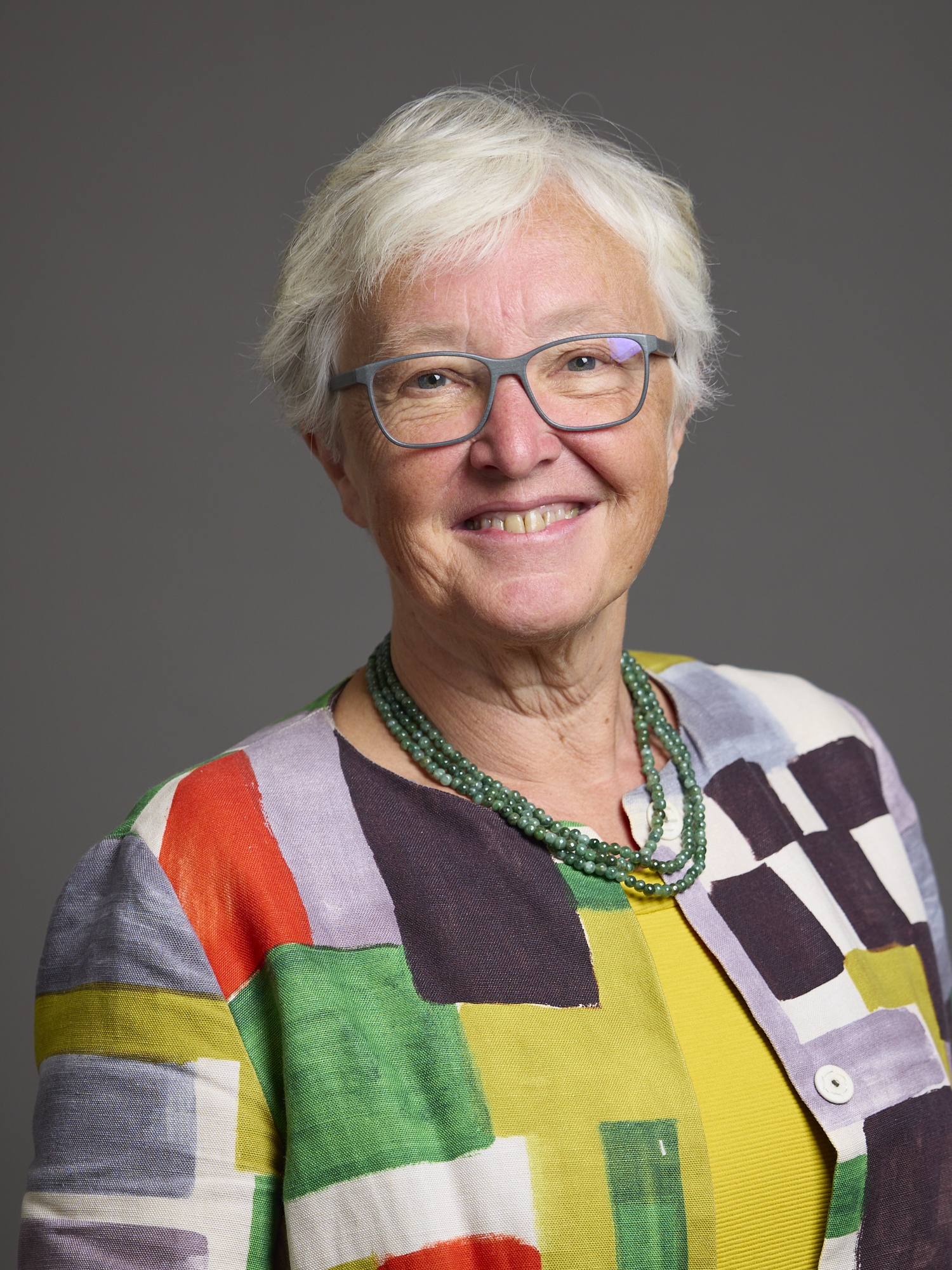
- Official parliamentary portrait, 2024

Member of the House of Lords
- Lord Temporal
- Life peerage 10 October 2005

Personal details
- Born: 8 December 1958 (age 67)
- Party: Crossbencher
- Education: St Paul's Girls' School
- Alma mater: St Hugh's College, Oxford

Josephine Clare Valentine, Baroness Valentine (born 8 December 1958) is a Crossbench member of the British House of Lords.

== Career ==
Baroness Valentine's career spans the City, industry, campaigning and regeneration. She has a portfolio career, working for Business in the Community, seeking to improve economic and social outcomes for some of Britain's “forgotten” towns. Her non-executive roles include vice chair of UCL, non-executive director of Value and Indexed Property Income Trust and chair of Heathrow Southern Railway.

Lady Valentine previously ran London First for many years. She joined the organisation in 1997 as Managing Director, becoming Chief Executive in 2003. London First's mission is to make London the best place in the world in which to do business. Its members include leading retailers, investment banks and property companies. Whilst at London First, Lady Valentine was instrumental in the creation of Teach First, campaigning for Crossrail and the Olympics and championing the development of the South Bank of the Thames. Lady Valentine stood down from the organisation in 2016.

Prior to London First, Lady Valentine worked in corporate finance at Barings Bank, where she became the first female manager. In 1988, on secondment from Barings, she established and ran 'The Blackburn Partnership', a public-private partnership to regenerate Blackburn, Lancashire. In 1990 she joined The BOC Group to head the corporate finance and planning function, leaving in 1995 to establish the Central London Partnership (CLP). She worked in Blackpool for two years from 2017, which successfully bid to become one of the first and largest town deals.

She has held many non-executive roles including Peabody Housing Association, HS2, Crossrail, and was on the National Lottery Commission. She was recommended by the House of Lords Appointments Commission to be created a life peer, taking the title Baroness Valentine, of Putney in the London Borough of Wandsworth on 10 October 2005.

== Education and family ==
Lady Valentine was educated at St Paul's Girls' School and St Hugh's College, Oxford, where she read Maths and Philosophy. She is an Honorary Fellow of St Hugh's and of Birkbeck College and holds honorary degrees from the University of London and Roehampton. She is married to venture capitalist and author Simon Acland, son of Sir Antony Acland, the former British Ambassador to Washington. They have two daughters, Eloise Acland and Isabel Acland.
