= Reginald Acland =

British barrister and judge (1856–1924)

Sir Reginald Brodie Dyke Acland, KC, JP (18 May 1856 – 18 February 1924) was a British barrister and judge.

== Background ==
He was the sixth son of Sir Henry Wentworth Acland, 1st Baronet, and his wife Sarah Cotton, eldest daughter of William Cotton. His younger brother was Alfred Dyke Acland. He was educated at Winchester College and then at University College, Oxford, where he graduated with a Bachelor of Arts in 1878 and Master of Arts five year later.

== Career ==
In 1881, Acland was called to the bar by the Inner Temple and worked as barrister-at-law. He became junior counsel to the Admiralty in 1897 and subsequently was appointed Judge Advocate of the Fleet in 1904. Acland was appointed Recorder of Shrewsbury in November 1901, a post he held for the next two years. He then served as Recorder of Oxford until his death in 1924.

He was nominated a King's Counsel in 1904 and acted as counsel for Great Britain at the North Sea Commission in Paris in the following year. In 1913, he was elected a member of the Royal Commission for Legal Delay and became a Bencher. A year later, he was created a Knight Bachelor. Acland sat in the General Council of the Bar and was treasurer of the Barristers' Benevolent Association. He was Justice of the Peace for Berkshire and chaired the London Hospital Saturday Fund.

== Family ==
On 12 August 1885, Acland married Helen Emma Fox, daughter of Reverend Thomas Fox, and had by her four children, two sons and two daughters. The family lived at Thirtover in the village of Cold Ash, West Berkshire, where the Acland Memorial Hall was built on land donated to the village by the Acland family.

== Works ==
- Chisholm, Hugh, ed. (1922). "Prisoners of War" . Encyclopædia Britannica (12th ed.). London & New York: The Encyclopædia Britannica Company.

Legal offices
Preceded by Arthur Richard Jelf	Recorder of Shrewsbury; 1901–1903	Succeeded by John William St Lawrence Leslie
Preceded by Hon. Alfred Lyttelton	Recorder of Oxford; 1903–1924	Succeeded by The Lord Trevethin
Preceded by Alexander Stavely Hill	Judge Advocate of the Fleet; 1904 – 1924	Succeeded by Charles Murray Pitman
