= Antony Acland =

British diplomat (1930–2021)

Sir Antony Acland KG GCMG GCVO
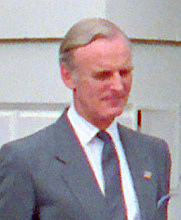
- Acland in 1987

British Ambassador to the United States
- In office 1986–1991
- Monarch: Elizabeth II
- Prime Minister: Margaret Thatcher; John Major
- Preceded by: Sir Oliver Wright
- Succeeded by: Sir Robin Renwick

Permanent Under-Secretary of State for Foreign Affairs
- In office 1982–1986
- Foreign Sec.: The Lord Carrington; Francis Pym; Sir Geoffrey Howe
- Preceded by: Sir Michael Palliser
- Succeeded by: The Lord Wright of Richmond

British Ambassador to Spain
- In office 1977–1980
- Monarch: Elizabeth II
- Prime Minister: James Callaghan; Margaret Thatcher
- Preceded by: Sir Charles Wiggin
- Succeeded by: Sir Richard Parsons

British Ambassador to Luxembourg
- In office 1975–1977
- Monarch: Elizabeth II
- Prime Minister: Harold Wilson; James Callaghan
- Preceded by: John Roper
- Succeeded by: The Lord Wright of Richmond

Principal Private Secretary to the Foreign Secretary
- In office 1972–1975
- Foreign Sec.: Alec Douglas-Home; James Callaghan
- Preceded by: John Graham
- Succeeded by: Stephen Barrett

Personal details
- Born: Anthony Arthur Acland; 12 March 1930
- Died: 8 September 2021 (aged 91)
- Spouses: Clare Anne Verdon (m. 1956; died 1984) Jennifer McGougan (m. 1987)
- Children: 3, including Simon
- Parent: Peter Acland (father)
- Education: Eton College
- Alma mater: Christ Church, Oxford
- Awards: Knight Companion of the Order of the Garter (2001); Knight Grand Cross of the Order of St Michael and St George (1986); Knight Grand Cross of the Royal Victorian Order (1991)

Sir Antony Arthur Acland (12 March 1930 – 8 September 2021) was a British diplomat and a provost of Eton College.

== Early life ==
Antony Acland was the second son of Bridget Susan (Barnett) and Brigadier Peter Acland. He was educated at Eton College, then in 1948 joined the Royal Artillery with a post-war "emergency commission". After short army service he went up to Christ Church, Oxford, gaining a BA degree in Philosophy, Politics and Economics in 1953 (later upgraded to MA). After leaving Oxford in 1953 he went straight into the Foreign Office (FO).

== Career ==
After studying at the Middle East Centre for Arab Studies, Acland was posted to Dubai and then Kuwait, then back to the FO as Assistant Private Secretary to the Foreign Secretary (Selwyn Lloyd, then Alec Douglas-Home) 1959–62. He then served at the UK Mission to the UN, first in New York City 1962–66, then at Geneva 1966–68. Back at the Foreign and Commonwealth Office (FCO) he was head of the Arabian department 1970–72.

Acland was Principal Private Secretary to the Foreign Secretary (Alec Douglas-Home, then James Callaghan) 1972–75. He was Ambassador to Luxembourg 1975–77 and to Spain 1977–79. He was Deputy Under-Secretary at the FCO 1979–82, a post which then entailed chairing the Joint Intelligence Committee. In 1982 he was promoted to Permanent Under-Secretary and head of the Diplomatic Service. Argentina invaded the Falkland Islands in April 1982 and Acland came into collision with the Prime Minister, Margaret Thatcher, over the diplomatic response. At one point during a heated discussion he threatened to resign, whereupon Thatcher backed down and said "All right, no more Foreign Office bashing."

Acland was Ambassador to the United States at Washington, D.C., 1986–91, then retired from the Diplomatic Service and was Provost of Eton College 1991–2000.

Acland was a member of the Founding Council of the Rothermere American Institute at Oxford, helping to raise funds for the institute's building and library.

== Honours ==
Acland was appointed Companion of the Order of St Michael and St George in the 1976 New Year Honours and made a Knight Commander of the Royal Victorian Order in November of that year after the Queen's state visit to Luxembourg, after which he was styled "Sir Antony Acland". He was given the additional knighthood of Knight Commander of the Order of St Michael and St George in the 1982 Birthday Honours and promoted to Knight Grand Cross of that same order in the 1986 Birthday Honours and Knight Grand Cross of the Royal Victorian Order in the 1991 Birthday Honours. He was Chancellor of the Order of St Michael and St George between 1994 and 2005. In 2001, he was given the rare honour of appointment as a Knight Companion of the Order of the Garter.

== Personal life ==
In 1956, Acland married Clare Anne Verdon; they had a daughter and two sons, including Simon Acland. Clare died in 1984; in 1987, he married Jennifer McGougan.

He died in September 2021, at the age of 91. His death came one day before that of fellow Knight Companion of the Garter Sir Timothy Colman.

== Arms ==
Coat of arms of Sir Antony Arthur Acland, KG, GCMG, GCVO
Notes Knight since 1986 Crest Upon a hand Argent and Sable, a falcon Argent. Torse Mantling Sable doubled Argent. Escutcheon Chequy Argent and Sable a fess Gules in chief a mullet of five points Argent. Orders The Order of the Garter circlet; Order of St Michael and St George; Royal Victorian Order Banner The banner of Sir Antony Acland's arms used as Knight Companion of the Garter depicted at St George's Chapel.

== Ancestry ==
Ancestors of Antony Acland

8. Sir Henry Acland, 1st Baronet
4. Col. Alfred Dyke Acland
9. Sarah Cotton, Lady Acland
2. Brig. Peter Acland
10. William Henry Smith
5. Hon. Beatrice Danvers Smith
11. Emily Danvers, Viscountess Hambleden
1. Sir Antony Acland
12. Henry Barnett
6. Rev. Herbert Walter Barnett
13. Emily Ann Stratton
3. Bridget Susan Barnett
14. Charles Lethbridge
7. Mary Lethbridge
15. Susan Anne Yarburgh

Diplomatic posts
Preceded by John Graham	Principal Private Secretary to the Foreign Secretary; 1972–1975	Succeeded by Stephen Barrett
Preceded by John Roper	Ambassador Extraordinary and Plenipotentiary to the Grand Duchy of Luxembourg; 1975–1977	Succeeded by Patrick Wright
Preceded by Sir Charles Wiggin	Ambassador to Spain; 1977–1980	Succeeded by Sir Richard Parsons
Preceded by Sir Michael Palliser	Permanent Under-Secretary of State for Foreign Affairs; 1982–1986	Succeeded by Sir Patrick Wright
Preceded by Sir Oliver Wright	Ambassador to the United States; 1986–1991	Succeeded by Sir Robin Renwick
Academic offices
Preceded by Lord Charteris of Amisfield	Provost of Eton; 1991–2000	Succeeded by Sir Eric Anderson
