= Park Town, Oxford =

Area of Oxford, England

Coordinates: 51.766°N 1.261°W

Park Town
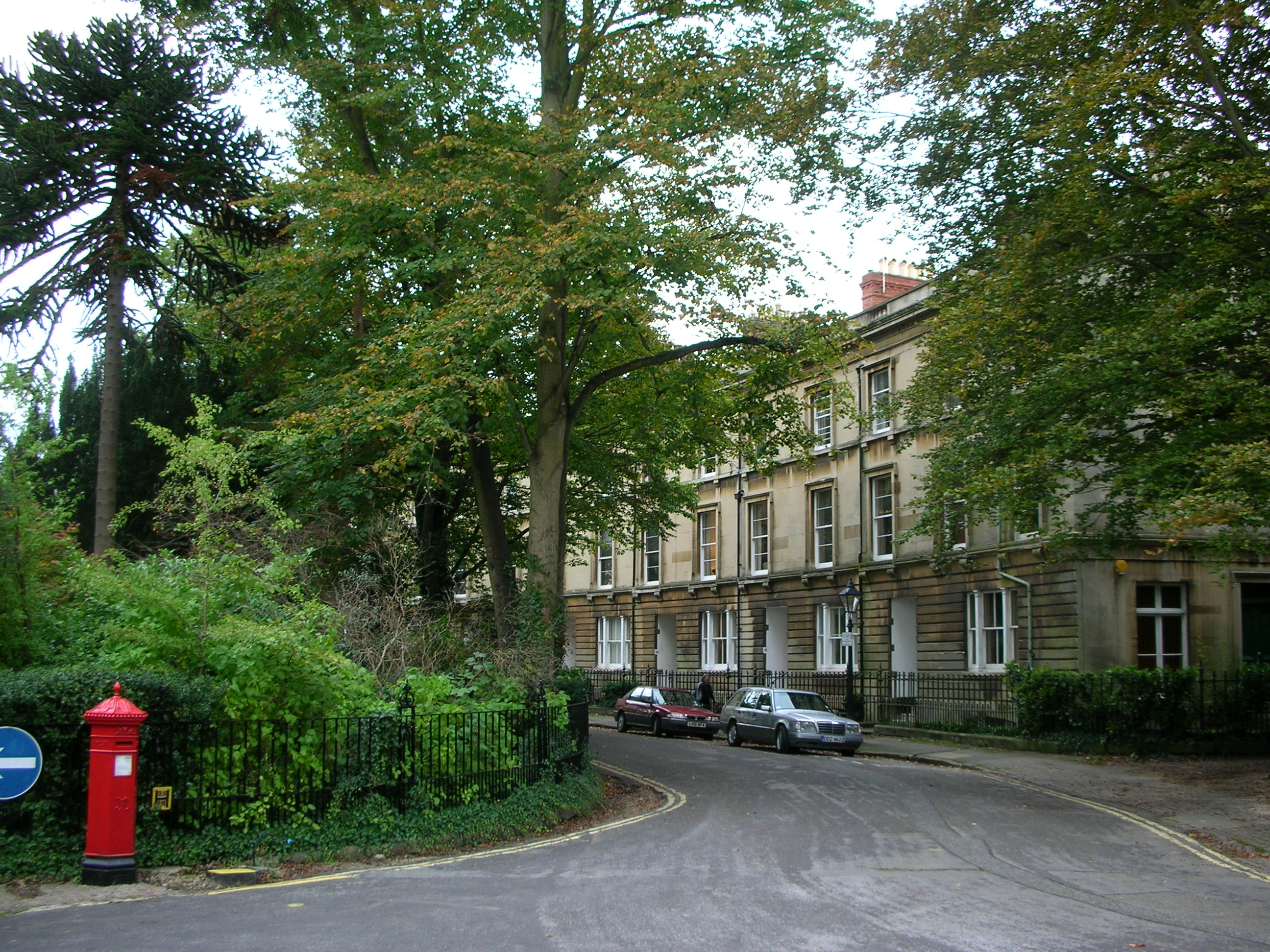
- The main crescent of Park Town

- Location within Oxfordshire
- OS grid reference: SP512078
- Civil parish: Unparished
- District: Oxford
- Shire county: Oxfordshire
- Region: South East
- Country: England
- Sovereign state: United Kingdom
- Post town: Oxford
- Postcode district: OX2
- Dialling code: 01865
- Police: Thames Valley
- Fire: Oxfordshire
- Ambulance: South Central
- UK Parliament: Oxford West and Abingdon
- Website: Oxford City Council

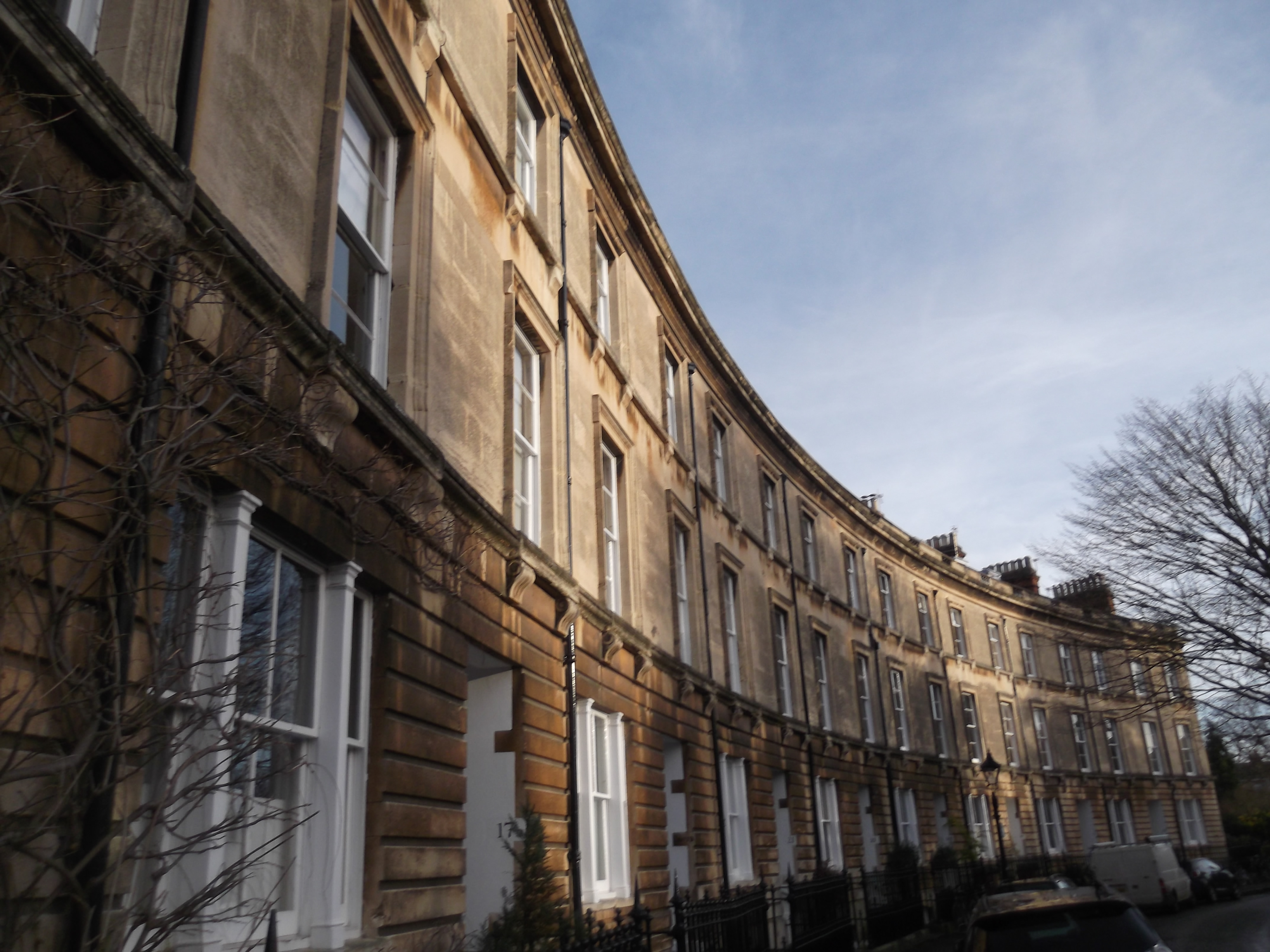
Terraced houses on the north side of the main crescent of Park Town.

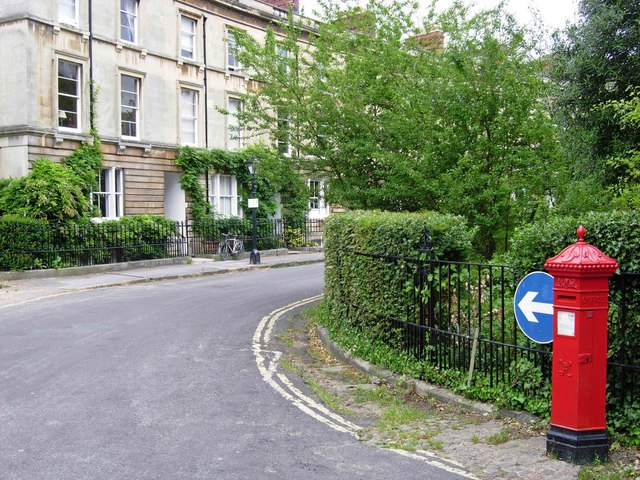
North side of the main Park Town crescent, with a traditional Victorian Penfold-style hexagonal pillar box.

Park Town is a small residential area in central North Oxford, a suburb of Oxford, England. It was one of the earliest planned suburban developments in the area and most of the houses are Grade II listed.

== History ==
Samuel Lipscomb Seckham (1827–1900) developed the houses in the main crescent in 1853–54, with Bath stone front elevations, and the west-facing crescent with an elevated pavement known as "The Terrace" in 1854–55. The Park Town Estate Company was formed in September 1857 through Seckham's efforts.

Many of the houses and gardens in Park Town were originally surrounded by ornamental iron railings. Those for the detached houses were removed for war use in the Second World War but some have been restored. The Friends of Park Town restored the railings and lanterns around the central garden in the middle of the main Park Town crescent and received an award for the project from the Oxford Preservation Trust in 1977.

== Location ==
Park Town includes two crescents of town houses, surrounding communal gardens and a number of larger villas.

To the west is Banbury Road with Canterbury Road on the opposite side and to the east is the Dragon School. St Anne's College has student accommodation here.

== Individual houses ==
Miss Sarah Angelina Acland (1849–1930), daughter of Sir Henry Wentworth Acland, lived for the latter part of her life and died at her home in (then No. 7) Park Town, recorded by a blue plaque in 2016. Her interest in colour photography at the turn of the 20th century produced a number of significant early examples, which are held at the History of Science Museum in central Oxford, a number of which were taken in Park Town.

No. 5 Park Town was the second home of the Central Labour College (1910–1911) before it moved to 11–13 Penywern Road, Earls Court, London.

== Notable residents ==
Former residents include:

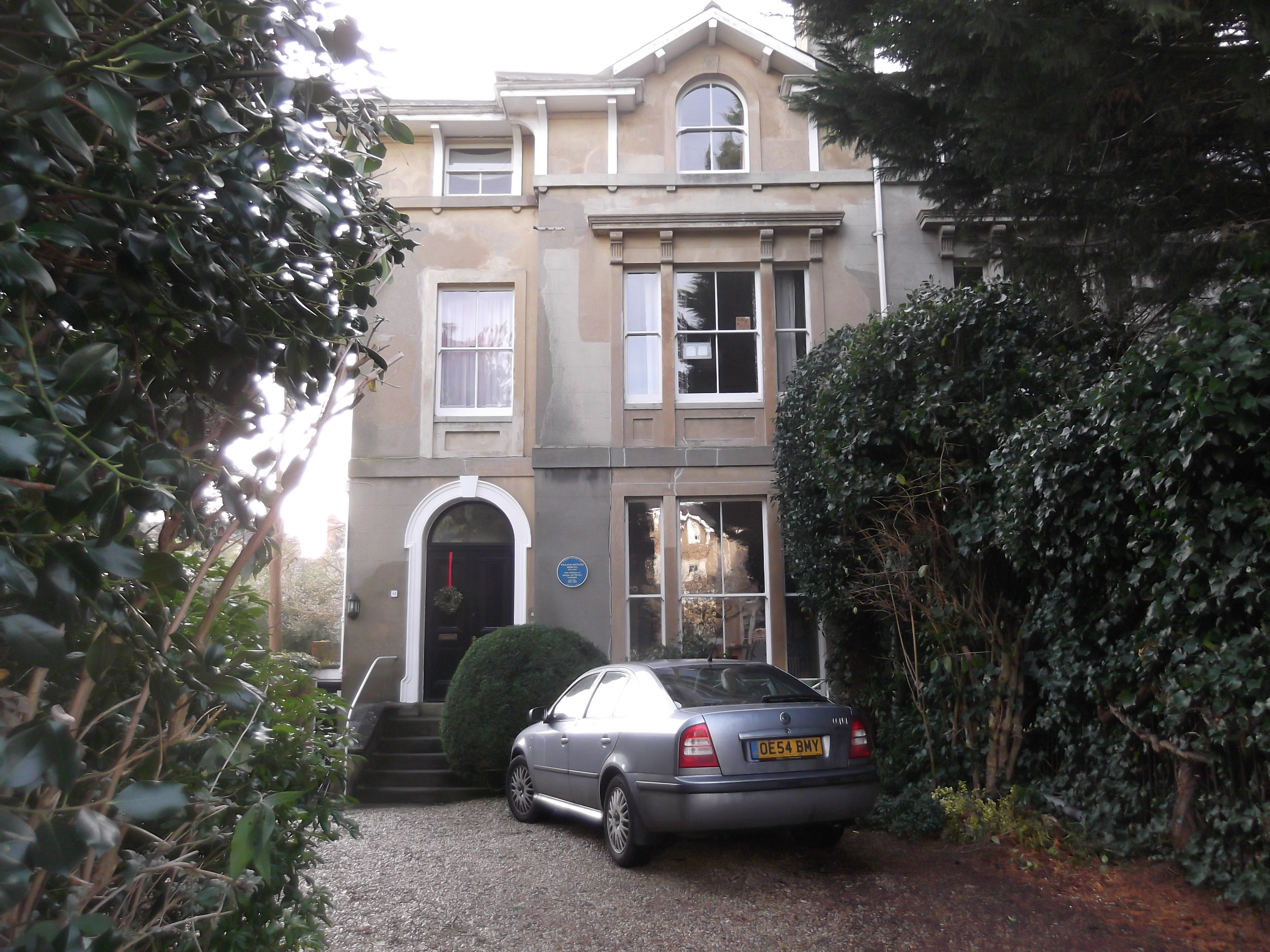
The W. R. Morfill house at 42 Park Town, with blue plaque

- Sarah Angelina Acland (1849–1930), pioneer colour photographer.
- Edmund Bowen FRS (1898–1980), chemist and Fellow of University College.
- Godfrey Rolles Driver CBE, FBA (1892–1975), orientalist and Fellow of Magdalen College.
- Professor Sir Michael Dummett (1925–2011), philosopher and anti-racism campaigner, All Souls College, New College, Wykeham Professor of Logic.

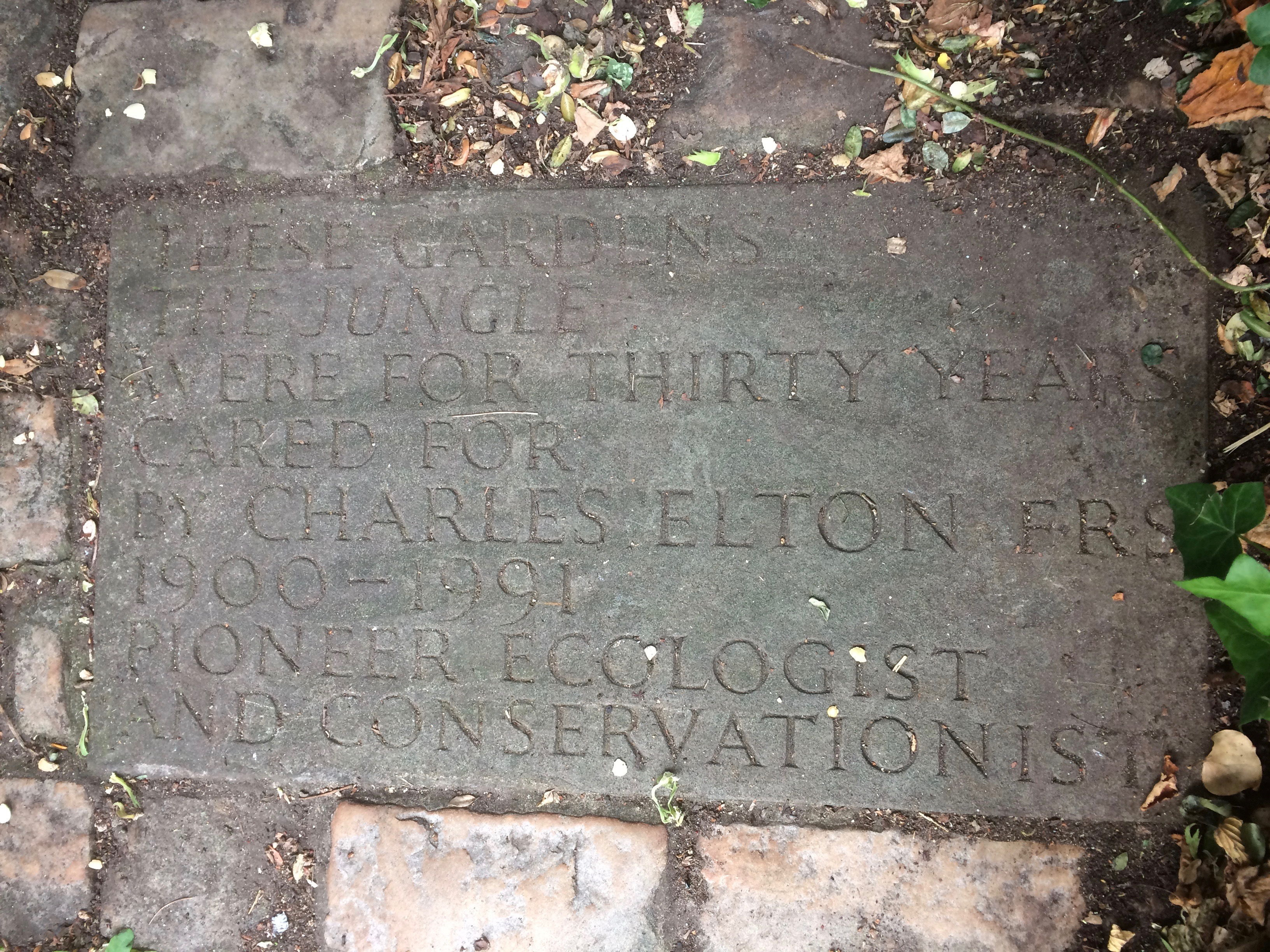
Memorial to Charles Elton FRS in Park Town

- Charles Sutherland Elton FRS (1900–1991), zoologist, ecologist and Fellow of Corpus Christi College.
- John Flemming (1941–2003), economist and Warden of Wadham College.
- James Clerk Maxwell Garnett CBE (1880–1958), educationist and Secretary of the League of Nations.
- Aung San Suu Kyi (born 1945), Myanmar State Counsellor.
- Ian McEwan (born 1948), Booker Prize winning novelist.
- William Richard Morfill (1834–1909), first Professor of Russian and Slavonic Languages at Oxford, lived at number 42 and is commemorated by a blue plaque.
- Leonid Pasternak (1862–1945), Russian painter, spent the last six years of his life living with his daughter Lydia Pasternak Slater (1902–1989), chemist and poet, at No. 20. Leonid Pasternak was the father of Boris Pasternak, poet and author of Doctor Zhivago, but he remained in Russia until his death. Ann Pasternak Slater, academic and translator, is the daughter of Lydia Pasternak Slater.
- Rupert Spira (born 1960), spiritual teacher and philosopher.

== Sources and further reading ==
- Chance, Eleanor; Colvin, Christina; Cooper, Janet; Day, C.J.; Hassall, T.G.; Selwyn, Nesta (1979). Crossley, Alan; Elrington, C.R. (eds.). A History of the County of Oxford. Victoria County History. Vol. 4: The City of Oxford.
- Hinchcliffe, Tanis (1992). North Oxford. New Haven: Yale University Press. ISBN 0-300-05184-0.
- Kelly, Frederic Festus, ed. (1976). "Park Town". Kelly's Directory of Oxford (68th ed.). Kingston-upon-Thames: Kelly's Directory. p. 417.
- Sherwood, Jennifer; Pevsner, Nikolaus (1974). Oxfordshire. The Buildings of England. Harmondsworth: Penguin Books. pp. 320–321. ISBN 0-14-071045-0.
- Spokes Symonds, Ann (1998). "Families". The Changing Faces of North Oxford. Vol. Book One. Witney: Robert Boyd Publications. pp. 81–83, 95–96. ISBN 1-899536-25-6.
- Tyack, Geoffrey (1998). Oxford An Architectural Guide. Oxford & New York: Oxford University Press. pp. 215–216. ISBN 0-19-817423-3.
