= London Natural History Society =

UK natural history society

The London Natural History Society (or LNHS as it is commonly known) is a local natural history society within the UK concerned with recording the wildlife of London, covering a circular area covering a 20-mile radius from St. Paul's Cathedral. The society aims include to foster the appreciation and study of London's wildlife and natural environment and assisting in the conservation of wildlife in the London area by helping to record London's wildlife. Society activities include running both indoor and outdoor events throughout the year and producing a number of publications, including the annual London Naturalist and London Bird Report. The LNHS library is housed at the Natural History Museum, London.

== History ==
The LNHS traces its roots back to 1858 when the Haggerstone Entomological Society was founded in June of that year. By the end of the year, it had 35 members, who met one evening per week in the Carpenters' Arms, a pub in Haggerston. By 1887 the society had changed its name to The City of London Entomological and Natural History Society and had moved to a more central meeting point at Albion Hall.

In 1886 four boys at the Grocers' Company School in Hackney founded the Clapton Naturalists' Field Club, which met in members' houses. This society grew rapidly, and in 1892 changed its name to the North London Natural History Society. It covered all branches of natural history, a term which at that time was understood to include all the natural sciences including astronomy, meteorology and geology. In 1893 the Society admitted ladies for the first time. Local groups were formed in some parts of London, and the programme of activities included field trips, regular indoor meetings, exhibitions, and even music recitals and fund-raising dances.

In 1913 the City of London Entomological and Natural History Society and the North London Natural History Society merged and the London Natural History Society was formed, its study area being set as a 20-mile circle around St Paul's Cathedral (as it still stands today).

== Society Sections ==
The LNHS is split into 5 sections, each focusing with a specific biological recording aim:

- Bookham Common Survey Section
- Botany Section
- Ecology & Entomology Section
- Hampstead Heath Survey Section
- London Bird Club
