= George Edward Yonge =

English cricketer

George Edward Yonge (/jʌŋ/; 4 July 1824 – 27 December 1904) was an English barrister, and an amateur cricketer who played from 1844 to 1853.

== Life ==
He was the fourth son of the Rev. Charles Yonge, and younger brother of Charles Duke Yonge. He was educated at Eton College, where he captained the school XI in 1843, and matriculated at Trinity College, Oxford in July 1843, graduating B.A. in 1848, M.A. in 1850. He became a barrister of the Middle Temple in 1853.

A fast roundarm bowler (unknown hand) who was mainly associated with Oxford University, he made 26 known appearances and took 146 wickets. He played for the Gentlemen in the Gentlemen v Players series.

Yonge married 6 October 1859, at St George's Bloomsbury, Lucy, daughter of Gideon Acland of Tiverton, Devon. They had one son, George Acland Yonge, who was born on 23 September 1868 and died 6 October 1870.

Yonge became Treasurer of Southampton (Hants) County. He died 8 December 1904, at Stoke Lodge, Bishopstoke Eastleigh in Hampshire. He is incorrectly called Gerald on many web sites.
