= The Mount (Gibraltar) =

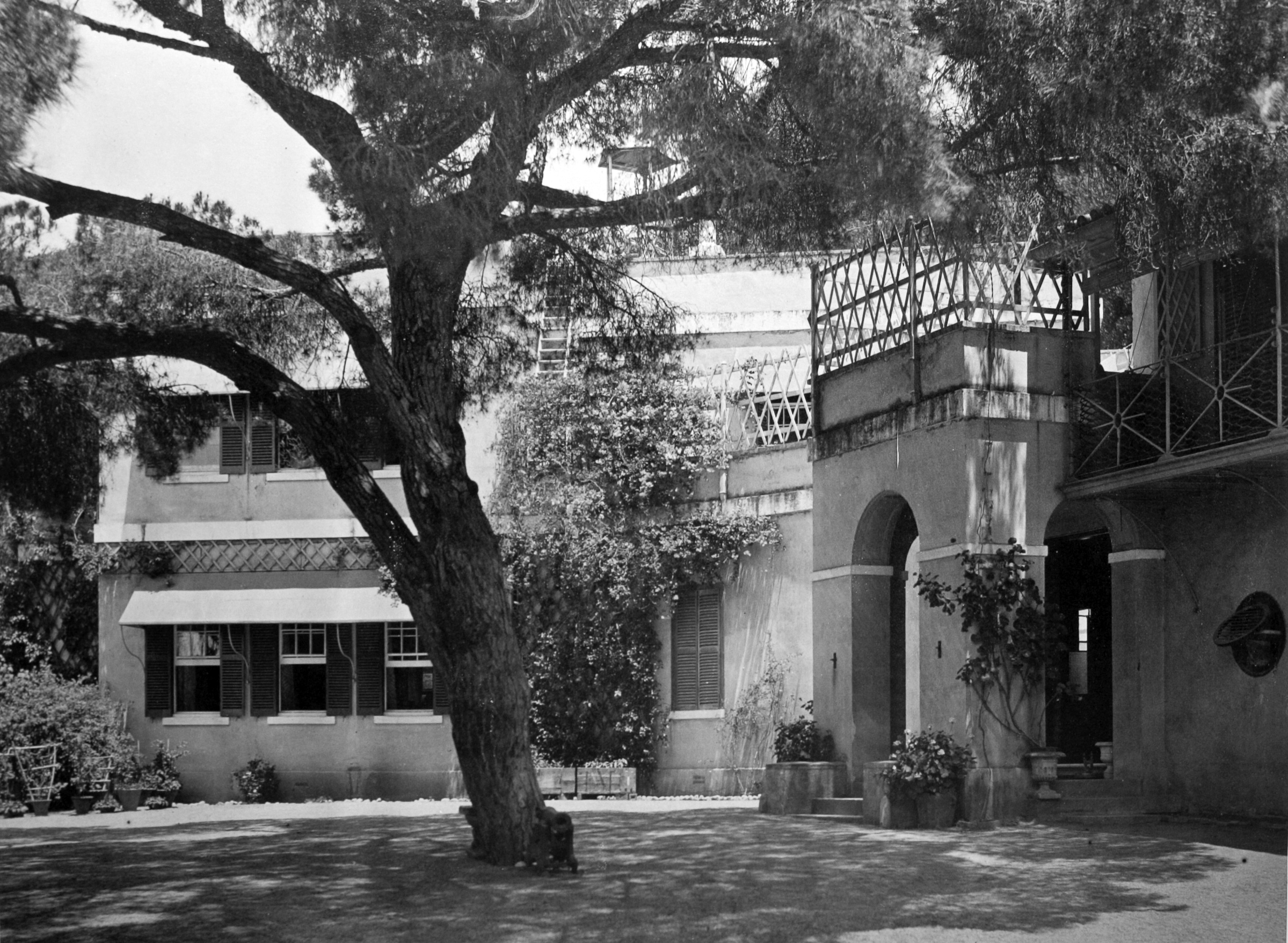
- The Mount in 1879

- Location within Gibraltar

General information
- Type: Official residence
- Architectural style: Georgian
- Location: Europa Road, Gibraltar
- Coordinates: 36°07′28″N 5°20′56″W
- Completed: 1797
- Owner: Government of Gibraltar

The Mount is the former official residence of the senior officer of the Royal Navy stationed in Gibraltar.

== History ==
=== The Green Family Ownership ===
The Mount was originally built for the then Chief Engineer of Gibraltar, Lt Colonel, later General, William Green, in 1777. Green had been granted a parcel of land in the southern district of Gibraltar, on the condition that he cleared it at his own expense. On this land, he constructed a private residence and extensive gardens, which he named Mount Pleasant. Although Green’s official residence remained at Engineer House on Engineer Lane, Mount Pleasant became the primary home for his family.

The Green Family continued to reside there throughout the Great Siege of Gibraltar (1779–1783) building a bomb-proof shelter was constructed beneath the southern end of the property’s tennis court, which today serves as a water tank. In 1781, when Engineer House was destroyed by bombardment during the siege, the Green family moved permanently to Mount Pleasant.

Green continued to reside at Mount Pleasant until 1783, when he left Gibraltar after 23 years of service and returned to England following his wife's death in 1782.

After Colonel Sir William Green returned to England in 1783, the British Admiralty—then deprived of adequate accommodation in Gibraltar following the Great Siege—began renting Mount Pleasant from Green.

=== Admiralty Ownership ===
In 1797, the Admiralty purchased the property and renamed it The Mount, adapting it as the official residence for senior naval officers. Subsequent extensions were made in 1811, with stables added in 1859 and further expansion in 1905.

One of it first residents was Captain Harry Harmwood who was a Naval Commissioner in Gibraltar from 1793 to 1794. The Mount was purchased in 1799 and for over two hundred years it was the home of the most senior naval officer in Gibraltar. It was part of the military presence here even before the massive extension of the naval facilities at the end of the nineteenth century when £1.5m was spent on work that included three dry docks and the Detached Mole. That work had originally been suggested in 1871 by Captain Augustus Phillimore who was the senior naval officer in Gibraltar and would have lived here.

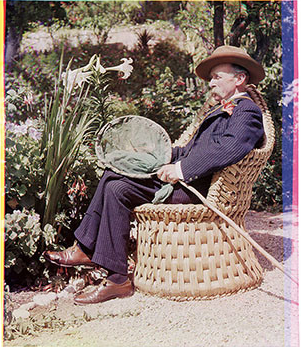
Colonel William Willoughby Cole Verner at The Mount, Sanger-Shepherd process, by Sarah Angelina Acland, 1903.

In 1903 it was home to early use of colour photography. In 1903 Sarah Angelina Acland visited her brother Admiral Sir William Acland in Gibraltar. She was said to be earliest traveller to use colour photography. Acland took photographs of Europa Point looking out from Europe to Africa, pictures of flora in the Admiral's residence, The Mount and a photo of the local ornithologist Colonel William Willoughby Cole Verner. He would have had to keep still for two minutes while three different pictures were taken to capture the red, blue and green components of the image. In 1904 she exhibited in Britain 33 three-colour prints under the title The Home of the Osprey, Gibraltar.

Currently The Mount is owned by the Government of Gibraltar. It is used as a wedding venue.
