= Mike Acland =

English footballer (born 1935)

Personal information
- Full name: Michael Edward Acland
- Date of birth: 4 June 1935 (age 91)
- Place of birth: Sidcup, Bexley, England
- Position: Inside forward

Senior career*
Years	Team	Apps	(Gls)
- Harland Social Club
1956–1957	Gillingham	2	(0)
1957–?	Bromley		
- Sutton United
- Dartford
1959–1960	Cray Wanderers	2	(2)

Managerial career
- 1996–2003: Erith & Belvedere
- * Club domestic league appearances and goals

Michael Edward Acland (born 4 June 1935) is an English professional footballer of the 1950s. Born in Sidcup, he began his professional career with Gillingham but quickly dropped into non-league football. He made two appearances in The Football League. He later managed Erith & Belvedere between 1996 and 2003.
