= Albion Hall =

Coordinates: 51°32′23″N 0°4′25″W

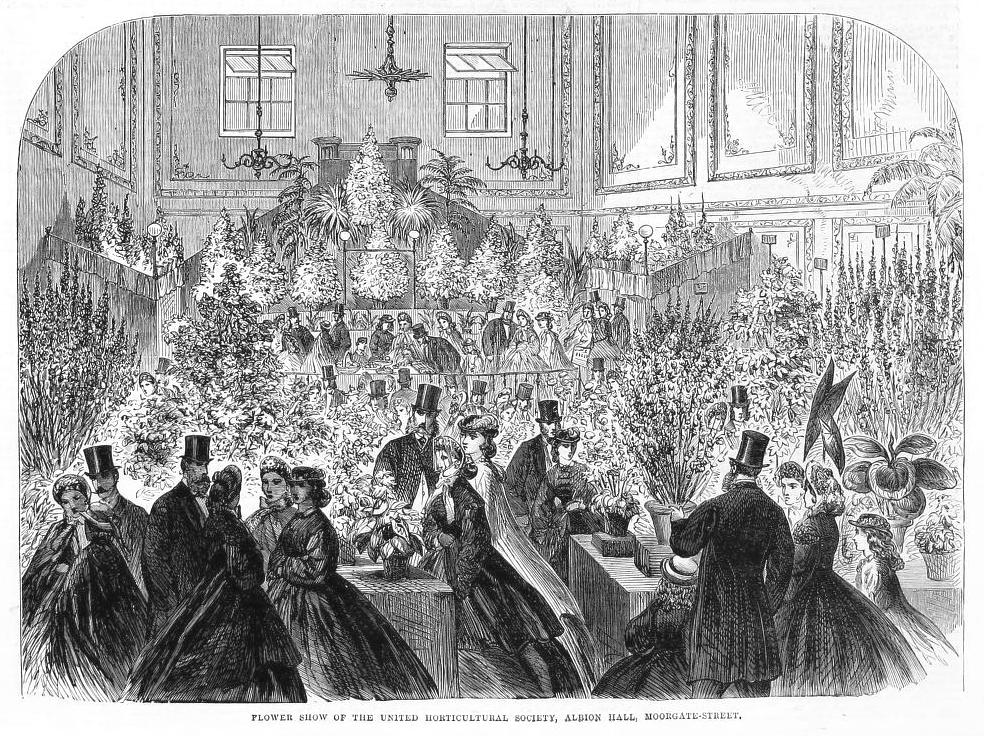
Flower show at Albion Hall, 1865

Albion Hall was a building on the west side of Albion Square, Hackney, built by Islip Odell between 1849 and 1850. It was owned by the Literary and Scientific Institute until 1861. Under the management of the institute, the hall managed lectures, a library, entertainment and classes in chess, French, book-keeping and arts and science. From 1861 it was run as an assembly hall, and after the installation of swimming baths in the 1860s, became public baths. Between 1850 and 1894 the building was licensed, but it closed in 1897. The London School Board re-opened the building in 1899.

The building was demolished in 1944, following bomb damage by a flying bomb during World War II.
