= Simon Acland =

British venture capitalist and author

- Born: Simon Hugh Verdon Acland; 27 March 1958 (age 68)
- Education: Lincoln College, Oxford
- Occupations: Venture capitalist and author
- Spouse: Jo Valentine, Baroness Valentine
- Children: 2
- Father: Sir Antony Acland

Simon Acland (born 27 March 1958) is a British venture capitalist and author.

== Education ==
Simon Hugh Verdon Acland was educated at Eton and Lincoln College, Oxford, graduating in 1979 with an Honours Degree in Modern Languages (French and German).

== Career ==
=== Venture capitalism ===
He spent most of his venture capital career at London-based Quester. He specialised in backing early-stage technology businesses. Two of these, Surfcontrol plc and Orchestream plc, became members of the FTSE 250. Quester was acquired in 2007 by Spark Ventures.

Acland has been a director of some thirty companies, public and private. He was a Trustee and Vice-Chair of the wild flora conservation charity Plantlife. In 2017 he co-founded Green Angel Ventures, now the reference early stage investor for UK climate innovation and currently acts as Chair. He sits on the Board of the Satellite Applications Catapult and of Smart Battery company Powervault.

=== Writing ===
In June 2010 Acland's first novel, The Waste Land, was published by Charlwood Books. A sequel, The Flowers of Evil, followed in July 2011. These are historical novels set in the First Crusade which draw for their material on some of the myths and legends about the Holy Grail, the Assassins, and the Templars. They were republished by Lume Books in 2021.

In October 2010 Nicholas Brealey Publishing published Acland's Angels, Dragons and Vultures : How to tame your investors...and not lose your company, a guide for entrepreneurs to raising finance and managing investors based on his experience of the venture capital world. In 2012 Elliot and Thompson published Elite - The Secret to Exceptional Leadership and Performance, which he wrote jointly with ex-SAS officer Floyd Woodrow.

=== Political career ===
Acland was elected as a member of the London Borough of Lambeth in 1982 for Princes Ward in Kennington. He became Leader of the SDP/Liberal Alliance Group on Lambeth Council in 1984 and was re-elected to the Council for a second four-year term in 1986. In June 1987 he stood unsuccessfully for Parliament in the Vauxhall Constituency.

== Personal life ==
Acland's father was Sir Antony Acland KG, GCMG, GCVO, Head of the Diplomatic Service between 1982 and 1986, and then British Ambassador in Washington till 1991. Simon Acland is married to Jo Valentine, Baroness Valentine, a cross-bench peer, and former Chief Executive of "London First".
