= Gideon Acland =

Merchant, spouse of Maria Lawford, of Tiverton

Gideon Acland (1777–1819) was an English merchant and commodity broker. His surname was commonly spelled Ackland.

== Life ==
The son of Gideon Acland of Tiverton, Devon, he was educated at Blundell's School from 1787 to 1792. His father, a mercer, died in 1799.

Acland joined the Unitarian Society in 1803, address Peckham. That year Gideon Acland & Co., grocers and sugar-factors, were in business at 57 Cannon Street, London. In 1805 Acland was a commodity broker. He fell victim to James Elkin Daniels, later a notorious fraudster, in a forward bargain deal over saltpetre. He ended as a creditor, money he had paid on behalf of Daniels being treated as a forced loan.

In 1812 Acland was one of a group of petitioners against the 1807 Orders in Council, restricting trade with continental Europe, asked to give evidence to a parliamentary committee. The Alumni Cantabrigienses entry for his son Charles indicates that he was at some point a merchant at Antwerp. In his testimony, Acland said that the effect of the 1806 Berlin Decree, in which Napoleon restricted trade with the United Kingdom, was via strict enforcement in Dutch ports to tie up much shipping, including vessels under his direction, during 1807, and also at Bremen.

In 1814 Gideon Acland & Co. was advertising sales of indigo and coffee. Acland's Mincing Lane partnership as sugar brokers with James White was dissolved in 1815. The leading case in bankruptcy law Lucas v Dorrien from 1817 related to West India Dock Company warrants for sugar and molasses in warehouses, made out in favour of Gideon Acland & Co. (or G. Ackland & Co.)

== Family ==
Acland married in 1800 Maria Lawford.

=== Gideon Acland (died 1840) ===
Their eldest son, Gideon Acland II, was admitted to Gray's Inn in 1820. In a Loyal Declaration of that year to George IV, he associated with the Colonial Mart Warehouse, 9 Mincing Lane and Robert Heale. He married in 1825 Elizabeth Allen, daughter of John Allen of Tiverton and Elizabeth Acland, and sister of Peter Allen who was a founder of the Manchester Guardian. Elizabeth Acland was a sister of his father, making this a first-cousin marriage. The brokers Acland & Barrow of Mincing Lane were active in 1822, selling rhubarb and soap; the partnership of Gideon Acland and John Barrow was dissolved in 1826.

Later Gideon Acland II had a legal career in Canada. He was in Perth, Upper Canada; then moved and practiced commercial law in St. Thomas, Upper Canada from 1835 to 1840. He was admitted a barrister in Upper Canada in 1837; and died at London, Upper Canada on 8 July 1840, aged 39.

Acland and his wife ran a school in Perth during their time there, and Acland became part of the story of the 1833 fatal duel between John Wilson and Robert Lyon: Elizabeth Hughes who was the central figure in the events leading to the duel was a teacher in the school, and Wilson wrote to Acland with allegations about her behaviour. Acland adopted for a time David John Hughes (1820–1915), her brother; he was later adopted by Wilson, who married Elizabeth. The school closed, and the Aclands moved from Perth.

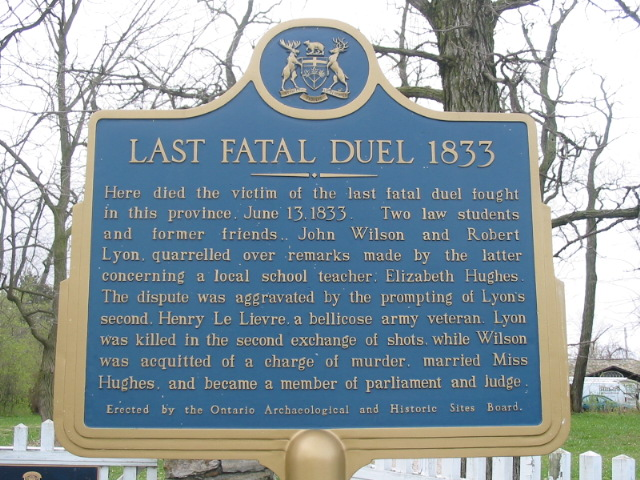
"The Last Fatal Duel", plaque in Perth, Ontario, mentioning the teacher Elizabeth Hughes

Gideon II's only daughter Emily Maria married in 1847 Russell Scott Taylor, eldest son of John Edward Taylor. After his death, she married in 1854 Jules Delbrück of Paris.

=== Other children ===
Other children of Gideon and Maria Acland were:

- Charles Acland (died 1845), cleric.
- Lawford Acland (born 1811), married in 1850 Robina Jemima Maclean, daughter of Major Roderick Maclean of the 3rd Regiment of Foot.
- Maria, eldest daughter, died 1844 aged 41.
- Anna married in 1826 George Henry Ames.
- Frances married in 1840 the Rev. George Armstrong, as his second wife, and was mother of Richard Acland Armstrong.
- Ellen (1808–1884), married in 1841 John Harrison. She was a friend of Emma Darwin.
- Emily, married in 1832 David Rowland of Devonshire Street, Portland Place.
- Lucy, youngest daughter, married in 1859 George Edward Yonge of Eton College.

Maria Acland died at Clifton, Bristol in 1856, aged 74.
