= Mount Acland =

Mountain in New Zealand

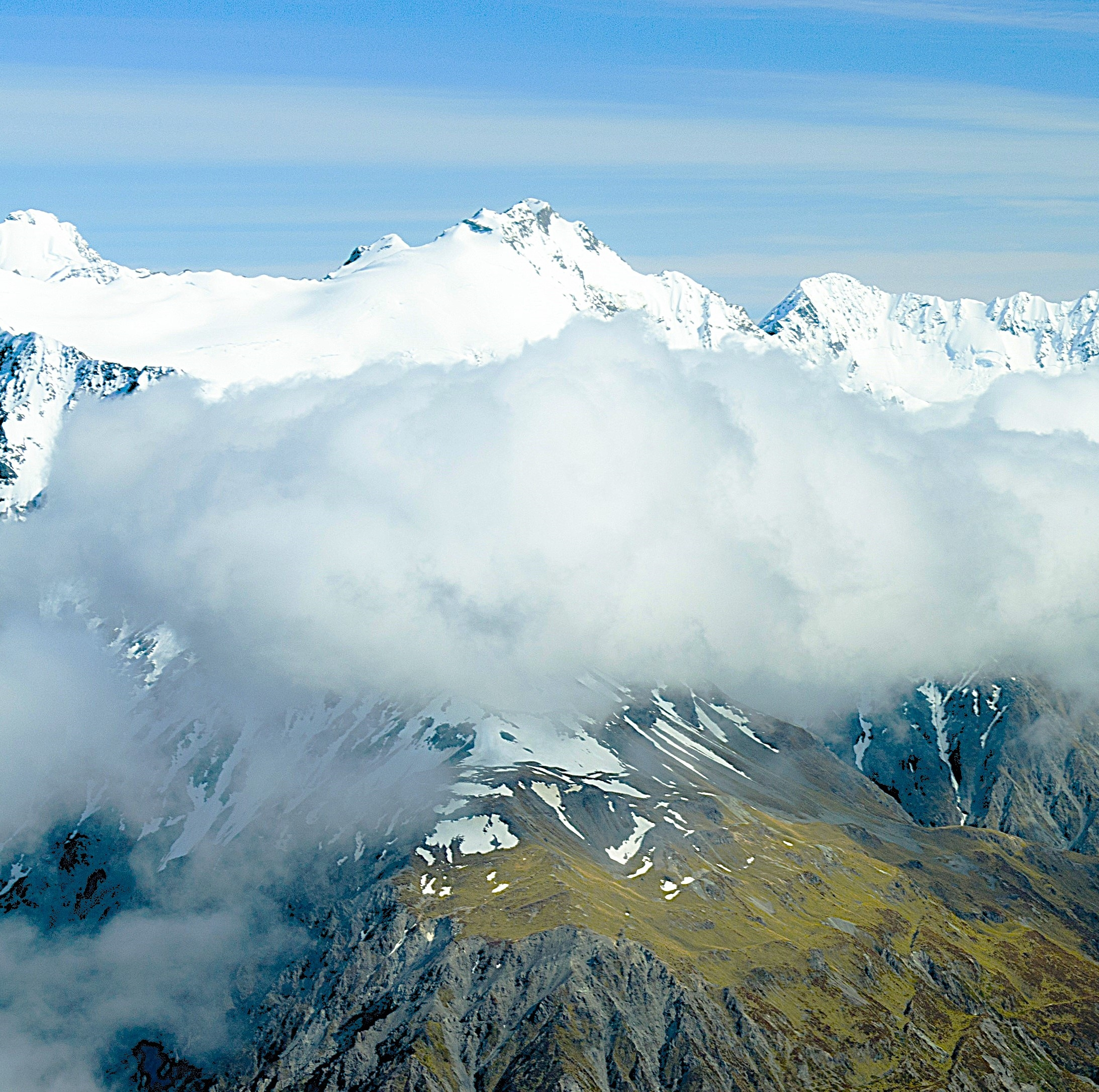
- South aspect

Highest point
- Elevation: 2,562 m (8,406 ft)
- Prominence: 383 m (1,257 ft)
- Isolation: 4.38 km (2.72 mi)
- Listing: New Zealand #53
- Coordinates: 43°31′06″S 170°26′38″E

Geography
- Location within New Zealand
- Interactive map of Mount Acland
- Location: South Island
- Country: New Zealand
- Region: Canterbury
- Protected area: Aoraki / Mount Cook National Park
- Parent range: Southern Alps
- Topo map(s): NZMS260 I35; Topo50 BX16

Climbing
- First ascent: 1914

Mount Acland is a 2,562-metre-elevation (8,406-foot) mountain in the Canterbury Region of New Zealand.

== Description ==
Mount Acland is situated at the northern end of the Liebig Range in the Southern Alps. It is located 190 kilometres (118 mi) west of the city of Christchurch in Aoraki / Mount Cook National Park on the South Island. Precipitation runoff from the mountain drains west to the Murchison River and east to the Godley River. Topographic relief is significant as the summit rises 1,560 metres (5,118 feet) above the Godley Valley in 2.5 kilometres. The nearest higher peak is Mount Mannering, four kilometres to the northwest. The first ascent of the summit was made on 10 March 1914 by Otto Frind and Conrad Kain via the Aida Glacier.

== Climate ==
Based on the Köppen climate classification, Mount Acland is located in a marine west coast (Cfb) climate zone, with a tundra climate at the summit. Prevailing westerly winds blow moist air from the Tasman Sea onto the mountains, where the air is forced upward by the mountains (orographic lift), causing moisture to drop in the form of rain or snow. This climate supports the Aida Glacier on this mountain's west slope. The months of December through February offer the most favourable weather for viewing or climbing this peak.

== Gallery ==
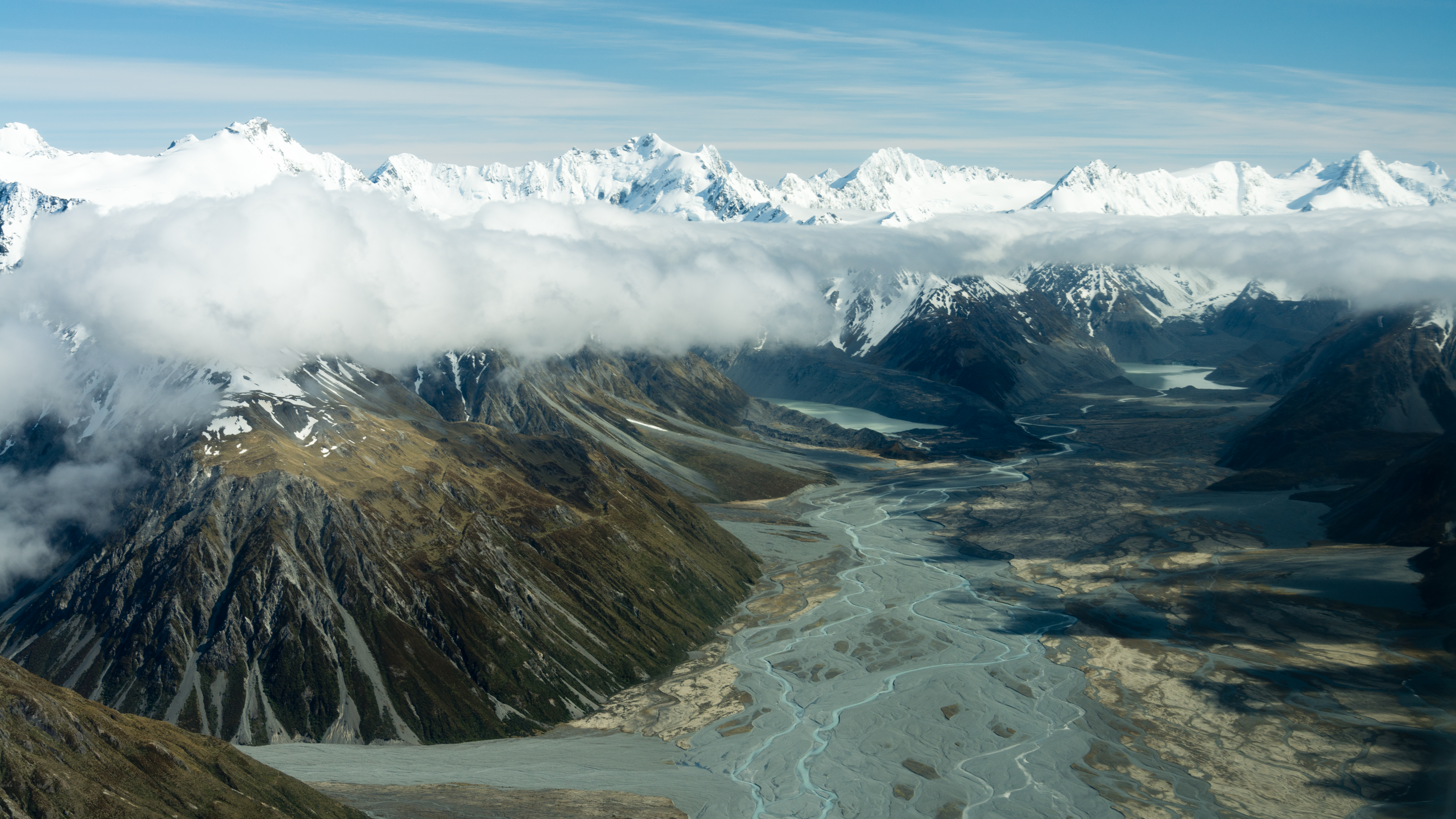
Godley River Valley with Acland in upper left

== See also ==
- List of mountains of New Zealand by height
- John Acland
