= Ackland =

Ackland is an English surname. Notable people with the surname include:

- Cain Ackland (born 1982), Australian rules football player
- Janet Ackland (1938–2019), Welsh bowler
- John Ackland (politician) (1890–1958), Western Australian politician
- John Ackland (rugby league) (born 1958), New Zealand rugby coach
- Joss Ackland (1928–2023), English actor
- Oliver Ackland (born 1979), Australian actor
- Rodney Ackland (1908–1991), English dramatist and playwright
- Ron Ackland (1934–2013), New Zealand rugby league footballer and coach
- Valentine Ackland (1906–1969), British poet
- William Hayes Ackland (1855–1940), American author, lawyer and art collector

== See also ==
- June Ackland, fictional character from the television series The Bill
- Ackland Art Museum, museum at the University of North Carolina at Chapel Hill
- Acland, English surname
