= Charles Duke Yonge =

English historian, classicist, and cricketer (1812-1891)

- Born: 30 November 1812; Eton, Berkshire
- Died: 30 November 1891 (aged 79)
- Burial place: Belfast
- Education: Eton College; University of Cambridge; University of Oxford
- Employer: Queen's College, Belfast
- Spouse: Anne Bethell (m. 1837)
- Relatives: George Edward Yonge (brother)

Charles Duke Yonge (30 November 1812 – 30 November 1891) was an English historian, classicist and cricketer. He wrote numerous works of modern history, and translated several classical works. His younger brother was George Edward Yonge.

== Biography ==
Charles Duke Yonge was born in Eton, Berkshire, on 30 November 1812. He was baptised on 25 December 1812. He was the eldest of eight children to the Reverend Charles Yonge (1781–1830) and Elizabeth Lord (?–1868). His parents married on 4 December 1811. His grandparents were Duke Yonge and Catherine Crawley on his father's side, and Joseph Lord and Corbetta Owen of Pembroke South Wales on his mother's side.

He was educated at Eton College. At age eighteen, he became a foundation scholar at King's College, Cambridge, between 1831 and 1833.

On 17 May 1834, he attended St. Mary's Hall, Oxford, a dependency of and later incorporated into Oriel College. He graduated with a first-class honours B.A. in classics in December 1834. In 1874, he acquired his M.A. from Keble College. He was a professor of history and English literature at Queen's College, Belfast, from 1866. He died 30 November 1891 and was buried in Belfast.

As a cricket player, during the 1836 season for Oxford University, he scored a total of 85 runs in three matches and caught one player out.

== Works ==
- Parallel Lives of Ancient and Modern Heroes, of Epaminondas and Gustavus Adolphus; Philip of Macedon and Frederic the Great (1858)
- The Life of Arthur, Duke of Wellington (1860)
- The History of the British Navy: From the Earliest Period to the Present Time (1863)
- The History of England, from the Earliest Times to the Death of Viscount Palmerston, 1865
- The History of France Under the Bourbons, a.D. 1589–1830, (1866, 4 vols.)
- Life and Administration of Robert Banks, Second Earl of Liverpool (3 vols., 1868)
- The Life of Marie Antoinette, Queen of France (1876)
- Our Great Naval Commanders Drake, Blake, Cook, Rodney, Nelson, Parry (C 1880 second edition 1886 - Swan Sonnenschein, Le Bas & Lowrey "
- The Constitutional History of England from 1760 and 1860 (1882)
- Life of Sir Walter Scott
- England's Great Generals: Sketches of the Lives of Duke of Marlborough, Lord Clive, Duke of Wellington, Sir Charles Napier, Lord Gough
- Flowers of History, Especially Such As Relate to the Affairs of Britain
- Seven Heroines of Christendom
- Three Centuries of Modern History

=== Translations ===
- Cicero, De Inventione (1853)
- Cicero, On the Laws
- Cicero, On the Republic
- Cicero, The Nature of the Gods and on Divination (1853)
- Cicero, The Orations of Marcus Tullius Cicero (1888)
- Cicero, Tusculan Disputations: On the Nature of the Gods, And on the Commonwealth
- Diogenes Laërtius, The Lives and Opinions of Eminent Philosophers (1853) (1, 2, 3)
- Athenaeus of Naucratis, Deipnosophistae (The Dinner-Table Philosophers) (1854)
- Philo of Alexandria, The Works of Philo: Complete and Unabridged (1854–55)

=== Dictionaries ===
- A phraseological English-Latin dictionary, for the use of Eton [and other schools] and King's College, London (1856)
- An English-Greek lexicon

=== Editor ===
- Letters of Horace Walpole, 2 vols.
- Essays Of John Dryden
- Three Centuries of English Literature
- A gradus ad Parnassum: For the use of Eton, Westminster, Harrow, and Charterhouse schools, King's college, London, and Marlborough college (1850) Longmans
