= Guy Acland =

British army officer (born 1946)

Sir Guy Acland, Bt LVO DL
- Born: 24 March 1946 (age 80)
- Military career
- Allegiance: United Kingdom
- Branch: British Army
- Service years: 1966–1994
- Rank: Lieutenant Colonel
- Unit: Royal Artillery
- Awards: Lieutenant of the Royal Victorian Order

Lieutenant Colonel Sir Christopher Guy Dyke Acland, 6th Baronet LVO DL (born 24 March 1946) was a British Army officer and member of the British Royal Household.

== Career ==
Acland was educated at Allhallows School and the Royal Military Academy Sandhurst, from where he commissioned into the Royal Artillery in 1966. Acland served with the 26th Field Regiment, Royal Artillery, in the British Army of the Rhine (BAOR) 1967–1970. He had further regimental duty with the 3rd Regiment Royal Horse Artillery in the United Kingdom and Hong Kong 1970–1973, and the 22nd Air Defence Regiment Royal Artillery in BAOR and the United Kingdom 1974–1977.

He attended the Staff College, Camberley in 1978 (qualifying as a staff officer - psc), and was promoted to major the same year. He then served on the staff of Headquarters Eastern District 1979–1980. From 1981 to 1983 he was Commanding Officer of 'Q' (Sanna's Post) Battery, 5th Regiment Royal Artillery, in the BAOR. Sir Guy, now a baronet, was then a staff officer (SO2) in the Army Staff Duties Directorate of the Ministry of Defence in London (1983–1985).

He returned to regimental duties as second in command of the 1st Regiment Royal Horse Artillery in the BAOR 1986–1988. Sir Guy then took his first post in the Royal Household, as equerry to Prince Philip, Duke of Edinburgh 1988–1990. He was promoted to lieutenant-colonel in 1990, and was a staff officer (SO1) in the Management Services Organisation 1990–1992. His last army posting before rejoining the Royal Household was as commanding officer, Southampton Officer Training Corps 1992–1994.

Sir Guy was Equerry to The Queen and Deputy Master of the Household 1994–1999. On his retirement he was appointed to be an Extra Equerry to The Queen.

After his retirement he was part-time Administrator, for the HSA Charitable Trust from 2001.

Sir Guy succeeded to his baronetcy (as the 6th of the creation of 1890) in 1983. He was made an MVO in 1990, promoted to LVO in 1999, and is a Deputy Lieutenant of the Isle of Wight.

== Marriage and children ==
He married Christine Mary Carden Waring, daughter of Dr. John Waring, in 1971. They had two sons:

- Alexander John Dyke Acland (born 29 May 1973)
- Hugh Antony Waring Dyke Acland (born 23 April 1976)

Baronetage of the United Kingdom
Preceded by Antony Acland	Baronet (of St. Mary Magdalen, Oxford); 1984–present	Incumbent
