= Royal Devon Yeomanry =

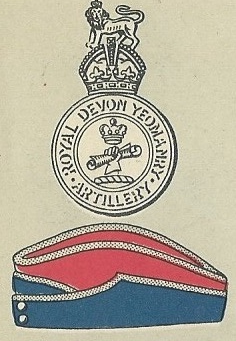
- Badge of the Royal Devon Yeomanry Artillery
- Active: 7 June 1920–present day
- Country: United Kingdom
- Branch: British Army
- Type: Yeomanry
- Role: Challenger 2 replacement
- Size: Squadron
- Part of: Royal Armoured Corps
- March: Widdecombe Fair
- Anniversaries: Monte Cassino
- Engagements: Second World War

Commanders
- Honorary Colonel: Major Charles S. Fowle, TD

Insignia
- Identification symbol: Maple Leaf
- Abbreviation: RDY

The Royal Devon Yeomanry was a Yeomanry regiment of the British Army, formed in 1920. It participated in the Second World War and now forms a squadron of the Royal Wessex Yeomanry.

== History ==
=== Formation ===
Following the experience of the First World War, it was decided that only the fourteen most senior yeomanry regiments would be retained as horsed cavalry, with the rest being transferred to other roles. As a result, on 7 June 1920, the Royal 1st Devon Yeomanry was amalgamated with the Royal North Devon Yeomanry to form the Royal Devon Yeomanry and simultaneously transferred to the Royal Artillery to form 11th (Devon) Army Brigade, RFA.

=== Pre war ===
The brigade / regiment underwent a number of redesignations before the outbreak of Second World War. In 1921 it was renumbered and regained its yeomanry title as 96th (Devon Yeomanry) Army Brigade, RFA and in 1922 became 96th (Devonshire Yeomanry) Army Brigade, RFA. In 1923 it regained its royal title as 96th (Royal Devon Yeomanry) Brigade, RFA. Another title change came in 1924 as the Royal Field Artillery was reamalgamated back into the Royal Artillery and the regiment became 96th (Royal Devon Yeomanry) Field Brigade, RA. The final change came in 1938 as artillery brigades became regiments, hence 96th (Royal Devon Yeomanry) Field Regiment, RA. In 1939, the Territorial Army was duplicated – existing units formed a second unit. 96th (Royal Devon Yeomanry) Field Regiment, RA formed 142nd (Royal Devon Yeomanry) Field Regiment, RA.

=== Second World War ===
Field regiments were organised in 1938 into two 12-gun batteries. The experience of the BEF in 1940 showed the problem with this organisation: field regiments were intended to support an infantry brigade of three battalions. This could not be managed without severe disruption to the regiment. As a result, field regiments were reorganised into three 8-gun batteries.

==== 96th (Royal Devon Yeomanry) Field Regiment, RA ====
96th Field Regiment served in the Home Forces for most of the war, moving to India in January 1945.

At the outbreak of the war, 96th Field Regiment was part of 45th Division. Initially commanding two batteries – 381 from Torverton and 382 from Totnes – the third battery (469) was formed in the regiment at Knottingley in December 1940.

It transferred to 61st Division in June 1944 before being posted to India. In the Far East, it supported 81st (West Africa) Division and 25th Indian Division in preparation for Operation Zipper.

==== 142nd (Royal Devon Yeomanry) Field Regiment, RA ====
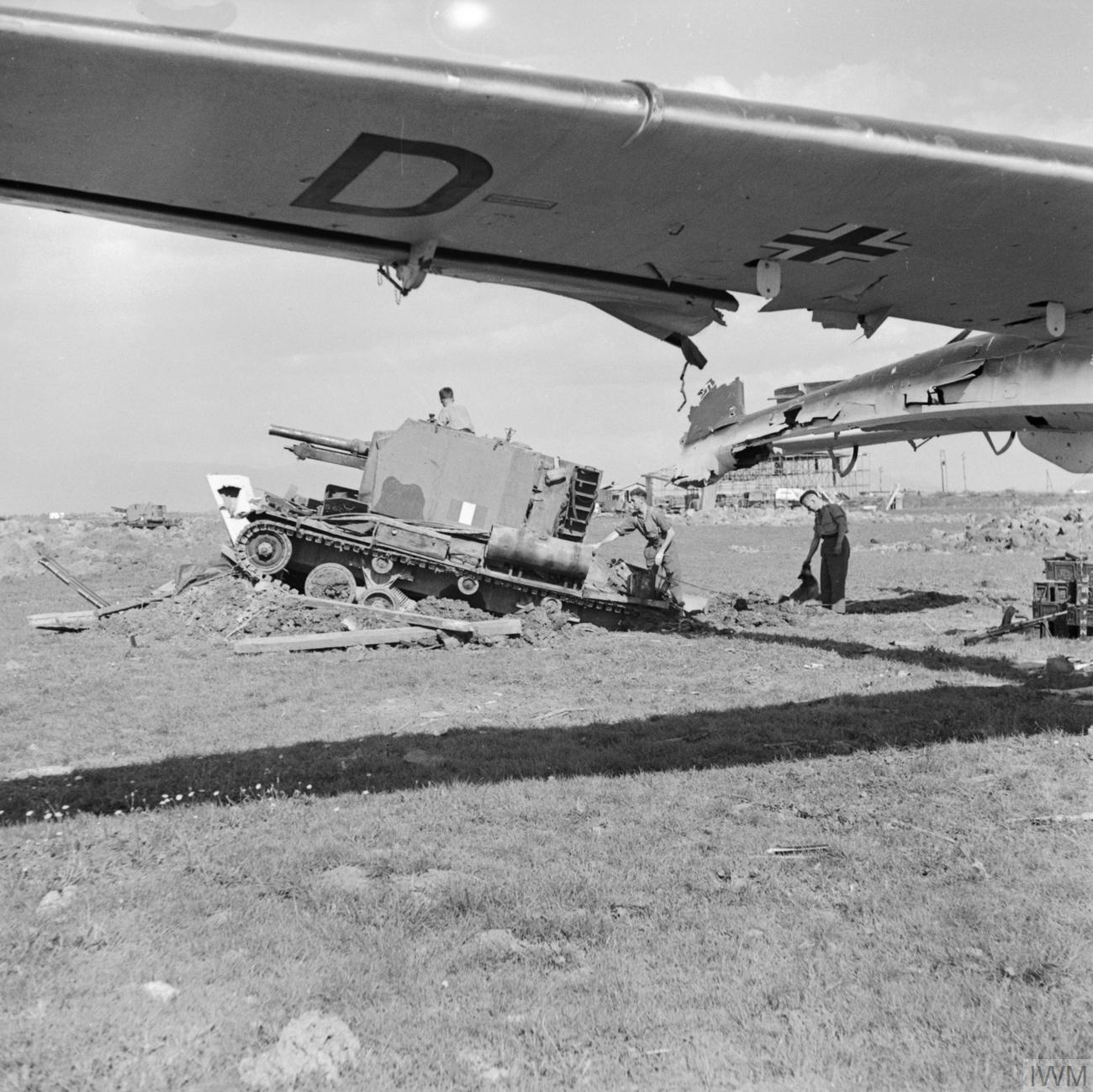
A battery of 142nd Field Regiment Bishops at a former German airfield in Sicily, October 1943

142nd Field Regiment also initially served in the Home Forces, before moving to Sicily and Italy from July 1943.

At the outbreak of the war, 142nd Field Regiment was also part of 45th Division. Initially commanding two batteries – 383 from Torrington and 384 from South Molton – the third battery (506) was formed in the regiment at Bircotes on 5 November 1940. It was authorised to use the "Royal Devon Yeomanry" designation from 17 February 1942.

142nd Field Regiment fought in Sicily from July 1943 and in Italy thereafter under command of 8th Army, taking part in most of the major actions of that campaign including the landings in Sicily and Anzio and the Battle of Monte Cassino. The regiment was armed with Bishop self-propelled guns during the Sicilian campaign and part of the Italian campaign but in early 1944 was re equipped with the American M7 Priest self-propelled gun. For its support to the Canadian Division it was awarded the right to wear the Maple Leaf of Canada.

=== Post war ===
Both regiments were reformed in 1947 as 296th (Royal Devon Yeomanry) Field Regiment, RA (at Exeter in 43rd (Wessex) Division) and 342nd (Royal Devon Yeomanry) Medium Regiment, RA (at Taunton in 91st Army Group Royal Artillery. In 1950, 342nd Medium Regiment was amalgamated into 296th Field Regiment and in 1956 the regiment also absorbed 256th (Wessex) Light Anti-Aircraft Regiment, RA. 296th Field Regiment survived until 1967.

On 1 April 1967 the regiment was amalgamated with the 4th Battalion, The Devonshire Regiment to form The Devonshire Territorials (Royal Devon Yeomanry/The 1st Rifle Volunteers). In the process it was reduced to squadron strength as "A" Squadron. This had a brief, two year, existence and throughout that time was kept very short of equipment and training time. It was reduced to cadre in 1969.

With a change of government policy, in 1971 the Territorials were again reformed, and on 1 April a new regiment was born incorporating three old and distinguished cavalry regiments. "A" and "C" Squadrons were formed from the Royal Gloucestershire Hussars, "B" Squadron from the Royal Wiltshire Yeomanry, and "D" Squadron from the old Royal Devon Yeomanry. The regiment is called the Royal Wessex Yeomanry.

The Royal Devon Yeomanry now serves as D (Royal Devon Yeomanry) Squadron, Royal Wessex Yeomanry, based at Wyvern Barracks in Exeter, Devon. It provides trained replacement crewmen for the Regular Army's Challenger 2 Main battle tank.

== Regimental museum ==
The Royal Devon Yeomanry Museum is incorporated in the Museum of Barnstaple and North Devon in The Square, Barnstaple.

== Battle honours ==
The Royal Devon Yeomanry inherited the combined battle honours of the Royal 1st Devon Yeomanry and of the Royal North Devon Yeomanry (honours in bold are emblazoned on the regimental colours):

Second Boer War	**South Africa 1900–01**
First World War	**Somme 1918**, **Bapaume 1918**, **Hindenburg Line**, **Épéhy**, **France and Flanders 1918**, **Gallipoli 1915**, **Egypt 1916–17**, **Gaza**, **Jerusalem**, **Tell 'Asur**, **Palestine 1917–18**
Second World War	The Royal Artillery was present in nearly all battles and would have earned most of the honours awarded to cavalry and infantry regiments. In 1833, William IV awarded the motto Ubique (meaning "everywhere") in place of all battle honours.

== Honorary Colonels ==
- 1967–1968: Peter Acland
- 1968–1984: Lewis Hugh Clifford, 13th Baron Clifford of Chudleigh
- 1984–1992: Sir John Acland

== See also ==
- Yeomanry
- List of British Army Yeomanry Regiments converted to Royal Artillery

== Bibliography ==
- Bellis, Malcolm A. (1995). Regiments of the British Army 1939-1945 (Artillery). London: Military Press International. ISBN 0-85420-110-6.
- Gen Sir Martin Farndale, History of the Royal Regiment of Artillery: The Years of Defeat: Europe and North Africa, 1939–1941, Woolwich: Royal Artillery Institution, 1988/London: Brasseys, 1996, ISBN 1-85753-080-2.
- Forty, George (1998). British Army Handbook 1939-1945. Stroud, Gloucestershire: Sutton Publishing Limited. ISBN 0-7509-1403-3.
- Frederick, J.B.M. (1984). Lineage Book of British Land Forces 1660-1978. Wakefield, Yorkshire: Microform Academic Publishers. ISBN 1-85117-009-X.
- Norman E.H. Litchfield, The Territorial Artillery 1908–1988 (Their Lineage, Uniforms and Badges), Nottingham: Sherwood Press, 1992, ISBN 0-9508205-2-0.
- Mileham, Partick (1994). The Yeomanry Regiments; 200 Years of Tradition. Edinburgh: Canongate Academic. ISBN 1-898410-36-4.
- Titles and Designations of Formations and Units of the Territorial Army, London: War Office, 7 November 1927 (RA sections also summarised in Litchfield, Appendix IV).
