= Antony Guy Acland =

British baronet

Major Sir Antony Guy Acland Bt
- Born: 17 August 1916
- Died: 14 December 1983
- Education: Winchester College
- Occupation(s): Soldier and Eldest son of Hubert Acland

Major Sir Antony Guy Acland, 5th Baronet (17 August 1916 – 14 December 1983), was the eldest son of Sir Hubert Acland, 4th Baronet and Lalage Mary Kathleen Acland.

== Succession ==
He succeeded his father as 5th Baronet Acland, of St. Mary Magdalen, Oxford on the latter's death on 6 May 1978. On his death in 1983 he was succeeded in the baronetcy by his son.

== Education ==
He attended Winchester College.

== Career ==
He fought in the Second World War, eventually rising to the rank of Major in the Royal Artillery.

== Family ==
He married firstly, Avriel Ann Wingfield-Stratford, daughter of Captain Mervyn Edward John Wingfield-Stratford and Doris Amie Sheldon, on 13 September 1939, and had issue:

- Gail Alison Jane Acland (b. 1942)

His first wife died in 1943.

He married secondly, Margaret Joan Rooke (d.2010), daughter of Major Nelson Rooke and Marjorie Renton, on 15 July 1944, and had issue:

- Christopher Guy Dyke Acland, 6th Baronet (b. 1946)
- Caroline Barbara Margaret Acland (b. 1947)

Baronetage of the United Kingdom
| Preceded by Hubert Acland | Baronet (of St. Mary Magdalen, Oxford); 1976–1983 | Succeeded by Guy Acland |
