= Sarah Angelina Acland =

English photographer (1849–1930)

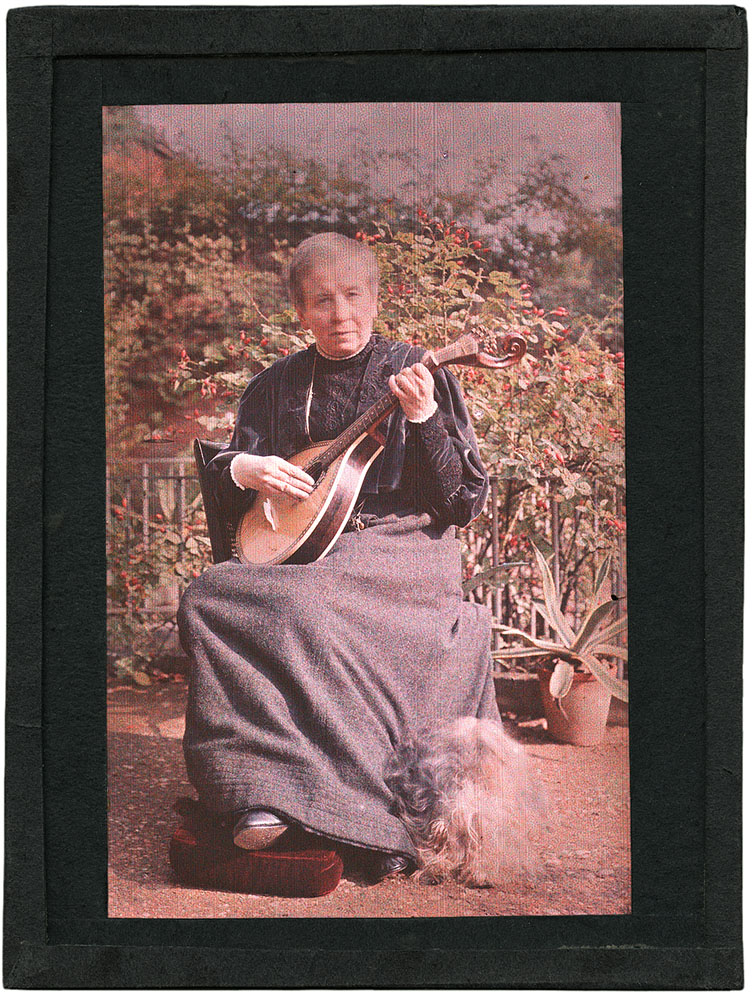
- Early 20th-century colour self-portrait photograph of Sarah Angelina Acland.
- Born: 26 June 1849; Broad Street, Oxford, England
- Died: 2 December 1930 (aged 81); Park Town, Oxford, England
- Occupation: Photographer
- Known for: Early colour photography
- Parents: Sir Henry Acland (father); Sarah Acland (née Cotton) (mother)

Sarah Angelina "Angie" Acland (26 June 1849 – 2 December 1930) was an English amateur photographer, known for her portraiture and as a pioneer of colour photography. She was credited by her contemporaries with inaugurating colour photography "as a process for the travelling amateur", by virtue of the photographs she took during two visits to Gibraltar in 1903 and 1904.

== Life ==
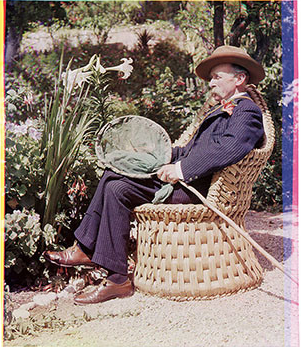
Col. Willoughby Verner, 1903 photograph by Acland

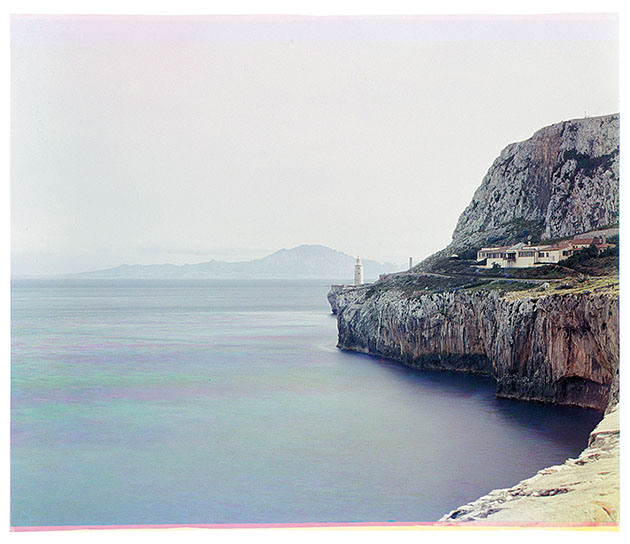
View of the Europa Point Lighthouse in Gibraltar with the African mountain Jebel Musa across the Strait, 1903

Sarah Acland was the daughter of Sir Henry Wentworth Acland (1815–1900), Regius Professor of Medicine at Oxford University, and Sarah Acland (née Cotton, 1815–1878), after whom the Acland Hospital in Oxford was named. She lived with her parents at 40–41 Broad Street, central Oxford.

As a child, Sarah Acland was photographed by Charles Lutwidge Dodgson (aka Lewis Carroll) with her friend Ina Liddell, the sister of Alice Liddell. At the age of 5, on 20 June 1855, she and one of her brothers presented a trowel to Edward Smith-Stanley, 14th Earl of Derby, Chancellor of Oxford University, at the laying of the foundation stone for the Oxford University Museum. The art critic John Ruskin taught her art and she also knew a number of the Pre-Raphaelites. She even assisted Dante Gabriel Rossetti when he was painting murals at the Oxford Union.

At the age of 19, Acland met and was influenced by photographer Julia Margaret Cameron. Acland took portraits and landscapes. For example, she took a portrait photograph of the Prime Minister William Gladstone during a visit by him to Oxford. On the death of her mother in 1878, Sarah became her father's housekeeper at the family home in Broad Street until his death in 1900. In 1885, she instigated a cabmen's shelter in the middle of Broad Street, which stood there until 1912.

Acland started to experiment with colour photography in 1899. Her earliest work was accomplished using the Ives Kromskop and Sanger Shepherd colour processes, in which three separate photographs were taken through red, green, and blue filters. In 1903 Acland visited her brother Admiral Acland at his home in Gibraltar. Acland took photographs of Europa Point looking out from Europe to Africa, pictures of flora in the Admiral's residence, The Mount, and the author and ornithologist Colonel William Willoughby Cole Verner. In 1904, she exhibited at the Annual Exhibition of the Royal Photographic Society of Great Britain with 33 three-colour prints under the title The Home of the Osprey, Gibraltar.

Acland later used the Autochrome process of the Lumiere brothers, introduced in 1907. In her later life after the death of her father, until her death in 1930, Sarah Acland lived in Park Town, North Oxford, taking many colour photographs there. She also visited and widely photographed on the Atlantic island of Madeira, staying at Reid's Hotel to the west of central Funchal.

Sarah Acland was elected a member of the Royal Photographic Society in December 1900 and remained so until her death. She became Fellow of the Royal Photographic Society (FRPS) in 1905 and the Royal Society of Arts (FRSA).

She never married, and in 1901, the year after her father's death, she moved to Clevedon House, now 10 Park Town, Oxford, where she died in 1930. A blue plaque was dedicated to her on this house on 24 July 2016.

== Legacy ==
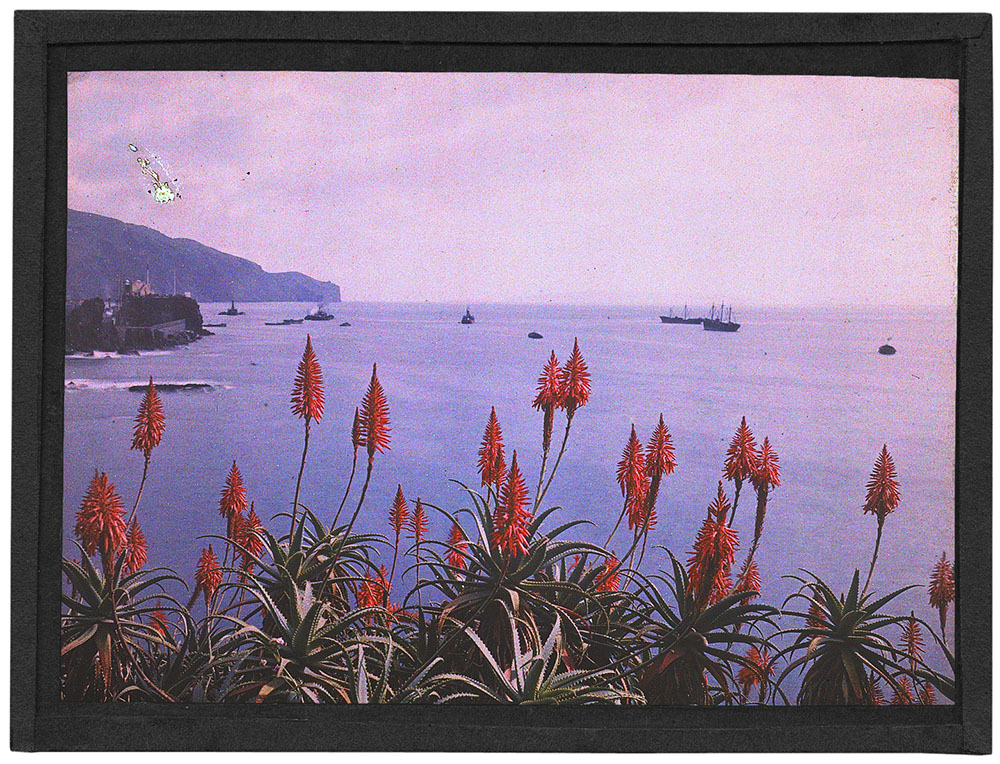
Funchal Bay, Madeira, by Sarah Angelina Acland, c.1910

A collection of Acland's photographs is housed at the History of Science Museum, Oxford. The Bodleian Library in Oxford has catalogues of her photograph albums and papers, (together with those of her father Henry Acland), dating from the late 19th century. Acland's photographs are also in the collection of the National Portrait Gallery, London.

Colour photographs and artwork by Sarah Acland featured in an exhibition on Colour Revolution in Victorian times at the Ashmolean Museum in Oxford during 2023–4, including the first colour photograph of the portrait of the art critic John Ruskin by the Pre-Raphaelite painter John Everett Millais.

== See also ==
- E. J. Bowen, chemist, who later lived in the same house as Sarah Acland in Park Town, Oxford
- List of women photographers
