= Henry Acland =

English physician and educator

Sir Henry Wentworth Dyke Acland KCB FRS
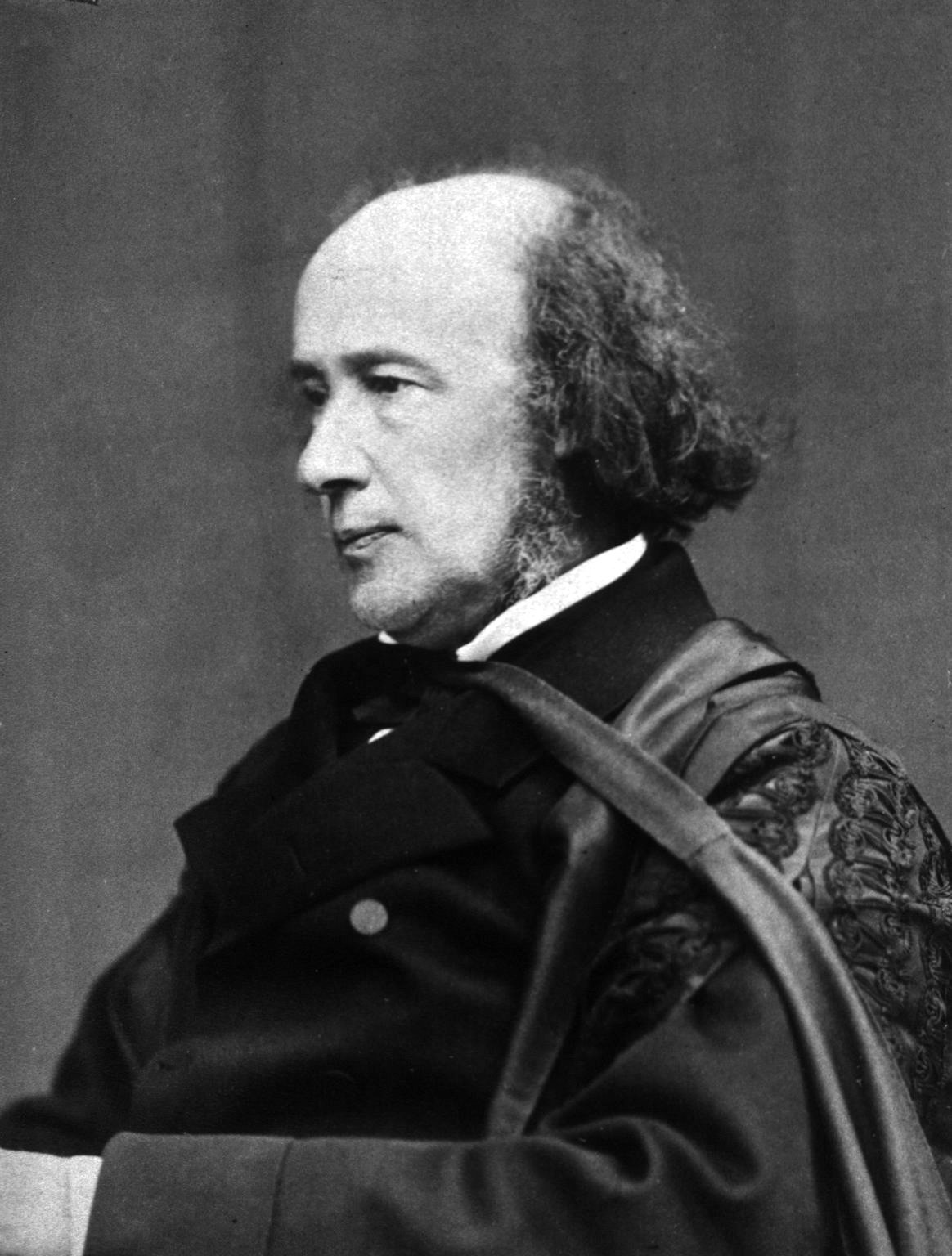
- Portrait photograph of Henry Acland
- Born: 23 August 1815; Killerton, Exeter, England
- Died: 16 October 1900 (aged 85); 40 Broad Street, Oxford, England
- Occupation: Physician
- Known for: Regius Professor of Medicine (Oxford)
- Board member of: Royal Commission on sanitary laws in England and Wales; General Medical Council
- Spouse: Sarah Acland (m. 1846; died 1878)
- Children: Admiral Sir William Alison Dyke Acland, 2nd Baronet (1847–1924); Sarah Angelina Acland (1849–1930); Henry Dyke Acland (1850–1936); Theodore Dyke Acland (1851–1931), father of Theodore Acland (1890–1960); Herbert Dyke Acland (1855–1877); Sir Reginald Brodie Dyke Acland (1856–1924); Francis Edward Dyke Acland (1857–1943); Alfred Dyke Acland (1858–1937)
- Parents: Sir Thomas Dyke Acland, 10th Baronet (father); Lydia Elizabeth Hoare (mother)

Academic background
- Education: Harrow School; Christ Church, Oxford

Academic work
- Era: Victorian
- Discipline: Medicine
- Institutions: Christ Church, Oxford

Sir Henry Wentworth Dyke Acland, 1st Baronet, KCB FRS (23 August 1815 – 16 October 1900) was an English physician and educator.

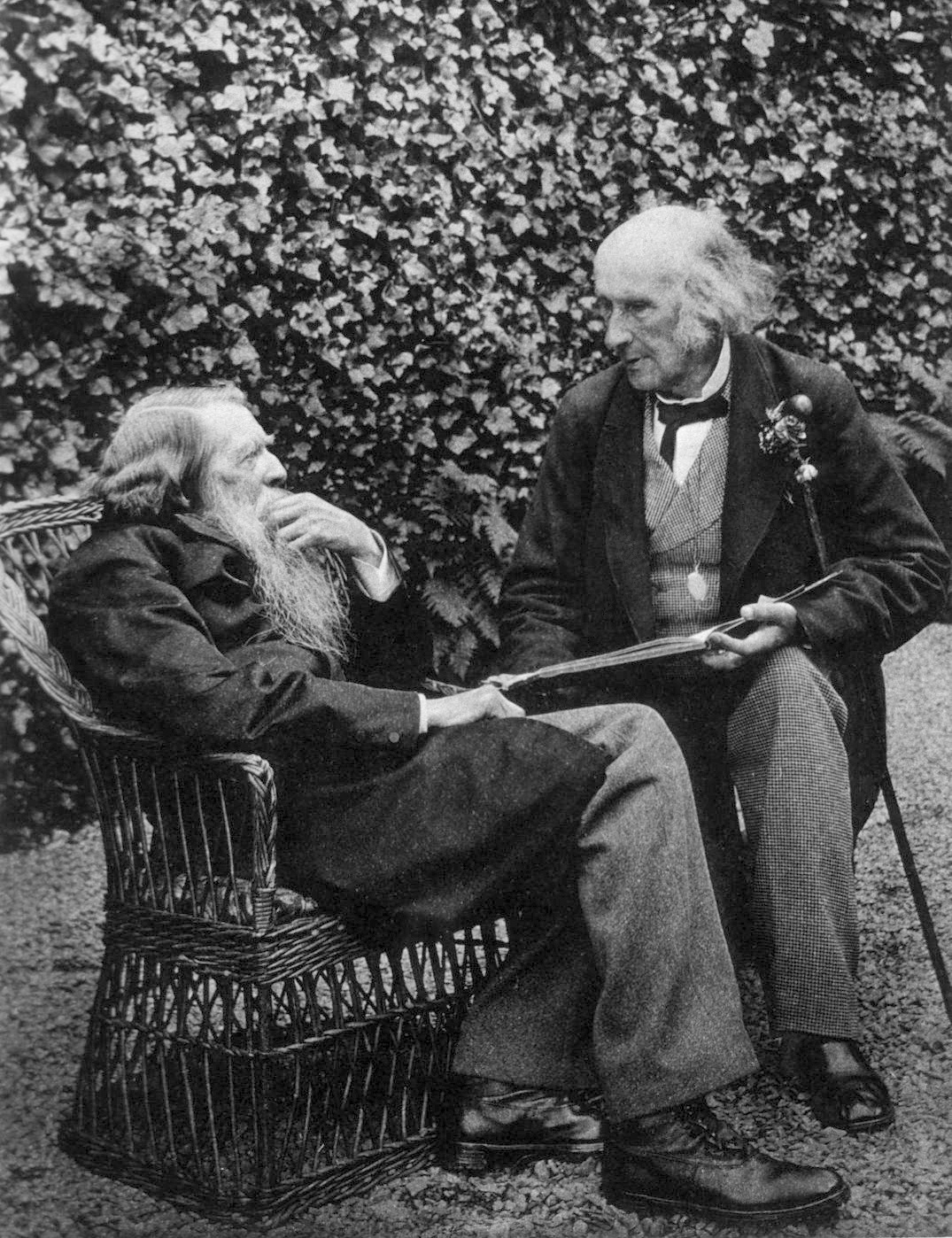
Henry Acland (right) with John Ruskin in 1893, taken by Acland's daughter, Sarah Angelina Acland

== Life ==
Henry Acland was born in Killerton, Exeter, the fourth son of Sir Thomas Acland and Lydia Elizabeth Hoare, and educated at Harrow and Christ Church, Oxford. He was elected Fellow of All Souls College, Oxford in 1840, and then studied medicine in London and Edinburgh. Returning to Oxford, he was appointed Lee's reader in anatomy at Christ Church in 1845, was made a Fellow of the Royal Society in 1847, and in 1851 was appointed Radcliffe librarian and physician to the Radcliffe Infirmary.

Seven years later, he became Regius Professor of Medicine, a post that he retained until 1894. He was also a curator of the university galleries and the Bodleian Library. From 1858 to 1887, he represented his university on the General Medical Council, of which he served as president from 1874 to 1887.

In 1860, he accompanied the then Prince of Wales as his physician on his Canada and the United States tour.

Acland was appointed a Companion of the Order of the Bath (CB) in 1883, and was promoted to a Knight Commander (KCB) in 1884. He was created a baronet in 1890, and ten years later, he died at his house in Broad Street, Oxford (number 40 on the site of the new Bodleian Library building).

Acland took a leading part in the revival of the Oxford medical school and introduced the study of natural science into the university. As Lee's reader, he began to form a collection of anatomical and physiological preparations on the plan of John Hunter, and the establishment of the Oxford University Museum, opened in 1861, as a centre for the encouragement of the study of science, especially concerning medicine, was due primarily to his efforts. "To Henry Acland," said his lifelong friend, John Ruskin, "physiology was an entrusted gospel of which he was the solitary preacher to the heathen," but on the other hand, his thorough classical training preserved science at Oxford from too abrupt a severance from the humanities. In conjunction with Dean Liddell, he revolutionised the study of art and archaeology, to cultivate these subjects, for which, as Ruskin declared, no one at Oxford cared before that time, began to flourish in the university.

Acland was also interested in questions of public health. He served on the Royal Commission on sanitary laws in England and Wales in 1869. He published a study of the cholera outbreak at Oxford in 1854, together with various pamphlets on sanitary matters. His memoir on the topography of the Troad, with a panoramic plan (1839), was among the fruits of a cruise he made in the Mediterranean for his health.

Acland was elected as a member to the American Philosophical Society in 1873.

His son, Colonel Alfred Dyke Acland, married Hon. Beatrice Danvers Smith, daughter of Rt. Hon. W. H. Smith of the Newsagents dynasty on 30 July 1885 and gained the rank of Lieutenant-Colonel in 1910 in the service of the Royal 1st Devon Yeomanry (Territorial Army). Another son, Theodore Dyke Acland married the daughter of Sir William Gull, a leading London medical practitioner and one of the Physicians-in-Ordinary to HM Queen Victoria.

== Marriage and children ==
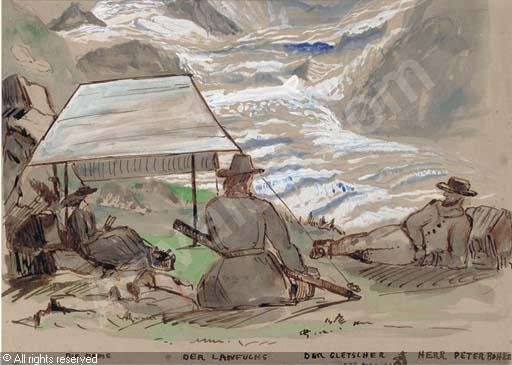
Henry Acland. "Travellers by a Swiss glacier".

He married Sarah Cotton, daughter of William Cotton and Sarah Lane, on 14 July 1846. They had seven sons and a daughter:

- Admiral Sir William Alison Dyke Acland, 2nd Baronet (1847–1924)
- Sarah Angelina Acland (1849–1930)
- Henry Dyke Acland (1850–1936)
- Theodore Dyke Acland (1851–1931), the father of Theodore Acland (1890–1960)
- Herbert Dyke Acland (1855–1877)
- Sir Reginald Brodie Dyke Acland (1856–1924)
- Francis Edward Dyke Acland (1857–1943)
  - One of Francis' children was Clemence Margaret Acland (1889–1973) a nature photographer, ornithologist and researcher.
- Alfred Dyke Acland (1858–1937)

The old Acland Hospital, initially in Wellington Square, Oxford and later on the Banbury Road in Oxford (now part of Keble College), was founded in memory of Acland's wife, Sarah.

Their daughter, Sarah Acland, subsequently lived in Park Town and was an early pioneer of colour photography. Some of her photographs are in the collection of the Museum of the History of Science in Broad Street, opposite the family home.

Baronetage of the United Kingdom
| New creation | Baronet (of St Mary Magdalen); 1890–1900 | Succeeded by William Dyke Acland |
