= Sarah Acland =

English socialite and philanthropist (1815–1878)

- Born: Sarah Cotton; 21 July 1815
- Died: 25 October 1878 (aged 63)
- Resting place: Holywell Cemetery
- Spouse: Henry Acland (m. 1846)
- Children: 8, including William, Sarah, Theodore, Reginald, and Alfred
- Father: William Cotton

Sarah, Lady Acland (née Cotton; 21 July 1815 – 25 October 1878) was an English socialite and philanthropist. After her death, the Sarah Acland Home was established in her memory. She was the wife of Sir Henry Acland, Regius Professor of Medicine at the University of Oxford.

== Life ==
Sarah Cotton was born in Leytonstone, Essex, England, the eldest daughter of William Cotton FRS (1786–1866), Governor of the Bank of England, and Sarah Lane (1790–1872). She lived with her family in Marylebone, London before she was married.

On 14 July 1846, Sarah Cotton married Sir Henry Acland; they had seven sons and a daughter:

- Admiral Sir William Alison Dyke Acland, 2nd Baronet (1847–1924)
- Sarah Angelina Acland (1849–1930), photographer
- Henry Dyke Acland (1850–1936)
- Theodore Dyke Acland (1851–1931), the father of Theodore Acland (1890–1960)
- Herbert Dyke Acland (1855–1877)
- Sir Reginald Brodie Dyke Acland (1856–1924)
- Francis Edward Dyke Acland (1857–1943)
  - One of Francis' children was Clemence Margaret Acland (1889–1973) a nature photographer, ornithologist and researcher
- Alfred Dyke Acland (1858–1937)

The Aclands lived at 41 Broad Street, Oxford. They were at the centre of the social life of Oxford University.

Sarah Acland died in Oxford on 25 October 1878.

== Legacy ==
The Sarah Acland Memorial and Home for Nurses was originally established in 1882 at 37 Wellington Square, Oxford in Sarah Acland's memory. This moved to 25 Banbury Road, Oxford, in 1897 as the Sarah Acland Home and later became known as the Acland Hospital. The hospital was rebuilt in 1936 by Lord Nuffield. In 2004, the hospital moved to Headington, a suburb of east Oxford, as The Manor Hospital, managed by Nuffield Hospitals. The Banbury Road building became part of Keble College, Oxford.

Sarah Acland's only daughter and namesake, Sarah Angelina Acland was an early pioneer of colour photography. Some of her photographs are in the collection of the Museum of the History of Science in Broad Street, opposite the location of the family home.
