= Peter Acland =

British soldier (1902-1993)

Brigadier Acland in 1953

Brigadier Peter Bevil Edward Acland OBE MC TD JP DL (9 July 1902 – 9 January 1993) was a British Army officer.

== Background ==
He was the younger son of Alfred Dyke Acland and his wife Beatrice Danvers (née Smith), who was the daughter of William Henry Smith and his wife Emily Danvers Smith, 1st Viscountess Hambleden. Acland was educated at Eton College and Christ Church, Oxford. In 1932, he was invested an Officer of the Most Venerable Order of the Hospital of St John of Jerusalem.

== Career ==
Acland joined the Sudan Political Service in 1924 and was decorated with the Order of the Nile in 1936. During the Second World War, he served in the Sudan Defence Force, was wounded and honoured with a Military Cross in 1941. He was stationed in Abyssinia and fought in the Western Desert. Acland was then transferred to the Aegean Islands, where he was wounded and mentioned in despatches, receiving the Greek War Cross.

After the war, he was chief administrator first of the Dodecanese, then of the Cyrenaica until 1946, for which he was appointed an Officer of the Order of the British Empire in the King's Birthday Honours. Three years later, he received the Territorial Decoration. Acland was promoted to lieutenant-colonel in 1947, commanding the 296 Field Regiment, Royal Devon Yeomanry the next four years until 1951, when he was granted the rank of honorary brigadier. He became colonel in 1954 and retired from active service in 1961.

In 1952, Acland was appointed honorary colonel of a Territorial Army Unit and subsequently in 1967 of The Devonshire Territorials until the following year. He was nominated High Sheriff of Devon in 1961, representing the county also as Justice of the Peace. Having been already Deputy Lieutenant from 1948, Acland served as Vice Lord Lieutenant of Devon from 1962 until 1978.

== Family ==
On 7 July 1927, he married Bridget Susan Barnett, daughter of Reverend Herbert Barnett, and had two sons. The older John was a major-general in the British Army, while the younger Antony was a diplomat.

Military offices
| New regiment | Honorary Colonel of The Devonshire Territorials; 1967 – 1968 | Succeeded by The Lord Clifford of Cudleigh |
