= Hubert Acland =

British naval captain (1890–1978)

Captain Sir Hubert Guy Dyke Acland Bt DSO
- Born: 8 June 1890; St George Hanover Square, London, England
- Died: 6 May 1978 (aged 87); Isle of Wight, England
- Relatives: Sir William Acland, 2nd Baronet (father); Sir William Acland, 3rd Baronet (brother)
- Military career
- Allegiance: United Kingdom
- Branch: Royal Navy
- Service years: 1905-1945
- Rank: Captain
- Commands: HMS Castor; HMS Halcyon; HMS Harebell; HMS Centurion; HMAS Australia; HMAS Albatross; HMS Vindictive
- Conflicts: World War I World War II
- Awards: Companion of the Distinguished Service Order

Captain Sir Hubert Guy Dyke Acland, 4th Baronet Acland, DSO (8 June 1890 – 6 May 1978) was an officer in the British Royal Navy who served during both World Wars.

== Biography ==
=== Naval career ===
Acland was born in London, the younger son of Admiral Sir William Acland, 2nd Bt, (1847–1924), and the Hon. Emily Anna Smith (1859–1942). After attending Bradfield College, Acland joined the Royal Navy on 15 January 1905, at the age of 14. After training, he was assigned to the armoured cruiser Good Hope, part of the Channel Fleet, with the rank of midshipman in 1908. He attained promotion to sub-lieutenant on 15 November 1909, and lieutenant on 15 November 1910.

He served throughout the Great War, receiving a Mention in Dispatches. On 15 November 1918, within a few days of the armistice with Germany, Acland was promoted to lieutenant commander. On 8 March 1920, he was appointed a Companion of the Distinguished Service Order to recognise his "distinguished services as Gunnery Officer of the 1st Destroyer Flotilla, while operating in the Baltic in 1919".

From late 1920 until early 1922, Acland was Stationed at Port Edgar on the Firth of Forth. In July 1922, he returned to sea to serve as Gunnery Officer aboard the light cruiser Centaur. Starting in July 1924, he was aboard the cadet training battleship Thunderer from July 1924, receiving a promotion to commander on 31 December 1924.

Acland spent two years from March 1925 in the Naval Intelligence Division at the Admiralty, before serving aboard the heavy cruiser Kent from December 1927 as Fleet Gunnery Officer of the China Station. After returning to England in 1930, he briefly commanded the reserve cruiser, Castor at Devonport, before being assigned to the battleship Revenge in the Mediterranean Fleet in December.

Promoted to captain on 30 June 1932, he attended the Royal Navy War College at Greenwich and the Senior Officers' School at Sheerness from March 1933, before being appointed to command of Halcyon as Senior Officer of the 1st Minesweeping Flotilla on 12 March 1934. From 1 August 1935 he was in command of Harebell and the Fishery Protection and Minesweeping Flotilla. He returned to duty at the Admiralty in April 1936 and briefly commanded the target vessel Centurion in October of that year.

In February 1937, Acland was lent to the Royal Australian Navy. He served as commanding officer of the heavy cruiser HMAS Australia from April 1937 to April 1938, then the seaplane carrier HMAS Albatross as she was sailed back to the UK, arriving at Devonport in December 1938.

In August 1939, just before the outbreak of the Second World War, he was appointed Senior Officer of the Reserve Fleet at Devonport. From November 1939 was Commanding Officer of the Gunnery School at Chatham. From 15 March 1941, he commanded the fleet repair ship Vindictive and, from 8 July 1941, served as Naval Aide-de-camp to the King.

Acland was officially placed on the Retired List on 6 February 1942 but remained in service on the staff of the Commander-in-Chief at Rosyth in 1943, and from November of that year until the end of the war served under the Flag Officer-in-Charge, Northern Ireland, based in Belfast. He finally retired from the Navy after the end of the war in 1945.

=== Personal life ===
On 21 August 1915, Acland married his second cousin (they were both great-grandchildren of Sir Thomas Dyke Acland, 10th Baronet) Lalage Mary Kathleen Acland (1889–1961), at All Saints Church, Dorchester. They had two sons; Major Sir Antony Guy Acland, 5th Bt. (1916–1983) and Lieutenant Colonel James Alison Acland (1919–1993).

Acland succeeded to the title of 4th Baronet Acland on 4 December 1970 after the death of his older brother Colonel Sir William Acland, 3rd Baronet. He died at his home on the Isle of Wight on 6 May 1978.

Baronetage of the United Kingdom
Preceded by William Acland	Baronet Acland (of St. Mary Magdalen, Oxford); 1970–1976	Succeeded by Antony Acland
