= Alfred Dyke Acland =

British Army officer (1858–1937)

Alfred Dyke Acland CBE JP
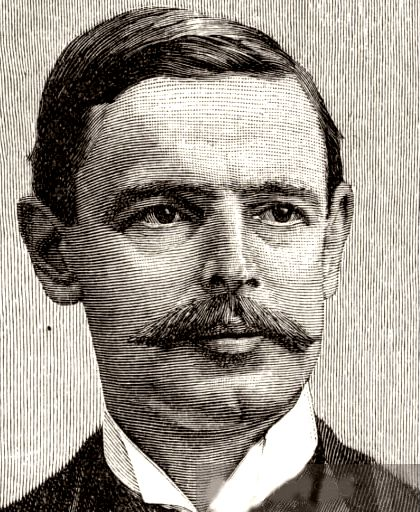
- Acland, in 1892
- Born: 19 August 1858; Oxford, England
- Died: 22 March 1937 (aged 78); Honiton, Devon, England
- Relatives: Henry Acland (father); Peter Acland (son)
- Military career
- Allegiance: United Kingdom
- Branch: British Army
- Rank: Lieutenant Colonel
- Commands: Royal Devon Yeomanry
- Conflicts: World War I
- Awards: Croix de Guerre

Colonel Alfred Dyke Acland CBE JP (19 August 1858 – 22 March 1937) was a British Army officer.

== Private life ==
The seventh son of Sir Henry Wentworth Acland, by his marriage to Sarah Cotton, Acland was educated at Temple Grove School and Charterhouse School.

On 30 July 1885, Acland married Beatrice Danvers Smith, daughter of W. H. Smith of the bookselling dynasty. They had at least five children:

- Angela Cicely Mary Acland (1888–1953).
- Katharine Acland (1892–1966).
- Sarah Beatrice Acland (1896–1979) married Cecil Stafford-King-Harman.
- Lieutenant-Colonel Arthur William Acland (1897–1992).
- Peter Bevil Edward Acland (1902–1993).

Acland's memorial services took place on 25 March 1937 at St Clement Danes, London, and at Exeter Cathedral, attended by many people, including a bishop and clergy, aristocracy, military officers, and various institutions. His funeral was held in the Church of St Andrew, Feniton, attended by the family only.

== Career ==
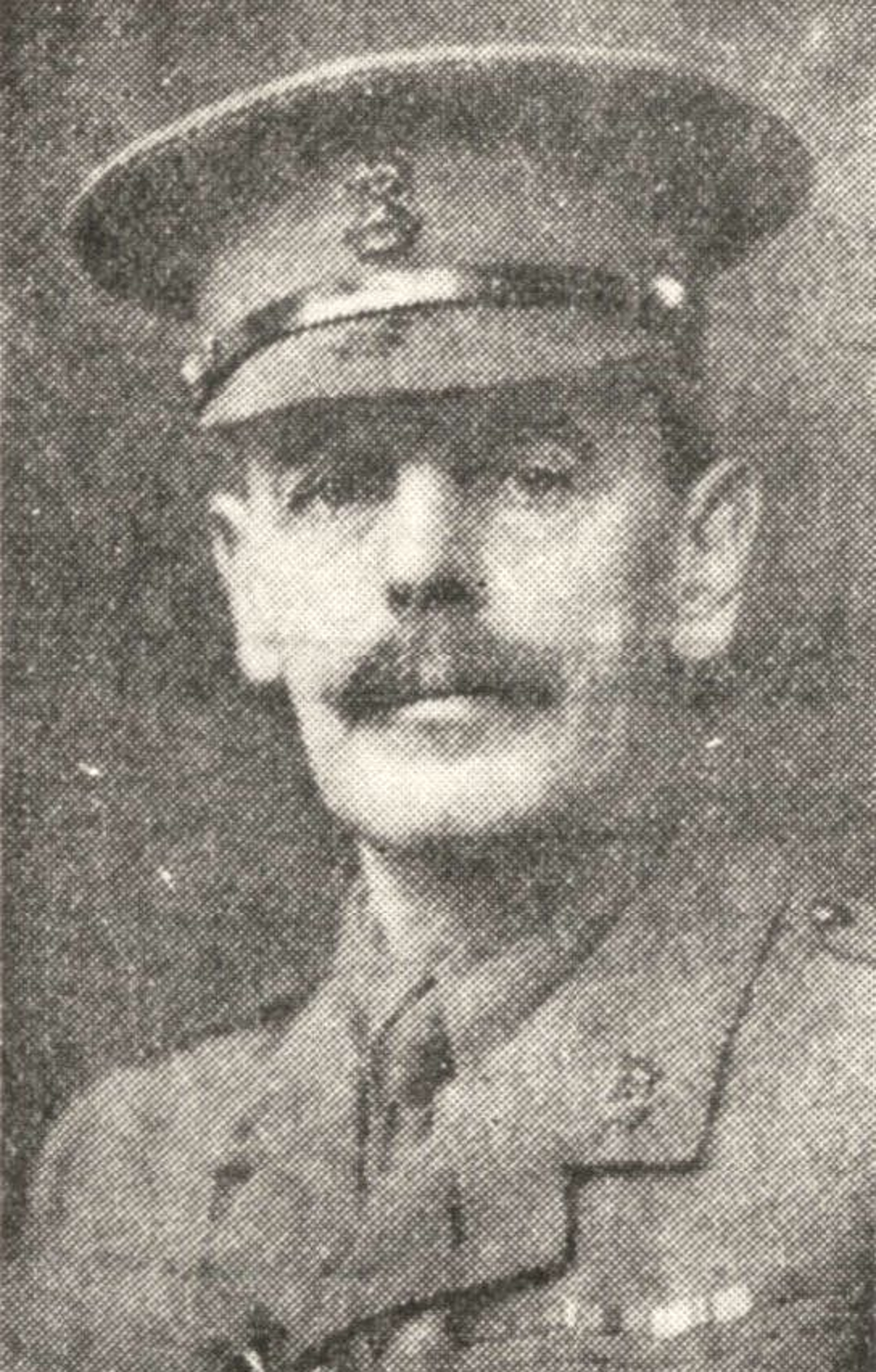
Acland, in uniform

Acland commanded the Royal 1st Devon Yeomanry between 1910 and 1914. He was promoted major on 10 February 1902. He reached the rank of lieutenant colonel in 1910 when he took up command of the 1st Royal Devon Yeomanry. In 1915, during the First World War, he was appointed to command the Base Depot Remounts and was decorated with the Croix de Guerre. In 1917, Acland became assistant director of labour and, in 1918, was appointed the labour commandant of the Australian Corps.

== Honours and institutions ==
Acland was invested as a Knight of Justice of the Most Venerable Order of the Hospital of Saint John of Jerusalem in 1916, and as a Commander of the Order of the British Empire (CBE) in 1920. He was further a Justice of Peace for Devon. He was elected a Fellow of the Royal Botanic Society in November 1902.
