= Sir William Acland, 3rd Baronet =

British Army officer & peer (1888–1970)

Sir William Henry Dyke Acland, 3rd Baronet MC, AFC, TD, JP, DL (18 May 1888 – 4 December 1970) was the eldest son of Sir William Acland, 2nd Baronet and Hon. Emily Anna Smith.

== Succession ==
He succeeded his father as 3rd Baronet Acland, of St. Mary Magdalen, Oxford on the latter's death on 26 November 1924. On his death in 1970 he was succeeded in the baronetcy by his younger brother.

== Education ==
He attended Eton College and Christ Church, Oxford.

== Career ==
He fought in the Great War, where he was wounded, and Mentioned in Dispatches. He served with the Royal Artillery and the Royal Flying Corps. He was awarded with the Military Cross, the Air Force Cross and the Territorial Decoration. At various times he acted as Deputy Lieutenant, Justice of the Peace, High Sheriff (1851) and County Alderman for Hertfordshire.

== Family ==
He married Margaret Emily Barclay (d.1967), daughter of Charles Theodore Barclay, on 26 April 1916, and had issue:

- Elizabeth Margaret Acland (1919–1998), married Major Edward Cecil O'Brien (1943)
- Juliet Mary Acland (1922–1991), married Peter Robert Tabor (1939)
- Sarah Josephine Acland (1930–1961), married George Edward Brown (1954)
- Rosalyn Emily Patricia Acland (21 November 1931 – 2006), married Kenneth John Coles (1953)

== Sources ==
- 'ACLAND, Sir William Henry Dyke', Who Was Who, A & C Black, 1920–2007; online edn, Oxford University Press, Dec 2007

Honorary titles
Preceded by David Bowes-Lyon	High Sheriff of Hertfordshire; 1951	Succeeded by Charles Maynard
Baronetage of the United Kingdom
Preceded by William Acland	Baronet (of St. Mary Magdalen, Oxford); 1924–1970	Succeeded by Hubert Acland
