= Sir William Acland, 2nd Baronet =

Royal Navy Admiral (1847-1924)

Admiral Sir William Acland Bt CVO JP DL
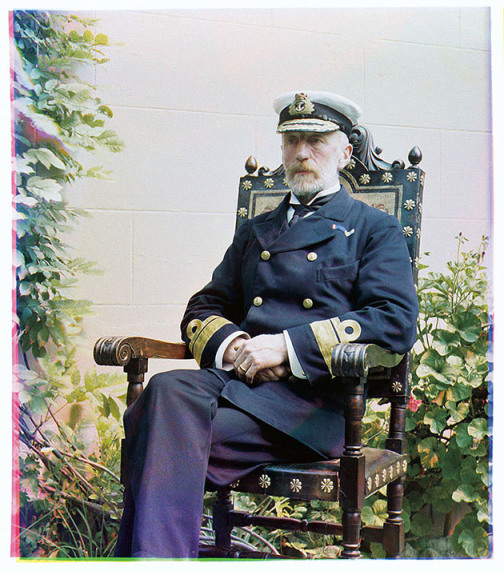
- An early colour photo taken in 1903 by his sister Sarah
- Born: 18 December 1847
- Died: 26 November 1924 (aged 76)
- Spouse: Emily Anna Smith (m. 1887)
- Relatives: Henry Acland (father); Sarah Cotton (mother)
- Military career
- Rank: Admiral
- Commands: Channel Squadron; Admiral Superintendent of the Gibraltar Dockyard
- Awards: CVO

Admiral Sir William Alison Dyke Acland, 2nd Baronet, CVO, JP, DL (18 December 1847 – 26 November 1924) was a Royal Navy officer who rose to the rank of Admiral. He served in the Mediterranean Fleet, North American Station, Australia Station and the Channel Squadron.

== Early life ==
William Acland was the eldest son of Sir Henry Acland, 1st Baronet and Sarah Cotton.

== Career ==
In 1879, Acland was promoted to the rank of Commander. In May 1883 he received command of the sloop HMS Miranda on the Australian Station.

In January 1885 he was promoted to the rank of Captain. Miranda was engaged in anti-blackbirding operations in the south-west Pacific. She visited many of the Ellice Islands in 1886.

In July 1889, Acland was appointed to command the corvette HMS Volage (1869) in the Training Squadron, following which he commanded the cruiser HMS Edgar (1890) in the Mediterranean Fleet, then he was appointed to command of the cruiser HMS Australia (1886) of the Channel Squadron.

Acland was appointed second in command of the Channel Squadron from early June 1901, and hoisted his flag on board the pre-dreadnought battleship HMS Magnificent on 5 June 1901. After a year he was relieved of the command in the Channel Squadron, and struck his flag on the Magnificent on 5 June 1902.

Four months later, he was appointed Admiral Superintendent of the Gibraltar Dockyard, and was received in audience by King Edward VII on 21 October 1902, before taking up the position later the same month when he hoisted his flag at the receiving ship HMS Cormorant on 30 October. He lived at the official residence The Mount at Gibraltar, whilst he held the office of Admiral Superintendent from 1902 to 1904. He was promoted to vice-admiral on 15 March 1904, and left Gibraltar three months later. He was promoted to Admiral in 1908. He was placed on the Retired List on 17 July 1911.

He was a deputy lieutenant of Devon, and a justice of the peace for Oxfordshire and Devon.

== Personal life ==
William Acland married Hon. Emily Anna Smith, daughter of the Rt. Hon. William Henry Smith and Emily Danvers, Viscountess Hambleden, on 7 July 1887, and had the following children:

- Sir William Acland, 3rd Baronet (1888–1970)
- Sir Hubert Acland, 4th Baronet (1890–1978)

== Succession ==
Acland succeeded his father as 2nd Baronet Acland, of St Mary Magdalen, Oxford on the latter's death on 16 October 1900. On his death in 1924, he was succeeded in the baronetcy by his eldest son.

Military offices
Preceded by	Admiral-Superintendent of HM Dockyard, Gibraltar; 1902–04	Succeeded by
Baronetage of the United Kingdom
Preceded by Henry Acland	Baronet (of St Mary Magdalen, Oxford); 1900–1924	Succeeded by William Acland
