= Gas Museum (disambiguation) =

The Gas Museum (also known as the National Gas Museum) is a museum in Leicester, England.

Gas Museum may also refer to:

- Dunedin Gasworks Museum, a preserved gasworks and museum in Dunedin, in the South Island of New Zealand
- Gas Museum (Budapest), a Hungarian industrial history museum that operated between 1994 and 2012
- London Gas Museum, a museum in Bromley-by-Bow, London, England
- Warsaw Gasworks Museum, a museum in Warsaw, Poland

== See also ==
- Gas (disambiguation)
- Museum (disambiguation)
