= Museum (disambiguation) =

A museum is an institution dedicated to displaying and preserving culturally or scientifically significant objects.

Museum may also refer to:

== Arts, entertainment, and media ==
=== Films ===
- Museum (2016 film) directed by Keishi Ōtomo and based on the manga by Ryosuke Tomoe
- Museum (2018 film), Mexican film

=== Music ===
- The Museum (band), an American contemporary Christian band
- Museum (Ball Park Music album), 2012
- Museum (Mike Tramp album), 2014
- The Museum (album), by Nana Mizuki, 2007
- "Museum" (song), a 1967 song by Donovan, covered by Herman's Hermit

=== Other uses in arts, entertainment, and media ===
- Museum (periodical), an imprint of Tokyo National Museum
- The Museum (TV series), a 2007 British documentary series

== Places ==
- Museum railway station, a train station in Sydney, Australia
- Museum (TTC), a subway station in Toronto, Canada
- Museum Lane, London
- Museum Mile, New York City
- Museum Road, Oxford
- Museum Street, London
- Museum, a planning area of Singapore

== Other uses ==
- .museum the internet top-level domain
- Society of Christian Doctrine or Magister Utinam Sequater Evangelium Universus Mundus (M.U.S.E.U.M.)

== See also ==
- Muzeum (Prague Metro), a railway station in Prague, Czech Republic
- List of museums
