= Lamb and Flag =

Lamb and Flag or Lamb & Flag may refer to:

- The insignia of the Middle Temple
- Lamb & Flag, Oxford, a pub in Oxford, England
- Lamb and Flag, Covent Garden, a pub in London, England

== See also ==
- Pub names in Great Britain
- Lamb of God
