= The Eagle and Child =

Pub in Oxford, England

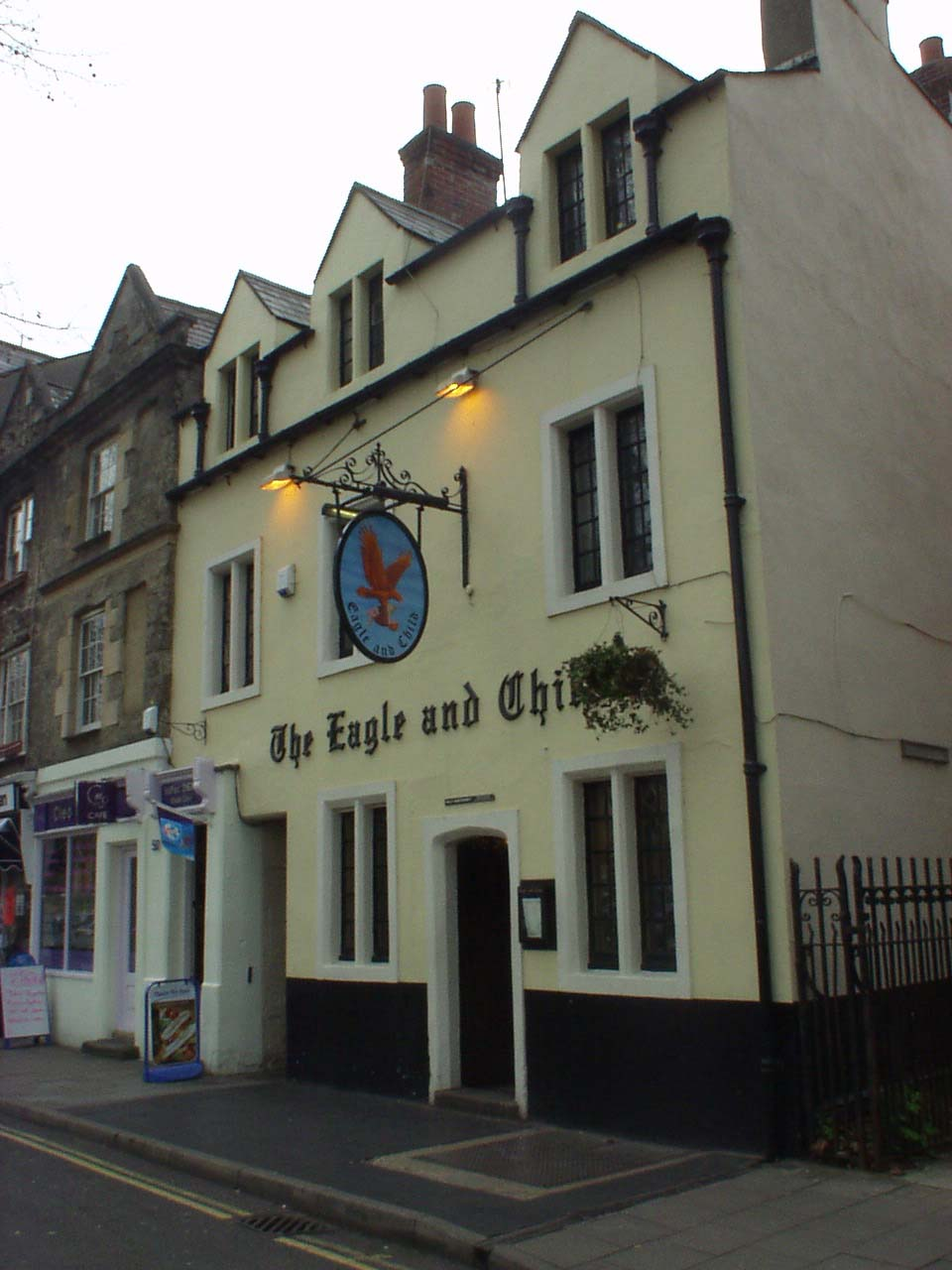
- The Eagle and Child

- Location within Oxford city centre

General information
- Coordinates: 51°45′26″N 1°15′37″W

The Eagle and Child, nicknamed "the Bird and Baby", is a pub in St Giles', Oxford, England, owned by the Ellison Institute of Technology and previously operated by Mitchells & Butlers as a Nicholson's pub. The pub had been part of an endowment belonging to University College since the 17th century. It has associations with the Inklings writers' group, which included J. R. R. Tolkien and C. S. Lewis. In 2005, 25 other pubs in the United Kingdom had the same name.

== History ==
The first record of the pub's name is from 1684, and is variously said to derive from the legend of Ganymede being abducted by the eagle of Zeus, or from the crest of the Earl of Derby, with a story of a noble-born baby found in an eagle's nest. The child was called Oskatel and was found by Sir Thomas Lathom, who became father-in-law to Sir John Stanley. The pub's long-standing nickname is the Bird and Baby.

The pub had been part of an endowment belonging to University College since the 17th century. The college placed it on the market for £1.2 million in December 2003, saying that it needed to rebalance its property portfolio. It was bought by the nearby St John's College, which also owns the Lamb and Flag pub opposite. The Eagle and Child is a Grade II listed building.

The pub has remained closed since March 2020 in the early part of the COVID-19 pandemic. Planning permission has been granted to sympathetically refurbish it, with the upper floors being converted to hotel accommodation, along with the upper floors of two adjacent properties, the ground floor of the adjacent property serving as the hotel reception and the addition of a restaurant to the rear of the property. The planned changes will not affect the appearance of front of the pub, including the Rabbit Room. The business is currently owned by the Ellison Institute of Technology, who plan to reopen it as a pub, with the upper floors converted to meeting rooms.

== Meeting-place of the Inklings ==
The Inklings were an Oxford writers' group which included C. S. Lewis, J. R. R. Tolkien, Charles Williams, Owen Barfield, and Hugo Dyson. From late 1933, they met on Thursday evenings at Lewis's college rooms at Magdalen, where they would read and discuss various material, including their unfinished manuscripts. These meetings were accompanied with more informal lunchtime gatherings at various Oxford pubs, and coalesced into a regular meeting held on Monday or Tuesday lunchtimes at The Eagle and Child, in a private lounge at the back of the pub called the "Rabbit Room".

The formal Thursday meetings ended in October 1949 when interest in the readings petered out, but the meetings at the Eagle and Child continued, and it was at one of those meetings in June 1950 that C.S. Lewis distributed the proofs for The Lion, the Witch and the Wardrobe.

The membership of the Inklings changed over the years. Tolkien, for example, drifted away from the meetings in the late 1950s, whereas Lewis, who had lived around Oxford since 1921, was a central figure until his death in 1963. When The Eagle and Child was modernised in 1962, with the pub being extended to the rear, the Rabbit Room's former privacy was inevitably destroyed; the group reluctantly changed its allegiance to the Lamb & Flag on the other side of St Giles'. The meetings in the Lamb & Flag were soon abandoned after Lewis's death.

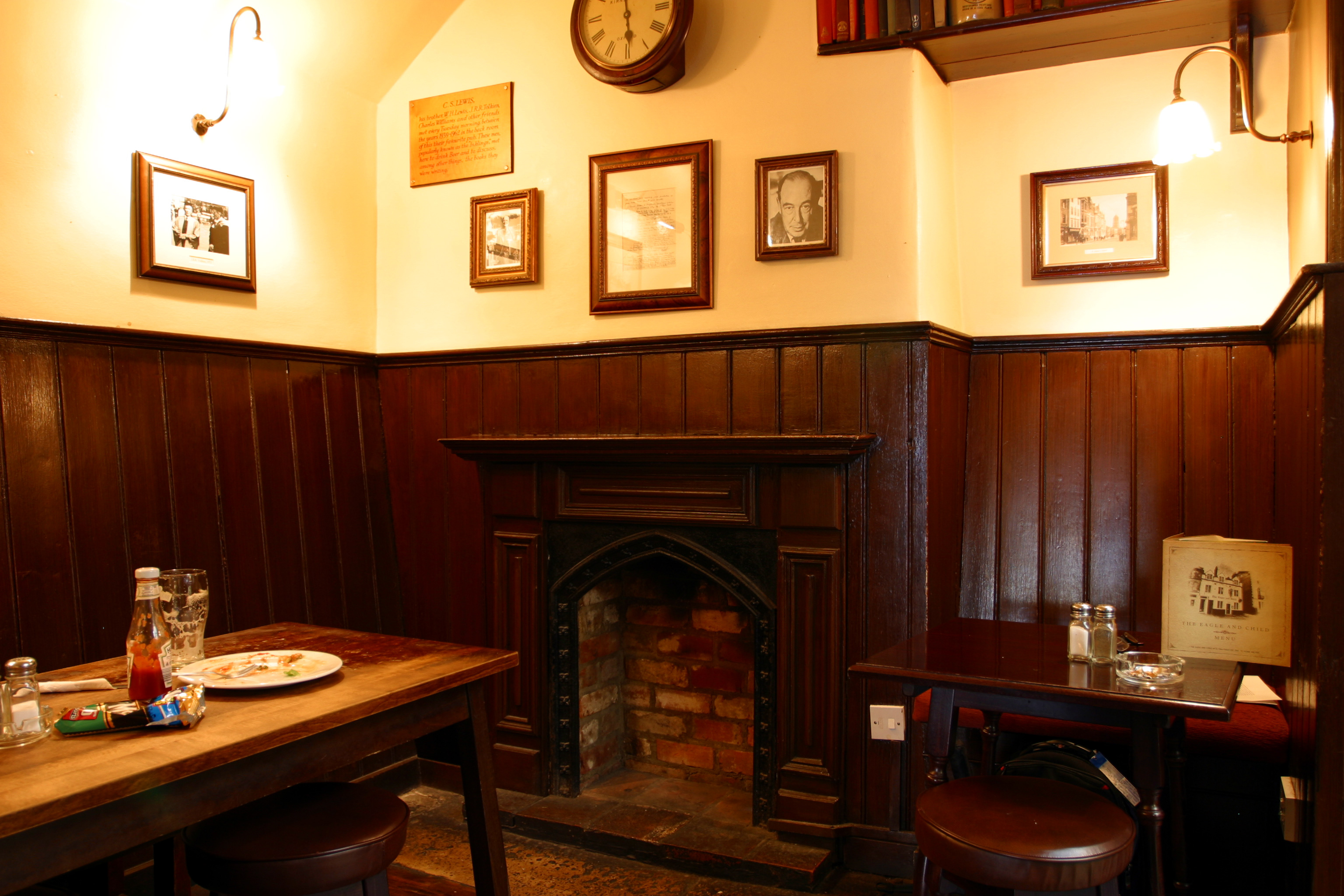
The former Rabbit Room contains mementos of The Inklings.

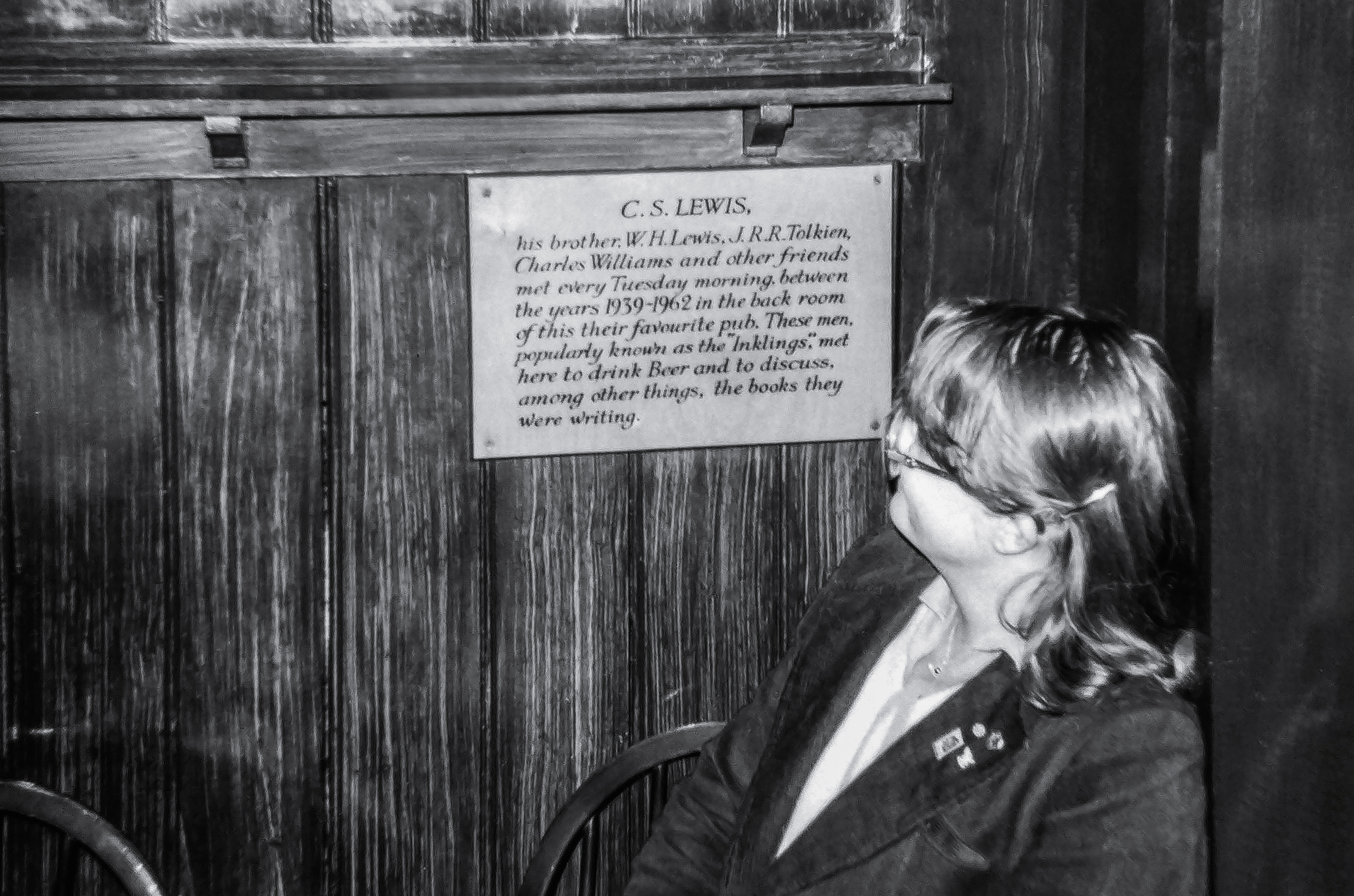
The plaque to the Inklings in 1979, with a member of The Tolkien Society

== In popular culture ==
The Eagle and Child featured in Colin Dexter's novel The Secret of Annexe 3, in which Inspector Morse and Sergeant Lewis read the wooden plaque to the Inklings in the pub's back bar. It was also used as a location in the television series Inspector Morse in the 1991 episode "Second Time Around", in which it was dressed up as "Shears Wine Bar".

== Cited sources ==
- Brind, R. K. (2005). A guide to the C.S. Lewis Tour in Oxford. London: Janus. ISBN 9781857566260.
- Carpenter, Humphrey (1979). The Inklings: C.S. Lewis, J.R.R. Tolkien, Charles Williams, and their friends. Ballantyne.
- Duriez, Colin (2003). Tolkien and C.S. Lewis: the gift of friendship. Mahwah, New Jersey: Hidden Spring. ISBN 978-1587680267.
- Rothwell, David (2006). The Wordsworth Dictionary of Pub Names. Ware, Herefordshire: Wordsworth Editions. ISBN 978-1840222661.
