= George Stuart Gordon =

British literary scholar

George Stuart Gordon (1881–12 March 1942) was a British literary scholar.

== Life ==
Gordon was educated at the University of Glasgow and Oriel College, Oxford, where he received a First Class in Classical Moderations in 1904, Literae Humaniores in 1906, and the Stanhope Prize in 1905. He was a Fellow of Magdalen College, Oxford, from 1907 to 1915.

Gordon was Professor of English Literature at the University of Leeds from 1913 to 1922. Later, he was Merton Professor of English Literature at Oxford, from 1922 to 1928; President of Magdalen College, Oxford, Professor of Poetry there, and Vice-Chancellor (1938–1941). He was one of the Kolbítar, J. R. R. Tolkien's group of readers of Icelandic sagas. His students at Oxford included the author Sherard Vines.

Gordon famously argued that English Literature was capable of having a widespread and positive influence. In his inaugural lecture for his Merton professorship, he argued that "England is sick, and … English literature must save it. The Churches (as I understand) having failed, and social remedies being slow, English literature has now a triple function: still, I suppose, to delight and instruct us, but also, and above all, to save our souls and heal the State".

His son, George Gordon, was a noted physiologist.

== Works ==
- Henry Peacham's The Compleat Gentleman (1906) editor
- English Literature and the Classics (1912) editor, contribution on Theophrastus
- Mons and the Retreat (1917)
- Medium Aevum and the Middle Age (1925) Society for Pure English Tract 19
- Richard II (Shakespeare) (1925) editor
- On writing and writers, Walter Alexander Raleigh (1926) editor
- Companionable Books (1927)
- Shakespeare's English (1928) Society for Pure English Tract 29
- Anglo-American Literary Relations (1942)
- The Letters of G. S. Gordon, 1902-1942 (Oxford University Press, 1943)
- Shakespearian Comedy and other studies (1945)
- The Discipline of Letters (1946)
- Robert Bridges (1946) Rede Lecture
- More Companionable Books (1947)
- The Lives of Authors (1950)

Academic offices
Preceded by Thomas Herbert Warren	President of Magdalen College, Oxford; 1928–1942	Succeeded by Henry Thomas Tizard
Preceded by Alexander Dunlop Lindsay	Vice-Chancellor of Oxford University; 1938–1941	Succeeded by William David Ross
