= Museum Road =

Short road in central Oxford, England

Coordinates: 51.75796°N 1.25670°W

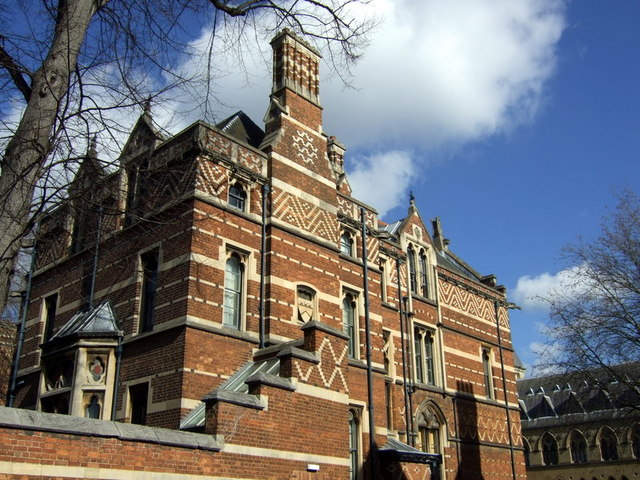
View of Keble College to the north from Museum Road.

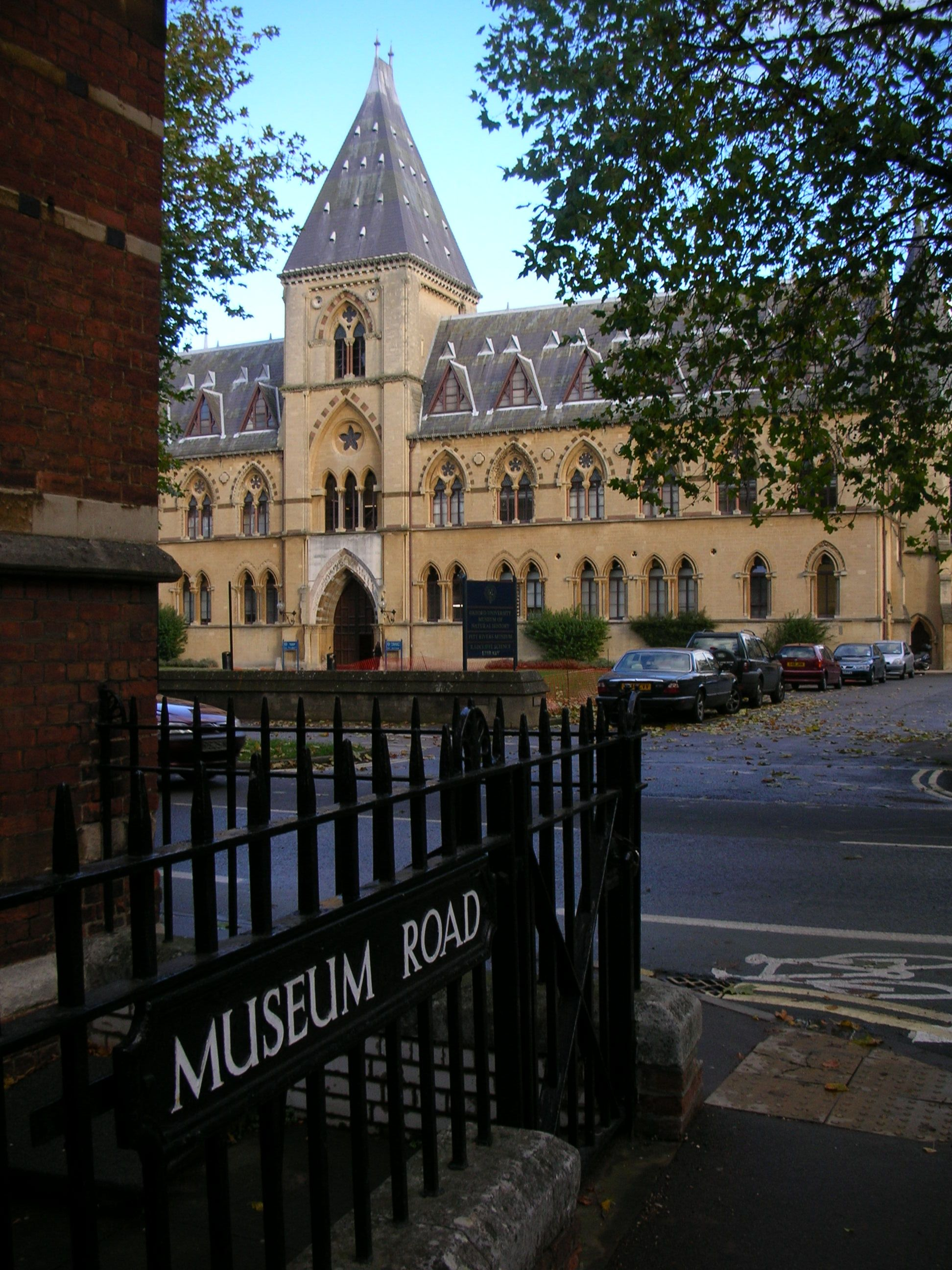
View of the Oxford University Museum of Natural History, across Parks Road from the end of Museum Road.

Museum Road is a short road in central Oxford, England. It leads to the Oxford University Museum of Natural History and the Radcliffe Science Library at its eastern end where it meets Parks Road. At its west end is a junction with Blackhall Road. It continues as the Lamb & Flag Passage past the Lamb & Flag public house on St Giles', a meeting place of J.R.R. Tolkien and the Inklings.

To the north is the Victorian brick Keble College, including the 20th century De Breyne building and quad. To the south at the western end is the much older St John's College. St John's also owns land and properties on the north side of Museum Road at its western end.

Lincoln College also owns twelve of the terraced houses on south side of the road, which are used for student accommodation. In 2003–05, these were refurbished and named Lincoln Hall, used for 70 undergraduate students. In addition, a new student accommodation block (the Lincoln EPA Science Block) was built in the gardens behind them, to house 48 graduate students in the life sciences. This was built with a grant from the Edward Penley Abraham (EPA) Trust.

The road was formerly known as Museum Terrace in the 1870s–1880s, with Museum Villas on the north side.

== See also ==
- Museum Lane, London
