= St John's College, Oxford =

College of the University of Oxford

St John's College
- University of Oxford
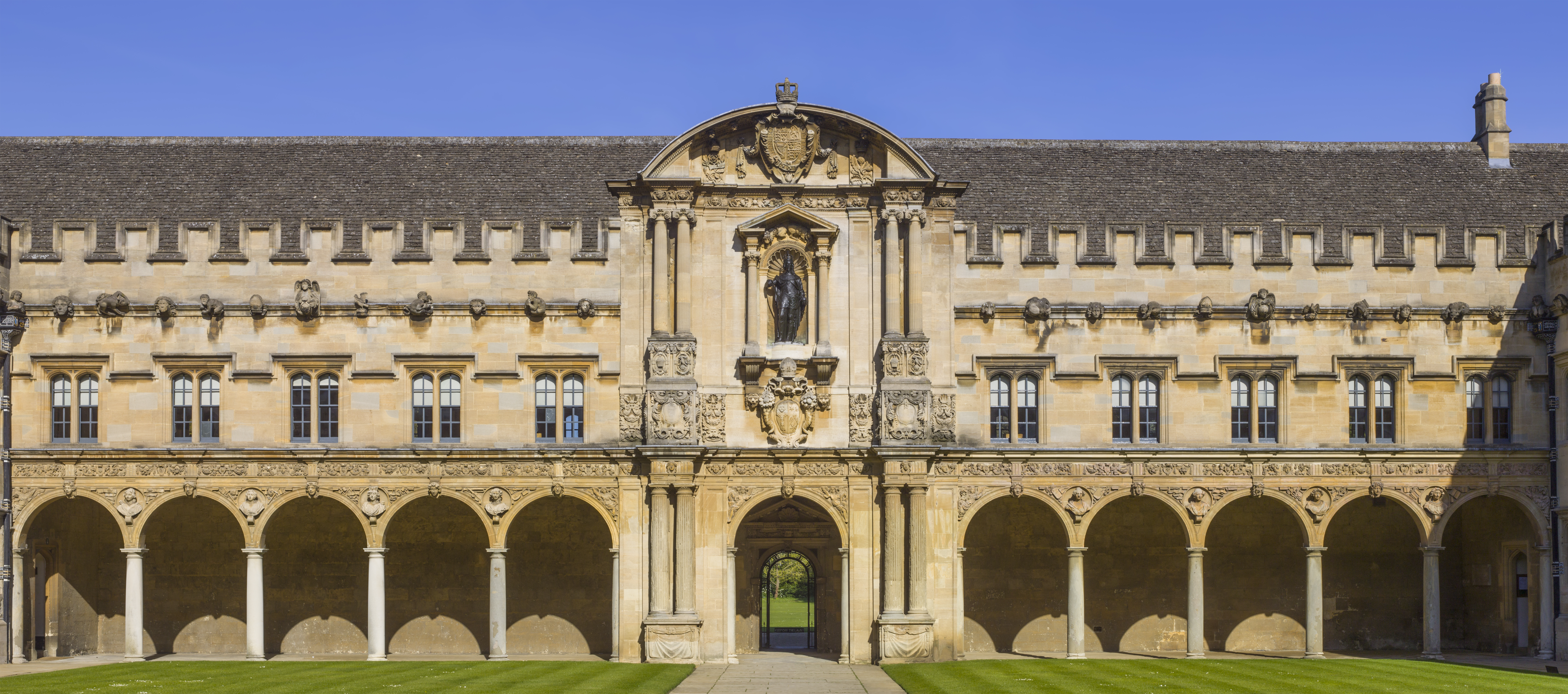
- Canterbury Quad

- Arms: of St John's College, Oxford (arms of Sir Thomas White): Gules, an annulet in chief or on a canton ermine a lion rampant sable a bordure of the fourth charged with eight estoiles of the second
- Location: St Giles, Oxford OX1 3JP, UK
- Coordinates: 51.75612°N 1.258605°W
- Full name: Saint John Baptist College
- Latin name: Collegium Divi Joannis Baptistae, Collegium Sancti Johannis Baptistae
- Founder: Sir Thomas White
- Established: 1555; 471 years ago
- Named for: John the Baptist
- Sister college: Sidney Sussex College, Cambridge
- President: Sue Black, Baroness Black of Strome
- Undergraduates: 419 (2022)
- Postgraduates: 244 (2022)
- Endowment: £712.2 million (2022)
- Website: www.sjc.ox.ac.uk
- JCR: www-jcr.sjc.ox.ac.uk
- MCR: mcr.sjc.ox.ac.uk
- Boat club: SJCBC

Map
- Location within Oxford city centre

St John's College is a constituent college of the University of Oxford. Founded as a men's college in 1555, it has been coeducational since 1979. Its founder, Sir Thomas White, intended to provide a source of educated Roman Catholic clerics to support the Counter-Reformation under Queen Mary.

St John's is the wealthiest college in Oxford, with assets worth over £790 million as of 2022, largely due to nineteenth-century suburban development of land in the city of Oxford of which it is the ground landlord.

The college occupies a site on St Giles' and in 2024 had a student body of 419 undergraduates and 244 postgraduates. There are over 100 academic staff, and a like number of other staff. In 2018 St John's topped the Norrington Table, the annual ranking of Oxford colleges' final results, and in 2021, St John's ranked second with a score of 79.8.

== History ==
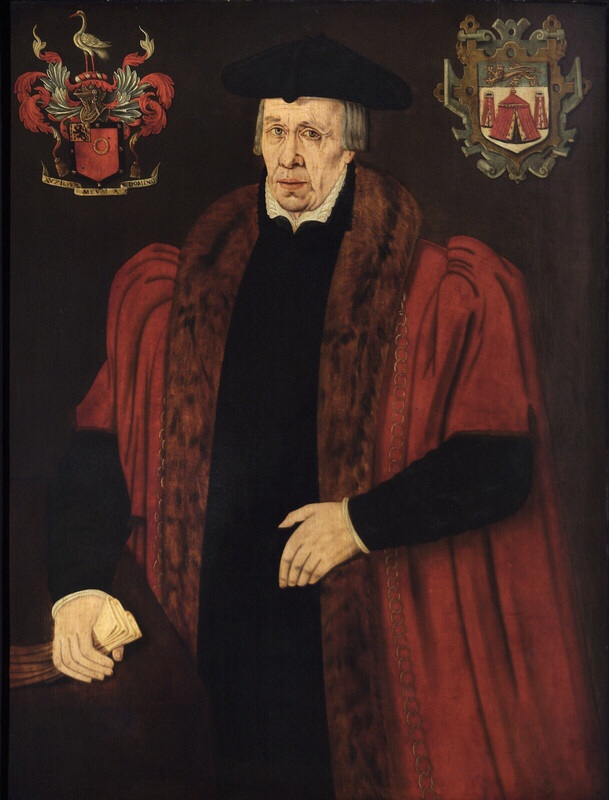
Thomas White, founder of the college

On 1 May 1555, Sir Thomas White, lately Lord Mayor of London, obtained a Royal Patent of Foundation to create a charitable institution for the education of students within the University of Oxford. White, a Roman Catholic, originally intended St John's to provide a source of educated Roman Catholic clerics to support the Counter-Reformation under Queen Mary, and indeed Edmund Campion, the Roman Catholic martyr, studied here.

White acquired buildings on the east side of St Giles', north of Balliol and Trinity Colleges, which had belonged to the former College of St Bernard, a monastery and house of study of the Cistercian order that had been founded in 1437 and closed in 1540 during the dissolution of the monasteries. The grant also included half of the grove of Durham College, which had likewise been suppressed and whose buildings had become Trinity College. Initially the new St John's College was rather small and not well endowed financially. During the reign of Elizabeth I the fellows lectured in rhetoric, Greek, and dialectic, but not directly in theology. However, St John's initially had a strong focus on the creation of a proficient and educated priesthood.

White was Master of the Merchant Taylors' Company, and established a number of educational foundations, including the Merchant Taylors' School; although the college was closely linked to such institutions for many centuries, it became a more open society in the later 19th century. (Closed scholarships for students from the Merchant Taylors' School, however, persisted until the late 20th century. As well as these, scholarships existed for students from Christ's Hospital, two for Coventry School, two for Bristol Grammar School, two for Reading School and one for Tonbridge School.) Female students were first admitted in 1979, after over four centuries of the college as an institution for men only. Elizabeth Fallaize was appointed as the first female fellow in 1990.

Although primarily a producer of Anglican clergymen in the earlier periods of its history, St John's also gained a reputation for degrees in law, medicine, and PPE (Philosophy, Politics, and Economics).

=== Endowments ===
The endowments which St John's was given at its foundation, and during the twenty or so years afterward, served it very well and in the second half of the nineteenth century it benefited, as ground landlord, from the suburban development of the city of Oxford and was unusual among colleges for the size and extent of its property within the city. The patronage of the parish of St Giles was included in the endowment of the college by Thomas White. Vicars of St Giles were formerly either fellows of the college, or ex-fellows who were granted the living on marriage (when Oxford fellows were required to be unmarried). The college retains the right to present candidates for the benefice to the bishop. Today St John's maintains the largest endowment of the Oxford colleges, for example owning the Oxford Playhouse building and the Millwall F.C. training ground.

In January 2020, students carried out a five-day occupation on the college's front quad to protest against the endowment fund's continued investments in fossil fuels.

== Buildings ==
The college is situated on a single 5.5-hectare (55,000 m^{2}) site. Most of the college buildings are organised around seven quadrangles (quads).

=== Front Quadrangle ===
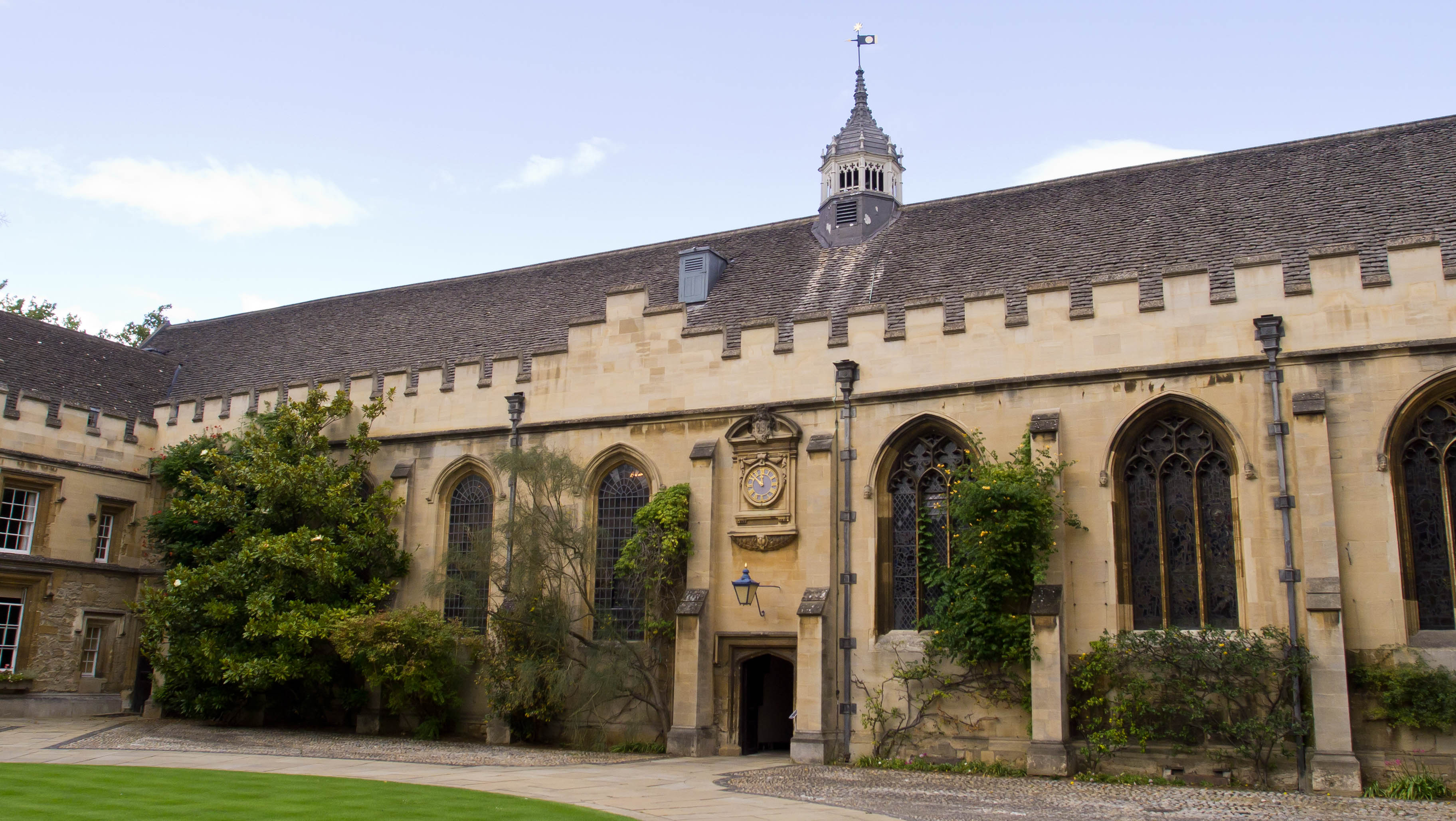
Front Quad

The Front Quadrangle mainly consists of buildings built for the Cistercian St Bernard's College. Construction started in 1437, though when the site passed to the crown in 1540, due to the dissolution of the monasteries, much of the exterior was as it is now, but the Eastern range was incomplete. Christ Church took control of the site in 1546 and Thomas White acquired it in 1554. He made major alterations to create the current college hall, and designated the Northern part of the Eastern range as the lodging of the president, for which it is still used today. Front Quad was gravelled until the college's 400th anniversary when the current circular lawn and paving were laid out.

The turret clock, made by John Knibb, dates from 1690. The main tower above the Porters' Lodge features a statue of John the Baptist by Eric Gill.

==== Chapel ====
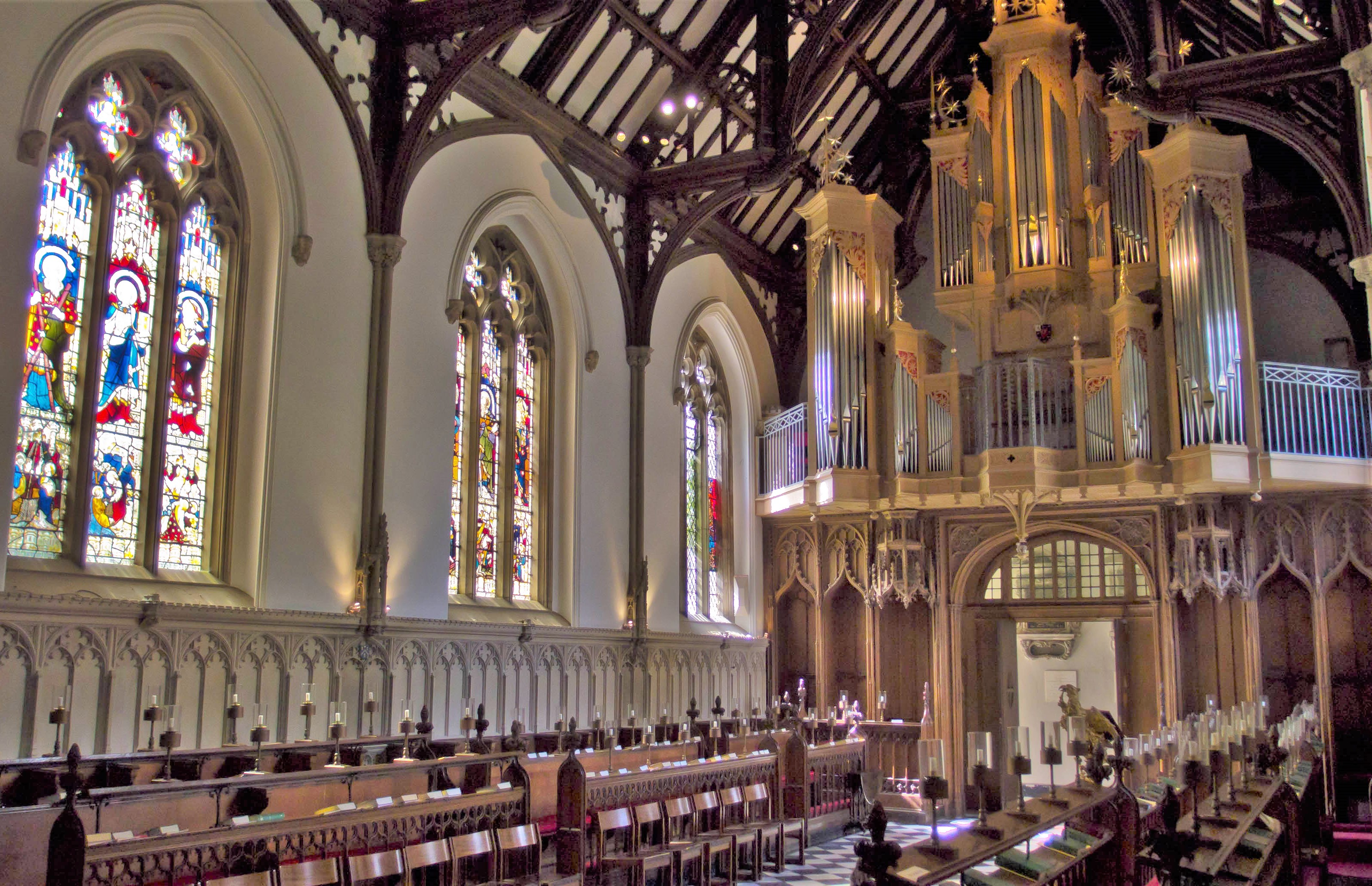
The Chapel facing west

The chapel was built in 1530, dedicated to St Bernard of Clairvaux. It was re-dedicated to St John the Baptist in 1557. The Baylie chapel in the north-east corner was added 1662–69 and refitted in 1949. In 1840 the interior of the chapel underwent major changes which created the gothic revival pews, roof, wall arcading and west screen. Thomas White, William Laud and William Juxon are buried beneath the chapel. All three were presidents of the college, with the latter two also holding the office of Archbishop of Canterbury. To the south of the chancel is a hidden pew directly accessible from the President's Lodgings, which historically allowed the only woman in college, the president's wife, to worship without distracting college members.

Choral services have been sung in the chapel since 1618. Orlando Gibbons's famous anthem "This is the Record of John" was written at the college's request, and presumably received its first performance here. The college in 1620 commissioned the anthem As they departed from Michael East. The college choir today sings evensong services on Sundays and Wednesdays during term time, as well as singing the grace at Sunday formal hall. Since 1923 the choir has been directed by student organ scholars. The chapel has always held an organ. The present three-manual instrument by Bernard Aubertin was installed in 2008.

=== Canterbury Quadrangle ===
This quad is the first example of Italian Renaissance architecture in Oxford. It was substantially commissioned by Archbishop Laud and completed in 1636.

The college library is here, consisting of four connected parts: The Old Library (south side, built 1596–1598), The Laudian Library (built 1631–1635 above the eastern colonnade, overlooking the garden), The Paddy Room (1971–77) and the new Library and Study Centre, designed by Wright & Wright Architects and opened in 2019. Until moving to the Kendrew Quadrangle in 2010, the Holdsworth Law Library was situated in the neighbouring southwest corner of Canterbury Quadrangle. The college holds Robert Graves' Working Library and in 1936 it acquired the 'A. E. Housman Classics Library', consisting of about 300 books and pamphlets containing hand-written notes by Housman in margins and on loose leaves.

The Holmes Building is a 1794 south spur off the Canterbury Quad, containing fellows' rooms.

=== North Quadrangle ===
The North Quadrangle was not designed as a whole, but is the irregular product of a series of buildings constructed since the college's foundation.

In 1612 the college's cook, Thomas Clarke, was given permission to build a college kitchen, with residential rooms above. The college bought this building, just north of the hall, from Clarke in 1620 and expanded it during 1642–1643 to produce the current Cook's Building.

In 1676 the first part of today's Senior Common Room was constructed, just north of the chapel. Its ceiling, completed in 1742, features the craftsmanship of Thomas Roberts, who also worked on the Radcliffe Camera and the Codrington Library. Various additions and renovations took place in 1826, 1900, 1936 and 2004–2005. The latest renovation and extension to the Grade I listed building was by MJP Architects and received two awards in 1996, the Design Partnership Award from the National Association of Shopfitters, and the other from the Royal Institute of British Architects.

In 1742 property was bought from Exeter College and between 1794 and 1880 was used for college purposes, known as the Wood Buildings. It was replaced when in 1880 the construction of today's St Giles' range began. What is today thought of as a single building was constructed as several distinct sections. The first part (1880–1881) consisted of the gate tower and the rooms between it and Cook's building to the south. The second part to be constructed (1899–1900) forms the northern half of the St Giles' range. Finally the Rawlinson Building (1909) formed the northern side of the quadrangle. More rooms were added by Edward Maufe in 1933.

With completion of the "Beehive" (1958–1960), made up of irregular hexagonal rooms, the quadrangle took on its current appearance. The Beehive was designed by Michael Powers of the Architects' Co-Partnership and is clad in Portland stone. This Eastern part of the quadrangle previously held the old Fellows' Stables.

=== Dolphin Quadrangle ===
Three houses at 2–4 St Giles' formed the Dolphin Inn. When demolished in 1881 the houses were known as the South Buildings, and used as college accommodation. In 1947–48 the college constructed, at a cost of £43,216, the neo-Georgian Dolphin Quadrangle on the site. It was designed by Edward Maufe. There was a shortage of construction materials in the immediate aftermath of the Second World War, but the college built the new quadrangle with its own timber, stored in Bagley Wood, still owned by the college.

=== Sir Thomas White Quadrangle ===
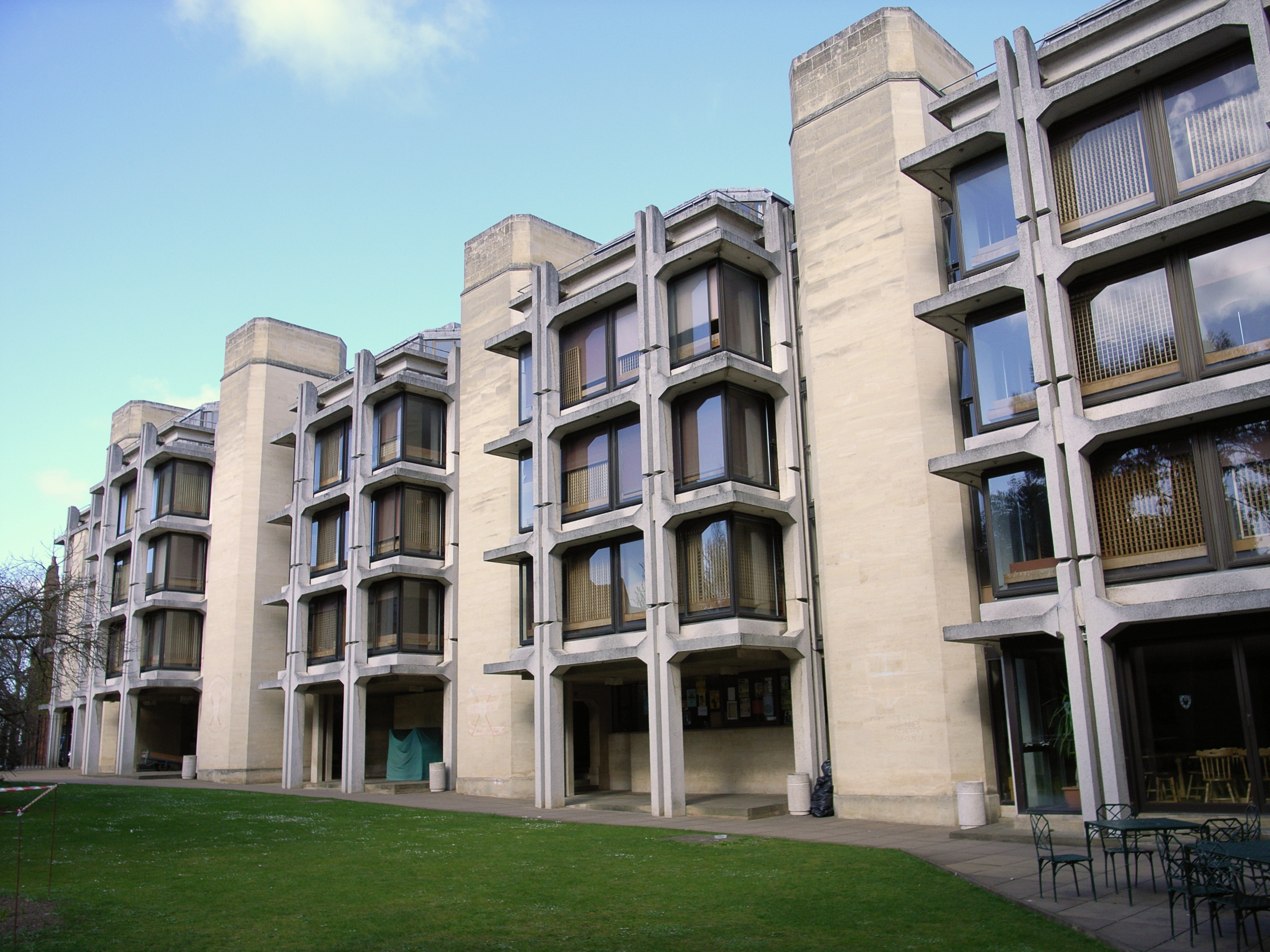
Thomas White Quad

Built in 1972–1975, this is not actually a quadrangle, but an L-shaped building partially enclosing an area of garden. The upper floors are predominantly student residences, but ground floor contains communal facilities including the college bar, TV room, DVD room, and JCR. Underground areas contain the Games Room and Erg Room for rowing. The Prestwich, Larkin, and Graves rooms are multi-purpose and used for a variety of events.

The building is an early design by Philip Dowson of Arup Associates which won both the 1976 Concrete Society Award and the 1981 Royal Institute of British Architects architectural excellence award. It was also Commended in the 2011 Mature Building Category of the Construct: Concrete Awards and became a Grade II listed building in 2017.

=== Garden Quadrangle ===
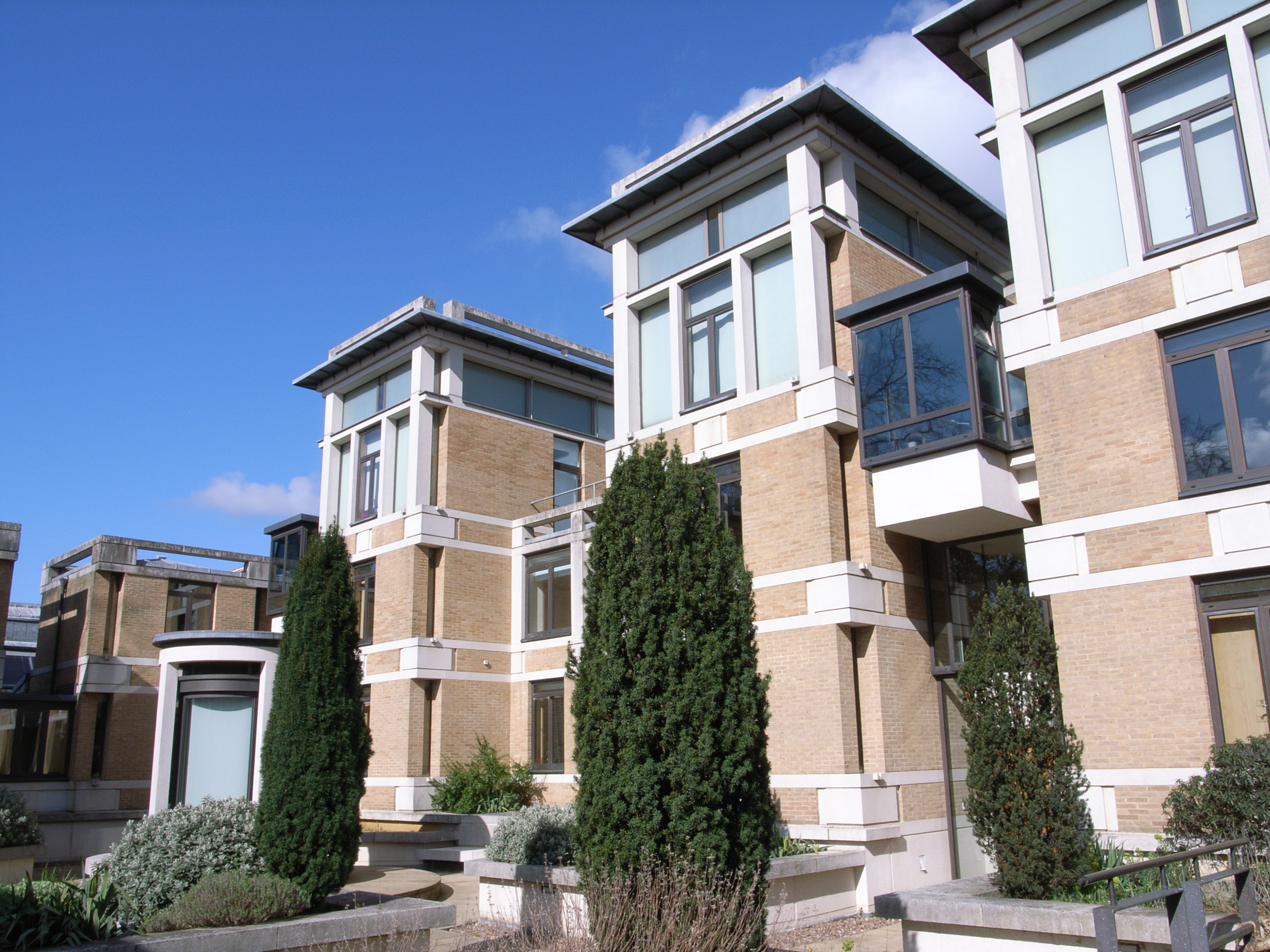
Garden Quad

The Garden Quadrangle is a modern (1993) neo-Italianate design from MJP Architects that includes the college auditorium, student rooms and kitchens. The complex structure is very unlike a conventional quadrangle. After it won five awards (RIBA Award 1995, Civic Trust Award 1995, Oxford Preservation Trust Award 1994, Independent on Sunday Building of the Year 1994 and Concrete Society Award – Overall Winner 1994), a 2003 poll organised by The Oxford Times voted the £7.5m quadrangle the best building erected in Oxford in the preceding 75 years.

The site was previously occupied by the Department of Agriculture, and the Parks Road frontage of this building survives today, separated from the quadrangle by a detached building containing three music rooms.

=== Kendrew Quadrangle ===
The most recent quad, completed in 2010, was also designed by MJP architects. The quad is named after Sir John Kendrew, former president of the college, Nobel Laureate and the college's greatest benefactor of the twentieth century. The construction has been dubbed "the last great quad in the city centre" and is notable for its attempt to provide energy from sustainable sources: much of the energy required to heat the building is provided by a combination of solar panels on the roof, geothermal pipes extending deep below the basement and woodchips from the college wood used to fire the boilers.

As the first phase of The Kendrew Quadrangle project Dunthorne Parker Architects were appointed by the college to refurbish three Grade II Listed buildings fronting on to St Giles. Works were carried out to No 20 St Giles which became alumni residential accommodation, The Black Hall, a 17th-century building, which became teaching accommodation and The Barn, which became an exhibition and performance space.

=== Other properties on St Giles' ===
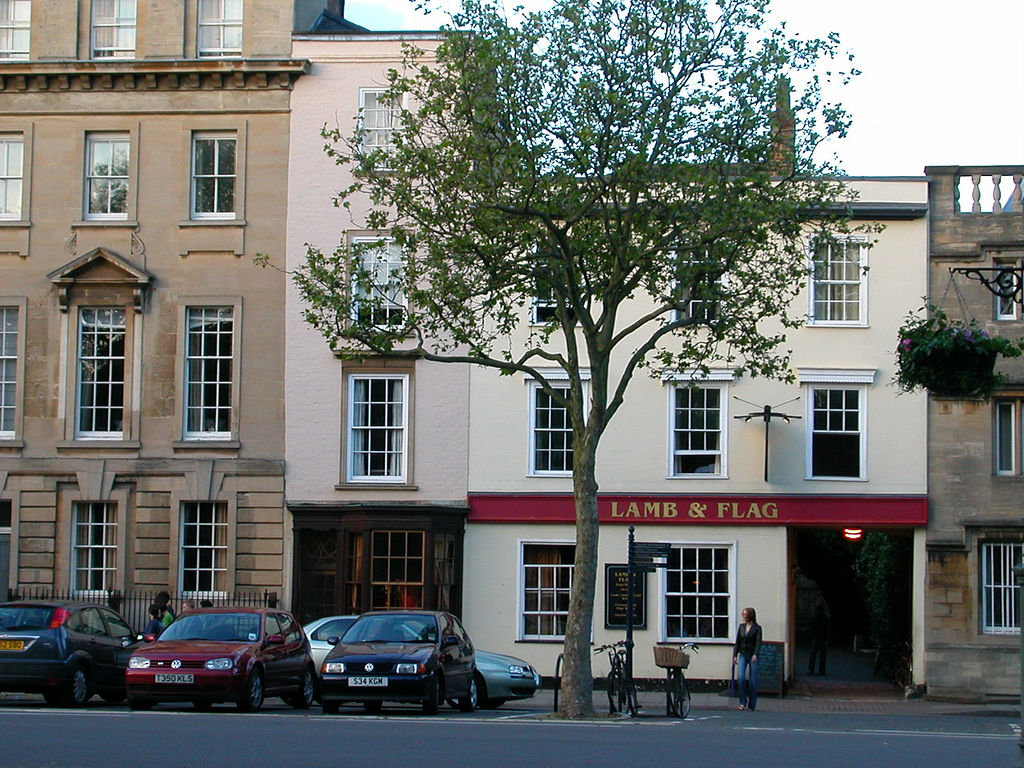
The Lamb & Flag (owned by the college)

The college now owns almost all the buildings on the eastern stretch of St Giles'. Most of these are fairly unnoticeable, with various previous owners, today all used for various college purposes. However a few are more distinctive.

Number 16 is St Giles' House, which dates from 1702; it was described by Nikolaus Pevsner as "the best house of its date in Oxford". It was previously known as The Judge's Lodgings, due to its use between 1852 and 1965 by the judge when visiting for Assizes. It is today used by the college for dinners and receptions, with the upper levels including various rooms for tutors.

The Lamb & Flag pub is owned by the college which up to 2021 operated it, using the profits to fund graduate scholarships.

Middleton Hall is a house, located north of the North Quad and adjoining the Lamb & Flag.

The college also owns properties on the western side of St Giles', including (until its sale by the college in 2023) The Eagle and Child pub (formerly owned by University College, Oxford), where the writers J. R. R. Tolkien and C. S. Lewis often met their literary friends.

=== Gallery ===
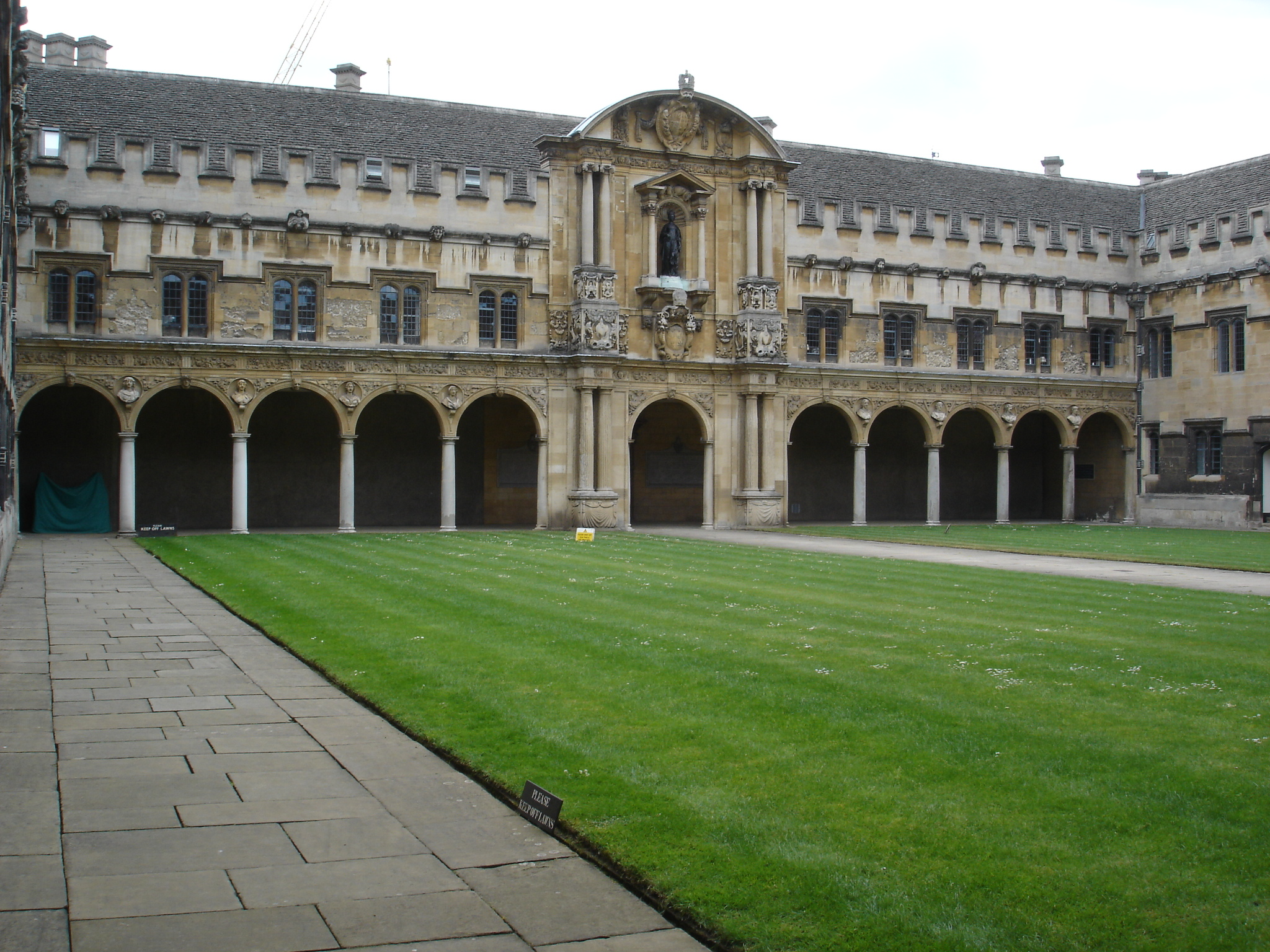
Canterbury Quad

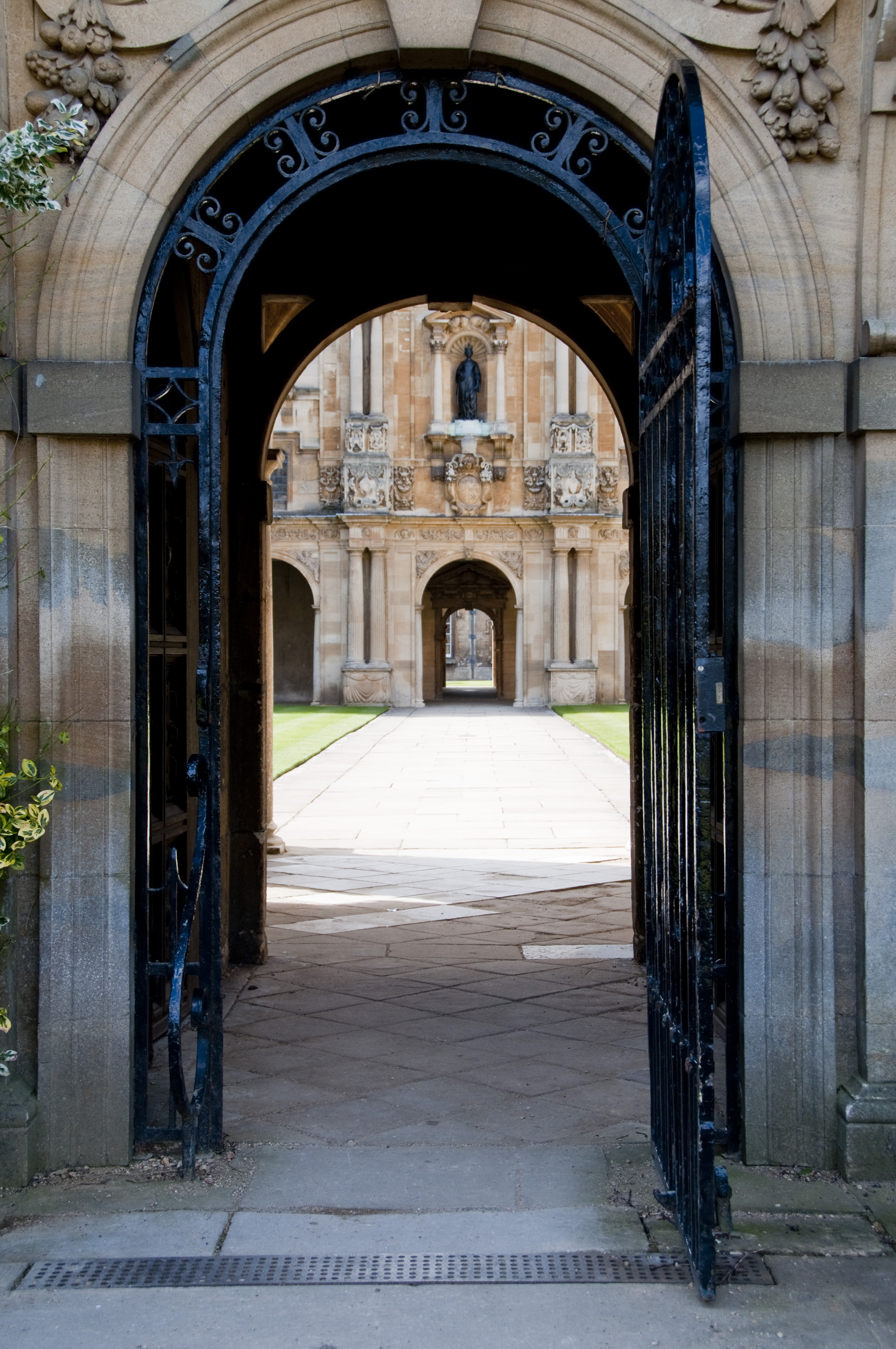
Gate from gardens

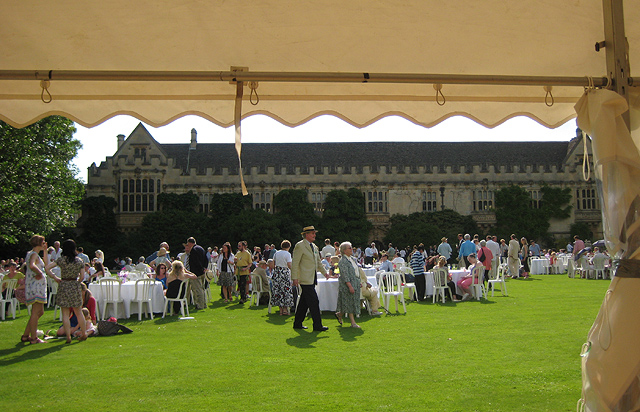
Garden Party in the gardens

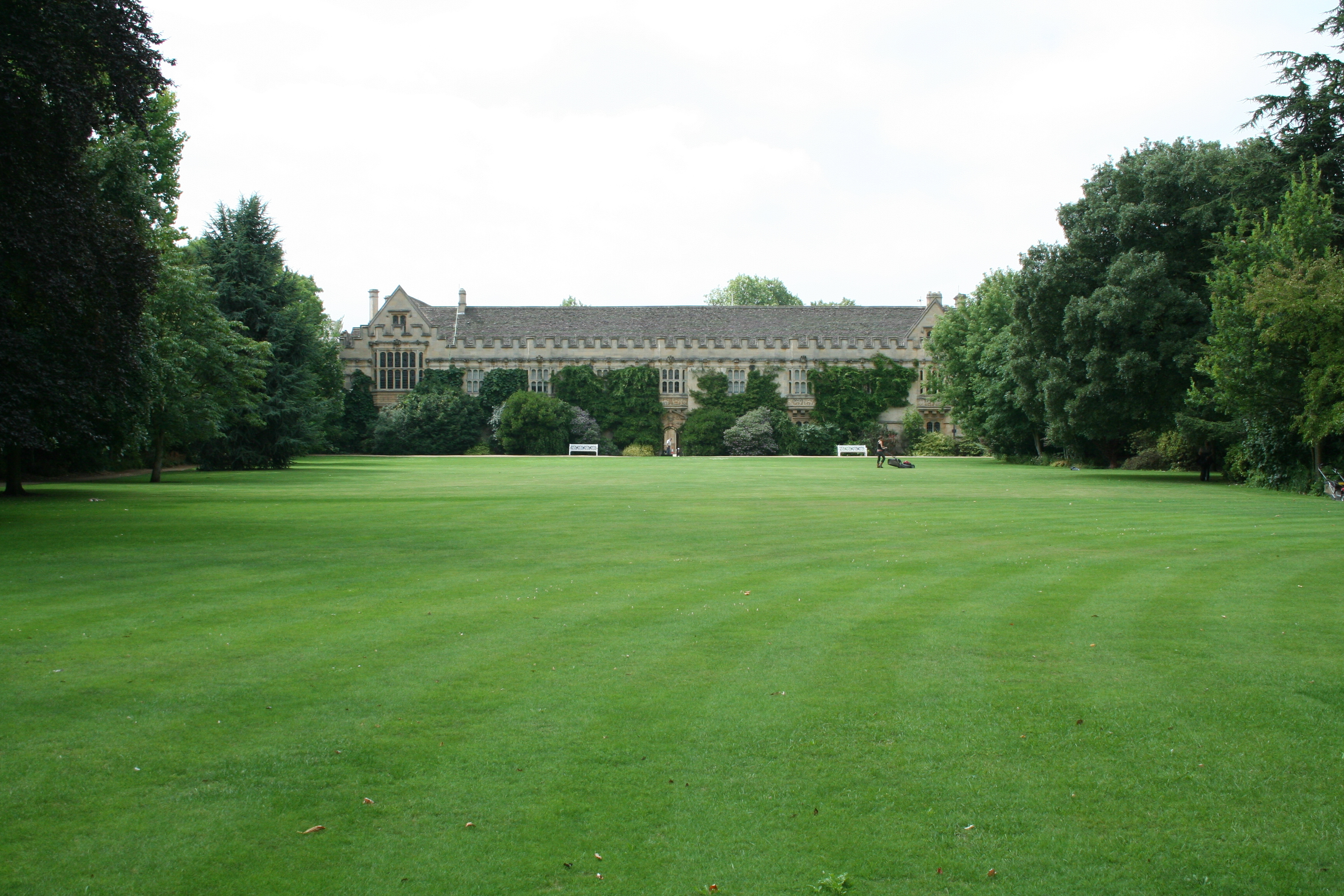
College gardens

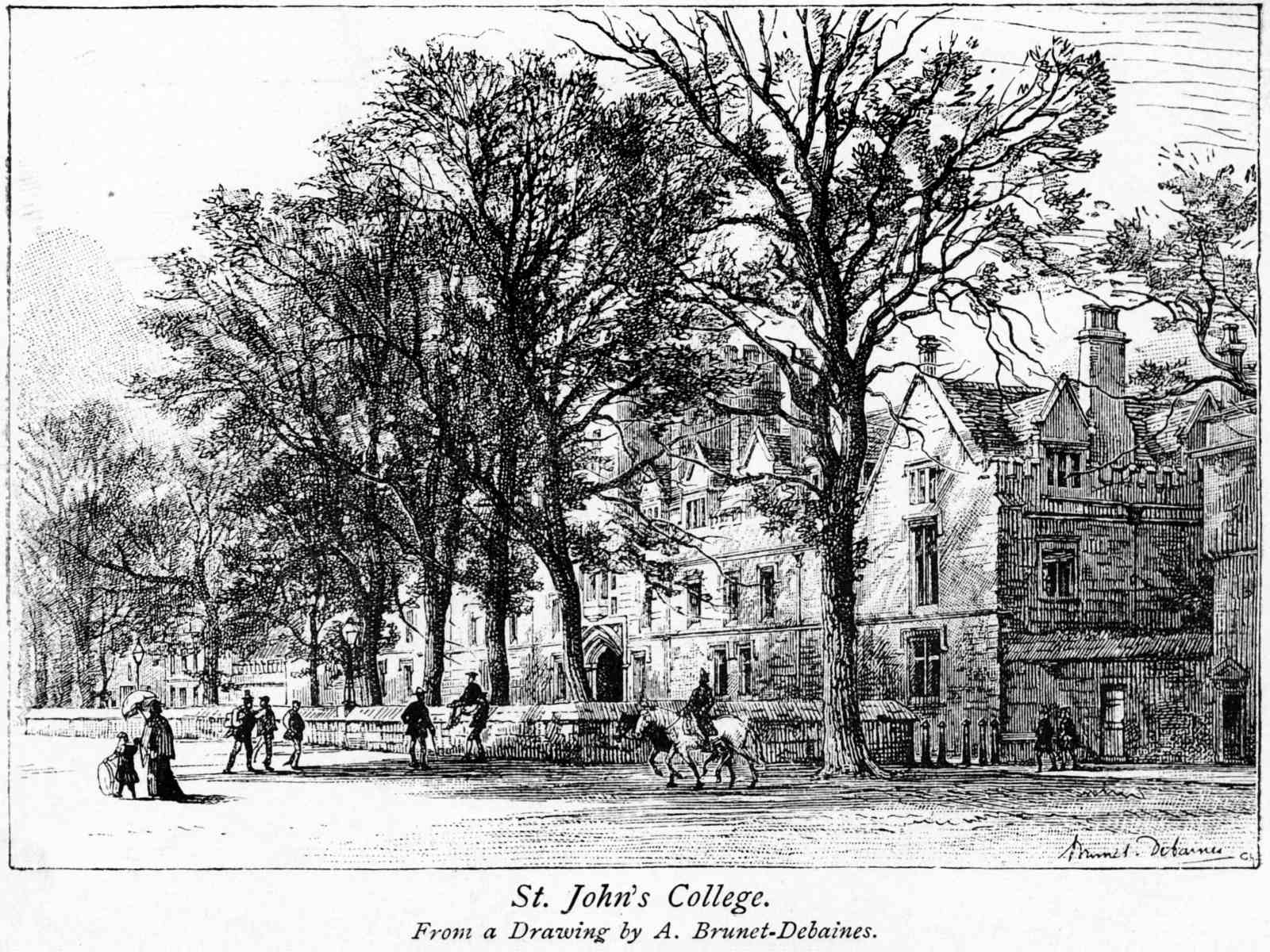
1896 drawing

== Student life ==
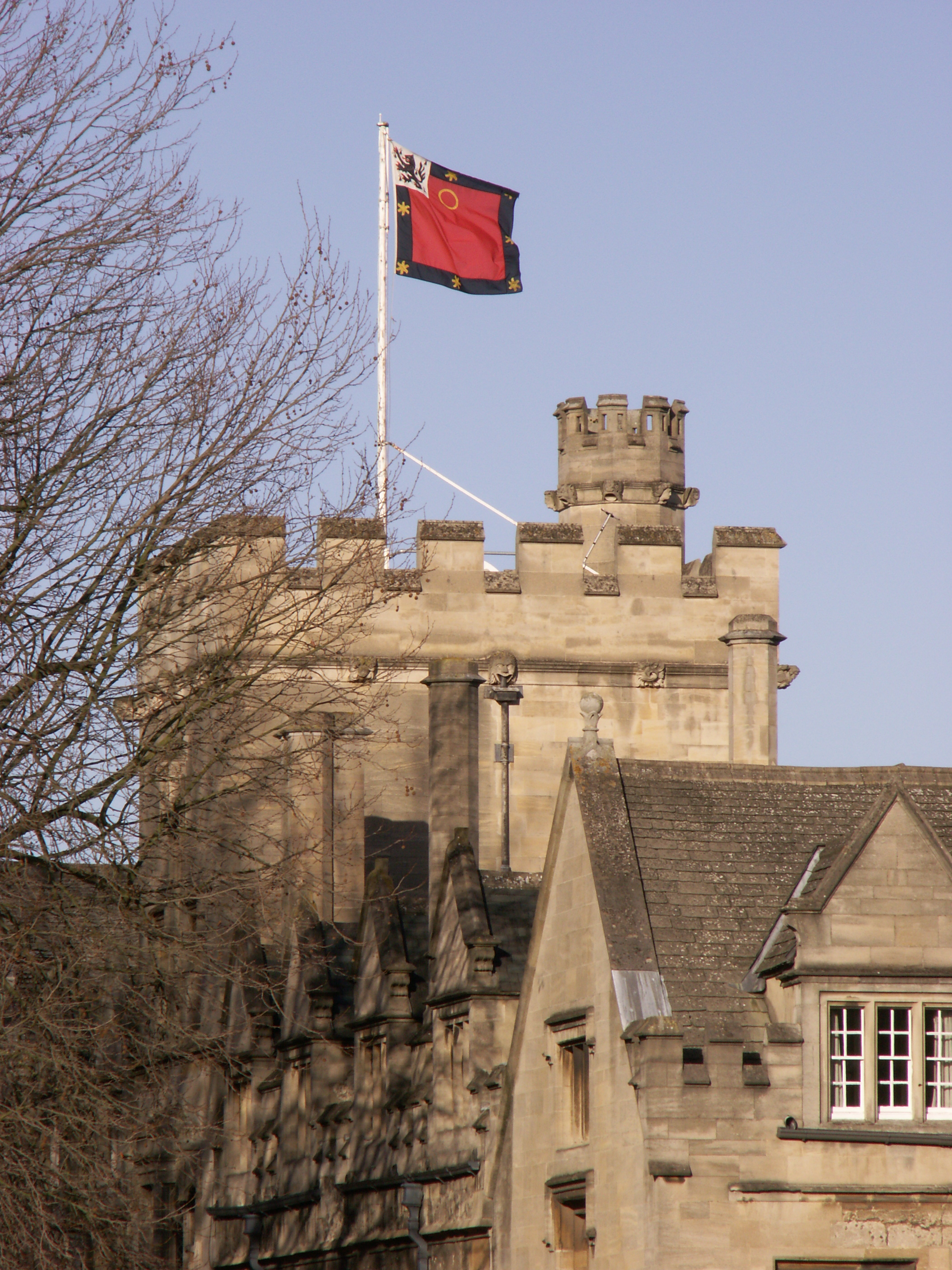
Tower and flag

=== Facilities ===
St John's offers onsite accommodation to all undergraduates for the duration of their course (although students are not obliged to take up this offer). For first years, this is mostly in the Thomas White Quad, with some students also accommodated in the Beehive; the college also accommodates some undergraduates (mostly second years) in houses owned by the college on Museum Road, with some postgraduates in Blackhall Road.

=== Middle Common Room ===
All graduate students are members of the Middle Common Room. The MCR represents graduates in the college, organises events, and maintains graduate facilities. The MCR building was completed in 1998.

=== Societies ===
St John's College Boat Club (SJCBC) is the largest of a number of college sports clubs. In Summer Eights 2013, eight SJCBC boats qualified for the racing, and the women's 1st VIII bumped up to become the Head of the River - the first time any crew from SJCBC has achieved this in the club's 150-year history. The women's 1st Torpid "won blades" three years in succession from 2011 to 2013, and in 2013 also won the right to represent the Oxford colleges in the women's intercollegiate race at the Henley Boat Races.

In 2006 St John's launched SJCtv, becoming the first Oxford college to start its own television station. The college drama group operates under the banner of St John's Mummers. In addition to the chapel choir, the college regularly hosts performances from professional musicians and two non-auditioning ensembles (open to all Oxford students) rehearse in college: the Oxford Open Orchestra and Oxford University Symphonic Band.

== People associated with St John's ==
=== Fellows and alumni ===
Prominent male Fellows and alumni of St John's have included 17th-century Archbishops of Canterbury William Laud and William Juxon, the early Fabian intellectual Sidney Ball, Chief Commissioner of Burma Sir Charles Crosthwaite, former Prime Minister of Canada Lester B. Pearson, former Sudanese prime minister Sadiq al-Mahdi, the poets A. E. Housman, Philip Larkin and Robert Graves and the latter's brother, journalist Charles Graves, the novelist Kingsley Amis, the historian Peter Burke, the biochemist Sir John Kendrew, and former Prime Minister of the United Kingdom Tony Blair. More recent prominent female alumni include Labour MPs Angela Eagle and Rushanara Ali, Professor of Psychology and Cognitive Neuroscience Sarah-Jayne Blakemore, and CEO of Chatham House Bronwen Maddox.

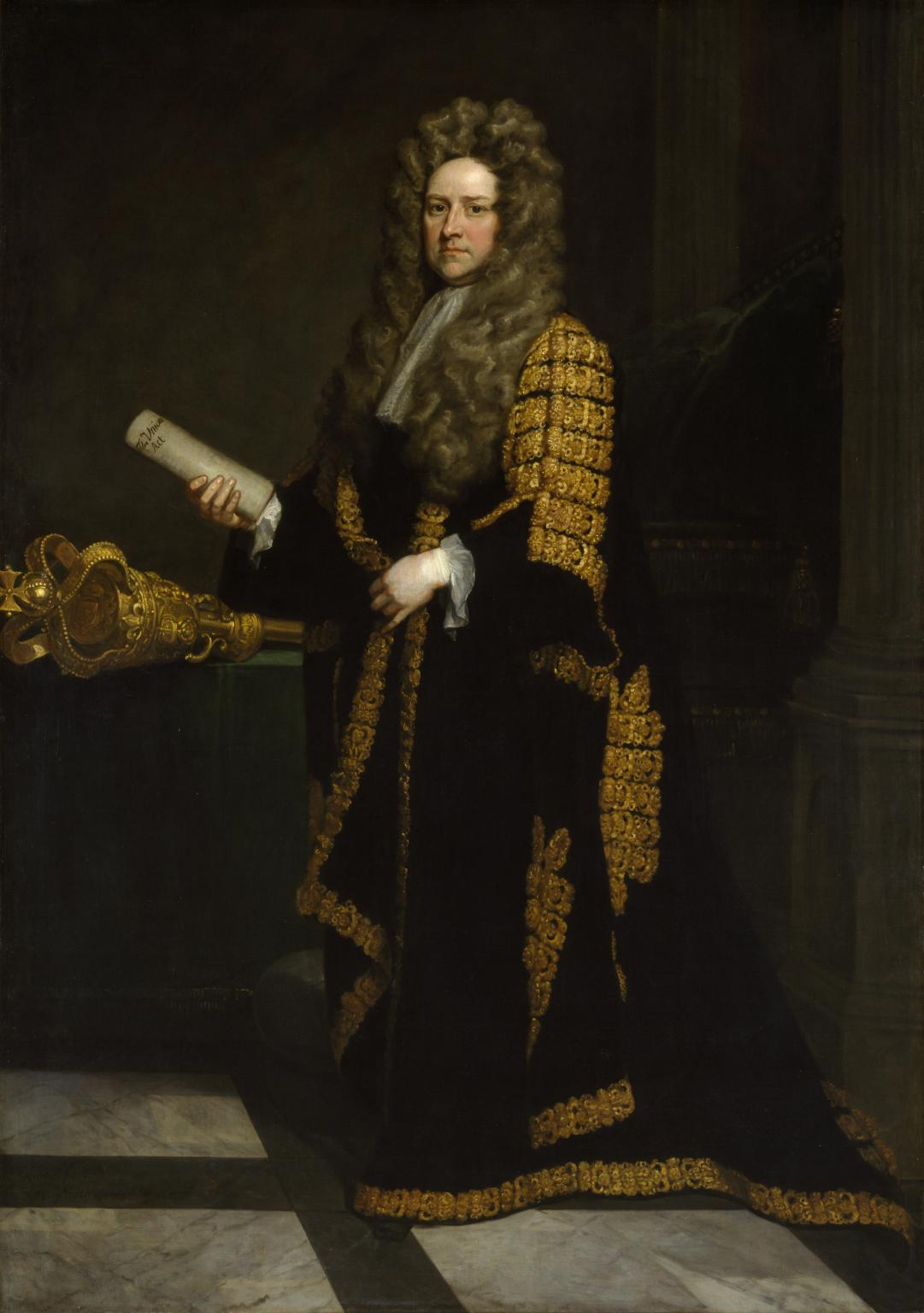
John Smith, Chancellor of the Exchequer

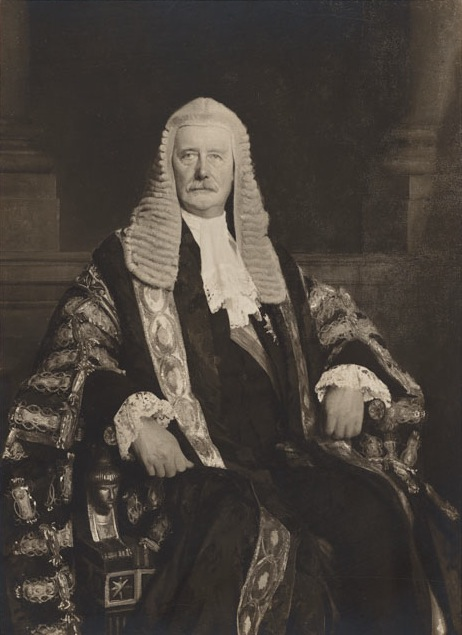
George Cave, 1st Viscount Cave, lawyer and Conservative politician

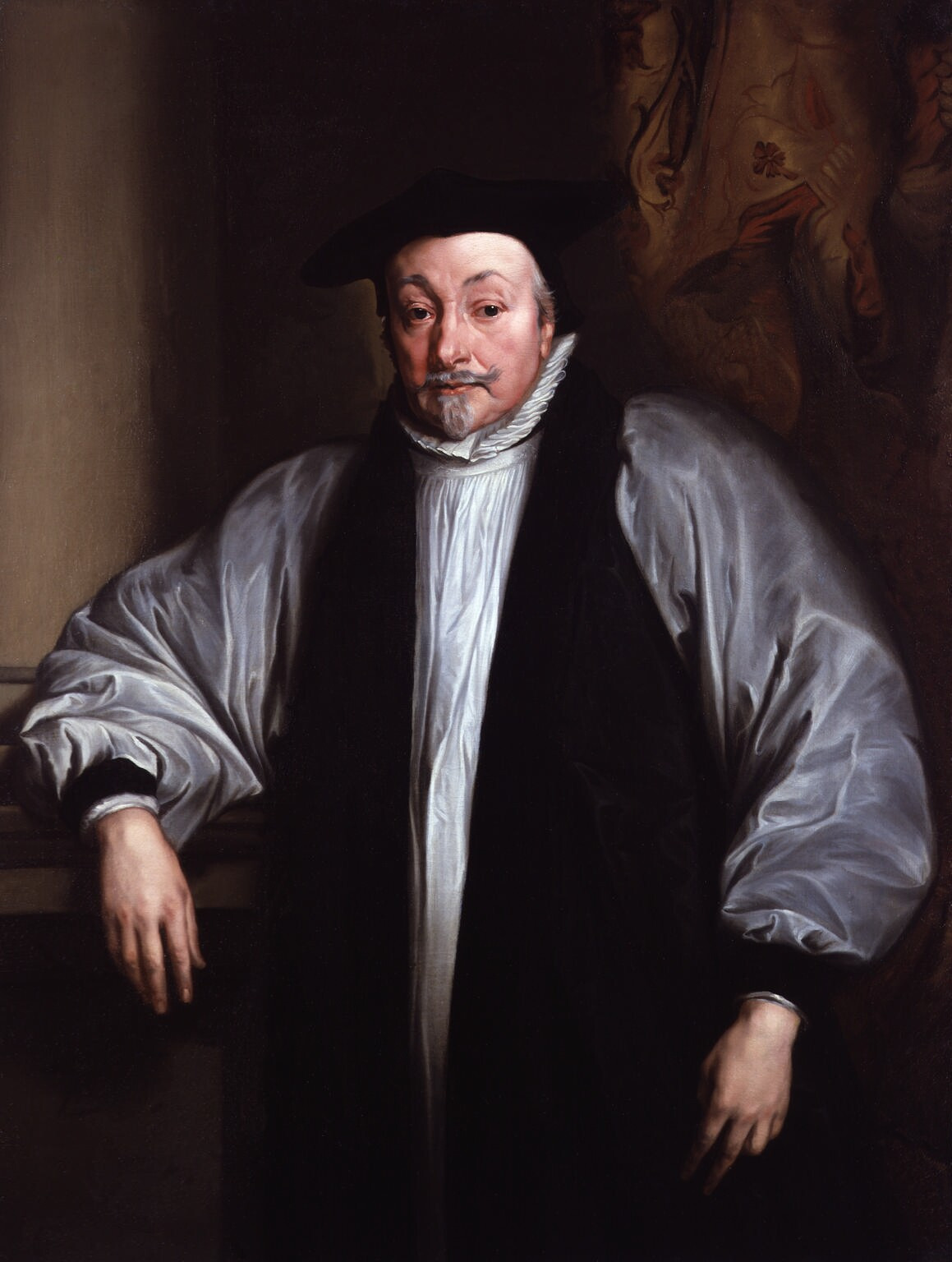
William Laud, 76th Archbishop of Canterbury

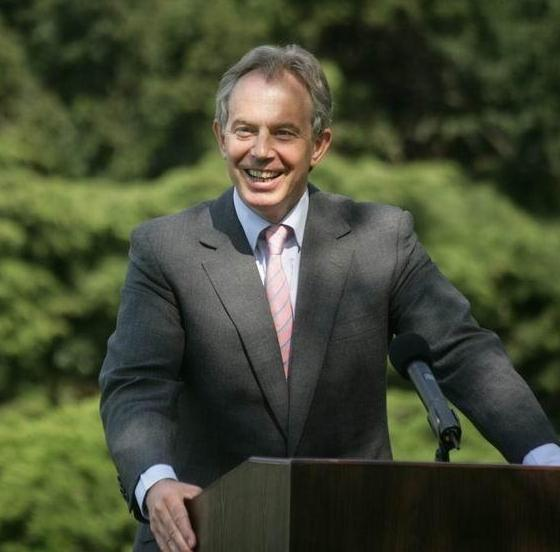
Tony Blair, Prime Minister of the United Kingdom (1997-2007)

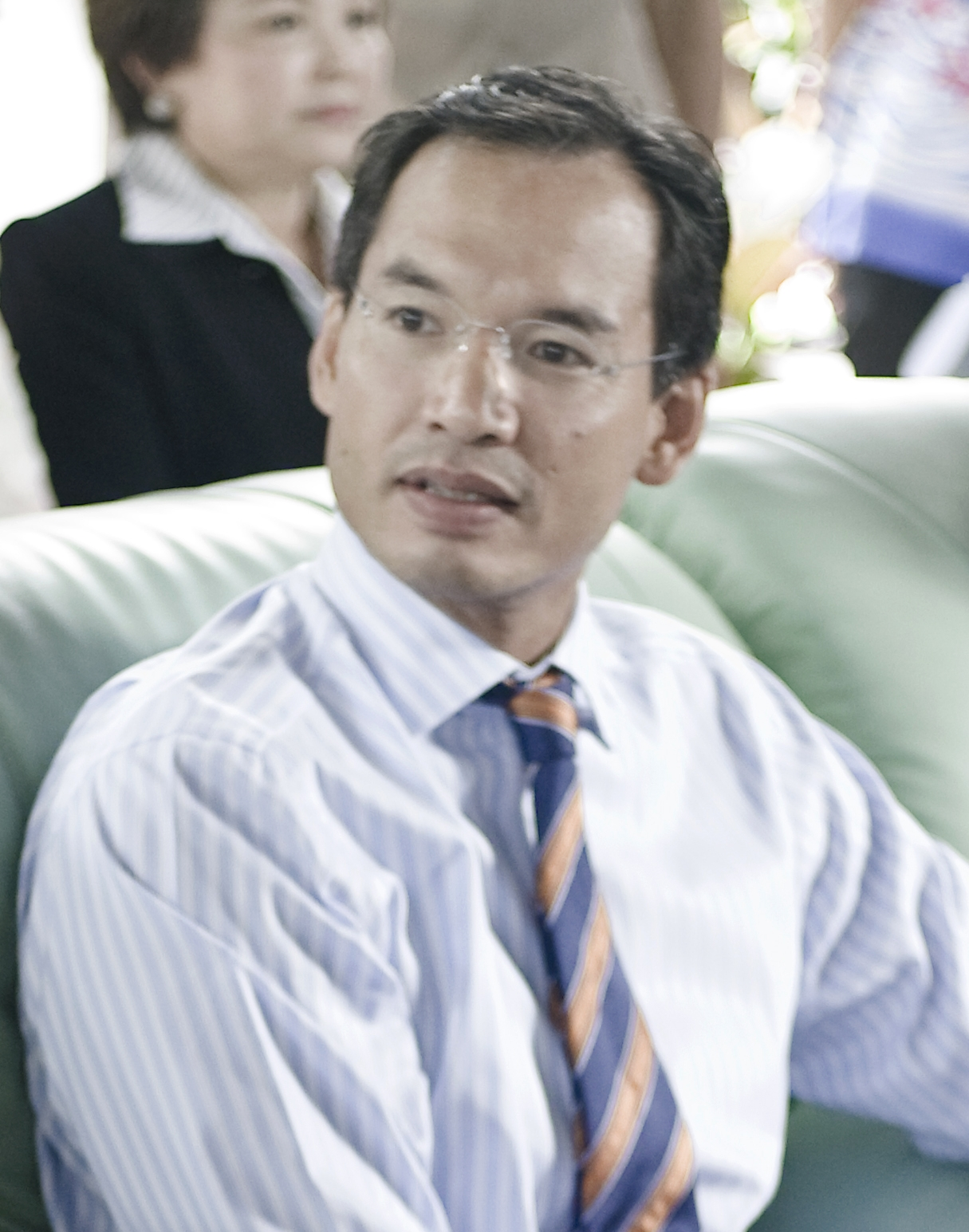
Korn Chatikavanij, former Finance Minister of Thailand

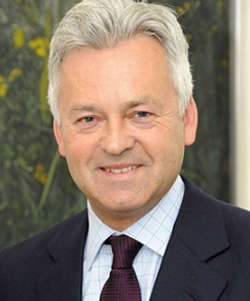
Alan Duncan, Conservative MP

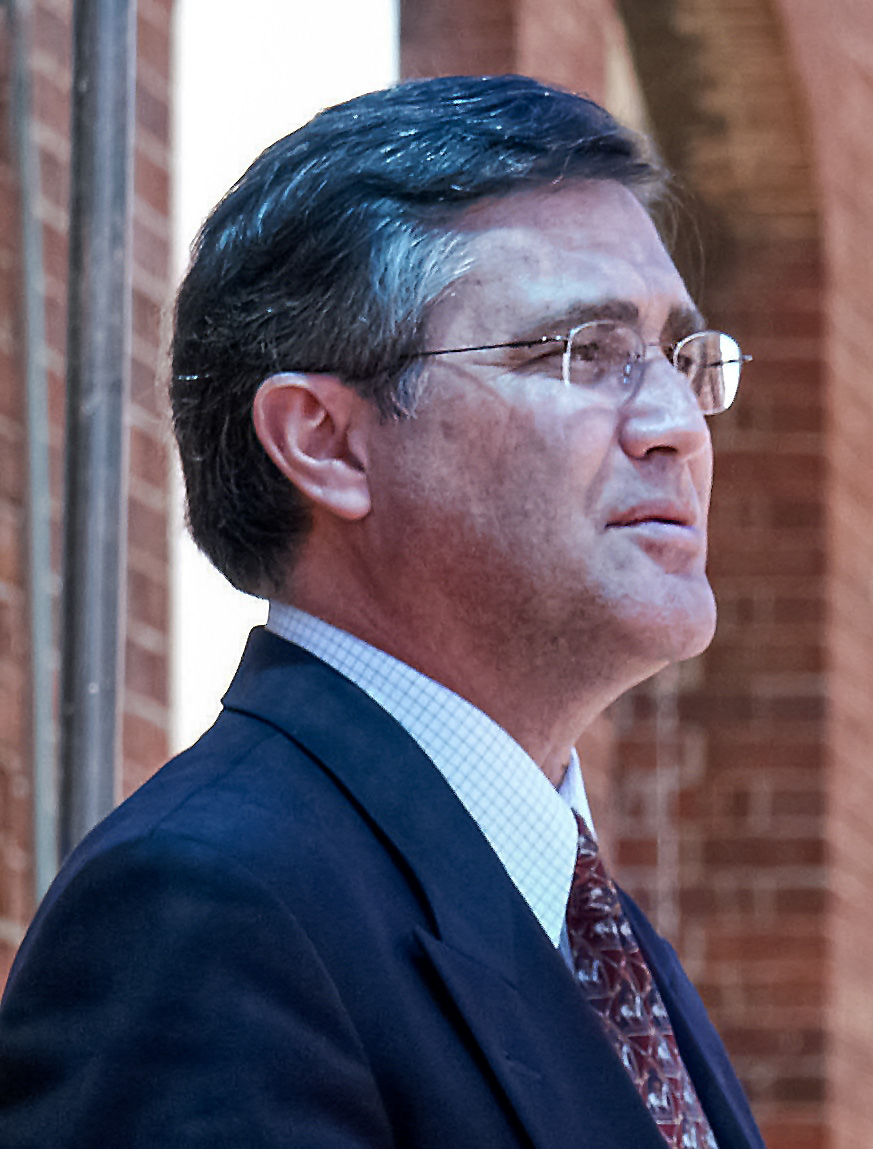
Geoff Gallop, 27th Premier of Western Australia

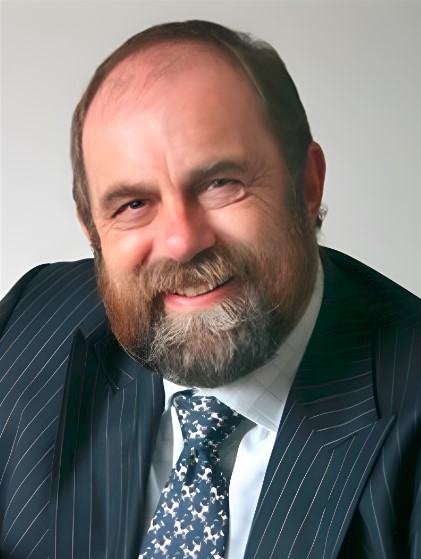
David Heath, Liberal Democrat MP (1997-2015)

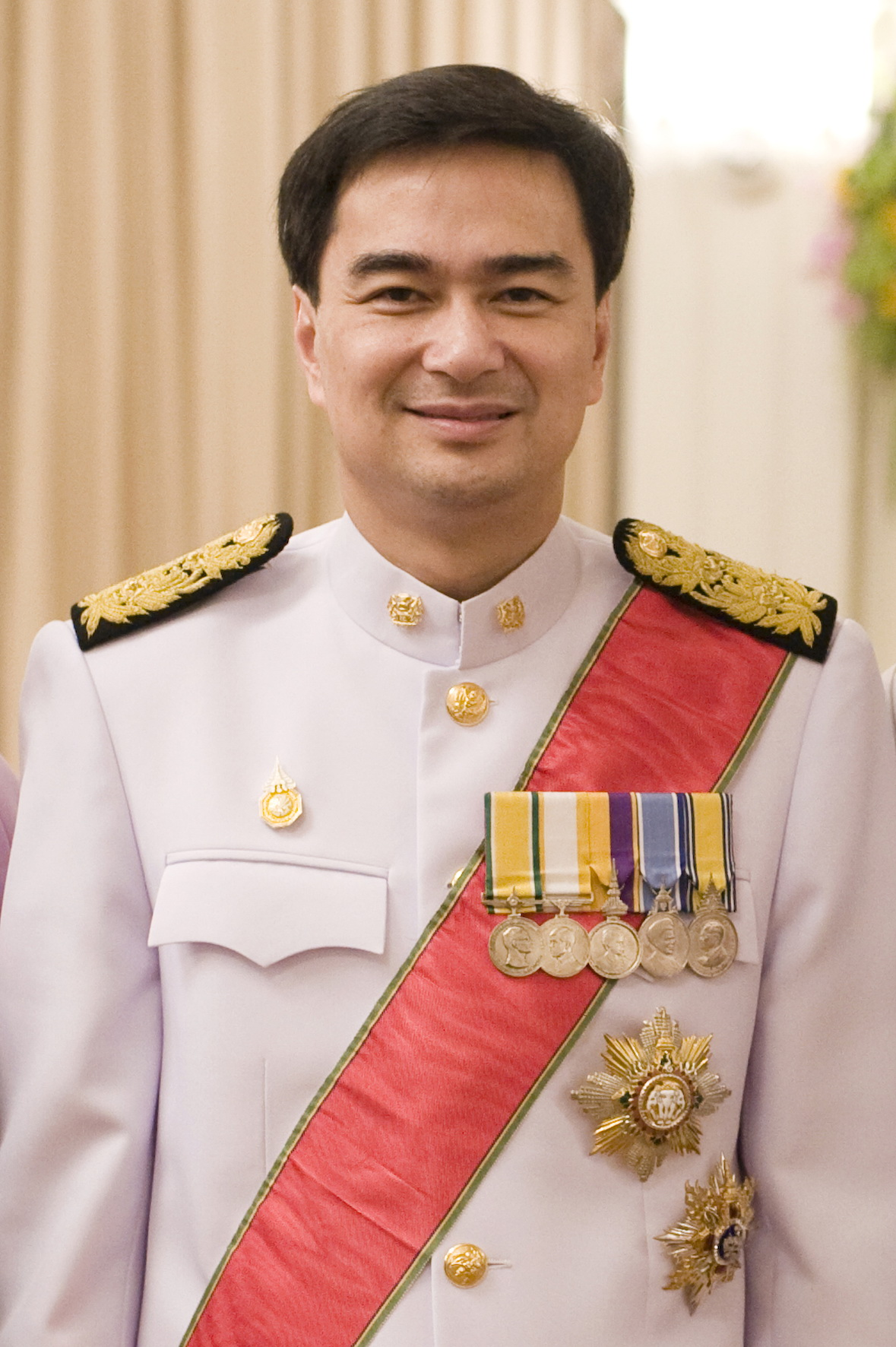
Abhisit Vejjajiva, 27th Prime Minister of Thailand (2008-2011)

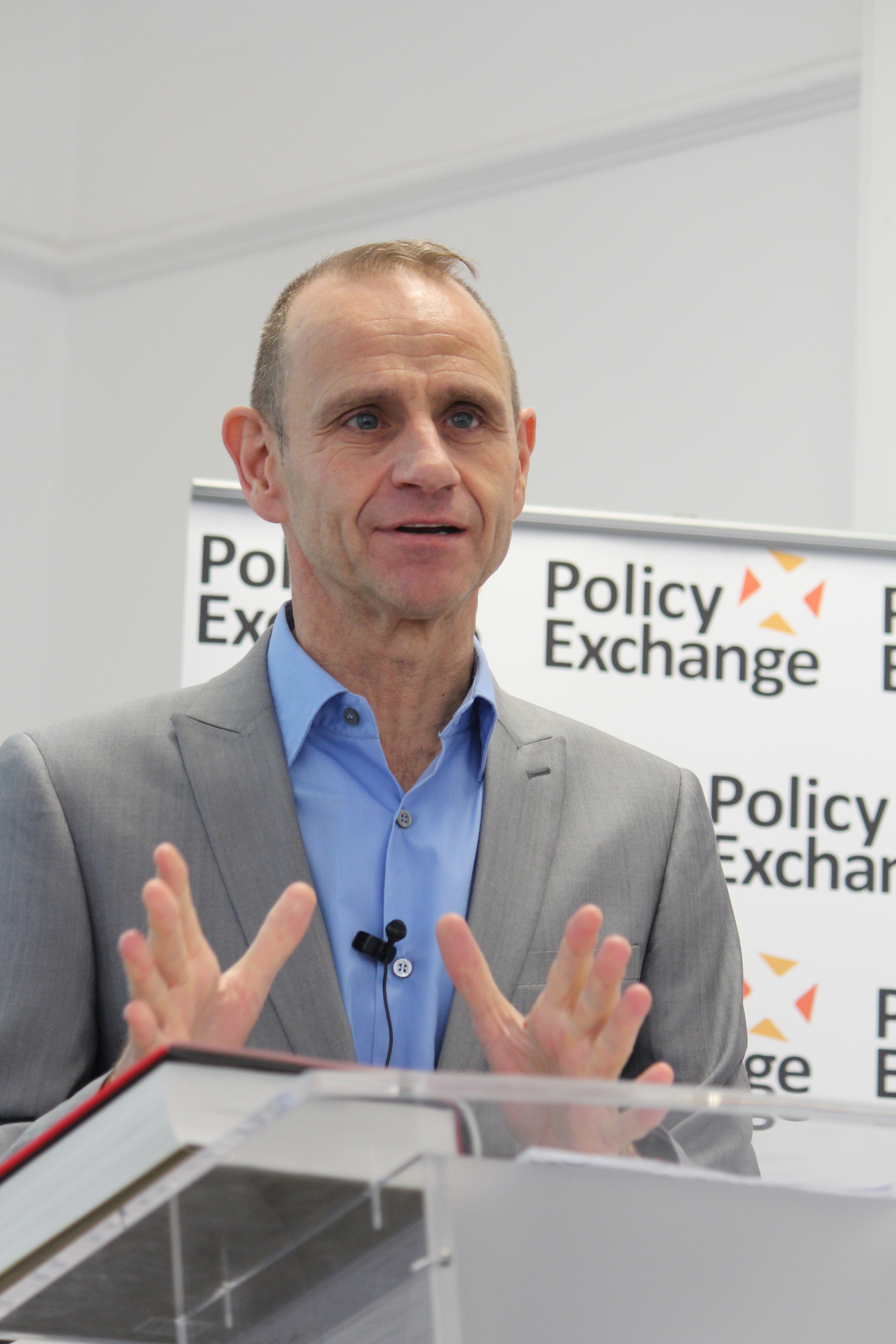
Evan Davis, journalist and TV presenter

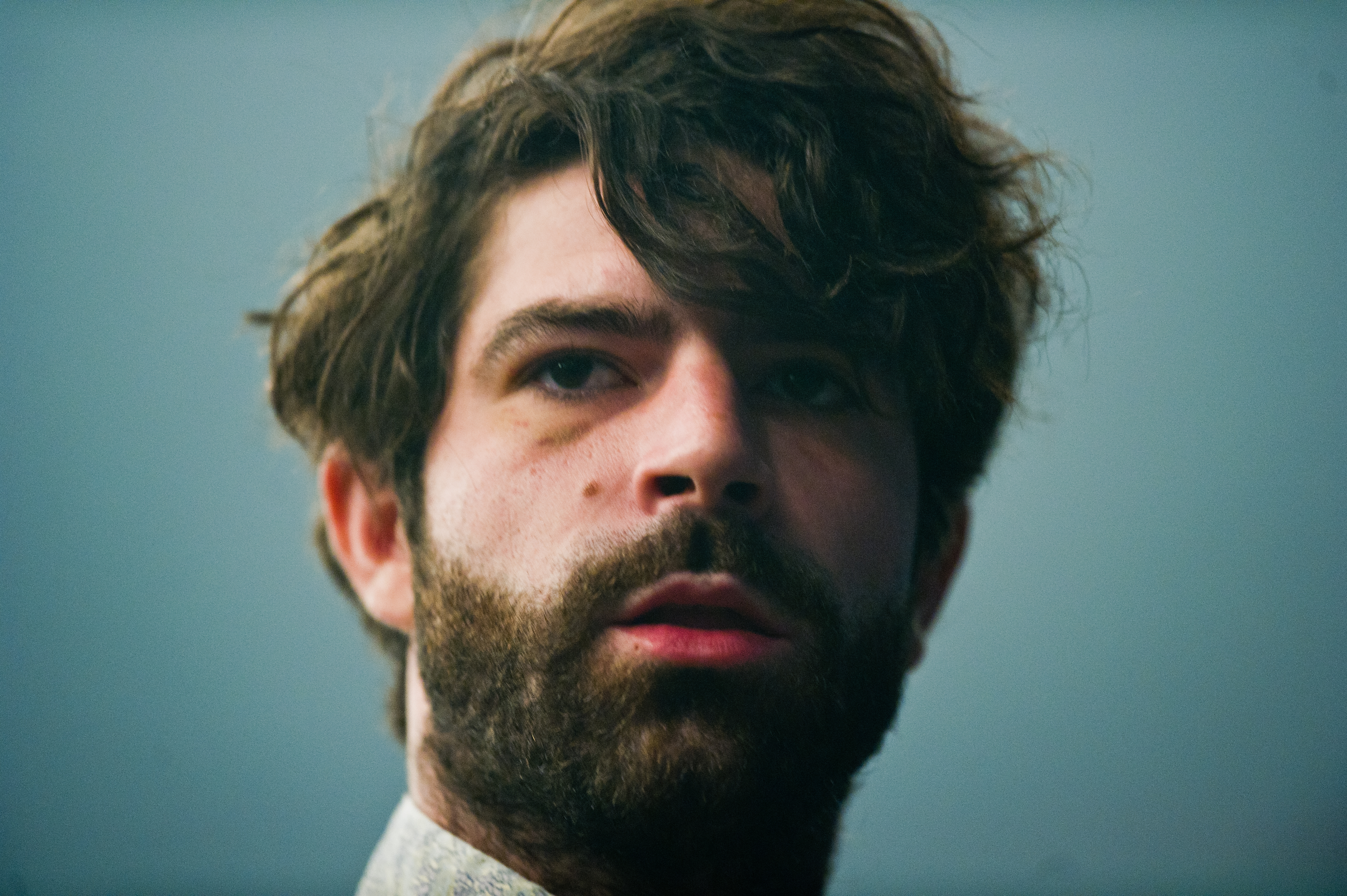
Yannis Philippakis, musician

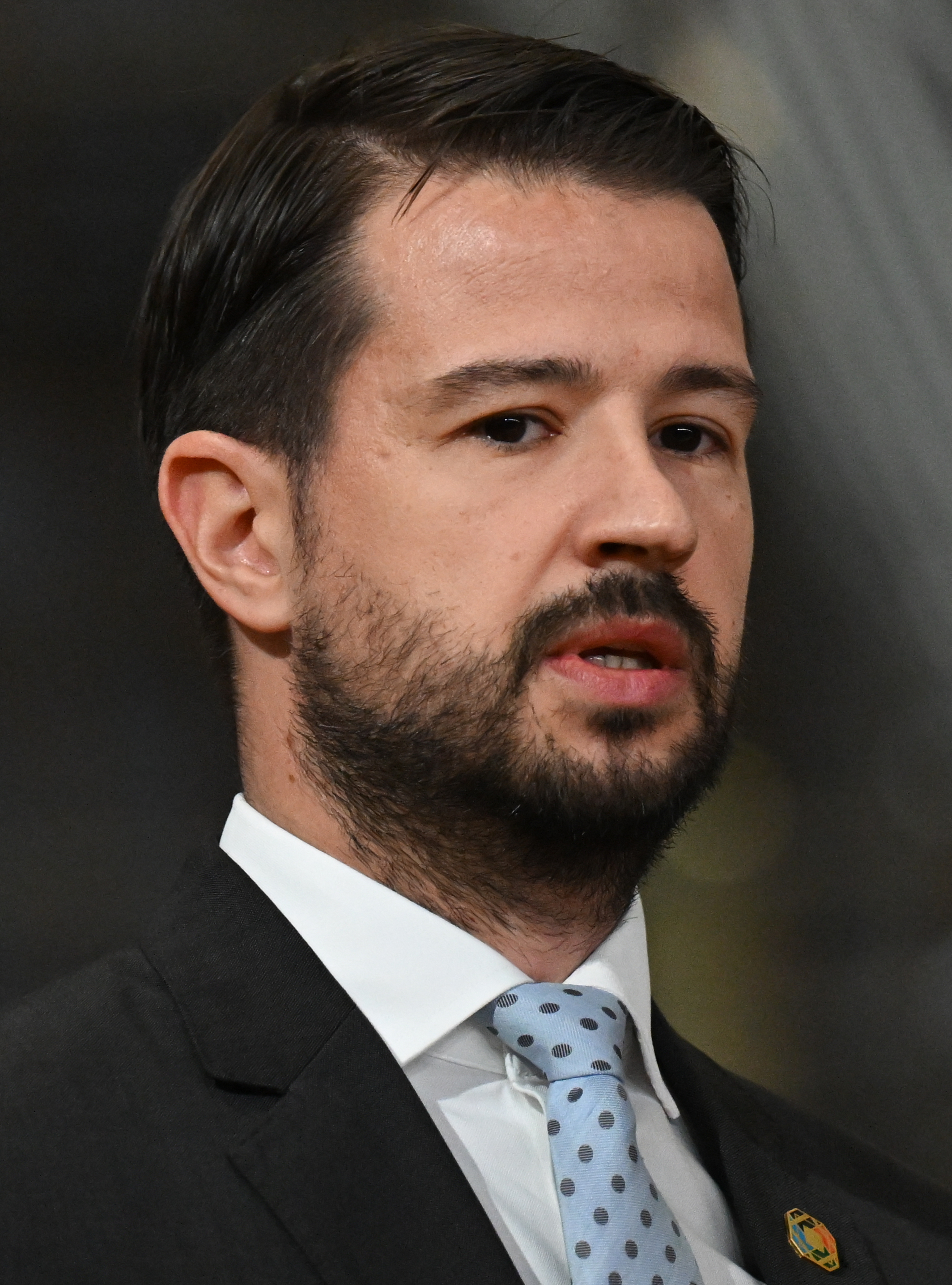
Jakov Milatović, 3rd President of Montenegro (2023–present)

=== Presidents ===
The college President is Professor Dame Sue Black, Baroness Black of Strome, a Scottish forensic anthropologist known for her work on identification in criminal convictions.

== See also ==
- Fellows of St John's College, Oxford
- List of alumni of St John's College, Oxford
