= Coalbiters =

British literary society (1926–1933)

The Coalbiters or Kolbítar were an informal literary society at Oxford University, formed by J.R.R. Tolkien, that ran from 1926 to 1933. The purpose of the group was to read the corpus of Old Norse-Icelandic literature in the original language. It is notable for being a precursor of the more famous literary group, the Inklings, and included several members of the latter group.

== History ==
Tolkien had specialised in Icelandic during his time at Oxford, and the literature of Old Norse-Icelandic was to become a major influence on his Middle Earth legendarium. While reader, and later professor in English Language at the University of Leeds from 1920 to 1925, he, along with his colleague E. V. Gordon, had formed a "Viking Club" along much the same principles as the Coalbiters would later follow, although the Viking Club was student-focused, while the Coalbiters were senior academics. In 1925, his old tutor, William Craigie, was invited to become Professor of English at the University of Chicago and his position as Rawlinson and Bosworth Professor of Anglo-Saxon at the University of Oxford became vacant. Tolkien applied for the position, highlighting his ability in Icelandic (amongst other ancient Germanic languages), a requirement for the post.

The Coalbiters was set up by Tolkien in the Hilary (Spring) term of 1926, following Tolkien's appointment. Its membership comprised academics of the university, largely members of the English faculty and related Humanities subjects, and it operated as an informal reading club for Old Norse literature, with the members translating the texts as they read. Meetings took place in pubs in Oxford, or in the home of one of the members, John Bryson. The name derives from the Old Norse kolbítar:

We have a little Icelandic Club in Oxford called the 'Kólbitar' [sic]; which means (literally) 'coal-biters', i.e. an Icelandic word for old cronies who sit around the fire so close that they look as if they were biting the coals. We have so far read the Younger Edda and the Volsung Saga: next term we shall read the Laxdale Saga.

— C.S. Lewis, Letter to Arthur Greaves 26 June 1927

The Coalbiters started with the Prose Edda, translating a few pages at a time, taking several years to complete the reading. They then tackled the Icelandic sagas, and finally the Poetic Edda. The reading of the Poetic Edda coincided with the early stages of Tolkien's development of The Hobbit. The names of Gandalf, the wizard, and the dwarves of Thorin Oakenshield's company are famously derived from Völuspá, the best known poem of the Poetic Edda.

Tolkien's friendship with C.S. Lewis was established largely as a result of their participation in this group. They started meeting regularly from around 1929, after Coalbiters meetings and on Monday mornings at the Eastgate Hotel, presaging what became meetings of the Inklings. The Inklings can be argued to have been a direct descendent of the Coalbiters, borrowing its name from a short-lived group led by undergraduate Edward Tangye Lean, of which Lewis and Tolkien were both members.

The Coalbiters was dissolved in 1933, with the group having worked through the available Old Norse literature, and its successor, The Inklings, possibly formed in the following Michaelmas (Autumn) term.

== Members ==
Members were all academics associated with the University of Oxford.

- J.R.R. Tolkien, Rawlinson and Bosworth Professor of Anglo-Saxon, Fellow of Pembroke College and future Inkling
- R.M. Dawkins, Professor of Byzantine and Modern Greek, Fellow of Exeter College
- C.T. Onions, Editor of the Oxford English Dictionary and fellow and librarian of Magdalen College
- G.E.K. Braunholtz, Professor of Comparative Philology and Fellow of Worcester College
- John Fraser, Jesus Professor of Celtic and fellow of Jesus College
- Nevill Coghill, Fellow of Exeter College and future Inkling
- John Bryson, Lecturer in English at Balliol, Merton and Oriel Colleges
- G.S. Gordon, Merton Professor of English Literature and later President of Magdalen College
- K.B. McFarlane, historian and Fellow of Magdalen College
- C.S. Lewis, Tutor in English Literature, Fellow of Magdalen College and future Inkling
