= Museum Lane =

Street in South Kensington, London

Coordinates: 51.4971°N 0.1743°W

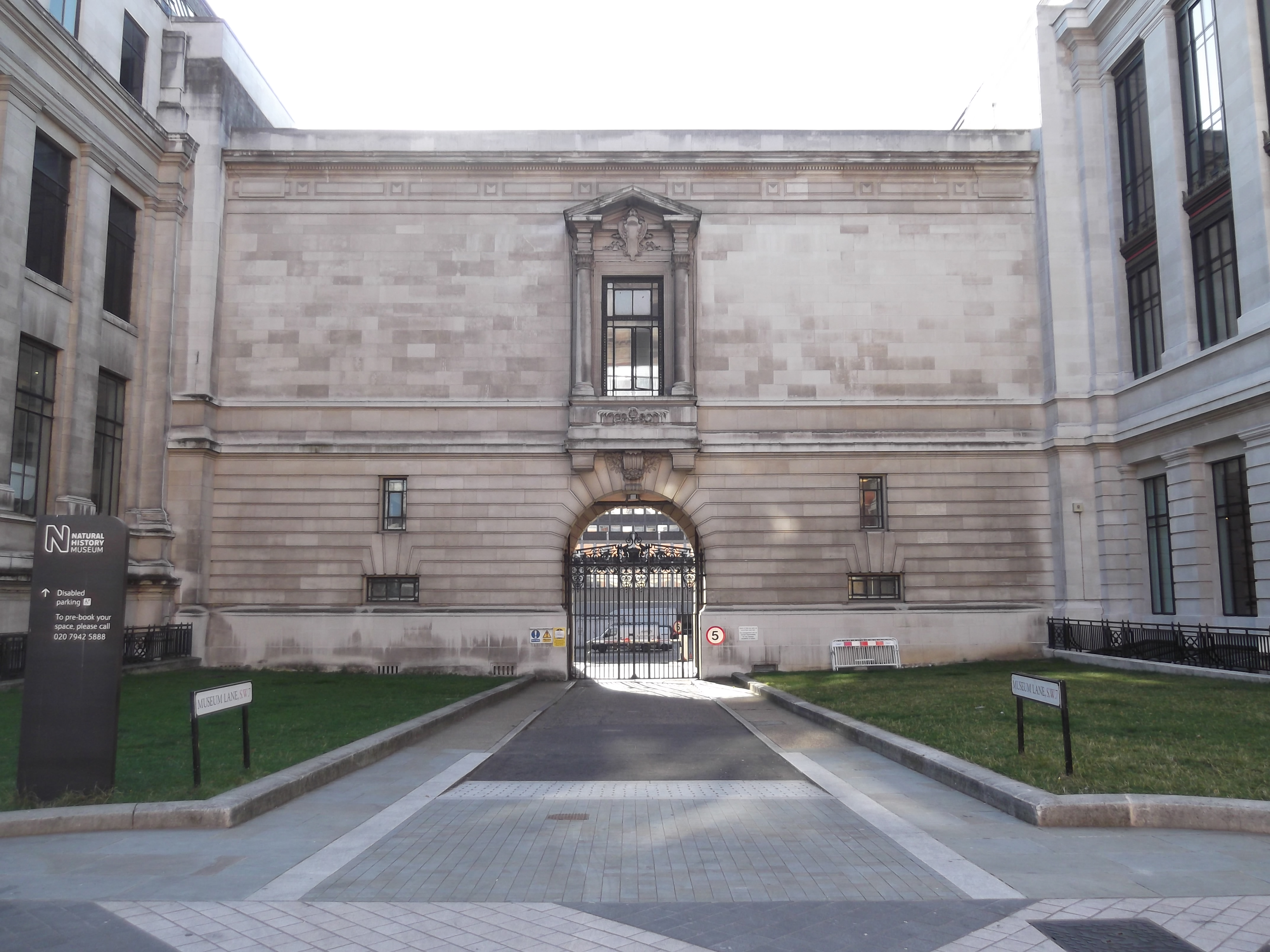
View west of Museum Lane from Exhibition Road. The Natural History Museum is on the left and the Science Museum is on the right, connected by a gateway. The lane continues through the gateway.

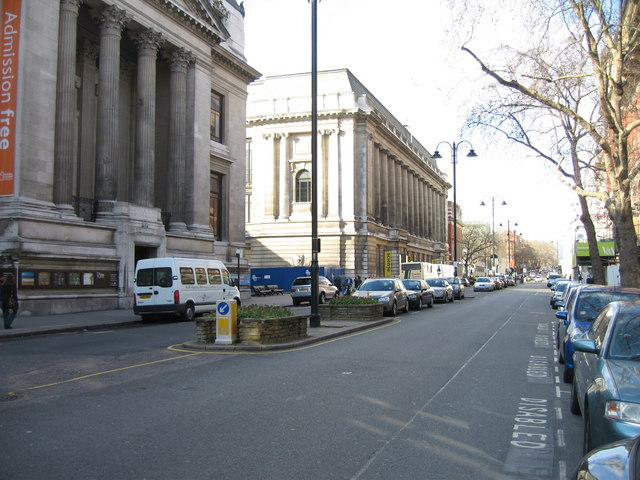
Looking north along Exhibition Road with the Natural History Museum and the Science Museum on the left. The junction with Museum Lane is between these two museums.

Museum Lane runs between two of London's leading museums in South Kensington, namely the Science Museum to the north and the Natural History Museum (formerly the Geological Museum) to the south. It runs to the west off Exhibition Road through a gateway connecting the two museums and connects with Queen's Gate. Opposite on Exhibition Road is the Henry Cole Wing of the Victoria and Albert Museum. The Dana Centre is just to the north at the Queen's Gate end.

The lane provided access to the "Exhibition of Science" at the Science Museum in 1951, part of the Festival of Britain. This included exhibits such as Ferranti's Nimrod, an early computer custom-built to play a computer game.

Museum Lane provides disabled access to the Natural History Museum. During the Exhibition Road Music Day there has been a Museum Lane stage as part of the festivities.

The postcode is London SW7 and the lane is within the Royal Borough of Kensington and Chelsea. The nearest London Underground station is South Kensington tube station to the south along Exhibition Road.

== See also ==
- Museum Road, Oxford
