= Lamb & Flag, Oxford =

Pub in Oxford

The Lamb & Flag
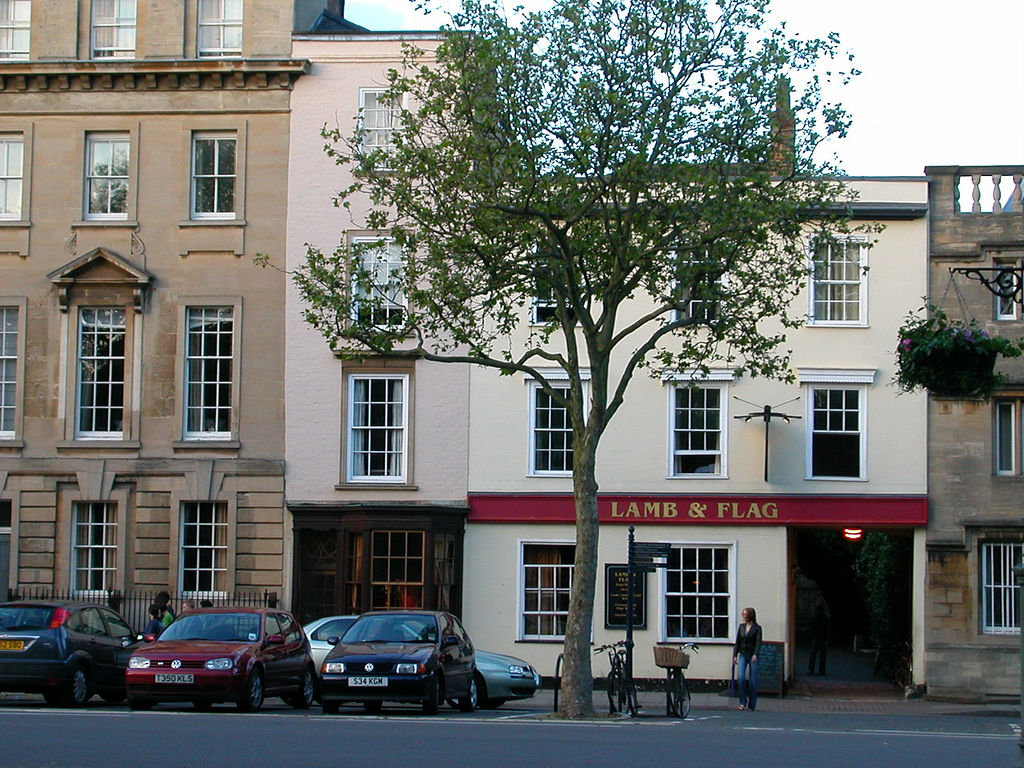
- Lamb & Flag pub

- Location within Oxford city centre

General information
- Location: 12 St Giles', Oxford, OX1 3JS
- Coordinates: 51°45′27″N 1°15′34″W
- Opened: 1613
- Owner: St John's College, Oxford

The Lamb & Flag is a pub on St Giles', Oxford, England. It is owned by St John's College, and lies just north of the main entrance to the college. Lamb & Flag Passage runs through the south side of the building, connecting St Giles' with Museum Road, where there is an entrance to Keble College to the rear of the pub.

The name of the pub comes from the symbol of Christ as the victorious Lamb of God (Agnus Dei) of the Book of Revelation, carrying a banner with a cross, and often gashed in the side. This is also a symbol of St John the Baptist, and so is emblematic of ownership by the College of St John the Baptist.

== History ==
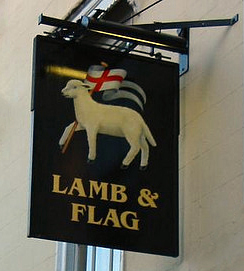
The Lamb & Flag Oxford pub sign

The Lamb had been operating since at least 1566, situated just south of St John's. In 1613 the college moved the pub to its current site (the old site is today the Dolphin Quadrangle). Though owned by the college, this new site was somewhat further away from the college's main buildings. Since the pub's move, construction of the Sir Thomas White and Kendrew Quadrangles in the twentieth and twenty-first centuries has led to the pub being once again close to St John's activities.

St John's took over the management of the pub in 1997, and used all pub profits to fund scholarships for graduate students. The pub is a Grade II listed building.

The Lamb & Flag had suffered a loss of revenues since the start of the COVID-19 pandemic, and closed on 31 January 2021. In September 2021, The Inklings, a community interest company, signed a 15-year lease to re-open it. The pub resumed service in October 2022.

== Popular culture ==
The pub may have inspired Thomas Hardy to write part of his novel Jude the Obscure. The novelist Graham Greene drank at the pub while a student at Balliol College, and it was mentioned in P.D. James' book The Children of Men. The pub featured frequently in episodes of the ITV detective drama Inspector Morse, and in the pilot episode of Endeavour.

In 1962, following modernisation of The Eagle and Child on the other side of St. Giles', the Inklings, a literary group associated with C. S. Lewis, started meeting at The Lamb and Flag. These meetings were soon abandoned after Lewis's death in 1963.
