= Inklings =

Informal literary discussion group associated with the University of Oxford, England

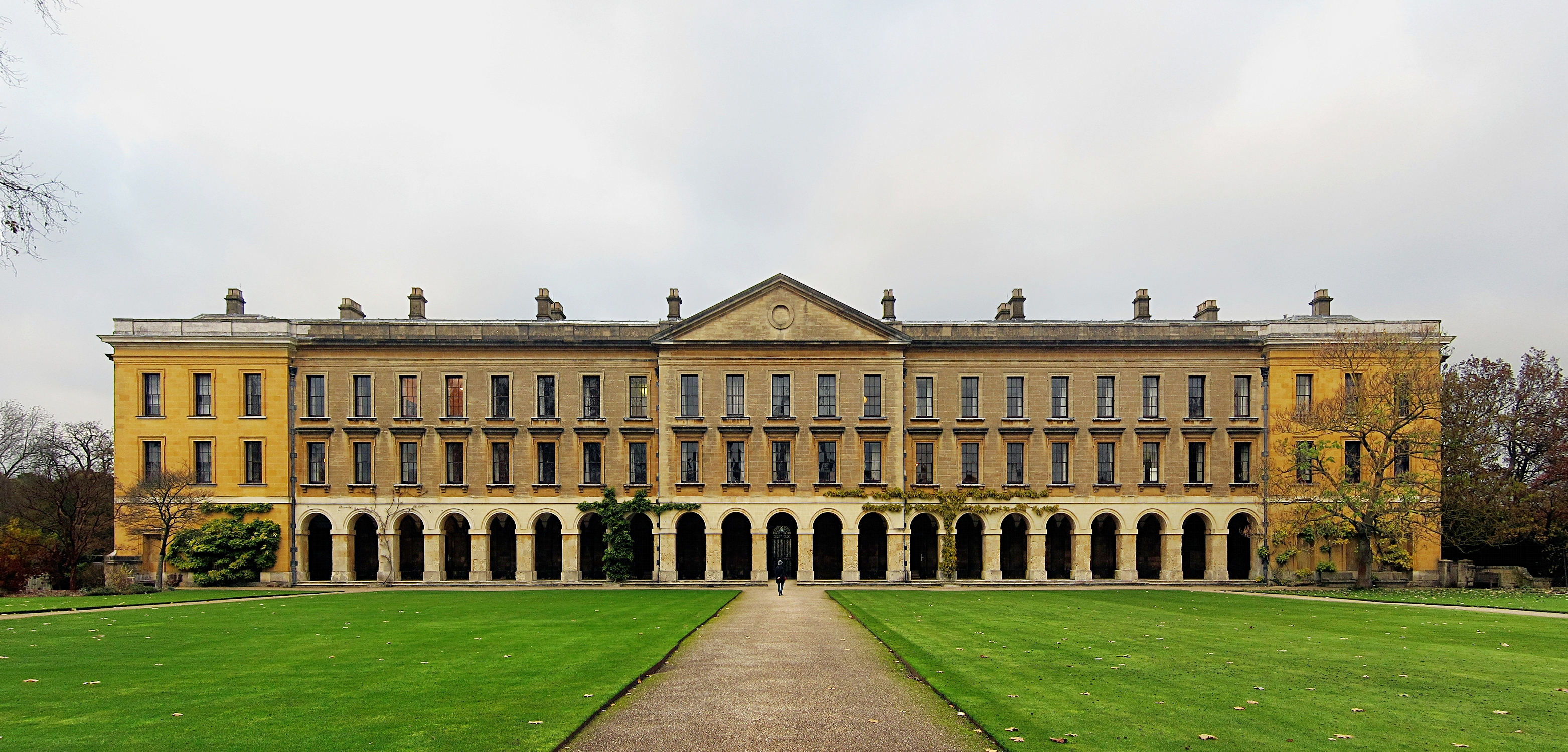
The New Building at Magdalen College. The Inklings met in C. S. Lewis's rooms, above the arcade on the right side of the central block.

The Inklings were an informal literary discussion group associated with C. S. Lewis and J. R. R. Tolkien at the University of Oxford. The Inklings were literary enthusiasts who praised the value of narrative in fiction and encouraged the writing of fantasy.

== Members ==
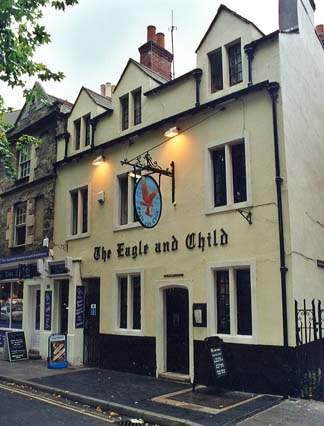
The Eagle and Child pub (commonly known as the Bird and Baby) in Oxford where the Inklings met informally on Tuesday mornings during term.

Members of the Inklings included:

- Owen Barfield
- Jack A. W. Bennett
- Lord David Cecil
- Nevill Coghill
- James Dundas-Grant
- Hugo Dyson
- Adam Fox
- Colin Hardie
- Robert Havard
- C. S. Lewis
- Warren Lewis (C. S. Lewis's elder brother)
- Gervase Mathew
- R. B. McCallum
- Courtenay Edward Stevens
- Christopher Tolkien (J. R. R. Tolkien's son)
- J. R. R. Tolkien
- John Wain
- Charles Williams
- Charles Leslie Wrenn

Guests included:

- Roy Campbell
- E. R. Eddison

== Meetings ==
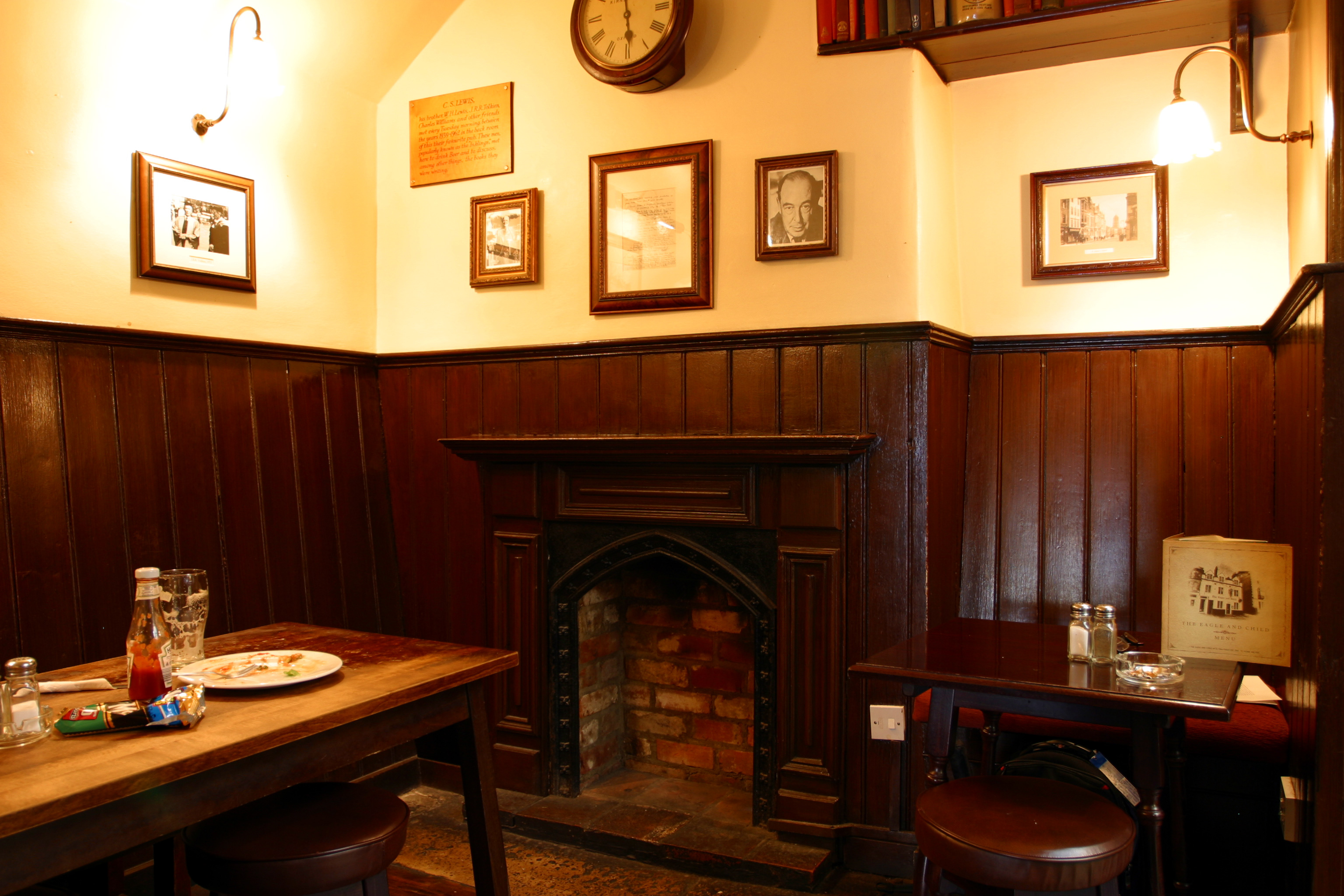
A corner of The Eagle and Child pub, formerly the landlord's sitting-room where Lewis's friends, including Inklings members, informally gathered on Tuesday mornings.

"Properly speaking," wrote Warren Lewis, "the Inklings was neither a club nor a literary society, though it partook of the nature of both. There were no rules, officers, agendas, or formal elections." As was typical for university groups in their time and place, the Inklings were all male. Readings and discussions of the members' unfinished works were the principal purposes of meetings. Tolkien's The Lord of the Rings, Lewis's Out of the Silent Planet, and Williams's All Hallows' Eve were among the novels first read to the Inklings. Tolkien's fictional Notion Club (see "Sauron Defeated") was based on the Inklings. Meetings were not all serious; the Inklings amused themselves by having competitions to see who could read the notoriously bad prose of Amanda McKittrick Ros for the longest without laughing.

The name was associated originally with a society of Oxford University's University College, initiated by the then undergraduate Edward Tangye Lean around 1931, for the purpose of reading aloud unfinished compositions. The society consisted of students and dons, among them Tolkien and Lewis. When Lean left Oxford in 1933, the society ended, and Tolkien and Lewis transferred its name to their own group. On the association between the two 'Inklings' societies, Tolkien later said "although our habit was to read aloud compositions of various kinds (and lengths!), this association and its habit would in fact have come into being at that time, whether the original short-lived club had ever existed or not."

The origin of the latter group is obscure, but it may have been as early as the Michaelmas (Autumn) term 1933, following the dissolution of The Coalbiters, the informal literary society formed by J. R. R. Tolkien to read Old Norse-Icelandic literature in the original language, and in which C. S. Lewis and Nevill Coghill were also members. The first documented meeting was March 26, 1934, and while it is assumed there were regular meetings from that point, the next documented meeting was either October 20 or 27, 1937, when C. S. Lewis invited Charles Williams to attend.

Inklings readings and discussions were usually held on Thursday evenings in C. S. Lewis's rooms at Magdalen College, although occasionally at J. R. R. Tolkien's rooms at Merton College. Members of the Inklings and other friends also gathered informally on Tuesdays at midday at a local public house, The Eagle and Child, familiarly and alliteratively known to the Inklings as The Bird and Baby. The publican, Charles Blagrove, let Lewis and friends use his private parlour, known as the "Rabbit Room", for privacy. During the war years, beer shortages occasionally rendered the Eagle and Child unable to open and the group instead met at other pubs, including the White Horse and the Kings Arms.

As with the origin of the group, its endpoint is difficult to pinpoint. The final meeting of the Inklings on Thursday Evenings is taken to have been on October 20, 1949, at Lewis's rooms at Magdalen. Meetings continued at lunchtime on Tuesdays at the Eagle and Child and were moved to Mondays in 1955 to accommodate Lewis's need to catch the afternoon train to Cambridge. At which point these meetings ceased to be properly regarded as "Inklings meetings" is debatable. C. S. Lewis wrote in a letter of 1959:

There is still a weekly meeting at the Bird and Baby: but whether you can call it the Old Group when there is a new landlord and Charles Williams is dead and Tolkien never comes is almost a metaphysical question [...]

The Eagle and Child was renovated in 1962, with the wall and door separating the Rabbit Room from the public bar being removed in 1962. Due to the loss of privacy, Lewis and his friends started meeting at The Lamb and Flag across the road. These meetings were soon abandoned after Lewis's death in 1963.

== Legacy ==
The Marion E. Wade Center, at Wheaton College, Illinois, has holdings on the Inklings Owen Barfield, C. S. Lewis, J. R. R. Tolkien and Charles Williams. These include letters, manuscripts, audio and video tapes, artwork, dissertations, periodicals, photographs, and related materials. It publishes the journal VII: Journal of the Marion E. Wade Center on Inklings topics. The Mythopoeic Society, with its journal Mythlore, is a literary organization devoted to the study of mythopoeic literature, particularly the works of J. R. R. Tolkien, C. S. Lewis, and Charles Williams; it was founded by Glen GoodKnight in 1967 and incorporated as a non-profit organization in 1971. A journal, published by Edinburgh University Press, that focuses specifically on the Inklings is Journal of Inklings Studies (founded in 2011).

== In fiction ==
Three of the best-known members of the Inklings – Tolkien, Lewis, and Williams – are the main characters of James A. Owen's fantasy series, The Chronicles of the Imaginarium Geographica, while Warren Lewis and Hugo Dyson are recurring minor characters throughout the series. The existence and founding of the organization are also alluded to in the third novel, The Indigo King.

== Sources ==
- Carpenter, Humphrey (1979). The Inklings: C. S. Lewis, J. R. R. Tolkien, Charles Williams and Their Friends. Houghton Mifflin. ISBN 0-395-27628-4.
- Carpenter, Humphrey, ed. (2023) [1981]. The Letters of J. R. R. Tolkien: Revised and Expanded Edition. New York: HarperCollins. ISBN 978-0-35-865298-4.
- Duriez, Colin (2015). The Oxford Inklings. Oxford: Lion Books. ISBN 9780745956343.
- Gilliver, Peter (2016). "The First Inkling: Edward Tangye Lean". Journal of Inklings Studies. 6: 65–77. doi:10.3366/ink.2016.6.2.3.
- Glyer, Diana Pavlac (2007). The Company They Keep: C. S. Lewis and J. R. R. Tolkien as Writers in Community. Kent State University Press. ISBN 978-0-87338-890-0.
- King, D. W. (2020). "When did the Inklings meet? A chronological survey of their gatherings: 1933–1954". Journal of Inklings Studies. 10 (2): 184–204. doi:10.3366/ink.2020.0079. S2CID 226364975.
- Lewis, Clive Staples (C. S.) (2004). The Collected Letters of C. S. Lewis, Volume 2: Narnia, Books, Broadcasts, and the War, 1931–1949. San Francisco: Harper Collins. ISBN 9780006281467.
- Lewis, Clive Staples (C. S.) (2007). The Collected Letters of C. S. Lewis, Volume 3: Narnia, Cambridge, and Joy, 1950–1963. San Francisco: Harper Collins. ISBN 9780060819224.
- Lewis, Warren Hamilton (1982). Kilby, Clyde S.; Mead, Marjorie Lamp (eds.). Brothers and Friends: The Diaries of Major Warren Hamilton Lewis. San Francisco: Harper & Row. ISBN 0-06-064575-X.
