= Museum (journal) =

- Discipline: Oriental art
- Language: Japanese

Publication details
- History: 1951-present
- Publisher: Bijutsu Shuppansha (Japan)
- Frequency: Bimonthly

Standard abbreviations
- ISO 4: Museum

Indexing
- ISSN: 0027-4003
- LCCN: 2007209616

Links
- Journal homepage; Online tables of content

Museum (ミューゼアム:国立博物館美術誌, Myūzeamu: Kokuritsu Hakubutsukan bijutsushi) is an academic journal covering research on Oriental art, museology, and conservation science, with a particular focus on Japanese art. It is published bimonthly in Japanese by the Tokyo National Museum, with some summaries in English.

== See also ==
- Cultural Properties of Japan
