= Gas Museum (Budapest) =

Museum in Budapest, Hungary

The Gas Museum (in Hungarian: Gázmúzeum), full name Fővárosi Gázművek Zrt. Gázmúzeum, was a Hungarian industrial history museum that operated between 1994 and 2012 in the area of the former Józsefvárosi Gázgyár (Budapest).

== History ==
The Gas Museum was founded in 1994. It was established at the Józsefváros site of Fővárosi Gázművek Rt., in the area of the former Józsefvárosi Gas Factory (Pápa János Pál II tér. 20), in a building erected in 1993. The size of the exhibition space was approximately 300 m2. In 1995, a permanent exhibition entitled "The beginning of the gas service of Budapest from 1856 to 1945" was opened. 2 years after the opening, in 1996, the collection was given the status of a specialist museum, and at that time the new exhibition entitled 140 years of gas supply in Budapest was completed. In 2006, the permanent exhibition was renewed.

In 2011, the director was dismissed, and in 2012, the exhibition space was closed. In 2015, the collection was also transported from there, to the Budapest XIV. to the warehouse under Angol utca 81 in the district.

== Publications ==
The museum published books. As part of this, the history of the Budapest gas works (Józsefvárosi Gázgyár, Ferencvárosi Gázgyár no. I, Ferencvárosi Gázgyár no. II, Újpest Gázgyár, Budai Gázgyár, Óbuda Gázgyár) was processed, a written description of the exhibition was prepared, and the Little Library of Landscapes-Age-Museums. The museum was also mentioned in a series in the following books and pamphlets:

- Dr. Gulyásné Gömöri Anikó: Budapest – Gázmúzeum, TKM Egyesület, Budapest, 1998 (Tájak–Korok–Múzeumok Kiskönyvtára-sorozat 593. kötet)
- Dr. Gulyásné Gömöri Anikó – Dr. Balogh András – Vadas Ferenc: Az első gázgyár, Fővárosi Gázművek Zrt., Budapest, 1999, ISBN 963-03-7891-4
- Dr. Gulyásné Gömöri Anikó – Dr. Balogh András – Vadas Ferenc: Fiókgázgyárak Budapesten, Fővárosi Gázművek Rt., Budapest, 2001, ISBN 963007236
- Dr. Gulyásné Gömöri Anikó – Dr. Balogh András – Vadas Ferenc: Az óbudai gázgyár, Fővárosi Gázművek Zrt., Budapest, 2004, ISBN 963-217-207-8
- Dr. Gulyásné Gömöri Anikó – Dr. Balogh András – Vadas Ferenc: A fővárosi gázszolgáltatás 150 éve, Fővárosi Gázművek Zrt., Budapest, 2006, ISBN 963-06-1114-7
- Dr. Gulyásné Gömöri Anikó: Gázmúzeum kiállításának ismertetője, h. n., é. n. (angol nyelven is megjelent)

Publications were also prepared about the temporary exhibitions.

== Sources ==
- Dr. Gulyásné Gömöri Anikó: A Gázmúzeum kiállításának megszüntetése (real-eod.mtak.hu)
- Gázmúzeum – Budapest (museum.hu)
- NEKTAR.OSZK adatbázis
- antikvarium.hu adatbázis
- (főszerk.) Balassa M. Iván: Magyarország múzeumai. Múzeumlátogatók kézikönyve, Vince Kiadó Kft., Budapest, 2001, ISBN 978-963-9192-93-5
