= Hugo Dyson =

English academic and writer (1896–1975)

- Dyson in 1964/5 (in a still from the film Darling)
- Born: 7 April 1896; Hove, Brighton and Hove, East Sussex, England
- Died: 6 June 1975 (aged 79)
- Occupation: Scholar
- Writing career
- Genre: Shakespearian Literature

Henry Victor Dyson Dyson (7 April 1896 – 6 June 1975), generally known as Hugo Dyson and who signed his writings H. V. D. Dyson, was an English academic and a member of the Inklings literary group. He was a committed Christian, and together with J. R. R. Tolkien he helped C. S. Lewis to convert to Christianity, particularly after a long conversation as they strolled on Addison's Walk at Oxford.

== Career ==
=== Academia ===
Dyson taught English at the University of Reading from 1924 until obtaining a fellowship with Merton College, Oxford, in 1945. His students at Oxford included the later cultural theorist Stuart Hall, whom he tutored in the early 1950s. Dyson retired in 1963 but returned as emeritus fellow in 1969, teaching the newly introduced "modern" literature paper. His tutorials were notable because many of the writers he discussed had been personal friends.

=== Works ===
Dyson was not a prolific writer, but the quality and voluminous quantity of his lectures and general conversation had quite an effect on people. He wrote the introduction of his first published book Poetry and Prose (1933), which is a collection of works of Alexander Pope with notes by Dyson. Another of his few publications is Augustans and Romantics, 1689–1830 (1940), a survey of contemporary English literature with a bibliography by Professor John Butt.

Dyson preferred talk at Inklings meetings to readings. He had a distaste for J. R. R. Tolkien's The Lord of the Rings and complained loudly at its readings. Christopher Tolkien recounted a meeting when Tolkien was reading and Dyson was "lying on the couch, and lolling and shouting and saying, 'Oh God, no more Elves'" Eventually Tolkien gave up reading to the group altogether.

=== Television and film ===
Dyson, an expert on Shakespeare, was asked during the early 1960s to host some televised lectures and plays about the writer. Dyson's relaxed style resulted in him being cast in a small part in the 1965 film Darling as Professor Walter Southgate, a major literary character.

== Personal life ==
Hugo Dyson lived at 32 Sandfield Road in the east Oxford suburb of Headington until his death. He married Margaret Mary Bosworth in 1925. He is buried in Holywell Cemetery, Oxford.

== Filmography ==
Year	Title	Role	Notes
1965	Darling	Walter Southgate	Uncredited
