= Agnes Cotton =

English social reformer and philanthropist

- Born: 27 February 1828; Leytonstone, England
- Died: 20 May 1899 (aged 71); Leytonstone, England
- Occupations: Social reformer Philanthropist
- Known for: Reform home (The Pastures)
- Parents: William Cotton (father); Sarah Cotton (mother)
- Relatives: Henry Cotton (brother); Sarah Acland (sister); William Cotton (brother)

Agnes Cotton (27 February 1828 – 20 May 1899) was an English social reformer and philanthropist. She founded and ran a home in Leytonstone for 'fallen girls' called The Pastures.

== Early life ==
Cotton was born in Leytonstone to the banker William and Sarah Cotton. Her siblings included the judge Henry Cotton, the philanthropist Sarah Acland, and the missionary William Cotton.

Cotton was educated by her mother until she was 14, when she was sent to boarding school.

Cotton fell ill at age 14, and after her recovery devoted herself to God. Letters written by her during the 1840s show that she followed the Oxford Movement.

== Life ==
Cotton was considered to be a philanthropist by the time she was 18. She helped her sister Sarah Acland in her philanthropy projects and started to create her own projects to care for children in Leytonstone.

Cotton often dressed in black and wore a veil, so the residents of Leytonstone thought her to be a nun. She was known to the locals as 'Sister Agnes'.

== The Pastures ==
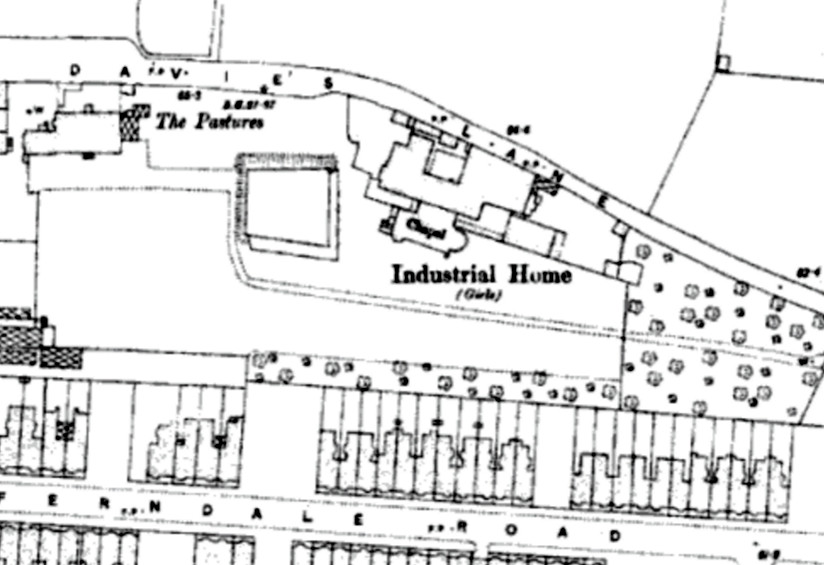
1895 map showing the location of The Pastures (top left).

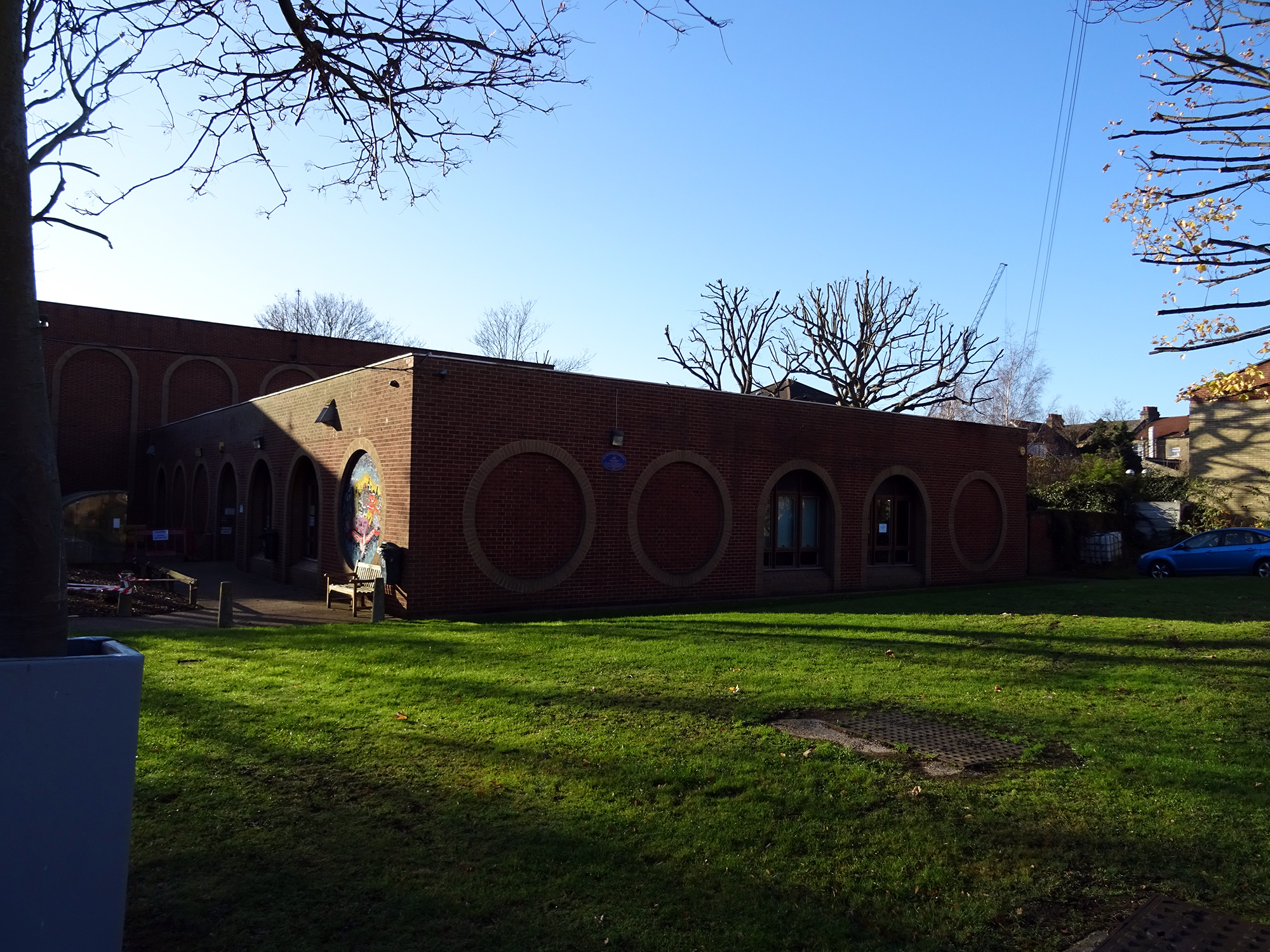
The site of The Pastures today.

In 1865, Cotton opened a children's home with an attached laundry for girls. This was expanded when she moved to The Cedars, a home once operated as an orphanage/school by the Methodist preacher Mary Bosanquet. She renamed the house 'The Pastures'.

In about 1880, Cotton paid for an expansion of the existing building. The site in Leytonstone now included a chapel, industrial laundry, school and was known as the 'Home of the Good Shepherd' to differentiate it from 'The Pastures,' which was the former base. Previously Cotton's good works had been funded by herself, her family, and well wishers; in the 1880s the home attracted funding from the state. It was registered under the Criminal Law Amendment Act, although it was not a home for delinquent girls but a place of training in laundry work for girls who had been involved in prostitution.

Rumours about harsh treatment inside of The Pastures began to spread in 1894. Rumours varied from stories about the girls being unsupervised, to abused, to stories about Cotton being too old for the job. The Home Office was called into investigate after Reverend A. Drew, a chairman of the London School Board, demanded an inquiry. Inspector William Inglis concluded that the rumours were false, and exonerated Cotton. Despite her exoneration, the London School Board cut ties with Cotton in 1895.

== Death and legacy ==
Cotton died in Leytonstone on 20 May 1899 at The Pastures, and was buried with her family in St John's churchyard on 24 May. Cotton left monies for women who had assisted her, including Elizabeth Amelia Bragg, and her ward, Mary Agnes Hope.

Cotton's home continued to operate until the Second World War under the management of the Community of St John Baptist, Clewer. In 1940 the home was evacuated to Northampton, and after the war it was never reopened.
