= Isle of Wight Rly Co v Tahourdin =

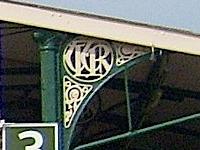
- Court: Court of Appeal
- Decided: 1883 Dec. 17
- Citation: (1884) LR 25 Ch D 320

Court membership
- Judges sitting: Cotton LJ, Lindley LJ, Fry LJ

Keywords
- Director removal, meetings, construction

Isle of Wight Railway Company v Tahourdin (1884) LR 25 Ch D 320 is a UK company law case on removing directors under the old Companies Clauses Act 1845. In the modern Companies Act 2006, section 168 allows shareholders to remove of directors by a majority vote on reasonable notice, regardless of what the company constitution says. Before 1945, removal of directors depended on the constitution, however this case contains some useful guidance on how properly to construe the provisions of a constitution.

== Facts ==
The shareholders of the Isle of Wight Railway Co instructed the board of directors to call a meeting so they could (1) appoint a meeting to investigate and potentially rearrange the company's management, and also (2) decide whether to remove the present directors and elect new ones. The directors called a meeting “for the purpose of considering and determining upon a demand of the requisitionists for the appointment of a committee to inquire into the working and general management of the company and the means of reducing the working expenses.” But they did not allow the meeting to concern whether they would be dismissed. Disgruntled shareholders, including Mr Graham Tahourdin, boycotted the meeting, and issued their own notice to call a meeting to remove the directors under the Companies Clauses Act 1845, section 70. The directors brought the action to restrain the meeting.

== Judgment ==
=== High Court ===
Kay J held that the first part of the original meeting request was illegal where it went beyond merely appointing a committee, because that could result in transferring power away from the directors that was properly fixed under the constitution. The second part was too vague, did not "fully express the object of the meeting" and the directors had no power to call such a meeting, and so the shareholders' power under CCA 1845 s 70 had not arisen. Therefore, he granted the injunction. Mr Tahourdin appealed.

=== Court of Appeal ===
The Court of Appeal unanimously overturned Kay J's decision and held that the meeting could be called because the notice about voting on removal of "any of the directors" was clear enough, and the Companies Clauses Act 1845 section 91 gave the general meeting power to remove directors. The general meeting can always fill up board vacancies if all directors are removed and the directors do not exercise their power under section 89, and so the directors were bound to send out the notice of the shareholders' proposal. Moreover, the first part of the shareholders' proposal was not illegal, because activities beyond merely appointing a committee could be done in a way that was not ultra vires.

Cotton LJ's opinion, on the issues of when how a meeting should be called and director removal,

It is a very strong thing indeed to prevent shareholders from holding a meeting of the company, when such a meeting is the only way in which they can interfere, if the majority of them think that the course taken by the directors, in a matter which is intrà vires of the directors, is not for the benefit of the company...

Now sect. 70 requires that the requisition shall fully express the object of the meeting required to be called, and when the meeting is called, then, under sect. 69, the meeting cannot enter upon “any business not set forth in the notice upon which it shall have been convened.” Therefore the meeting if it had met on the notice issued by the directors, could not have considered the question of removing any of the directors; and, in my opinion, its powers would have been limited as regards the first requisition, because assuming that everything upon which the committee were intended to enter is included in the working and general management of the company, yet as the purpose stated in the notice was limited to the appointment of a committee, it would have been said at once that neither that meeting nor any adjournment of it could require the directors to carry out the recommendations of the committee. The ground on which the directors so limited their notice was (and that seems to have been adopted, so far as the first object goes, by the learned Judge) that everything proposed by the requisition beyond the appointment of a committee was illegal, and that therefore they were justified in not calling a meeting for the purpose of considering it. Now I am of opinion that if the object for which it is proposed to call a meeting is one which can be carried out in a legal way, then, although the notice may be so expressed that resolutions following its precise terms would be illegal, it is not right for the directors to limit the notice so as to prevent the meeting from entering into the question simply because the terms of the notice would justify a resolution which would be ultrà vires . Directors have great powers, and the Court refuses to interfere with their management of the company's affairs if they keep within their powers, and if a shareholder complains of the conduct of the directors while they keep within their powers, the Court says to him, “If you want to alter the management of the affairs of the company go to a general meeting, and if they agree with you they will pass a resolution obliging the directors to alter their course of proceeding.”...

Then there is a second object, “To remove (if deemed necessary or expedient) any of the present directors, and to elect directors to fill any vacancy in the board.” The learned Judge below thought that too indefinite, but in my opinion a notice to remove “any of the present directors” would justify a resolution for removing all who are directors at the present time; “any” would involve “all.” I think that a notice in that form is quite sufficient for all practical purposes. If when the recommendations of the committee were known, or when the committee had been appointed, the directors or some of them were to say, “We will not act any longer if you insist upon this. We will not follow out the recommendations whatever they may be,” then very likely the general meeting would say, “If that be so we do not wish to have you as directors any longer, and we will remove you.” That shews why the words “any of” were put in. If the committee make recommendations which are accepted by the company, some of the directors, though disapproving of them, may say, “We think this unadvisable, but as the company wishes it we submit to their wishes,” and then very likely the meeting will say, “We will not remove those gentlemen, but we will remove those who at the meeting refuse to take the course which we consider conducive to the interests of the company.” I am of opinion that under sect. 91 a general meeting of shareholders has power to remove directors, and that the notice was sufficiently distinct, and if so, the notice issued by the directors was insufficient in this respect also...

Lindley LJ then delivered his judgment, concurring.

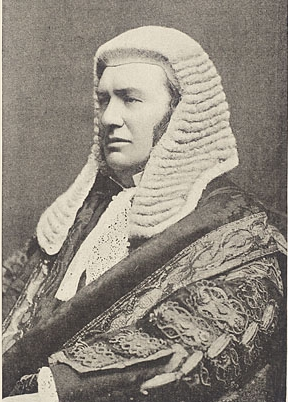
Lord Justice Lindley.

I am of the same opinion. It appears to me that this case is very much more important than at first sight appears. It raises a question of the utmost possible consequence as to the management of railway and other companies. We must bear in mind the decisions in Foss v Harbottle and the line of cases following it, in which this Court has constantly and consistently refused to interfere on behalf of shareholders, until they have done the best they can to set right the matters of which they complain, by calling general meetings. Bearing in mind that line of decisions, what would be the position of the shareholders if there were to be another line of decisions prohibiting meetings of the shareholders to consider their own affairs? It appears to me that it must be a very strong case indeed which would justify this Court in restraining a meeting of shareholders. I do not mean to say of course that there could not be a case in which it would be necessary and proper to exercise such a power. I can conceive a case in which a meeting might be called under such a notice that nothing legal could be done under it. Possibly in that case an injunction to restrain the meeting might be granted. I do not say that it would, that case may be dealt with when it arises. In the present case it must be observed that the notice is not a notice of particular resolutions—it is a notice stating objects which the requisitionists wish to accomplish by any legal means. That is the only notice which they need give according to the terms of the Act of Parliament. One of their objects is to remove the directors. In my opinion, when we look at sect. 91 of the Companies Clauses Act, there can be no doubt that a general meeting has power to do this. The directors have issued a notice calling a meeting, but have excluded from their notice that object amongst others. That cannot be right. The other object of the requisitionists is to see whether they cannot economise by concentrating the offices and reducing their staff of officials. I quite agree that this notice is not happily worded, because it is capable of being construed so as to lead to the inference that they wanted to do this by delegating the powers of the company to a committee, the legality of which may be fairly questioned. But assuming that to be the true construction, it does not at all follow that under a notice of this kind a meeting would be precluded from passing resolutions substantially effecting the objects of the requisitionists in a way open to no objection on the score of illegality. It seems to me a very strong thing to say that the meeting shall not be held, because the notice is so wide that, according to its terms, illegal resolutions might be passed. I am of opinion that this injunction ought not to have been granted.

Fry LJ gave a concurring opinion.

== See also ==
- UK company law
- AG of Belize v Belize Telecom Ltd
- Imperial Hydropathic Hotel Co, Blackpool v Hampson (1882) 23 Ch D 1
- Andrews v Gas Meter Company (1884) LR 25 Ch D 320
