= St John the Baptist's Church, Leytonstone =

Coordinates: 51°34′7.5″N 0°0′39.4″E

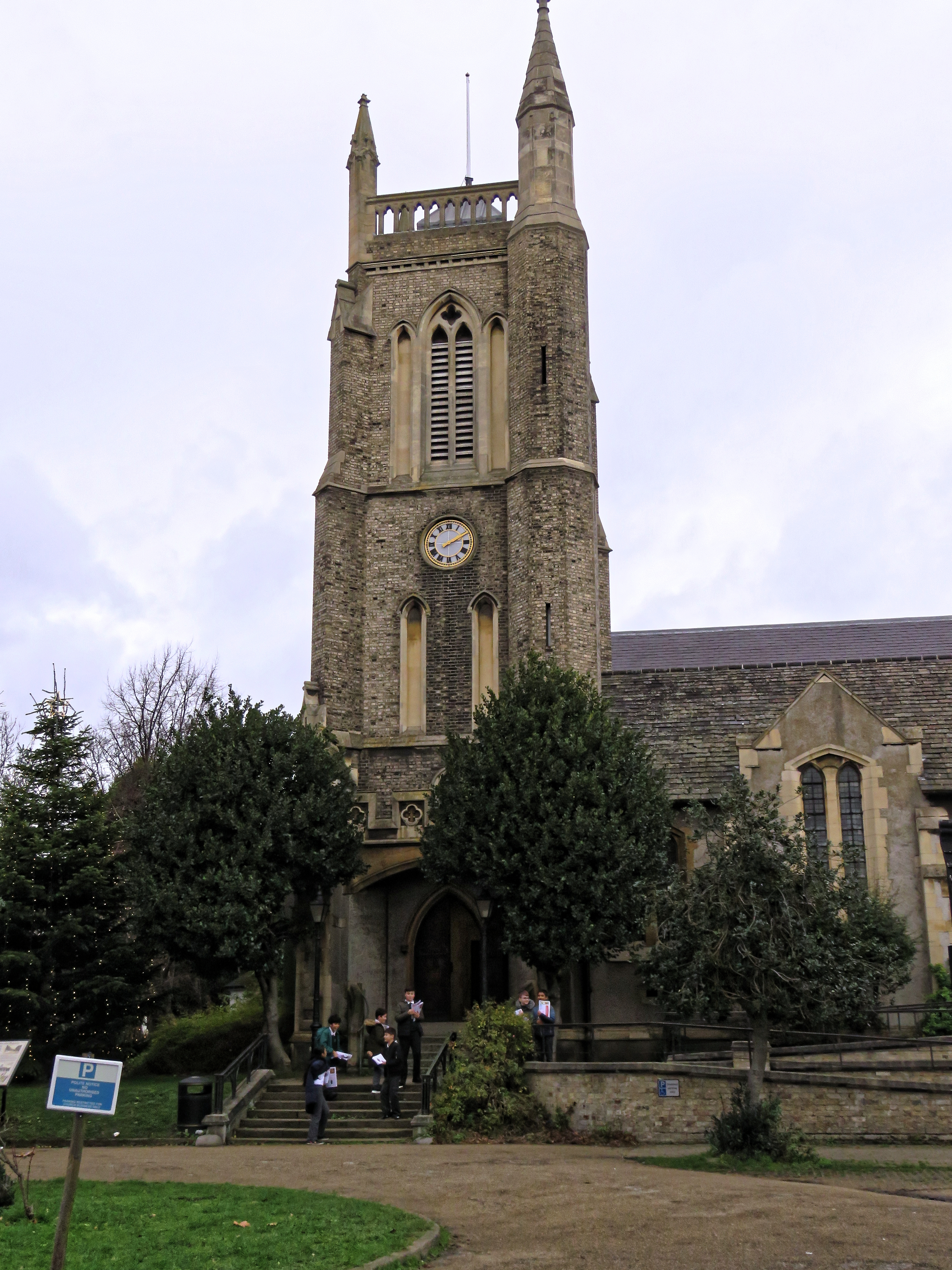
- View of south elevation of St John's Church
- St John the Baptist's Church, Leytonstone
- Location: High Road, Leytonstone, London, E11 1HH
- Country: England
- Denomination: Church of England
- Website: http://www.stjohns-leytonstone.org.uk/

History
- Status: Active
- Dedication: John the Baptist

Architecture
- Functional status: Parish church
- Heritage designation: Grade II listed
- Designated: 24 February 1987
- Years built: 1658-1932

Administration
- Diocese: Chelmsford
- Archdeaconry: West Ham

Clergy
- Vicar: David Britton

The Church of St John the Baptist, Leytonstone, is a 19th-century Church of England parish church in Leytonstone, East London, occupying a prominent position in the High Road. It is a Grade II listed building.

== History ==
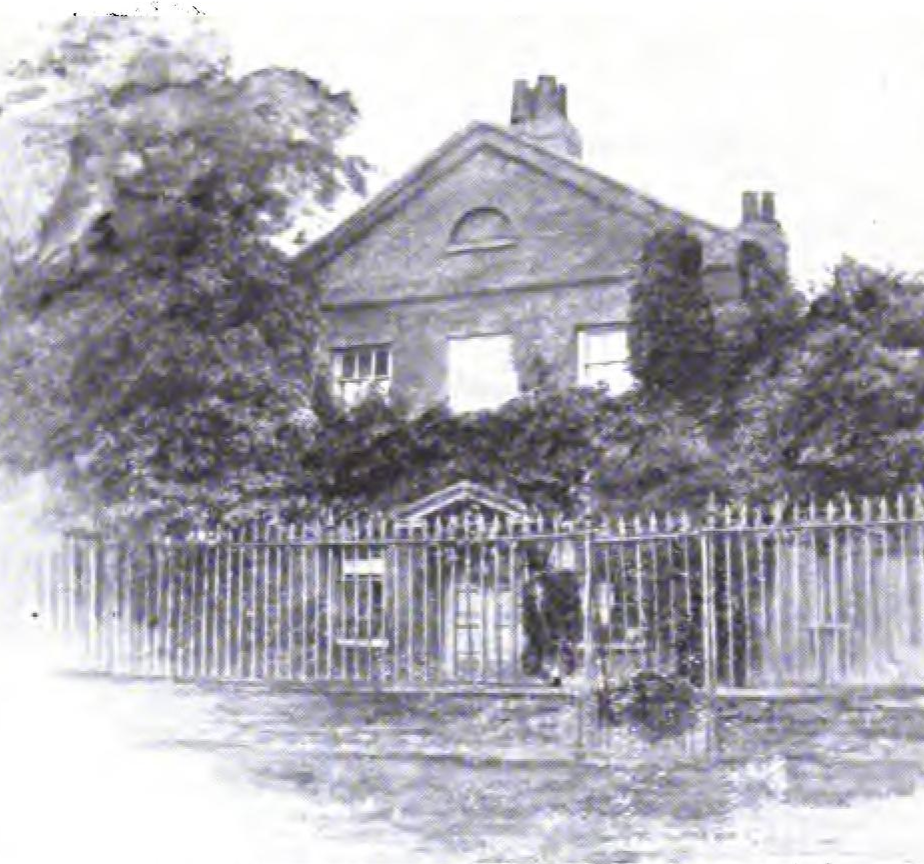
The Chapel of Ease at Leytonstone, built in 1749 and rebuilt in 1819. Later used as the Leytonstone National School until 1876, it was finally demolished in 1938.

=== Chapel of ease ===
Leytonstone originally formed a part of the ancient parish of Leyton, for which the only Anglican place of worship was Leyton Parish Church. In 1748, some wealthy residents proposed that a chapel of ease should be built in Leytonstone, then a rural but prosperous village; one of them complained that "the inhabitants in general find it very inconvenient, and many utterly impossible, for them to resort thither [to Leyton] at least so frequently as they ought for ye public worship of God". Despite the opposition of the lord of the manor, David Gansel of Leyton Grange, and the ambivalence the vicar of Leyton, a plot of land was leased on the west side of Leytonstone High Road and a small chapel was built on it, funded by residents including the poet David Lewis and the banker Samuel Bosanquet. The chapel opened in 1749, but was closed soon afterwards when Gansel took legal action to prevent its use, until 1754 when a minister was appointed by the Bishop of London with a stipend provided by pew rents. In 1819 the chapel was enlarged, but because it was built on leasehold estate, it could not be consecrated, although the bishop agreed that it could be licensed for the administration of sacraments. The enlarged chapel, which stood opposite where Barclay Road now joins the High Road, was able to seat 580, with 240 seats being rent free for those unable to pay.

Following the chapel's redundancy as a place of worship, the building was for used by the Leytonstone National Schools, which had previously been housed in buildings in the chapel grounds. The schools moved to purpose built premises in Kirkdale Road in 1876 and the chapel was used thereafter as assembly rooms until its demolition in 1938.

=== New church and parish ===
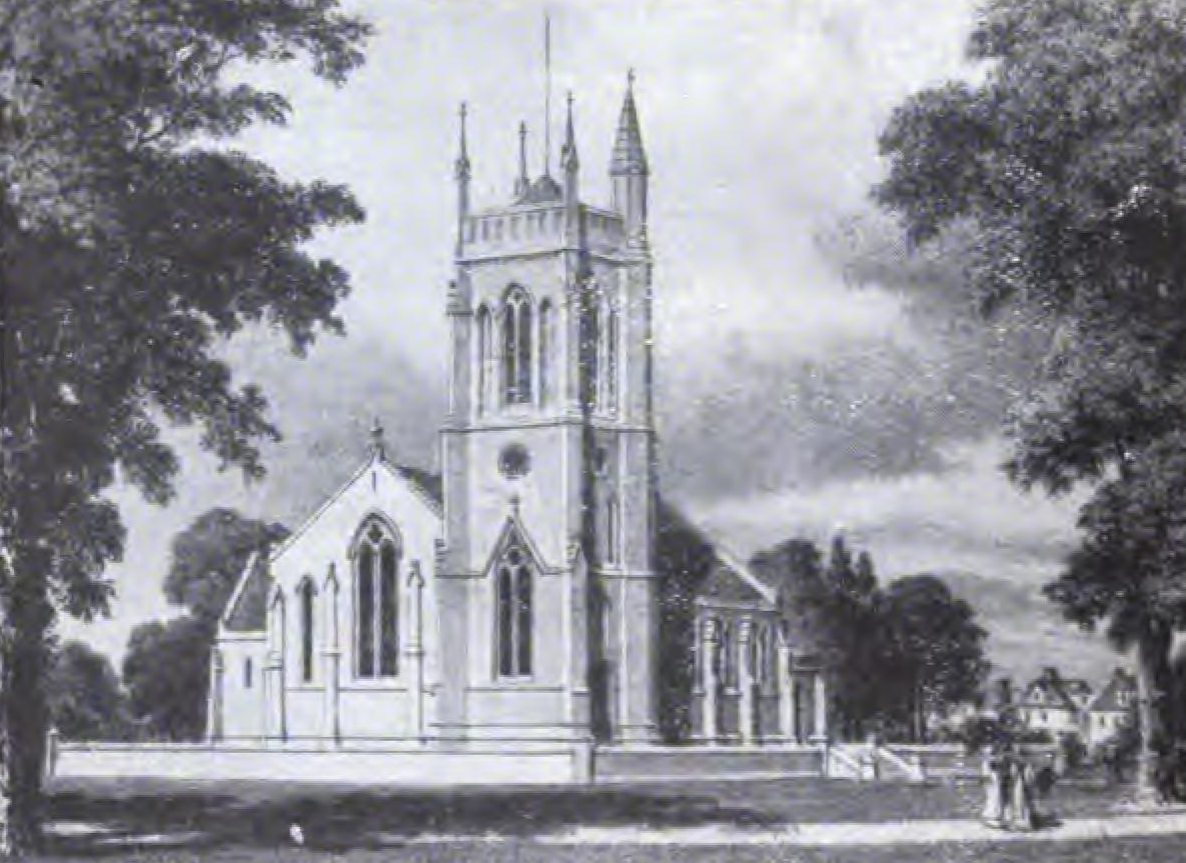
A print depicting the Church of St John the Baptist as it appeared in 1833.

In July 1830, the vicar of Leyton preached a sermon in which he pointed out the deficiencies of the chapel at Leytonstone which included "the insecure and decaying condition of the edifice, the want of devotional character in its appearance, and the inadequate accommodation which it offers to the labouring classes". On 1 August, a committee was formed to raise money for a new church by subscription, £1,000 having already been contributed by an elderly parishioner, probably the mariner and merchant Joseph Cotton. In December, the architect Edward Blore was engaged to draw up plans for a new church and in February 1831, the firm of Curtiss, Dean & Crow were invited to tender for the construction work. Meanwhile, a large plot of land further north along the High Road was purchased at the expense of William Cotton of Wallwood House, a successful merchant and the son of Joseph Cotton, which after much legal negotiation was transferred to the Church Commissioners on 16 June 1832.

The first stone of the new church was laid on 20 July 1832 by the vicar of Leyton. The design was in the Early English Gothic style, using yellow brick with stone dressing. The building originally consisted of a small sanctuary, a nave, and a pinnacled, three stage bell tower at the western end. There was seating for about 600 people, initially in box pews. The church was consecrated on 31 October 1833 by the Bishop of London, Charles James Blomfield. The churchyard was enclosed by brick walls and iron railings at the end of that year. A ring of bells was cast at the Whitechapel Bell Foundry and donated by William Davis of The Pastures; all six are named after female members of the Davis and Cotton families. The creation of a separate ecclesiastical parish for the church was announced in the London Gazette on 11 February 1845, Reverend Hebert Evans being the first vicar.

The third vicar, Horace Waller, a prominent abolitionist, was appointed to St John's in 1870. He was friends with a number of missionaries to Africa, including David Livingstone. Some sources suggest that Livingstone visited Waller in Leytonstone, however Livingstone had left the United Kingdom for the last time in August 1865. Following Livingstone's death in 1873, Abdullah Susi and James Chuma, Livingstone's African companions, visited England and were invited by Waller to stay at the vicarage in Leytonstone (now the site of a Matalan store), and there they helped Waller to edit and annotate Livingstone's journals which were published late in 1874, shortly after Waller had moved to a new parish in Twywell, Northamptonshire. In the vicarage back garden, Susi and Chuma built a replica of the African hut in which Livingstone had died; a photograph of it survives at the School of Oriental and African Studies.

=== Additions and enlargements ===
The arrival of the railway at Leytonstone in 1856 caused social change in the district as the wealthy families sold their estates for streets of terraced houses, which in turn brought about a large increase in the population in the following decades. To cater for the increase in worshipers, a number of daughter churches were established in Leytonstone; Holy Trinity, Harrow Green in 1874, St Andrew, Forest Glade in 1882, St Margaret of Antioch, Woodhouse Road in 1884, St Catherine, Hainault Road in 1885 and St Columba, Ravenstone Road in 1888. Plans to enlarge St John the Baptist were finalised in 1890, but approval and funding were not in place until April 1893 when work commenced. The new additions included a chancel which could accommodate the choir, a choir vestry and a new seating arrangement allowing 140 new places. The architect for the work was the firm of Adams & Mann. A new pipe organ of three manuals and 34 stops was installed, built by Brindley & Foster of Sheffield. This replaced a barrel organ which could play a total of 66 hymn tunes and was operated by a local gardener, who was in the habit of cranking it faster than the congregation could sing. Also added at that time was a stone pulpit, originally designed by Sir Arthur Blomfield for St James's Church in Belgravia where it was found to be unsuitable. The additions were consecrated by the Bishop of Colchester, Dr Alfred Blomfield, on 30 September 1893. An enlarged vestry for the clergy was completed in 1902.

A road widening scheme caused the relocation of the churchyard walls in 1902, retaining the original railings, and on completion, a row of trees was planted to commemorate the Coronation of Edward VII and Alexandra. In 1909, work started on a new south aisle designed by W. D. Caröe and Herbert Passmore, which was completed in the following year and extended in 1928 to form a side chapel by C. E Kempe & Co. Caröe also added a flight of steps leading to the tower door. A prominent wheelchair ramp was added to the south in 2003, designed by Kay Pilsbury Architects.

St John's Church was given Grade II listed building status on 24 February 1987.

== Present day ==
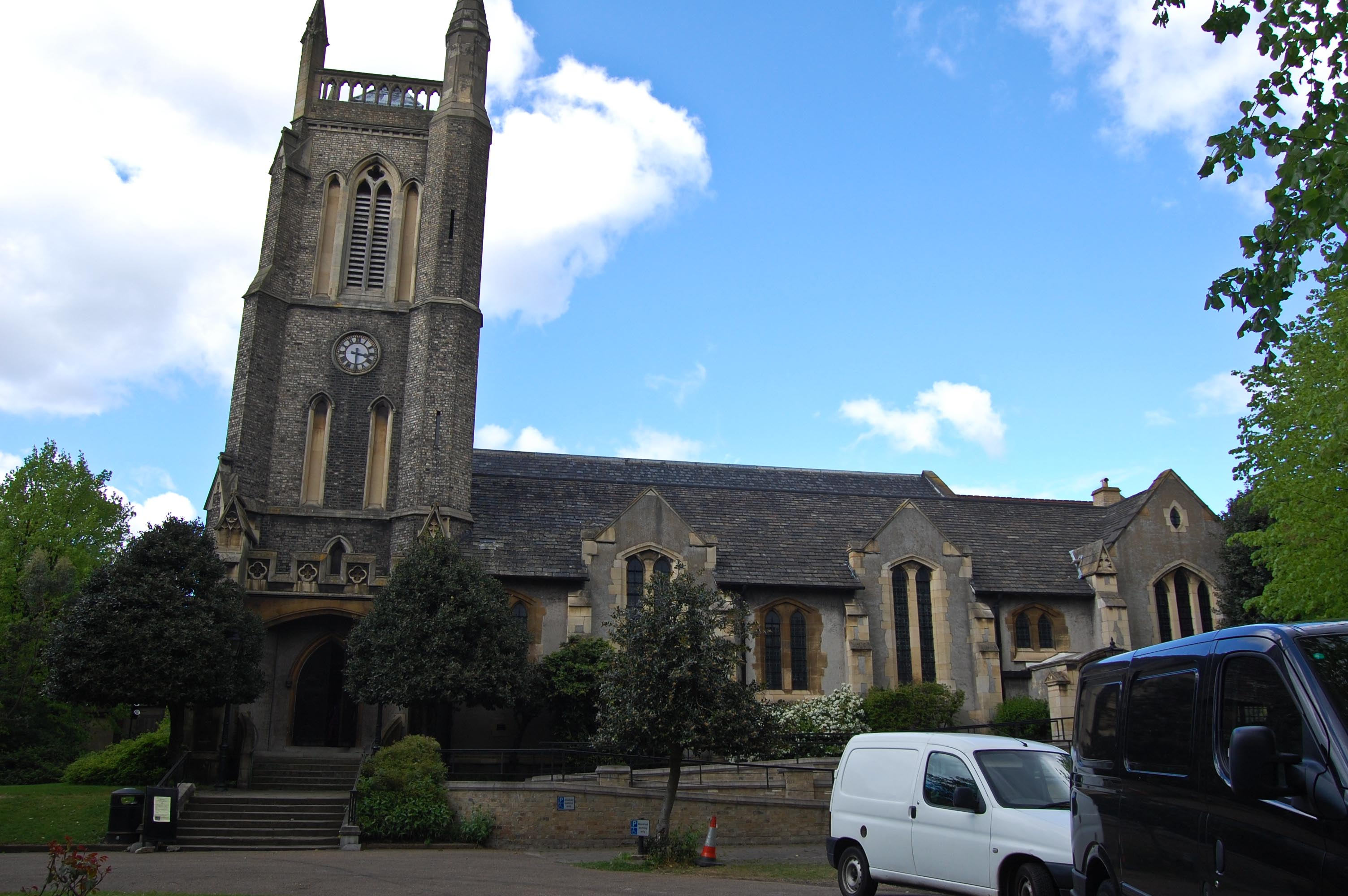
St John's Church from Church Lane E11 in 2010.

Reverend David Britton took up the post of vicar in July 2014.

=== Events ===
- The Stones Throw Market, where stallholders offer a mix of local designs including jewellery, pottery, glassware, vintage clothing and homemade cakes and tea.
- Churchyard Market
- Hitchcock outdoor film screenings in churchyard
- Tower Tours, views across London to Canary Wharf, The Shard, Gherkin etc. from the top of St John The Baptist's church tower.
- Repair Cafe, a Waltham Forest Council scheme, offering free repairs of bikes and electrical items.

=== Bell ringing ===
In 2020 there was an active team of bell ringers at St John's ring for Sunday services who practiced on Monday evenings. A notable former bell ringer was William Pye (1870-1935), who moved to Leytonstone in 1906 and was described by The Ringing World as "the greatest ringer of his time". Two treble bells were bought for St John's as a memorial to him, making a total ring of eight.
