= St Andrew's Church, Leytonstone =

Coordinates: 51.575565°N 0.007668°E

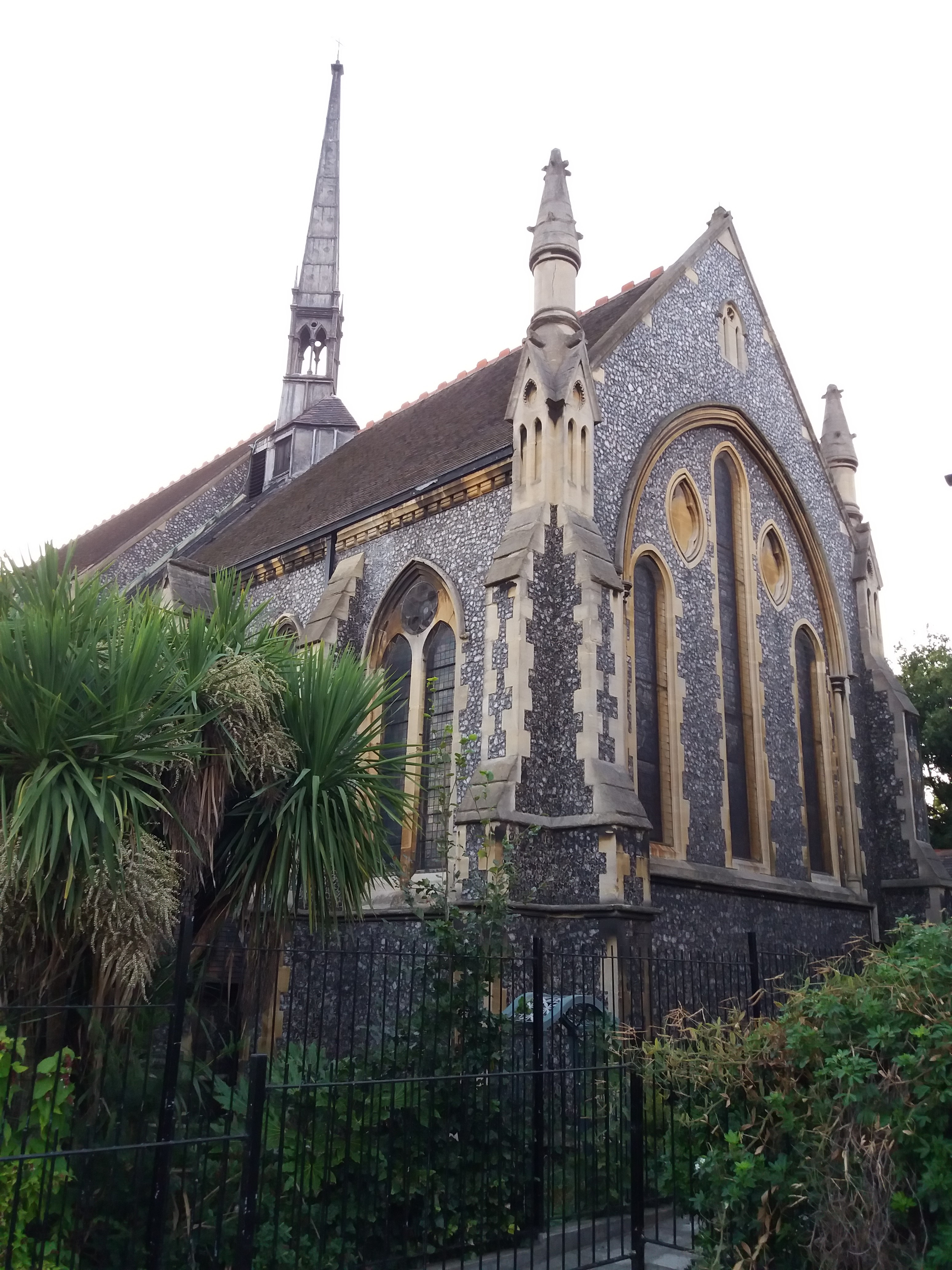
- View of the eastern end of St Andrew's Church
- St Andrew's Church, Leytonstone
- Location: Colworth Road Leytonstone, London, E11 1JD
- Country: England
- Denomination: Church of England
- Website: https://www.standrewsleytonstone.org/

History
- Status: Active
- Dedication: Andrew the Apostle
- Dedicated: 1887

Architecture
- Functional status: Parish church
- Heritage designation: Grade II listed
- Designated: 27 February 2006
- Architect: Arthur Blomfield
- Style: Early English Gothic
- Years built: 1886–1893

Administration
- Province: Canterbury
- Diocese: Chelmsford
- Archdeaconry: West Ham
- Deanery: Waltham Forest
- Parish: St Andrew Leytonstone

The Church of St Andrew, Leytonstone, is a Victorian era Church of England parish church in Leytonstone, East London, adjacent to Epping Forest. It is a Grade II listed building.

== History ==
The church is built on land which was part of the Wallwood Estate, which had been purchased in 1817 by William Cotton, a wealthy banker who would become the Governor of the Bank of England in 1843. He was also a leading philanthropist; besides supporting educational charities, he founded three new churches in the East End of London and made donations towards more than seventy others. William Cotton died in 1866; his son Sir Henry Cotton sold the estate for housing development in 1874, but one plot of land adjoining Forest Glade, part of Epping Forest, was reserved for the building of a new church as a memorial to his father.

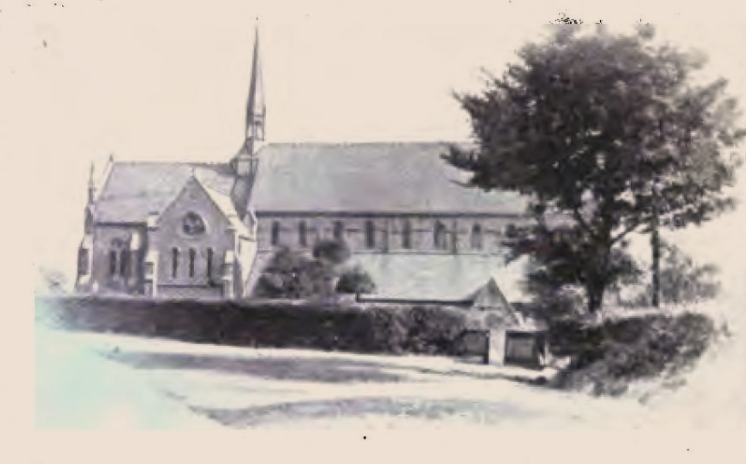
St Andrew's, Leytonstone, seen from the north from Forest Glade; circa 1904 before the construction of the vestries.

In 1882, a temporary corrugated iron building or "tin tabernacle" was erected on the plot to serve as a chapel of ease to St John the Baptist's Church, and was provisionally called the Cotton Memorial Church. Initially, the services were conducted by the clergy of St John's, but William Manning was appointed as the first incumbent in 1885. Work started on a large new church building to the design of Sir Arthur Blomfield, funded jointly by the Cotton family, the Bishop of St Alban's Fund and by the new congregation. The foundation stone was laid by Prince Arthur, Duke of Connaught in a ceremony on 18 June 1886, which was also attended by the Lord Mayor of London and five bishops; an account of the construction work by Woodward and Wilson, and a copy of The Times were sealed under the stone. The chancel was funded by the Cotton family as a memorial to William Cotton and was built to the highest standards; this and the first three bays of the nave were completed and closed off with a temporary wall so that the church could be consecrated and opened for services; the ceremony was conducted by Thomas Legh Claughton, the Bishop of St Albans on 30 April 1887. It became a separate ecclesiastical parish on 29 December 1887 and Manning became the first vicar. The congregation set about raising the £2,500 to complete the west end of the building, which when finished was dedicated by Bishop Claughton on Maundy Thursday, 30 March 1893.

St Andrew's quickly became the most popular church in the district, and in 1903 were able to report a total Sunday congregation of 1,519 people, 723 in the morning and 796 in the evening. In 1904, a church hall was built in the Arts and Crafts style, designed by Henry Charles Smart, an architect who lived in the parish. A vestry was added in 1913.

By the late 1960s, declining congregations at St Andrew's brought the threat of redundancy and a scheme to make the buildings more viable was put in hand. The church hall was sold, and in a conversion completed in 1977, the western bays of the nave were split from the main part of the church with a full-height wooden partition, glazed to the top. One of the bays was converted into a modern kitchen. The old church hall, which had been purchased by the adjacent Leytonstone School, was burned down in a suspected arson attack in September 2002, and a sympathetic three-storey development of thirteen flats was later constructed in its place. St Andrew's Church was given Grade II listed building status on 27 February 2006.

In June 2007, Rowan Williams, the Archbishop of Canterbury, together with Eric Pickles, the Secretary of State for Communities, visited St Andrew's in connection with the church's cooperative work with the nearby Shri Nathji Sanatan Hindu Mandir in Whipps Cross Road. Under the leadership of the current vicar, Fr Paul Kennington, the church has applied for a grant from the National Lottery Heritage Fund for improvements and the repair of subsidence to the vestry.

== Description ==
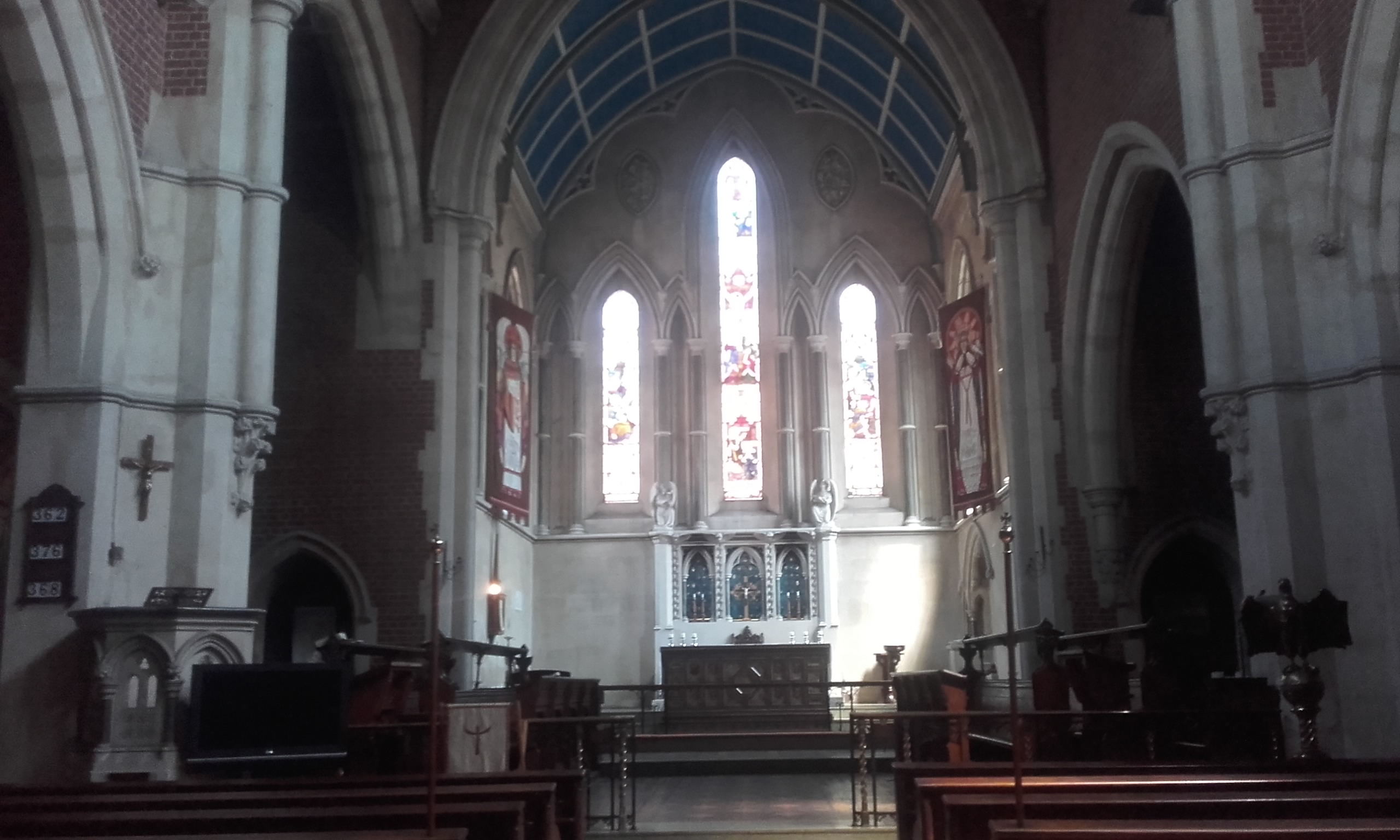
The interior of the chancel at St Andrew's, intended as a memorial to the philanthropist William Cotton.

The church is a large building in the Early English Gothic style, using Kentish ragstone with freestone dressings and a knapped flint. There is a slender flèche over the crossing. There are porches on the west and north sides and a large chancel to the east. The later vestry on the north east of the building is in a similar style. The west front has a tall central window featuring a pair of lancets and roundel, and a single lancet to each side, with pinnacles at the corners. There are low aisles on either side of a long nave of five bays. At the east end are three lancets and two roundels, also with pinnacles. Inside, the walls are lined by red brick with stone dressings to the arcade with moulded arches and circular columns. The chancel is ashlar-faced and features carving to the chancel arch corbels. The stained glass of the east windows is dated 1892. A wooden altar front has a painted lamb and angels. The chancel roof is a wooden barrel vault and the nave has an arched cruck roof with pierced timbers. The original pews in the nave and the choir stalls are of polished oak.

=== Stained glass ===
Many of the stained glass windows in the nave are the work of Margaret Chilton (1875–1963), a student of Christopher Whall, and date between 1919 and 1957. The earlier windows, some of which are war memorials, are in the Arts and Crafts tradition, but her later work shows some expressionist influences. Together, they form the most important collection of her work in England.

=== Organ ===
The pipe organ is based on a much earlier instrument acquired for St Andrew's in 1889 from St Jude's Church, Whitechapel. Following a fund raising campaign in 1913, the organ was fully rebuilt by the prestigious firm of Lewis & Co and the first recital was given on 28 September 1914 by Dr H. W. Richards, although work on it continued into the following year. Healey Willan, the Anglo-Canadian organist and composer, is known to have given an organ recital at St Andrew's. The organ was restored in the 1990s and in 2012 when the leather bellows needed repair, the choir and supporters staged a "sponsored hymnathon" to raise funds; this involved singing every hymn in The English Hymnal, which was achieved in 31 hours non-stop.

== Present day ==
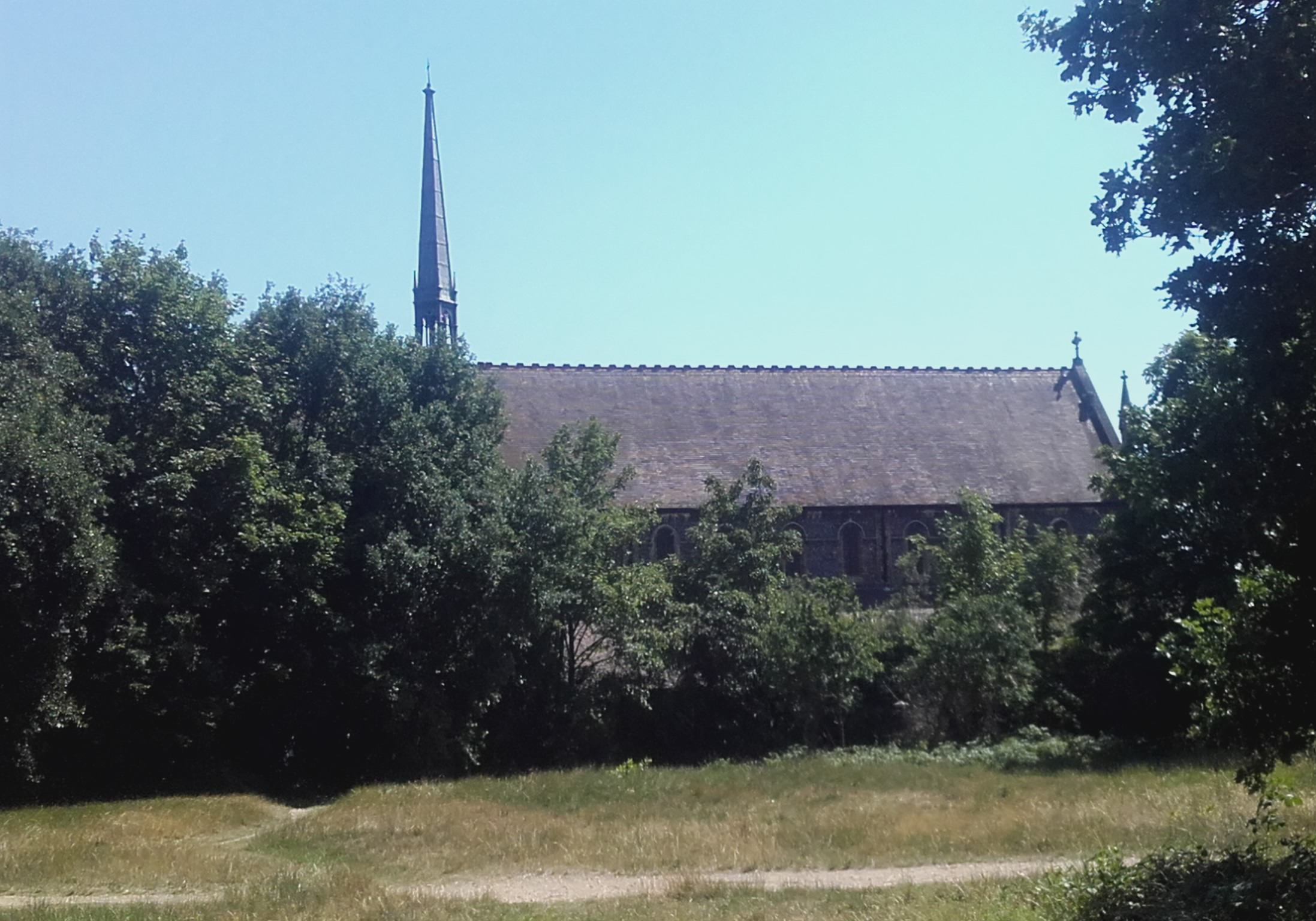
St Andrew's viewed from Forest Glade, part of Epping Forest.

The parish of St Andrew Leytonstone is in the Archdeaconry of West Ham and the Barking Episcopal Area of the Diocese of Chelmsford; it is the smallest parish by area in the Deanery of Waltham Forest. Worship is in the liberal Anglo-Catholic tradition, centred on the Sunday morning Eucharist. The church centre is used by a wide variety of community organisations including a preschool, a senior citizens’ group, art classes, a Scout Group and surgeries with local councillors, as well as providing a study space for teenagers to do homework.
