= Birch v Cropper =

1889 UK company law case

- Court: House of Lords
- Citation: (1889) 14 App Cas 525

Keywords
- Share

Birch v Cropper (1889) 14 App Cas 525 is a UK company law case concerning shares. It illustrates the principle of exhaustion, that the rights attached to a share in an article would be presumed exhaustive, although one should construe the nature of a share with a starting presumption of equality.

The principle is now subject to the advice given by Lord Hoffmann in Attorney General of Belize v Belize Telecom Ltd and ICS Ltd v West Bromwich BS.

== Facts ==
The company sold its canal business to another company and made a profit. It proposed to wind up and distribute the £500,000 remaining to shareholders. There were 130,000 ordinary shares. There were also 30,000 preference shares (with 5% preference on dividends), some one-third paid up, some fully paid up. There was nothing in the articles concerning the preferential shares' entitlements on winding up. The company argued that the preferential shares were just like debentures, and they should only get their money back. The preferential shareholders argued that they should be entitled to a priority in the distribution.

== Judgment ==
The House of Lords held clearly preferential shares were not debentures, they are equity, because the 5% preference would not be paid if there was no profit, whereas a 5% interest rate would have to be. To calculate their entitlement on winding up, the court should begin the process of construction with a presumption of equality. Since it was deemed that the provision on 5% extra dividends was exhaustive, and there was no indication this should apply to winding up, there was no automatic right to more preferential distributions on winding up.

Lord Macnaghten noted that preference shareholders ‘must be treated as having all the rights of shareholders, except so far as they renounced these rights on their admission to the company.’

== See also ==
- UK company law
- Andrews v Gas Meter Co [1897] 1 Ch 361
