= Joseph Cotton (mariner) =

English mariner and merchant

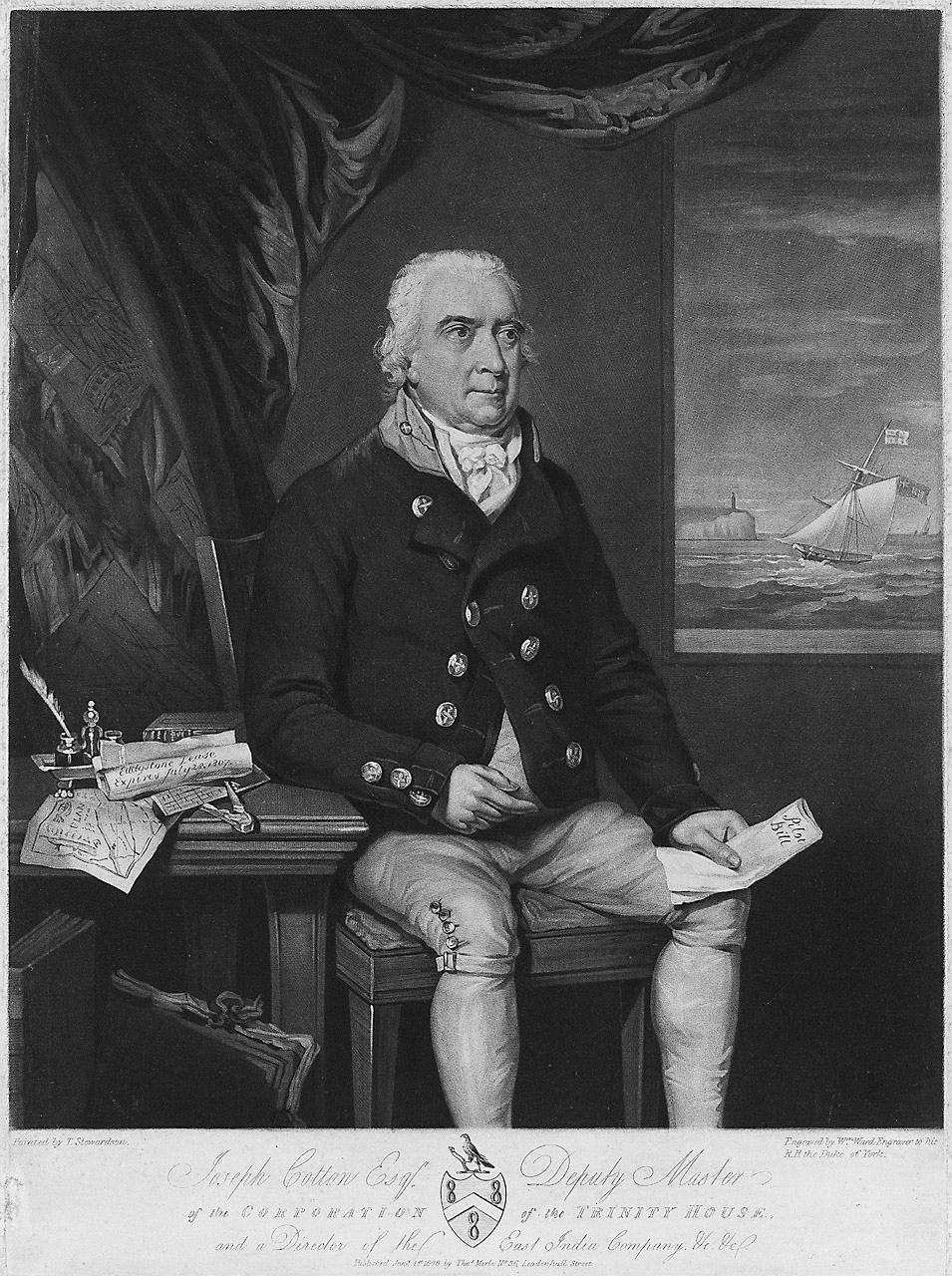
Joseph Cotton (1745–1825) (William Ward, 1808)

Joseph Cotton FRS (7 March 1745 – 26 January 1825), was an English mariner and merchant, a director of the East India Company and deputy-master of Trinity House.

Cotton was born at St Albans, Hertfordshire, England, the third son of Dr. Nathaniel Cotton. He entered the Royal Navy in 1760 and passed the examination for lieutenant, but left the navy and joined the East India Company.

He made a fortune from two voyages as captain of the Royal Charlotte, an East Indiaman. He then retired and lived the rest of his life in Leyton, Essex, living at Leyton House from 1789 to 1803, and in Walnut Tree House (today Essex Hall) beginning in 1813.

In 1788, he was elected an "elder brother" of Trinity House, and in 1803 became deputy-master, holding the latter post for about twenty years. He published a memoir about the origin of Trinity House in 1818.

He was a director of the East India Company from 1795 to 1823; he was also a director of the East India Dock Company (chairman in 1803), and a governor of the London Assurance Corporation, and the English Copper Company.

He attempted to introduce ramie, a fibre plant, for use in manufacturing, and was awarded a silver medal for this in 1814 by the Society for the Encouragement of Arts and Manufactures; however, the fibre found little commercial usage.

He became a Fellow of the Royal Society in 1810.

He died in Leyton in 1825 and was buried at the local parish church.

== Family ==
He married Sarah Harrison in 1779, and they had 10 children, including William Cotton (a governor of the Bank of England) and John Cotton, who became Chairman of the East India Company.

He was also grandfather of Henry Cotton (appeals court judge), William Charles Cotton (apiarist) and William Cotton Oswell (explorer) and the great-grandfather of Henry John Stedman Cotton (civil servant in India and Governor of Assam).
