= Nathaniel Cotton =

English physician and poet

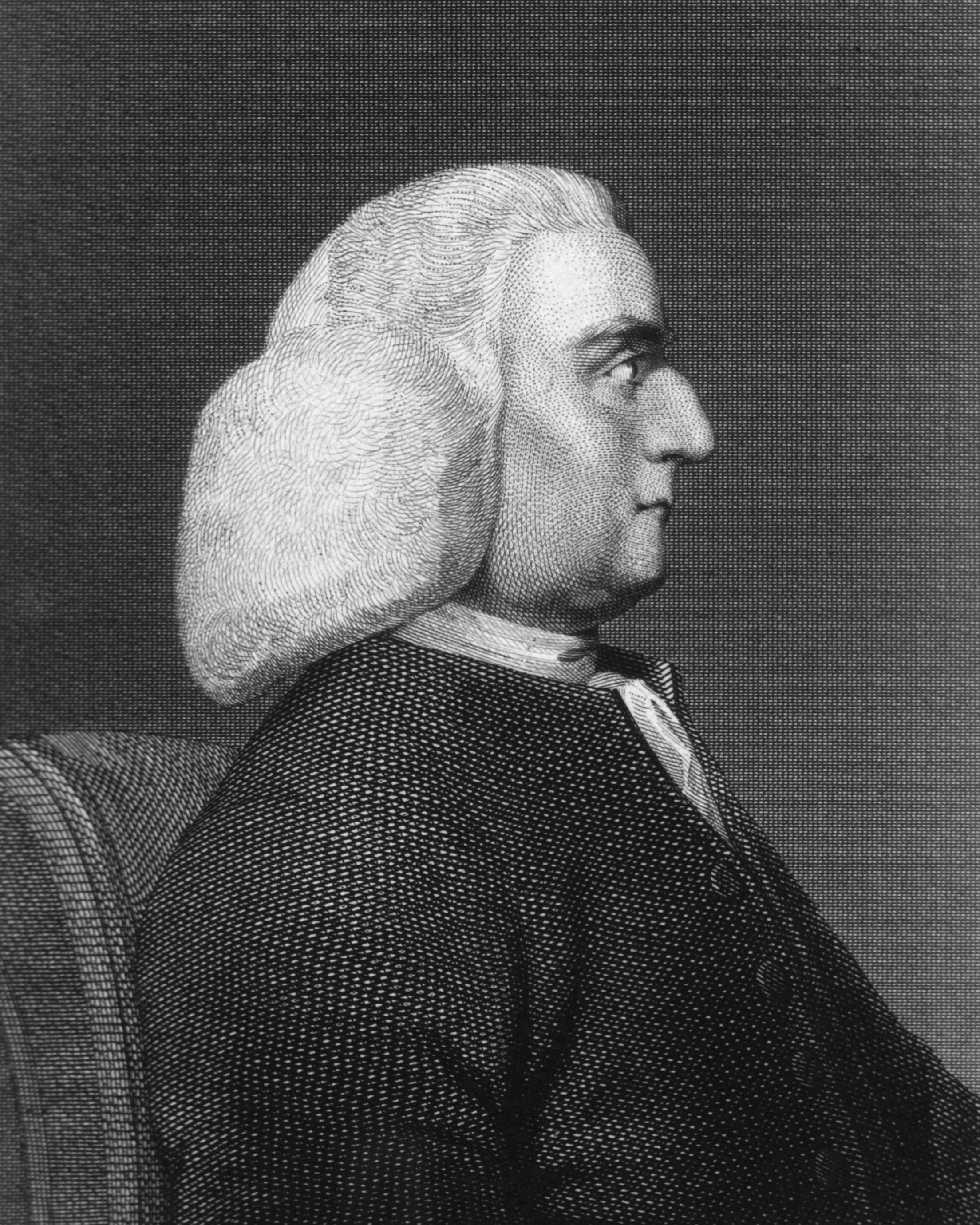
Nathaniel Cotton

Nathaniel Cotton (/ˈkɒtən/; 1707 – 2 August 1788) was an English physician and poet.

Cotton is thought to have studied at Leiden University, possibly under Herman Boerhaave. Cotton specialised in the care of patients with mental health issues, maintaining an asylum known as the Collegium Insanorum, at St Albans. William Cowper was one of his patients and held Cotton in high regard.

Cotton was also a published poet, whose poems were described by Cheever as "full of good sense, benevolence, and piety" although not works of genius. He was the author of Visions in Verse, first published in 1751; and a two volume complete collection of his works was published in 1791.

He was married twice, first in 1738 to Anne Pembroke, with whom he had eight children, six of whom survived past infancy and one, Joseph Cotton, who became a director of the Honourable East India Company. His second marriage in 1750 or 51 was to Hannah Everett, with whom he had a son and two daughters. He died at St Albans on 2 August 1788 and is buried in St. Peter's churchyard.

After Cotton's death the asylum was run by Dr Stephen Pellet.
