= William Cotton Oswell =

English explorer

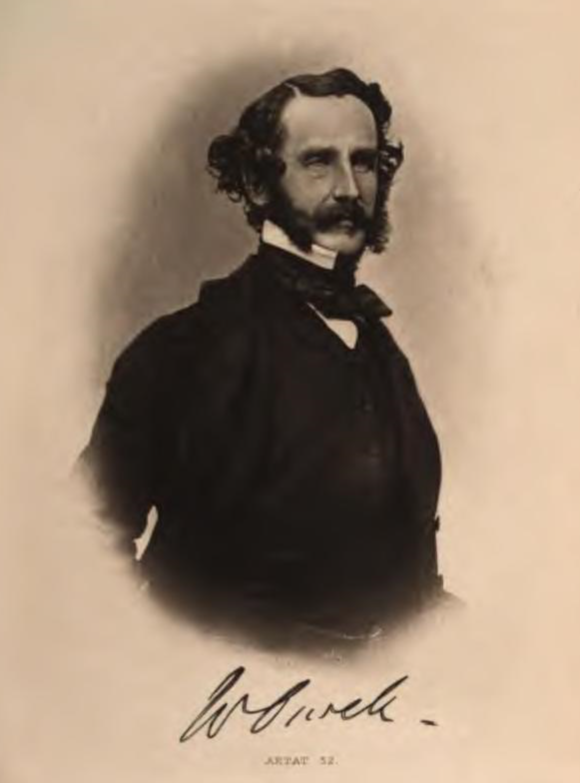
William Cotton Oswell

William Cotton Oswell (27 April 1818 – 1 May 1893) was an English explorer in Africa and other areas.

He was born in Leytonstone, Essex and attended Rugby School. In 1837 he secured a position with the East India Company in Madras through his uncle John Cotton, who was a director of the company. He spent ten years there, learning Tamil and other languages and studying surgery and medicine.

He was sent to South Africa for health reasons, and explored the Kalahari Desert in Bechuanaland (now Botswana) and located Lake Ngami. He participated in expeditions to the Zambezi river with David Livingstone; one of Livingstone's children, born in Botswana in 1851, was named William Oswell Livingstone. On another expedition he became the first European to see Mumbuluma Falls and Kalambo Falls in what has since become Zambia. He returned to England in 1853 and performed medical duties during the Crimean War. In 1855–56 he traveled in North and South America. In 1860, he married his wife Agnes, settled in Groombridge, Kent, and had five children.

The species Rhinoceros oswellii was named for him (this name is no longer used in modern taxonomy). Livingstone described Oswell as having had lucky escapes, having been tossed by a rhinoceros on two occasions.

== Family ==
Through his grandfather Joseph Cotton (1746–1825), William Cotton Oswell was a cousin of the judge Henry Cotton and a first cousin once removed of Henry John Stedman Cotton.

William Cotton Oswell's wife's father's mother Willielmina Cornthwaite was the sister of Ann Cornthwaite, the mother of the mother of Rev. Prof. Baden Powell, the father of the first Lord Baden-Powell, who wrote about "my cousin William Cotton Oswell", who was actually the husband of his father's second cousin.

== See also ==
- List of famous big game hunters
