= Henry Cotton (politician) =

British member of the Indian Civil Service and Liberal Party politician

Sir Henry John Stedman Cotton KCSI
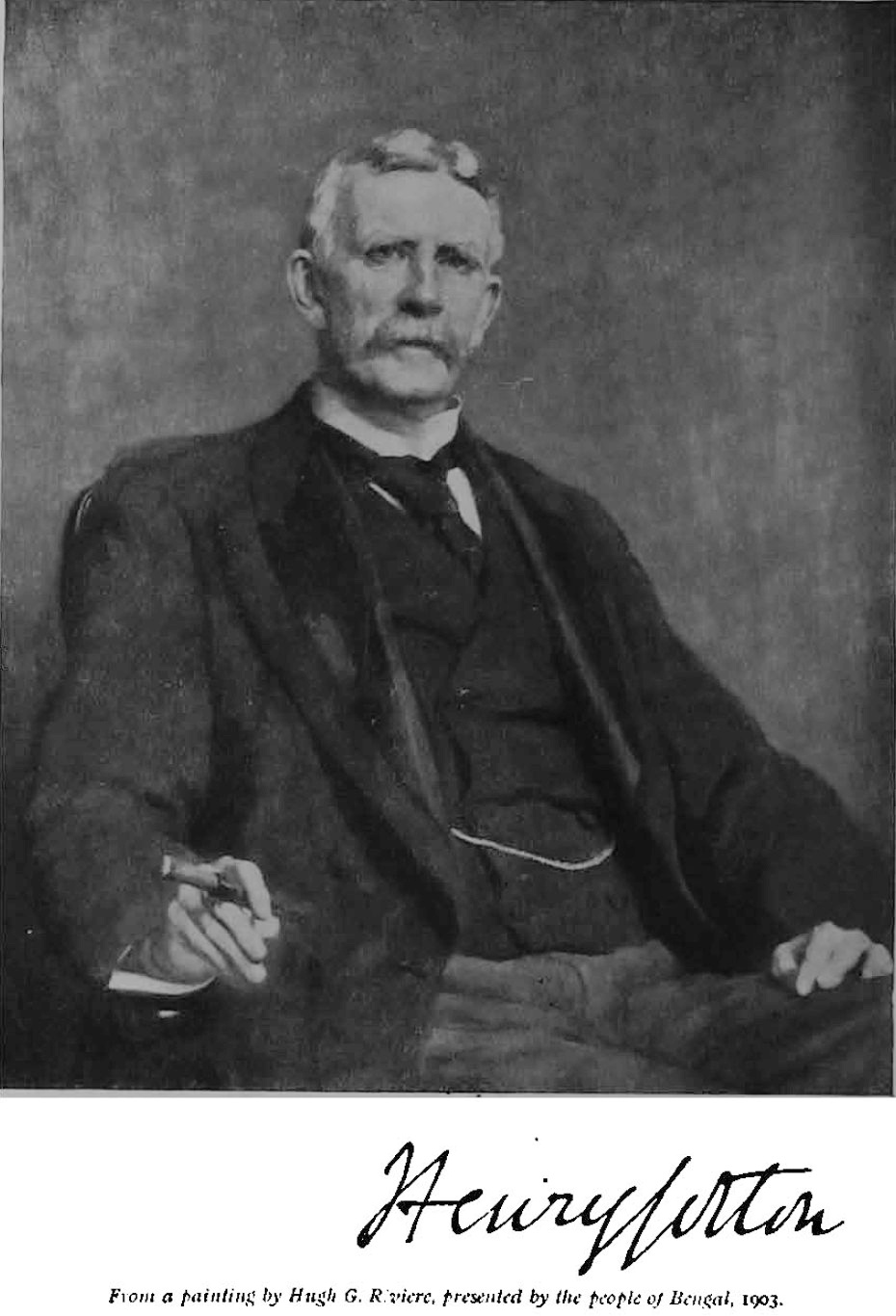
- Born: 13 September 1845; Kumbakonam, British India
- Died: 22 October 1915 (aged 70); St John's Wood, London, United Kingdom
- Education: Magdalen College, Oxford; King's College London
- Occupations: civil servant, Member of Parliament, Author
- Political party: Liberal Party
- Spouse(s): Mary, Lady Cotton (née Ryan)

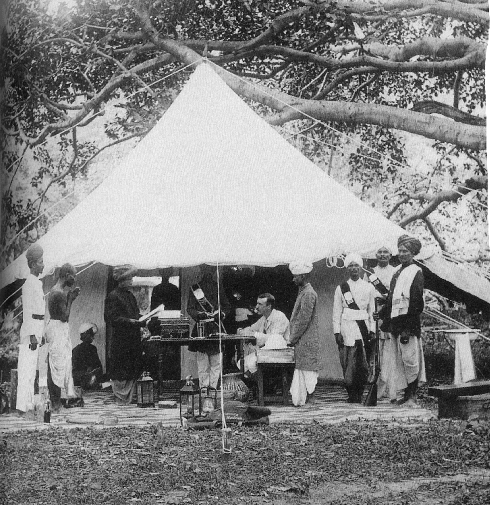
Henry Cotton dispensing justice in Bengal

Sir Henry John Stedman Cotton, KCSI (13 September 1845 – 22 October 1915) had a long career in the Indian Civil Service, during which he was sympathetic to Indian nationalism and labourers in Assam's tea plantations. He was elected the president of the Indian National Congress in 1904 at the height of the Bengal partition. After returning to England, he served as a Liberal Party Member of Parliament (MP) for Nottingham East from 1906 to January 1910.

== Early life ==
Henry was born in 1845 in the city of Kumbakonam in the Madras region of India, to Indian-born parents of English descent, Joseph John Cotton (1813–1867) and Susan Jessie Minchin (1823–1888).

He became the Chief Commissioner of Assam in 1897, from which post he retired in 1902.

Through his paternal great-grandfather Joseph Cotton (1745–1825), Henry John Stedman Cotton was a first cousin once removed of both the judge Henry Cotton (his godfather, who he was named after) and of the African explorer William Cotton Oswell. The British man of letters James S. Cotton was his brother.

In 1848, he left India to be educated in England. He entered Magdalen College School in 1856, Brighton College in 1859, and King's College London in 1861. After his graduation from college, he took and passed the Indian Civil Service Examination.

== Career ==
Cotton joined the Indian Civil Service in Bengal Presidency, arriving in India in 1867. His first posting was at Midnapore, where his immediate superior was Sir William James Herschel, then the local magistrate. His eldest son Evan was born in that city in 1868.

He later served in Chuadanga, where he witnessed the great flood of 1871. In 1872 he was posted to Calcutta, and in 1873 he was appointed Assistant Secretary to the Bengal Government by Sir George Campbell, and later worked under Sir Richard Temple. In 1878 he became magistrate and collector at Chittagong; in 1880 he became Senior Secretary to the Board of Revenue in Bengal. He later became Revenue Secretary to Government, Financial and Municipal Secretary, and then a member of the Bengal Legislative Council.

In 1885 he was appointed a fellow of the University of Calcutta and was elected unopposed to the Calcutta Municipal Corporation. In the same year, he published his book, New India or India in Transition. Cotton eventually rose to be Chief Commissioner of Assam (1896 to 1902), during which time he experienced the 1897 Assam earthquake. The Viceroy, Lord Curzon, visited Assam in March 1900, and in an address afterwards praised Cotton's "effort and interest in the province", but was otherways unusually careful not to promise much in his speeches during the visit.

In 1901 when Cotton recommended an increase in the wages for the tea plantation workers, the Indian Tea Association campaigned heavily against him in the Anglo-Indian press and lobbied to create trouble for him with his superiors. This eventually marred his prospects in the Indian Civil Services. Nevertheless, he undertook some corrective administrative measures based on inspections of the province's plantations.

Cotton College, Guwahati, the oldest institute of higher education in Assam and all of Northeast India was established in 1901 by Cotton.

== Post-retirement ==
As he retired, he was appointed a Knight Commander of the Order of the Star of India (KCSI) in the 1902 Coronation Honours list published on 26 June 1902, and invested as such by King Edward VII at Buckingham Palace on 24 October 1902.

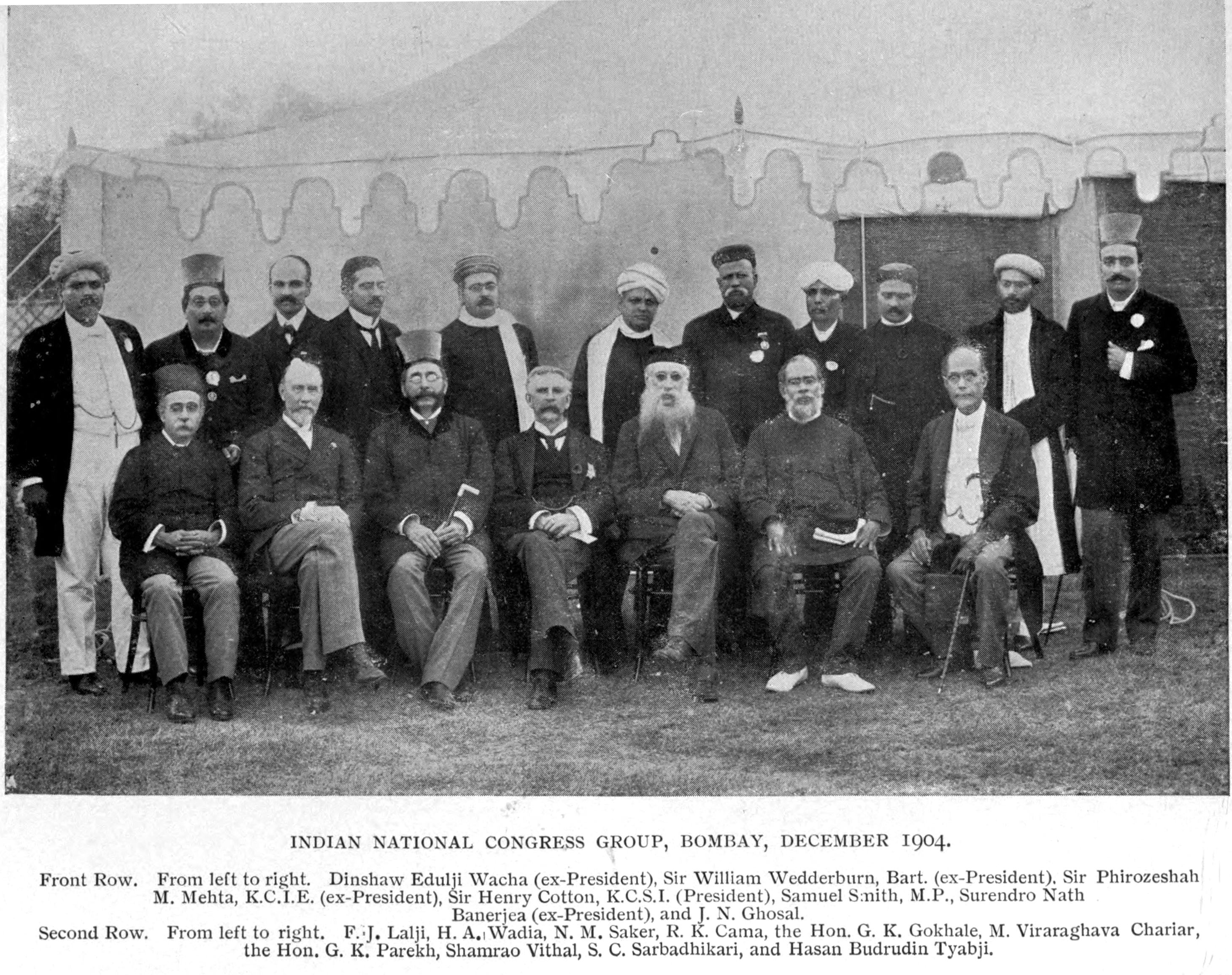
Some of the Indian National Congress' 1904 participants. Cotton is seated in the front row, fourth from the left. Taken from his book, Indian and home memories (1911).

Cotton supported Indian Home Rule and got into serious trouble when he advocated the cause in his 1885 book New India, or India in Transition (revised edition 1907). He returned to India at the height of partition of Bengal in 1904. He presided over the twentieth session of the Indian National Congress at Bombay. His presidential address showcased his deep understanding of Indian struggles under colonial rule. He recognised the INC's vital role in shaping the history and character of India. Under his presidency, the INC organised a conference on the partition in Calcutta. He traced the history of partition to 1891, when it was first discussed until 1897 when he was the Chief Commission of Assam. When the Lushai Hills was transferred to Assam, he argued, the matter was dropped. In his opinion the governments of Assam and Bengal never proposed partition, and it was a motion "spontaneously and uninvited from the Government of India itself." As such, he led the opposition to Lord Curzon's invasion of Tibet and partition of Bengal.

On his return to England, Cotton was elected Liberal Party Member of Parliament (MP) for Nottingham East in 1906. He joined the India group in the House of Commons, a radical pro-Indian parliamentary group, and criticised his own government's actions in India. Already in poor health, he was narrowly defeated in his attempt for re-election in 1910.

== Personal life ==
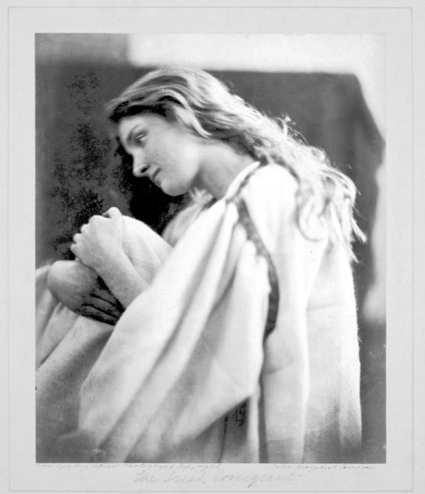
Mary, Lady Cotton (née Ryan), photographed by Julia Margaret Cameron.

In 1867 in Freshwater, Isle of Wight, Cotton married Mary Ryan (1848–1914). They had four children: Evan (1868–1939), Julian James Cotton (1869–1927), Mary Cotton (b. 1873), and Albert Louis Cotton (1874–1936).

Cotton met and married Ryan having seen a picture of her taken by pioneering photographer Julia Margaret Cameron. Ryan had been partly raised by Cameron, who found her as a child begging on Putney Heath. The couple were photographed together by Cameron, in costume as Romeo and Juliet, on their wedding day.

Two of his sons, Evan and Julian, also made careers in the civil service in India. Cotton's grandson, Sir John Cotton (1909–2002), was Ambassador to the Congo Republic and Burundi and the last of six generations of Cottons to serve in colonial administration in India.

He was an active writer and activist on behalf of Indian rights until the end of his life, despite ill health and financial difficulties. In 1885 he wrote New India or India in transition. It was aimed to draw attention of the ruling class for policy making in view of the great social, political and religious changes that were taking place in India at the time. In 1911 he published his memoirs, Indian and Home Memories. Sir Henry Cotton died at his home in St John's Wood, London, in October 1915.

== Bibliography ==
- Behal, Rana P. (2014). One Hundred Years of Solitude: Political Economy of Tea Plantations in Colonial Assam. New Delhi: Tulika Books.

Government offices
Preceded by William Erskine Ward	Chief Commissioner of Assam; 1896–1902	Succeeded by Sir Bampfylde Fuller
Parliament of the United Kingdom
Preceded by Edward Bond	Member of Parliament for Nottingham East; 1906 – January 1910	Succeeded by James Morrison
