= Imperial Hydropathic Hotel Co v Hampson =

Imperial Hydropathic Hotel Co, Blackpool v Hampson
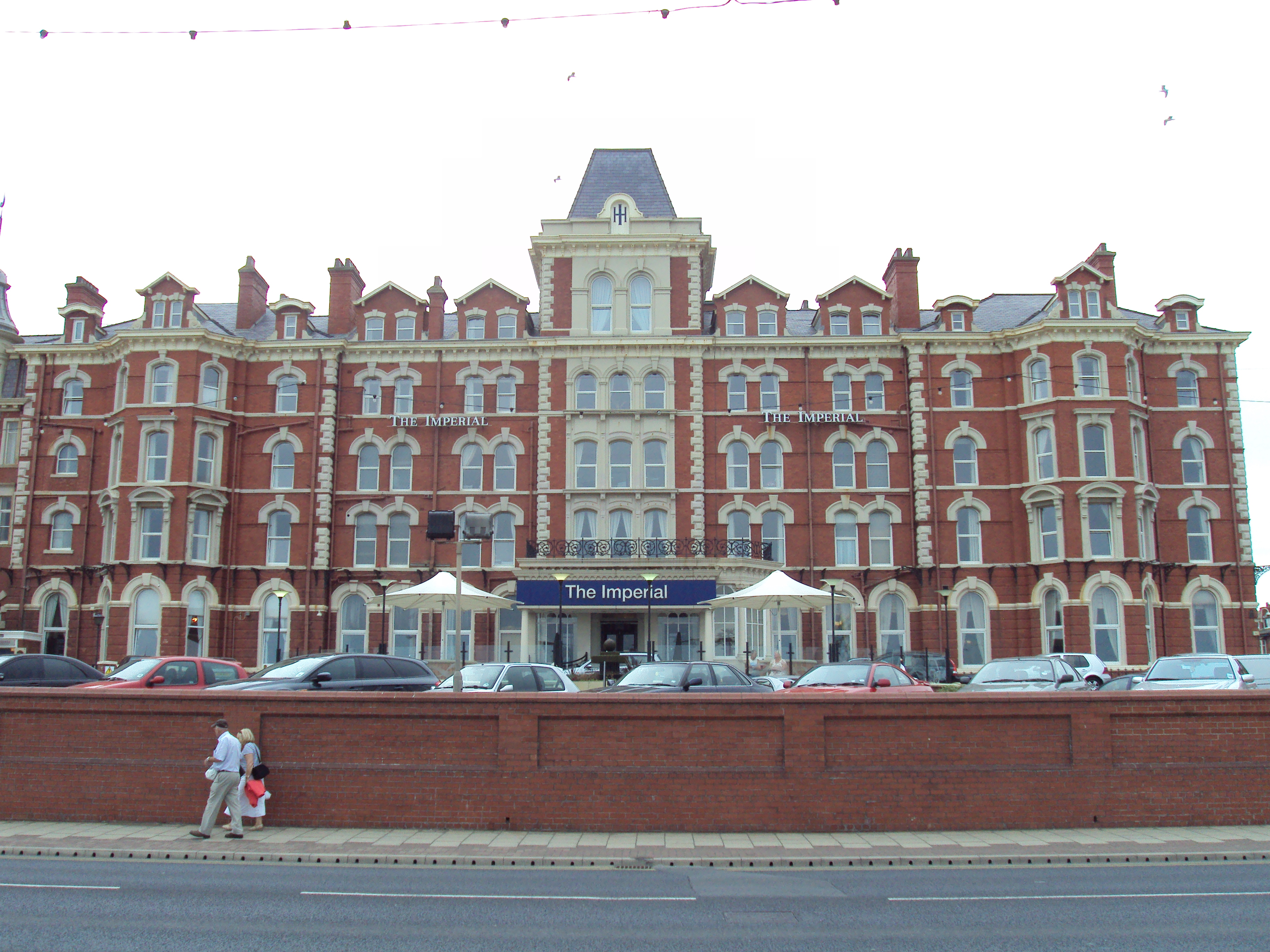
- The Imperial Hotel, in Blackpool
- Court: Court of Appeal
- Decided: 15 December 1882
- Citation: (1883) LR 23 Ch D 1

Case opinions
- Cotton LJ, Lord Jessel MR and Bowen LJ

Keywords
- Director removal, articles of association

Imperial Hydropathic Hotel Co, Blackpool v Hampson (1883) 23 Ch D 1 is a UK company law case, concerning the interpretation of a company's articles of association. On the specific facts it has been superseded by the Companies Act 2006 section 168, which allows a director to be removed through an ordinary majority resolution of the general meeting.

== Facts ==
The articles of association of the Imperial Hydropathic Hotel Co (now The Imperial Hotel Blackpool) stated that the directors should hold office for three years and retire by rotation. At a general meeting, the shareholders passed a resolution to remove two directors who were not yet due to retire, and elected two others instead. The company claimed the directors had been validly removed.

== Judgment ==
The Court of Appeal held that the company's articles could not be disregarded through a shareholder resolution. Where a company's articles limit the general meeting's power, the articles must be formally amended first, and may not simply be ignored, even with a majority large enough to change the articles. Sir George Jessel MR gave the first judgment.

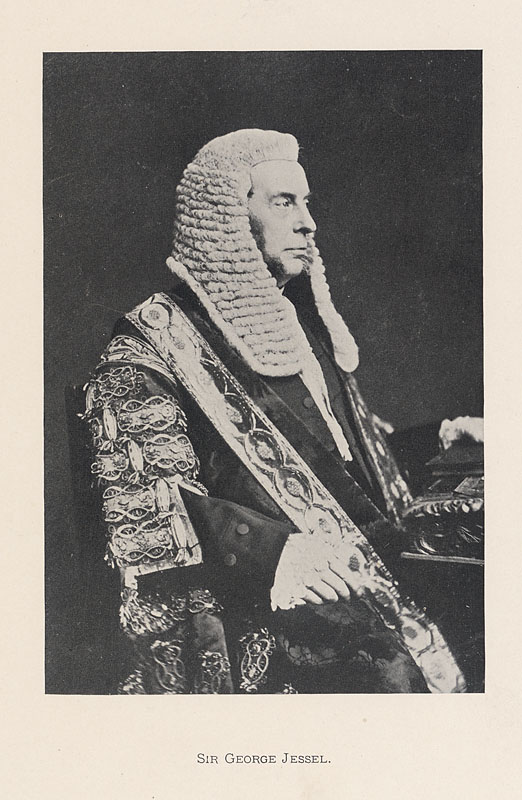
Sir George Jessel.

The appeal in this case is brought against an order of Vice-Chancellor Bristowe, and it certainly raises a new question, namely, whether without express statutory authority a company can in general meeting remove its directors. That is the chief question argued. Now when we consider the nature of these companies we find that they are statutory corporations, created under the Companies Act 1862, section 18 of which says that the subscribers to the memorandum and the other members shall on registration be a body corporate by the name contained in the memorandum of association, capable forthwith of exercising all the functions of an incorporated company. I find no other power given to them by express words as regards their proceedings, except under the 50th section, which gives them the power of altering their regulations by special resolutions. They also have the power if they think fit, but not otherwise, of adopting the rules contained in Schedule A. to the Act of Parliament. There is one section of those regulations which it is material to consider, because it has a bearing on the general terms of the Act of Parliament. It is art. 65 of Table A.: “The company in general meeting may by a special resolution remove any director before the expiration of his period of office, and may by an ordinary resolution appoint another person in his stead; the person so appointed shall hold office during such time only as the director in whose place he is appointed would have held the same if he had not been removed.” So that it is plain that the enactors of this Act of Parliament did not imagine that there was an express power to remove in the Act of Parliament itself, otherwise this would have been entirely superfluous.

The fact of the company being a corporation is not quite conclusive of the question: because it may well be that either from the nature of the corporation itself or by reason of a special provision you ought to infer this power. I will consider both points. First of all, is there any necessity? I think not. If the regulations of the company either prohibit the removal of the director or contain no provision like that in Table A. for the removal of the director, you can insert such a provision in the articles of association by special resolution under sect. 50. Therefore, whenever the occasion arises that you require to remove a director without special cause shewn, you cannot accomplish that object except under that power in the articles of association, and if you have given yourselves the power of removing the director, then you can proceed to exercise that power by an act of removal. Therefore, that appears to me to be a strong argument against the incidental power of removal. The only other question is whether the power is inherent in a corporation—it is quite plain to me it is not incidental to a corporation. As regards the corporators themselves it has been decided that in ordinary corporations there is a power of removal from the corporation for good cause. From the nature of the case one would assume that. Take the case of a municipal corporation—a corporation for the government of a town—if the head of a corporation became incapable of carrying on his functions it would be unreasonable to assume that there was no inherent power in the corporation to remove him and appoint some one else in his stead. So in the same way you might make by-laws that whenever a corporator was incapable of exercising his functions either from personal incapacity, or because he had become infamous or otherwise unfit, he might be removed from the corporation; but all that is a necessary incident for carrying out the purposes for which the corporation is created, and it stands on a totally different footing from removing a person from an office in the corporation. It appears to me there is no doctrine of the Common Law, and there is no statutory provision which enables you to vary the contract entered into between the members that the directors shall hold office for a given period, supposing there is a contract which does not contain the power of removal. That special power not being there, I think that disposes of the notion that you can remove by some inherent power not contained in the statute or the articles.

Now, as regards the other point, I think there can be no doubt whatever. The directors are to be elected in the ordinary way, to hold office for a certain period, obviously until they retire. There are provisions for the retirement in the ordinary way, and of course the meaning of the articles is that until the retirement they hold office and continue to hold office. Therefore, it comes to this, that the directors once elected hold office during the period for which they are elected without any power of removal.

The only other argument addressed to us is this:—It is said that under the special terms of these articles of association you can remove the directors; and for that purpose it is therefore necessary to see what the special terms are. The 44th clause is relied on: “The company may from time to time by a resolution passed by at least three-fourths of the votes of the shareholders present personally or by proxy at any extraordinary meeting, repeal, alter, or add to any of the regulations of the company, whether contained in the articles of association or not, provided that such resolution be confined to the object or business specified in the notice convening the meeting.” Then the 45th clause requires seven days' notice at least, “specifying the place, the time, the hour of meeting, and the purpose for which any general meeting is to be held.” Then clause 46: “Any shareholder may, on giving not less than three days' previous notice, submit any resolution to a meeting beyond the matters contained in the notice given of such meeting,” which is to be left under the 47th at the registered office of the company. Now, that being the position of matters, it is suggested that under clause 44 the company can by resolution remove two directors. In my opinion they cannot. They can only alter the articles of association. On the contrary, by the resolution which was passed, they left the articles alone. The articles remained, prescribing the whole term of office, three years, or whatever it might be. They have not altered them in the least, but they have passed a simple resolution that two specially named directors shall be removed from office. In my opinion that is not in the purview of clause 44 at all. If they wanted to act under clause 44 they should have had passed a clause enabling the company to remove the directors, and then when they had conferred on themselves that power they might have acted upon it. That, I think, disposes of the whole matter.

But it was suggested that three days' notice given of a resolution by a shareholder would do instead of the notice specified in clause 45. In my opinion it would not. The notice given by clause 45 is to be given to every shareholder. The notice given by clause 46 is only to be left at the registered office of the company, the one notice is seven days' notice, and the other is three days' notice. It is plain to me that the notice to be given under clause 46 is something ancillary or subsidiary, which could be properly brought forward under the terms of the notice convening the meeting, and therefore the resolution passed at the first meeting was passed on a bad notice. As regards the second meeting it is not necessary to decide whether the second meeting had power to remove directors. The result, therefore, will be that this appeal will be dismissed with costs.

Cotton LJ concurred, saying,

in my opinion it is an entire fallacy to say that because there is power to alter the regulations, you can by a resolution which might alter the regulations, do that which is contrary to the regulations as they stand in a particular and individual case. It is in no way altering the regulations. The alteration of the regulations would be by introducing a provision, not that some particular director be discharged from being a director, but that directors be capable of being removed by the vote of a general meeting. It is a very different thing to pass a general rule applicable to every one who comes within it, and to pass a resolution against a particular individual, which would be a privilegium and not a law. Now here there was no attempt to pass any resolution at this meeting which would affect any director, except those who are aimed at by the resolution, no alteration of the regulations was to bind the company to those regulations as altered...

Bowen LJ finished as follows.

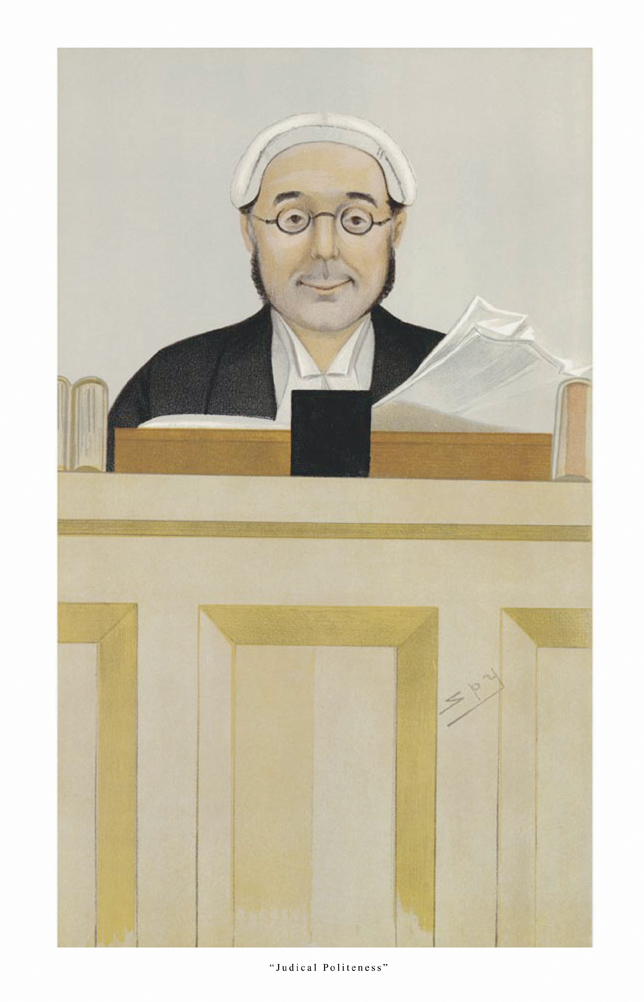
Bowen LJ as caricatured by Spy (Leslie Ward) in Vanity Fair, March 1892

It is neither a question of removal of an officer nor of an agent of a common law corporation. We are discussing the rights of directors of a statutory corporation created by the Act of 1862, and in such a case we must consider what are the rights of the directors and shareholders, for the articles of association, by sect. 16, are to bind all the company and all the shareholders as much as if they had all put their seals to them. Therefore you must look, when you are considering the question of dismissal of a director, to see whether the articles of association have been complied with. When we look at the articles of association it seems quite clear that they are not complied with. It seems to me that as regards the first meeting the Appellants are out of Court, and as regards the second meeting the vice of their position is this, that they are treating what has been done at this meeting as if it amounted to an alteration of the regulations, whereas it is only a displacement of individuals. I do not think it is possible to find language that would more happily express my view than that of Lord Justice Cotton. It is a mistake to suppose that a law and a privilegium are the same, or that you are really altering the regulations when you are attempting to deprive an individual of the benefit of them.

== See also ==
- UK company law
