= William Cotton (banker) =

English inventor, merchant and philanthropist (1786 - 1866)

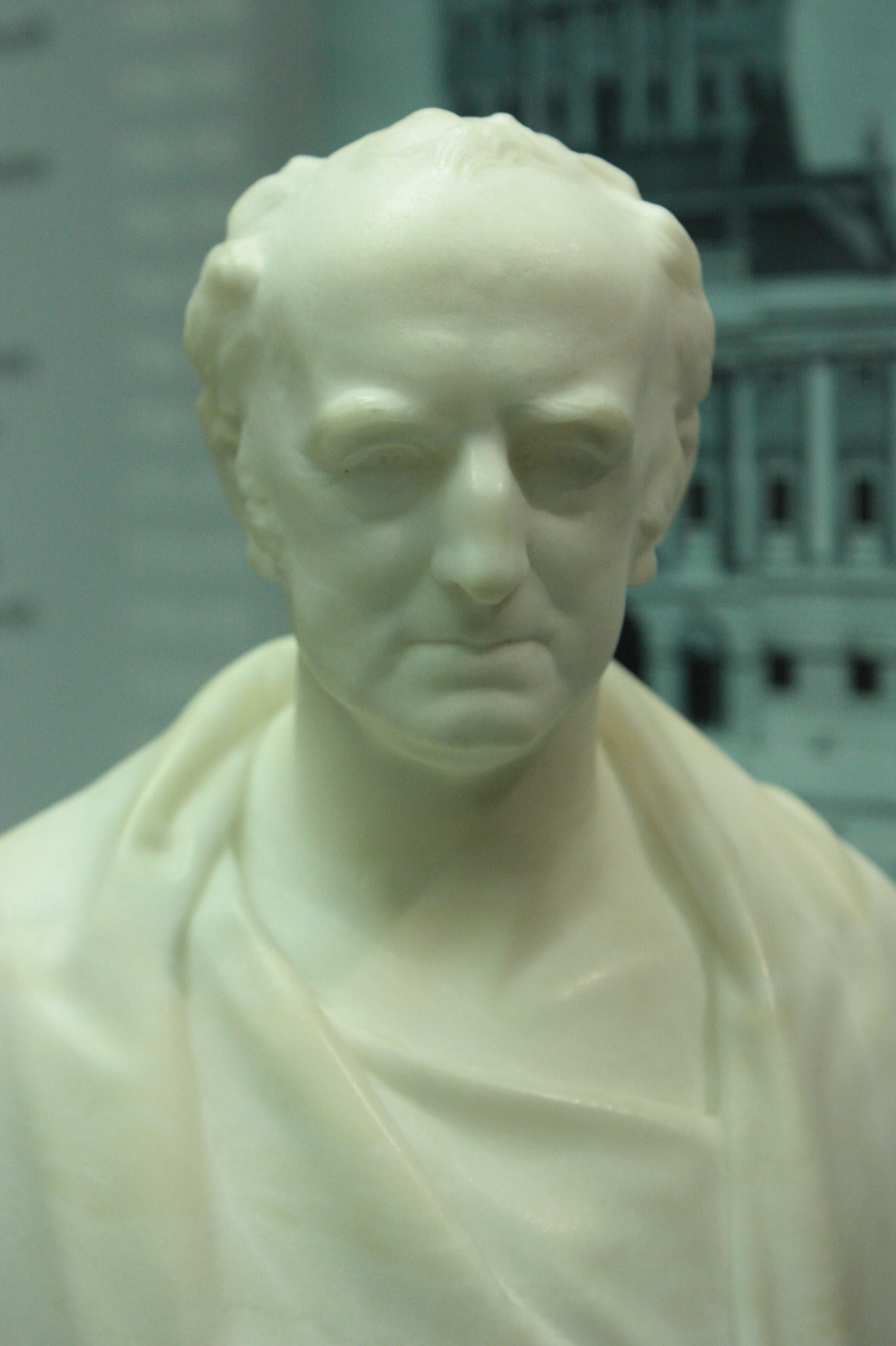
- William Cotton, 1855
- Born: 12 September 1786; Leytonstone, England
- Died: 1 December 1866 (aged 80); Walwood House, Leytonstone, England
- Occupations: inventor, merchant, philanthropist, Banker
- Spouse: Sarah Lane (m. 1812)
- Children: William Charles Cotton; Sarah Acland; Henry Cotton; Agnes Cotton
- Father: Joseph Cotton

William Cotton FRS (12 September 1786 – 1 December 1866) was an English inventor, merchant, philanthropist, and Governor of the Bank of England from 1842 to 1845.

== Life ==
Cotton was born in Leytonstone, the son of Joseph Cotton, who made his fortune as a Captain with the East India Company and was later Deputy Master of Trinity House in 1803, and a director of the East India Company. He was educated at the nearby Chigwell Grammar School. His brother, John Cotton, later became a director and chairman of the East India Company.

In 1807 Cotton became a partner in the cordage manufacturers Huddart & Co., in Limehouse. He was later general manager, until 1838.

He became governor of the Bank of England in 1842, with the usual term of two years being extended to three in recognition of his securing a new charter for the bank with the passage of the 1844 Bank Charter Act. During his time at the bank, he developed a machine for the weighing of gold sovereigns, which was capable of weighing twenty-three coins every minute to an accuracy of one ten-thousandth of a grain. Automatic weighing machines did not replace simpler tools. Rocker balances and gauges remained in use for smaller-scale testing and were later adapted to other European gold currencies as well. He was a Fellow of the Royal Society from 1821.

He served as High Sheriff of Essex in 1838. In his lifetime Cotton was active in funding Canon Nathaniel Woodard's national network of Woodard Schools, and passive in the funding and establishment of new churches throughout the East End of London. He died on 1 December 1866 at Walwood House in Leytonstone.

== Family ==
In 1812 he married Sarah Lane, a daughter of Thomas Lane of Leyton Grange. Their son William Charles Cotton was a clergyman and apiarist; Sarah Acland did good works; another son was the eminent jurist Henry Cotton and his sixth child, Agnes Cotton, was a philanthropist.

One of his great-grandchildren was Clemence Margaret Acland, a nature photographer, ornithologist and researcher.

Government offices
Preceded by Sir John Henry Pelly	Governor of the Bank of England; 1842–1845	Succeeded by John Benjamin Heath
