= Leyton Grange =

Area of Leyton, London

Coordinates: 51.56425°N 0.01911°W

Leyton Grange, in Leyton, East London, is the second most deprived area of the London Borough of Waltham Forest. It include an estate that consists of a 10-storey tower and ten 4-storey courts owned by Forest Homes (see list below).

Leyton Grange is sited in an area of Waltham Forest that overlooks the marshes of the River Lea, East of the City of London. The Grange was the ancient manor house of Leyton, the name signifying that it was once owned by Stratford Abbey; the first record of it by that name is in 1470.

Huge ancient foundations, including arches of Roman appearance were recorded in 1718 at Grange Park Road, about 400m to the northeast of the Oliver Close Estate, with reports describing ancient ruins covering 2 acres. Many stray finds of Roman date have been recovered in the vicinity of Grange Park and Roman ditches were found to the north at Church Road.

One or more Roman buildings were found in 1718 in enlarging a garden on the north side of the parish churchyard. The property was then occupied by a Mr. Gansell and apparently called "The Grange"; it was described in 1771 as "between the manor house and the canal, where the garden now is," and the site is now somewhere in the neighbourhood of Grange Park and Manor Roads, .... The remains were traced over an extent of two acres, and consisted of "very large and strong foundations, in one place all stone with considerable arches, an arched doorway with steps down to it, but quite filled up with gravel. In many foundations were a great quantity of Roman tiles and bricks mixed with more modern materials." Two wells were also found, and "a great quantity of oak timber, some 8, some 10 inches square, mortised together like a floor." Numerous Roman coins, together with "bitts of silver with Saxon characters" were also turned up. A later account speaks of "a large arched gate with mouldings, and the portal to a large gate 9 or 10 feet high, 5 or 6 feet broad, the wall 4 feet thick or more," all at a depth of 6 feet. Foundations also occurred in the ploughed fields then adjoining the garden on the north and west, but nothing was observed on the south and east.

The house was rebuilt in 1720 in the Palladian style to the design of its owner, David Gansel. Leyton Grange was the seat of a branch of the Lane family from 1784 until 1861, when they sold it to the British Land Company who broke it up for development. From approximately 1824 until 1843 the Lanes leased the Grange to William Rhodes, grandfather of Cecil Rhodes. Leyton Grange Estate also has George Mitchell School a school that facilitates the needs of over 1000 students most commonly living in the surrounding area.

Transport

Transport in Leyton Grange Estate is advanced as it allows transportation through the 69 a new electric refurbished line of the TFL which takes you to Walthamstow Central and the 97 which takes you to Stratford.

It now contains a housing estate complex, comprising one 10-storey block and ten 4-storey courts.

- Slade Tower
- Sorenson Court
- Hammond Court
- Hinton Court
- Fitzgerald Court
- Eton Manor Court
- Clewer Court
- Cochrane Court
- Allanson Court
- Underwood Court
- Bechervaise Court

== Connections ==
Bus Routes 58 and 158 serve the estate.
