= William Cotton (missionary) =

Anglican priest, missionary and apiarist (1813–1879)

Reverend William Charles Cotton
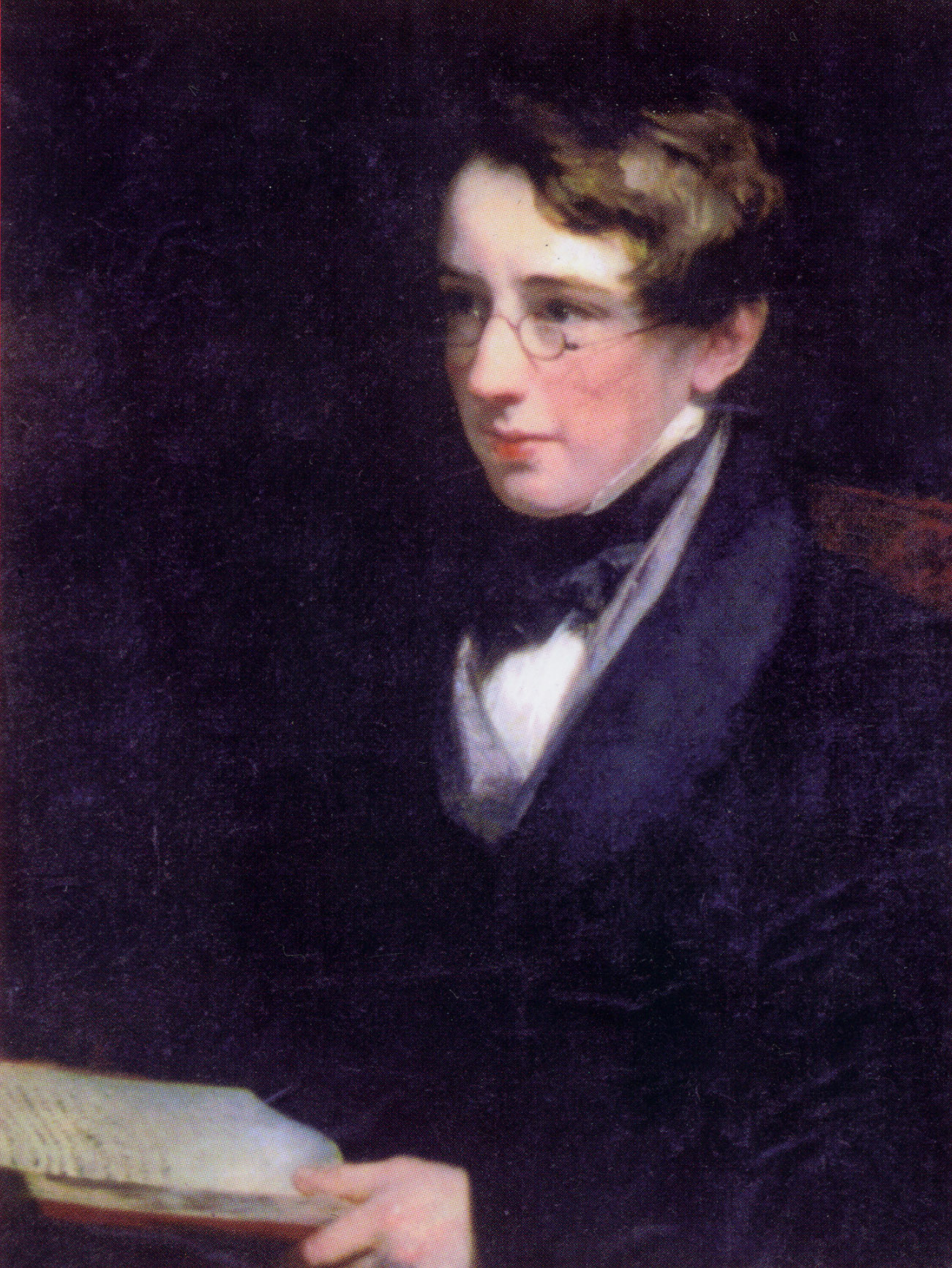
- Portrait of Cotton in 1832, aged about nineteen
- Born: 30 January 1813; Leytonstone, Essex, England
- Died: 22 June 1879 (aged 66); Chiswick, London, England
- Cause of death: "ascites and congestion of the brain"
- Resting place: St John the Baptist's Church, Leytonstone
- Education: Eton College; Christ Church, Oxford
- Occupations: priest, missionary and Beekeeper
- Parent(s): William and Sarah Cotton

William Charles Cotton (30 January 1813 – 22 June 1879) was an Anglican priest, a missionary and an apiarist. After education at Eton College and Christ Church, Oxford he was ordained and travelled to New Zealand as chaplain to George Augustus Selwyn, its first bishop. He introduced the skills of beekeeping to North Island and wrote books on the subject. Later as vicar of Frodsham, Cheshire, England, he restored its church and vicarage but was limited in his activities by mental illness.

== Early life ==
William Charles Cotton was born in Leytonstone, Essex, England, the eldest child of William Cotton and his wife Sarah. His father was a businessman who became Governor of the Bank of England. His younger brother was the jurist Henry Cotton.

He was initially educated at home by tutors, until at the age of 14 he was sent to Eton College. There he became an accomplished rower and had a fine scholastic record, winning the Newcastle Prize for excellence in divinity and the classics in his final year. In 1832 he matriculated to Christ Church, Oxford, and graduated BA in 1836, with first class honours in Classics and second class honours in Mathematics. He decided on a career in the church and was appointed as a curate at Baston, Lincolnshire. He was ordained as a deacon in 1837, in 1838 was promoted to MA by seniority, and in 1839 was ordained a priest and was appointed as curate at St Edward's Church, Romford, Essex. Even at this stage of his life, there were concerns about his mental health. He then moved to a curacy at the parish church of St John, Windsor. Here he became a good friend of George Augustus Selwyn, a fellow curate five years his senior.

== Missionary ==
In summer 1841 Selwyn was appointed to be the first Anglican Bishop of New Zealand and Cotton offered to go with him as his chaplain. This decision met with disapproval from Cotton's father who said "You are not missionary material". Cotton did have some of the practical skills which would be valuable; he could use various tools, including a lathe, ride a horse, and row and sail boats. The Tomatin sailed from London for Plymouth Sound without Cotton who went overland to Plymouth before eventually boarding the ship there. Cotton had loaded some hives of bees aboard but had not packed them securely within a hogshead as planned in My Bee Book. Delayed in the English Channel by contrary winds the bee hives were so thrown about aboard the Tomatin that they were jettisoned overboard in Plymouth Sound in Cotton's absence. The missionary party of 23 members set sail from Plymouth late on 26 December 1841 on board the barque Tomatin. On the ship, in addition to their luggage, were various animals and a second unknown number of hives of bees. The ship's captain from London refused Cotton permission to keep the hogshead on board so it was discarded on shore and Cotton was forced to house the hives as best he could. From Cotton's personal hand written note book, discovered languishing and unrecognized in a New Zealand book shop in 2015: “When however I arrived in Plymouth, the Tomatin was found to be so very full that Captain Nelson begged me to have the large barrel in which I had prepared to pack them [the hives], landed again. I did so and was sorry for it as I foresaw that my Bees would have but a poor chance of getting to their journeys end. The Hives were placed some in the jolly boat, some on the hay which was stowed on the quarter [deck]. ”Cotton's letter dated 30 December 1841, passed to a homeward bound brig on 21 January, stated the bees were safe. In his own hand Cotton revealed the fate of his bees: “the sailors were unfortunately so very fond of honey, that many of the Hives were turned up in the night, and the combs rudely pulled out. The Bees were kept confined for the first fortnight. But they seemed so uneasy at their confinement when we came into the warm latitudes that on a calm day I was induced to give them a fly. They hummed merrily about the poop, and in the evening all went back to their hives. Even when a gentle breeze sprung up, they seemed to have no ...” Unfortunately, the script of his note book ends in mid-sentence. The bees did not survive the trip to Sydney. Also on board was a Māori boy who taught many of the passengers, including Cotton, to speak the Māori language. In April 1842 the Tomatin arrived in Sydney. The boat was damaged by a rock on entering their landing place and, rather than wait for its repair, some of the party, including Selwyn and Cotton, set sail for New Zealand on the brig Bristolian on 19 May. They arrived in Auckland on 30 May. After spending some time as guests of Captain William Hobson, the first Governor of New Zealand, Selwyn and Cotton set sail for the Bay of Islands on the schooner Wave on 12 June, arriving on 20 June. Amongst the party was a clerk, William Bambridge, who was an accomplished artist and was later to become photographer to Queen Victoria.

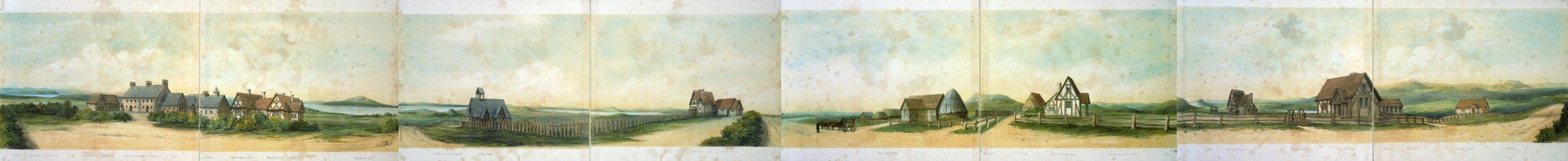
Panorama of St John's college, Tamaki, by Caroline Harriet Abraham: published in 1862 (was engraved by a sister of W.C. Cotton).

Selwyn had decided to set up residence at the Waimate Mission Station, some 15 miles (24 km) inland from Paihia where the Church Missionary Society had established a settlement 11 years earlier. On 5 July 1842 Selwyn set out on a six-month tour of his diocese leaving the Mission Station in the care of Sarah, his wife, and Cotton. While he was away Cotton was effectively the head of the mission, director of the college and minister at the church. By October 1843 more missionaries had arrived at Waimate and Cotton was able to accompany Bishop Selwyn on his second tour, this time to mission stations and native settlements in the southern part of North Island. Their journey was made partly by canoe but mainly by walking, often for large distances over difficult and dangerous terrain. Part way through the tour Selwyn decided to split the party into two sections with one section led by himself and the other by Cotton. After being away for nearly three months, Cotton arrived back at Waimate early in 1844 and Selwyn returned a few weeks later. Later in 1844 Selwyn decided to move some 160 miles (257 km) south to West Tamaki near Auckland where he bought 450 acres (1.8 km^{2}) of land, giving it the name of Bishop's Auckland. The party left on 23 October and arrived in Auckland on 17 November. During the first six months of 1845 Selwyn was away for much of the time and management of the settlement, and particularly the schools, fell to Cotton. Cotton continued to work in Bishop's Auckland particularly as headmaster of St John's College, and also with ecclesiastical duties and practical tasks. He finally left New Zealand in December 1847, together with Bambridge, arriving in England in May 1848.

== Apiarist ==
From his childhood Cotton had a passionate interest in bees and beekeeping. At Oxford University he was a founder and the first secretary of the Oxford Apiarian Society. In 1837 he published his first work about bees, A Short and Simple Letter to Cottagers from a Bee Preserver, which sold 24,000 copies. A second Letter followed three years later. In 1842 he published My Bee Book which amongst other advice suggested ways to render bees semiconscious to obtain the honey rather than by killing them.

New Zealand had two native species of bees but neither was suitable for producing honey. The first honey bees in New Zealand had been introduced by Mary Bumby, the sister of a Wesleyan minister, in March 1839. While Cotton was in Sydney in April 1842 he arranged for hives of bees to be sent to him after his arrival in New Zealand. This took longer than Cotton had expected and it was not until August 1843 that he received his first colony of honey bees at Waimate. When he moved to Bishop's Auckland he successfully transferred them. He spent much time in training settlers and Māori in the practices of keeping bees and gathering their honey. Towards the end of 1844 he published A Few Simple Rules for New Zealand Beekeepers. He later wrote a series of articles on beekeeping in The New Zealander and these were published together in 1848 as A Manual for New Zealand Beekeepers. Another book, written in Māori, Ko nga pi (The Bees) was published the following year. There is a tradition that Cotton introduced bees to New Zealand but this is incorrect, although he was largely responsible for teaching the skills of beekeeping to the immigrants and the natives.

When Cotton was later appointed vicar of Frodsham he continued his interest in beekeeping and carried out experiments on bees. On one of his trips to the Continent Cotton purchased a copy of a book called Schnurrdiburr by Wilhelm Busch which contained comical illustrated stories about a beekeeper and his bees. Cotton produced his own version of the book with his own verses attached to the illustrations entitled Buzz a Buzz or The Bees – Done freely into English. He took an active part in the discussions which led to the formation of the British Beekeepers' Association and became one of its vice presidents. He collected a library of over 200 books on bees and beekeeping which was bequeathed to the parish of Frodsham on his death. In 1932 it was deposited with the Ministry of Agriculture, Fisheries and Food, and in 1987 transferred to Reading University Library.

== Oxford ==
There is little information about the nine years following Cotton's return from New Zealand. He remained a Fellow of Christ Church, Oxford, but was in residence in the college only intermittently. He spent some of this time travelling on the Continent. In 1855 he was in Constantinople and in the summer of 1857 he visited Avignon and Paris. In December 1855 he was appointed as curate to St Mary Redcliffe, Bristol, a position from which he resigned in May 1857. While in Oxford he met Lewis Carroll, with whom he shared an interest in photography.

== Vicar of Frodsham ==
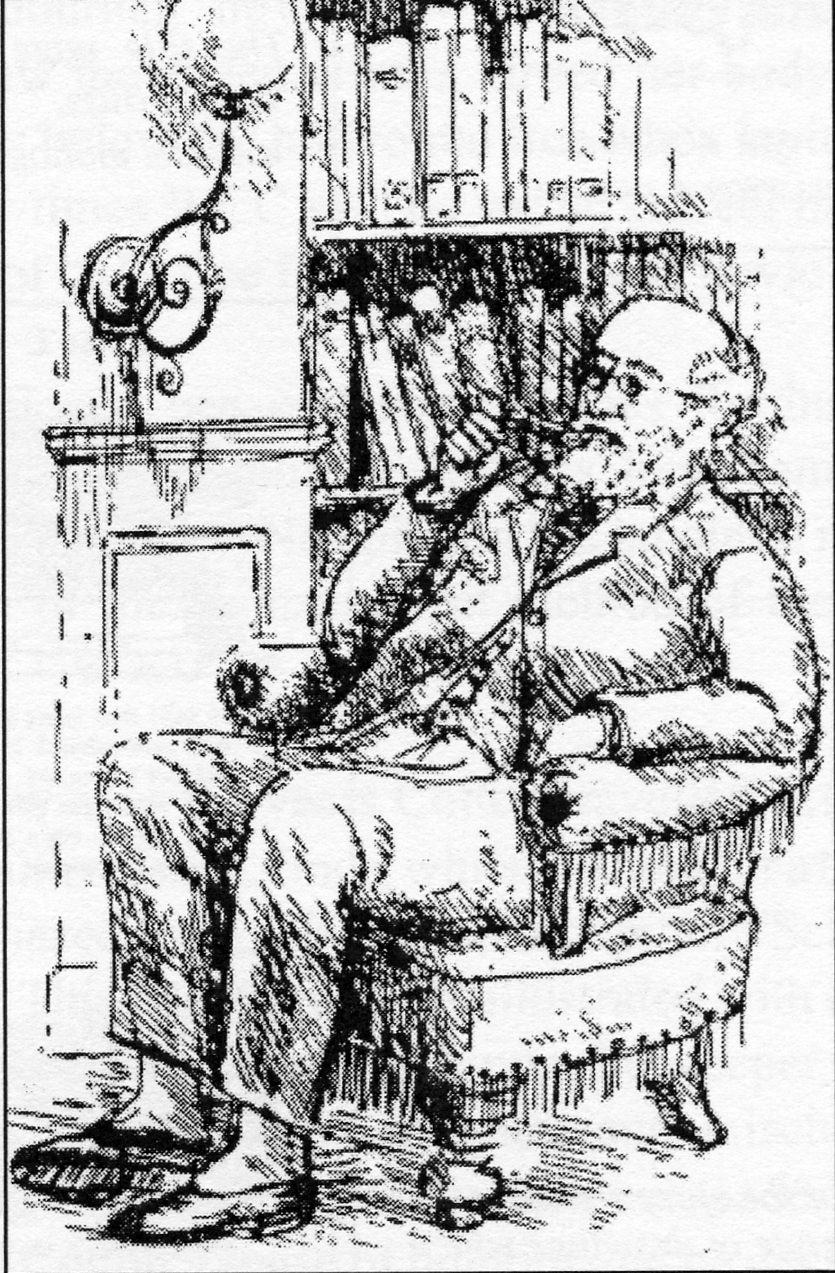
William Cotton in later life

In the summer of 1857 Cotton was appointed vicar of Frodsham, a market town in north Cheshire. At the time there were problems in the parish, in particular there was little financial provision for the outlying townships and the fabric of the parish church of St Laurence was in a bad condition. To make matters worse, the church stood in an elevated position above the town, making access difficult. Cotton sank into a state of apathy and despondence, and in the autumn of 1865 he was admitted for several weeks to Manor House Asylum, Chiswick, an asylum, under the care of Dr Seymour Tuke. There was some improvement in his mental condition and by 1870 Cotton was making arrangements for the restoration of the parish church. At this time there was competition from other denominations, particularly the Wesleyan Methodists. Financed by Thomas Hazlehurst, a member of the family business of Hazlehurst & Sons, soap and alkali manufacturers of nearby Runcorn, one small chapel had already been built near the parish church and another chapel, larger and more splendid, was planned for the centre of town. Cotton organised the building of a temporary chapel of ease in the middle of the town. This was constructed of iron (and known as the Iron Church) and was erected in a very short time on land donated by the Marquess of Cholmondeley. In addition to restoring the parish church, Cotton began to organise the restoration of the vicarage, in autumn 1872 hiring John Douglas to draw up plans. He also employed Douglas to design a house for him to live in while the vicarage was being renovated. Cotton successfully improved the provision of church schools in his parish. During his ministry he took boys from his parish to various events, both locally and to Manchester and Liverpool.

In the late 1870s Cotton's mental health began to deteriorate to such a degree that he became unable to carry out his duties. In 1879 a sequestration order was obtained to allow John Ashton to take charge of the affairs of the parish; Cotton was readmitted to Manor House in the early summer and died there in June. His funeral took place at St John the Baptist's Church in Leytonstone and he was buried in the family grave in the churchyard. On the same day a memorial service was held for him in his Frodsham church. A memorial to his memory is in Frodsham Parish Church. The symbol of the honey bee appears on the chain of office of Frodsham's mayor and in various other places in the town, a Frodsham street is named Maori Drive and a Māori inscription is still present on the doorstep of Cotton's Old Vicarage.

== Mental health ==
Cotton's achievements were limited by his poor mental health. Numerous references speak to Cotton's erratic behaviour, in particular his over-spending, and his periods of depression. He suffered from bipolar disorder, according to his biographer Smith who mentions his "manic depression". As he became older his condition deteriorated, but "he had occasional periods of effectiveness".
