= Andrews v Gas Meter Co =

British law case

Andrews v Gas Meter Company
- Court: Court of Appeal of England and Wales
- Citation: (1884) LR 25 Ch D 320

Case opinions
- Lindley LJ

Keywords
- Articles of association, special resolution, preferential shares

Andrews v Gas Meter Company (1884) LR 25 Ch D 320 is a UK company law case concerning the right of a company to amend its constitution to enable the issuing of preferential shares.

== Facts ==
The company, incorporated under the 1856 and then the 1862 Acts, had £60,000 of share capital, divided into 600 £100 shares, each subdivisible by five. Capital could be increased according to art 27 by the general meeting. New shares would be the same as old shares, and there was no mention of priority or preference shares. The company wished to buy a meter manufacturing business that was in administration from one John West, and wished to change its articles to allow preferential shares to be allotted to him, as part of the consideration for the deal. There would be 100 £100 shares, carrying a preferential dividend of £5 each.

== Judgment ==
Lindley LJ held that the company could issue the preferential shares. A company cannot deprive itself of the power to amend its articles by special resolution. He noted,

If, by declining to follow the second decision in Hutton v Scarborough Cliff Hotel Co, we were disturbing titles or embarrassing trade or commerce we should treat it as one of those decisions which, though wrong, it would be mischievous to overrule. But such is not the case; and it is desirable, from all points of view, to remove from companies a fetter which ought never to have been imposed upon them, and which in practice has been got rid of by skilled draftsmen by the insertion of power to issue preference shares in the original articles of association or the memorandum of association itself. These devices will no longer be necessary.

== See also ==
- UK company law
