= Hugh Sloane =

British hedge fund manager (born c. 1956)

- Born: c. 1956
- Education: University of Bristol; University of Oxford
- Occupation: Hedge fund manager
- Spouse: Kate
- Children: 2 daughters

Hugh Patrick Sloane (born March 1956) is a British hedge fund manager. He is the co-founder of Sloane Robinson, headquartered in the City of London.

== Early life ==
Hugh Sloane was born circa 1956. He graduated from the University of Bristol with a degree in Economics and Politics. He then received an MPhil in Economics from the University of Oxford.

== Career ==
Sloane started his career at GT Management (later merged with LGT Group) in Hong Kong in 1979. By 1991, he was the chairman of its European investment committee in London.

In 1993, with George Robinson, he co-founded Sloane Robinson, a hedge fund headquartered in the City of London.

As of 2015, he was worth an estimated GBP £185 million.

Sloane is an honorary fellow of Lincoln College, Oxford.

== Political activity ==
He made donations in excess of £600,000 to the Conservative Party from 2004 to 2015, including specific donations to MPs Charlotte Leslie, Angie Bray, Nicola Blackwood, and Alan Mak.

== Philanthropy ==
The 2002 Sloane Robinson Building at Keble College, Oxford bears his name, along with George Robinson.

In July 2017, Sloane together with the Sloane Robinson Foundation donated £10 million to the University of Bristol, towards its new Temple Quarter Enterprise Campus (TQEC).

== Personal life ==
He is married to Kate, they have two daughters who live in London, and as of 2019, live at Banks Fee, an 18th-century Cotswold-stone house in parkland in Longborough, Gloucestershire. Banks Fee is a grade II listed building.
