= H. B. Allen Centre =

Building in Oxford, England

H B Allen Centre

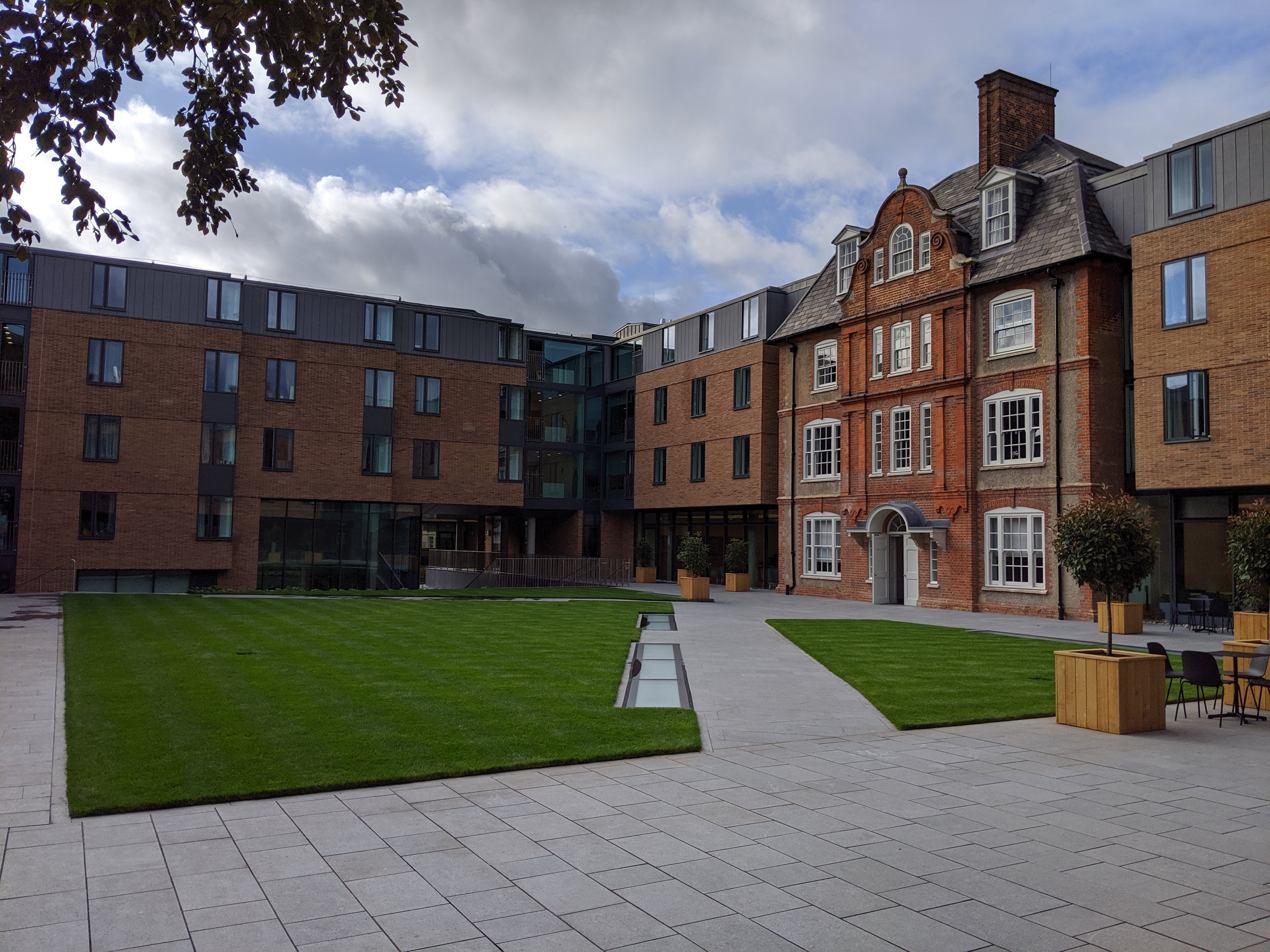
- The courtyard of the H B Allen Centre
- Interactive map of the H B Allen Centre area

General information
- Location: 25 Banbury Road, Oxford, United Kingdom
- Coordinates: 51.76097°N 1.26091°W
- Opened: 3 October 2019

Design and construction
- Architect: Rick Mather
- Architecture firm: MICA

The H B Allen Centre is the graduate centre of Keble College, one of the constituent colleges of the University of Oxford in England.

== Background ==
The H B Allen Centre is named for Heather Barbara "Mickie" Allen, founder of the H B Allen Charitable Trust. Ms. Allen was a descendant of the founder of Beefeater Gin, James Burrough, and also donated to RNLI for lifeboats in Padstow. The trust contributed a £25 million capital grant to assist with construction and fitting out of the new site.

== Construction ==
The centre was built on the site of the former Acland Hospital. Part of the old hospital, the Sarah Acland House, is a Grade II listed building, and a significant challenge in construction was preserving this structure.

The H B Allen Centre was officially opened on 3 October 2019 (a year behind schedule) by Prince William, Duke of Cambridge.

== Facilities ==
The centre includes accommodation for 230 full-time graduates, as well as common area including two multipurpose rooms, laundry facilities, a gym, a café, and lecture theatre.
