= Rick Mather =

American architect (1937–2013)

- Born: May 30, 1937
- Died: April 20, 2013 (aged 75)
- Education: University of Oregon
- Occupation: Architect
- Awards: Royal Institute of British Architects 2008, RIBA 2011

Rick Mather (May 30, 1937 – April 20, 2013) was an American-born architect working in England. Born in Portland, Oregon and awarded a B.arch. at the University of Oregon in 1961, he came to London in 1963 and worked at the architectural firm Lyons Israel Ellis for two years. He became a leading figure at the Architectural Association in the 1970s, and in 1973 founded his own practice, Rick Mather Architects.

== Rick Mather Architects ==
Mather set up his own practice, Rick Mather Architects, in 1973. The partners at Rick Mather Architects Gavin Miller and Stuart Cade have since launched a new practice MICA, which will complete the remaining RMA projects, whilst simultaneously working on its own strategic masterplans, buildings and landscapes.

== Style ==
Mather was respected for his carefully considered approach and his innovation in low energy design. His style is reflected in many award-winning buildings, both in the UK and abroad. Characteristics of his buildings include extensive use of structural glass and natural lighting of interior spaces, respect for existing buildings, and sustainability.

== Work ==
Mather oversaw many significant buildings, including the Ashmolean Museum, Keble College, Dulwich Picture Gallery, together with the masterplan for London’s Southbank Centre. His built projects include:

- School of Education and Information Systems (1980, now housing School of Education and Norwich Business School), Climatic Research Unit (1988; RIBA Award) and development plan for the campus, University of East Anglia.
- The Times headquarters, London Docklands (1991).
- Series of restaurants for the Zen chain in London, Hong Kong and Montreal (1985-1991).
- Technology Tower, London Metropolitan University (2000).
- Masterplan for Southbank Centre, London (2000 to date).
- Arco Building (1995; RIBA Award, Civic Trust Award, British Construction Award), Sloane-Robinson Building including the O'Reilly Theatre (2002; RIBA Award, Civic Trust Award, Brick Award, Oxford Preservation Trust Award) and H. B. Allen Centre building (former Acland Hospital site, 2016–18) at Keble College, Oxford.
- Master plan, Gower Building (1997) and Jubilee Sports Centre (2004) for Highfield Campus of University of Southampton.
- Klein House, Hampstead (1998; RIBA Award and runner-up for Stirling Prize).

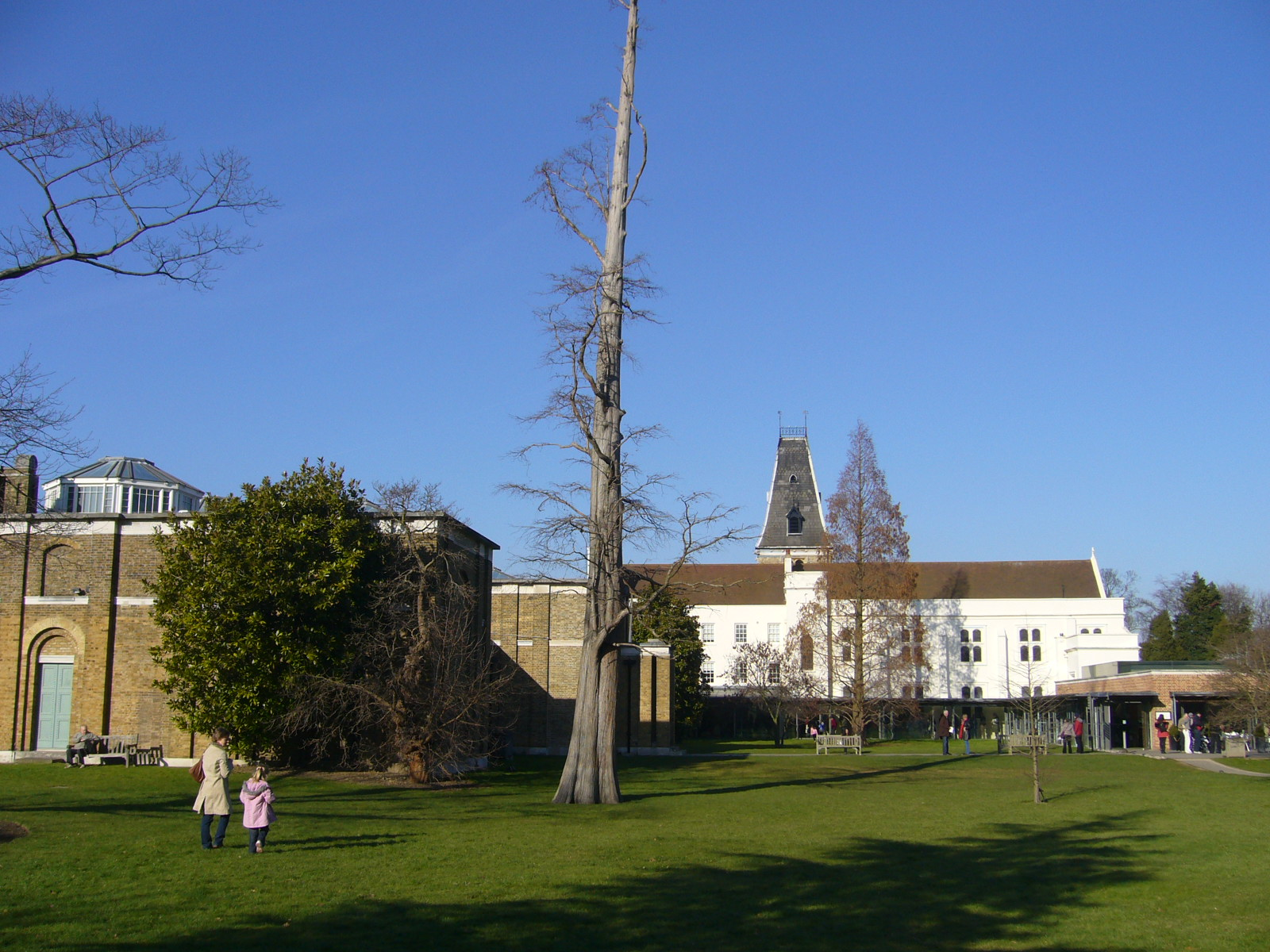
Dulwich Picture Gallery showing extensions

- Extension and refurbishment of Dulwich Picture Gallery, London (1999; RIBA Award, Civic Trust Award, AIA Award).
- ISMA Centre for the University of Reading (1999; RIBA Award, Civic Trust Award)

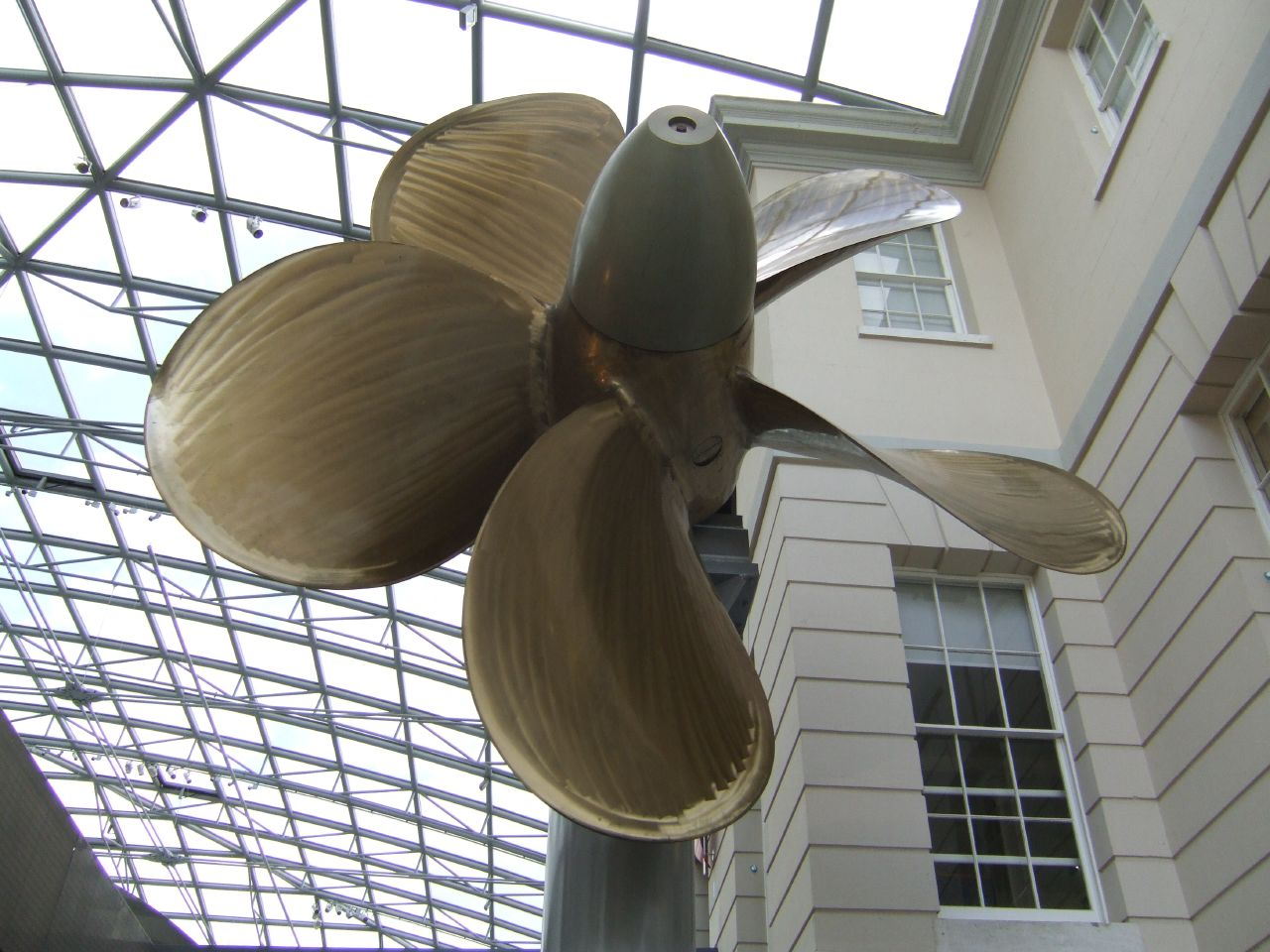
In Neptune Court, National Maritime Museum.

- Wallace Collection Centenary Project, London (2000).
- New galleries and refurbishment for National Maritime Museum, Greenwich (1995-9; Civic Trust Award) and Masterplan for Maritime Greenwich World Heritage Site landscape (1998–2003).
- School of Architecture, University of Lincoln, Brayford campus (2003; RIBA Award, Shortlisted for the Prime Ministers Award for Better Public Buildings).
- Lyric Theatre Hammersmith (2004).
- Towner Gallery, Eastbourne (2005-9; RIBA Award, British Design Award, Sussex Heritage Trust Award)

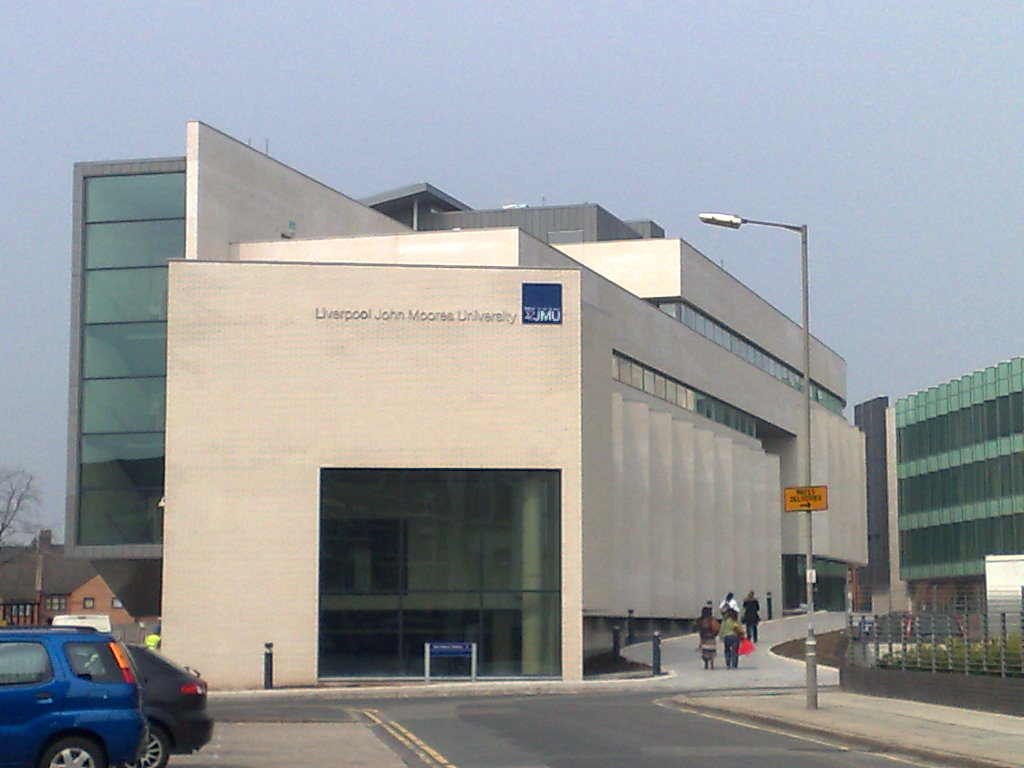
Liverpool John Moores University Art and Design Academy

- Art and Design Academy, Liverpool John Moores University (2008; RIBA Award).
- Ashmolean Museum Masterplan and Expansion Ashmolean, Oxford (2009; RIBA Award, Shortlisted for the Stirling Prize 2010, Building - Project of the Year Award).
- Stowe School Masterplan (2001-2020) and Girls' Boarding Houses (2008; RIBA Award).
- Barking Town Centre London Road Masterplan
- Central Milton Keynes Residential Quarter
- Corpus Christi College Auditorium, Oxford, Oxford (2009; RIBA Award).
- Sunken library extension, The Queen's College, Oxford (2006–17).
- East Range, Mansfield College, Oxford (2014).
- Campus wide masterplan and expansion of the Virginia Museum of Fine Arts, Richmond, Virginia US (2010). (RIBA Winner 2011).
- James Allen's Community Music Centre (RIBA Competition Winner 2008).
- North Harlow Masterplan (2010-).
- Barking Skills Centre (2009-).
- South Kilburn residential development, Brent, London (2009-)
- Chester Balmore residential development, Camden, London (2010-)
