= Northeastern University – London =

University in London, England

- Type: Undergraduate, postgraduate
- Established: Incorporated 2010; announced 2011; offering tuition from September 2012
- Founder: A. C. Grayling
- Parent institution: Northeastern University
- Endowment: None (2024)
- Budget: £62.6 million (2023/24)
- Chief Executive Officer: Rob Farquharson (CEO)
- Academic staff: 180 (2024/25)
- Administrative staff: 0 180 (2024/25)
- Students: 1,060 (2024/25); 820 FTE (2024/25)
- Undergraduates: 675 (2024/25)
- Postgraduates: 385 (2024/25)
- Location: London, United Kingdom; 51°30′22″N 0°4′17″W
- Website: nulondon.ac.uk

Northeastern University – London is a public university in London, England. It was founded in 2010 as New College of the Humanities by the philosopher A. C. Grayling, who became its first Master. The college originally specialised in the humanities, social sciences, and master's degrees at the intersection of the humanities and technology. In February 2019 the college was acquired by Northeastern University, a private American research university based in Boston, Massachusetts, and rebranded as NCH at Northeastern. A year later, in February 2020, NCH at Northeastern was granted its own taught degree awarding powers. It was awarded university title and changed its name to "Northeastern University – London" after regulatory approval by the Office for Students in July 2022.

The university's campus is located in the St Katharine Docks area of London.

== History ==
=== Foundation ===
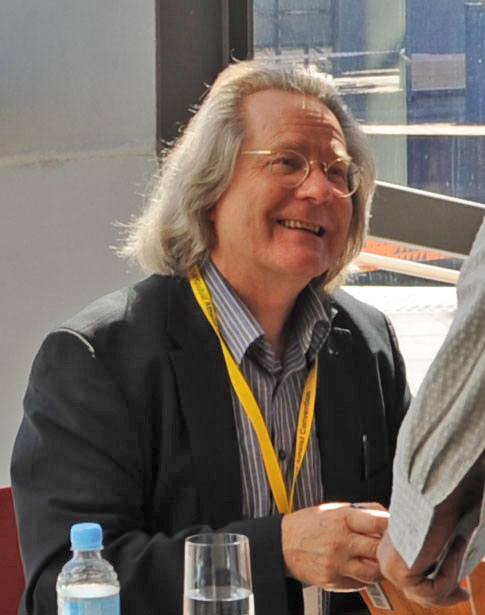
A. C. Grayling, professor of philosophy at Birkbeck College until June 2011, secured NCH's initial funding

The foundation of the college was announced in 2011 under the leadership of A. C. Grayling, with education based around an Oxbridge-like tutorial system and fees of £18,000 a year. Initial reports said that it aimed to offer an education to rival that of Oxford and Cambridge, but Grayling said this had been blown out of proportion by press hyperbole. He said he had the idea for the college years ago when he was admissions tutor for St Anne's College, Oxford, and the university was turning down twelve good interviewees for every successful one.

Grayling argued that there was not enough elite university provision in the United Kingdom, leading thousands of British students to study in the United States instead. He told The Independent that the headmaster of Winchester College, an independent secondary school, had said many of his best students failed to get into Oxbridge because of government pressure to increase the number of students from state schools. He also criticised English state examinations, arguing that A-levels do not adequately measure ability.

Grayling said David Willetts, the universities minister, was told of the project in 2010, and appeared enthusiastic. NCH Limited was first named Grayling Hall Limited (after A. C. Grayling and Peter Hall), incorporated in July 2010 and registered at an address in Peckham, south London. The name was changed to New College of the Humanities in February 2011.

Initial "seed capital" of £200,000 for the project was provided, according to British newspaper The Guardian, by the financier Peter Hall. £10 million in private equity funding was subsequently raised to cover costs for two years, with the expectation that NCH would break even by the third. Cavendish Corporate Finance LLP were the corporate financiers hired by NCH Ltd. and raised this £10 million from a range of private investors including a number of prominent individuals from the world of business and finance.

=== Reception ===
The college's founding attracted a substantial response in the UK, where most higher education institutions are publicly funded, and a significant amount of adverse publicity. There was an angry reaction from sections of the academic community. Complaints included that NCH had copied the course descriptions of the University of London's international programmes on its website; was offering the same syllabus with a significantly higher price tag; and that the senior academics involved with the project would in fact do very little of the teaching. Academics were also opposed to the college's for-profit structure and high tuition fees. Literary critic Terry Eagleton called the college "odious", arguing that it was taking advantage of a crumbling university system to make money; Grayling responded that Eagleton himself teaches a few weeks a year at the University of Notre Dame in Indiana, USA, a private – though non-profit – university. Lawyer David Allen Green, writing in the New Statesman, described NCH as a "sham" and a "branding exercise with purchased celebrity endorsements and a PR-driven website." Several academics complained in a letter to The Guardian that its creation was a setback for the campaign against the current government's policy of commercialising education, and were joined by 34 of Grayling's former colleagues at Birkbeck, who questioned how much teaching the college's 14 academic partners would actually do. Terence Kealey, then Vice-Chancellor of the University of Buckingham, suggested it was dangerous to have a university funded by private equity, citing the possible collapse in 2011 of Southern Cross private nursing homes.

However, Britain's former prime minister Tony Blair endorsed the college; and London's mayor, Boris Johnson, called it the boldest experiment in higher education in the UK since the foundation in 1983 of the University of Buckingham, the UK's first private university; he wrote that it showed the way ahead for academics demoralised by government interference with admissions procedures and "scapegoated for the weaknesses of the schools." The Times argued that higher education has been a closed shop in the UK for too long, that all over the world there are excellent universities run independently of the state, and that in its conception NCH is teaching by example. The Economist wrote that there is a market for the idea because of the increasing number of qualified British students who fail to get into their university of choice, in part because of pressure on the top universities from the Office for Fair Access to increase the number of students from state schools; they added that "a 'toffs’ college' of well-heeled Oxbridge near-misses is a provocative concept." The Harvard historian Niall Ferguson, one of the college's partners, said he had read the criticism of NCH with incredulity: "Anyone who cares about the humanities will be cheering Anthony Grayling." Toby Young argued in The Daily Telegraph that the reaction was part of a left-wing campaign to retain state control over education, involving, he wrote, public sector unions, university lecturers, and the Socialist Workers Party. Simon Jenkins wrote that the country's professors, lecturers and student trade unionists were "united in arms against what they most hate and fear: academic celebrity, student fees, profit and loss, one-to-one tutorials and America."

Grayling responded to the criticism by arguing that NCH was trying to keep humanities teaching alive. He said he felt persecuted by the negative reaction: "My whole record, everything I have written, is turned on its head. Now I am a bastard capitalist. It is really upsetting. ... Education is a public good and we should be spending more on it and it shouldn't be necessary to do this, but standing on the sidelines moaning and wailing is not an option." In a 2012 interview, Grayling also responded to claims that the college was "elitist": "There is nothing wrong with being elite as long as you are not exclusive. You want your surgeon or airline pilot to have been trained at an elite institution."

A dozen protesters heckled Grayling at Foyles bookshop in London on 7 June 2011 during a debate about cuts to arts funding, one of them shouting that he had "no right to speak." A protester let off a smoke bomb, and 100 people were evacuated from the store. Later in the week police removed protesters from a British Humanist Association talk by Richard Dawkins at the Institute of Education.

The warden of New College, Oxford, asked Grayling to change his college's name in 2011 to prevent confusion with the Oxford college. New College, Oxford subsequently trademarked its name. In January 2012, the UK's Intellectual Property Office objected to the college name being registered as a trademark because of possible confusion with New College, Oxford. The college withdrew the application, and later successfully registered their logo as NCH New College of the Humanities.

=== Development ===
The first cohort consisted of around 60 students, primarily from private schools; one in five of the college's offers have gone to state-school students. College staff made 130 visits to schools (21 to state schools) to attract applications. They graduated in 2015.

From September 2012 to September 2015, it offered tuition in economics, English, history, law and philosophy and politics and international relations for undergraduate degrees with the University of London International Programme. From 2015 it ran its own degree programmes, validated by Southampton Solent University. Its "Diploma of New College of the Humanities" is earned alongside the various combined BA and BSc degrees by completion of courses in applied ethics, critical reasoning, science literacy and LAUNCH, its professional development programme.

In 2016 NCH announced that it would be offering its first postgraduate qualification from that September, an MA in historical research and public history validated by Swansea University. In 2017 the college launched three additional master's degrees, the MA Economic Policy & Communication, MSc Global Politics, and MA Philosophy.

In 2018, Northeastern University, a private US institution, announced that it planned to acquire the college. The take-over went ahead in 2019, with the college being renamed NCH at Northeastern. The Provost of Northeastern, who had responsibility for overseas campuses, stated that she thought the UK higher education market had opportunities for an innovation in apprenticeships and lifelong learning that could provide future growth for the college, along with an expansion of the curriculum from its liberal arts focus to become more multi-disciplinary.

In February 2020, NCH was awarded renewable taught degree awarding powers for an initial period of six years. In August 2020 these became indefinite after NCH was registered by the Office for Students as a publicly funded higher education provider, and was registered as a charity. Following the award of indefinite degree awarding powers, NCH announced in 2021 that it would seek university status and permission to use the name Northeastern University – London. This was granted in July 2022.

== Campus ==
The college was initially based in a building called The Registry in Bedford Square, Bloomsbury. Since August 2021, it has been based at Devon House, St Katharine Docks, London. Students have access to the Northeastern University – London collection at Devon House, Northeastern University's online library resources and the University of London's Senate House Library. It block-books rooms for its first-year students with student accommodation providers.

== Academic profile ==
=== Courses ===
The university offers undergraduate degrees in business, data science, economics, English, history, law, philosophy, politics, psychology, and computer science. It offers master's degrees in artificial intelligence, ethics, data science, creative writing, politics, sustainability, investment banking and project management. It also offers integrated apprenticeship degrees in the area of digital transformation.

=== Teaching ===
Northeastern University – London holds an overall bronze award in the Teaching Excellence Framework, with bronze in both categories of student experience and student outcomes.

=== Fees ===
The university's annual fees for home students, as of 2023, are £9,250.

== Notable staff ==
- Simon Blackburn, professor
- Vernon Bogdanor, professor of politics
- Richard Dawkins, professor
- A. C. Grayling, Master
- Christopher Peacocke, visiting professor
- Steven Pinker, visiting professor
- Jaya Savige, lecturer in English and head of creative writing
- Peter Singer, professor

== See also ==
- BPP University College of Professional Studies
- Education in England
- Higher Education Act 2004
- Regent's University London
- London Interdisciplinary School
