= George Robinson (hedge fund manager) =

British hedge fund manager

- Born: November 1956 (age 69); Hampstead, London, England
- Other name: George Edward Silvanus Robinson
- Education: Eton College
- Alma mater: Keble College, Oxford
- Occupations: Hedge fund manager, media proprietor, philanthropist
- Known for: Sloane Robinson
- Children: 3 children

George Edward Silvanus Robinson (born November 1956) is a British hedge fund manager, media proprietor, and philanthropist. He is the co-founder of Sloane Robinson, a hedge fund headquartered in the City of London.

== Early life ==
George Robinson was born in November 1956, in Hampstead, London. He was a King's Scholar at Eton College (1970–1974). He matriculated at Keble College, a constituent college of the University of Oxford, in 1975, gaining a BA degree in Engineering Science in 1979.

== Career ==
Robinson started his career at the Swire Group in Hong Kong. He then worked at Cathay Pacific, an airline partially owned by the Swire Group. In 1985, he joined W. I. Carr as their researcher on Korean Stock Exchange companies, working in Seoul, then moved on to Bangkok, Thailand, still working for Carr, to report on companies listed on the Stock Exchange of Thailand. In 1991, he became Carr's Director of Research in Hong Kong and China.

In 1993, with Hugh Sloane, Robinson co-founded Sloane Robinson, a hedge fund with its headquarters in the City of London. He was still a Director in 2012. He also serves on the advisory board of Cerno Capital.

In 2008, Robinson and fellow financier Peter Hall, each acquired 26% of Prospect, a British political affairs magazine, from Derek Coombs. As a result, Hall and Robinson jointly had a controlling stake in the magazine. They later sold it, and Prospect is now owned by the Resolution Foundation.

Robinson was worth an estimated £220 million in 2008. As of 2015, the figure was £185 million.

== Philanthropy ==
He has made charitable contributions to his alma mater, Keble College, where he chairs a fundraising campaign known as the "2020 Campaign." and he is as an Honorary Fellow. He also serves on the Investment Committees of Eton College.

He serves on the board of trustees of the Policy Exchange, a think tank based in Westminster.

The 2002 Sloane Robinson Building at Keble College, Oxford bears his name, along with Hugh Sloane.

== Political activity ==
He is a major donor to the Conservative Party. From 2004 to 2015, he donated in excess of £400,000 to the party.
