= Sloane Robinson Building =

Building with a studio theatre in Oxford, England

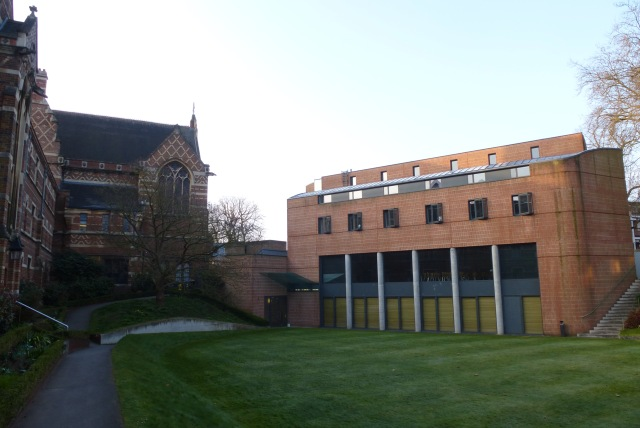
- View of the Sloane Robinson Building which houses the O'Reilly Theatre

General information
- Location: Keble College, Blackhall Road, Oxford OX1 3PG, United Kingdom
- Coordinates: 51.7587°N 1.2587°W
- Year built: 1996–2002
- Construction started: 1996
- Completed: 2002
- Cost: £6.5 million
- Owner: Keble College, Oxford

Technical details
- Material: Brick
- Floor count: 6
- Floor area: 2,600m^{2}

Design and construction
- Architecture firm: Rick Mather Architects

O'Reilly Theatre
- Interactive map of O'Reilly Theatre
- Full name: Keble O'Reilly Theatre
- Address: Keble College, Blackhall Road, Oxford OX1 3PG, United Kingdom
- Capacity: 250

Construction
- Opened: 2002
- Architect: Theatreplan

Website
- oreillytheatre.co.uk

The Sloane Robinson Building is a building in the Newman Quad at Keble College, one of the University of Oxford colleges. The building is in brick, reflecting the adjacent Victorian Grade I listed buildings by William Butterfield.

The building was designed by Rick Mather Architects during 1996–2002. Theatreplan designed O'Reilly Theatre within the building, in collaboration with Rick Mather Architects, at a cost of £1.2 million. The building also includes various meeting rooms. The building is thermally connected to the ground through water circulating via the pilings in the foundations, thus reducing the building's cooling and heating needs. The six-storey building includes extensive structural glass work, with an entrance canopy that uses cantilever glass beams supported on bearings in the external wall.

The overall building project won the following awards:

2003

- Brick Awards Building of the Year
- Brick Awards Best Public Building
- Oxford Preservation Trust Environmental Award

2004

- RIBA Award

2005

- Civic Trust Award – Commendation

The building is named after the hedge fund Sloane Robinson, established by Hugh Sloane and George Robinson, both alumni of the University of Oxford. Robinson was a student at Keble College itself.

== O'Reilly Theatre ==
The O'Reilly Theatre is a flexible studio theatre located within the Sloane Robinson Building at Keble College. The theatre was completed in 2002.

The seating capacity of the space ranges from 128 to 250, depending on the setup chosen. The standard configuration is end-on, but alternatives include traverse and in-the-round. The theatre is named after Sir Tony O'Reilly, the billionaire Irish businessman and former international rugby union player, who contributed most of the funds.

=== Performances ===
The Theatre is managed by the Martin Esslin Society, who are responsible for choosing the productions staged in the theatre each term. Talks are also given by well-known actors.

2018

- Twelfth Night (January 17 – January 20)
- The 39 Steps (January 31 – February 3)
- Oxford Alternotives (March 7)

2020

- The Entertainer (February 6 – February 10)

Other

Further performances have also taken place. Performances are often reviewed in the Oxford Mail newspaper.
