= Blackhall Road, Oxford =

Road in central Oxford, England

Coordinates: 51.7585°N 1.2585°W

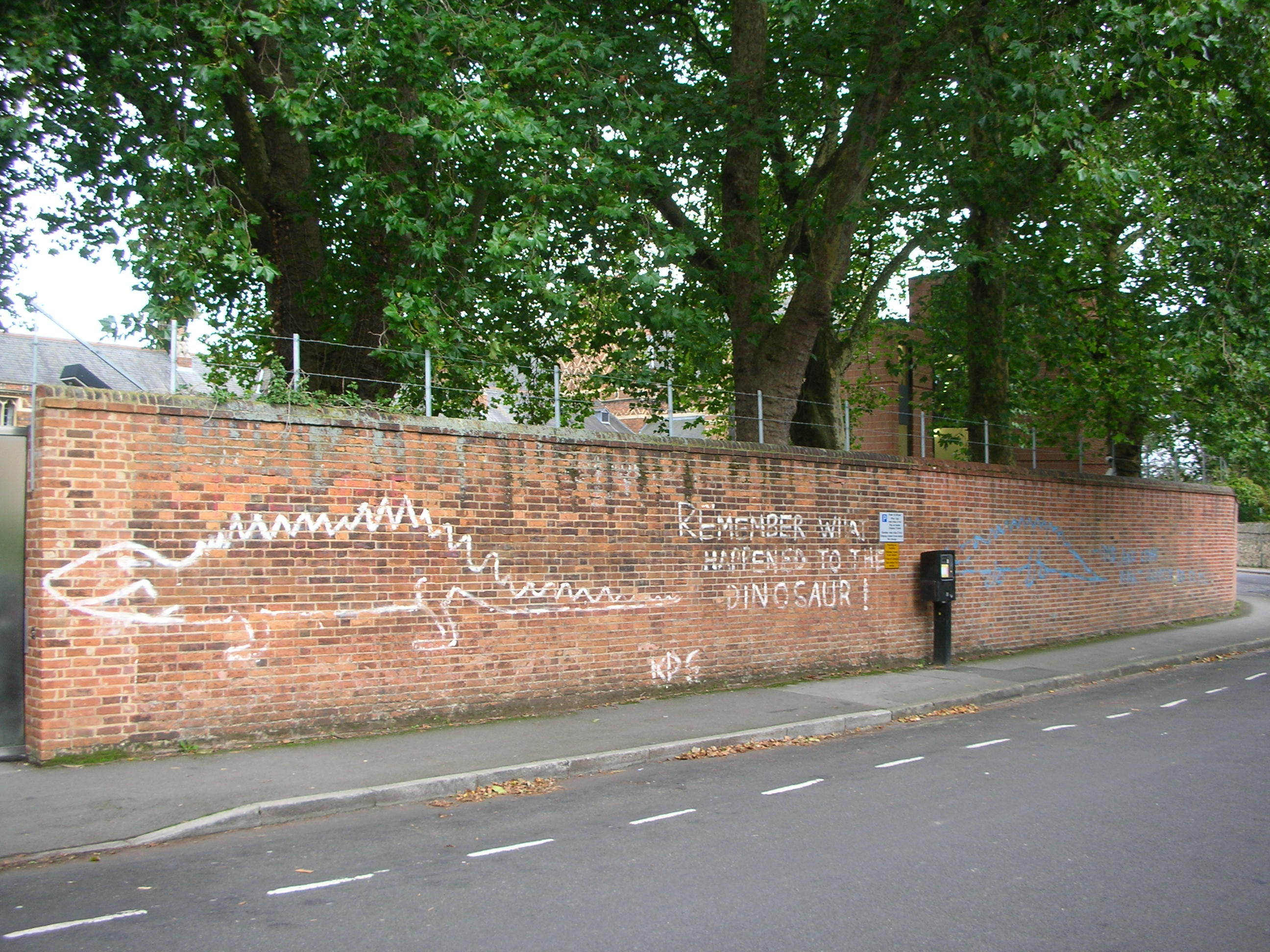
Dinosaur graffiti in Blackhall Road, Oxford, in October 2006

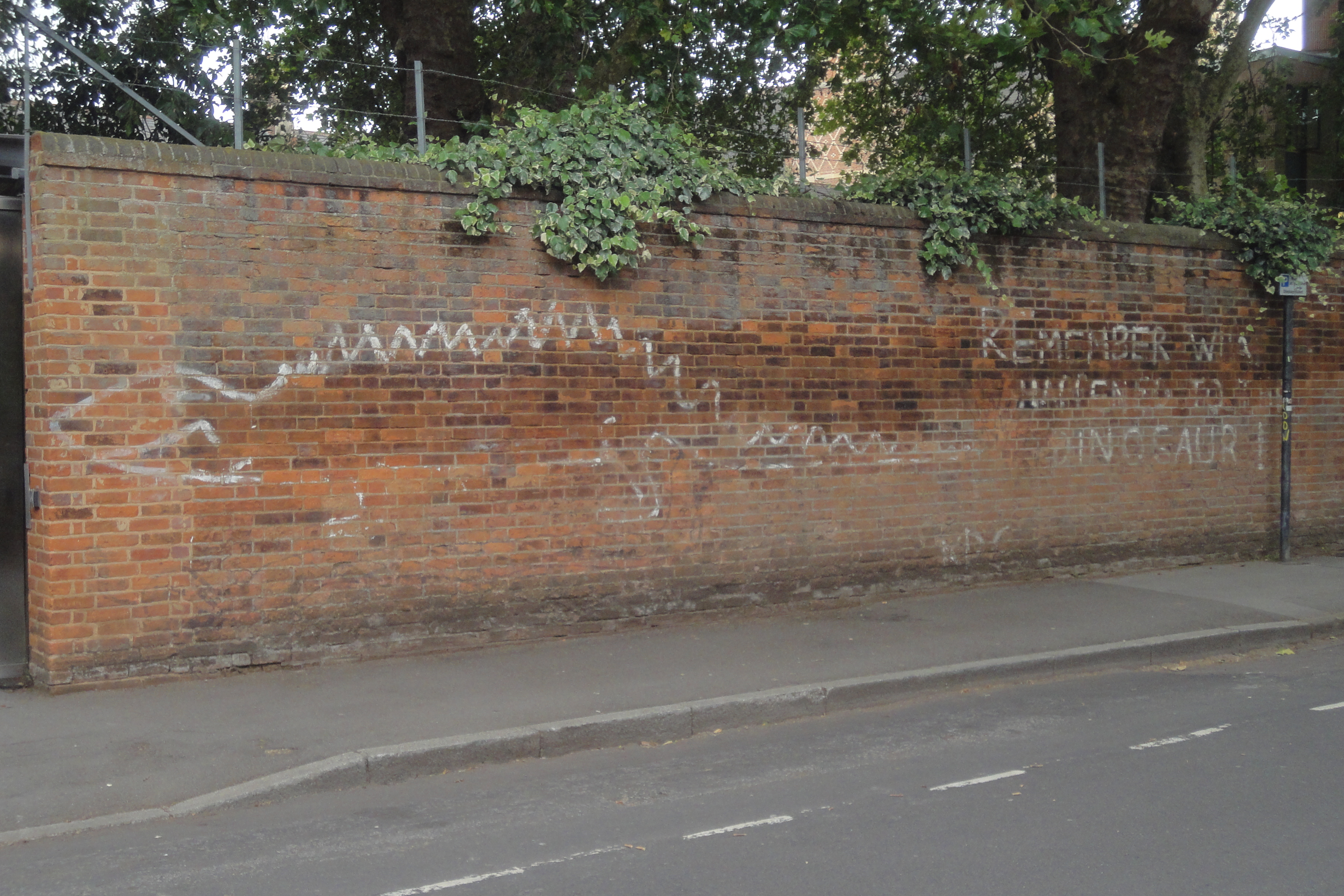
The same graffiti in July 2019.

Blackhall Road is a road running between Keble Road to the north and Museum Road to the south in central Oxford, England, dating from the late 19th century. It is named after Black Hall, dating from at least 1519, fronting onto St Giles', and now part of St John's College. Houses in the road were leased by St John's College in 1865–75.

Keble College occupies the entire east side of the road, including the O'Reilly Theatre. In the 1970s, the architects Ahrends, Burton and Koralek designed yellow brick buildings on the southern part of Blackhall Road. These include the "Elephant House" at the southern end, nicknamed due to its resemblance to the elephant house at London Zoo.

At the southern end on the west side are houses owned by St John's College. At the northern end to the west is the Department of Statistics of the University of Oxford, until 2013 the Mathematical Institute.

The historian J. K. Fotheringham (1874–1936), an expert on ancient astronomy and chronology, and Fellow of Magdalen College, lived at 6 Blackhall Road. The classical historian Abel Hendy Jones Greenidge lived at 4 Blackhall Road. The poet and art critic Hasan Shahid Suhrawardy (1890–1965), an associate of the writer D. H. Lawrence, also lived in the road when they met in 1915.

The road includes one of the longest lasting and still extant pieces of outdoor graffiti in Oxford. On a brick wall forming part of Keble College, opposite the Department of Statistics building, are two large dinosaurs in white and blue paint. The caption "REMEMBER WHAT HAPPENED TO THE DINOSAUR!" is next to the white dinosaur. By the blue dinosaur, perhaps intended to resemble an alligator, is a riposte "I DID, AND LOOK WHAT HAPPENED TO ME".

It is thought that the white graffiti, the earlier of the two, was the work of delegates at the Drapers' Conference at Keble in the early 1970s and was a reply to the students of Keble's neighbour St John's College who had formed the St John’s Destroy Keble Society. An alternative version suggests that students from Wadham and Somerville Colleges were responsible. Close by in Parks Road is the Oxford University Museum of Natural History where a number of fossilized dinosaur skeletons can be seen. There was a hatching-dinosaur-egg addition on the wall for a while but it has disappeared.
