= Peter Hall (financier) =

Australian financier (born 1960)

Peter Hall AM
- Born: 9 October 1960 (age 66); Bangkok, Thailand
- Education: Bedales School; University of Sydney
- Occupation: Financier
- Children: 1

Peter Hall is a London-based Australian financier, media proprietor and philanthropist. He is the founder, executive chairman and former Chief Investment Officer at investment firm, Hunter Hall Investment Management. He formerly owned stakes in Prospect and Monocle, two London based magazines.

== Early life ==
Hall was born in 1960 in Bangkok, Thailand. His father was a journalist and diplomat from New Zealand. As a result, he lived in Pakistan with his family when he was five years old. He also lived in Canada, France and England. His uncle Edwin Arnold Earnshaw worked for News Corporation from 1964.

He was educated at Bedales School, a boarding school in Hampshire, England. He graduated from the University of Sydney, where he received an Arts degree.

== Career ==
Hall started his career as a journalist for Fairfax Media.

He embarked upon a career in finance, and served as Investment Manager at HGL Limited, Portfolio Manager and Analyst at Mercantile Mutual, Industrial Analyst at Pembroke Securitie, Investment Analyst at New Zealand South British Insurance. He credits Warren Buffett's writings as an inspiration for his career path.

In 1993, he founded Hunter Hall Investment Management, an investment firm which focuses on "ethical investing", with just AUS$1 million. It now has from AUS$1.1 billion, and employs 30 people. Hall previously served as its Executive chairman and Chief Investment Officer, and owns 47% of the firm. In December 2016, Hall abruptly resigned his role as CIO (no mention was made of his role as CEO or COO).

In 2008, with fellow financier George Robinson, he acquired 26% of Prospect, a British magazine of political affairs, from Derek Coombs. As a result, both Hall and Robinson had a controlling stake in the magazine. Moreover, Hall was a founding shareholder of Monocle, a global affairs and lifestyle magazine, but has since sold his stake.

In 2005, Hall, along with James Gurnsey and Cameron McClure, founded Flat White café in Berwick Street, Soho, which was the first of the third wave independent cafes to introduce Antipodean-style coffee, and especially the eponymous Flat White, to London and Europe. He also owns Milk Bar in Bateman Street, Soho.

== Philanthropy ==
He was a founder of the Sydney Rainforest Action Group and the London Committee for the Abolition of Whaling. He serves on the board of directors of the International Rhino Foundation. He is also a Patron of the Asian Rhino Project. He has made charitable contributions in excess of AUS$8 million to the Whale and Dolphin Conservation Society, Greenpeace, the Sea Shepherd Conservation Society, the Dian Fossey Gorilla Fund, the Wild Camel Protection Society, Save International, Voiceless, the Great Ape Project and the Free the Bears Fund. He has been named a "Business Visionary" by Compassion in World Farming, a campaigning and lobbying animal welfare organisation based in England. Moreover, he does not eat meat on Mondays for ethical reasons.

He served on the Council of the Sydney Film Festival and the Bedales Grants Trust Fund, which benefits his alma mater, Bedales School. He is a patron of CleanupUK, a non-profit organisation which encourages volunteers to pick up litter in England whose president is Camilla, Duchess of Cornwall.

He became a Member of the Order of Australia for his philanthropic endeavours in 2010.

== Political activism ==
He is a donor to the Conservative Party, having donated in excess of £100,000 from 2010 to 2015, and £500,000 prior to the 2010 election. In April 2015, he criticised Prime Minister David Cameron's leadership and called for Boris Johnson to become the next leader of the party, if David Cameron lost the election. However, shortly after making the comments, Hall apologised.
