= Acland Hospital =

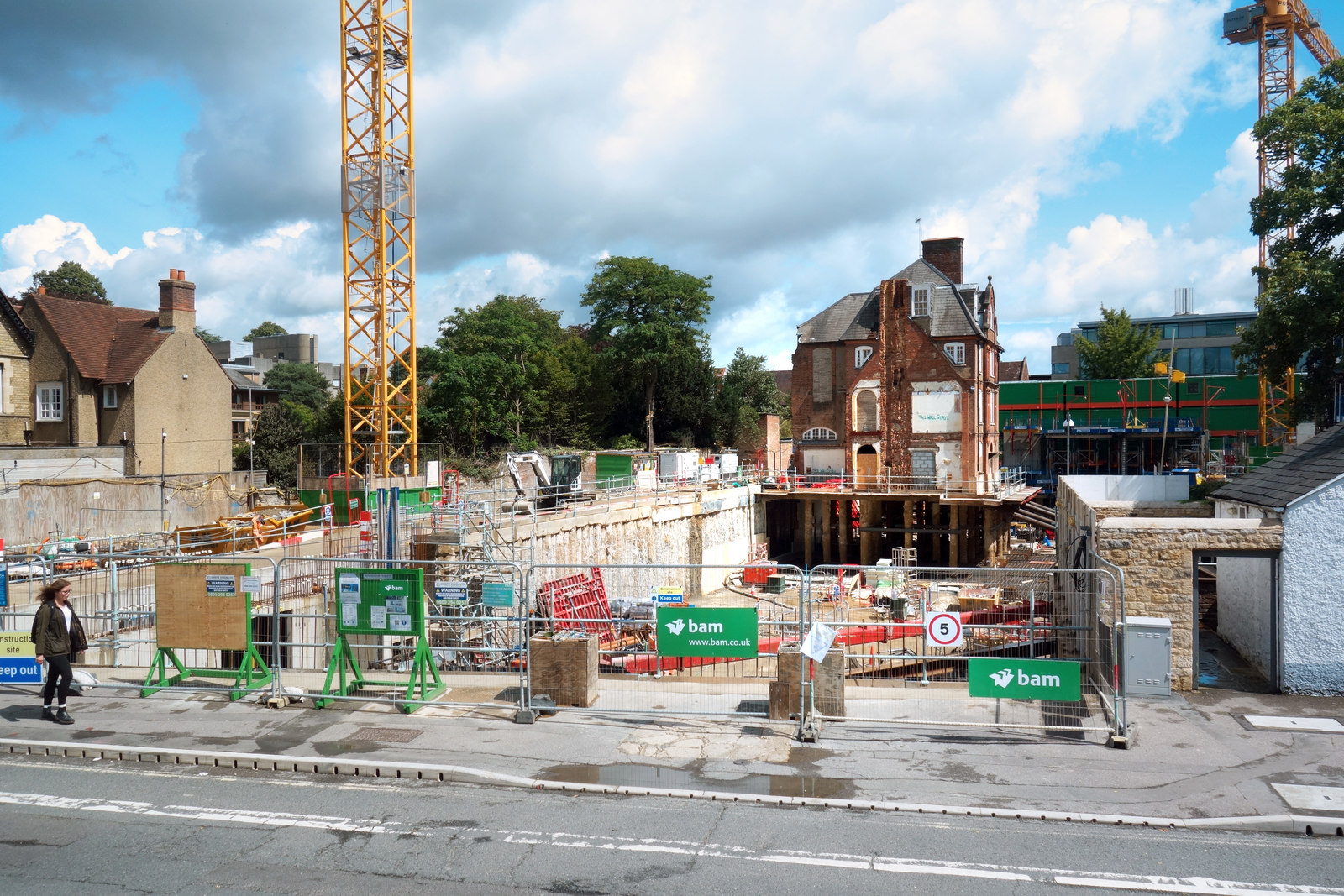
- Acland House under redevelopment

- Shown in Oxfordshire

Geography
- Location: Central North Oxford, England
- Coordinates: 51.7609°N 1.2610°W

Organisation
- Care system: Private

History
- Founded: 1878
- Closed: 2004

The Acland Hospital (also previously known as the Acland Nursing Home, Acland Home and the Sarah Acland Home for Nurses) was a private nursing home and hospital in central North Oxford, England, located in a prominent position at the southern end of the Banbury Road. It was founded in memory of Sarah Acland, the wife of Sir Henry Acland, Regius Professor of Medicine at the University of Oxford. Following redevelopment it now serves as graduate accommodation for Keble College.

== Foundation and history ==
=== 1878–1903 ===
The Sarah Acland Home for Nurses was founded in memory of Sarah Acland (wife of the Oxford academic and physician Sir Henry Acland) who died on 25 October 1878, as the Sarah Acland Home for Nurses. After Sarah Acland's death her friends decided that an institution for nurses would be an appropriate way to memorialize her, and they solicited donations and collected £4,000 from members of the community. Work began quickly and a district nurse associated with the new institution was out working in the field a few weeks after the project began. In 1879 a meeting was held announcing the "Sarah Acland Institution for Nurses", which was initially situated at 37 Wellington Square, Oxford and was supervised by Mrs Rutherford Smith. The new buildings for the Sarah Acland Home were opened on 12 May 1879 by then-Prince of Wales and later King of the United Kingdom, George V. In her 1893 autobiography Recollections of Life and Work, Louisa Twining noted that the facility provided "a most urgent need in the city". The 1984 book The History of the University of Oxford lists the official foundation of the Acland Nursing Home as 1882, and describes it as a "leading institution" of Oxford, which had close ties to Oxford University. A new wing of the hospital was opened in October 1906 which contained operating rooms and sterilization equipment, and the Queen sent a congratulatory letter to the Regius Professor of Medicine at Oxford, Dr. Osler.

Sir Henry Acland retired from his Regius Professorship at Oxford in 1894, and he apportioned a large percentage of a £3,000 testimonial to the Home for Nurses for expansion. In 1895 the hospital functioned as "an institution that provides district nurses and medical appliances for the poor, and maintains private nurses and a medical and surgical home to which patients unable to afford the ordinary fees are admitted on a reduced scale of charge." Writing in Sir Henry Wentworth Acland, Bart., K.C.B., F.R.S., Regius Professor of Medicine in the University of Oxford: A Memoir which was published after Sir Henry Acland's death, co-author James Beresford Atlay commented that Acland would have been pleased with the way the institution had flourished from 1879 to 1903: "Dr. Acland … had had daily evidence of the misery suffered by the rich and poor alike in the absence of trained nursing. The memorial to his wife could have assumed no form more acceptable to him." Atlay wrote in the 1903 work: "The 'Sarah Acland Home' is now one of the most flourishing and valued institutions in Oxford. So great is its usefulness, so indispensable do its nurses seem, that one marvels how the town or the University had existed without it."

=== 1903–2004 ===
The Egyptologist Nora Griffith died here of peritonitis after an appendectomy in 1937. Writer Mary Renault worked at the hospital in 1943. Poet John Betjeman had a cyst removed at the Acland in August 1945. Author C. S. Lewis entered the Acland on 15 July 1963 and suffered a heart attack there; J. R. R. Tolkien visited him there when he was convalescing.

According to The Victoria History of Oxford, the Acland Nursing Home was the "only hospital in Oxford which did not join the National Health Service in 1948". The Acland Home was renamed as the Acland Hospital in 1964.

In a 2003 review of Oxford hospitals in The Sunday Times, the reviewer commented: "The hospital misses out narrowly on more of our quality awards for its diagnostic services and physiotherapy." In 2004, The Sunday Times reported that the Acland Hospital had 36 beds, and consultants in 44 specialities. In 2004 the Banbury Road site was sold to Keble College, who used the former hospital as graduate accommodation before demolishing it in 2016 (other than the Jackson building) to develop their H B Allen Centre on the site as a new graduate campus. The hospital moved to Headington on a site adjoining the John Radcliffe Hospital, a suburb in east Oxford, when it was renamed The Manor Hospital. The Manor Hospital site was formerly the grounds of the Oxford United Football Club (OUFC). The Manor Hospital has 71 rooms, an intensive care unit with seven beds, six operating theatres, and CT and MRI scanners.

== Sale and re-development ==
In December 2004, Keble College purchased the Acland Hospital from the Nuffield Hospital Trust for £10.75 million. As part of its 150th Anniversary campaign, Keble built a new graduate complex, the H B Allen Centre on the site, which opened in 2019. Part of the old hospital, now called Sarah Acland House, is a Grade II listed building, and a challenge in construction was preserving this structure.

== Architecture ==
The Acland Home originally occupied houses in Wellington Square. In 1895 Northgate House, the former home of Henry Octavius Coxe (1811–1881), librarian of the Bodleian, was leased from Lincoln College for 99 years. A new wing for paying patients was added 1895–96, designed by a leading architect of the time, Sir Thomas Graham Jackson in conjunction with Douglas Strutt Galton (1822–1899), a great authority on government hospitals and cousin of Sir Francis Galton (1822–1911). When it opened it was said to be the first Nursing Home or 'Home Hospital' for paying patients to be built especially for the purpose, all the earlier nursing homes being merely adapted houses. The second extension by Robert Langton Cole was built between 1905 and 1906, and opened on 13 October 1906, the bulk of the funds having been raised by Sarah Angelina Acland. In his 1899 work The Cathedral Church of Oxford, Percy Dearmer described the building as a "medallion in statuary marble, set in giallo antico". In 1937, a neo-Georgian frontage was added by R. Fielding Dodd.

To the south is another building by Jackson, originally the location of the Oxford High School for Girls and later an annexe of the Oxford University Department of Metallurgy (now the Department of Materials). These are two of the few buildings in North Oxford designed by Jackson. His other notable buildings in Oxford include Hertford College (including the Bridge of Sighs) amongst other college buildings.
