= Keble College, Oxford =

College of University of Oxford

Keble College
- University of Oxford
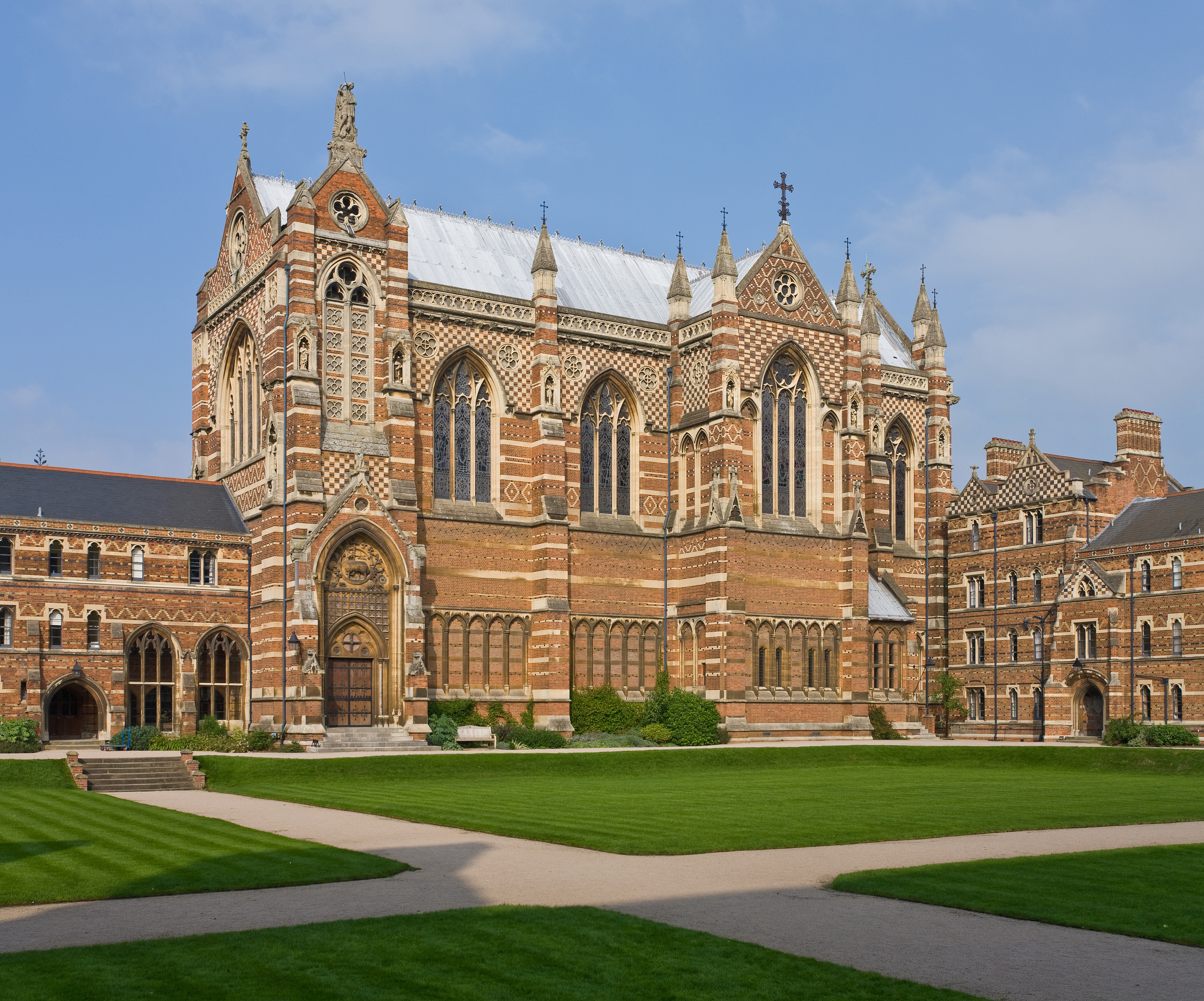

- Arms: Argent, a chevron engrailed gules, on a chief azure, three mullets pierced or
- Location: Parks Road, Oxford OX1 3PG
- Coordinates: 51.758899°N 1.257715°W
- Latin name: Collegium de Keble, Collegium Keblense
- Motto: Plain living and high thinking
- Established: 1870; 156 years ago
- Named for: John Keble
- Architect: William Butterfield
- Sister college: Selwyn College, Cambridge; Benjamin Franklin College, Yale
- Warden: Dame Sarah Whatmore
- Chaplain: Fr Max Kramer
- Undergraduates: 465
- Postgraduates: 550
- Senior tutor: Dr Ali Rogers
- Endowment: £66.3 million (2024)
- Website: www.keble.ox.ac.uk
- JCR: jcr.keble.ox.ac.uk
- MCR: mcr.keble.ox.ac.uk

Map
- Location within Oxford city centre

Keble College (/ˈkiːbəl/) is one of the constituent colleges of the University of Oxford in England. Its main buildings are on Parks Road, opposite the University Museum and the University Parks. The college is bordered to the north by Keble Road, to the south by Museum Road, and to the west by Blackhall Road.

Keble was established in 1870, having been built as a monument to John Keble, who had been a leading member of the Oxford Movement which sought to stress the catholic nature of the Church of England. Consequently, the college's original teaching focus was primarily theological, although the college now offers a broad range of subjects, reflecting the diversity of degrees offered across the wider university. In the period after the Second World War, the trends were towards scientific courses (proximity to the university science area east of the University Museum influenced this). As originally constituted, it was for men only and the fellows were mostly bachelors resident in the college. Like many of Oxford's men's colleges, Keble admitted its first mixed-sex cohort in 1979.

Keble remains distinctive for its once-controversial neo-gothic red-brick buildings designed by William Butterfield. The buildings are also notable for breaking from Oxbridge tradition by arranging rooms along corridors rather than around staircases, in order that the scouts could supervise the comings and goings of visitors (Girton College, Cambridge, similarly breaks this tradition).

Keble is one of the largest colleges of the University of Oxford, with 465 undergraduates and 550 graduate students as of 2024. Keble's sister college at the University of Cambridge is Selwyn College.

== History ==
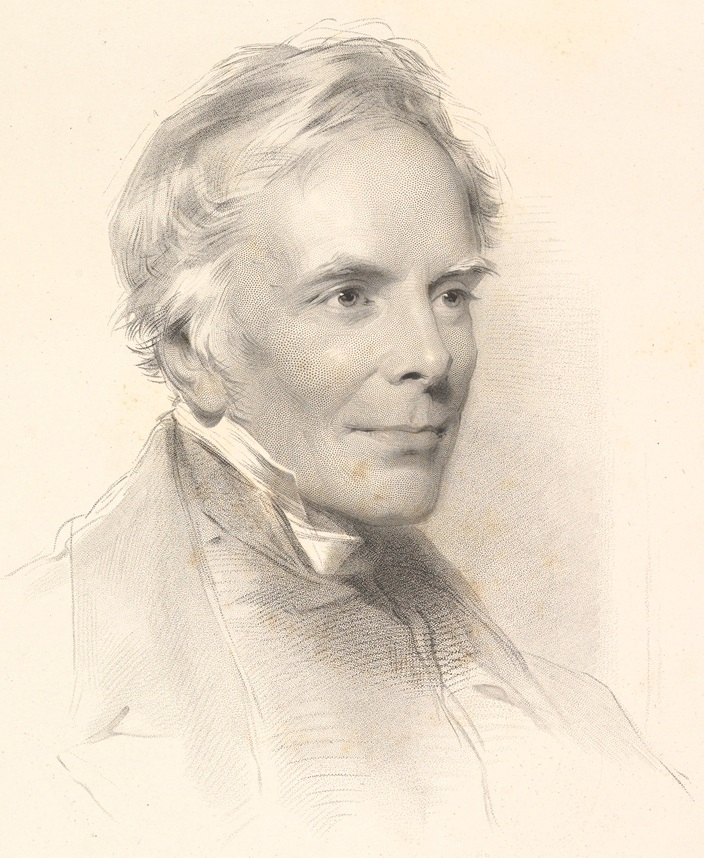
John Keble, a leading member of the Oxford Movement, after whom the college is named

The best-known of Keble's Victorian founders was Edward Pusey, after whom the Pusey quad and Pusey room are named. The college itself is named after John Keble, one of Pusey's colleagues in the Oxford Movement, who died four years before the college's foundation in 1870. It was decided immediately after Keble's funeral that his memorial would be a new Oxford college bearing his name. The chosen architect was William Butterfield. Two years later, in 1868, the foundation stone was laid by the Archbishop of Canterbury on St Mark's Day (25 April, John Keble's birthday). The college first opened in 1870, taking in thirty students, whilst the chapel was opened on St Mark's Day 1876. Accordingly, the college continues to celebrate St Mark's Day each year.

Butterfield produced a notable example of Victorian Gothic architecture, among his few secular buildings, which Pevsner characterised as "actively ugly", and which, according to Charles Eastlake, defied criticism. The social historian G. M. Trevelyan expressed the then commonly held, and highly dismissive, view: "the monstrosities of architecture erected by order of the dons of Oxford and Cambridge colleges in the days of William Butterfield and Alfred Waterhouse give daily pain to posterity." Sir Kenneth Clark recalled that during his Oxford years it was generally believed in Oxford not only that Keble College was "the ugliest building in the world" but that its architect was John Ruskin, author of The Stones of Venice. The college is built of red, blue, and white bricks; the main structure is of red brick, with white and blue patterned banding. The builders were Parnell & Son of Rugby.

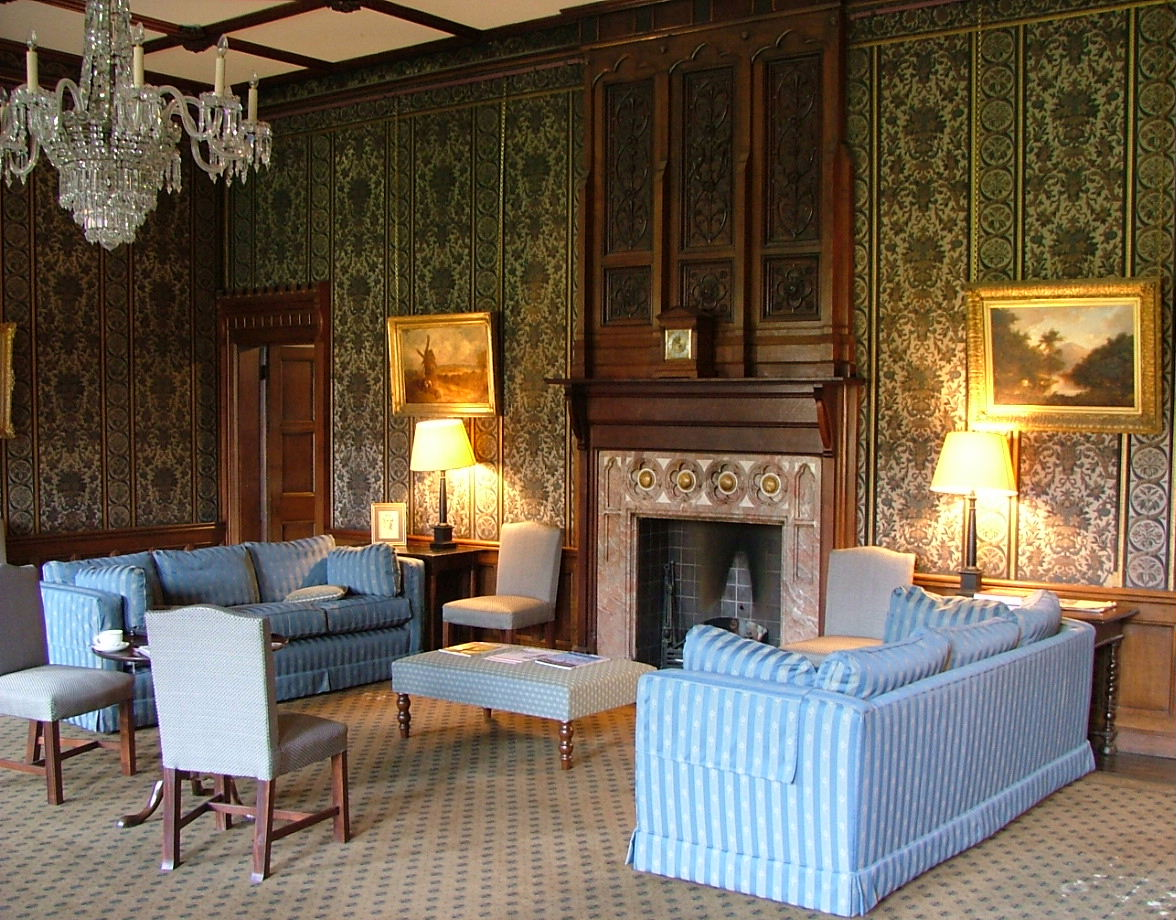
Senior Common Room

On its construction, Keble was not always admired within the university. Undergraduates at St John's College started the Destroy Keble Society, which aimed to dismantle the college brick by brick.

An apocryphal story claims that a French visitor, on first sight of the college exclaimed C'est magnifique mais ce n'est pas la gare? ("It is magnificent but is it not the railway station?"). This is a play on Field Marshal Pierre Bosquet's memorable line, referring to the Charge of the Light Brigade, C'est magnifique, mais ce n'est pas la guerre ("It is magnificent, but it is not war"). This story may have been borrowed from Arthur Wing Pinero's identical quip said to have been made at the opening ceremony for the Royal Courts of Justice in London.

Keble is mentioned in John Betjeman's poem "Myfanwy at Oxford", as well as in the writings of John Ruskin and in Monty Python's "Travel Agent" sketch. Horace Rumpole, the barrister in John Mortimer's books, was a Law graduate of Keble.

In 2005, Keble College featured in the national UK press when its bursar, Roger Boden, was found guilty of racial discrimination by an employment tribunal. An appeal was launched by the college and Boden against the tribunal's judgement, resulting in a financial out-of-court settlement with the aggrieved employee.

In Christmas of 2017, a team of alumni from Keble College won the Christmas University Challenge, a seasonal programme on BBC2. They beat the University of Reading by 240 points to 0 in the final, the only time a team has ever failed to score a point.

== Buildings ==
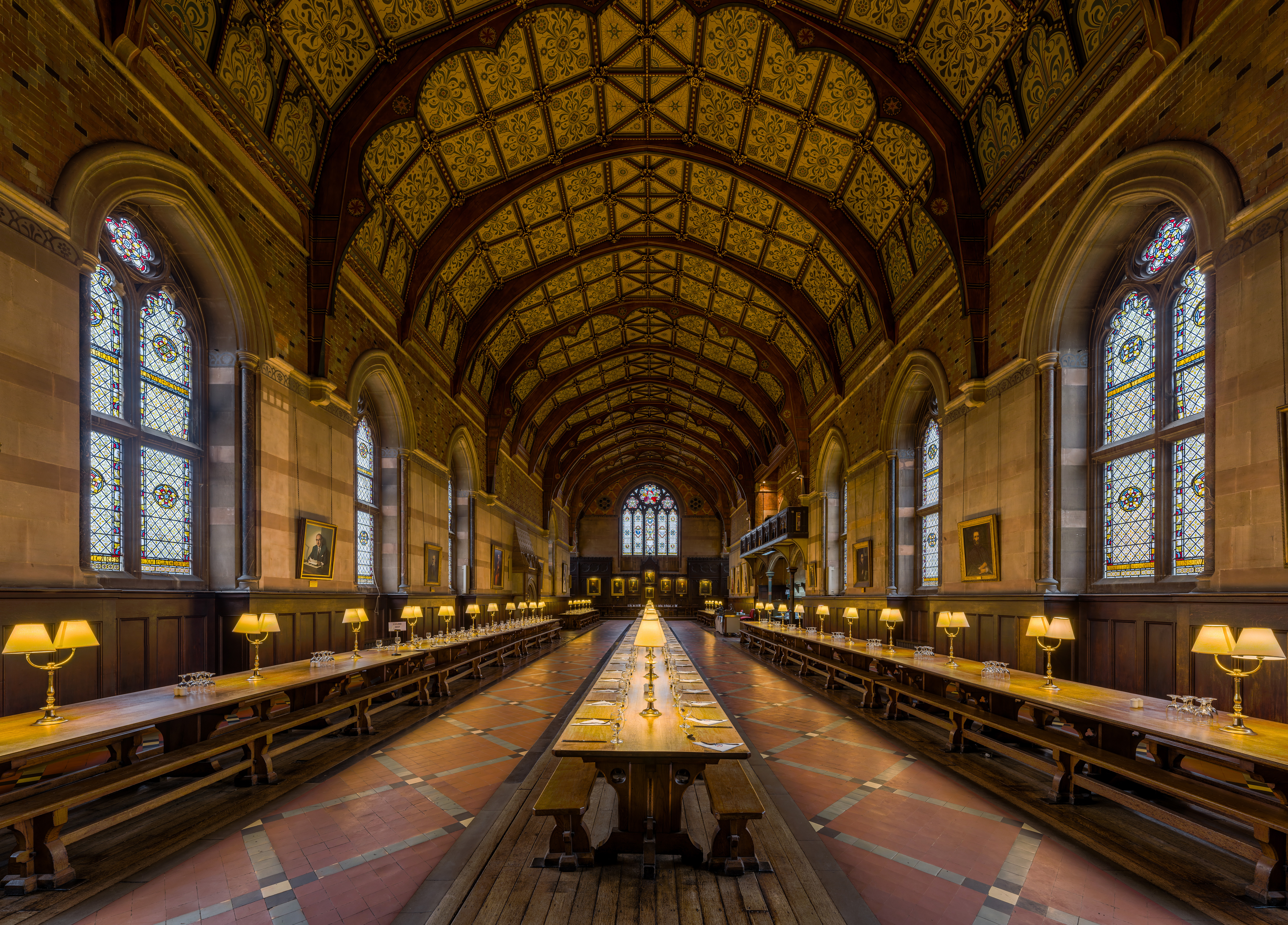
Keble Hall

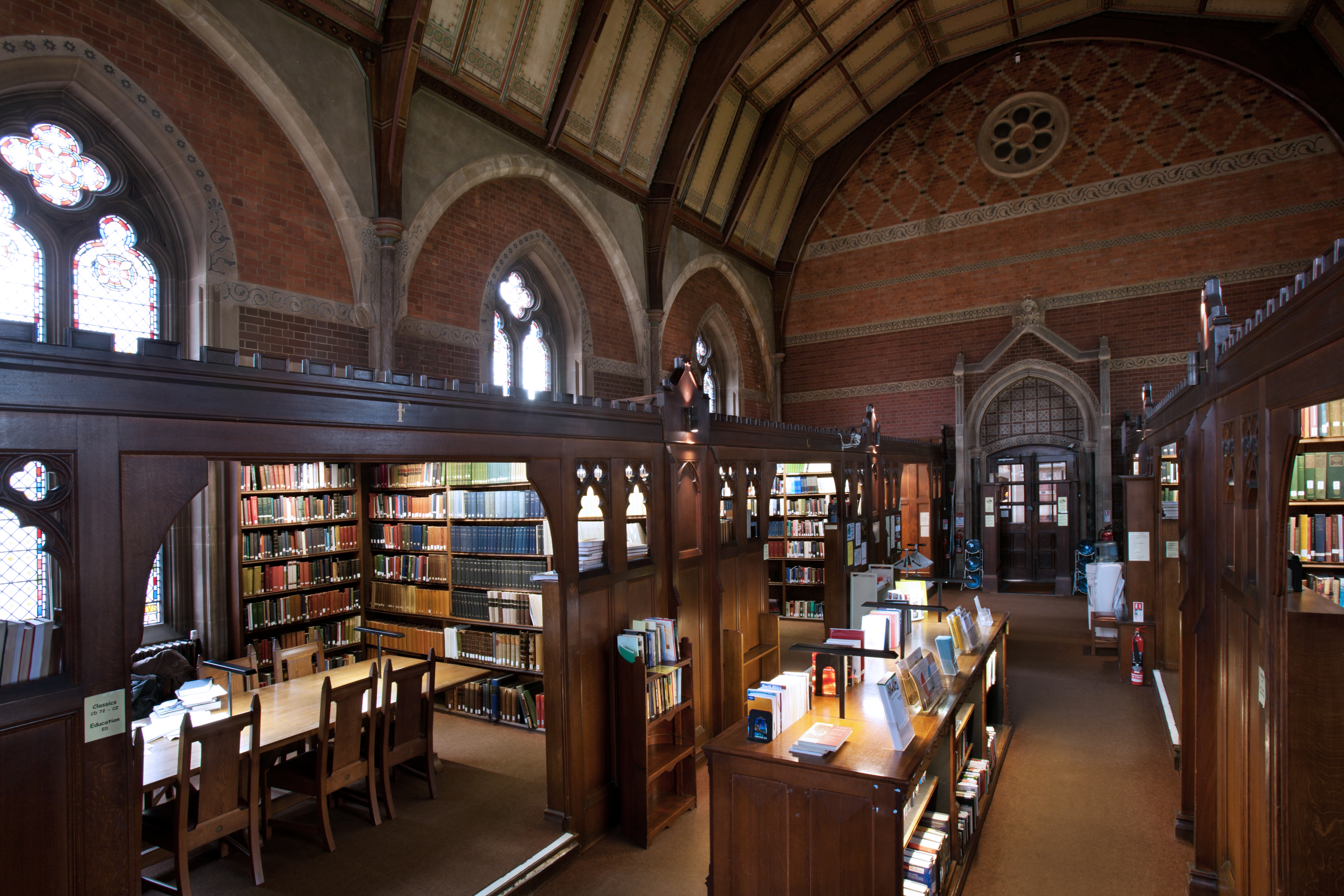
Keble Library

The main site of Keble contains five quads: Liddon (the largest, named after Henry Parry Liddon), Pusey (named after Edward Bouverie Pusey), Hayward (named after Charles Hayward), De Breyne (named after Andre de Breyne) and Newman (named after John Henry Newman).

=== Original buildings ===
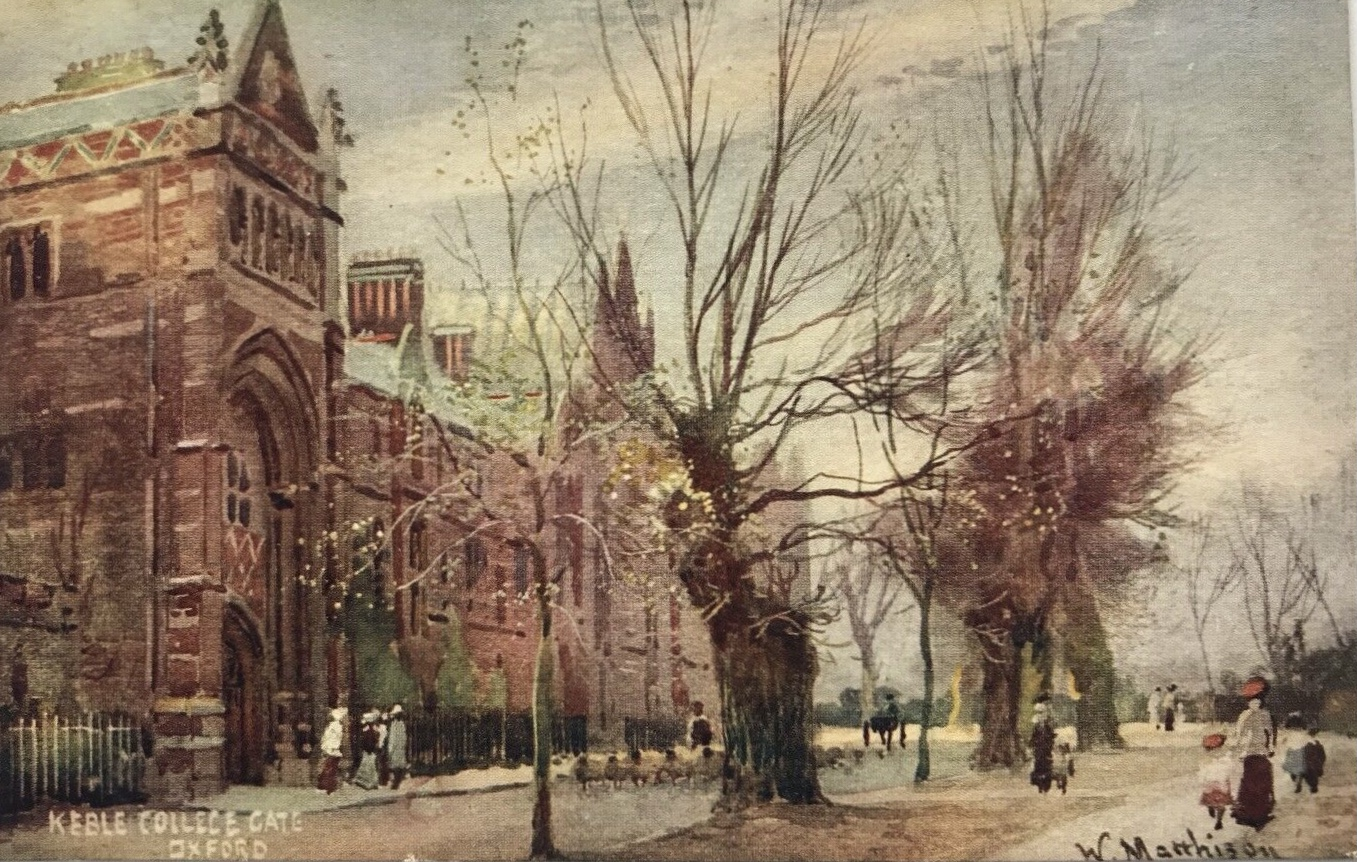
Parks Road front, 1910

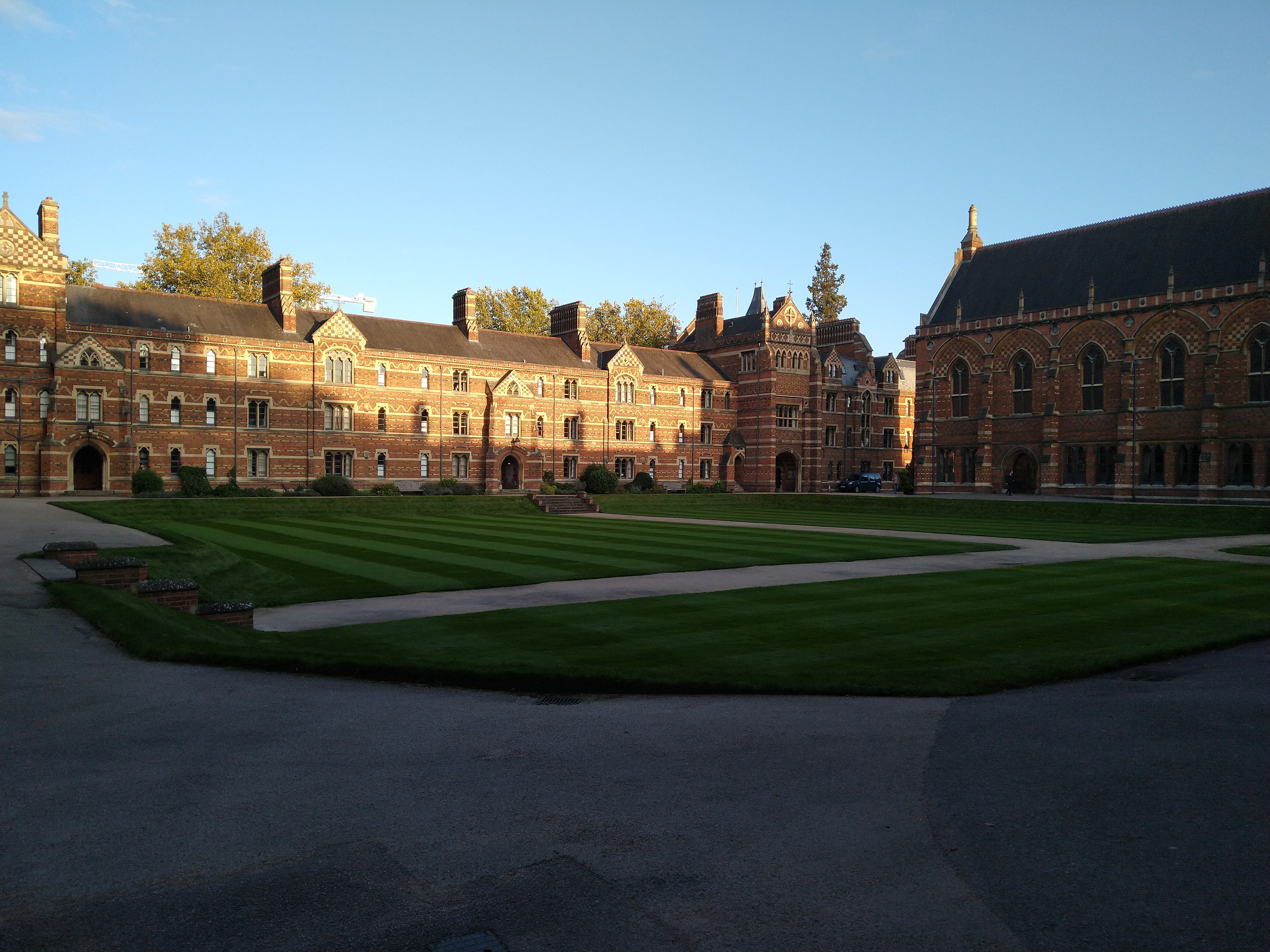
Liddon Quad

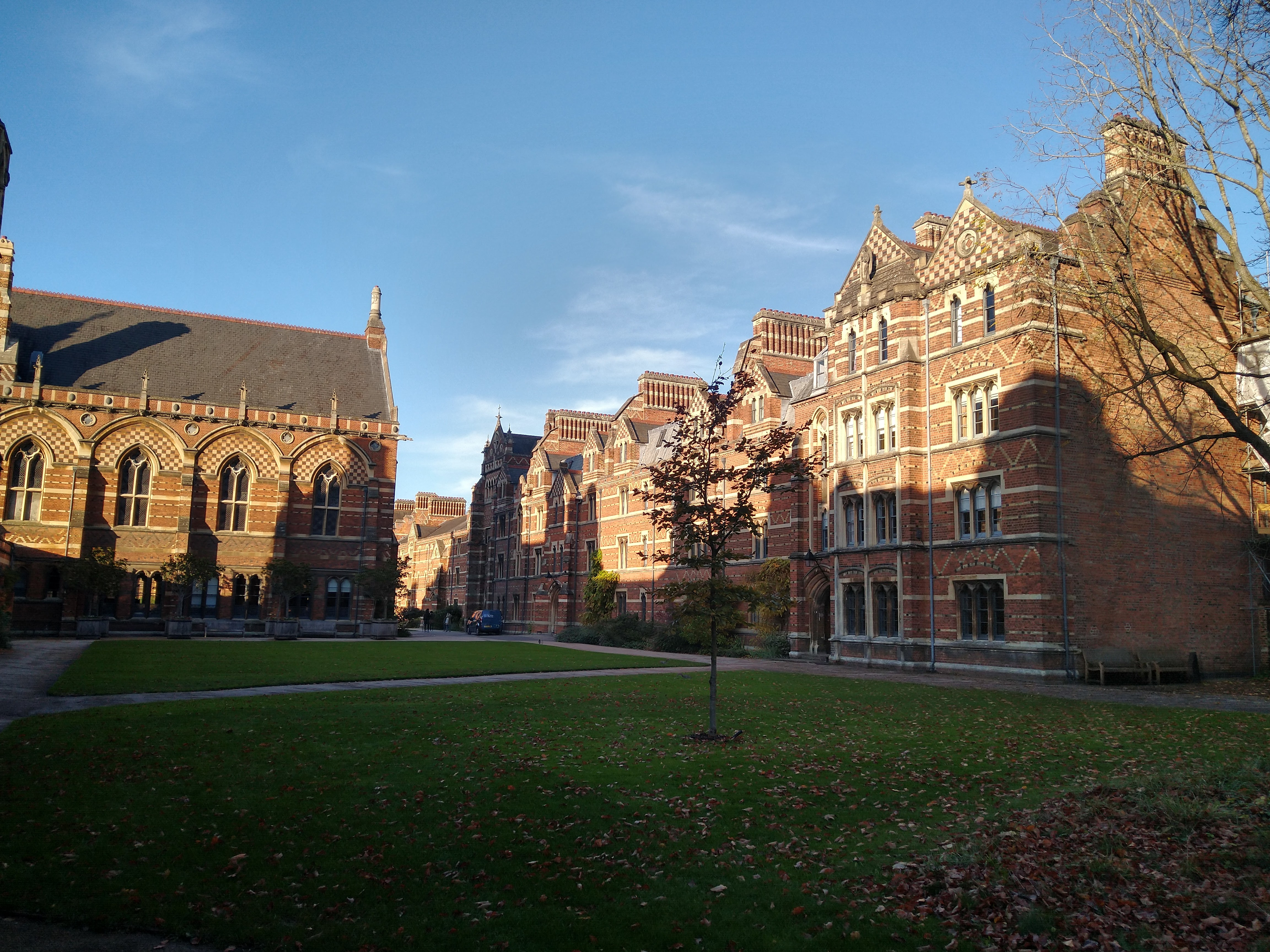
Pusey Quad

The best-known portion of Keble's buildings is the distinctive main brick complex, designed by Butterfield. The design remained incomplete due to shortage of funds. The Chapel and Hall were built later than the accommodation blocks to the east and west of the two original quadrangles and the warden's house at the southeast corner. The Chapel and Hall were both fully funded by William Gibbs and were also designed by Butterfield.

=== Modern buildings ===
A section west of the chapel was built in a different style in the 1950s with funds from Antonin Besse. Later still further significant additions have been added, most notably the modern, brick Hayward and de Breyne extensions by Ahrends, Burton and Koralek (ABK). The extensions were made possible by a generous response from the businessmen Charles Hayward and André de Breyne and other fund-raising efforts. The ABK buildings included the college's memorable, futuristic "goldfish bowl" bar, opened on 3 May 1977 and later refurbished and expanded. In 1995, work was completed on the ARCO building by the US-born architect Rick Mather. This was followed in 2002 by another similarly styled building also designed by Mather, the Sloane Robinson Building. Along with a number of additional student bedrooms the Sloane Robinson Building also provided the college with the O'Reilly Theatre (a large multipurpose lecture theatre), a dedicated room for musical practice, several seminar rooms and a large open plan space known as the Douglas Price Room. A Grade II* listed building comprising a Fellow's flat and a transformer station were lost upon its construction.

=== O'Reilly Theatre ===
The O'Reilly Theatre is a flexible studio theatre that was completed in 2002 and is part of the Sloane Robinson Building. Theatreplan designed the theatre itself in collaboration with Rick Mather Architects, at a cost of £1.2 million.

The seating capacity of the space ranges from 128 to 250, depending on the setup chosen. The standard configuration is end-on, but alternatives include traverse and in-the-round. The theatre is named after Sir Tony O'Reilly, the Irish businessman and former international rugby union player, who contributed most of the funds.

The Theatre is managed by the Martin Esslin Society, who are responsible for choosing the productions staged in the theatre each term. Talks are also given by well-known actors.

=== H B Allen Centre ===
In July 2004 Keble announced the purchase of the former Acland Hospital for £10.75 million. This 1.7-acre (6,900 m^{2}) site, situated a couple of minutes walk from the main college buildings, housed an estimated 100 graduate students. In October 2015 it was confirmed that Keble College had received funding from The H B Allen Charitable Trust to redevelop the Acland Site in order to provide double the number of graduate rooms. This was the largest single donation in the college's history. Work on construction of the H B Allen Centre, designed by Rick Mather, began in 2016, with the first graduate students moving in in October 2018. Keble previously owned several houses across Oxford which were used as additional student accommodation, but these were sold following the purchase of the Acland site.

The H B Allen Centre was officially opened by Prince William, Duke of Cambridge on 3 October 2019.

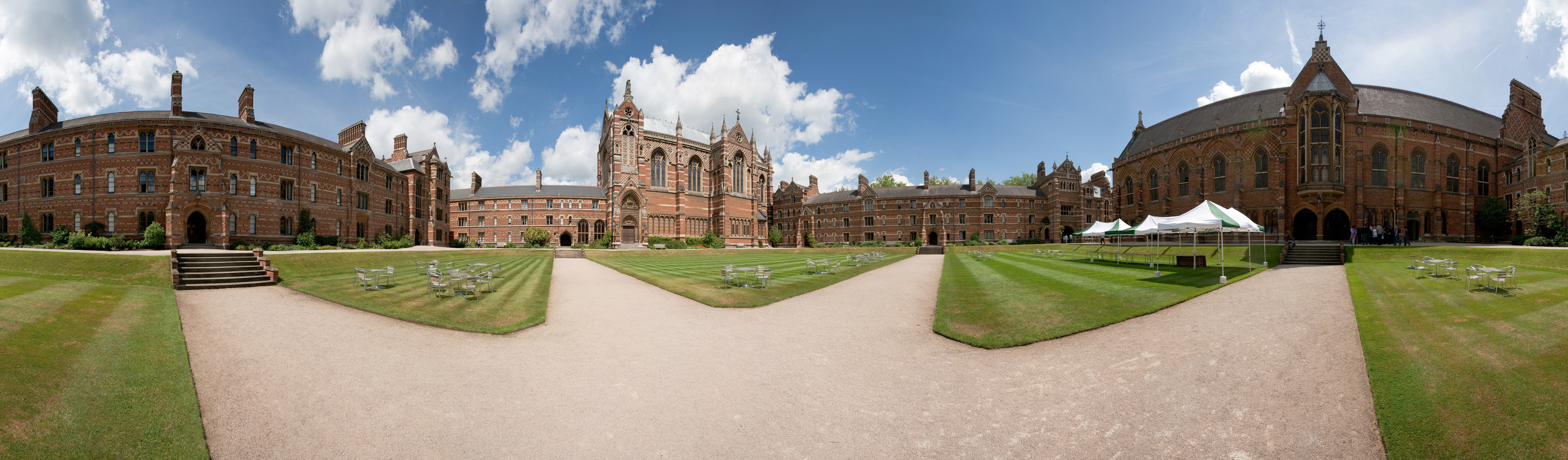
A 360° view of Keble College's Liddon Quadrangle

== Student life ==
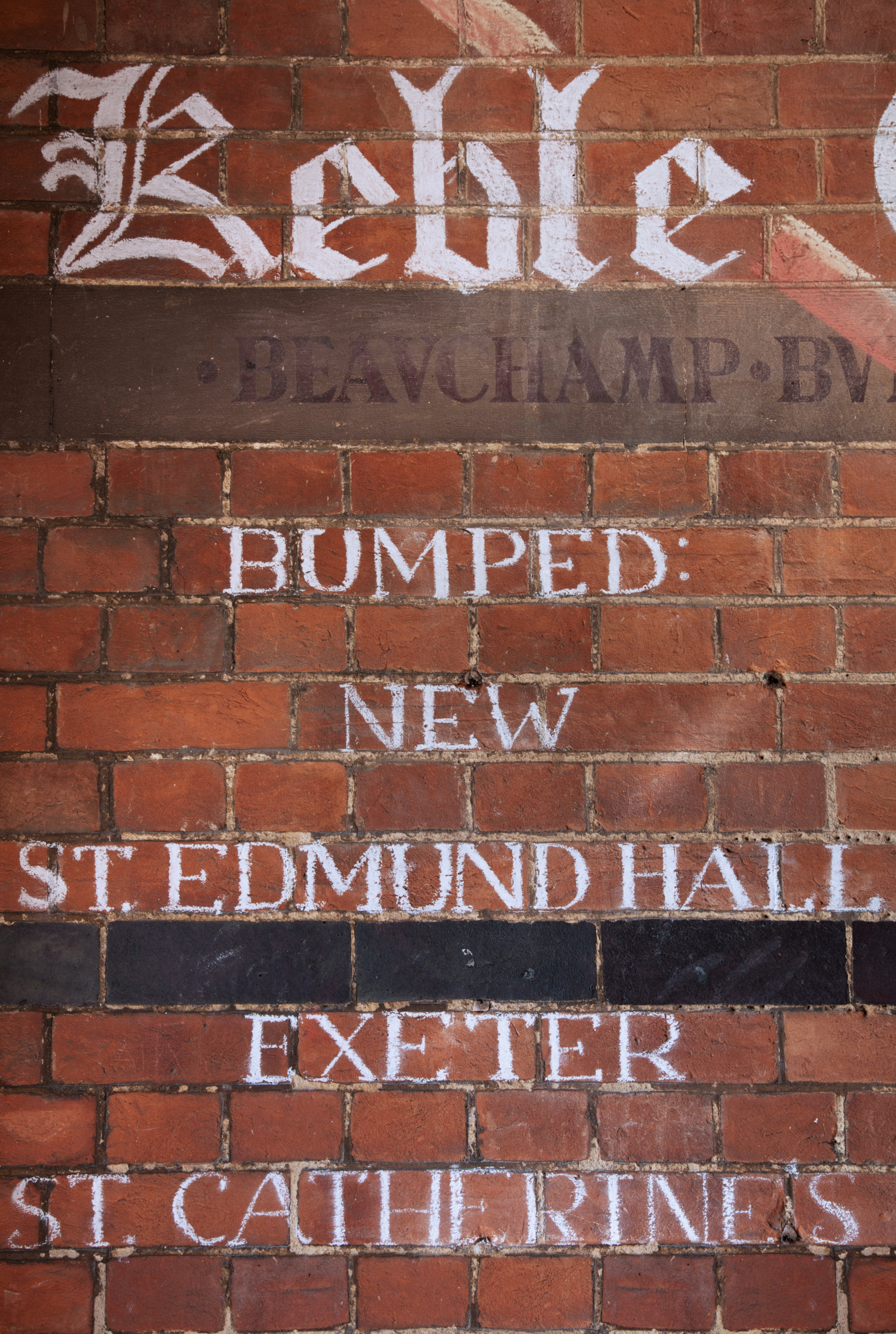
Bumps results of the boat club on a wall in Keble

The college publishes a termly magazine called The Brick which is sent to Keble alumni to update them on college life. Students used to publish an irreverent spoof version on the last Friday of each term, also named The Brick, recording college gossip but this version has not been published since Hilary 2006.

Graduating students who make a donation to the college receive a foam brick on the day of their graduation ceremony.

Keble were champions of the television quiz show University Challenge in 1975 and 1987.

Each year the Advanced Studies Centre invites distinguished speakers for their Creativity Lecture Series. In 2011 the list included Nicholas Humphrey, Tim Ingold and Steve Rayner; in 2012 Robin Dunbar, Kevin Warwick and Margaret Boden were featured.

The Keble Ball was last held in 2026.

=== Sport ===
Keble fields several sports teams. Its rugby teams have been successful in winning the intercollegiate league for five seasons in a row and triumphing in the 2007, 2009, 2011, 2015 and 2017 rugby Cuppers, having also been finalists in 2008 and 2010. Keble College Boat Club, the college rowing club, competes annually in Torpids and Summer Eights. Keble has also had significant success in football, with the college football teams completing an unprecedented treble in 2024 by winning the Men's first XI, second XI and Women's Cuppers in the same season.

Keble College Sports Ground is located on Woodstock Road, and as well as hosting Cuppers matches, also lays the stage for annual fixtures between current undergraduates and Old Members, particularly in football and cricket. Commemorative photographs of important matches adorn the walls of the Keble Cricket Pavilion inside the ground.

== The Light of the World ==
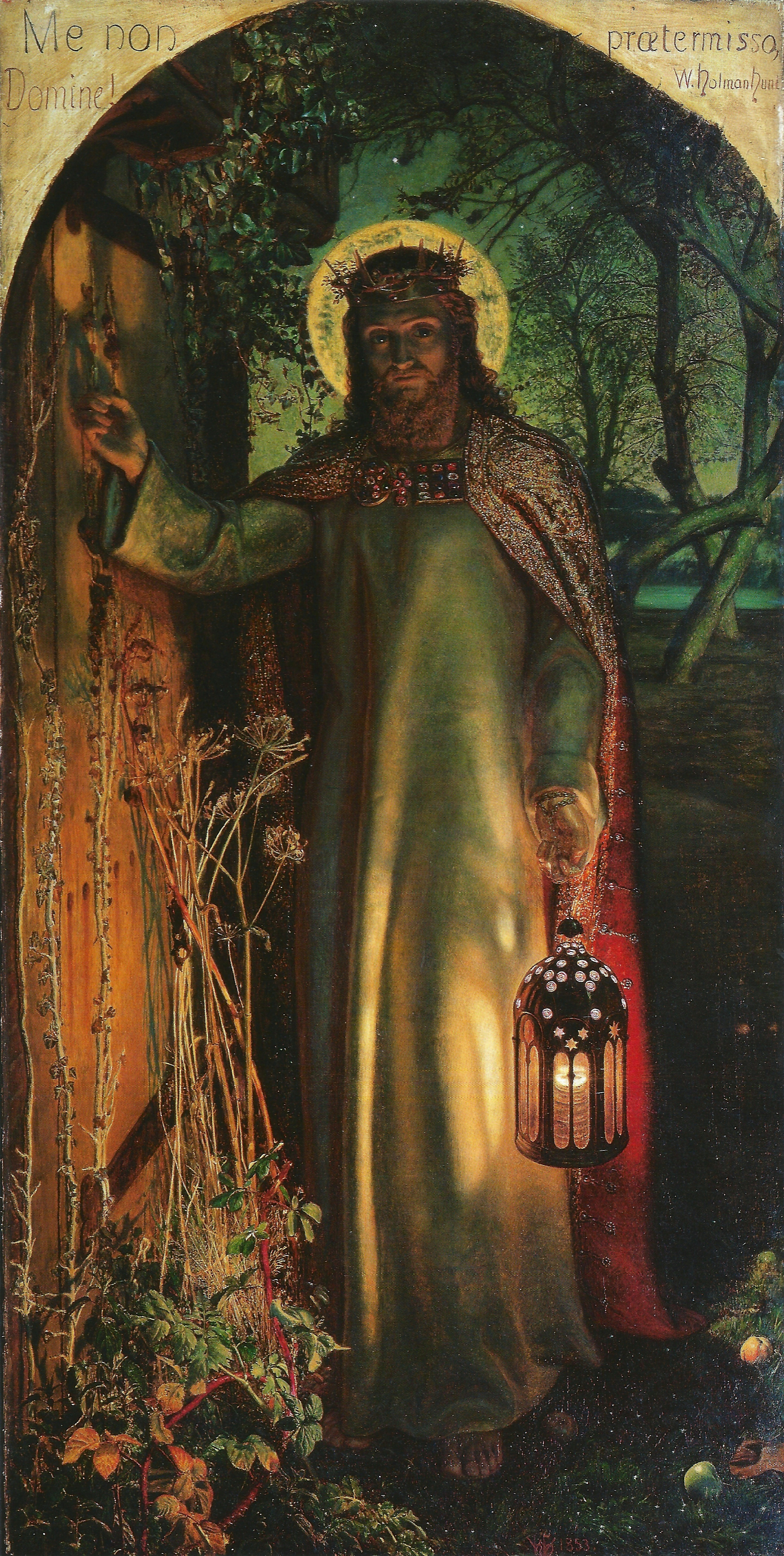
The version of The Light of the World at Keble College

Keble owns the original of William Holman Hunt's painting The Light of the World, which is hung in the side chapel (accessed through the chapel). The picture was completed in 1853 after eight years of work and originally hung in the Royal Academy. It was then gifted to the college. Hunt originally wanted the painting to be hung in the main chapel but the architect rejected this idea, as a result, he painted another version of the painting which is in St Paul's Cathedral, London. This copy was painted by Hunt when he was nearly 70.

== College stamps ==
Keble College has the distinction of being the first college to issue stamps for the prepayment of a porter/messenger delivery service in 1871 only one year after it was founded, and it set the pace for other Oxford colleges to issue their own stamps. This service was successfully challenged by the post office in 1886. Keble also issued a college stamp in 1970 to mark its 100th anniversary.

== Notable conferences at Keble ==
- The Declaration of Clergy on Ritual Conference (January, 1904)
- The Conference on New Ideals in Education (31 March – 7 April 1923)
- The Oxford Movement Conference (July, 1983)
- The J. R. R. Tolkien Centenary Conference (17–24 August 1992)
- The 12th International Conference on Brain Tumour Research and Therapy (September, 1997)
- The 19th International Radiocarbon Conference (April, 2006)

== In popular culture ==
Keble, under snow, appears as Baidley College in an episode of the television detective show Endeavour, with the young Morse investigating the murder of a don.

== Notable members of Keble ==
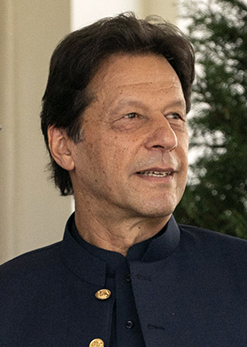
Imran Khan, Cricketer turned philanthropist & politician, (former Prime Minister of Pakistan)

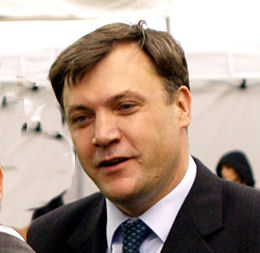
Ed Balls, former Shadow Chancellor of the Exchequer

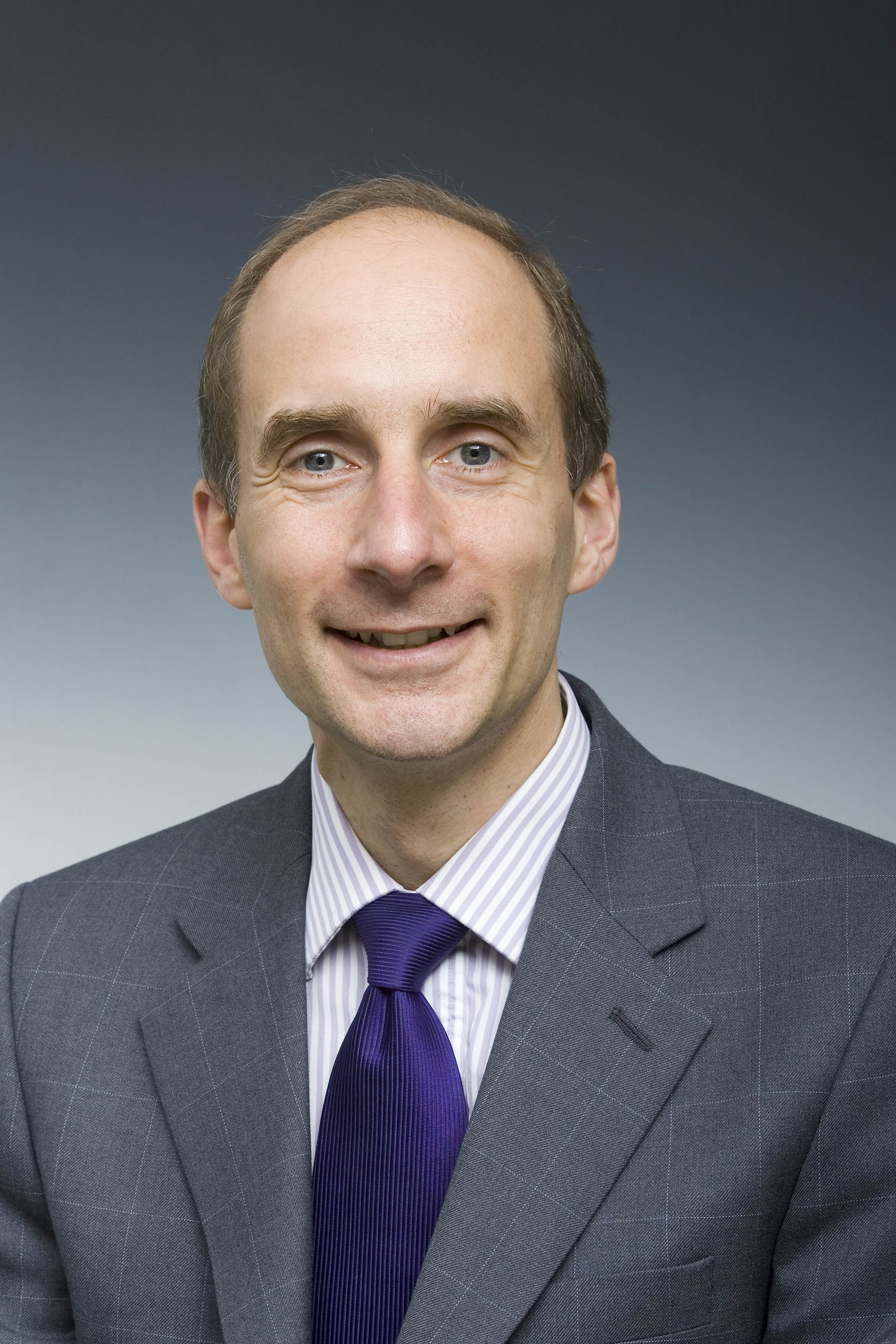
Andrew Adonis, British Labour Party politician

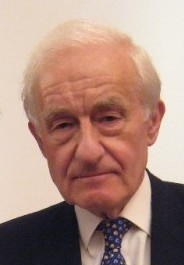
David Wilson, former Governor of Hong Kong

== Sources ==
- Clark, Kenneth (1962). The Gothic Revival: An Essay in the History of Taste. London: John Murray. ISBN 978-0-7195-3102-6.
- Sherwood, Jennifer; Pevsner, Nikolaus (1996). Oxfordshire. The Buildings of England. Yale University Press. ISBN 978-0-300-09639-2.
- Trevelyan, G. M. (1944). English Social History: A Survey of Six Centuries. London: Longmans. OCLC 465934298.
