= Stephens Lyne-Stephens =

British politician

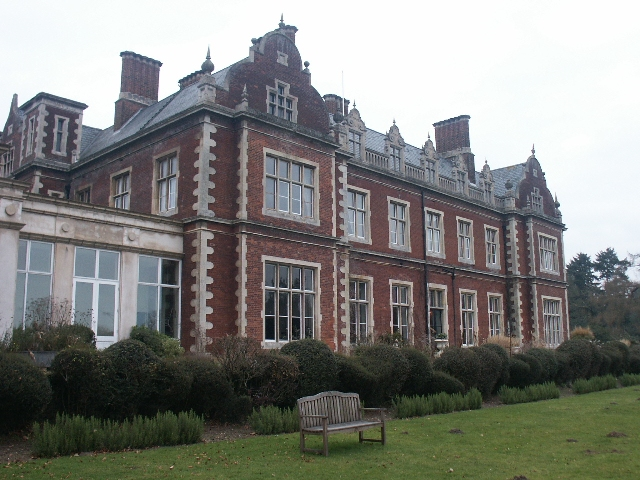
Lynford Hall

Stephens Lyne-Stephens (4 October 1801 – 28 February 1860) was an English Tory politician who represented Barnstaple before the Reform Act 1832 (2 & 3 Will. 4. c. 45). After inheriting a family fortune from glass manufacture in Portugal, he was later reputed to be the richest commoner in England.

== Early life ==
His family owned a glass manufacturer in Portugal, established by William Stephens of Cornwall, an illegitimate child born in 1731.

== Career ==
Lyne-Stephens was returned as Member of Parliament for Barnstaple in 1830. His father had paid over £5,000 for his election which was in support of political reform. On 15 November 1830, Stephens was one of a group of right wing Tories who voted against the government and ended the rule of the Duke of Wellington. Following the political excitement that led to the 1831 Reform Election, Stephens decided not to defend his seat. He concentrated his activities on hunting and shooting. In 1832, he was invited to stand for Liskeard but withdrew his name at the last minute. He moved to Melton Mowbray which he considered excellent hunting and riding country.

He was High Sheriff of Norfolk in 1858.

== Personal life ==
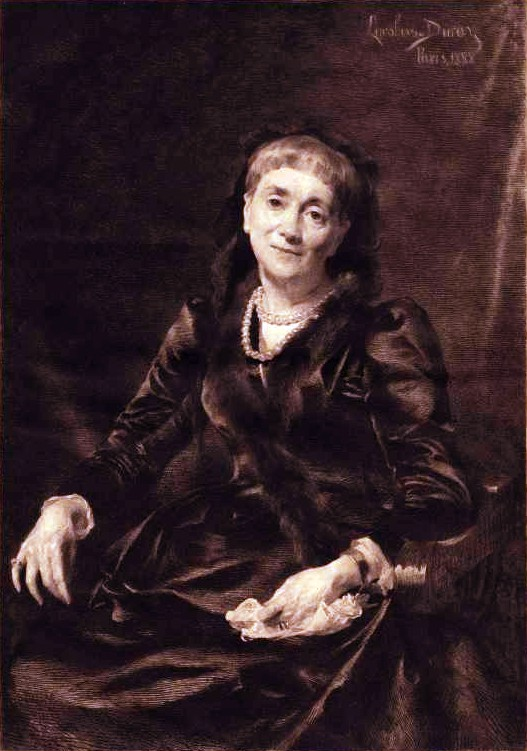
Portrait of Pauline Duvernay by Carolus-Duran, 1888.

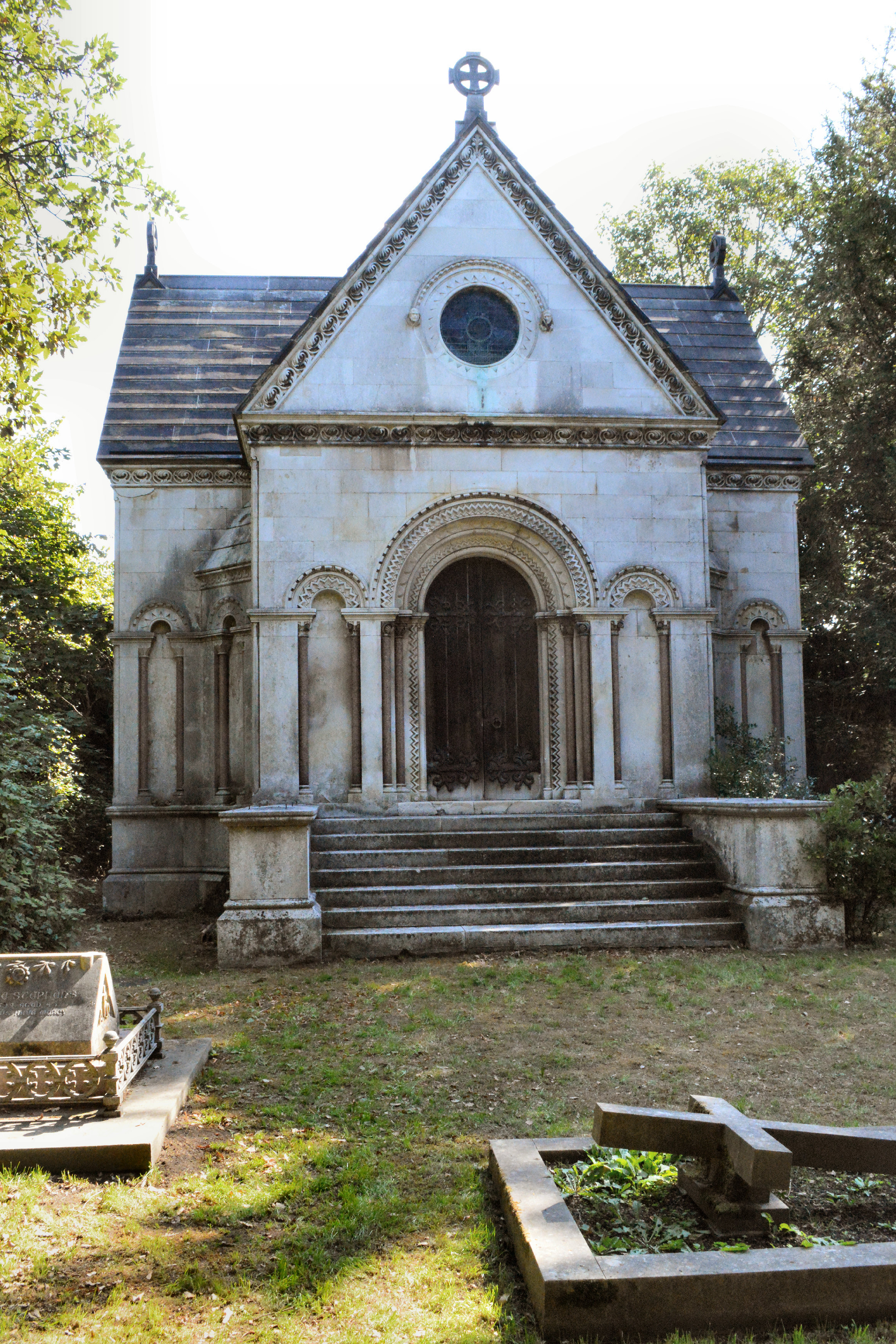
Lyne-Stephens Mausoleum, Roehampton

In 1837, Stephens married French ballerina Pauline Duvernay. He bought Lynford Hall near Thetford in 1856, intending to develop its 8,000 acres (32 km^{2}) with mansion house, parkland and lake as a hunting retreat, and commissioned the architect William Burn to refurbish it.

=== Death and estate ===
His death in 1860 set off a frenzy of fortune hunters, who went so far as to tamper with their family trees in order to bolster their claims to the estate. The fortune had been amassed by William Stephens of Cornwall, an illegitimate child born in 1731. He started a glass factory in Portugal with his brother and members of the related Lyne family. Stephens had influential political connections in Portugal, exempting his business from taxes.

Stephens was interred in Lyne-Stephens Mausoleum, on the grounds of Grove House, on 28 August 1864.

== Notes ==
Parliament of the United Kingdom
Preceded by Frederick Hodgson; Henry Alexander	Member of Parliament for Barnstaple; 1830–1831; With: George Tudor	Succeeded by Frederick Hodgson; John Chichester
Honorary titles
Preceded by Andrew Fountaine	High Sheriff of Norfolk; 1858	Succeeded by Hambleton Francis Custance
