= Montague Gore =

British politician and author

Montague Gore (1800 – 8 September 1864), was a British politician and writer.

== Background ==
Gore was the eldest son of the Rev. Charles Gore of Honbury, Gloucestershire and was the member of a branch of the Gore family that descended from Sir John Gore, Lord Mayor of London in 1624, younger son of Gerard Gore, whose elder son Sir Paul Gore, 1st Baronet, was the ancestor of the Earls of Arran, the Barons Annaly and the Barons Harlech. His father, Reverend Charles Gore, vicar of Henbury, Cheshire, was the brother of William Gore-Langton. His mother was Harriet, daughter of Richard Little. He matriculated at Christ Church, Oxford, 8 May 1818, aged 18, whereupon he became a student of Lincoln's Inn in 1821.

== Political career ==
Gore was returned to Parliament, as a Whig, as one of two representatives for Devizes in 1832, a seat he held until 1834. In that year, he took the Stewardship of the Chiltern Hundreds, having fallen out with the Whigs as part of the Derby Dilly. He attempted to contest Taunton as a Conservative in 1835, but withdrew before polling. He was later Member of Parliament for Barnstaple, as a Conservative, from 1841 to 1847. Gore supported Peel over the Corn Laws. He was the author among other works of Thoughts on the Present State of Ireland, published in 1848.

== Family ==
Gore lived at Barrow Court, Somerset. He died unmarried in September 1864.

Parliament of the United Kingdom
Preceded by John Pearse; George Watson-Taylor	Member of Parliament for Devizes; 1832–1834; With: Wadham Locke	Succeeded by Wadham Locke; Sir Philip Charles Durham
Preceded by Sir John Chichester, Bt; Frederick Hodgson	Member of Parliament for Barnstaple; 1841–1847; With: Frederick Hodgson	Succeeded by Richard Bremridge; Hon. John Fortescue
