= Charles St. John Fancourt =

English Conservative politician (1804–1875)

Charles St. John Fancourt (1804–1875) was an English Conservative politician who sat in the House of Commons from 1832 to 1837 and later a British colonial superintendent. He was the son of Commander John Fancourt and his wife Amelia.

At the 1832 general election Fancourt was elected as a Member of Parliament (MP) for Barnstaple. He held the seat until 1837. Fancourt was Superintendent of British Honduras from 1843 to 1851.

Fancourt died at the age of 70.

Parliament of the United Kingdom
| Preceded by John Chichester; Frederick Hodgson | Member of Parliament for Barnstaple; 1832 – 1837; With: John Chichester | Succeeded by John Chichester; Frederick Hodgson |
