= John Delbridge =

English politician

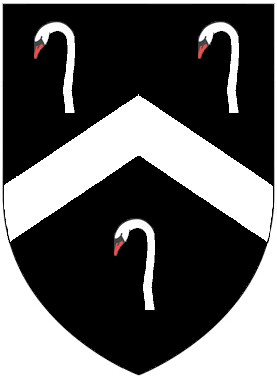
Arms of Delbridge: Sable, a chevron argent between three swan's heads and necks couped proper. As seen on top of mural monument to Elizabeth Chichester (d.1628), first wife of Richard Delbridge, Merchant, son of John Delbridge (d.1639), in St Peter's Church, Barnstaple, (arms of Delbridge impaling Chichester of Hall, Bishop's Tawton)

John Delbridge (1564 – 24 June 1639) was an English merchant from Devon who was elected six times as a Member of Parliament.

== Early life and education ==
He was the second son of Richard Delbridge (d. post 1595), a merchant of Barnstaple, by his wife Alice. He matriculated at Emmanuel College, Cambridge on 3 July 1604 and entered the Middle Temple on 10 May 1606.

== Career ==
He was elected to Parliament to represent his home town, the borough of Barnstaple, in the years 1614, 1621, 1624, 1625, 1626 and 1628. He served three times as mayor of Barnstaple, in 1600-1, 1615–16 and 1633–34. By 1596 he had been elected a Freeman of Barnstaple, and Capital Burgess by 1596; He was Captain of the militia of foot-infantry by 1629 and clerk of the market 1633–34. In trading activities he was a member of the East India Company (1611–21), the French Company (1611), the Virginia Company (1612-post 1623), the North West Passage Company (1612) and the Somers Island Company (1615-post1622). He was a member of the Council for Virginia in 1621. His skills and influence were noted by the great Sir Robert Cecil by whom he was employed from about 1602 to after 1606. He acquired the manor and advowson of West Buckland, Devon.

== Marriage and children ==
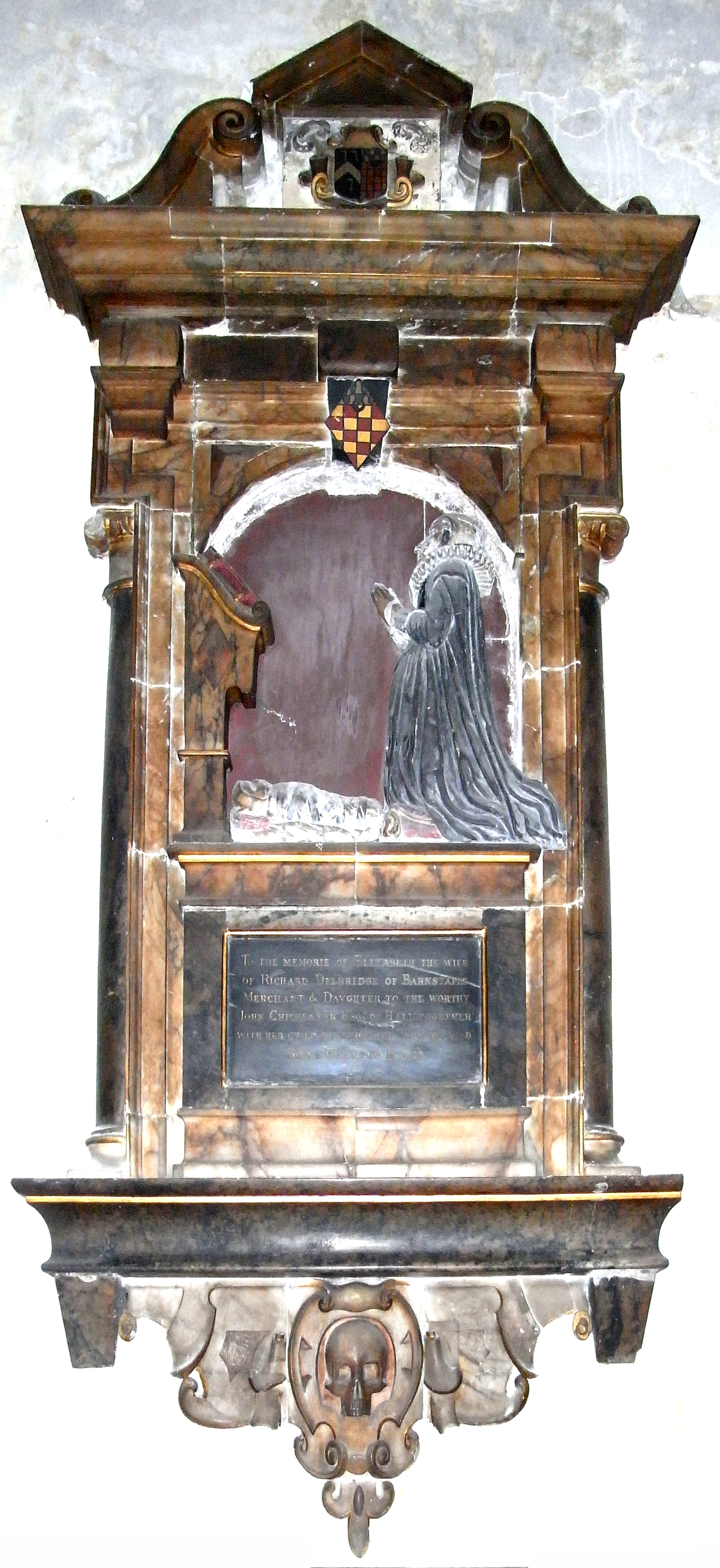
Mural monument to Elizabeth Chichester (d.1628), a daughter of John II Chichester (d.1608) of Hall, Bishop's Tawton and wife of Richard Delbridge. St Peter's Church, Barnstaple

He married on 10 January 1585 to Agnes Downe (d.1639), a daughter of Henry Downe of Barnstaple. They had 5 sons, of whom only one, Richard Delbridge, survived his father, and 3 daughters, of whom only one survived her father. His son Richard married firstly to Elizabeth Chichester (d.1628), to whom he erected a mural monument in St Peter's Church in Barnstaple, a daughter of John II Chichester (d.1608) of Hall, Bishop's Tawton, in which latter parish John Delbridge owned a country estate. The Chichesters of Hall were a junior but nevertheless wealthy branch of the leading North Devon gentry family of Chichester of Raleigh. The Inscription on the monument is as follows: "To the memorie of Elizabeth the wife of Richard Delbridge of Barnstaple, merchant, & daughter to the worthy John Chichester Esq.r of Hall, together with her child of which she died in childbirth 18 December 1628" She is depicted kneeling at a prie dieu with a baby in swaddling clothes on the ground in front of her. Above her is a lozenge showing the arms of Chichester (Chequy or and gules a chief vair a crescent for difference). On top of the monument is an escutcheon with the arms of Delbridge (Sable, a chevron argent between three swan's heads and necks couped proper) impaling Chichester. On Richard's marriage his father settled upon him his lands in Bermuda as the following summary of a deed held by the Royal Institution of Cornwall records: "Covenant:(i) John Delbridge of Barnstaple in Devon, merchant (ii) Richard Delbridge his son and heir; to convey all lands of (i) in the Bermadoes alias Somer Islands in Somersett Tribe and Harryngton Tribe upon marriage of (ii)". Richard Delbridge married secondly in 1631 Elizabeth Speccot, daughter of Thomas Speccot of Speccot, in the parish of Merton, Devon although the pedigree recorded on the 1821 petition of Frances Delbridge in the North Devon Record Office states he married secondly Mary Bassett. His descendants failed to consolidate their place amongst the Devon gentry, and none served again as MP, although the office of Mayor of Barnstaple was held by Nicholas Delbridge in 1619 and by Joseph Delbridge in 1658. Richard's son was Richard II Delbridge (d.1729) who married in 1684 Mary Reed. Their son was Richard III Delbridge (1686–1745), yeoman and freeholder, buried at "Wonworthy" (Wembworthy in North Tawton hundred), who married at "Wonworthy" to Jane Holmes (1720–1804). They had children as follows: Richard IV, Mary, Jane, Elizabeth, Anne and Frances (b.1759), of "Kinsington Mall", whose 1821 petition including a diagram of the above pedigree exists at North Devon Record Office.

== Sources ==
- Venning, Tim & Hunneyball, Paul, biography of John Delbridge published in The History of Parliament: House of Commons 1604–1629, ed. Andrew Thrush and John P. Ferris, 2010

Parliament of England
Preceded by Thomas Hinson; George Peard	Member of Parliament for Barnstaple; 1614–1629; With: John Gostlin 1614–1621; Pentecost Dodderidge 1621–1625; Sir Alexander St John	Parliament suspended until 1640
