= John Gostlin =

English academic and physician

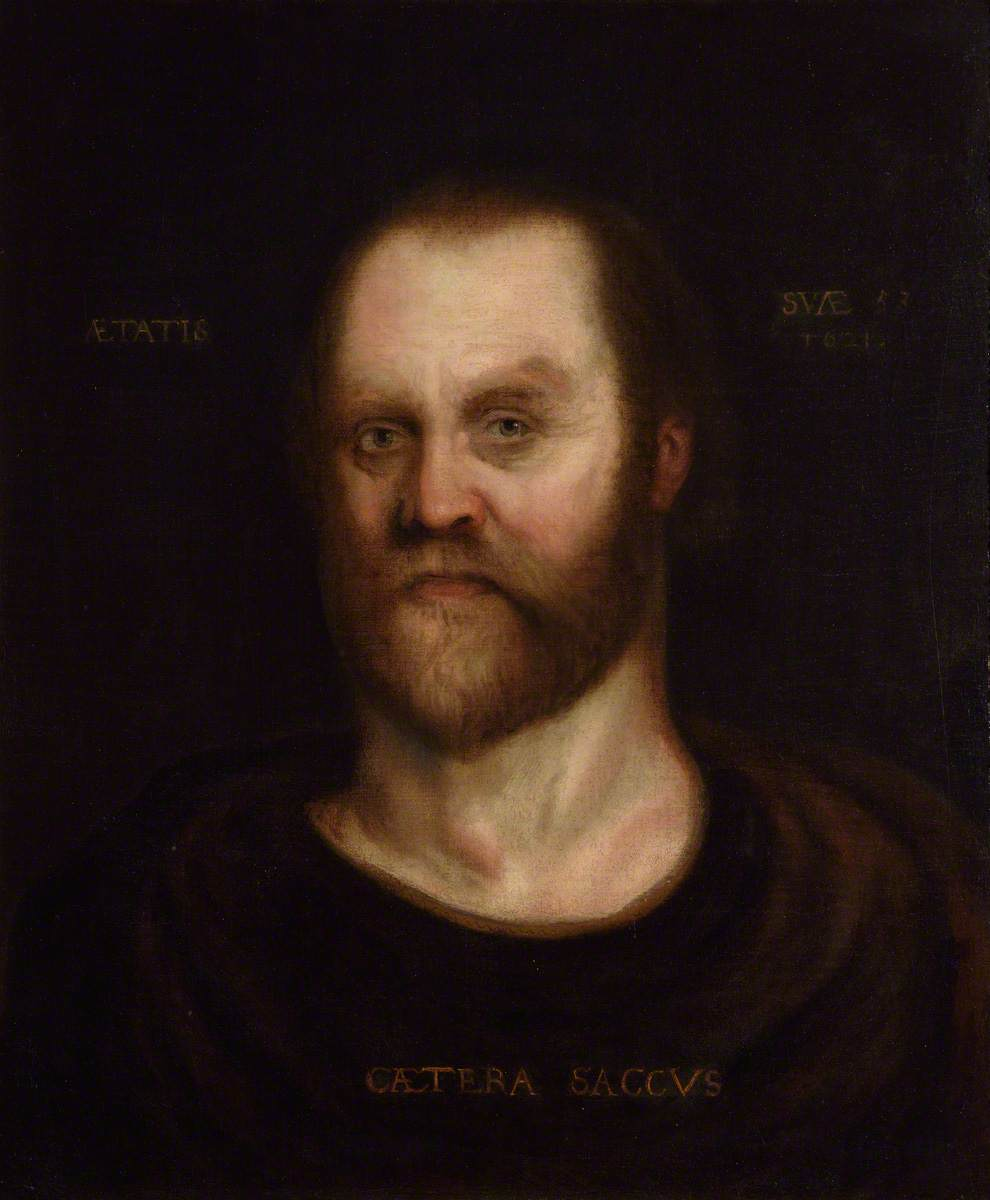
John Gostlin

John Gostlin (or Gostlyn; c. 1566 – 21 October 1626) was an English academic and physician, Master of Gonville and Caius College, Cambridge from 1619 and Regius Professor of Physic.

== Life ==
He was born in Norwich in or about 1566, the son of Robert Gostlin of that city. Educated at Norwich School for six years, he was admitted at Caius College, 22 November 1582, as a scholar. He graduated B.A. 1586–7, M.A. 1590, M.D. 1602 (incorporated M.D. at Oxford, 1612). He was elected to a fellowship about Easter 1591–2, which he retained until he became Master, 26 February 1619.

On the death of Thomas Legge, Master of Caius (12 July 1607), there was an election favouring Gostlin; but when there was a dispute Robert Cecil, 1st Earl of Salisbury, then Chancellor of the university, vacated the election and appointed William Branthwaite, then a Fellow of Emmanuel College. Gostlin then retired to Exeter, where he practised medicine, and was returned as Member of Parliament for Barnstaple in 1614. After Branthwaite's death in January 1619, the fellows immediately met and chose Gostlin. The king's letter was brought soon after, recommending a theologian, but the fellowship had their way.

In 1623 he was appointed Regius Professor of Physic, to which he was recommended by Isaac Barrow. He was twice vice-chancellor of the university, dying during his second tenure of the office, 21 October 1626. There is an account of his death in Joseph Mead's Letters (British Library Harley MS 390); it also was the occasion for an early poem of John Milton. His will is dated 19 October 1626, and was proved 6 December 1626. He was buried in the college chapel, where there is a monument to him. He does not appear to have published any works. He was a benefactor to Gonville and Caius, where he is specially commemorated, and St Catharine's College, Cambridge.

== Notes ==
Academic offices
Preceded by William Branthwaite	Master of Gonville and Caius College; 1619–1626	Succeeded by Thomas Batchcroft
Parliament of the United Kingdom
Preceded by Thomas Hinson; George Pearde	Member of Parliament for Barnstaple; 1614–1621; With: John Delbridge 1614–1629	Succeeded by John Delbridge; Pentecost Dodderidge
