= Thomas Matthew =

English merchant and politician

Thomas Matthew was an English merchant and politician who sat in the House of Commons in 1640.

Matthew was a merchant of Barnstaple and became a burgess of the town. In April 1640, he was elected Member of Parliament for Barnstaple in the Short Parliament. He stood again for the Long Parliament later in the year and was initially returned by the burgesses. However the mayor disagreed with the choice and called for another election in which Richard Ferris was returned instead. Matthew submitted a petition alleging that the mayor had used questionable methods including locking in the burgesses, and had intimidated them. Matthew's petition was rejected.

In 1650 Matthew was Mayor of Barnstaple. He was mayor again in 1667.

Parliament of England
Parliament suspended since 1629	Member of Parliament for Barnstaple; 1640; With: George Peard	Succeeded by George Peard; Richard Ferris
