= Richard Raymond =

Richard Raymond may refer to:

- Richard Raymond (filmmaker), British film producer and director
- Richard Raymond (MP) (died 1418), in 1410 MP for Exeter
- Richard Raymond (Ontario politician), candidate for a 2003 Ontario Legislative Assembly election
- Richard Raymond (pianist) (born 1965), Canadian pianist
- Richard Raymond (publisher) (born 1923), publisher of the Whole Earth Catalog
- Richard Raymond (Texas politician) (born 1960), member of the Texas House of Representatives
- Richard Allen Raymond, former Under Secretary for Food Safety in the US
