= Richard Skinner =

Richard Skinner may refer to:

- Richard Skinner (American politician) (1778–1833), American politician, attorney, and jurist from the US state of Vermont
- Richard Skinner (broadcaster) (born 1951), British radio and television broadcaster
- Richard Skinner (MP) (died 1575), English politician
