= Sir John Chichester, 1st Baronet, of Arlington Court =

Member of Parliament of the United Kingdom

Sir John Chichester Bt

Member of Parliament for Barnstaple
- In office 1831–1841

Personal details
- Born: c.1794
- Died: 20 December 1851 (aged 56–57)
- Party: Whigs
- Spouse: Caroline Thistlethwayte (m. 1838)
- Relations: Sir Charles Chichester (cousin)
- Children: 2
- Nickname: Arlington Jack

Military service
- Allegiance: United Kingdom
- Branch/service: Royal Navy
- Years of service: 1810–1820
- Rank: Lieutenant
- Battles/wars: Napoleonic Wars; Siege of Cádiz; War of 1812 (WIA)

Sir John Palmer Bruce Chichester, 1st Baronet (c. 1794 – 20 December 1851) was an English Whig politician who sat in the House of Commons from 1831 to 1841.

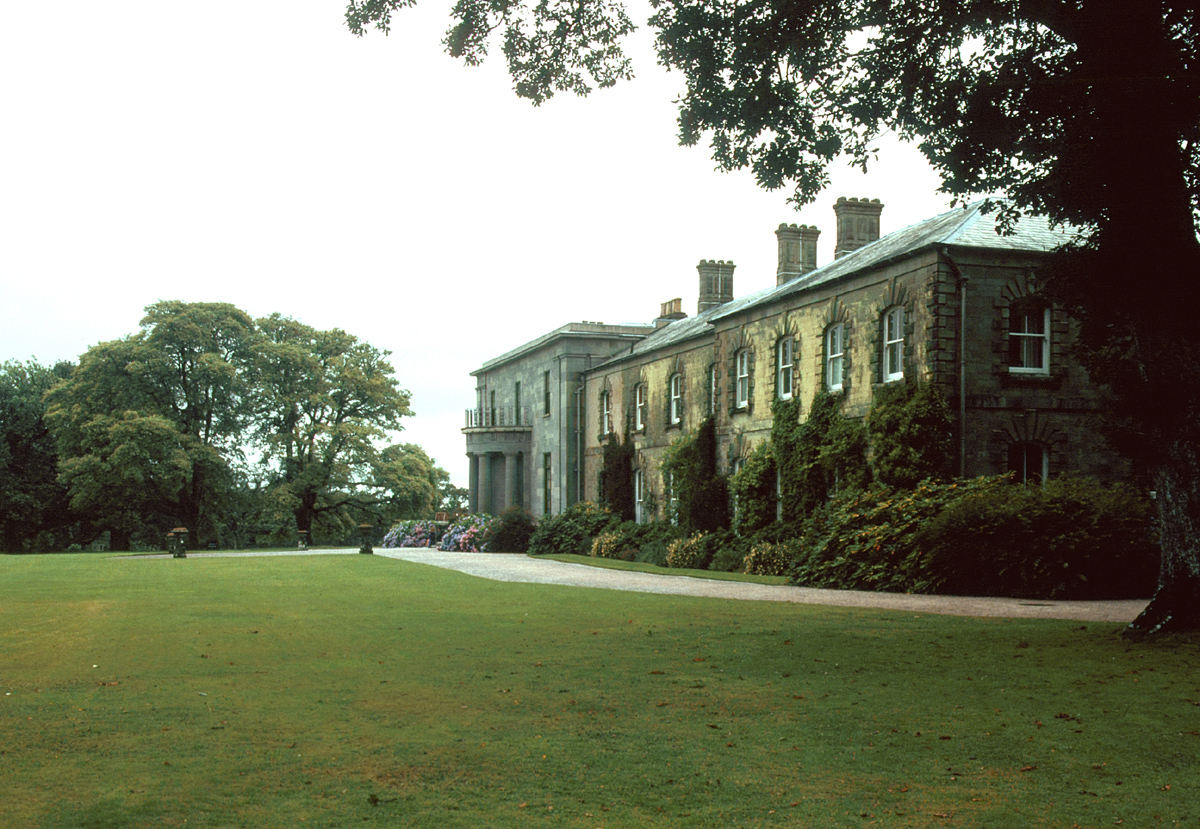
Arlington Court, Devon, England

Chichester was the son of Colonel John Chichester of Arlington Court, Barnstaple. He served in the Royal Navy. Chichester became High Sheriff of Cardiganshire in 1831 when he was living at Llanbadarn Fawr, Cardiganshire.

At the 1831 general election Chichester was elected Member of Parliament (MP) for Barnstaple. He held the seat until 1841. He was created a baronet in 1840.

Chichester died at the age of 57.

Chichester married Caroline Thistlethwayte. Their son Alexander inherited the baronetcy.

Parliament of the United Kingdom
| Preceded by George Tudor; Stephens Lyne-Stephens | Member of Parliament for Barnstaple; 1831 – 1841; With: Frederick Hodgson 1831–32; Charles St John Fancourt 1832–37; Frederick Hodgson from 1837 | Succeeded by Montague Gore; Frederick Hodgson |
Baronetage of the United Kingdom
| New creation | Baronet (of Arlington Court); 1840–1851 | Succeeded by Alexander Chichester |
