= Thomas Raymond =

Thomas Raymond may refer to:

- Thomas Raymond (judge) (1626/27–1683), British judge
- Thomas Lynch Raymond (1875–1928), American politician
- Thomas Raymond (MP) (died 1418), English politician
- Thomas or Toro Raymond
