= 1880 Barnstaple by-election =

UK parliamentary by-election

The 1880 Barnstaple by-election occurred in Barnstaple, Devon on 12 February 1880. The seat was held by the Liberal Party.

== Result ==
By-election, 12 Feb 1880: Barnstaple
Party	Candidate	Votes	%	±%
Liberal	Newton Wallop	817	53.1	−1.2
Conservative	Robert Carden	721	46.9	+1.3
Majority		96	6.2	+4.2
Turnout		1,538	93.4	+10.6 (est)
Registered electors		1,646		
Liberal hold		Swing	−1.3	
