= John Dodderidge =

English lawyer and politician

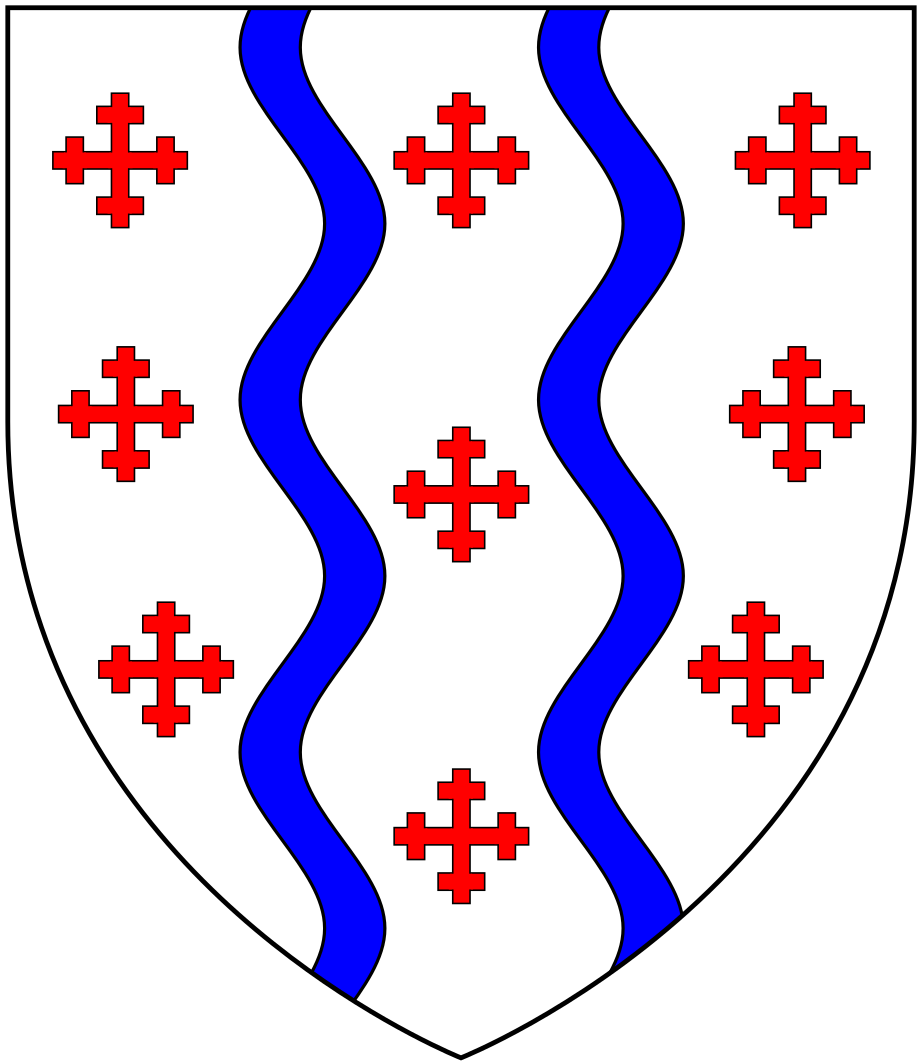
- Arms of Dodderidge: Argent, two pales wavy azure between nine cross croslets gules. These arms are visible on the monument to Sir John Doddridge (1555–1628) in the Lady Chapel of Exeter Cathedral

Member of Parliament for Devon
- In office 1656

Member of Parliament for Bristol
- In office 1656

Recorder of Barnstaple
- In office ?

Recorder of Bristol
- In office 1655

Member of Parliament for Barnstaple
- In office 1646–1653

Personal details
- Born: 1610
- Died: 1659 (aged 48–49) Cheshunt, Hertfordshire, England
- Spouse(s): Martha Dacres; Jane; Judith Gurdon
- Parent: Pentecost Dodderidge (father)
- Relatives: John Doddridge (uncle)

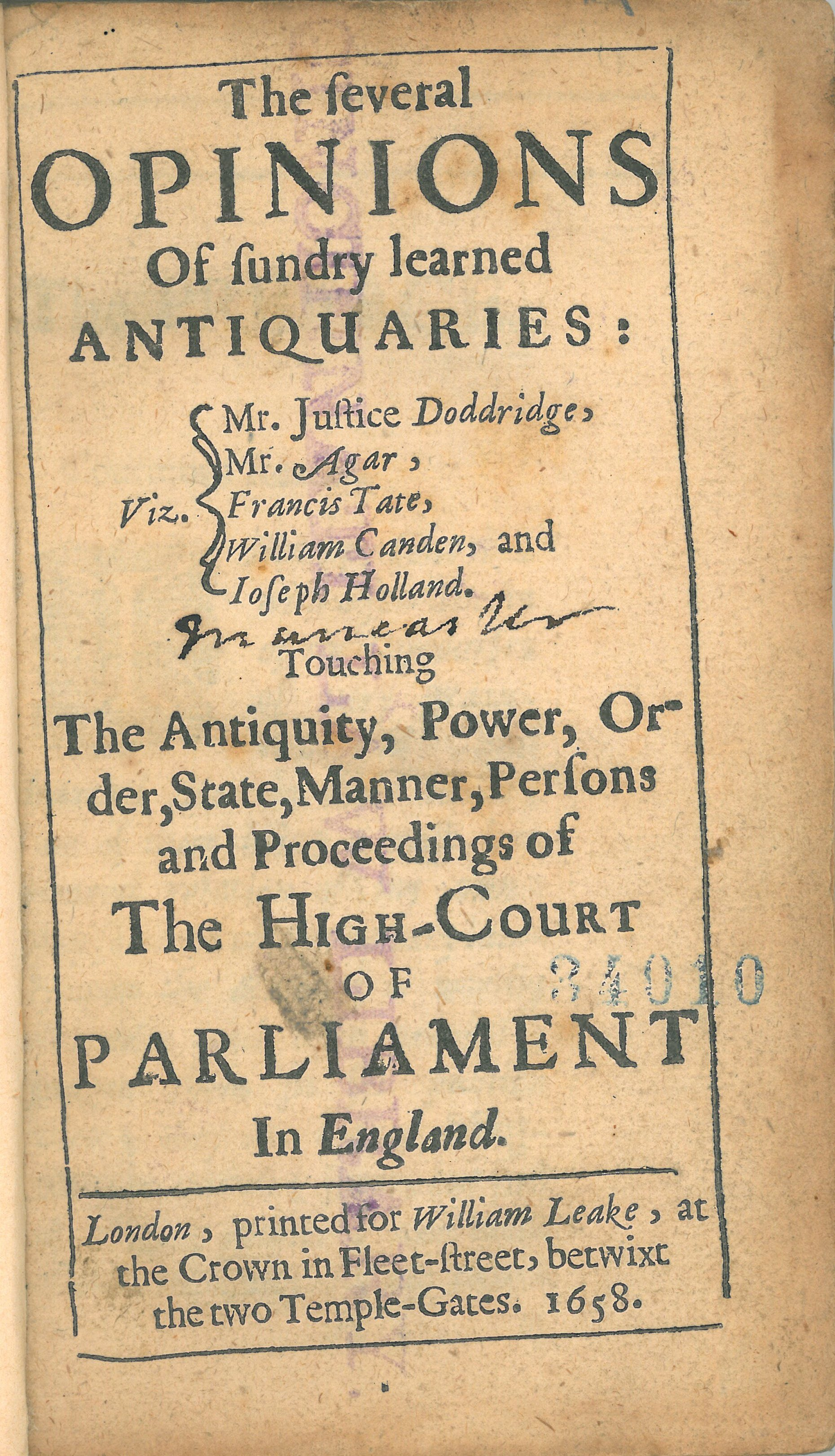
The title page of The Several Opinions of Sundry Learned Antiquaries (1658), which Dodderidge arranged to have published

John II Dodderidge (1610–1659) of Bremridge in the parish of South Molton, Devon, was a lawyer who was elected MP for Barnstaple in 1646 and 1654, for Bristol in 1656 and for Devon also in 1656, and chose to sit for Devon, but was prevented by Oliver Cromwell from taking his seat.

== Origins ==
Dodderidge was the son of Pentecost Dodderidge (died c. 1650) of Barnstaple in North Devon, thrice a Member of Parliament for Barnstaple in 1621, 1624 and 1625, by his wife Elizabeth Wescombe. Pentecost Dodderidge was the brother and heir of Sir John I Doddridge (1555–1628), a Justice of the King's Bench, who had purchased for his seat the estate of Bremridge, near South Molton, Devon.

== Career ==
Dodderidge entered Middle Temple on 26 June 1629 and was called to the bar on 19 May 1637. In 1646, he was elected as a Member of Parliament for Barnstaple in the Long Parliament. He was appointed a Justice of the Peace for Devon on 26 July 1647. He was re-elected as MP for Barnstaple in 1654 in the First Protectorate Parliament. In 1655 he was appointed Recorder of Bristol. Subsequently, he became Recorder of Barnstaple, a position of significant honour, having left pieces of plate to the corporation of Bristol. In 1656, he was elected MP for both Bristol and for Devon in the Second Protectorate Parliament and chose to sit for Devon. He was, however, prevented by Oliver Cromwell from taking his seat. He became a bencher of his Inn in 1658 and published The Opinions of Sundry Antiquaries ... Touching the Antiquity, Power, Order, State, Manner, Persons and Proceedings of the High-Court of Parliament in England.

== Marriages and progeny ==
Dodderidge married three times, but his only son John predeceased him. His wives included:

- Martha Dacres (died 1655), the youngest daughter of Sir Thomas Dacres of Cheshunt, Hertfordshire.
- Jane, of unknown family.
- Judith Gurdon, 3rd and last wife, daughter of John Gurdon (alias Richard Gurdon) of Assington Hall, Sudbury, Suffolk. She survived him and in 1665 remarried (as his 3rd wife) to John Gould (1616-1679) of Clapham, Surrey, a Levant merchant, 3rd son of William Gould of Hayes, near Exeter, Devon.

== Death ==
Dodderidge died in 1659 (his will was proved 20 June 1659) at Cheshunt at the age of about 49.

== Dodderidgian Library ==
His library became the Dodderidgian Library. He bequeathed his library to his wife Judith in the following passage of his will dated 20 January 1658: "Alsoe I leave the disposing of my library of bookes (unto) my said deare wife whome I make and ordaine sole executrix of this my last will and testament not doubting of her care in the due executing thereof...". In 1664 she gave or bequeathed the library to the Corporation of Barnstaple. The bequest was of 112 volumes, many of which were originally from the library of his uncle Sir John Dodderidge, as evidenced by his signature in several of them. The collection became known as the Bibliotheca Doddridgiana ("Dodderidgian Library"). A special building was erected to house the books at the north-east corner of the chancel of St Peter's Church, Barnstaple. The books were chiefly in Latin on the subject of theology, and include most notably a 1610 edition of John Foxe's Book of Martyrs, containing a very well preserved illustration of scenes of Protestant martyrdom. The collection was later expanded. The Dodderidge collection was removed to the North Devon Athaneum in 1888 and from there in 1957 on permanent loan to Exeter University Library. It represents one of the earliest town libraries in England which continues in existence since its foundation.

== Heirs ==
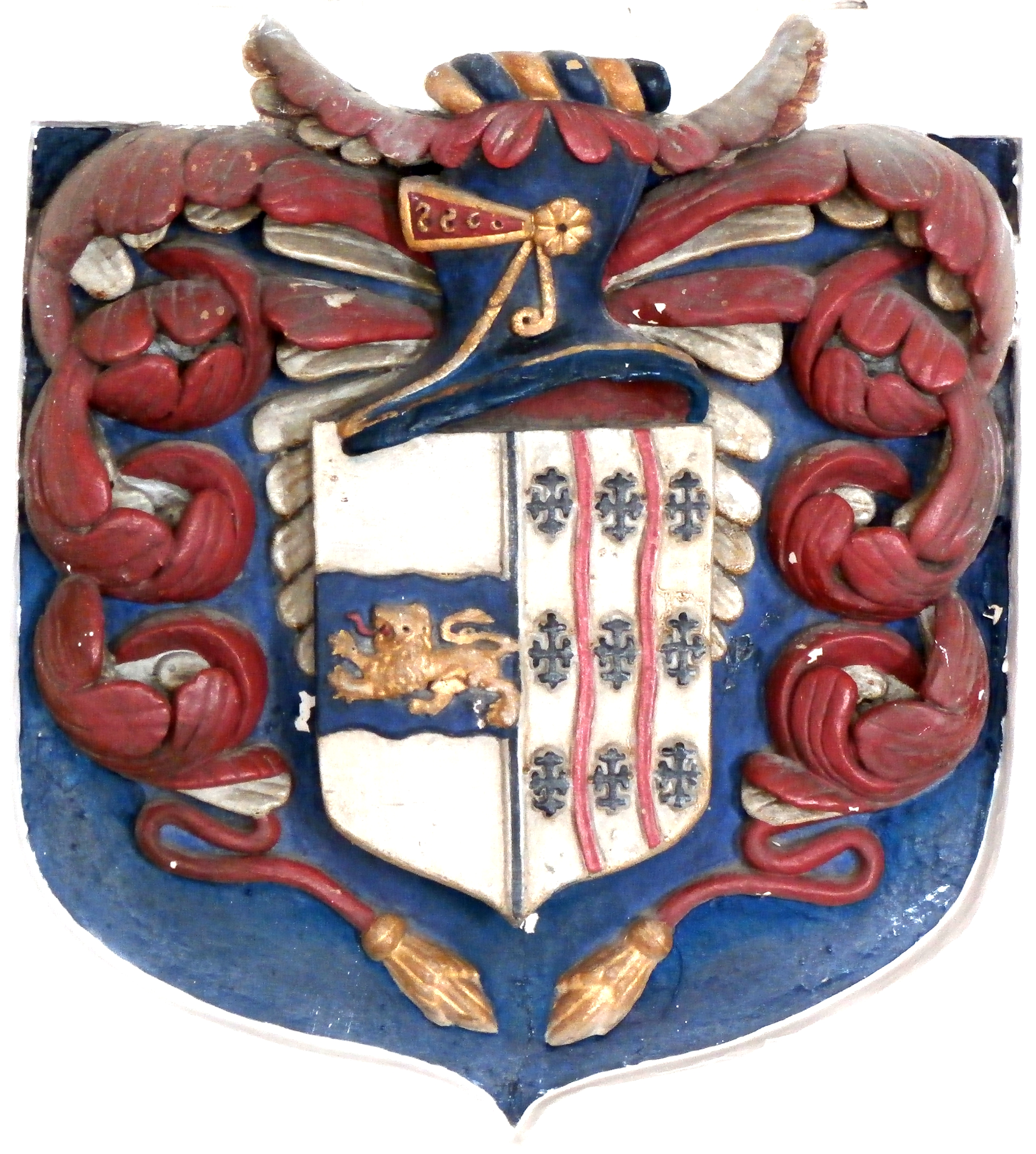
Detail from 17th-century plasterwork overmantel in hall of Hudscott House, showing the arms of Lovering of Hudscott (Argent, on a fesse wavy azure a lion passant Or) impaling Dodderidge (Argent, two pales wavy azure between nine cross croslets gules) here shown apparently with tinctures transposed. They represent the marriage of John I Lovering (died 1675) to Dorcas Doddridge, sister and co-heiress of John Doddridge (1610–1659).

As his only son predeceased him, his heirs were his two sisters, one of whom was Dorcas Doddridge, the wife of John Lovering (died 1675) "The Elder", of Weare Giffard, a merchant based at Barnstaple who served as one of his executors. John Lovering's son was John Lovering "The Younger" (died 1686) who married Elizabeth Venner daughter of William Venner of Hudscott, Chittlehampton. They made their home at Hudscott, as is evidenced by the heraldic overmantel showing the arms of Lovering impaling Doddridge.

== Will ==
John Dodderidge's will, dated 20 January 1658 and proved 20 June 1659, may be summarised thus:

"John Doddridge of Bremeridge, Devon, Esq. 20 January 1658, proved 20 June 1659. If I happen to die within thirty miles of Cheshunt, Herts, my body may be carried thither and there interred in the Vault of my honored father in law Sir Thomas Dacres of Cheshunt, knight, as near the body of my very dear virtuous and truly loving wife Martha, the youngest daughter of the said Sir Thomas Dacres, as conveniently may be, who hath promised me a burying place there according to my great desire. But if I happen to die within thirty miles of the town of Barnastaple, Devon, then I very much desire that my body may be carried to Barnstaple and buried as near the body of my dear virtuous and loving wife Jane as may be. Bequests to the town of Barnstaple, for the poor there, to the aldermen of Bristol (forty pounds) for a piece of plate with my coat of arms engraven upon it and this inscription "Ex Dono Johanni Doddridge Recordatoris Civitatis Bristoll" [i.e., "From the gift of John Dodderidge Recorder of the City of Bristol"]. To the poor of Ilfracombe, Fremington, and South Molton. My most dear wife Judith. My dear sisters Mistress Elizabeth Crossing, Mistress Dorothy Lowring [i.e., Lovering] and my nephew Master John Martin. My father in law John Gurdon Esq. and my loving brothers John Hele Esq., Thomas Dacres Esq., Robert Gurdon Esq., Master John Martin, Master Richard Crossing, Master John Lowring, Master Joseph Jackson and my friends Master Robert Aldworth, Master Edward Watts and Master Richard Sherbrook. I give and bequeath unto the College in New England towards the maintenance of scholars there the yearly sum of ten pounds forever, issuing and going forth out of my Rectory of Fremington in the County of Devon. I also give and bequeath unto the Trustees for the maintenance of select scholars at the University, according to the model drawn up by Master Poole and other godly ministers, the like yearly sum of ten pounds &c. My cousin Dorothy Watts wife of Master Edward Watts, Sarah Walker daughter of Thomas Walker minister of Assington, Suffolk. Cousin Roger Hill one of the Barons of the Exchequer. My manor of Abbotts Bury in Porbury, in the County of Somerset. My niece Jane Martin".

== Wife's monument at Cheshunt ==
A monument exists in Cheshunt Church, Hertfordshire, inscribed as follows: "To the memory of Martha Doddridge, wife of John Doddridge, of Branbridge, in the county of Devon, Esq., youngest daughter of Sir Thomas Dacres, of Hertford, Knt., who died in 1655. Many daughters have done virtuously, but thou excellest them all. (Prov. xxx. 29) This is the pillar of Rachel's grave unto this day. (Gen. xxxv. 19, 80)."

== Sources ==
- Dodderidge, Rev. Sidney E., Pedigree of Dudderigge alias Dodderidge, of Dotheridge, South Molton, and Barnstaple, Co. Devon, Devon & Cornwall Notes & Queries, vol. 3, no. 5, (1905) pp.166-169

Parliament of England
Preceded by George Peard; Richard Ferris	Member of Parliament for Barnstaple; 1646–1653; With: Philip Skippon	Succeeded by Not represented in Barebones Parliament
Preceded by Richard Aldworth; Miles Jackson	Member of Parliament for Bristol; 1656; With: Robert Aldworth	Succeeded by Robert Aldworth; Joseph Jackson
Preceded by Thomas Saunders; Robert Rolle; Arthur Upton; Thomas Reynell; William Morice; John Hale; William Bastard; William Fry; Sir John Northcote, Bt; Henry Hatsell; John Quick	Member of Parliament for Devon; 1656; With: Thomas Saunders; Robert Rolle; Arthur Upton; Thomas Reynell; William Morice; John Hale; Sir John Northcote, Bt; Henry Hatsell; Edmund Fowell; Sir John Yonge	Succeeded by Sir John Northcote, Bt; Robert Rolle
