= William Salusbury (MP) =

16th-century English politician

William Salusbury (c. 1519–1559) was an English politician.

He was a member (MP) of the parliament of England for Barnstaple in November 1554 and 1558. He was Mayor of Barnstaple in 1557–58.
