= George Peard =

English politician

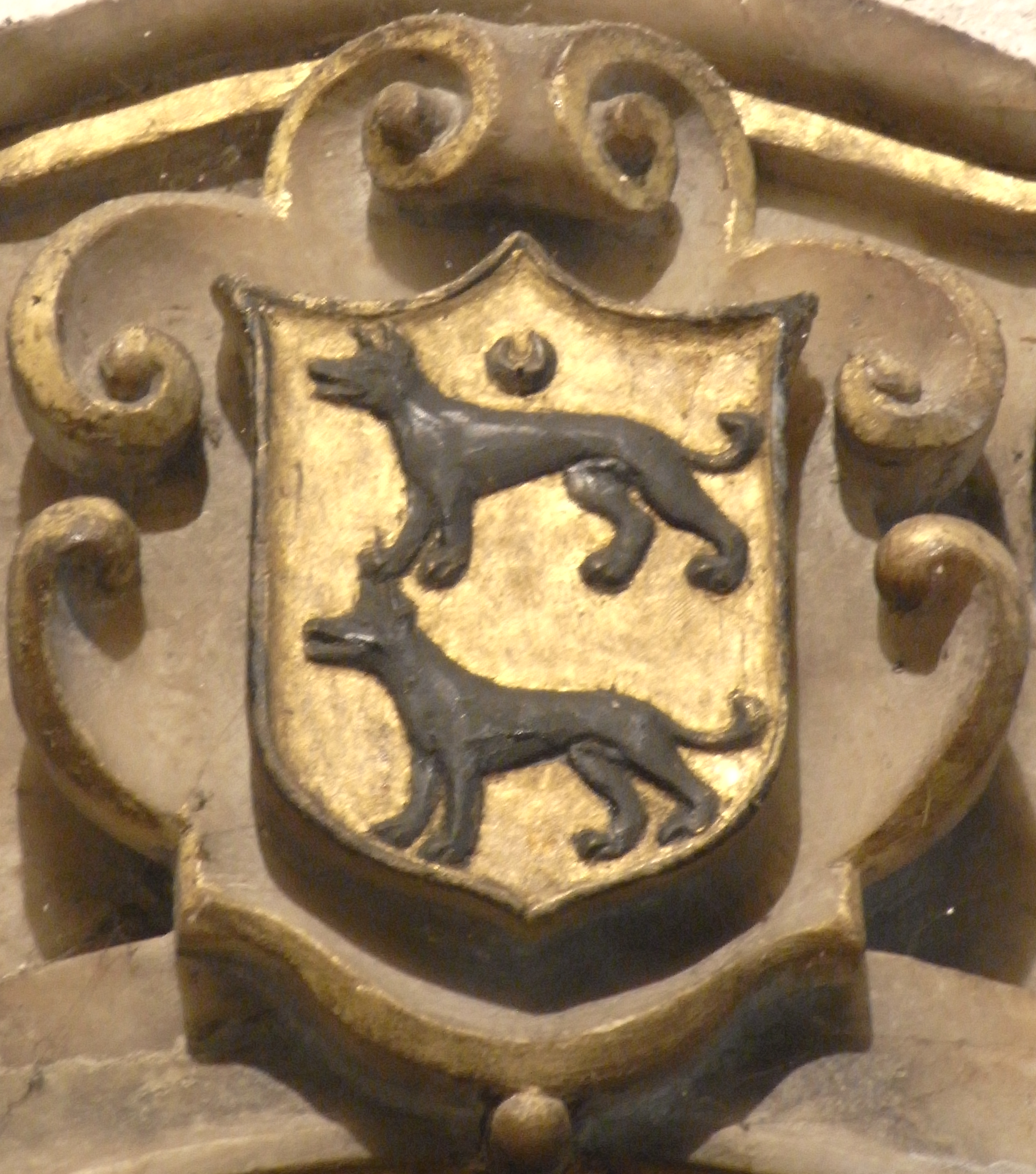
Arms of Peard: Or, two wolves passant in pale sable langued gules here shown with A crescent sable for difference. Detail from a 17th c. monument of a member of the Peard family in St Peter's Church, Barnstaple

George Peard (1594–1645) of Barnstaple in Devon, England, was a politician who sat in the House of Commons of England from 1640 to 1645. He supported the Parliamentarians in the English Civil War.

His uncle George Peard (1548-1621) was also twice a Member of Parliament for Barnstaple, in 1597 and 1604.

== Career ==
Peard was a lawyer and a member of the Middle Temple. In April 1640 he was elected as one of the two Members of Parliament for Barnstaple, for the Short Parliament. He was re-elected in November 1640 for the Long Parliament and remained a Member until his death in 1645. Peard was active in the proceedings against Thomas Wentworth, 1st Earl of Strafford in 1641. He assisted in the unsuccessful defence of Barnstaple in 1643, during the Civil War.

== Death and monument ==
Peard died in 1645 at the age of 51. His monument with alabaster effigy was said in 1882 to survive in St Peter's Church in Barnstaple, as did several others of the Peard family. He is shown as an effigy in half-figure, "very quaintly attired" and wearing the black tasseled gown of the period, exactly as worn by the Town Clerk of Barnstaple in 1882. His right arm rests on a skull, his left on a closed book, a common pose for several contemporaneous effigies in that church. The effigy was sculpted from white Derbyshire alabaster, which had been "daubed thickly with paint" but was stripped back to the white stone during the church restoration shortly before 1882. The Latin inscription was translated as follows:

Here lieth the body of George Peard, a soldier of Christ, under whose banner he fought against the world, the flesh and the Devil, who having finished his warfare, under a Captain who was witness of the battle and Author of the victory, now lives crowned with happiness, supplicating for a victory to the arms of his fellow soldiers in the flesh, that in their success his joy might be perfected. He put on his triumphal robe in the year of his Captain, 1644, of his warfare, 50.

Parliament of England
Vacant Parliament suspended since 1629	Member of Parliament for Barnstaple; 1640–1645; With: Thomas Matthew 1640; Richard Ferris 1640-	Succeeded by Philip Skippon; John Dodderidge
