= Alfred Wonston =

English politician

Alfred Wonston or Wolston (fl. 1407–1426) of Newton Abbot, Devon, was an English politician.

He was a member (MP) of the parliament of England for Totnes in 1407, for Barnstaple in 1410 and 1411, and for Tavistock in 1426.
