= Barnstaple (constituency) =

Former parliamentary constituency in the United Kingdom

- Former county constituency for the House of Commons
- Context: 1918-1950. Extract from 1935 result: the main yellow area at north (top) Barnstaple in Devon 1885-1918

1885–1950
- Seats: one
- Replaced by: North Devon and Torrington

1295–1885
- Seats: two
- Type of constituency: County constituency

Barnstaple was a constituency centred on the town of Barnstaple in Devon, in the South West of England. It returned two Members of Parliament to the House of Commons of England until 1707, House of Commons of Great Britain until 1800 and the House of Commons of the Parliament of the United Kingdom until 1885, thereafter, one.

It was created in 1295 and abolished for the 1950 general election. Most of the area and the town falls into the North Devon seat.

== Boundaries ==
1885–1918: The Municipal Boroughs of Barnstaple and Bideford, and the Sessional Divisions of Bideford and Braunton.

1918–1950: The Municipal Boroughs of Barnstaple and Bideford, the Urban Districts of Ilfracombe, Lynton, and Northam, and the Rural Districts of Barnstaple and Bideford (including Lundy Island).

== Members of Parliament ==
=== 1295–1885 ===
Year	First member	First party	Second member	Second party
1372	Thomas Raymond			
Jan. 1377	Thomas Raymond			
Oct. 1377	Thomas Raymond			
1385	John Grey			
1386	John Bidewell		Jocelin Antony	
February 1388	Thomas Norris II		William Long	
September 1388	John Sampford		Roger Rede	
January 1390	Thomas Norris II		Robert Crook	
1391	John Aston		Robert Cobbley	
1393	Richard Colecote		John Herberd	
1394	Thomas Norris II		John Bidewell	
1395	Thomas Norris II		John Bidewell	
January 1397	Robert Napton		Thomas Holman	
1399	Thomas Hoper		Walter Spencer	
1402	Robert Napton		John But	
1406	Thomas Holman alias Pyers		John Luttrell	
1407	John Bakwell		John Hunt	
1410	Alfred Wonston		John Foxley	
1411	Nicholas Broomford		Alfred Wonston	
May 1413	Thomas Haseley		John Broomford	
November 1414	John Pyne		John Walwyn	
1420	William Weldo		Walter Prideaux	
May 1421	John More II		Richard Wood	
December 1421	John Cokeworthy II		Sir John Trebell	
1427	Sir John Trebell			
1512	John Culme		John Goddisland	
1515	John Goddisland		?	
1529	Hugh Yeo		Anthony Bury	
1542	George Rolle		?	
1545	George Rolle		George Haydon	
1547	Sir James Wilford died 1550 and repl. by Sir Arthur Champernowne		Bartholemew Traheron	
1553 (Mar)	William Gardiner		Thomas Prideaux	
1553 (Oct)	Robert Carey		Roger Worthe	
1554 (Apr)	Sir John Pollard		George Ferrers	
1554 (Nov)	Robert Apley		William Salusbury	
1555	Robert Apley		George Stapleton	
1558	Richard Skinner		William Salusbury	
1558–9	Sir John Chichester		John Darte	
1562–3	Arthur Bassett		Robert Apley	
1571	Peter Wentworth		Robert Apley	
1572	Vincent Skinner		Robert Apley	
1584	John Peryam		Robert Prowse	
1586	Thomas Hinson		Lewis Darte	
1588	Thomas Hinson		John Doddridge	
1593	George Chittinge		Richard Leye	
1597	Thomas Hinson		George Peard	
1601	Richard Martin		Edward Hancock	
1604	Thomas Hinson		George Peard	
1614	John Gostlin		John Delbridge	
1621	John Delbridge		Pentecost Dodderidge	
1624	John Delbridge		Pentecost Dodderidge	
1625	John Delbridge		Pentecost Dodderidge	
1626	Sir Alexander St John		John Delbridge	
1628	Sir Alexander St John		John Delbridge	
1640 April	George Peard		Thomas Matthew	
1640 November	George Peard		Richard Ferris	
	Peard died; Ferrers disabled			
1646	Philip Skippon		John Dodderidge	
1653	Not represented in Barebones Parliament			
1654	John Dodderidge			
1656	Sir John Coppleston			
1659	Sir John Coppleston		George Walters	
1660	John Rolle		Nicholas Dennys	
1661	Sir John Chichester, of Raleigh		Nicholas Dennys	
1667	Sir John Northcote		Nicholas Dennys	
1677	John Basset		Nicholas Dennys	
February 1679	John Basset		Sir Hugh Acland	Tory
October 1679	John Basset		Arthur Acland	
1680	John Basset		Richard Lee	
1685	John Basset		Sir Arthur Chichester	
1689	Richard Lee		Sir Arthur Chichester	
1690	Sir George Hutchins		Arthur Champneys	
1695	Sir Nicholas Hooper	Tory	Arthur Champneys	
1705	Sir Nicholas Hooper	Tory	Samuel Rolle	
1708	Sir Nicholas Hooper	Tory	Richard Acland	
1713	Sir Nicholas Hooper	Tory	Sir Arthur Chichester	
1715	John Rolle		Sir Arthur Chichester	
1718	John Rolle		John Basset	
1721	John Rolle		Sir Hugh Acland	
1722	Lieutenant-General Thomas Whetham		Sir Hugh Acland	
1727	Richard Coffin	Whig	Theophilus Fortescue	Whig
1734	Sir John Chichester	Tory	Theophilus Fortescue	Whig
1740	John Basset		Theophilus Fortescue	Whig
1741	John Harris		Henry Rolle	
1747	Thomas Benson		Henry Rolle	
1748	Thomas Benson		Sir Bourchier Wrey	
1754	John Harris	Whig	George Amyand	Whig
1761	Denys Rolle		George Amyand	Whig
1766	Denys Rolle		John Clevland	Whig
1774	William Devaynes	Tory	John Clevland	Whig
1780	Francis Basset		John Clevland	Whig
1784	William Devaynes	Tory	John Clevland	Whig
1796	Richard Wilson	Whig	John Clevland	Whig
1802	William Devaynes	Tory	Captain Sir Edward Pellew	Tory
1804	William Devaynes	Tory	Viscount Ebrington	Whig
1806	William Taylor	Tory	Viscount Ebrington	Whig
1807	William Taylor	Tory	George Woodford Thellusson	Tory
January 1812	William Taylor	Tory	William Busk	Whig
October 1812	Sir Manasseh Masseh Lopes	Tory	Sir Eyre Coote	Tory
1818	Sir Manasseh Masseh Lopes	Tory	Francis Ommanney	Tory
1820	Michael Nolan	Tory	Francis Ommanney	Tory
1824	Frederick Hodgson	Tory	Francis Ommanney	Tory
1826	Frederick Hodgson	Tory	Henry Alexander	Tory
1830	Stephens Lyne-Stephens	Tory	George Tudor	Tory
1831	Frederick Hodgson	Tory	John Chichester	Whig
1832	Charles St John Fancourt	Tory	John Chichester	Whig
1834	Charles St John Fancourt	Conservative	John Chichester	Whig
1837	Frederick Hodgson	Conservative	John Chichester	Whig
1841	Frederick Hodgson	Conservative	Montague Gore	Conservative
1847	Richard Bremridge	Conservative	Hon. John Fortescue	Whig
1852	Richard Bremridge	Conservative	Sir William Fraser	Conservative
1854	John Laurie	Conservative	Richard Samuel Guinness	Conservative
1855	George Stucley	Conservative	Richard Samuel Guinness	Conservative
1857	John Laurie	Conservative	Sir William Fraser	Conservative
1859	John Ferguson Davie	Liberal	George Potts	Liberal
1863	John Ferguson Davie	Liberal	Thomas Lloyd	Liberal
1864	John Ferguson Davie	Liberal	Richard Bremridge	Conservative
1865	Sir George Stucley	Conservative	Thomas Cave	Liberal
1868	Charles Henry Williams	Conservative	Thomas Cave	Liberal
1874	Samuel Danks Waddy	Liberal	Thomas Cave	Liberal
February 1880	Newton Wallop	Liberal	Thomas Cave	Liberal
April 1880	Newton Wallop	Liberal	Sir Robert Carden	Conservative
1885	Representation reduced to one member			

=== 1885–1950 ===
Year	Member	Party
1885	George Pitt-Lewis	Liberal
1886	George Pitt-Lewis	Liberal Unionist
1892	Alfred Billson	Liberal
1895	Cameron Gull	Liberal Unionist
1900	Ernest Soares	Liberal
1911	Godfrey Baring	Liberal
1918	Tudor Rees	Liberal
1922	Basil Peto	Conservative
1923	Tudor Rees	Liberal
1924	Basil Peto	Unionist
1935	Richard Acland	Liberal
1942	Richard Acland	Common Wealth
1945	Christopher Peto	Conservative
1950	constituency abolished	

== Election results ==
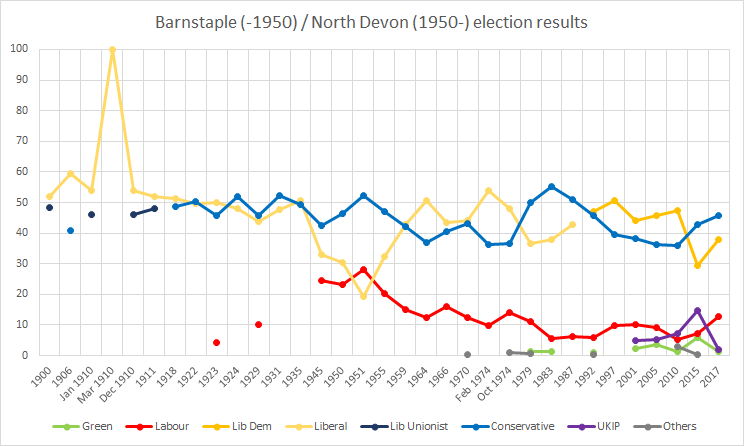
Barnstaple and North Devon historical election results

=== Elections in the 1830s ===
General election 1830: Barnstaple
Party	Candidate	Votes	%	±%
Tory	Stephens Lyne-Stephens	370	39.0	
Tory	George Tudor	332	35.0	
Tory	Colin Campbell	246	25.9	
Majority		86	9.1	
Turnout		522		
Tory hold		Swing		
Tory hold		Swing		

General election 1831: Barnstaple
Party	Candidate	Votes	%	±%
Tory	Frederick Hodgson	245	37.9	N/A
Whig	John Chichester	218	33.7	New
Tory	George Tudor	183	28.3	−6.7
Turnout		381		
Majority		27	4.2	−4.9
Tory hold		Swing	N/A	
Majority		35	5.4	N/A
Whig gain from Tory		Swing	N/A	

General election 1832: Barnstaple
Party	Candidate	Votes	%	±%
Whig	John Chichester	519	42.5	+8.8
Tory	Charles St. John Fancourt	349	28.6	−37.6
Radical	Thomas Northmore	225	18.4	N/A
Whig	George Hervey	129	10.6	N/A
Turnout		684	95.0	
Registered electors		720		
Majority		170	13.9	+8.5
Whig hold		Swing	−5.0	
Majority		124	10.1	+5.9
Tory hold		Swing	−21.0	

General election 1835: Barnstaple
Party	Candidate	Votes	%	±%
Whig	John Chichester	542	44.9	+2.4
Conservative	Charles St. John Fancourt	528	43.7	+15.1
Whig	James Stewart	134	11.1	+0.5
Conservative	J Woolley	3	0.2	N/A
Turnout		748	94.7	−0.3
Registered electors		790		
Majority		14	1.2	−12.7
Whig hold		Swing	−2.6	
Majority		394	32.6	+22.5
Conservative hold		Swing	+6.8	

General election 1837: Barnstaple
Party	Candidate	Votes	%	±%
Whig	John Chichester	387	35.5	−20.5
Conservative	Frederick Hodgson	356	32.6	−11.1
Conservative	William Best	348	31.9	+20.8
Majority		31	2.9	+1.7
Turnout		666	83.9	−10.8
Registered electors		794		
Whig hold		Swing	−12.3	
Conservative hold		Swing	−0.4	

=== Elections in the 1840s ===
General election 1841: Barnstaple
Party	Candidate	Votes	%	±%
Conservative	Frederick Hodgson	360	25.8	−6.8
Conservative	Montague Gore	349	25.0	−39.5
Whig	John Fortescue	346	24.7	+7.0
Whig	John Chichester	343	24.5	+6.8
Majority		6	0.5	N/A
Turnout		701	86.9	+3.0
Registered electors		771		
Conservative hold		Swing	−6.9	
Conservative gain from Whig		Swing	−23.2	

General election 1847: Barnstaple
Party	Candidate	Votes	%	±%
Conservative	Richard Bremridge	464	38.2	+13.2
Whig	John Fortescue	396	32.6	+6.8
Conservative	Frederick Hodgson	356	29.3	−19.9
Turnout		608 (est)	77.8 (est)	−9.1
Registered electors		781		
Majority		68	5.6	+5.1
Conservative hold		Swing	+4.9	
Majority		40	3.3	N/A
Whig gain from Conservative		Swing	+6.8	

=== Elections in the 1850s ===
General election 1852: Barnstaple
Party	Candidate	Votes	%	±%
Conservative	William Fraser	406	35.9	+6.6
Conservative	Richard Bremridge	393	34.7	−3.5
Whig	Hugh Fortescue	332	29.4	−3.2
Majority		74	6.5	N/A
Turnout		732 (est)	94.9 (est)	+16.1
Registered electors		771		
Conservative hold		Swing	+4.1	
Conservative gain from Whig		Swing	−1.0	

The election was declared void on petition, due to bribery, causing a by-election.

By-election, 25 August 1854: Barnstaple
Party	Candidate	Votes	%	±%
Conservative	John Laurie	333	35.4	−0.5
Conservative	Richard Samuel Guinness	323	34.3	−0.4
Whig	William Tite	286	30.4	+1.0
Majority		37	3.9	−2.6
Turnout		614 (est)	78.3 (est)	−16.6
Registered electors		784		
Conservative hold		Swing	−0.5	
Conservative hold		Swing	−0.5	

Laurie's election was declared void on petition, due to bribery, causing a by-election.

By-election, 10 March 1855: Barnstaple
Party	Candidate	Votes	%	±%
Conservative	George Buck	Unopposed		
Conservative hold				

General election 1857: Barnstaple
Party	Candidate	Votes	%	±%
Conservative	William Fraser	344	34.7	−1.2
Conservative	John Laurie	252	25.4	−9.3
Radical	James Taylor	180	18.2	N/A
Peelite	George Potts	179	18.1	N/A
Conservative	Henry Thoby Prinsep	36	3.6	N/A
Majority		72	7.3	+0.8
Turnout		496 (est)	66.8 (est)	−28.1
Registered electors		742		
Conservative hold		Swing	N/A	
Conservative hold		Swing	N/A	

- Prinsep withdrew from the election during polling.

General election 1859: Barnstaple
Party	Candidate	Votes	%	±%
Liberal	John Ferguson Davie	348	34.0	+15.8
Liberal	George Potts	266	26.0	+7.9
Conservative	George Stucley	210	20.5	−4.9
Conservative	William Fraser	199	19.5	−15.2
Majority		56	5.5	N/A
Turnout		512 (est)	73.8 (est)	+7.0
Registered electors		693		
Liberal gain from Conservative		Swing	+12.9	
Liberal gain from Conservative		Swing	+9.0	

=== Elections in the 1860s ===
Potts' death caused a by-election.

By-election, 20 Oct 1863: Barnstaple
Party	Candidate	Votes	%	±%
Liberal	Thomas Lloyd	305	51.8	−8.2
Conservative	Richard Bremridge	284	48.2	+8.2
Majority		21	3.6	−1.9
Turnout		589	79.8	+6.0
Registered electors		738		
Liberal hold		Swing	−8.2	

On petition, Lloyd's election was declared void due to bribery and, on 15 April 1864, Bremridge was declared elected.

General election 1865: Barnstaple
Party	Candidate	Votes	%	±%
Conservative	George Stucley	364	28.9	+8.4
Liberal	Thomas Cave	331	26.3	−7.7
Conservative	Howell Gwyn	302	24.0	+4.5
Liberal	Henry Hawkins	262	20.8	−5.2
Turnout		630 (est)	88.0 (est)	+14.2
Registered electors		715		
Majority		102	8.1	N/A
Conservative gain from Liberal		Swing	+7.4	
Majority		29	2.3	−3.2
Liberal hold		Swing	−7.1	

General election 1868: Barnstaple
Party	Candidate	Votes	%	±%
Liberal	Thomas Cave	791	35.2	+8.9
Conservative	Charles Henry Williams	788	35.1	−17.8
Liberal	William Herbert Evans	667	29.7	+8.9
Turnout		1,517 (est)	95.1 (est)	+7.1
Registered electors		1,596		
Majority		3	0.1	−2.2
Liberal hold		Swing	+8.9	
Majority		121	5.4	+2.8
Conservative hold		Swing	−8.9	

=== Elections in the 1870s ===
General election 1874: Barnstaple
Party	Candidate	Votes	%	±%
Liberal	Thomas Cave	757	28.7	−6.5
Liberal	Samuel Danks Waddy	675	25.6	−4.1
Conservative	John Fleming	622	23.6	+6.0
Conservative	John Holt	580	22.0	+4.4
Majority		53	2.0	N/A
Turnout		1,317 (est)	82.8 (est)	−12.3
Registered electors		1,591		
Liberal hold		Swing	−5.5	
Liberal gain from Conservative		Swing	−5.1	

=== Elections in the 1880s ===
Waddy resigned in order to contest Sheffield, causing a by-election.

By-election, 12 Feb 1880: Barnstaple
Party	Candidate	Votes	%	±%
Liberal	Newton Wallop	817	53.1	−1.2
Conservative	Robert Carden	721	46.9	+1.3
Majority		96	6.2	+4.2
Turnout		1,538	93.4	+10.6 (est)
Registered electors		1,646		
Liberal hold		Swing	−1.3	

General election 1880: Barnstaple (two seats)
Party	Candidate	Votes	%	±%
Conservative	Robert Carden	856	35.9	+12.3
Liberal	Newton Wallop	811	34.0	+5.3
Liberal	Henry Grenfell	720	30.2	+4.6
Majority		136	5.7	N/A
Turnout		1,194 (est)	72.5 (est)	−10.3 (est)
Registered electors		1,646		
Conservative gain from Liberal		Swing	+3.5	
Liberal hold		Swing	−0.8	

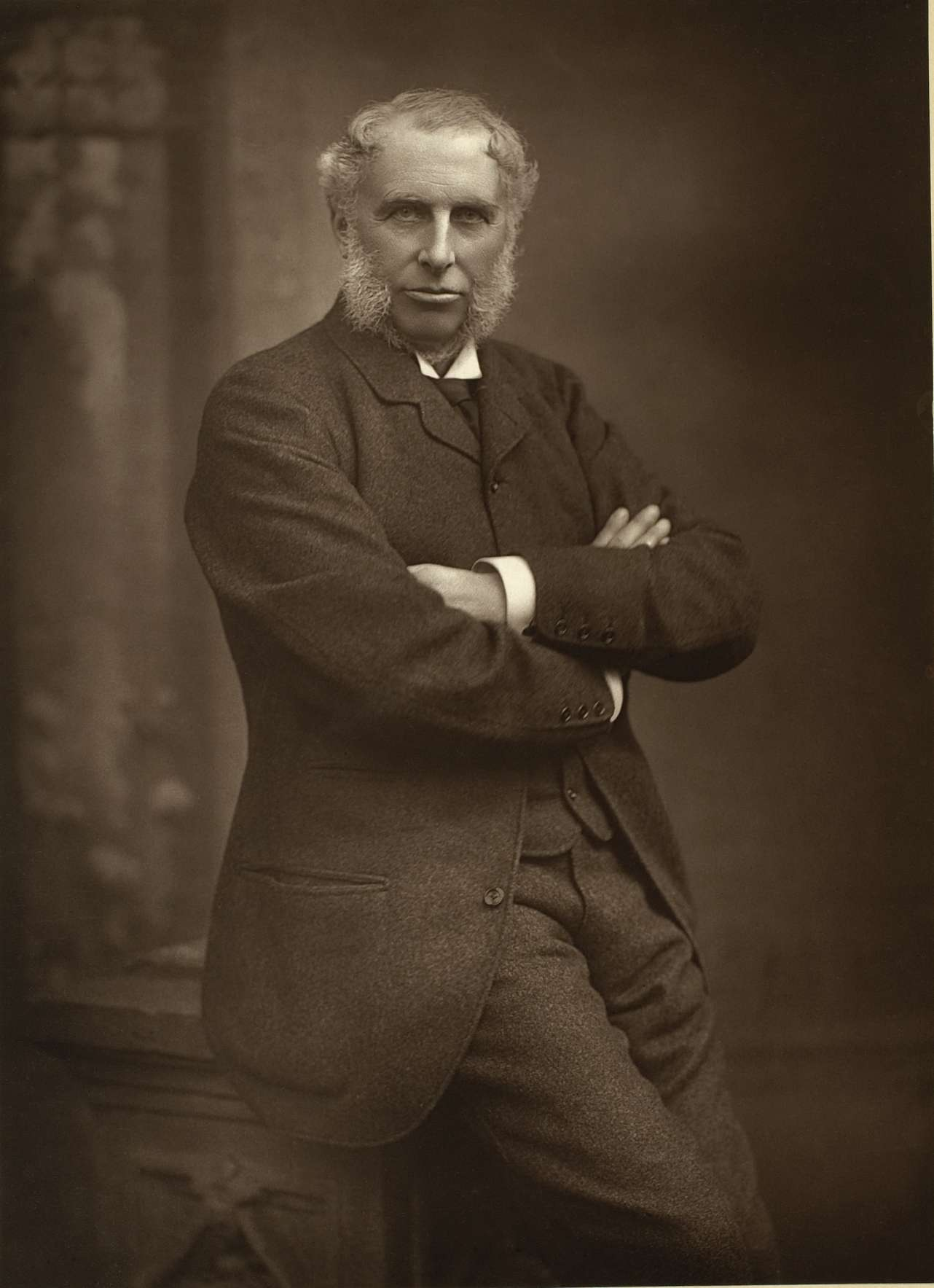
Kekewich

General election 1885: Barnstaple
Party	Candidate	Votes	%	±%
Liberal	George Pitt-Lewis	4,577	55.1	−9.1
Conservative	Arthur Kekewich	3,734	44.9	+9.0
Majority		843	10.2	N/A
Turnout		8,311	81.6	+9.1 (est)
Registered electors		10,189		
Liberal win				

General election 1886: Barnstaple
Party	Candidate	Votes	%	±%
Liberal Unionist	George Pitt-Lewis	4,222	58.8	+13.9
Liberal	Isaac Leadam	2,960	41.2	−13.9
Majority		1,262	17.6	N/A
Turnout		7,182	70.5	−11.1
Registered electors		10,189		
Liberal Unionist gain from Liberal		Swing	+13.9	

=== Elections in the 1890s ===
Billson

General election 1892: Barnstaple
Party	Candidate	Votes	%	±%
Liberal	Alfred Billson	4,383	50.9	+9.7
Liberal Unionist	W Leedham White	4,236	49.1	−9.7
Majority		147	1.8	N/A
Turnout		8,619	82.5	+12.0
Registered electors		10,442		
Liberal gain from Liberal Unionist		Swing	+9.7	

Gull

General election 1895: Barnstaple
Party	Candidate	Votes	%	±%
Liberal Unionist	Cameron Gull	4,825	51.2	+2.1
Liberal	Alfred Billson	4,593	48.8	−2.1
Majority		232	2.4	N/A
Turnout		9,418	86.5	+4.0
Registered electors		10,885		
Liberal Unionist gain from Liberal		Swing	+2.1	

=== Elections in the 1900s ===
Soares

General election 1900: Barnstaple
Party	Candidate	Votes	%	±%
Liberal	Ernest Soares	5,007	51.8	+3.0
Liberal Unionist	Cameron Gull	4,660	48.2	−3.0
Majority		347	3.6	N/A
Turnout		9,667	81.1	−5.4
Registered electors		11,916		
Liberal gain from Liberal Unionist		Swing	+3.0	

Horne

General election 1906: Barnstaple
Party	Candidate	Votes	%	±%
Liberal	Ernest Soares	6,510	59.3	+7.5
Conservative	Edgar Horne	4,465	40.7	−7.5
Majority		2,045	18.6	+15.0
Turnout		10,975	85.0	+3.9
Registered electors		12,908		
Liberal hold		Swing	+7.5	

=== Elections in the 1910s ===
General election January 1910: Barnstaple
Party	Candidate	Votes	%	±%
Liberal	Ernest Soares	6,236	53.8	−5.5
Liberal Unionist	George Borwick, 2nd Baron Borwick	5,354	46.2	+5.5
Majority		882	7.6	−11.0
Turnout		11,590	88.3	+3.3
Liberal hold		Swing	−5.5	

By-election, March 1910: Barnstaple
Party	Candidate	Votes	%	±%
Liberal	Ernest Soares	Unopposed		
Liberal hold				

General election December 1910: Barnstaple
Party	Candidate	Votes	%	±%
Liberal	Ernest Soares	6,047	54.0	+0.2
Liberal Unionist	Charles Sandbach Parker	5,155	46.0	−0.2
Majority		892	8.0	+0.4
Turnout		11,202	85.3	−3.0
Liberal hold		Swing	+0.2	

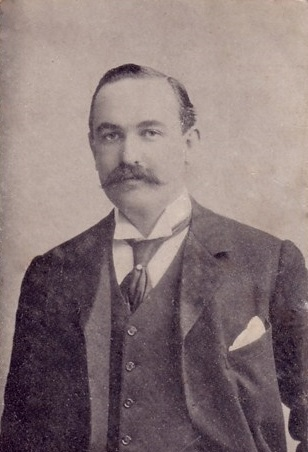
Baring

1911 Barnstaple by-election
Party	Candidate	Votes	%	±%
Liberal	Godfrey Baring	6,239	52.0	−2.0
Liberal Unionist	Charles Sandbach Parker	5,751	48.0	+2.0
Majority		488	4.0	−4.0
Turnout		11,990	88.2	+2.9
Liberal hold		Swing	−2.0	

General election 1914–15:

Another general election was required to take place before the end of 1915. The political parties had been making preparations for an election to take place and by the July 1914, the following candidates had been selected;

- Liberal:
- Unionist: Charles Sandbach Parker

General election 1918: Barnstaple
Party	Candidate	Votes	%	±%
Liberal	Tudor Rees	11,281	51.4	−2.6
Unionist	Charles Sandbach Parker	10,679	48.6	+2.6
Majority		602	2.8	−5.2
Turnout		21,960	69.1	−16.2
Liberal hold		Swing		

Both candidates supported the Coalition Government; Rees may have received its endorsement.

=== Elections in the 1920s ===
General election 1922: Barnstaple
Party	Candidate	Votes	%	±%
Unionist	Basil Peto	13,793	50.3	+1.7
Liberal	Tudor Rees	13,619	49.7	−1.7
Majority		174	0.6	N/A
Turnout		27,412	83.1	+14.0
Unionist gain from Liberal		Swing	+1.7	

General election 1923: Barnstaple
Party	Candidate	Votes	%	±%
Liberal	Tudor Rees	14,880	50.1	+0.4
Unionist	Basil Peto	13,614	45.8	−4.5
Labour	Richard W. Gifford	1,225	4.1	New
Majority		1,266	4.3	N/A
Turnout		29,719	87.6	+4.5
Liberal gain from Unionist		Swing	+2.5	

General election 1924: Barnstaple
Party	Candidate	Votes	%	±%
Unionist	Basil Peto	15,479	52.0	+6.2
Liberal	Tudor Rees	14,284	48.0	−2.1
Majority		1,195	4.0	N/A
Turnout		29,763	85.9	−1.7
Unionist gain from Liberal		Swing	+4.1	

General election 1929: Barnstaple
Party	Candidate	Votes	%	±%
Unionist	Basil Peto	17,382	45.9	−6.1
Liberal	David Marshall Mason	16,593	43.9	−4.1
Labour	Donald Evan Mullins	3,864	10.2	New
Majority		789	2.0	−2.0
Turnout		37,839		
Unionist hold		Swing	−1.0	

=== Elections in the 1930s ===
General election 1931: Barnstaple
Party	Candidate	Votes	%	±%
Conservative	Basil Peto	20,028	52.2	+6.3
Liberal	Richard Acland	18,318	47.8	+3.9
Majority		1,710	4.4	+2.4
Turnout		38,346	86.3	
Conservative hold		Swing	+1.2	

General election 1935: Barnstaple
Party	Candidate	Votes	%	±%
Liberal	Richard Acland	19,432	50.6	+2.8
Conservative	Benjamin Lampard-Vachell	18,978	49.4	−2.8
Majority		454	1.2	N/A
Turnout		38,410	83.8	−2.5
Liberal gain from Conservative		Swing		

General election 1939–40:

Another general election was required to take place before the end of 1940. The political parties had been making preparations for an election to take place and by the Autumn of 1939, the following candidates had been selected;

- Liberal: Richard Acland
- Conservative: Marjorie Graves

=== Elections in the 1940s ===
General election 1945: Barnstaple
Party	Candidate	Votes	%	±%
Conservative	Christopher Peto	17,822	42.6	−6.8
Liberal	Mark Bonham Carter	13,752	32.9	−17.7
Labour	Ivor Arthur Jack Williams	10,237	24.5	New
Majority		4,070	9.7	N/A
Turnout		41,811	75.8	−8.0
Conservative gain from Liberal		Swing		
