= William Branthwaite =

English scholar and translator (1563–1619)

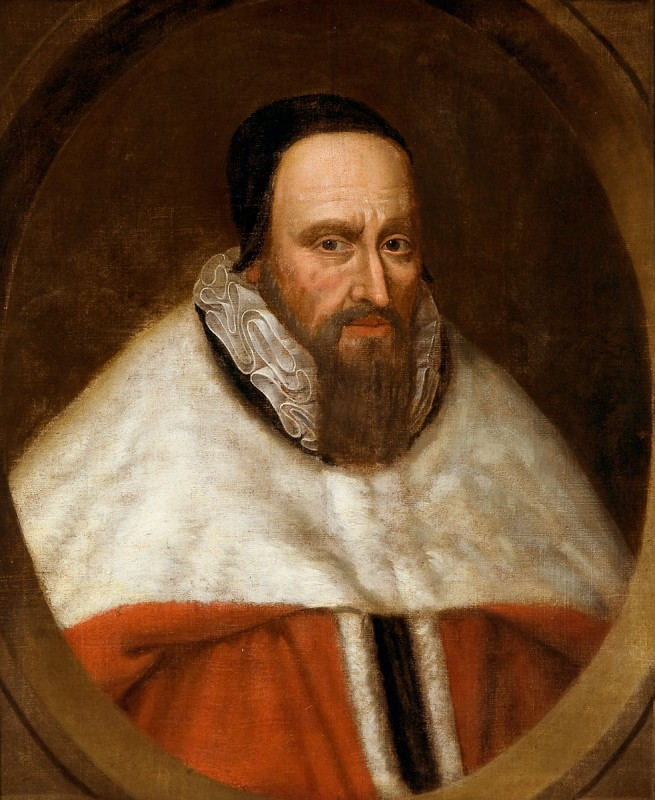
William Branthwaite

William Branthwaite (1563–1619) was an English scholar and translator.

The son of John Branthwaite, William Branthwaite was baptised at St Peter Mancroft, Norwich on 13 June 1563.

Branthwaite entered Clare Hall, Cambridge in 1579, graduating B.A. in 1582–3, M.A. in 1586 (from Emmanuel College, incorporated M.A. at Oxford in 1594), B.D. in 1593, D.D. in 1598. He was a Fellow of the newly founded Emmanuel College 1585–1607, under Laurence Chaderton. In 1607 he was appointed Master of Gonville and Caius College by royal mandate. He was the first of eighteen members of his family at Caius. Having an extensive knowledge of Hebrew, he served in the "Second Cambridge Company" charged by King James with translating the Apocrypha for the King James Version of the Bible. He died, whilst Vice-Chancellor, in January 1619.

Academic offices
Preceded by Thomas Legge	Master of Gonville and Caius College; 1609-1619	Succeeded by John Gostlin
