= Jocelin Antony =

English politician

Jocelin Antony (died before August 1396) was an English politician. He sat as MP for Barnstaple in 1386 and Mayor of Barnstaple from Michaelmas 1380 till 1381 and 1385 till 1387.

He also served as commissioner of inquiry in Devon in July 1387 concerning a shipwreck and commissioner to confiscate cloth in Devon in May 1389.

He married a woman named Joan.
