= George Stapleton (MP) =

16th-century English politician

- Born: 1519
- Died: 1561/1568
- Occupation: English Politician

George Stapleton (by 1519 – 1561/68) was an English politician.

He was a member (MP) of the parliament of England for Barnstaple in 1555.
