= William Gardiner (MP died 1558) =

English politician

William Gardiner (1522–1558) was an English politician.

He was a member (MP) of the parliament of England for Barnstaple in March 1553.
