= Newton Wallop, 6th Earl of Portsmouth =

British politician

The Right Honourable The Earl of Portsmouth JP DL
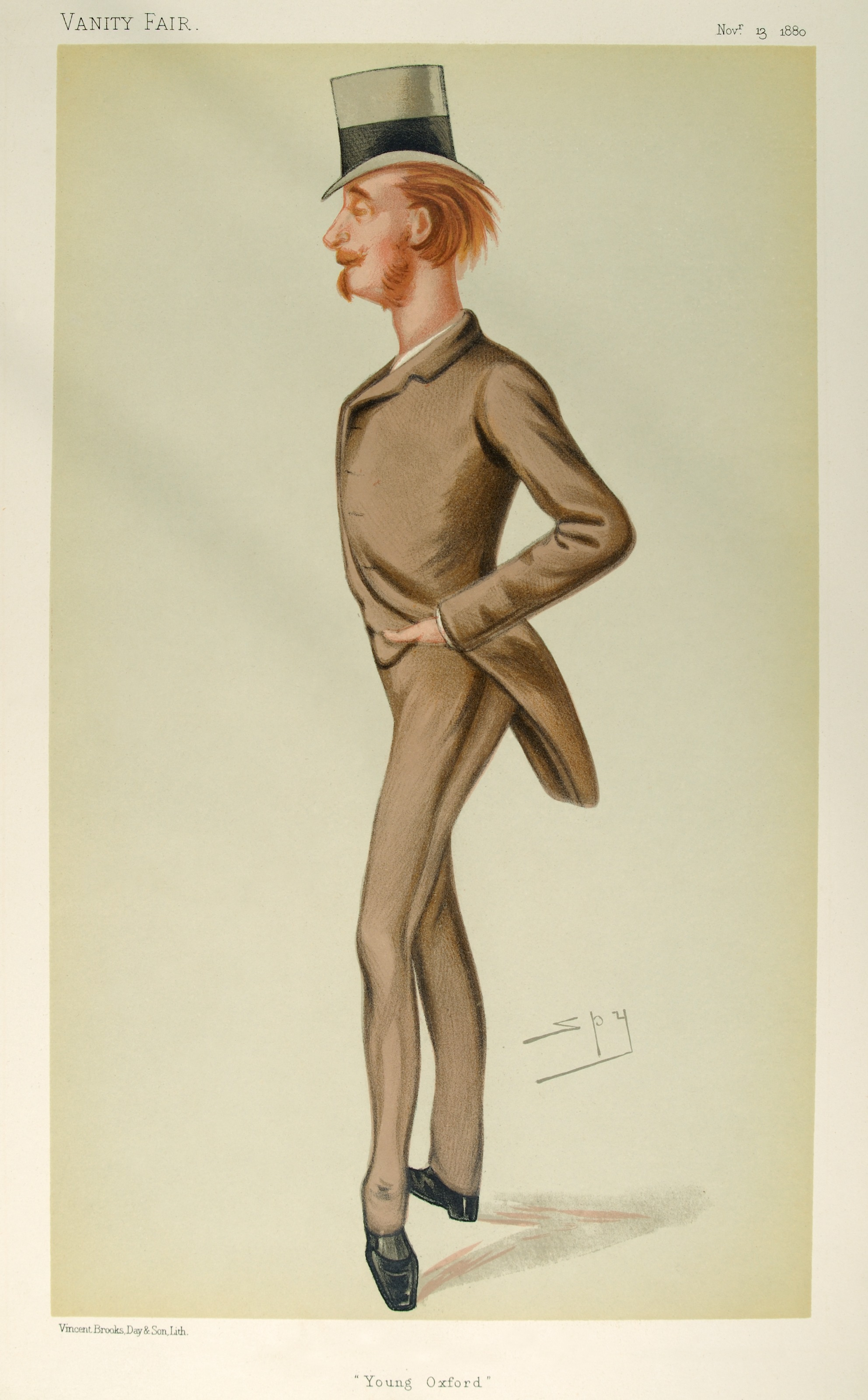
- "Young Oxford", the 6th Earl of Portsmouth when Viscount Lymington, caricature by Spy in Vanity Fair, November 1880.

Under-Secretary of State for War
- In office 12 December 1905 – 12 April 1908
- Monarch: Edward VII
- Prime Minister: Sir Henry Campbell-Bannerman
- Preceded by: The Earl of Donoughmore
- Succeeded by: The Lord Lucas

Personal details
- Born: 19 January 1856 Hurstbourne Priors, Hampshire
- Died: 4 December 1917 (aged 61) Whitchurch, Hampshire
- Party: Liberal; Liberal Unionist
- Spouse(s): Beatrice Mary Pease (d. 1935)
- Education: Balliol College, Oxford

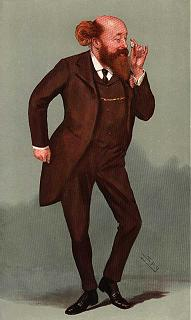
"The Demon", Newton Wallop, 6th Earl of Portsmouth, caricature by Spy, Vanity Fair Magazine 21 August 1907

Newton Wallop, 6th Earl of Portsmouth JP, DL (19 January 1856 – 4 December 1917), styled Viscount Lymington until 1891, was a British Liberal politician but then joined the Liberal Unionist Party in 1886. He later switched back to the Liberal Party to serve as Under-Secretary of State for War under Sir Henry Campbell-Bannerman from 1905 to 1908.

== Background and education ==
Lymington was born in Hurstbourne Priors, Hampshire, the eldest son of Isaac Wallop, 5th Earl of Portsmouth, and his wife Lady Eveline Alicia Juliana Herbert, daughter of Henry Herbert, 3rd Earl of Carnarvon. He was educated at Eton College and from 1876 to 1879 at Balliol College, Oxford, where he was President of the Oxford Union.

== Political career ==
Lymington was elected Member of Parliament (MP) for Barnstaple at a by-election in February 1880, a seat he held until 1885, when representation was reduced to one member under the Redistribution of Seats Act 1885. At the 1885 general election, he was elected MP for South Molton and held the seat until 1891.

In the latter year he succeeded his father in the earldom and took his seat in the House of Lords. From 1905 to 1908, Lord Portsmouth served as Under-Secretary of State for War in the Liberal administration of Sir Henry Campbell-Bannerman.

Lord Portsmouth was also a Justice of the Peace for Hampshire and Devon and a Deputy Lieutenant. A passionate Protestant he chaired the United Protestant Demonstration in London on 29 January 1900 which resolved “to uphold and maintain the Protestantism of the nation and to demand the suppression of the Mass and the Confessional in the Established Church.”

In 1908, he bought Guisachan House and its huge deer estate in Glen Affric from Baron Tweedsmouth. His widow put the estate on the market in 1919 after his death.

== Family ==
Lord Portsmouth married Beatrice Mary Pease, only child of Edward Pease of Darlington, in 1885. He died in December 1917 at Whitchurch, aged 61, and was succeeded in the earldom by his younger brother, John Fellowes Wallop, 7th Earl of Portsmouth. The Countess of Portsmouth died in 1935.

Parliament of the United Kingdom
Preceded by Thomas Cave; Samuel Danks Waddy	Member of Parliament for Barnstaple; 1880 – 1885; With: Thomas Cave 1880; Sir Robert Carden 1880–1885	Succeeded by George Pitt-Lewis (representation reduced to one member 1885)
New constituency	Member of Parliament for South Molton; 1885 – 1891	Succeeded by George Lambert
Political offices
Preceded by The Earl of Donoughmore	Under-Secretary of State for War; 1905–1908	Succeeded by The Lord Lucas
Peerage of Great Britain
Preceded by Isaac Newton Wallop	Earl of Portsmouth; 1891–1917	Succeeded by John Fellowes Wallop
