= John Aston (fl. 1362–1391) =

English politician

John Aston or Eston (fl. 1362–1391) was an English politician.

He was a Member (MP) of the Parliament of England for Leominster in 1362, Dartmouth in 1365, and Barnstaple in 1391.
