= John Bakwell =

English politician

John Bakwell (fl. 1406–1417) was an English politician. He sat as MP for Barnstaple in 1407.
