= John Bidewell =

English politician

John Bidewell (fl. 1336–1398) was an English politician. He sat as MP for Barnstaple in February 1383, 1386, 1394, and 1395.

He also served as mayor of Barnstaple from Michaelmas 1382 till 1383, 1395 till 1397, and 1399 till 1400; and tax collector of Devon in November 1382, December 1385, and 1398.

By 1386, he was married to Margery, the daughter and heiress of Thomas Hunnacott by his wife Agnes, the widow of Nicholas Reygnee of Barnstaple. He then married his second wife, Isabel.
