= Thomas Norris (died 1425) =

English politician

Thomas Norris (died 1424/5), of Chudleigh, Devon, was an English politician.

He was a Member (MP) of the Parliament of England for Barnstaple in February 1388, January 1390, 1394, and 1395, for Totnes in 1391 and for Plympton Erle in 1395 and January 1397.
