= George Pitt-Lewis =

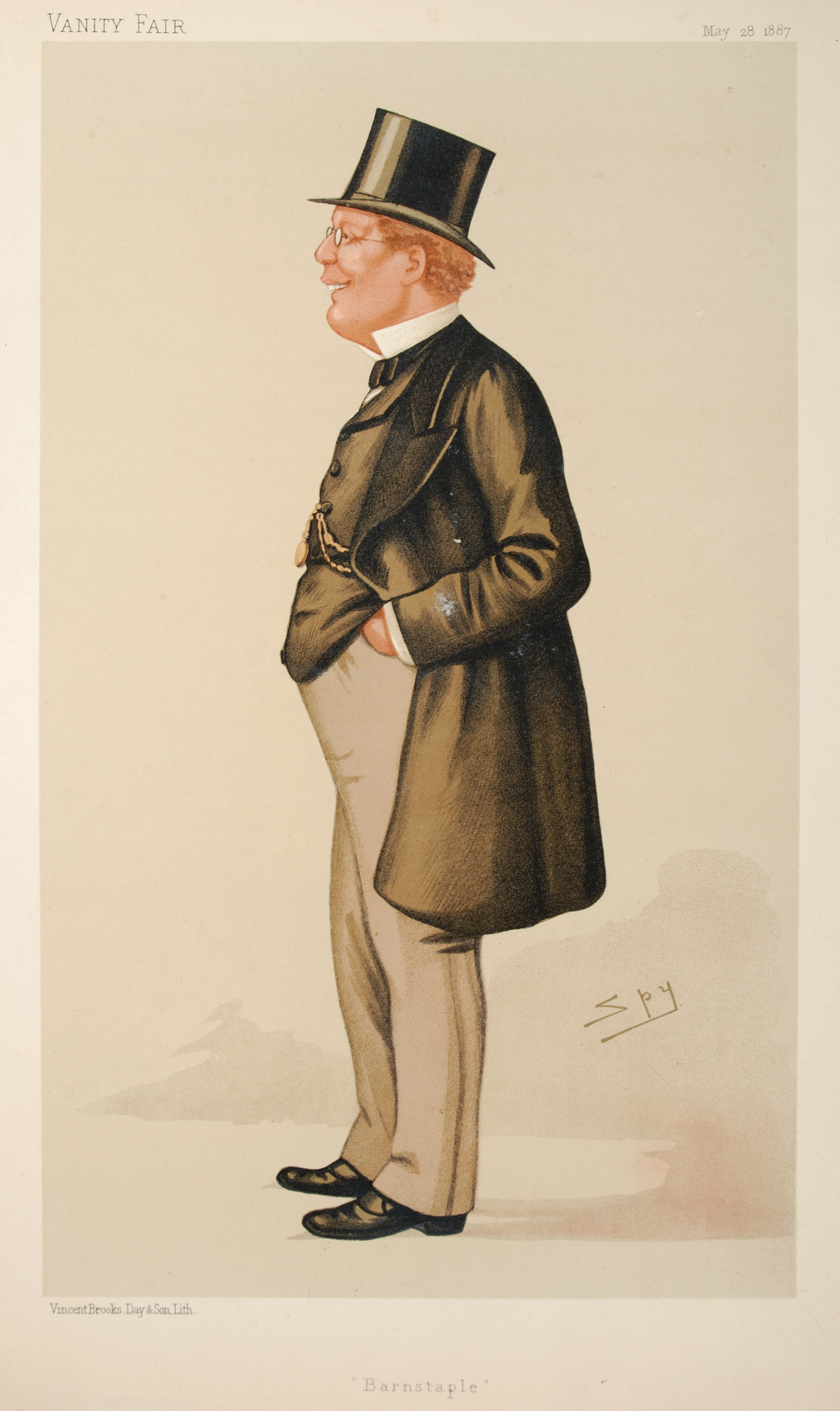
"Barnstaple" Pitt-Lewis as caricatured by Spy (Leslie Ward) in Vanity Fair, May 1887

George Pitt-Lewis, KC (13 December 1845 – 30 December 1906) was an English judge and Liberal and Liberal Unionist politician who sat in the House of Commons from 1885 to 1892.

Pitt-Lewis was born in Honiton, the eldest son of the Rev. George Tucker Lewis and his wife Jane Frances Palmer, daughter of Rev. William Palmer, Rector of Yarcombe, Devon. His father, grandfather and great-grandfather were successively headmasters of Honiton Grammar School, which he himself attended. He was called to the bar at Middle Temple in 1870 after receiving the Certificate of Honour 1st Class and Studentship of Four Inns of Court in 1869. In 1876 he assumed by royal licence the additional surname of Pitt. He went on the Western Circuit and was one of the originators of "The Bar Committee". He became a Queen's Counsel in 1885 and became Recorder of Poole. He was a prodigious author of legal reference works including A Complete County Court Practice.

Pitt-Lewis was elected Member of Parliament for the Barnstaple division of Devon at the 1885 general election, representing initially the Liberal Party, and being re-elected as a Liberal Unionist in 1886 following the split over Home Rule for Ireland. He retired from the House of Commons at the 1892 general election.

Pitt-Lewis married Mai daughter of General John George Palmer, of Paris. His stated recreations included freemasonry and tricycling.

Parliament of the United Kingdom
Preceded by Viscount Lymington; Robert Carden	Member of Parliament for Barnstaple; 1885 – 1892	Succeeded by Alfred Billson
