= Pentecost Dodderidge =

English politician

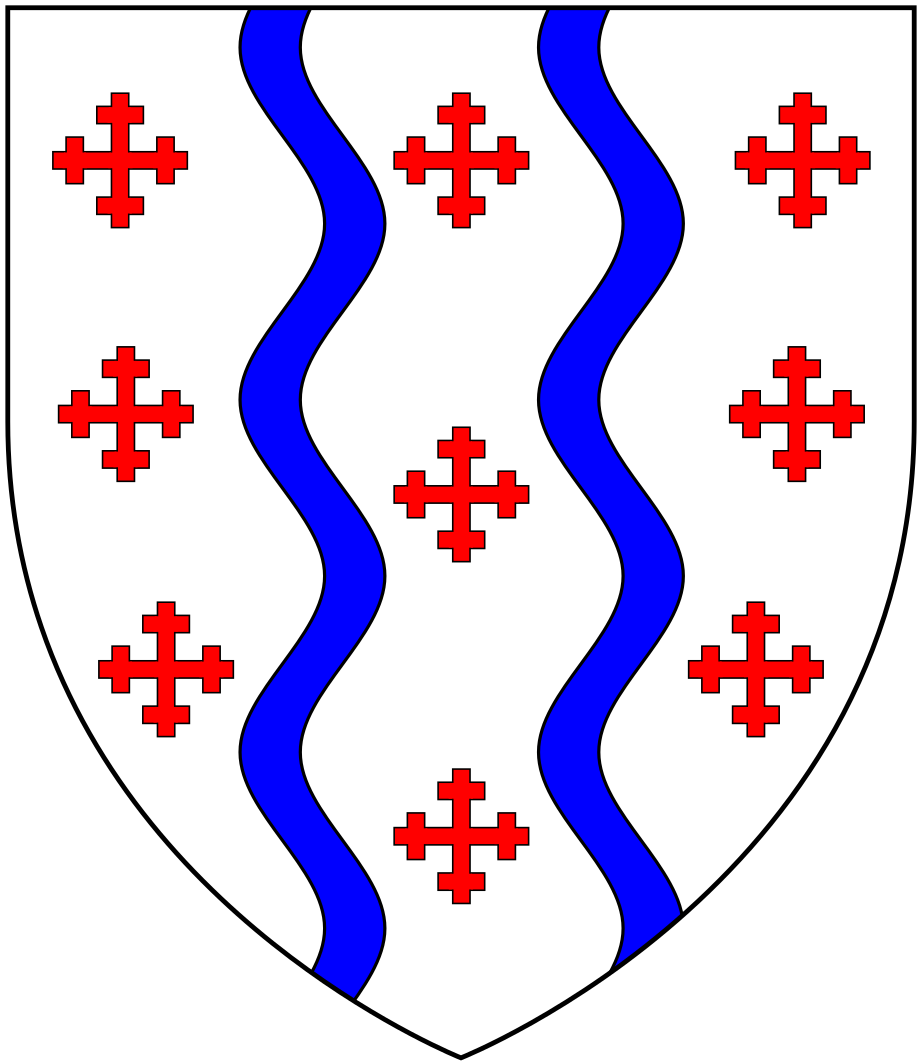
- Arms of Dodderidge: Argent, two pales wavy azure between nine cross croslets gules. These arms are visible on the monument to Sir John Dodderidge (1555–1628), Lady Chapel, Exeter Cathedral

Member of Parliament (Great Britain) for Barnstaple
- In office 1621–1625

Personal details
- Died: c. 1650
- Spouse: Elizabeth Wescombe (m. 1599)
- Children: 3+, including John Dodderidge
- Relatives: John Doddridge (brother)

Pentecost Dodderidge (died c. 1650) of Barnstaple in North Devon, was three times Member of Parliament for Barnstaple in 1621, 1624 and 1625.

== Origins ==
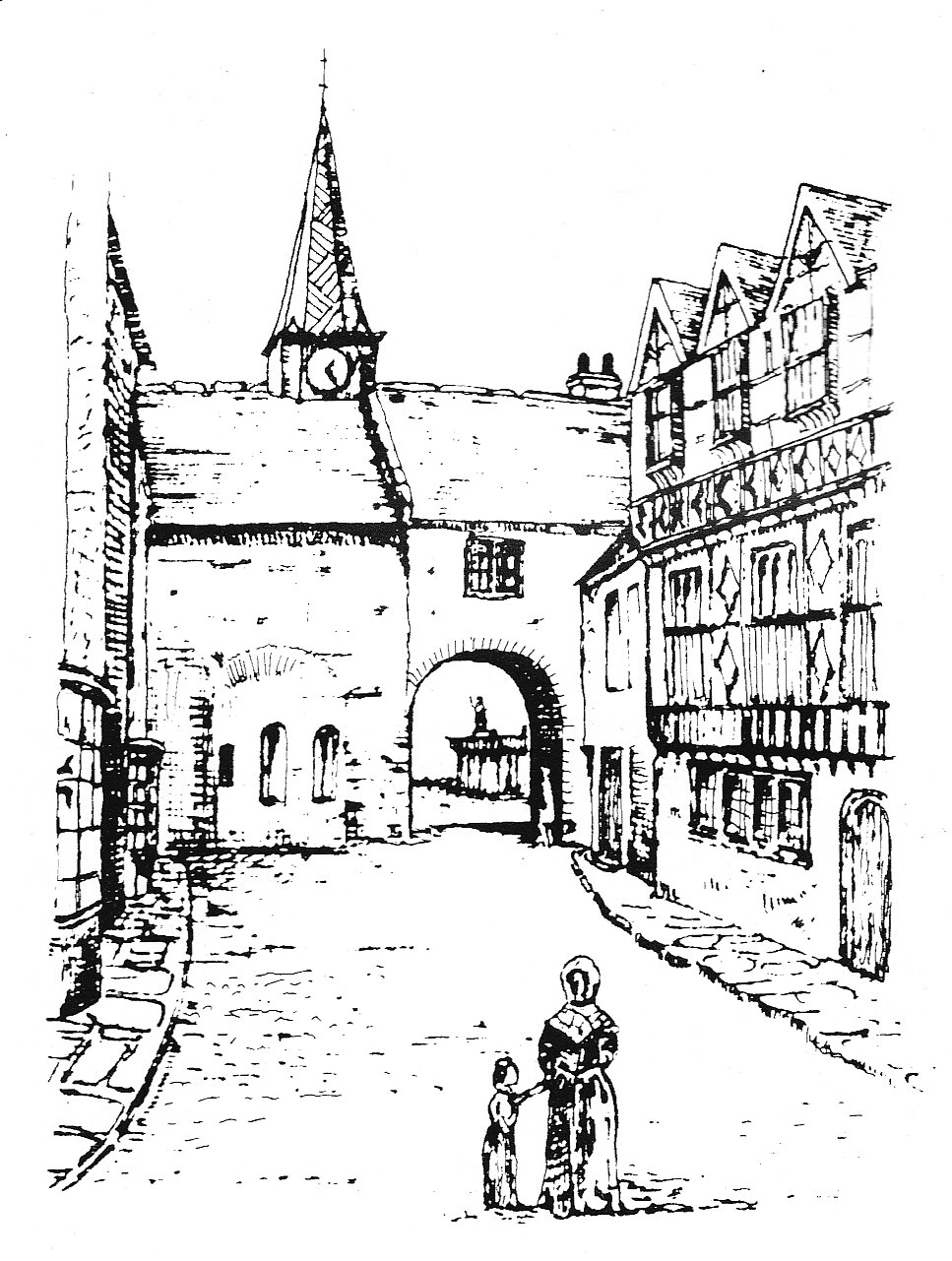
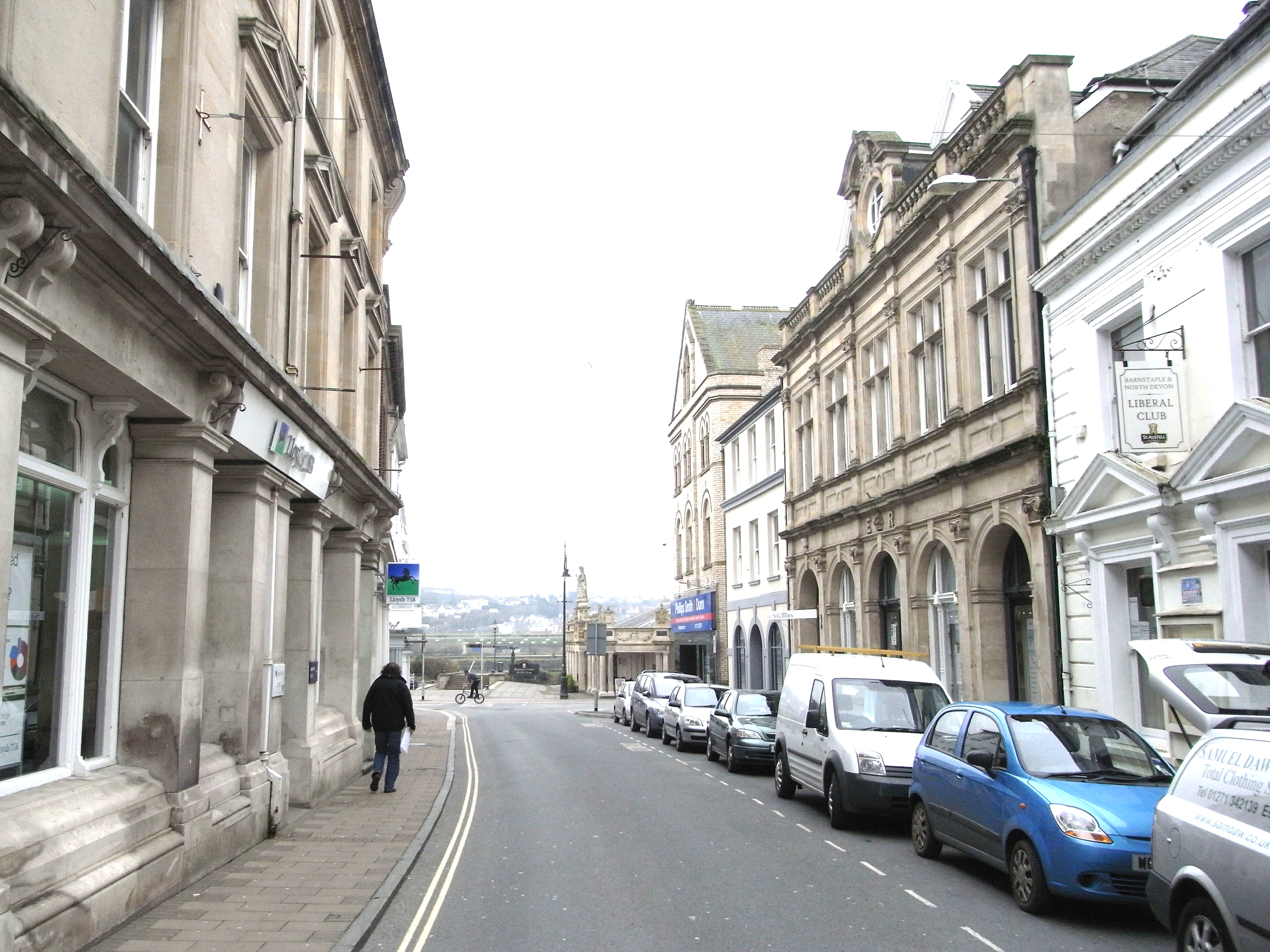
Left: The 16th-century "Dodderidge House" (right), demolished c. 1900, in Cross Street, Barnstaple, Devon, home of Sir John Dodderidge (1555–1628). 19th-century engraving by Jonathan Lomas, view looking down Cross Street from High Cross toward the West Gate (demolished) and to its left the Chapel of St Nicholas. Through the gate is visible the 1708 statue of Queen Anne atop the Mercantile Exchange known today as "Queen Anne's Walk", situated on the old quay of the River Taw where formerly all ships' cargoes were unloaded and sold; right: the same view in 2013

Dodderidge was a son of Richard Doddridge, merchant, of Barnstaple. His elder brother was Sir John Dodderidge (1555–1628), of Bremridge, near South Molton, Devon, Justice of the King's Bench in 1612 and MP for Barnstaple in 1589 and for Horsham in 1604, whose splendid recumbent effigy exists in the Lady Chapel of Exeter Cathedral.

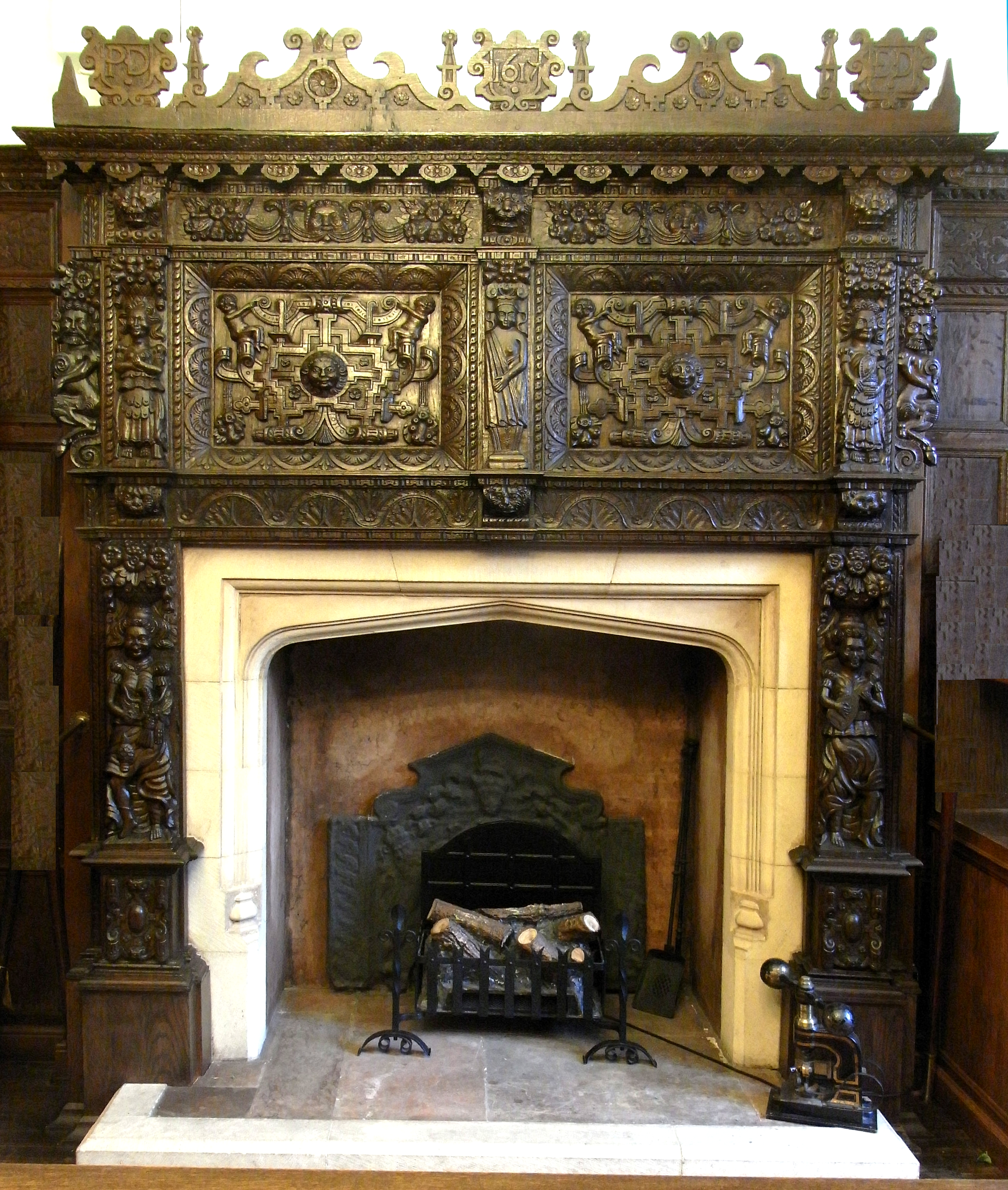
1617 carved oak chimneypiece formerly in the Dodderidge House, Cross Street, Barnstaple, decorated with two strapwork panels inhabited by putti and showing at middle top the date 1617 with to the left the initials "PD" (for Pentecost Dodderidge (d.circa 1650)) and to right "ED" (for Elizabeth Wescombe his wife). Now in the "Dodderidge Room", in the Barnstaple Guildhall with other oak panelling from Dodderidge House.

The Dodderidge family took its name from a manor in the parish of Sandford, near Crediton. Richard Dodderidge was the son of a wool merchant and was born in South Molton, in which town he married. With his wife and eight children before 1582 he moved to Holland Street, Barnstaple and served as Mayor of Barnstaple in 1589. A certain John Dodderidge, perhaps a relation, is recorded earlier in 1579 as mayor of Barnstaple. In 1585 Richard bought a house in Cross Street from his fellow burgess Thomas Skinner, which descended in turn to his sons Sir John and to the latter's brother Pentecost Dodderidge (d. circa 1650. This large timber-framed house, known as the "Dodderidge House" was demolished in about 1900 to make way for a post office, the present large sandstone building with the date "1901" sculpted on its parapet. A room of ornate carved oak panelling dated 1617 from this house survives in Barnstaple Guildhall, known as the "Dodderidge Room" and an ornate overmantel displays the date 1617 between the initials "PD" and "ED", signifying Pentecost and his wife Elizabeth. The room is now used to display the Corporation's silver and the mayor's regalia.

Richard entered the shipping business and owned a 100-ton prize-ship named Prudence, a privateer effectively engaged in licensed piracy. She is recorded as having had 80 men on board in 1590, and landed a record prize taken off the Guinea Coast, probably from Spanish galleons from South America, consisting of four chests of gold worth £16,000 with in addition chains of gold and civet-fur. The gold landed at Barnstaple from this voyage weighed 320 lbs. Between June and October 1590 Prudence sent back to Barnstaple two further prizes of unrecorded value and in January 1592 brought in a prize of £10,000. In March 1596 the Privy Council ordered the mayor of Barnstaple to send a ship to challenge two or three Spanish ships in the Irish Sea and the Prudence was selected for this task. She was victualled for five months, for a crew of 40, at a cost exceeding £900, borne by the North Devon population. On 8 August 1596 she returned to Barnstaple, loaded with much pillage taken during the attack on Cádiz conducted by Lords Essex and Howard. Richard received at some time letters patent as one of six west country merchants licensed to trade with "the River of Senegal and Gambia in Guinea". Richard presented to the Corporation of Barnstaple "a great boale with its covering, wrought in silver and a silver-gilt table lamp".

== Career ==
He was Mayor of Barnstaple in 1611, 1627 and 1637, and in 1621 was elected Member of Parliament for Barnstaple and was re-elected MP for Barnstaple in 1624 and 1625.

== Inheritance ==
In 1628 he inherited the estate of Bremridge, near South Molton, on the death of his brother Sir John Doddridge.

== Marriage and children ==
Dodderidge married Elizabeth Wescombe of Barnstaple on 12 February 1599. Their children included John Dodderidge (died 1659), MP.

== Death ==
Dodderidge died in about 1650.

Parliament of England
Preceded by John Delbridge; John Gostlin	Member of Parliament for Barnstaple; 1621–1625; With: John Delbridge	Succeeded by John Delbridge; Sir Alexander St John
