= Richard Ferris =

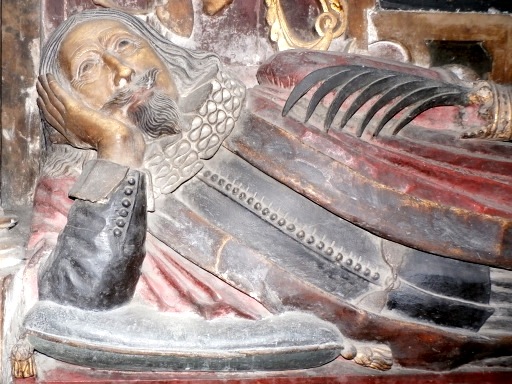
Richard Ferris, detail from his effigy in St Peter's Church, Barnstaple

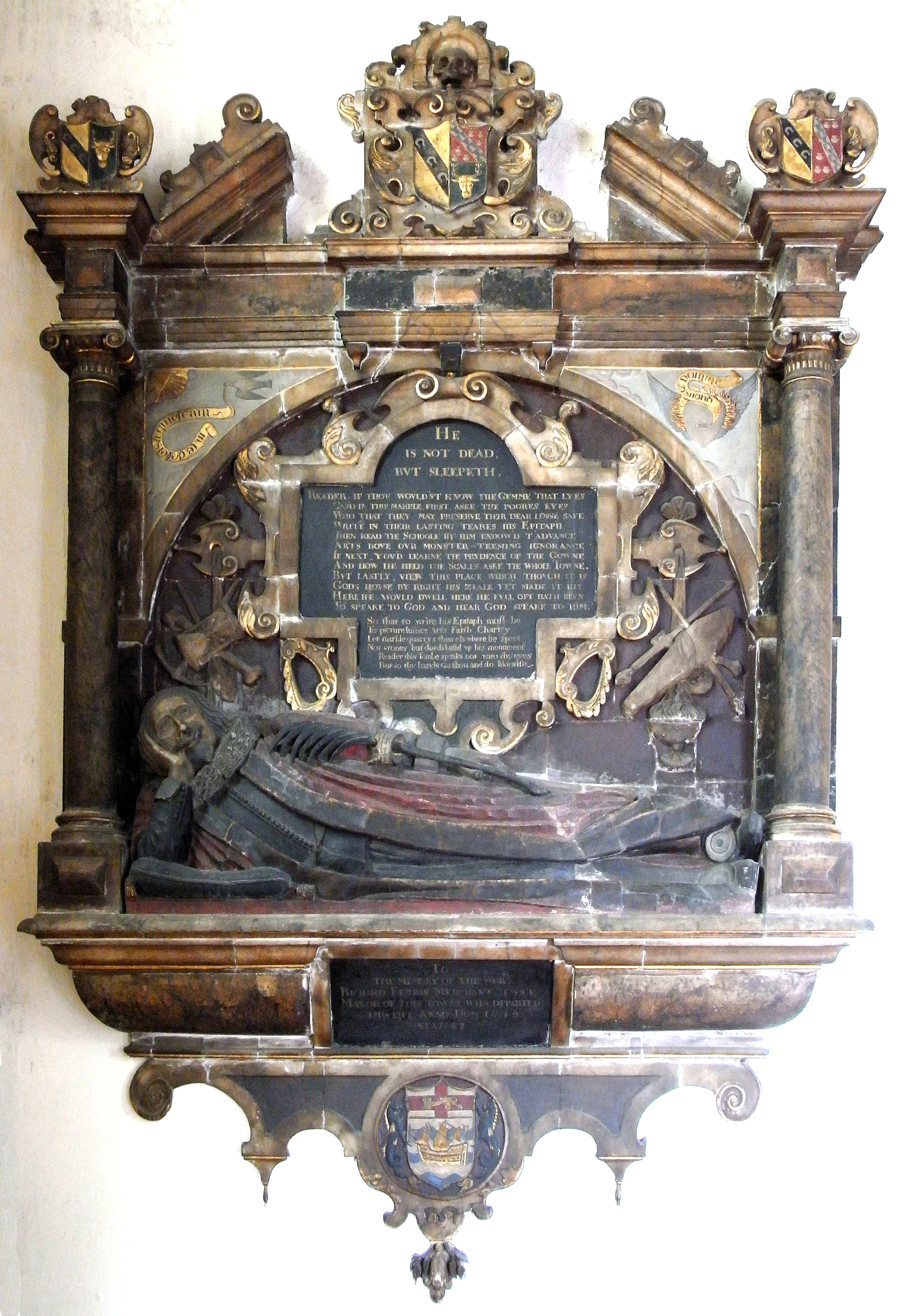
Mural monument to Ferris in St Peter's Church

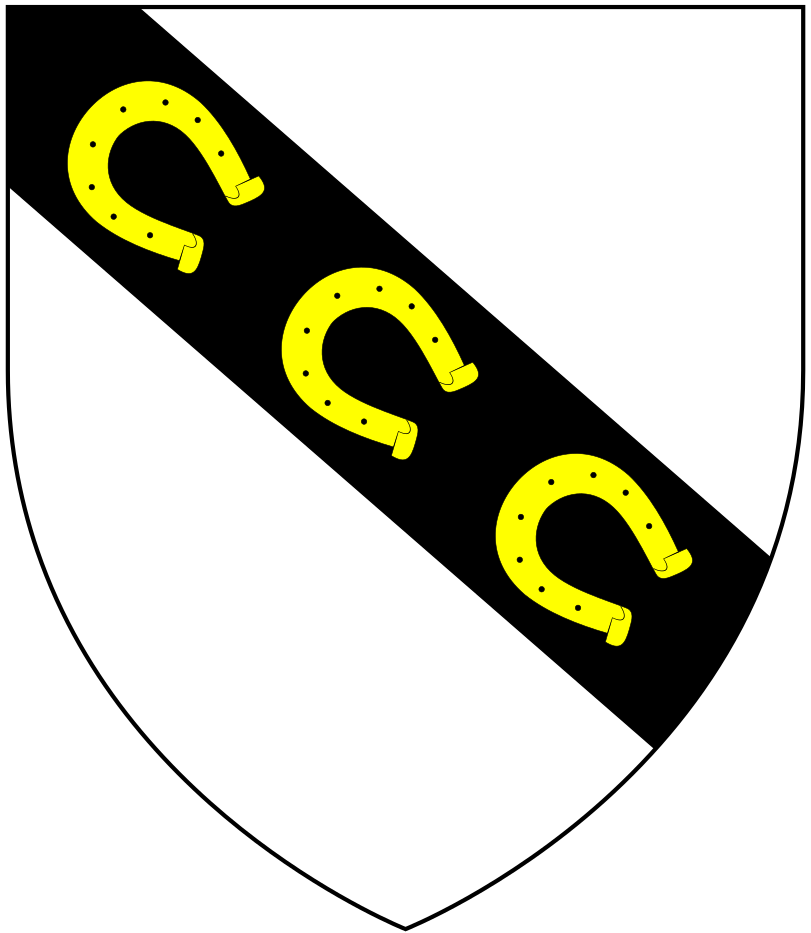
Canting arms of the ancient Anglo-Norman family of Ferrers of Bere Ferrers, Churston Ferrers, Fenyton, etc. all in Devon: Argent, on a bend sable three horse-shoes or. The arms of Richard Ferris as shown on his monument have the tinctures transposed as: Or, on a bend sable three horse-shoes argent

Richard Ferris (died 1649, aged 67) was a wealthy merchant from Barnstaple in Devon, England who served as a Member of Parliament for Barnstaple in 1640 and served twice as Mayor of Barnstaple in 1632 and 1646. He founded the Barnstaple Grammar School, otherwise known as the "Blue School".

== Origins ==
Ferris was born at Barnstaple, the son of Philip Ferris by his wife Thomasyn Cade. The armorials displayed on his monument in St Peter's Church, Barnstaple (Or, on a bend sable three horse-shoes argent) are the canting arms of the ancient Ferrers family seated from the 12th century at Bere Ferrers in Devon, where they had their castle, which also held the manors of Churston Ferrers and Newton Ferrers with many others in Devon. The Devonshire historian Pole (d.1635), stated: Beere Ferrers, which takes his name of ye famyly of Ferrers, th'ancient inhabitants, from whence all the Ferrers in Devon & Cornwall issued, and states that Raph de Ferrarys was lord of Beere in King Henry 2 tyme (i.e. Henry II (1154–1189)). However the senior male line of this family is known to have died out on the death of Martin Ferrers (living during the reign of King Edward III (1327–1377)), who left three daughters and co-heiresses, who married into the families of Champernowne, Poynings and Fleming. The name Ferrers was Latinized as de Ferariis, from the Latin noun ferrarius (from ferrum, "iron"), meaning an iron-worker or blacksmith, alluded to by the horse-shoes in the canting arms.

The Cade family seated at Fremington were prominent merchants at nearby Barnstaple. Roger Cade (d.1618) of Barnstaple was Mayor of Barnstaple in 1591.

== Career ==
The records of the Borough of Barnstaple record in 1630 that a payment was made by the Borough to Alexander Horwood (Mayor of Barnstaple in 1634) and Richard Ferris "for riding to Exon (i.e. Exeter, Devon) about the Spanish Company". Barnstaple is particularly associated with this company, and the company's arms are shown on several monuments in St Peter's Church and also sculpted in relief on the plaster ceiling of the grand townhouse at 62 Boutport Street, Barnstaple.

In November 1640 Ferris was elected as one of the two Members of Parliament for Barnstaple in the Long Parliament. During the Civil war he was a "fervent Parliamentarian" and when the town of Barnstaple was "without stocke of money" he was one of those (including George Peard, Richard Beaple and Pentecost Dodderidge), who made personal financial contributions. He served twice as Mayor of Barnstaple in 1632 (before the Civil War) and for another year from September 1646, immediately after the Civil War, Sir Allen Apsley having surrendered the town to Parliamentarian forces on 14 April 1646. His second election was conducted in open air, to reduce the risk of catching the plague then ravaging the town, as is recorded in the Journal of Rev. Richard Wood, Vicar of Fremington: "Mr Ferris was elected Mayor in the marsh on the higher side of Kony Bridge by ballets". Ferris founded the grammar school at Barnstaple.

== Death, burial and monument ==
He died in 1649 aged 67 and was buried in St Peter's Church in Barnstaple. His large mural monument with recumbent effigy survives in that church.

Parliament of England
Parliament suspended since 1629	Member of Parliament for Barnstaple; 1640; With: George Peard	Succeeded by Philip Skippon; John Dodderidge
