= Thomas Raymond (MP) =

English politician

Thomas Raymond (died 1418), of Simpson in Holsworthy, Devon, was an English politician.

== Family ==
He was the father of Richard Raymond.

== Career ==
He was a Member (MP) of the Parliament of England for Barnstaple in 1372, January 1377 and October 1377, for Dartmouth in October 1377, for Plympton Erle in 1381, for Exeter in May 1382, February 1388 and January 1404, and for Tavistock in October 1377 and November 1384.
