= Richard Raymond (MP) =

English politician

Richard Raymond (died 1417/1418), of Devon, was an English politician.

== Family ==
Raymond was the son of the MP, Thomas Raymond.

== Career ==
He was a member (MP) of the parliament of England for Exeter in 1410.
