= Richard Skinner (MP) =

16th-century English politician

Richard Skinner (by 1506 – buried on 12 August 1575) was an English politician.

He was a member (MP) of the parliament of England for Barnstaple in 1558. He was once a mayor and when running for Barnstaple he won over William Salusbury.
