= Robert Carden =

Lord Mayor of London

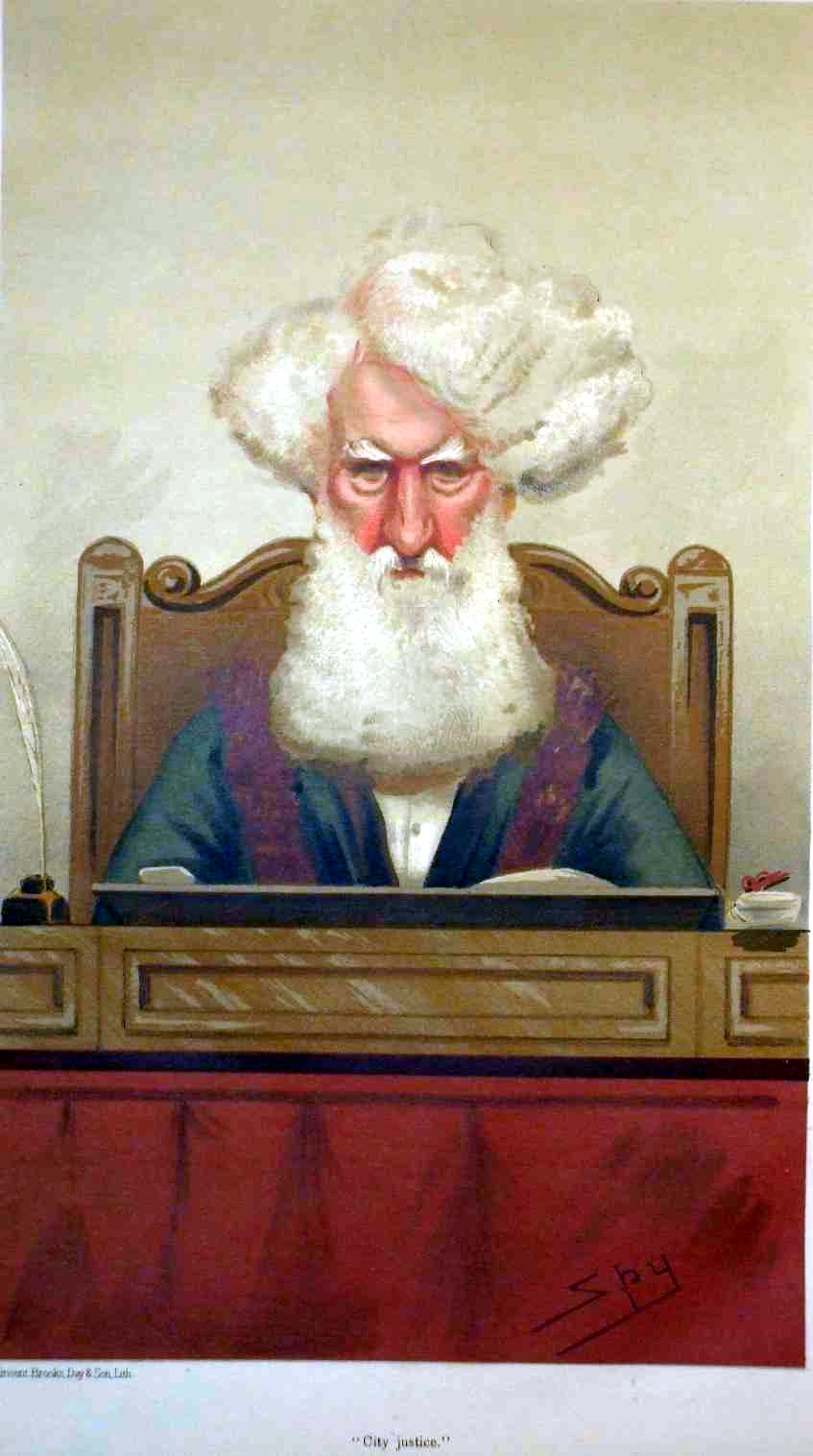
"City justice" Carden as caricatured by Spy (Leslie Ward) in Vanity Fair, December 1880

Sir Robert Walter Carden, 1st Baronet (7 October 1801 – 19 January 1888) was a British banker and Conservative politician.

Carden was the son of James Carden and his wife Mary (née Walter), who was a daughter of John Walter, founder of The Times newspaper. In 1816, he took a commission in the 52nd (Oxfordshire) Regiment of Foot.

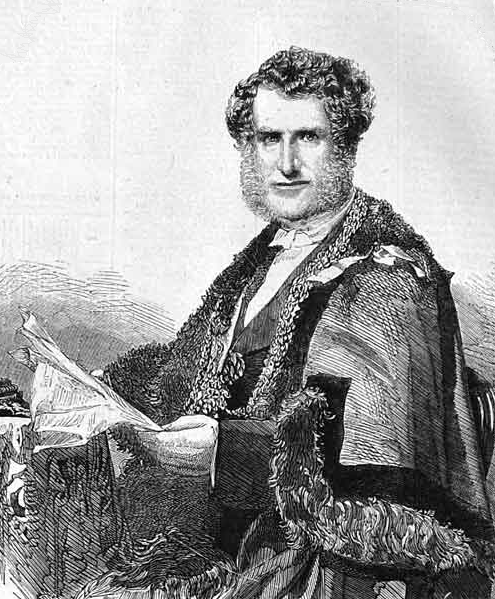
Sir Robert Walter Carden in 1857

Later a successful banker, he was knighted in 1851. He was Sheriff of London in 1850 and was elected Lord Mayor of London in 1857. He was elected to the House of Commons as one of two representatives for Gloucester in 1857, a seat he held until 1859. Carden was out of parliament for more than twenty years, but returned in 1880 when he was elected member of parliament for Barnstaple, which he remained until 1885. Apart from his business and political career he was also a justice of the peace for Surrey and Middlesex. In June 1887, aged 85, he was created a baronet, of Molesey in the County of Surrey.

Carden married Pamela Elizabeth Edith, daughter of William Smith Andrews, in 1827. They had three sons and seven daughters. She died in 1874. Carden survived her by 14 years and died in January 1888, aged 86. He is buried alongside his wife and two of his children at Kensal Green Cemetery. He was succeeded in the baronetcy by his eldest son Frederick.

Parliament of the United Kingdom
Preceded by Maurice Berkeley; William Philip Price	Member of Parliament for Gloucester; 1857 – 1859; With: William Philip Price	Succeeded by William Philip Price; Charles James Monk
Preceded by Thomas Cave; Viscount Lymington	Member of Parliament for Barnstaple; 2-seat constituency until 1885; 1880 – 1885; With: Viscount Lymington	Succeeded by George Pitt-Lewis
Baronetage of the United Kingdom
New creation	Baronet (of Molesey); 1887–1888	Succeeded by Frederick Walter Carden
