= Henry Alexander (1787–1861) =

English politician)

Henry Alexander (1787–1861) was an English Tory politician who represented Barnstaple from 1826 to 1830.
