= George Peard (1548–1621) =

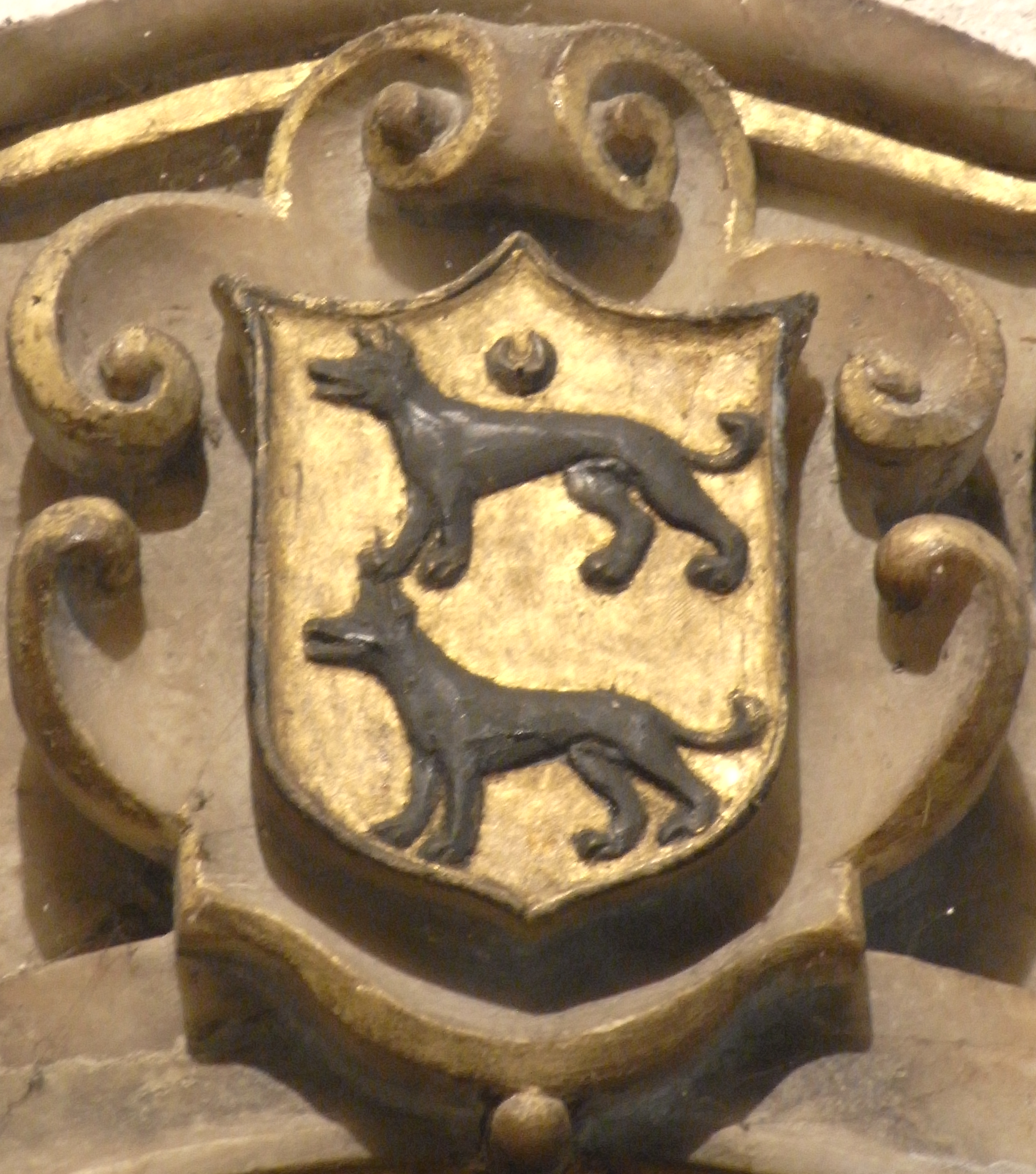
Arms of Peard (Note: As shown on a 17th century monument of a member of the Peard family in St Peter's Church, Barnstaple. Blazon: Or, two wolves passant in pale sable langued gules, here shown with A crescent sable for difference.)

George Peard (1548–1621) of the High Street, Barnstaple in north Devon, England was a lawyer of that town and was twice elected as one of the two Members of Parliament for Barnstaple, in 1597 and 1604.

His nephew George Peard (1594–1645) was also elected as a Member of Parliament for Barnstaple in 1640, in both the Short and Long Parliaments.

== Origins ==
He was the second but eldest surviving son and heir of John Peard (died 1574) of Barnstaple, Chamberlain of the Borough of Barnstaple, by his wife Juliana Berry (whom he married on 4 May 1545) who was a daughter of Nicholas Berry of Eastleigh, Devon. (Note: Or of 'Berry Narbor', per Vivian, p.74 (Pedigree of Berry of Berrynarbor))

== Career ==
He was ordained as a priest at some time before 1572, in which year he was appointed as Rector of Rampisham in Dorset, the patron of that advowson being Sir John Stawell of Somerset. However he soon abandoned his career as a cleric and in 1573 entered Lincoln's Inn to study law.

In 1597 he was elected to represent Barnstaple in Parliament, benefiting from the rejection by the patron of the borough (the 4th earl of Bath), of the candidate put forward by the corporation. He was returned for a second time in the 'Blessed Parliament' of 1604, but made little impression until the fourth session in 1610 when he made four speeches. His main interests were in affairs relevant to his home area, speaking for instance in favour of a bill to improve the quality of Devon's agricultural land by the use of sea sand.

Although Peard received little remuneration from his work as an MP, he evidently had good earnings as a lawyer. At his death he owned over 300 acres of land in Devon and had several valuable personal possessions. In his will his main heir was his younger brother, John, though he left his wife a life interest in his Barnstaple properties. He also made provision for the poor of the town and left "a ‘fair silver gilt bowl’ for the use of Barnstaple’s mayors in perpetuity."

== Personal life ==
On 24 September 1576 he married Agnes Jewell (died 1621), a daughter of John Jewell of East Down. By her he had one son who died before his father. On his death, childless, on 31 January 1621, his heir became his younger brother John Peard (Mayor of Barnstaple in 1606). He requested to be buried in St Peter's Church in Barnstaple, near the grave of his only son. Two mural monuments to the Peard family survive in St Peter's Church, Barnstaple.
