= Frederick Hodgson (politician) =

English politician (1795–1854)

Frederick Hodgson (1795–1854) was an English politician who represented Barnstaple from 1824 to 1830; 1831 to 1832; and 1837 to 1847.
