= List of battalions of the Devonshire Regiment =

This is a list of battalions of the Devonshire Regiment, which existed as an infantry regiment of the British Army from 1881 to 1958.

== Original composition ==
When the 11th (North Devonshire) Regiment of Foot became the Devonshire Regiment in 1881 under the Cardwell-Childers reforms of the British Armed Forces, seven pre-existent militia and volunteer battalions of Devonshire were integrated into the structure of the regiment. Volunteer battalions had been created in reaction to a perceived threat of invasion by France in the late 1850s. Organised as "rifle volunteer corps", they were independent of the British Army and composed primarily of the middle class.

Battalion	Formed	Formerly
Regular
1st	1685	1st Battalion, 11th (North Devonshire) Regiment of Foot
2nd	1858	2nd Battalion, 11th (North Devonshire) Regiment of Foot
Militia
3rd (2nd Devon Militia)	1853	South Devon Militia
4th (1st Devon Militia)	1853	East Devon Militia
Volunteers
1st (Exeter and South Devon) Volunteer	1853	1st Devonshire (Exeter and South Devon) Rifle Volunteer Corps
2nd (Prince of Wales's) Volunteer	1860	2nd Devonshire Rifle Volunteer Corps (Prince of Wales's)
3rd Volunteer	1860	3rd Devonshire Rifle Volunteer Corps
4th Volunteer	1860	4th Devonshire Rifle Volunteer Corps
5th (The Hay Tor) Volunteer	1860	5th Devonshire Rifle Volunteer Corps

== Reorganisation ==
The Territorial Force (later Territorial Army) was formed in 1908, which the volunteer battalions joined, while the militia battalions transferred to the "Special Reserve". All volunteer battalions were renumbered to create a single sequential order. Also in 1908, the 3rd (Militia) Battalion was one of the 23 infantry militia battalions to disband, and so the 4th was renumbered at the 3rd.

Battalion	Formerly
4th	1st (Exeter and South Devon) Volunteer Battalion
5th (Prince of Wales's)	Amalgamation of 2nd (Prince of Wales's) and 5th (The Hay Tor) Volunteer Battalions
6th	4th Volunteer
7th (Cyclist)	Cyclist sections of 1st (Exeter and South Devon), 2nd (Prince of Wales's), and 5th (The Hay Tor) Volunteer Battalions

== First World War ==
The Devons fielded 28 battalions and lost over 6,000 officers and other ranks during the course of the war. The regiment's territorial components formed duplicate second and third line battalions. As an example, the three-line battalions of the 4th Devons were numbered as the 1/4th, 2/4th, and 3/4th respectively, with the third line battalions, being redesignated reserve battalions in 1916. Four battalions of the regiment were formed as part of Secretary of State for War Lord Kitchener's appeal for an initial 100,000 men volunteers in 1914. They were referred to as the New Army or Kitchener's Army. The Volunteer Training Corps were raised with overage or reserved occupation men early in the war, and were initially self-organised into many small corps, with a wide variety of names, such as the Bideford and District Emergence League formed in early August 1914 with 80 members. Recognition of the corps by the authorities brought regulation and as the war continued the small corps were formed into battalion sized units of the county Volunteer Regiment. In 1918 these were linked to county regiments.

Battalion	Formed	Served	Fate
Regular
1st	1685	Western Front, Italian Front	
2nd	1858	Western Front	
Special Reserve
3rd (Reserve)	1908	Britain	
Territorial Force
1/4th	1853	Mesopotamia	
1/5th (Prince of Wales's)	1908	India, Sinai and Palestine, Western Front	
1/6th	1860	India, Mesopotamia	
1/7th (Cyclist)	1908	Britain	See Inter-War
2/4th	Exeter, September 1914	India, Sinai and Palestine	Disbanded, in Egypt, August 1918
2/5th (Prince of Wales's)	Plymouth, September 1914	Egypt	Disbanded, in Egypt, June 1916
2/6th	Barnstaple, September 1914	India, Mesopotamia	Disbanded, in 1919
2/7th (Cyclist)	Totnes, October 1914	Britain	Disbanded, in 1919
3/4th 4th (Reserve), from April 1916	Exeter, March 1915	Britain, Ireland	Disbanded, in 1919
3/5th (Prince of Wales's); 5th (Reserve), from April 1916	Plymouth, March 1915	Britain	Absorbed by 4th (Reserve) Battalion, in September 1916
3/6th 6th (Reserve), from April 1916	Barnstaple, March 1915	Britain	Absorbed by 4th (Reserve) Battalion, in September 1916
3/7th (Cyclist)	1915	Britain	Disbanded, in March 1916
15th	January 1917 from 86th Provisional Battalion (Territorial Force)	Britain	Disbanded, in 1919
16th (Royal 1st Devon and Royal North Devon Yeomanry)	Egypt, January 1917	Sinai and Palestine, Western Front	Disbanded, in 1919
New Army
8th (Service)	Exeter, August 1914	Western Front, Italian Front	Disbanded, in 1919
9th (Service)	Exeter, September 1914	Western Front, Italian Front	Disbanded, in 1919
10th (Service)	Exeter, September 1914	Western Front, Salonika	Disbanded, in 1919
11th (Reserve)	Exeter, November 1914	Britain	Converted to 44th Training Reserve Battalion in September 1916
Others
12th (Labour)	Devonport, May 1916	Western Front	Became Nos. 152 and 153 Companies, Labour Corps, in April 1917
13th (Works)	Saltash, June 1916	Britain	Became 3rd Labour Battalion, in April 1917
14th (Labour)	Plymouth, August 1916	Western Front	Became Nos. 154 and 155 Companies, Labour Corps, in April 1917
1st Garrison	Weymouth, August 1915	Egypt, Sinai and Palestine	Disbanded, in 1919
2nd (Home Service) Garrison	Exeter, July 1916	Britain	Converted to 5th Battalion, Royal Defence Corps, in August 1917
51st (Graduated)	October 1917 from 206th (Infantry) Battalion, Training Reserve	Britain	Converted to service battalion and disbanded in 1920
52nd (Graduated)	October 1917 from 210th (Infantry) Battalion, Training Reserve	Britain	Converted to service battalion and disbanded in Germany, in 1920
53rd (Young Soldier)	October 1917 from 35th Training Reserve Battalion	Britain	Converted to service battalion and absorbed into 1/5th Battalion in Germany, in 1920
Volunteer Training Corps
1st Battalion Devonshire Volunteer Regiment later the 1st Volunteer Battalion, Devonshire Regiment		Exeter	Disbanded post war
2nd Battalion Devonshire Volunteer Regiment later the 2nd Volunteer Battalion, Devonshire Regiment		Plymouth	Disbanded post war
3rd Battalion (North Devon) Devonshire Volunteer Regiment		Chester	Disbanded 1918
4th Battalion (South Devon) Devonshire Volunteer Regiment later the 3rd Volunteer Battalion, Devonshire Regiment		Torquay	Disbanded post war
5th Battalion (East Devon) Devonshire Volunteer Regiment		Sidmouth	Disbanded 1918

== Inter-War ==
By 1920, all of the regiment's war-raised battalions had disbanded. The Special Reserve reverted to its militia designation in 1921, then to the Supplementary Reserve in 1924; however, its battalions were effectively placed in 'suspended animation'. As World War II approached, the Territorial Army was reorganised in the mid-1930s, many of its infantry battalions were converted to other roles, especially anti-aircraft.

Battalion	Fate
5th (Prince of Wales's)	
7th (Cyclist)	Originally to convert to 7th (Devon and Warwick) Medium Brigade, Royal Garrison Artillery; however instead disbanded in 1921.

== Second World War ==
The regiment's expansion during the Second World War was modest compared to 1914–1918. National Defence Companies were combined to create a new "Home Defence" battalion, and in addition to this 25 battalions of the Home Guard were affiliated to the regiment, wearing its cap badge. By 1944 two anti-aircraft rocket batteries (Z Battery) were also part of the regiment. Due to the daytime (or shift working) occupations of these men, the batteries required eight times the manpower of an equivalent regular battery. A number of Light Anti-Aircraft (LAA) troops were formed from the local battalions to defend specific points, such as factories. .

Battalion	Formed	Served	Fate
Regular
1st	1685	India, Burma	
2nd	1858	Malta, Sicily, North West Europe	See Post-World War II
Supplementary Reserve
3rd	1908		See Post-World War II
Territorial Army
4th	1853	Gibraltar, Britain	
5th (Prince of Wales's)	1908	Britain	Converted to 86th Anti-Tank Regiment, Royal Artillery, in 1941
6th	1860	Britain, Ireland	Converted to 628th Heavy Regiment, Royal Artillery, in January 1947
7th (Haytor)	1939 as a duplicate of 5th (Prince of Wales's) Battalion	Britain	Converted to 87th Anti-Tank Regiment, Royal Artillery, in 1941
8th	1939 as a duplicate of 4th Battalion	Britain	Disbanded, in 1947
9th	1939 as a duplicate of 6th Battalion	Britain	Disbanded, in August 1942
10th	November 1939 from No. 80 Group, National Defence Companies	Britain	Become 30th Battalion, in December 1941
11th	July 1940 from Regimental Depot	Britain, Ireland	Disbanded, in September 1943
12th	July 1940 from 50th (Holding) Battalion	Normandy, North West Europe	Disbanded, in November 1945
30th	December 1941 from 10th Battalion	Britain	Disbanded, in 1945
50th (Holding)	1940	Britain	Became 12th Battalion, in 1940

Home Guard
Battalion	Headquarters	Formation Sign (dark blue on khaki)	Battalion	Headquarters	Formation Sign (dark blue on khaki)
1st	Exeter	DVN 1	2nd	Ottery St. Mary	DVN 2
3rd	Cullompton	DVN 3	4th	Barnstaple	DVN 4
5th	Bideford	DVN 5	6th	Chumleigh	DVN 6
7th	Oakhampton	DVN 7	8th	Holsworthy	DVN 8
9th	Newton Abbot	DVN 9	10th	Torquey	DVN 10
11th	Knightsbridge	DVN 11	13th	Totnes	DVN 13
14th	Bovey Tracy	DVN 14	15th	Plympton	DVN 15
16th	Plymouth	DVN 16	17th	Devonport	DVN 17
18th	Saltash	DVN 18	19th	Seaton	DVN 19
20th	Tiverton	DVN 20	21st	Plymouth	DVN 21
22nd	Exeter (5th Bn Southern Railways)	DVN 22	23rd (Drake's)	Tavistock	DVN 23
24th	Hartland	DVN 24	25th	Illfracombe	DVN 25
Home Guard Anti-Aircraft units
Formation Sign (dark blue on khaki)	Headquarters or Location	AA Formation and Designation	Formation Sign (dark blue on khaki)	Headquarters or Location	AA Formation and Designation
DVN 101	Plymstock	144th Battery, 18th Anti-Aircraft Regiment (Home Guard) (Z battery)	DVN 102	Plymouth	142nd Battery, 18th Anti-Aircraft Regiment (Home Guard) (Z battery)
DVN 1	Exeter, (Great Western Railways)	A Troop LAA	DVN 9	Newton Abbot, (Great Western Railways)	A Troop LAA
DVN 10	Torre, (Great Western Railways)	A Troop LAA	DVN 16	Plymouth and Laira Junction, (Great Western Railways)	A Troop LAA
DVN 17	Plymouth, (Dockyards)	A Troop LAA	DVN 17	Ernesettle and Bull Point; Ammunition depots	B Troop LAA
DVN 22	Barnstaple, (Southern Railways)	A Troop LAA	DVN 22	Exeter and Exmouth, (Southern Railways)	B Troop LAA
DVN 22	Exeter Junction and Axminster, (Southern Railways)	C Troop LAA	DVN 22	Templecombe and Yeovil Junction, (Southern Railways)	D Troop LAA
DVN 22	Oakhampton, Meldon Quarry, Tavistock and Bere Aslton, (Southern Railways)	E Troop LAA	DVN 22	Launceston and Wadebridge, (Southern Railways)	F Troop LAA

== Post-World War II ==
In the immediate post-war period, the army was significantly reduced: nearly all infantry regiments had their first and second battalions amalgamated and the Supplementary Reserve disbanded.

Battalion	Fate
2nd	Disbanded, in June 1948
5th (Prince of Wales's)	Reformed, in January 1947. Later amalgamated with the 4th Battalion, in May 1950.

== 1957 Defence White Paper ==
Under the 1957 Defence White Paper, it was announced that the Devonshire Regiment would amalgamate with the Dorset Regiment, to form the Devonshire and Dorset Regiment, in May 1958.

Battalion	Fate
1st	Amalgamated with 1st Battalion, Dorset Regiment to form 1st Battalion, Devonshire and Dorset Regiment
4th	Transferred to the Devonshire and Dorset Regiment without a change in title
