= Devon Militia =

Part-time military force in the maritime county of Devonshire

The Devon Militia was a part-time military force in the maritime county of Devonshire in the West of England. From their formal organisation as Trained Bands in 1558 until their final service as a Special Reserve unit of the Devonshire Regiment in World War I, the Militia regiments of Devonshire served in home defence in all of Britain's major wars.

== Devon Trained Bands ==
The universal obligation to military service in the Shire levy or Posse comitatus was long established in England and its legal basis was updated by two acts of 1557 covering musters (4 & 5 Ph. & M. c. 3) and the maintenance of horses and armour (4 & 5 Ph. & M. c. 2). The county militia was now placed under the Lord Lieutenant, assisted by the Deputy Lieutenants and Justices of the Peace. The entry into force of these Acts in 1558 is seen as the starting date for the organised county militia in England. Although the militia obligation was universal, it was clearly impractical to train and equip every able-bodied man, so after 1572 the practice was to select a proportion of men for the Trained Bands, who were mustered for regular training. The men from the Hundreds of Devonshire were organised in four groups for the defence of the harbours on the north and south coasts of the county, each with a nominated officer in command, supported by 'Assistants' and 'Petty Captains'. By 1577 the Devon Trained Bands were divided into three 'Divisions' (East, North and South), each with two Colonels and a number of Captains. Later in the reign of Elizabeth I the threat of Spanish invasion led to emphasis being placed on the 17 'maritime' counties most vulnerable to invasion, and in 1584 the Devonshire Trained Bands fielded more men than any other county: assessed at 1200 'shot' (men with firearms), 800 bowmen, and 1000 'corslets' (armoured men), the county actually provided more than was required in each category, a total of 3178 men. In the Armada year of 1588 the three Devonshire Divisions (each of two or three large companies, totalling 3661 men) were instructed to join the army forming to defend the South Coast of England, while 1650 able-bodied untrained men remained to defend the county. By 1633 the seven companies were each regarded as a regiment and, together with the companies in the main towns, amounted to almost 6750 trained men, one-third armed with pikes and two-thirds with muskets.

Although control of the militia was one of the areas of dispute between King Charles I and Parliament that led to the First English Civil War, most of the county Trained Bands played little part in the fighting. An attempt by the Royalists to call out the posse comitatus of Devonshire in 1642 was a failure (compared with their success in raising the Trained Bands in neighbouring Cornwall) and it was quickly dispersed by Parliamentarian forces. The following year the Devonshire Trained Bands loyal to Parliament refused to invade Cornwall. Once Parliament had established full control in 1648 it passed legislation to reorganise the militia in various counties, including an Ordinance to settle the Militia of Devon on 7 June (after which the term 'Trained Band' began to disappear in most counties). Under the Commonwealth and Protectorate the militia received pay when called out, and operated alongside the New Model Army to control the country. After the Restoration of the monarchy in 1660 the militia of Devon were called out on a number of occasions when the appearance of hostile fleets caused alarm. For example, on 15 July 1667 the Dutch fleet anchored in Plymouth Sound and all the militia of Devon and Cornwall were assembled.

== Monmouth's Rebellion ==
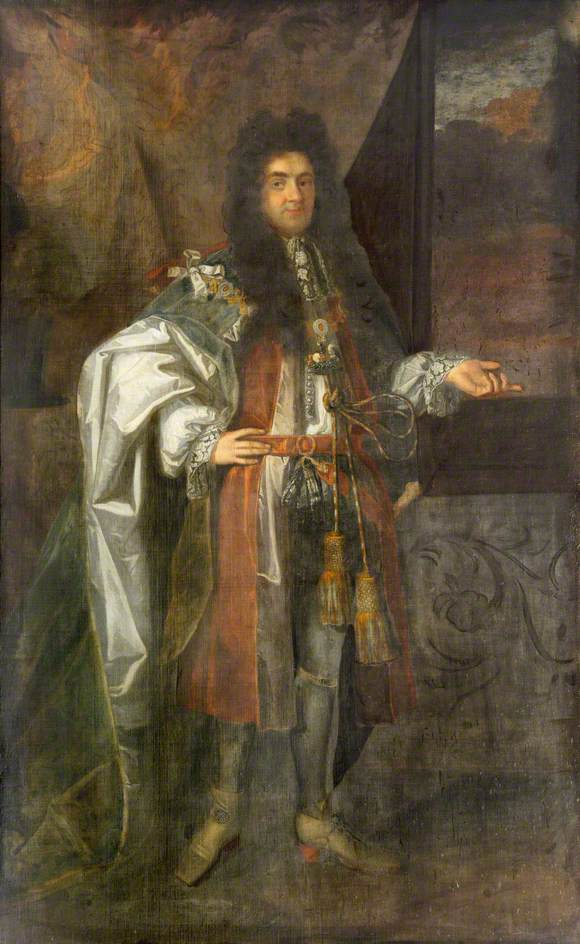
Christopher Monck, 2nd Duke of Albemarle, Lord Lieutenant of Devon and commander of the Devon Militia 1675–85.

When the Duke of Monmouth landed in Dorset to launch his Rebellion in 1685, the Lord Lieutenant of neighbouring Devon was the Duke of Albemarle. Albemarle was known to emphasise the training of his militia, which consisted of six regiments of infantry and one of cavalry; the cities of Exeter and Plymouth also had a regiment each. Albemarle mustered the regiments at Exeter and then marched towards Dorset even before orders arrived from London to do so. Confronting the rebels at Axminster, his cavalry probed forwards. Macaulay asserted that the Devonshire men were ready to go over to Monmouth, and this caused Albemarle to retreat, which turned into a rout, the countryside strewn with abandoned weapons and uniforms. Macaulay has been followed uncritically by many authors, but modern historians find no evidence of this rout (although the Somerset Militia were also present at Axminster and performed poorly; some may even have deserted and joined the rebel duke). Albemarle only had orders to shadow the rebels, not to bring on a major action. He fell back to secure the west and his force's presence prevented Monmouth from accessing recruits and supplies from that direction. He then followed the rebels, re-occupying towns and garrisoning the small ports to prevent foreign aid reaching them. After the Battle of Sedgemoor the Devon Militia were active in rounding up fugitive rebels. Despite their service against Monmouth, James II stood the militia down within days of the rebellion's defeat, intending to use the local militia taxes to pay for his expanding Regular Army, which he felt he could rely upon, unlike the locally commanded militia. The Devon Militia was ordered not to muster for training in 1687, and was not embodied when William of Orange made his landing in the West Country in 1688 (the Glorious Revolution).

In July 1690 the French fleet anchored off Teignmouth after the Battle of Beachy Head, and sent a landing party to raid the town. The Devon Militia mustered, but the raiding party had re-embarked. The Devon Militia continued to be mustered for training during the reign of William III, notably in 1697, when the eight infantry regiments and four troops of horse in Devonshire (Six 'county' regiments and three troops, together with the Exeter and Plymouth regiments and the independent Dartmouth Company of Horse) mustered 6163 men under the command of the Earl of Stamford as Lord Lieutenant. But after the Treaty of Utrecht in 1713 the militia was allowed to dwindle.

== Devon Militia 1758 ==
Under threat of French invasion during the Seven Years' War a series of Militia Acts from 1757 re-established county militia regiments, the men being conscripted by means of parish ballots (paid substitutes were permitted) to serve for three years. Front-line Devonshire was given a quota of 1600 men to raise. There was a property qualification for officers, who were commissioned by the Lord Lieutenant. The size of the militia was increased as the war continued. Once again, the maritime counties were to the fore: the first issue of arms to the Devon Militia was made on 5 December 1758, and they were embodied on 23 June 1759. Two, later four (Exeter, North, East and South), battalions were formed in Devon under the command of the Duke of Bedford as Lord Lieutenant. They served in the West Country for the whole of their service; the duties included guarding French prisoners of war and assisting Revenue Officers in suppressing smuggling. In December 1762 the battalions were disembodied and the following year were reorganised into three peacetime regiments. The Exeter and East battalions combined to form a single regiment, the 1st or East Devon Militia, with its headquarters (HQ) at Exeter and the Duke of Bedford as its Colonel. Sir John Prideaux, 6th Baronet, Colonel of the East Devon regiment, took legal action against the Duke of Bedford and the Deputy lieutenants for the loss of his command, and refused to give up the regimental arms and accoutrements in his care until 1764.

=== 1st or East Devon Militia ===
The militiamen's peacetime obligation was for 28 days' annual training. This was widely neglected, but the Devonshire regiments do appear to have completed their training each year.

==== War of American Independence ====
After the outbreak of the War of American Independence in 1775 a controversial Act of Parliament was passed to 'Enable His Majesty to call out and assemble the Militia in all cases of Rebellion in any part of the Dominion belonging to the Crown of Great Britain'. In the event the militia was called out in its traditional role when Britain was threatened with invasion by the Americans' allies, France and Spain. The regiment was embodied at Exeter on 20 April 1778 and served in the West Country and Southern England. It spent the summer of 1779 at Coxheath Camp near Maidstone in Kent, which was the army's largest training camp, where the Militia were exercised as part of a division alongside Regular troops while providing a reserve in case of French invasion of South East England. In the summer of 1780 the regiment was camped at Playden Heights in Sussex, while the summers of 1781 and 1782 were spent in Devon at Roborough Camp near Plymouth, where all three Devon regiments were gathered. The Light Companies of the regiments at Roborough were formed into a composite Light Battalion, which trained separately. The Militia also had to find guards for the American prisoners of war lodged in Mill Prison in Plymouth and Stapleton Prison in Bristol. American independence was recognised in November 1782, so the East Devons were ordered to march to Exeter and disembodied on 24 March 1783.

==== French Revolutionary War ====
From 1784 to 1793 the Devon Militia regiments were assembled for their annual 28 days' training, but to save money only two-thirds of the men were mustered each year. In view of the worsening international situation the Devonshire Militia was embodied for service on 22 December 1792, even though Revolutionary France did not declare war on Britain until 1 February 1793. The duty was much as before, guarding French prisoners at Bristol or Plymouth, with summer training camps or autumn manoeuvres at Roborough. In March 1798 the standing militia regiments were reinforced by men from the newly raised Supplementary Militia, the remainder forming new regiments (such as the 4th Devon Militia formed at Exeter). However, in November 1799 the Militia was partially disembodied, together with the whole of the Supplementary Militia; the hope was that the men dismissed would join the Regular Army. In March 1801 the regiment was involved in suppressing bread riots and looting in Plymouth and the men who had been disembodied were recalled to the colours. However, a peace treaty having been agreed (the Treaty of Amiens), the 1st Devon was disembodied on 20 April.

==== Napoleonic Wars ====
The Peace of Amiens did not last long, and the Militia were soon called out again. The warrant to embody the Devon and Exeter Militia was sent to the Lord Lieutenant (Earl Fortescue) on 11 March 1803, and the 1st Devon of eight companies was practically complete by 5 April.It marched to Plymouth Dock, where the garrison include all three Devon Militia regiments. The duties once again included guarding French prisoners and working on fortifications. In June the Supplementary Militia was also embodied, and the 1st Devon Militia was increased to 10 companies. In 1805 there was a drive to induce militiamen to volunteer for the Regular Army (or the Royal Marines, in the case of men from Devon and Cornwall). The regiment served in the Portsmouth garrison and the Brighton brigade before returning to the West Country in late 1806. Another recruitment drive for men to transfer to the Line regiments was accompanied by balloting to bring the Militia up to strength, together with recruits obtained 'by beat of drum' (as in the Line) and from the Local Militia.

In 1810–12 the regiment moved around Southern England. In 1812 there was an outbreak of Luddite machine-breaking and the regiment spent much of the year constantly on the move round the industrial Midlands before returning to Plymouth in 1813. The war was ended by the Treaty of Fontainebleau in 1814 and on 16 June the warrant for disembodying the Devon Militia was signed.

==== Ireland ====
Napoleon's escape from Elba and return to power in France in 1815 meant that the Militia had to be called out once more. The regiments began recruiting for volunteers 'by beat of drum' from 25 April and the warrant for embodying the Devonshire Militia was issued on 16 June, with the 1st Devon to be embodied at Exeter on 24 July. By then the decisive Battle of Waterloo had already been fought, but the process of embodiment went on while the Regulars were away in the Army of Occupation in France. The 1st Devons served in Ireland from November to April 1816, when they returned to Plymouth and were disembodied.

==== Long Peace ====
In 1817 an Act was passed that allowed the annual training of the Militia to be dispensed with, so although officers continued to be commissioned into the regiment and the ballot was regularly held, the selected men were rarely mustered for drill. The Devon regiments assembled for 28 days' drill in 1820, and for 21 days the following year. Training was held again in 1825 and 1831, but not again before 1852. The permanent staffs of the regiments were progressively reduced so that by 1835 each had only the adjutant, sergeant-major and six sergeants, while the long-serving men were pensioned off. In 1847 the permanent staff and pensioners of the 1st Devons were called out to assist special constables to put down food riots in Exeter.

=== 2nd or North Devon Militia ===
The regiment's HQ was at Barnstaple. Its service history was similar to the East Devons: it was embodied in May 1778 for service during War of American Independence, all of which was carried out in the southern counties of England, as was its service in the French Revolutionary War. In 1794 it was in Kent, then spent several years at Plymouth and at Roborough Camp. When the Militia was partially disembodied in 1799 the regiment provided a large contingent to the Regulars, but the colonel, Earl Fortescue, resigned in protest. Afterwards the regiment served at Portsmouth and Weymouth Camp in Dorset. In November 1801 it moved back to Plymouth and it was disembodied 19 April 1802.

When the Peace of Amiens broke down the regiment was re-embodied on 31 March 1803 and sent to Plymouth. It remained in the West Country until it joined the East Devons in Portsmouth in 1805, where it stayed for two years. This was followed by service in Bristol and Weymouth, then three more years in the Plymouth garrison. From 1811 to 1814 the regiment was in Gosport, and was disembodied on 30 July 1814. It served in the Plymouth garrison again during the 1815–16 embodiment, and then like the rest of the militia became moribund during the Long Peace.

=== 3rd or South Devon Militia ===
The regiment's HQ was at Plymouth and its service history was similar to the East Devons. It served with the other Devon regiments at Plymouth and Roborough during the War of American Independence and again in the French Revolutionary War. However, the South Devon regiment volunteered for service in Ireland and was stationed there during the Rebellion of 1798–99. During the Napoleonic Wars it mainly served in the southern and western counties, but during the Luddite disturbances of 1812 it was quartered in the Nottingham area. As with the other regiments it was disembodied in August 1814 and re-embodied during the Waterloo campaign from 17 July 1815 to 8 February 1816.

=== 4th Devon Militia ===
As the French invasion threat grew in 1797 the Militia was doubled in size: each county was given an additional quota of men to raise for the Supplementary Militia. In Devonshire some of these were distributed among the existing regiments while the others were formed in March 1798 into the 4th Devon Militia at Exeter under the command of Sir Bourchier Wrey, 7th Baronet. However, the whole of the Supplementary Militia was disembodied in November 1799.

=== Precedence ===
Because there was no established order of precedence among Militia regiments, they traditionally drew lots for precedence when brigaded together in camp; this became an annual ballot between the counties. The Devons had their own order of precedence, which was several times re-asserted. Then in 1833 all the individual Militia regiments were balloted for a permanent order of precedence and the Devon regiments were assigned the following numbers:

- East Devon – 41
- North Devon – 15
- South Devon – 25

Normally this only affected matters such as positions on the parade ground, but it would have ramifications for the Devonshire regiments later in the century.

== Reform 1852 ==
The Militia of the United Kingdom was reformed by the Militia Act 1852, enacted during a period of international tension. As before, units were raised and administered on a county basis, and filled by voluntary enlistment (although conscription by means of the Militia Ballot might be used if the counties failed to meet their quotas). Training was for 56 days on enlistment, then for 21–28 days per year, during which the men received full army pay. The permanent staff was increased. Under the Act, Militia units could be embodied by Royal Proclamation for full-time home defence service in three circumstances:

1. 'Whenever a state of war exists between Her Majesty and any foreign power'.
2. 'In all cases of invasion or upon imminent danger thereof'.
3. 'In all cases of rebellion or insurrection'.

Under the Act, the militia establishment for Devon was fixed at two regiments of infantry and one of artillery; the North Devon regiment was converted to artillery and its HQ moved to Plymouth, while the South Devons became the 2nd Devon Militia.

=== 1st Devon Militia ===
War having broken out with Russia in 1854 and an expeditionary force sent to the Crimea, the Militia were called out. The 1st Devon Militia was embodied on 18 December and served in Wales and Ireland before returning to England in June 1856 to be disembodied.

From 1858 the regiment regularly held its annual peacetime training, the recruits and non-commissioned officers having previously assembled for basic training. In November 1867 the permanent staff of the regiment were called out to help deal with bread riots in Exeter, and during the Fenian scare in 1867 the regiment posted guards over the military stores at Exeter. That year the Militia Reserve Act came into force, whereby in exchange for a bounty the militiamen could sign up for service with the Regulars in time of war. The Militia Reserve was called out in the summer of 1878 during the international crisis preceding the Congress of Berlin, the men of the 1st Devons being attached to the 1st Battalion 11th Foot at Devonport. From 1871 the Militia were permitted to camp for their annual training, and the following year the 1st Devons carried out its first camp since 1813, and the following year took part in division-scale manoeuvres at Roborough Down. However, the unpopularity of camps led to a falling-off in recruitment and the Devon Militia regiments were each reduced by two companies in 1876.

=== 2nd or South Devon Militia ===
The 2nd Devon Militia was embodied from 31 May 1854 to 10 June 1856 during the Crimean War. Unlike the other Devon units, the regiment was also embodied from 9 November 1857 to 14 May 1858 during the Indian mutiny. Thereafter the regiment carried out its annual training regularly.

=== Devon Artillery Militia ===
The North Devon Militia was converted into the Devon Artillery Militia in May 1853. Most of the officers transferred to the new corps, together with volunteers of sufficient physique; deficiencies in men of the correct height were made up by exchanges with the two infantry regiments. The new regiment established its HQ at Devonport. The unit was embodied for full-time duty in home defence from January 1855 to June 1856 during the Crimean War. It volunteered for overseas service but was not accepted. Under the mobilisation scheme that appeared from 1875, the Devon Artillery's war station was in the Fortifications of Plymouth.

The Artillery Militia was reorganised into 11 territorial divisions of garrison artillery on 1 April 1882, the regiments formally becoming 'brigades' of the Royal Artillery. The Devon unit became the 3rd Brigade, Western Division, RA . It was embodied on 9 March 1885 when an international crisis arose over the Panjdeh incident while much of the Regular Army was simultaneously engaged on the Nile Expedition, but it was stood down on 30 September 1885. The garrison artillery divisions were reduced to just three from 1 July 1889, and county titles were adopted once more, with the Plymouth unit becoming The Devon Artillery (Western Division, RA). The RA abandoned its divisional structure in 1902 and the Militia Artillery became part of the Royal Garrison Artillery, the Devonport unit becoming the Devon RGA (Militia).

== Devonshire Regiment ==
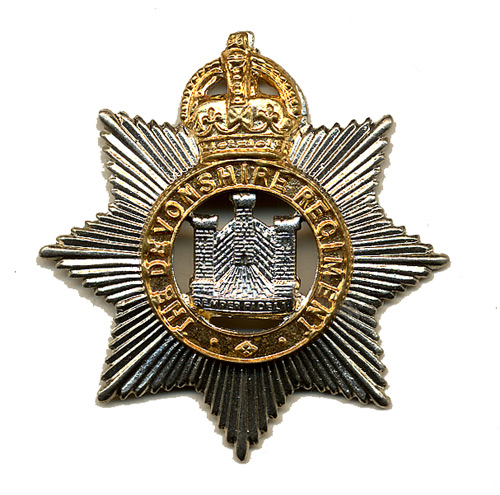
The badge of the East Devon Militia, adopted by the whole of the Devonshire Regiment in 1883.

Under the 'Localisation of the Forces' scheme introduced by the Cardwell Reforms of 1872, Militia infantry regiments were grouped into county brigades with their local Regular and Volunteer battalions. For the 1st and 2nd Devons this was Brigade No 34 (County of Devon) in Western District alongside the 11th Foot and the Devonshire Volunteers] The Militia were now controlled by the War Office rather than their county Lord Lieutenant, and officers' commissions were signed by the Queen. A mobilisation scheme began to appear in the Army List from December 1875. This assigned places in an order of battle to Militia units serving with Regular units in an 'Active Army' and a 'Garrison Army'. The 1st and 2nd Devon Militia were both assigned to the Garrison Army in the Plymouth defences.

The Childers Reforms of 1881 took Cardwell's reforms further, and the Militia infantry regiments became integral parts of their Regular county regiment. The 11th Foot became the Devonshire Regiment of two battalions and the two Devon Militia regiments becoming the 3rd and 4th battalions. This caused some confusion: the 1833 order of precedence had been confirmed for infantry militia units in 1855, which meant that 1st Devons ranked as No 41, the 2nd Devons as No 25. The 2nd or South Devons therefore became the 3rd Battalion, Devonshire Regiment by virtue of their higher precedence, and the 1st Devons became the 4th Battalion. However, the whole Devonshire Regiment did adopt the old East Devon Militia's cap badge and motto.

The 4th Battalion volunteered for garrison service during the Anglo-Egyptian War of 1882, but none of the Militia were embodied. The 4th Battalion was also offered for garrison duty during the Panjdeh crisis, but was politely declined. The Devonshire Militia battalions were further reduced in 1890, to an establishment of six companies each.

=== Second Boer War ===
With the bulk of the Regular Army serving in South Africa during the Second Boer War, the Militia were called out. The 4th Battalion was embodied from 11 May 1900 to 16 July 1901, serving in the garrison of the Channel Isles. The Devon Artillery Militia was also embodied from 1 May to 17 October 1900.

== Special Reserve ==
After the Boer War, the future of the Militia was called into question. There were moves to reform the Auxiliary Forces (Militia, Yeomanry and Volunteers) to take their place in the six Army Corps proposed by St John Brodrick as Secretary of State for War. However, little of Brodrick's scheme was carried out. Under the sweeping Haldane Reforms of 1908, the Militia was replaced by the Special Reserve, a semi-professional force whose role was to provide reinforcement drafts for Regular units serving overseas in wartime

Under these changes, the 3rd (2nd Devon Militia) Battalion was disbanded, and the 4th (1st Devon Militia) became the 3rd (Reserve) Battalion, Devonshire Regiment on 1 April 1908. Although the Devon RGA (M) was due to transfer to the Special Reserve Royal Field Artillery it was disbanded in March 1909.

=== World War I and after ===
When World War I broke out on 4 August 1914 the Special Reserve battalion was embodied at Exeter and moved to its war station at Plymouth on 8 August. It returned to Exeter on 28 August to fulfil its role of organising drafts of Special Reservists and returning Regular reservists for the 1st Battalion serving with the British Expeditionary Force. The battalion was soon overwhelmed by returning reservists and recruits flocking to enlist, and by the end of September 1914 it was three times its establishment strength. In May 1915 it moved to Devonport where it formed part of the Plymouth Garrison for the rest of the war.

Although the Supplementary Reserve (renamed Militia again in 1921) remained in existence after 1919 and a small number of officers were commissioned, the infantry militia dwindled away: by the outbreak of World War II 3rd Bn Devonshires had no officers listed. The Militia was formally disbanded in April 1953.

== Insignia ==
The first pairs of Colours issued to the Devonshire Militia battalions in 1758 consisted of the Union flag for the King's Colour, and one bearing the Duke of Bedford's coat of arms for the Regimental Colour. The regimental badge of the 1st or East Devon Militia from the date of its formation was a heraldic castle (representing Exeter Castle) with the motto Semper fidelis (Ever faithful), allegedly to commemorate the defence of the city by the Trained Bands during the English Civil War. This badge was officially authorised by the Lord Lieutenant in 1860, and was adopted by the whole Devonshire Regiment in 1883. The badge of the North Devon Militia was a crowned garter (of the Order of the Garter) carrying the unit title and enclosing the Union Flag of 1707–1801; by 1812 the outmoded flag was replaced by a crown within the garter. The South Devon Militia used a lion rampant (derived from the coat of arms of the early Earls of Devon) within a garter inscribed with the regimental title.

== See also ==
- Militia (English)
- Militia (Great Britain)
- Militia (United Kingdom)
- Special Reserve
- Devon Trained Bands
- East Devon Militia
- North Devon Militia
- South Devon Militia
- Devon Artillery Militia
