= North Devon Militia =

Auxiliary unit of the British Army

North Devon Militia Devon Artillery Militia Devon Royal Garrison Artillery (Militia)
- Active: 1758–1909
- Country: Kingdom of Great Britain (1758–1800); United Kingdom (1801–1909)
- Branch: Militia
- Type: Infantry; Artillery
- Garrison/HQ: Barnstaple; Devonport (after 1853)

Commanders
- Notable commanders: Sir George Stucley, Bt

The North Devon Militia, later the Devon Artillery Militia, was a part-time military unit in the maritime county of Devonshire in the West of England. The Militia had always been important in the county, which was vulnerable to invasion, and from its formal creation in 1758 the regiment served in home defence in all Britain's major wars until 1909. Having always been an infantry regiment, the North Devon Militia was converted into an artillery unit in 1853, with a role in manning the forts that protected the vital naval base at Plymouth.

== Background ==
The universal obligation to military service in the Shire levy was long established in England and its legal basis was updated by two acts of 1557 (4 & 5 Ph. & M. cc. 2 and 3), which placed selected men, the 'Trained Bands', under the command of Lords Lieutenant appointed by the monarch. This is seen as the starting date for the organised county militia in England. The Devon Trained Bands were divided into three 'Divisions' (East, North and South), which were called out in the Armada year of 1588.

Although control of the militia was one of the areas of dispute between King Charles I and Parliament that led to the First English Civil War, most of the county Trained Bands played little part in the fighting. After the Restoration of the monarchy in 1660 the militia of Devon were called out on a number of occasions when the appearance of hostile fleets caused alarm, and in 1685 they prevented the rebel Duke of Monmouth from accessing recruits and supplies from Devon and Cornwall. After the Battle of Sedgemoor the Devon Militia were active in rounding up rebels.

The Devonshire Militia continued to be mustered for training during the reign of William III, the six 'county' regiments together with the Exeter and Plymouth regiments and several Troops of Horse, mustering 6163 men. But after the Treaty of Utrecht in 1713 the militia was allowed to dwindle.

== North Devon Militia ==
=== Seven Years' War ===
Under threat of French invasion during the Seven Years' War a series of Militia Acts from 1757 re-established county militia regiments, the men being conscripted by means of parish ballots (paid substitutes were permitted) to serve for three years. Front-line Devonshire was given a quota of 1600 men to raise. There was a property qualification for officers, who were commissioned by the Lord Lieutenant. The size of the militia was increased as the war continued. Once again, the maritime counties were to the fore: the first issue of arms to the Devon Militia was made on 5 December 1758, and they were embodied on 23 June 1759. Two, later four (North, South, East and Exeter), battalions were formed in Devon under the command of the Duke of Bedford as Lord Lieutenant. From 1759 to 1763 the North Devon regiment was stationed in Cornwall to assist Revenue Officers in suppressing smuggling. Detachments were stationed at Mevagissey, Padstow and many other places. In 1763 the battalions were reorganised into three regiments, including the 2nd or North Devon Militia of 500 men, 25 Sergeants and 16 Drummers, organised into eight companies, with its headquarters (HQ) at Barnstaple.

=== War of American Independence ===
The regiment was stood down ('disembodied') in 1761, after which the militiamen's peacetime obligation was for 28 days' annual training. This was widely neglected, but the Devonshire regiments do appear to have completed their training each year. However, when the militia was called out again in 1778 during the War of American Independence (when Britain was threatened with invasion by the Americans' allies, France and Spain), the North Devon regiment was inspected and found to be 'in so shamefully unmilitary a state as to be returned unfit for service'. This was attributed to the frequent absence through illness of the commanding officer (CO), Col Sir Bourchier Wrey, 6th Baronet, who had now resigned. The lieutenant-colonel and major were both superseded, and Lt-Col Paul Orchard of the East Devon Militia was promoted to command the North Devon regiment. The regiment was then embodied in May 1778 for service, all of which was in the southern counties of England. Each summer, Militia regiments were gathered in camps for collective training: the North Devons spent the summer of 1779 at Portsmouth Common Camp, 1780 as part of a brigade under Lieutenant-General Simon Fraser in a training camp at Waterdown Forest, near Tunbridge Wells, and 1781 and 1782 in Devon at Roborough Camp and Maker near Plymouth, where both Regulars and Militia (including all three Devon regiments) were gathered. The Light Companies of the regiments at Roborough were formed into a composite Light Battalion, which trained separately. The Militia also had to find guards for the American prisoners of war lodged in Mill Prison. The camp at Roborough was broken up on 10 November 1782 and the regiments went into winter quarters (at Taunton and Bridgwater in Somerset for the North Devons). At the end of the war the North Devons were disembodied at Bideford and Barnstaple on 4 March 1783.

=== French Revolutionary War ===
From 1787 to 1793 the East Devon Militia was assembled for its annual 28 days' training, usually at Bideford, but to save money only two-thirds of the men were mustered each year. In view of the worsening international situation the whole Devonshire Militia was embodied for service on 22 December 1792, even though Revolutionary France did not declare war on Britain until 1 February 1793. The Militia could be employed anywhere in the country for home defence, manning garrisons, guarding prisoners of war, and for internal security, while the Regular Army regarded them as a source of trained men if they could be persuaded to transfer. In practice the North Devon Militia remained in the southern counties during their periods of embodied service. In June 1793 both the North and South Devon regiments marched to join a large militia training encampment at Broadwater Common, Waterdown Forest, outside Tunbridge Wells. The whole camp moved to Ashdown Forest at the beginning of August and then to Brighton for two weeks before returning to Broadwater Common. The camp broke up in the autumn and the regiments went to their separate winter quarters. During the winter of 1793–94 The North Devons were at Sevenoaks in Kent, then spent the summer of 1794 at Hythe Camp before returning west to Taunton for the winter. In the summer of 1795 the North Devons were brigaded with the East Devons at Roborough Camp. The regiment spent the next two years at Plymouth, where all three Devon regiments spent the winter of 1795–6 in barracks at Plymouth Dock. The Grenadier and Light Companies were again taken from all the regiments in the district to form composite battalions. As the invasion threat grew the Militia was doubled in size: each county was given an additional quota of men to raise for the Supplementary Militia. In Devonshire some of these were formed into a fourth regiment under Sir Bourchier Wrey, 7th Baronet, while the others were distributed among the existing regiments in March 1798: by 1799 the North Devon Militia had a strength of 1128 men, well above the usual establishment of a battalion. The North Devons spent the summer of 1798 at Moreleigh Camp, then wintered in Barnstaple and Bideford.

With the militia liable for service anywhere in the country, their traditional local defence duties had been taken over by the Volunteers. In November 1799 the Militia was partially disembodied, two-fifths of the men being stood down together with the whole of the Supplementary Militia. The hope was that the men dismissed from service would enlist in the Regular Army – 247 men from the North Devons did so – but the disbandment was not popular with the Militia colonels, and the North Devons' colonel, Earl Fortescue, resigned in protest. In the North Devons the two companies of volunteers (as opposed to balloted men) had been raised by their captains at some expense, but as the junior companies they were the ones ordered to be disbanded. Having made representations to the Home Office, they were allowed to be kept on the establishment.

The North Devons spent the summer months of 1799 at Lymington in Hampshire and then went into barracks round Portsmouth and Gosport until the summer of 1801, when it moved to Weymouth Camp in Dorset. In November 1801 the regiment moved back to Plymouth, where there had been bread riots earlier in the year and where the countryside was still disturbed. A peace treaty having been agreed (the Treaty of Amiens), the Militia began to be disembodied in early 1802. The North Devons marched home to Barnstaple and disembodied on 19 April 1802.

=== Napoleonic Wars ===
However, the Peace of Amiens did not last long, and the order to call out the Devonshire Militia was sent to the Lord Lieutenant (Earl Fortescue) on 11 March 1803. The North Devon regiment was re-embodied on 31 March and sent to Plymouth on 25 May. Here the Devonshire regiments trained alongside the Regulars, with particular emphasis on the Light Companies, and six chosen men from each of the other companies trained as marksmen alongside the Light Companies. Rewards were posted on 1 August for the apprehension of seven men who had not rejoined the regiment and were listed as deserters. Soon afterwards the Supplementary Militia were also called out to reinforce the standing militia regiments. The regiment camped at Efford and then wintered round Plympton and Saltash, before moving to Pendennis Castle in 1804 and Exeter in 1805. In 1805 there was a drive to induce militiamen to volunteer for the Regular Army (or the Royal Marines, in the case of men from Devon and Cornwall).

During the summer of 1805, while Napoleon's 'Army of England' massed at Boulogne and threatened invasion, the regiment was camped at Woodbury and then moved to Lympstone Camp, where it joined Lt-Gen Charles Lennox's militia brigade. On 1 September the regiment was 665 strong under the command of Lt-Col Charles Hayne. On 15 September the brigade marched to Hemerdon camp, arriving on 20 September. This camp was broken up on 22 December and the regiment moved to Portsmouth where it was quartered in Portsea Barracks and brigaded with the East Devon and North Hampshire Militia.

The regiment spent the next two years in the Portsmouth area, at Gosport, Haslar, Portsea and Southsea Camp. It then spent the winter of 1807–8 in Bristol before spending a year at Weymouth, followed by over three years (May 1808 to November 1811) back at Plymouth. In 1809 another recruitment drive for men to transfer to the Line regiments was accompanied by balloting to bring the Militia up to strength, and the regiments were allowed to obtain recruits 'by beat of drum' (as in regiments of the Line) and by volunteers from the Local Militia, which had replaced the Volunteer Corps.

From November 1811 to May 1814 the North Devons were stationed at Gosport, including Fort Monckton. The regiment moved to Dartmoor in June, but by then the war was over, the Treaty of Fontainebleau having been signed in April. On 16 June the warrant for disembodying the Devonshire Militia was signed. The regiment marched to Barnstaple to be disembodied on 30 July 1814.

Napoleon's escape from Elba and return to power in France in 1815 meant that the Militia had to be called out once more. The regiments began recruiting for volunteers 'by beat of drum' from 25 April and the warrant for embodying the Devonshire Militia was issued on 16 June, with the North Devon to be embodied at Barnstaple on 17 July. By then the decisive Battle of Waterloo had already been fought, but the process of embodiment went on while the Regulars were away in the Army of Occupation in France. The regiment left Barnstaple on 9 August 1815 and was at Plymouth three days later, where it served in the garrison until 4 February 1816. It then returned to Barnstaple to disembody on 9 February.

=== Long Peace ===
The Militia Act 1817 allowed the annual training of the Militia to be dispensed with. So although officers continued to be commissioned into the regiment and the ballot was regularly held, the selected men were rarely mustered for drill. The regiment assembled at Barnstaple for 28 days' drill in 1820, and for 21 days the following year. The Devonshire Militia's training of June 1825 resulted in newspaper advertisements offering rewards for the capture of deserters (31 of them from the North Devon regiment). Training was held at Barnstaple in February 1831, but not again before 1852.The ballot lapsed and the permanent staff of the militia, which had been reduced in 1819 to the adjutant, paymaster and surgeon, sergeant-major and drum-major, one sergeant and corporal for every 40 men, and one drummer for every two companies plus the flank companies, were progressively reduced so that by 1835 there were only the adjutant, sergeant-major and six sergeants, and the other long-serving men were pensioned off. (In 1834 an inspecting officer had found nine of them unfit for service) was progressively reduced.

== Devon Artillery Militia ==
The Militia of the United Kingdom was reformed by the Militia Act 1852, enacted during a period of international tension. As before, units were raised and administered on a county basis, and filled by voluntary enlistment (although conscription by means of the Militia Ballot might be used if the counties failed to meet their quotas). Training was for 56 days on enlistment, then for 21–28 days per year, during which the men received full army pay. Under the Act, Militia units could be embodied by Royal Proclamation for full-time home defence service in three circumstances:

1. 'Whenever a state of war exists between Her Majesty and any foreign power'.
2. 'In all cases of invasion or upon imminent danger thereof'.
3. 'In all cases of rebellion or insurrection'.

The 1852 Act introduced Militia Artillery units in addition to the traditional infantry regiments. Their role was to man coastal defences and fortifications, relieving the Royal Artillery (RA) for active service. Under the Act, the militia establishment for Devon was fixed at two regiments of infantry and one of artillery, and the North Devon Militia was converted into the Devon Artillery Militia in May 1853. The Colonel, Lord Poltimore, retired and Lt-Col George Buck (formerly of the Royal Horse Guards), the Surgeon, and most of the other officers of the North Devon Militia transferred to the new corps, together with 367 volunteers, all over 5 feet 6 inches (1.68 m) in height; deficiencies in men of the correct height were made up by exchanging men with the two infantry regiments. The new regiment assembled at the Cavalry Barracks at Exeter, and then established its HQ at Devonport, Plymouth. The unit was embodied for full-time duty in home defence from January 1855 to June 1856 during the Crimean War. It volunteered for overseas service but was not accepted. (Note: In 1853 the records of the disbanded regiment were destroyed, thus few records survive from which its history could be written)

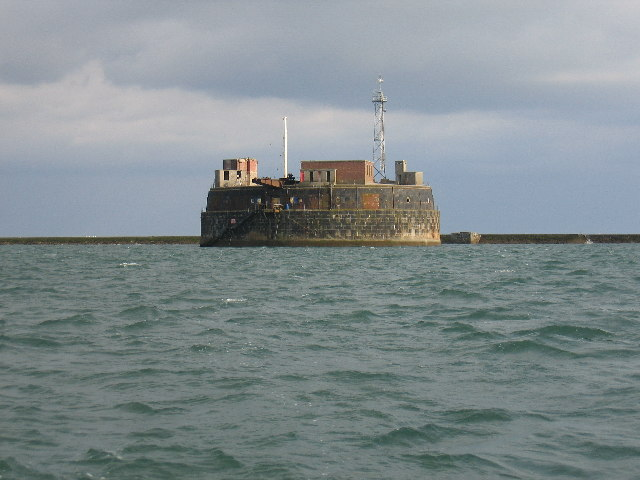
Plymouth Breakwater Fort, completed in 1879.

After the Cardwell Reforms the Militia were controlled by the War Office rather than their county Lord Lieutenant, and officers' commissions were signed by the Queen. A mobilisation scheme began to appear in the Army List from December 1875. This assigned places to Militia Artillery units in an order of battle for the 'Garrison Army': the Devon Artillery's war station was in the Plymouth defences, including Staddon Fort, Fort Bovisand, Breakwater, Maker Heights and the Whitsand Bay works.

The Artillery Militia was reorganised into 11 territorial divisions of garrison artillery on 1 April 1882, the regiments formally becoming 'brigades' of the RA. The Devon unit became the 3rd Brigade, Western Division, RA. The unit was embodied on 9 March 1885 when an international crisis arose over the Panjdeh incident while much of the Regular Army was simultaneously engaged on the Nile Expedition, but it was stood down on 30 September 1885. The garrison artillery divisions were reduced to just three from 1 July 1889, and county titles were adopted once more, with the Plymouth unit becoming The Devon Artillery (Western Division, RA).

The Devon Artillery were embodied from 1 May to 17 October 1900 during the Second Boer War.

The RA abandoned its divisional structure in 1902 and the Militia Artillery became part of the Royal Garrison Artillery, the Devonport unit becoming the Devon RGA (Militia).

== Disbandment ==
After the Boer War, the future of the Militia was called into question. There were moves to reform the Auxiliary Forces (Militia, Yeomanry and Volunteers) to take their place in the six Army Corps proposed by St John Brodrick as Secretary of State for War. Some batteries of Militia Artillery were to be converted to field artillery. However, little of Brodrick's scheme was carried out.

Under the sweeping Haldane Reforms of 1908, the Militia was replaced by the Special Reserve, a semi-professional force whose role was to provide reinforcement drafts for Regular units serving overseas in wartime. Although the Devon RGA (M) was due to transfer to the Special Reserve Royal Field Artillery (under the title Devon Royal Reserve Field Artillery, all these units were disbanded in March 1909.

== Commanders ==
=== Colonels ===
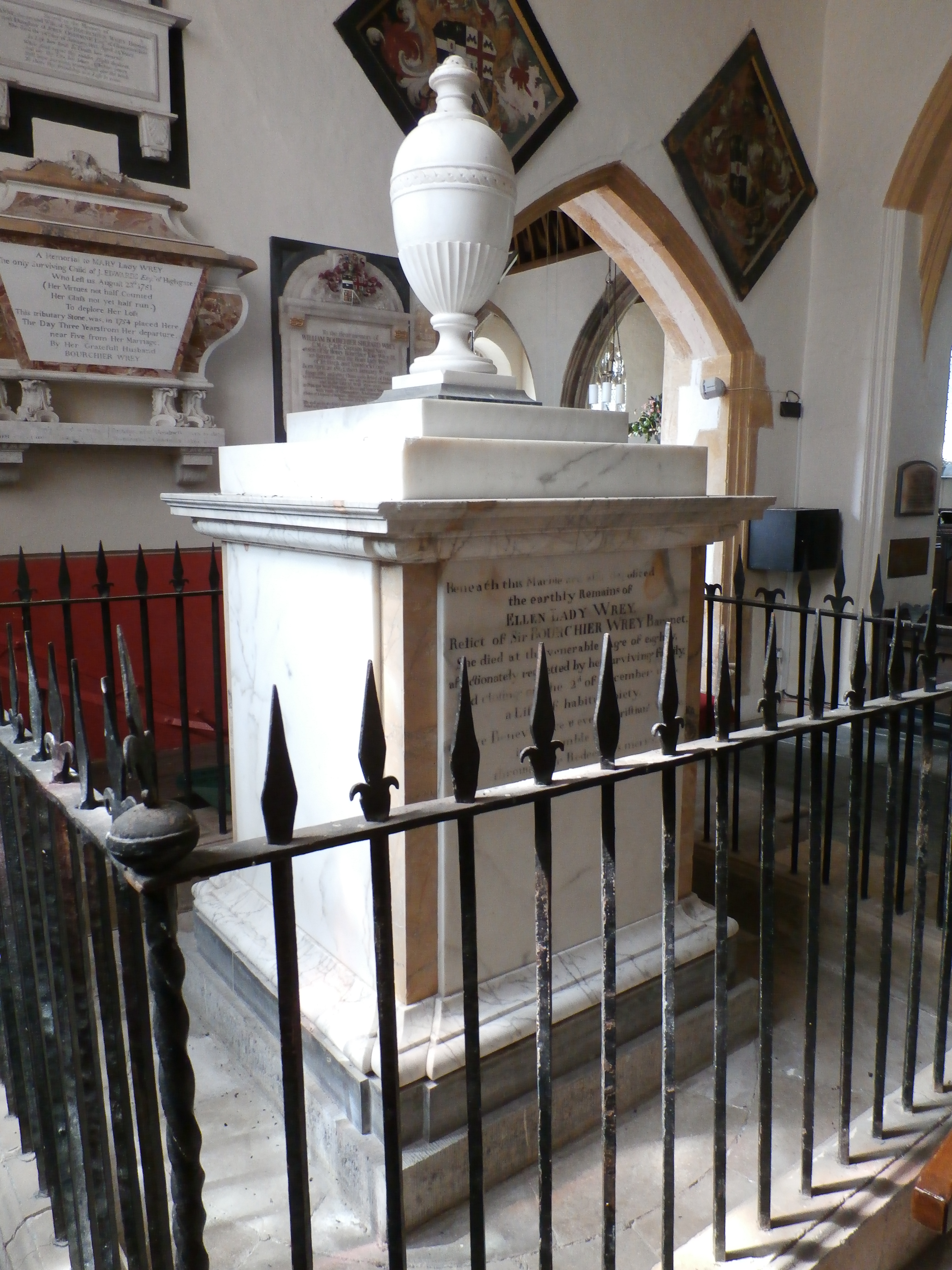
Monument in Tawstock Church, Devon, to Sir Bourchier Wrey, 6th Baronet, Colonel of the North Devon Militia for 19 years, died 1784.

The following served as Colonel of the Regiment from its re-establishment in 1758:

- (1758–1779) Sir Bourchier Wrey, 6th Baronet (c. 1715–1784) of Tawstock Court, "nineteen Years Colonel of the North-Devon Regiment of Militia", as stated on the inscription on his monument in Tawstock Church. He resigned in 1779.
- (28 January 1779 – 1792) Paul II Orchard (1739–1812) of Hartland Abbey. He had previously served as Lt-Col of the 1st Devon Militia (1773–9). Resigned 1792. A portrait by Joshua Reynolds survives of him dressed in military uniform.
- (28 September 1792 – 1799) Hugh Fortescue, 1st Earl Fortescue (1753–1841) of Castle Hill, Filleigh. Resigned 1799.
- (1 November 1799 – 1830) John Parker, 2nd Baron Borringdon (1772–1840) (after 1815 1st Earl of Morley) of Saltram and North Molton. He had previously served as Lt-Col from 1 June 1794. resigned/died 1830.
- (6 December 1830 – 1852) Sir George Warwick Bampfylde, 6th Baronet (1786–1858) (after 1831 1st Baron Poltimore, of Poltimore and North Molton. Resigned 1852, prior to disbandment of regiment. (Note: In 1830 Bampfylde was listed as one of the subscribers to Gribble's Memorials of Barnstaple as 'Colonel Commandant of the North Devon Regiment of Militia' (Gribble established the Barnstaple Iron Foundry in 1822).)

=== Lieutenant Colonels ===
The following officers served as Lieutenant-Colonel of the North Devon Militia:

- (1758–1778) George II Buck (1731–1794) of Affeton and Moreton House, Bideford. he was the brother-in-law of Paul II Orchard (1739–1812) of Hartland Abbey, Colonel of the regiment from 1779. He resigned in 1778.
- (30 August 1778 – 1779) Redmond Kelly. Transferred to 1st Devon Militia.
- (28 January 1779 – 1793) Francis Bassett (c.1740-1802) of Heanton Court, Heanton Punchardon. He had been a captain in 1763. Resigned 1793. Master of the Devon and Somerset Staghounds.
- (9 December 1793 – 1794) Sir Thomas Dyke Acland, 9th Baronet (1752–1794), of Killerton. He had been Captain, 4 August 1787 & Major 13 August 1790). Died in office. He also succeeded Col Basset as Master of the Devon and Somerset Staghounds, who had succeeded his father the 7th Baronet in that office.
- (25 November 1799 – 1821) Charles II Hayne (1747–1821) of Fuge House, Blackawton, formerly of Lupton House, Brixham, High Sheriff of Devon in 1772. He had been Captain 18 February 1794, Major 17 February 1795. Died in office. His father Charles I Hayne (d.1769), of Lupton and Fuge, Sheriff of Devon, had been Colonel of the 4th Devon Militia.
- (27 November 1821-?) William Bruton. He had been Captain 29 September 1792, Major 8 August 1815.
- Col Augustus II Saltren-Willett (1781–1849), of Tapeley. He had fought at the Battle of Waterloo in 1815 in the 6th (Inniskilling) Dragoons.
- (30 July 1846 – 1853) Sir George Stucley Buck Stucley, 1st Baronet (1812–1900) (known as George Buck until 1858), of Affeton, Moreton House, Bideford and Hartland Abbey. Formerly of the Royal Horse Guards, he was appointed Lt-Col of the North Devon Militia on 30 July 1849 and continued as Lt-Col Commandant with the Devon Artillery Militia.

Under the 1852 Militia Act the rank of colonel was abolished in the militia and the lieutenant-colonel became the commanding officer; at the same time, the position of Honorary Colonel was introduced. Lieutenant-Colonels Commandant of the Devon Artillery Militia included the following:

- Sir George Stucley (see above) from reorganisation. He was appointed Honorary Colonel of the unit on 1 January 1873.
- Richard Bury Russell, formerly lieutenant in the 2nd Foot, commissioned as captain on the formation of the Devon Artillery Militia 30 June 1853, promoted to major 29 June 1859, promoted to Lt-Col and took over command on 6 January 1870.
- William Jones, originally commissioned into the Devon Artillery Militia as a lieutenant on 23 March 1871, took over as Lt-Col on 8 February 1882.
- Lt-Col William Lowther, a retired Regular officer, became CO on 5 May 1894.
- Lt-Col Owen White, commissioned as captain on 20 May 1885 and major on 29 April 1894, was promoted to the command on 4 May 1904.

=== Honorary Colonels ===
The following served as Honorary Colonel of the unit:

- Sir George Stucley (see above) from 1 January 1873 until his death in 1900
- General Sir Richard Harrison, GCB, CMG, Colonel-Commandant, Royal Engineers, appointed 25 October 1906 (Hon Col, Devonshire Fortress Royal Engineers, after the disbandment of the Devonshire Artillery Militia).

=== Other personalities ===
- Capt Charles Henry Webber (1810–1883) of Buckland House, Braunton, JP for Devon, and also Lieutenant in the Royal North Devon Yeomanry.
- Brevet Lt-Col George Dare Dowell, who had won a Victoria Cross as a lieutenant in the Royal Marine Artillery during the Crimean War, served as permanent adjutant of the Devon Artillery Militia from 1870 until the 1890s.

== Uniforms and insignia ==
The first pairs of Colours issued to the Devonshire Militia battalions in 1758 consisted of the Union flag for the King's Colour, and one bearing the Duke of Bedford's coat of arms for the Regimental Colour.

The uniform of the 2nd or North Devon Militia in 1778 was red with green facings; in 1800 it was red with yellow facings. The badge on the officers' buttons and belt-plates about 1800 was a crowned badge of the Order of the Garter, but within the garter St George's Cross was combined with that of St Andrew (thereby forming the flag of Great Britain 1707–1801); the garter bore the title 'North Devon'. By 1812 the outmoded flag was replaced by a crown within the garter, which now carried the title '2d Devonshire Regiment'. When the regiment was converted to artillery in 1853 it adopted the RA's blue uniform with red facings.

== See also ==
- Militia (Great Britain)
- Militia (United Kingdom)
- Devon Militia
- South Devon Militia
- East Devon Militia
- Royal North Devon Yeomanry
- Militia Artillery units of the United Kingdom and Colonies
