= East Devon Militia =

Auxiliary unit of the British Army

East Devon Militia 1st Devon Militia 4th (1st Devon Militia) Battalion, Devonshire Regiment 3rd (Reserve) Battalion, Devonshire Regiment
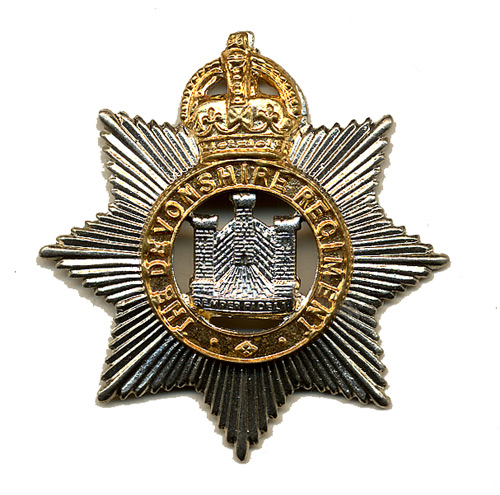
- Badge of the East Devon Militia, later adopted as the cap badge of the Devonshire Regiment
- Active: 5 December 1758–1 April 1953
- Country: Kingdom of Great Britain (1758–1800); United Kingdom (1801–1953)
- Branch: Militia
- Role: Infantry
- Garrison/HQ: Exeter Castle; Topsham Barracks, Exeter
- Motto: Semper Fidelis (Ever faithful)

Commanders
- Notable commanders: John Dyke Acland; John Pollexfen Bastard

The 1st or East Devon Militia, later the 3rd Battalion, Devonshire Regiment, was a part-time military unit in the maritime county of Devonshire in the West of England. The Militia had always been important in the county, which was vulnerable to invasion, and from its formal creation in 1758 the regiment served in home defence in all of Britain's major wars until 1908, after which it became a reserve unit for the Devonshire Regiment.

== Background ==
The universal obligation to military service in the Shire levy was long established in England and its legal basis was updated by two acts of 1557 (4 & 5 Ph. & M. cc. 2 and 3), which placed selected men, the 'trained bands', under the command of Lords Lieutenant appointed by the monarch. This is seen as the starting date for the organised county militia in England. The Devon Trained Bands were divided into three 'Divisions' (East, North and South), which were called out in the Armada year of 1588.

Although control of the militia was one of the areas of dispute between King Charles I and Parliament that led to the First English Civil War, most of the county Trained Bands played little part in the fighting. After the Restoration of the monarchy in 1660 the militia of Devon were called out on a number of occasions when the appearance of hostile fleets caused alarm, and in 1685 they prevented the rebel Duke of Monmouth from accessing recruits and supplies from Devon and Cornwall. After the Battle of Sedgemoor the Devon Militia were active in rounding up rebels.

The Devonshire Militia continued to be mustered for training during the reign of William III, the six 'county' regiments together with the Exeter and Plymouth regiments and several Troops of Horse, mustering 6163 men. But after the Treaty of Utrecht in 1713 the militia was allowed to dwindle.

== East Devon Militia ==
=== Seven Years War ===
Under threat of French invasion during the Seven Years' War a series of Militia Acts from 1757 re-established county militia regiments, the men being conscripted by means of parish ballots (paid substitutes were permitted) to serve for three years. Front-line Devonshire was initially given a quota of 1600 men to raise. There was a property qualification for officers, who were commissioned by the Lord Lieutenant. The first issue of arms to the Devon Militia was made on 5 December 1758, and they were embodied for permanent service on 23 June 1759. Two, later four (Exeter, North, East and South), battalions were formed in Devon under the command of the Duke of Bedford as Lord Lieutenant. They served in the West Country for the whole of their service; the duties included guarding French prisoners of war. In December 1762 the battalions were stood down ('disembodied') and the following year were reorganised into three peacetime regiments. The Exeter and East battalions combined to form a single regiment, the 1st or East Devon Militia, of 600 men, 30 Sergeants and 20 Drummers, organised into 10 companies, with its headquarters (HQ) at Exeter and the Duke of Bedford as its Colonel. Sir John Prideaux, 6th Baronet, Colonel of the disbanded East Devon battalion, took legal action against the Duke of Bedford and the Deputy lieutenants for the loss of his command, and refused to give up the battalion's arms and accoutrements in his care until 1764.

=== War of American Independence ===
The militiamen's peacetime training was widely neglected, but the Devonshire regiments do appear to have completed their training each year. The Duke of Bedford died in 1771, and Lieutenant-Colonel Sir Richard Bampfylde, 4th Baronet, MP, resigned, so the new Lord Lieutenant, Earl Poulett, recommended the son of a local landowner, Major John Dyke Acland, 20th Foot, for the colonelcy. After the outbreak of the War of American Independence in 1775 Lord North's government introduced a Bill in Parliament to 'Enable His Majesty to call out and assemble the Militia in all cases of Rebellion in any part of the Dominion belonging to the Crown of Great Britain'. Colonel Acland (himself MP for Callington) presented an Address to the King on behalf of the East Devon Militia in support of the Bill, which was vehemently condemned by the Bill's opponents including Edmund Burke and Charles James Fox; the Bill was passed in December 1775.

In 1776–7 Col Acland served in his Regular Army rank of major in the Saratoga campaign under his friend and fellow MP Maj-Gen John Burgoyne. Acland commanded the Grenadier battalion and was severely wounded and captured. He was well-treated by his captors, and after his return to England was challenged to a duel by an officer who resented his favourable comments on the Americans. Although Acland survived the duel, he is believed to have died from the effects of a chill caught on the day.

The militia was called out when Britain was threatened with invasion by the Americans' allies, France and Spain, and the regiment was embodied at Exeter on 20 April 1778. Earl Poulett appointed his eldest son, Viscount Hinton, to succeed Acland as colonel of the East Devons, and soothed the lieutenant-colonel, Paul Orchard, by promoting him to take over the North Devons, which were in disorder. The East Devons remained at Exeter until November, when the companies were distributed to winter quarters in Somerset, at Wells, Glastonbury and Shepton Mallet. During the summer of 1779 the East Devon Militia was at Coxheath Camp near Maidstone in Kent, which was the army's largest training camp, where the Militia were exercised as part of a division alongside Regular troops while providing a reserve in case of French invasion of South East England. The East Devons were brigaded with the East Suffolk Militia and Monmouth Militia. Each battalion had two small field-pieces or 'battalion guns' attached to it, manned by men of the regiment instructed by a Royal Artillery sergeant and two gunners. In November the regiment was widely dispersed to winter quarters in Surrey, with HQ at Kingston upon Thames. Two extra companies of volunteers were now attached to the regiment and served with it for the rest of the period of embodiment.

For the summer of 1780 the regiment was camped with the 6th Foot at Playden Heights in Sussex. It returned to Somerset for its winter quarters, where the men who had completed their tree-year term of service were allowed home furlough, in the hope that they would make bargains to serve as substitutes for the next batch of men chosen by ballot, and then return to the regiment as trained men. However, the ranks were full of recruits that summer. The summers of 1781 and 1782 were spent in Devon at Roborough Camp and the Maker Redoubts near Plymouth, where both Regulars and Militia (including all three Devon regiments) were gathered. The Light Companies of the regiments at Roborough were formed into a composite Light Battalion, which trained separately. The Militia also had to find guards for the American prisoners of war lodged in Mill Prison. The camp at Roborough was broken up on 10 November 1782 and the regiments went into winter quarters. The East Devons were quartered at Bristol, where they had to find the guards for American prisoners confined in Stapleton Prison. American independence was recognised in November 1782, and peace was settled with France and Spain early in 1783, so the militia could be stood down. The East Devons marched to Exeter and were disembodied there on 24 March.

=== French Revolutionary War ===
From 1787 to 1793 the East Devon Militia was assembled for its annual 28 days' training, but to save money only two-thirds of the men were mustered each year. In view of the worsening international situation the whole Devonshire Militia was embodied for service on 22 December 1792, even though Revolutionary France did not declare war on Britain until 1 February 1793. In February the regiment sent a detachment to Plymouth to be trained to operate battalion guns, and the rest marched to Surrey, moving in July to Dover, where seven companies were stationed in Dover Castle, two in the town, and one at Archcliffe Fort. In April 1794 the regiment marched to Salisbury and then on to Bristol, where the principal duty once more was guarding French prisoners in Stapleton Prison. The following year the regiment spent the summer in camp at Roborough. The winter of 1795–6 was spent in barracks at Plymouth Dock, guarding the Mill Prison, which posting continued during 1796 apart from autumn manoeuvres at Roborough. In March 1798 the standing militia regiments were reinforced by men from the newly-raised Supplementary Militia, the remainder forming new regiments (such as the 4th Devon Militia formed at Exeter). In October the 1st Devons left Plymouth for winter quarters at Berry Head, Totnes, Dartmouth and surrounding villages, and remained in these quarters throughout 1799. In November that year the Militia was partially disembodied, some of the men being stood down with the whole of the Supplementary Militia; 70 of the men turned out of the 1st Devon enlisted in the Regular Army (which was part of the motivation for the change). In February 1800 the regiment returned to Plymouth Dock barracks and was concentrated for the first time in 18 months. The duties as usual were to guard the dockyard and the French prisoners, and also riot duty. Bread riots and looting broke out in Plymouth on 31 March 1801 and the magistrates were unable to restore order with the detachments of militia available. Colonel Bastard of the 1st Devon returned on 4 April and took matters in hand, seizing firearms in the docks to prevent them falling into the hands of the rioters (who had been joined by striking dockyard hands) and calling out the Volunteers to back up his own detachments. It was several months before disturbances in the West Country were put down: the regiment remained on standby to march at short notice, all leave was cancelled, and the men who had been disembodied were recalled to the colours. However, a peace treaty having been agreed (the Treaty of Amiens), the Militia were disembodied in early 1802. The 1st Devon marched from Plymouth Dock on 7 April, arriving at Exeter on 12 April, to be disembodied on 20 April.

=== Napoleonic Wars ===
The Peace of Amiens did not last long, and the Militia were soon called out again. The warrant to embody the Devon and Exeter Militia was sent to the Lord Lieutenant (Earl Fortescue) on 11 March 1803, and the 1st Devon of eight companies was practically complete by 5 April, with its HQ at Exeter Castle. On 21 May the regiment was ordered to march to Plymouth Dock, where it arrived on 26 May, the garrison including all three Devon Militia regiments. The duties once again included guarding French prisoners in Mill Prison. In June the Supplementary Militia was also embodied, and the 1st Devon Militia was increased to 10 companies (860 all ranks). The Plymouth garrison trained on Buckland Down, with particular emphasis on the Light Companies, and six chosen men from each of the other companies trained as marksmen alongside the Light Companies. In August the 1st Devons camped at Wembury a few miles from Plymouth, where they helped to build a redoubt at the mouth of the River Yealm. On 16 November the camp was broken up and the regiment dispersed to winter quarters: two companies to Dartmouth, four to Kingsbridge and Modbury, two to the Yealm redoubt (now used as a penal establishment) and the two flank companies on detached duty; the companies were regularly rotated between these stations. Combined drill with the Volunteers and Yeomanry was instituted. On 10 June 1803 part of the detachment at Yealm battery rowed out in boats to help recover a collier that had been attacked by a French Privateer. The regiment was concentrated for training in the summer of 1803, then went to Mill Bay Barracks for the following winter, with the exception of detachments at Yealm battery, Berry Head, and manning warning beacons. As usual the duty included guarding prisoners, while craftsmen in the ranks were employed on government works.

In 1805 there was a drive to induce militiamen to volunteer for the Regular Army (or the Royal Marines, in the case of men from Devon and Cornwall). The number of men 'allowed' to volunteer (ie the target) was set at 222 for the 1st Devons, but not more than 100 accepted, and the regiment was reduced to 8 companies once more. That summer when Napoleon was massing his 'Army of England' at Boulogne for a projected invasion, the regiment was still part of the Plymouth garrison. Its 664 men under Lt-Col Edmund Bastard were deployed with 8 companies in Plymouth Dock Barracks and a detachment at Yealm Redoubt. In October the regiment marched from Plymouth to Portsmouth, where it was quartered in Portsea Barracks, brigaded with the North Devon and North Hampshire Militia. In April 1806 it moved to Lewes in Sussex, where it formed part of the Brighton brigade, and then in July to Eastbourne where the men assisted in the construction of Martello towers. In November the regiment returned to Exeter for its winter quarters. In the summer of 1807 it was back at Plymouth Dock. Another recruitment drive for men to transfer to the Line regiments was accompanied by balloting to bring the Militia up to strength: the 1st Devon required 335 men in December to replace volunteers and time-expired men. Again in 1810, the Militia were increased by half their establishment, and recruits were obtained 'by beat of drum' (as in regiments of the Line) as well as by the ballot and by volunteers from the Local Militia, which had replaced the Volunteer Corps.

The 1st Devon spent much of 1809 in the unpopular duty of guarding the Prison ships in Plymouth Harbour. In May 1810 it marched to Kingston upon Thames and from there to Hythe, Kent, where it guarded the Royal Military Canal. In November it moved to winter quarters in Chelmsford, Essex, where duties were light, though they included marching parties of prisoners of war to the great camp at Norman Cross. The summer of 1811 was spent at Winchester, the march beginning at the end of June. In 1812 there was an outbreak of Luddite machine-breaking and the regiment spent much of the year constantly on the move round the industrial Midlands. Having concentrated at Winchester it moved in April to Warwick, then to Derby, Burton upon Trent, Loughborough and Lichfield, with detached companies going to other towns. The winter was spent at Lichfield and Tamworth, Staffordshire, before returning to Plymouth Dock in 1813.

Efforts were made to extend the service of the Militia. In 1811 bounties were offered for service in Ireland, and the 1st Devon formed a company of 69 volunteers. But in 1814 only one man and three officers volunteered for garrison duty in Europe. In December 1813 the regiment was marched from Plymouth to Bristol, where it took up duties at Stapleton Prison once more. It returned to Plymouth in May 1814, but by now the war was over, the Treaty of Fontainebleau having been signed in April. Plymouth was busy with militia regiments returning from Ireland to be disembodied, and returning British prisoners of war. On 16 June the warrant for disembodying the Devonshire Militia was signed and the regiment returned to Exeter to complete the process by 9 August.

=== Ireland ===
Napoleon's escape from Elba and return to power in France in 1815 meant that the Militia had to be called out once more. The regiments began recruiting for volunteers 'by beat of drum' from 25 April and the warrant for embodying the Devonshire Militia was issued on 16 June, with the 1st Devon to be embodied at Exeter on 24 July. By then the decisive Battle of Waterloo had already been fought, but the process of embodiment went on while the Regulars were away in the Army of Occupation in France. However, in the absence of a fresh ballot only a small number of men whose time was not yet expired were available: the regiment mustered 25 sergeants, 17 drummers and 130 rank and file. Together with the few recruits who had been obtained, they marched to Plymouth on 7 August, leaving a recruiting party at Exeter. On 27 October the regiment embarked aboard the Seringapatam transport for service in Ireland. One sergeant, three drummers and 11 privates refused to serve in Ireland and were attached to the Derby Militia at Plymouth. The regiment disembarked at Cobh on 5 November and marched to Cork Barracks. It then moved to Fermoy Barracks on 8 November, sending a number of detachments to outlying posts. The regiment remained at Fermoy until 16 April 1816, when it returned to Cork, re-embarked on the Seringapatam and reached Plymouth on 20 April. It was disembodied on 1 May.

=== Long Peace ===
The Militia Act 1817 allowed the annual training of the Militia to be dispensed with. So although officers continued to be commissioned into the regiment and the ballot was regularly held, the selected men were rarely mustered for drill. The regiment assembled 450 strong for 28 days' drill in 1820, and for 21 days the following year. Training was held again in 1825 at Exeter, when rewards were offered for 31 men who had failed to appear and were listed as deserters. Training was held in 1831, but not again before 1852, and the ballot lapsed. The permanent staff of the regiment in 1819 consisted of the adjutant, paymaster and surgeon, sergeant-major and drum-major, and one sergeant and corporal for every 40 men (12 of each) and one drummer for every two companies plus the flank companies (6), but these were progressively reduced so that by 1835 there were only the adjutant, sergeant-major and six sergeants, while the other long-serving men were pensioned off. In 1834 the permanent staff had been under arms during trade union disturbances in Exeter, but an inspecting officer found nine of them unfit due to age or infirmity. Again in 1847 the permanent staff and pensioners were called out to assist special constables to put down food riots in Exeter.

== 1st Devon Militia ==
The Militia of the United Kingdom was reformed by the Militia Act 1852, enacted during a period of international tension. As before, units were raised and administered on a county basis, and filled by voluntary enlistment (although conscription by means of the Militia Ballot might be used if the counties failed to meet their quotas). Training was for 56 days on enlistment, then for 21–28 days per year, during which the men received full army pay. The permanent staff was increased. Under the act, Militia units could be embodied by royal proclamation for full-time home defence service in three circumstances:

1. 'Whenever a state of war exists between Her Majesty and any foreign power'.
2. 'In all cases of invasion or upon imminent danger thereof'.
3. 'In all cases of rebellion or insurrection'.

Under the Militia Act 1852, the militia establishment for Devon was fixed at two regiments of infantry and one of artillery. The North Devon Militia were converted to artillery in 1853 and the surplus men and equipment taken over by the 1st Devon. The 1st Devon now dropped the 'East Devon' title. The reorganised regiment assembled at the Artillery Barracks in Exeter for 21 days' training on 26 October 1852, with the assistance of drill sergeants borrowed from Regular regiments. Training was also held in 1853 and 1854.

=== Crimean War ===
War having broken out with Russia in 1854 and an expeditionary force sent to the Crimea, the Militia were called out for home defence. The 1st Devon Militia was embodied on 18 December, consisting of 10 companies, 942 all ranks. The medically unfit men, together with married men with two or more children, were sent home and volunteers enlisted to replace them. The regiment was drilled into shape, and on 27 February 1855 went by rail to Bristol, where it boarded steamers for Newport, Wales. Here a problem arose: by one interpretation of the regulations none of the men enlisted before 12 May 1854 could be forced to do more than 56 days' service. Most of these had already been sent home in December, but there were still 117 serving in the regiment who refused to re-enlist under the later regulations, so the regiment lost many of its best men (the family men were also discharged). However, recruitment had been good, so most of the losses were made up. Two recruiting drives during the year for militiamen to transfer to the Regulars saw the loss of another 141 men from the regiment. On 21 December the regiment marched to Pontypool, where it boarded trains for Liverpool and embarked for Ireland, where it was stationed at Castle Barracks in Limerick. During the winter another 401 men volunteered for the Regulars, which severely reduced the strength of the regiment. The war having ended, the regiment left Limerick for Cork on 5 June 1856, and on 11 June embarked on the Germania steamer bound for Weymouth, Dorset. The ship was caught in fog while passing Land's End and was nearly lost on the rocks. Once it had landed at Weymouth it relieved an Irish militia regiment guarding Portland Harbour. After the presentation of new regimental colours to the regiment it marched to Exeter on 18 July, arriving on 23 July. The order to disembody arrived the next day, and the process was concluded on 31 July.

=== Mid-Victorian era ===
The 1st Devon Militia carried out its first peacetime training (21 days) in September 1858, and underwent 21 or 27 days in each of the following years, the non-commissioned officers and recruits having undergone preliminary drill over the preceding 14 or 21 days. In November 1867 the permanent staff were called out to help deal with bread riots in Exeter, several times charging at the rioters with bayonets to disperse them. During the Fenian scare in 1867 the regiment posted guards over the military stores at Exeter. That year the Militia Reserve Act came into force, whereby in exchange for a bounty the militiamen could sign up for service with the Regulars in time of war; however, there was little take-up among the 1st Devons. (Note: The Militia Reserve was called out in the summer of 1878 during the international crisis preceding the Congress of Berlin. Of the 1st Devons, 221 men were called up to be attached to the 1st Battalion 11th Foot at Devonport, of whom 214 joined by the deadline of 19 April. The remainder subsequently joined having satisfactorily accounted for their absence; the last man to arrive had been shipwrecked. The Militia Reserve was stood down on 31 July.) In 1871 the Militia were permitted to camp for their annual training, but the 1st Devons' camp at Woodbury was cancelled after there was a case of Smallpox in the village. In 1872 it carried out its first camp since 1813, and the following year took part in division-scale manoeuvres at Roborough Down. However, the unpopularity of camps led to a falling-off in recruitment and the Devon Militia regiments were each reduced by two companies in 1876.

Under the 'Localisation of the Forces' scheme introduced by the Cardwell Reforms of 1872, Militia regiments were grouped into county brigades with their local Regular and Volunteer Force battalions. For the 1st Devon Regiment this was Brigade No 34 (County of Devon) in Western District alongside the 11th Foot, the South Devon Militia and the Exeter and South Devon Volunteers. (Note: On 5–6 November 1879 the permanent staff of the 1st Devons were called out with the men at 34th Brigade Depot to put down riots in the Cathedral Yard at Exeter.) The Militia were now controlled by the War Office rather than their county Lord Lieutenant, and officers' commissions were signed by the Queen. A mobilisation scheme began to appear in the Army List from December 1875. This assigned to Militia units places in an order of battle serving with Regular units in an 'Active Army' and a 'Garrison Army'. The 1st and South Devon Militia were both assigned to the Garrison Army in the Plymouth defences.

== Devonshire Regiment ==
The Childers Reforms of 1881 took Cardwell's reforms further, and the Militia regiments became integral parts of their Regular county regiment, with the 11th Foot becoming the Devonshire Regiment of two battalions and the two Devon Militia regiments becoming the 3rd and 4th battalions. This caused some confusion: because there had been no established order of precedence, when Militia regiments were brigaded together they had traditionally drawn lots for precedence in that year's camp; this became an annual ballot between the counties. Then in 1833 individual regiments were balloted for a permanent order of precedence and this list was continued in 1855: the 1st Devons were drawn as No 41, the South Devons as No 25. Normally this only affected matters such as positions on the parade ground, but when the militia became numbered battalions it meant that the South Devons (originally the 3rd, later 2nd) became the 3rd Battalion, Devonshire Regiment by virtue of their higher precedence, and the 1st Devons became the 4th Battalion (1st Devon Militia), Devonshire Regiment. However, the Devonshire Regiment did adopt the old East Devon Militia's cap badge and motto in 1883.

The battalion continued to do its annual training and target practice, being issued with the Martini–Henry rifle in 1882. Like many Militia battalions, the 4th Devons volunteered for garrison service during the Anglo-Egyptian War of 1882, but none were embodied. The Regular Reserves were called up when an international crisis arose in 1885 over the Panjdeh incident while much of the Regular Army was simultaneously engaged on the Nile Expedition; the acting CO offered the 4th Battalion for garrison duty, but this was politely declined. The Devonshire Militia battalions were further reduced in 1890, to an establishment of six companies.

=== Second Boer War ===
With the bulk of the Regular Army serving in South Africa during the Second Boer War, the Militia were called out. The 4th Battalion was embodied from 11 May 1900 to 16 July 1901, serving in the garrison of the Channel Isles.

A number of officers who served in the battalion in subsequent years had seen active service in the Boer War, including the CO, Lt-Col the Hon E. A. Palk, and Capt William Edwards, who had won a Distinguished Service Order (DSO) in the Ashanti War before serving with the South African Constabulary.

== Special Reserve ==
After the Boer War, the future of the Militia was called into question. There were moves to reform the Auxiliary Forces (Militia, Yeomanry and Volunteers) to take their place in the six Army Corps proposed by St John Brodrick as Secretary of State for War. However, little of Brodrick's scheme was carried out. Under the sweeping Haldane Reforms of 1908, the Militia was replaced by the Special Reserve (SR), a semi-professional force whose role was to provide reinforcement drafts for Regular units serving overseas in wartime (similar to the Militia Reserve of 1867).

Under these changes, the 3rd (2nd Devon Militia) Battalion was disbanded, and the 4th (1st Devon Militia) became the 3rd (Reserve) Battalion, Devonshire Regiment on 1 April 1908. The reformed battalion also had a cadet company at Dartmouth.

=== 3rd (Reserve) Battalion ===
When World War I broke out on 4 August 1914 the battalion was embodied at Exeter and moved to its war station at Plymouth on 8 August. It returned to Exeter on 28 August to fulfil its role of organising drafts of Special Reservists and returning Regular reservists for the 1st Battalion serving with the British Expeditionary Force. The battalion was soon overwhelmed by returning reservists and recruits flocking to enlist, and by the end of September 1914 it was three times its establishment strength. In May 1915 it moved to Devonport where it formed part of the Plymouth Garrison for the rest of the war, but its primary role was to train reinforcement drafts for the battalions serving overseas. In the course of the war the 3rd Devons trained and despatched 750 officers and over 13,000 other ranks. After the war, the battalion moved to Rugeley Camp in 1919. The remaining personnel were drafted to the 1st Battalion on 1 August 1919 and the 3rd Battalion was disembodied on 9 August.

=== 11th (Reserve) Battalion ===
After Lord Kitchener issued his call for volunteers in August 1914, the battalions of the 1st, 2nd and 3rd New Armies ('K1', 'K2' and 'K3' of 'Kitchener's Army') were quickly formed at the regimental depots. The SR battalions also swelled with new recruits and were soon well above their establishment strength. On 8 October 1914 each SR battalion was ordered to use the surplus to form a service battalion of the 4th New Army ('K4'). Accordingly, the 3rd (Reserve) Bn at Exeter formed the 11th (Service) Bn Devonshire Regiment in November. It was to be part of 100th Brigade in 33rd Division. In December 1914 it went into billets at Torquay. In April 1915 the War Office decided to convert the K4 battalions into 2nd Reserve units, providing drafts for the K1–K3 battalions in the same way that the SR was doing for the Regular battalions. The Devon battalion became 11th (Reserve) Battalion (Note: Not to be confused with 11th Battalion Devons formed during World War II (see List of battalions of the Devonshire Regiment)), at Wareham, Dorset, in 10th Reserve Brigade, where it trained drafts for the 8th, 9th and 10th (Service) Bns Devons. On 1 September 1916 the 2nd Reserve battalions were transferred to the Training Reserve (TR) and the battalion was redesignated 44th Training Reserve Bn, still in 10th Reserve Bde. The training staff retained their Devons badges. The battalion was finally disbanded on 16 February 1918 at Perham Down Camp on Salisbury Plain.

=== Postwar ===
Although the Supplementary Reserve (renamed Militia again in 1921) remained in existence after 1919 and a small number of officers were commissioned, the infantry militia dwindled away: by the outbreak of World War II 3rd Bn Devonshires had no officers listed. The Militia was formally disbanded in April 1953.

== Commanders ==
=== Colonels ===
The following served as Colonel of the Regiment from its re-establishment in 1758:

- John, 4th Duke of Bedford, assumed command 1758, died 1771
- John Dyke Acland, commissioned 1771, died 1778
- John, 4th Earl Poulett, commissioned 22 January 1779, resigned 1798
- John Pollexfen Bastard, promoted 8 November 1798, died 1816
- Hugh, 2nd Earl Fortescue, commissioned 20 May 1816, resigned 1855

Under the 1852 Militia Act the rank of colonel was abolished in the militia and the lieutenant-colonel became the commanding officer; at the same time, the position of Honorary Colonel was introduced.

=== Lieutenant-Colonels ===
Lieutenant-Colonels Commandant of the unit included the following:

- Hon John William Fortescue, MP, second son of 2nd Earl Fortescue, promoted 30 September 1853, resigned 1856
- Francis Edward Drewe, half-pay major, 23rd Foot, appointed 12 July 1856, resigned 1858 on returning to full pay; later major-general
- John Davie Ferguson Davie, MP, retired captain, Grenadier Guards, appointed 1 November 1858, resigned 1867
- R.T. White-Thomson, CB, retired major, 1st Kings Dragoon Guards, appointed 10 April 1867, resigned 1893
- Henry Walrond, promoted 27 May 1893
- Hon John Schomberg Trefusis, younger son of Charles, 19th Lord Clinton, promoted 3 November 1897
- Hon Edward Arthur Palk, younger son of Lawrence Palk, 1st Baron Haldon, promoted 23 April 1902
- J. Stafford Goldie Harding, retired captain, promoted 10 January 1906
- Dennis Fortescue Boles, MP, promoted 2 April 1910, until 31 January 1917
- Reginald Francis W. Hill, promoted 1 January 1917

=== Honorary Colonels ===
The following served as Honorary Colonel of the unit:

- Hugh, 2nd Earl Fortescue, from 1855
  No other Hon Colonel was named until the formation of the Supplementary Reserve when the Hon Colonel of the disbanded 3rd (2nd Devon Militia) Bn, Col F.H. Mountsteven, CMG was appointed.

== Uniforms and insignia ==
The first pairs of Colours issued to the Devonshire Militia battalions in 1758 consisted of the Union flag for the King's Colour, and one bearing the Duke of Bedford's coat of arms for the Regimental Colour. The regimental badge of the 1st or East Devon Militia from the date of its formation was a heraldic castle (representing Exeter Castle) with the motto Semper fidelis (Ever faithful), allegedly to commemorate the defence of the city by the Trained Bands during the English Civil War. This badge was officially authorised by the Lord Lieutenant in 1860, and was adopted by the whole Devonshire Regiment in 1883.

The uniform of the 1st or East Devon Militia in 1778 was red with yellow facings; some time between 1800 and 1803 the facings were changed to white, but in 1816 they charged back to yellow. When the Devonshires reverted to their pre-1881 Lincoln green facings in the early 1900s the militia battalions conformed.

== See also ==
- Militia (English)
- Militia (Great Britain)
- Militia (United Kingdom)
- Special Reserve
- Devon Trained Bands
- Devon Militia
- North Devon Militia
- South Devon Militia
- Devon Artillery Militia
