= South Devon Militia =

Auxiliary unit of the British Army

South Devon Militia 2nd Devon Militia 3rd (2nd Devon Militia) Battalion, Devonshire Regiment
- Active: 5 December 1758–15 July 1908
- Country: Kingdom of Great Britain (1758–1800); United Kingdom (1801–1908)
- Branch: Militia
- Role: Infantry
- Garrison/HQ: Plymouth

Commanders
- Notable commanders: John Rolle, 1st Baron Rolle

The South Devon Militia was a part-time military unit in the maritime county of Devonshire in the West of England. The Militia had always been important in the county, which was vulnerable to invasion, and from its formal creation in 1758 the regiment served in home defence in all of Britain's major wars, later as a reserve battalion for the Devonshire Regiment. It was disbanded in 1908.

== Background ==
The universal obligation to military service in the Shire levy was long established in England and its legal basis was updated by two acts of 1557 (4 & 5 Ph. & M. cc. 2 and 3), which placed selected men, the 'trained bands', under the command of Lords Lieutenant appointed by the monarch. This is seen as the starting date for the organised county militia in England. The Devon Trained Bands were divided into three 'Divisions' (East, North and South), which were called out in the Armada year of 1588.

Although control of the militia was one of the areas of dispute between King Charles I and Parliament that led to the First English Civil War, most of the county Trained Bands played little part in the fighting. After the Restoration of the monarchy in 1660 the militia of Devon were called out on a number of occasions when the appearance of hostile fleets caused alarm, and in 1685 they prevented the rebel Duke of Monmouth from accessing recruits and supplies from Devon and Cornwall. After the Battle of Sedgemoor the Devon Militia were active in rounding up rebels.

The Devonshire Militia continued to be mustered for training during the reign of William III, the six 'county' regiments together with the Exeter and Plymouth regiments and several Troops of Horse, mustering 6163 men. But after the Treaty of Utrecht in 1713 the militia was allowed to dwindle.

== South Devon Militia ==
=== Seven Years War ===
Under threat of French invasion during the Seven Years' War a series of Militia Acts from 1757 re-established county militia regiments, the men being conscripted by means of parish ballots (paid substitutes were permitted) to serve for three years. Front-line Devonshire was given a quota of 1600 men to raise. There was a property qualification for officers, who were commissioned by the Lord Lieutenant. The size of the militia was increased as the war continued. The first issue of arms to the Devon Militia was made on 5 December 1758, and they were embodied for permanent service on 23 June 1759. Two, later four (Exeter, North, East and South), battalions were formed in Devon under the command of the Duke of Bedford as Lord Lieutenant. They served in the West Country for the whole of their service; the duties included guarding French prisoners of war. In December 1762 the battalions were stood down ('disembodied') and the following year were reorganised into three peacetime regiments: the 1st or East, 2nd or North and 3rd or South Devon Militia. The South Regiment consisted of 500 men organised in eight companies commanded by Colonel Sir John Rogers, 3rd Baronet, who had raised the regiment in 1758.

=== War of American Independence ===
The militiamen's peacetime training was widely neglected, but the Devonshire regiments do appear to have completed their training each year. After the outbreak of the War of American Independence in 1775 Lord North's government introduced a Bill in Parliament to 'Enable His Majesty to call out and assemble the Militia in all cases of Rebellion in any part of the Dominion belonging to the Crown of Great Britain'; the Bill was passed in December 1775. The militia was called out when Britain was threatened with invasion by the Americans' allies, France and Spain, and the regiment was embodied at Plymouth on 26 March 1778. During the summers the militia went into camp where they were exercised as part of a division alongside Regular Army troops. In 1782 the South Devons were at Roborough near Plymouth where all three Devon regiments were gathered. The South Devon were in 1st Brigade alongside the 75th Foot and the Carmarthen and Worcester Militia regiments. The Light Companies of the regiments at Roborough were formed into a composite Light Battalion, which trained separately. The Militia also had to find guards for the American prisoners of war lodged in Mill Prison. The camp at Roborough was broken up on 10 November 1782 and the regiments went into winter quarters. American independence was recognised in November 1782, and peace was settled with France and Spain early in 1783, so the militia could be stood down. The South Devons were disembodied on 3 March.

=== French Revolutionary War ===
From 1787 to 1793 the South Devon Militia was assembled at Plymouth for its annual 28 days' training, but to save money only two-thirds of the men were mustered each year. In view of the worsening international situation the whole Devonshire Militia was embodied for service on 22 December 1792, even though Revolutionary France did not declare war on Britain until 1 February 1793.

In June 1793 both the South and North Devon regiments marched to join a large militia training encampment at Broadwater Common, Waterdown Forest, outside Tunbridge Wells. The whole camp moved to Ashdown Forest at the beginning of August and then to Brighton for two weeks before returning to Broadwater Common. The camp broke up in the autumn and the regiments went to their separate winter quarters. In the summer of 1795 the South Devons were brigaded with the South Hampshires, 1st Somerset and West Yorks at a camp in Barham Downs outside Canterbury.

The militia were frequently moved around the country but in the winter of 1795–6 all three Devon regiments were at Plymouth guarding the fortifications and the French prisoners of war. In March 1798 the standing militia regiments were reinforced by men from the newly raised Supplementary Militia, the remainder forming new regiments (such as the 4th Devon Militia formed at Exeter).

In August 1798 the Colonel of the South Devons, Lord Rolle, offered his regiment for service in Ireland during the Rebellion of 1798–99, but found his men unwilling to follow him on board ship. He paraded them and asked each man in turn why he would not go, correcting their misconceptions and hearing grievances. His persuasion induced a good number to embark. He suggested to the authorities that the men who stayed behind should be given a spell of really hard duty, but that they should be moved elsewhere before the taunts onf the regular soldiers in their barracks led to a fight.

In 1799 an Act was passed to allow militiamen to transfer to the Regular Army. This caused a dispute between Lord Rolle, who opposed the legislation, and his second-in-command, Lieutenant-Colonel Sir William Elford, Member of Parliament for Plymouth, who had voted for it and had obtained around 50 volunteers from the regiment. In November 1799 the Militia was partially disembodied, two-fifths of the men being stood down together with the whole of the Supplementary Militia. The hope was that the men dismissed from service would enlist in the Regulars. The militia's traditional local defence duties had been taken over by the Volunteers. Although he remained colonel, Lord Rolle was no longer serving with the regiment, and was concerned with raising the Beer and Seaton Volunteers, which he offered to help the 1st Devon Militia in putting down rioting in Plymouth in 1801. The militiamen disembodied in 1799 were called up again.

However, a peace treaty having been agreed (the Treaty of Amiens), the Militia could be stood down, the South Devon being disembodied on 24 April 1802.

=== Napoleonic Wars ===
The Peace of Amiens did not last long, and the Militia were soon called out again. The warrant to embody the Devon and Exeter Militia was sent to the Lord Lieutenant (Earl Fortescue) on 11 March 1803, and the South Devons were duly embodied on 31 March 1803. All three Devon regiments assembled at Plymouth, where they trained alongside the Regulars, with particular emphasis on the Light Companies, and six chosen men from each of the other companies trained as marksmen alongside the Light Companies. Rewards were posted on 1 August 1803 for the apprehension 23 men who had not rejoined the regiment and were listed as deserters, though a number were believed to be serving on naval warships, in the Regular Army or working in London or Newfoundland.

During the summer of 1805, when Napoleon was massing his 'Army of England' at Boulogne for a projected invasion, the South Devons, with 575 men in 10 companies under Lt-Col Sir William Elford, were stationed at Bristol as part of a brigade under Maj-Gen Josiah Champagné.

Once again the militiamen were encouraged to volunteer for the Regular Army (or the Royal Marines, in the case of men from Devon and Cornwall), and by 1805 Lord Rolle was complaining that, his South Devons being the weakest, men should be transferred into it from the other Devon regiments, but this was rejected. An Act to augment the militia was passed in 1807 by which 1134 additional men were to be raised in Devon and distributed to the three regiments. Lord Rolle successfully argued for the three to be made up to equal strength, which meant his regiment receiving men from East Devon, some of whom refused to serve in the South Devons. This led to a long and angry correspondence between the three colonels and the Lord Lieutenant. In 1809 another recruitment drive for men to transfer to the Line regiments was accompanied by balloting to bring the Militia up to strength, and the regiments were allowed to obtain recruits 'by beat of drum' (as in regiments of the Line) and by volunteers from the Local Militia, which had replaced the Volunteer Corps. This led to a resumption of the correspondence between the colonels in 1810, and Lord Rolle and the officers of the South Devons threatened to resign.

In 1812 there was an outbreak of Luddite machine-breaking in the industrial Midlands and the regiment was part of the force employed in suppressing the Luddite Riots, operating in the Nottingham area. It was officially thanked for its service by the commander. In the summer of 1813 the South Devons rejoined the Plymouth garrison, but the regiment was detached in camp on Dartmoor; it moved into the city for winter quarters. By now the war was over, the Treaty of Fontainebleau having been signed in April 1814. Plymouth was busy with militia regiments returning from Ireland to be disembodied, and returning British prisoners of war. On 16 June the warrant for disembodying the Devonshire Militia was signed and the regiment completed the process by 9 August.

=== Waterloo campaign ===
Napoleon's escape from Elba and return to power in France in 1815 meant that the Militia had to be called out once more. The regiments began recruiting for volunteers 'by beat of drum' from 25 April and the warrant for embodying the Devonshire Militia was issued on 16 June, with the South Devon to be embodied at Plymouth on 17 July. By then the decisive Battle of Waterloo had already been fought, but the process of embodiment went on while the Regulars were away in the Army of Occupation in France. The South Devon Militia was disembodied on 8 February 1816.

=== Long Peace ===
The Militia Act 1817 allowed the annual training of the Militia to be dispensed with. So although officers continued to be commissioned into the regiment and the ballot was regularly held, the selected men were rarely mustered for drill. The regiment assembled at Plymouth for 28 days' drill in 1820, and for 21 days the following year. Training was held again in 1825 at Exeter, when rewards were offered for 31 men who had failed to appear and were listed as deserters. Training was held in 1831, but not again before 1852, and the ballot lapsed. The permanent staff of a militia regiment in 1819 was reduced to the adjutant, paymaster and surgeon, sergeant-major and drum-major, and one sergeant and corporal for every 40 men and one drummer for every two companies plus the flank companies, but these were progressively reduced so that by 1835 there were only the adjutant, sergeant-major and six sergeants, while the other long-serving men were pensioned off. (In 1834 an inspecting officer had found all the sergeants unfit for service).

== 2nd Devon Militia ==
The Militia of the United Kingdom was reformed by the Militia Act 1852, enacted during a period of international tension. As before, units were raised and administered on a county basis, and filled by voluntary enlistment (although conscription by means of the Militia Ballot might be used if the counties failed to meet their quotas). Training was for 56 days on enlistment, then for 21–28 days per year, during which the men received full army pay. The permanent staff was increased. Under the Act, Militia units could be embodied by Royal Proclamation for full-time home defence service in three circumstances:

1. 'Whenever a state of war exists between Her Majesty and any foreign power'.
2. 'In all cases of invasion or upon imminent danger thereof'.
3. 'In all cases of rebellion or insurrection'.

Under the Act, the militia establishment for Devon was fixed at two regiments of infantry and one of artillery. The North Devon Militia were converted to artillery in 1853 and the Plymouth regiment dropped the 'South Devon' title and took their place as the 2nd Devon Militia.

=== Crimean War and Indian Mutiny ===
War having broken out with Russia in 1854 and an expeditionary force sent to the Crimea, the Militia were called out for home defence. The 2nd Devon Militia was embodied from 31 May 1854 to 10 June 1856. Unlike the other Devon units, the regiment was also embodied from 9 November 1857 to 14 May 1858 during the Indian mutiny. Thereafter the militia carried out their annual training regularly.

=== Reforms ===
Under the 'Localisation of the Forces' scheme introduced by the Cardwell Reforms of 1872, Militia regiments were grouped into county brigades with their local Regular and Volunteer Force battalions. For the 2nd Devon Regiment this was Brigade No 34 (County of Devon) in Western District alongside the 11th Foot, the 1st Devon Militia and the Exeter and South Devon Volunteers. The Militia were now controlled by the War Office rather than their county Lord Lieutenant, and officers' commissions were signed by the Queen. A mobilisation scheme began to appear in the Army List from December 1875. This assigned to Militia units places in an order of battle serving with Regular units in an 'Active Army' and a 'Garrison Army'. The 1st and 2nd Devon Militia were both assigned to the Garrison Army in the Plymouth defences.

== Devonshire Regiment ==
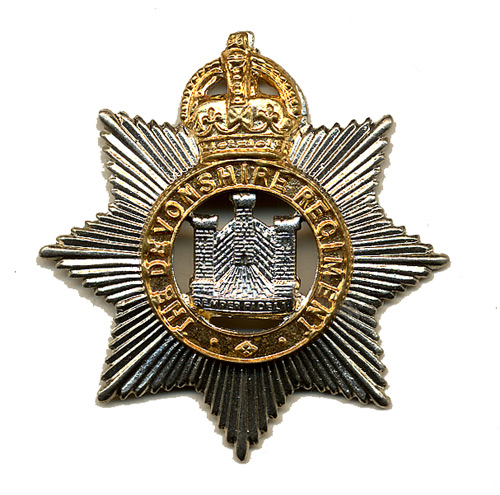
The badge of the Devonshire Regiment, adopted by the whole regiment in 1883.

The Childers Reforms of 1881 took Cardwell's reforms further, and the Militia regiments became integral parts of their Regular county regiment, with the 11th Foot becoming the Devonshire Regiment of two battalions and the two Devon Militia regiments becoming the 3rd and 4th battalions. This caused some confusion: because there had been no established order of precedence, when Militia regiments were brigaded together they had traditionally drawn lots for precedence in that year's camp; this became an annual ballot between the counties. Then in 1833 individual regiments were balloted for a permanent order of precedence and this list was continued in 1855: the East Devons were drawn as No 41, the South Devons as No 25. Normally this only affected matters such as positions on the parade ground, but when the militia became numbered battalions it meant that the former South Devons (now the 2nd) became the 3rd Battalion, (2nd Devon Militia) Devonshire Regiment by virtue of their higher precedence, while the 1st Devons became the 4th Battalion (1st Devon Militia).

Training was now more realistic, often carried out at annual camps, but there was a falling-off in recruitment and the Devon Militia regiments were each reduced by two companies in 1876, and by a further two, to a total of six, in 1890.

=== Second Boer War ===
With the bulk of the Regular Army serving in South Africa during the Second Boer War, the Militia were called out. The 3rd Battalion was embodied from 4 December 1899 to 20 October 1900.

== Disbandment ==
After the Boer War, the future of the Militia was called into question. There were moves to reform the Auxiliary Forces (Militia, Yeomanry and Volunteers) to take their place in the six Army Corps proposed by St John Brodrick as Secretary of State for War. However, little of Brodrick's scheme was carried out. Under the sweeping Haldane Reforms of 1908, the Militia was replaced by the Special Reserve, a semi-professional force whose role was to provide reinforcement drafts for Regular units serving overseas in wartime (similar to the Militia Reserve of 1867).

Under these changes, the 3rd (2nd Devon Militia) Battalion was disbanded on 15 July 1908, and the 4th (1st Devon Militia) became the 3rd (Reserve) Battalion, Devonshire Regiment on 1 April 1908.

== Commanders ==
=== Colonels ===
- Sir John Rogers, 3rd Baronet, raised the regiment in 1758 and resigned in 1765.
- John Rolle, 1st Baron Rolle, the longest-serving colonel, who held the command when the regiment went to Ireland in 1798 and retained it until his death in 1842, despite his disagreements with the Lord Lieutenant and the other militia colonels, and his also being concerned with raising the Beer and Seaton Volunteers and the Royal North Devon Yeomanry.
- Edmund Parker, 2nd Earl of Morley, appointed 8 January 1845, whose father had commanded the North Devon Militia during the Napoleonic Wars.

=== Lieutenant-Colonels ===
The appointment of colonel was abolished in the reorganisation of 1852, and militia regiments were commanded by lieutenant-colonels thereafter:

- John Yarde-Buller, 1st Baron Churston, who had served as lt-col under the Earl of Morley.
- Sir John Henry Seale, 1st Baronet, commissioned 1799, appointed pre-1849.
- The Hon John Buller Yarde-Buller, son of Lord Churston, served under his command and then succeeded him in command; died in 1867.
- John N. Stevenson, appointed 15 July 1867.
- Robert Trood, appointed 26 March 1879.
- Rt Hon Charles Seale-Hayne, MP, retired 10 October 1894
- Francis Mountsteven, formerly captain, Royal Marines, appointed 12 July 1899.
- Richard Moore-Stevens, appointed 26 November 1904.

=== Honorary Colonel ===
The following served as Honorary Colonel of the regiment:

- Rt Hon Charles Seale-Hayne, MP, former CO, appointed 10 October 1894.
- Francis Mountsteven, former CO, continued with the 3rd Bn in the TF

== Uniforms and insignia ==
The uniform of the South Devon Militia in 1778 was red with dark green facings; in 1800 the facings were yellow, and in 1814 they were white. The badge from about 1800 to 1881 was a lion rampant (derived from the coat of arms of the early Earls of Devon) within a garter inscribed with the regimental title. In 1883 the whole of the Devonshire Regiment adopted the castle badge of the former 1st Devon Militia.

== See also ==
- Militia (English)
- Militia (Great Britain)
- Militia (United Kingdom)
- Special Reserve
- Devon Trained Bands
- Devon Militia
- North Devon Militia
- East Devon Militia
- Devon Artillery Militia
