= Exeter and South Devon Volunteers =

Exeter and South Devon Volunteers 1st (Exeter and South Devon) Volunteer Battalion, Devonshire Regiment 4th Battalion, Devonshire Regiment Devonshire Regiment (1st Rifle Volunteers)
- Active: 26 March 1852–1 April 1967
- Country: United Kingdom
- Branch: Volunteer Force/Territorial Force
- Role: Infantry
- Size: 1-3 Battalions
- Part of: 43rd (Wessex) Division
- Garrison/HQ: Exeter
- Nickname(s): '1st Rifle Volunteers'
- Engagements: Second Boer War; First World War: Mesopotamia; Palestine; Second World War: Defence of Gibraltar

Commanders
- Notable commanders: Lt-Col Hugh Acland Troyte

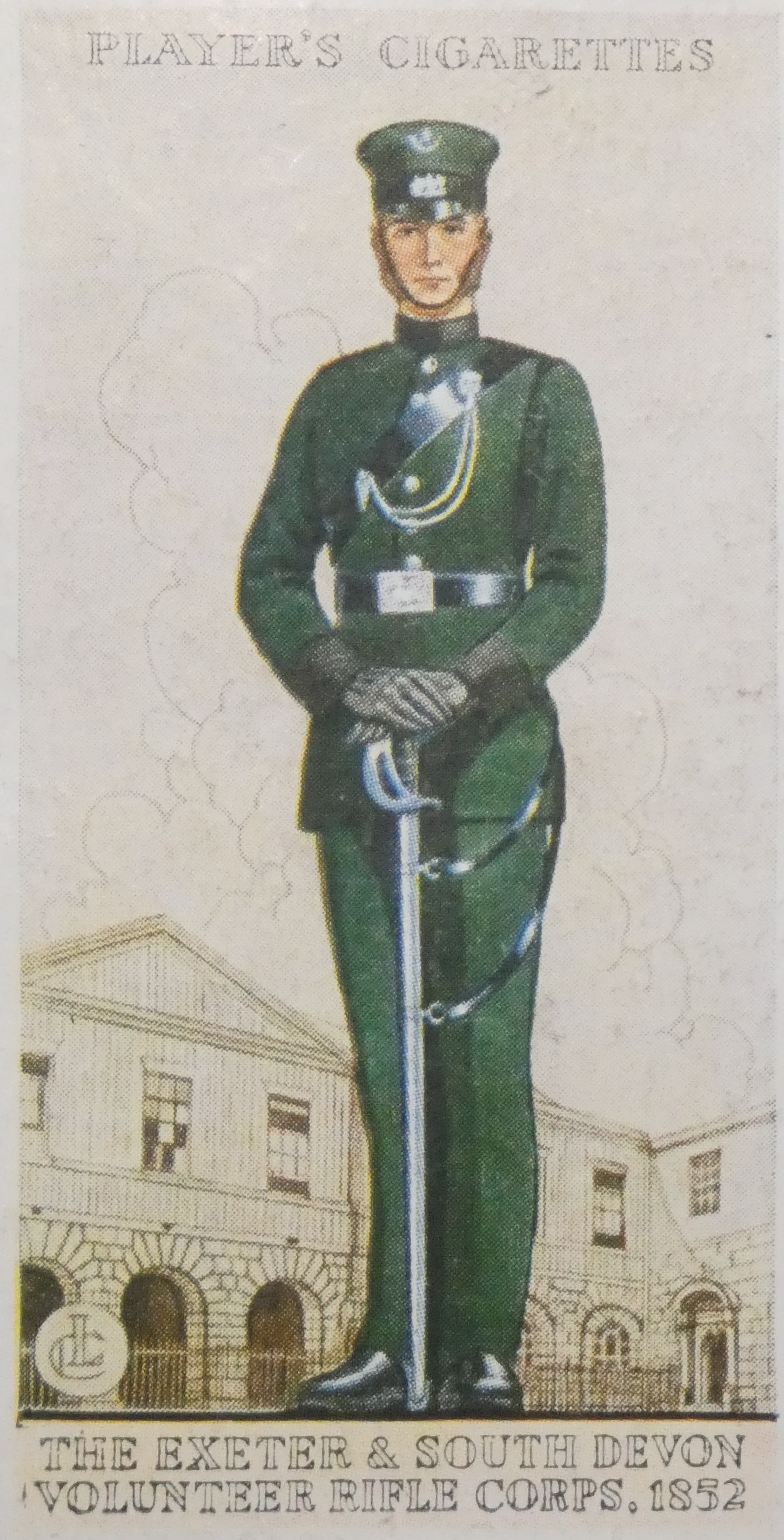
Officer of the Exeter & South Devon Volunteers in 1852

The Exeter & South Devon Volunteers was the premier unit of Britain's Volunteer Force. Formed in 1852 it went on to become a battalion of the Devonshire Regiment. Both its active service battalions went to garrison India on the outbreak of the First World War, and then saw action in Mesopotamia and Palestine. In the Second World War, the battalion served in the garrison of Gibraltar. It continued in the postwar Territorial Army until it was merged with other West Country units. Its successors today serve in a reserve battalion of The Rifles.

== Volunteer Force ==
Part-time volunteer units had often been organised in Britain in time of war to serve in local defence and supplement the Regular Army and Militia, but these were always stood down when the threat of invasion had passed. Concerns about national defence re-emerged after Louis Napoleon seized power in France in 1851. The Militia was reorganised in 1852, but there was agitation to allow the formation of volunteer units as well. The government was unenthusiastic, but on 26 March 1852 the Home Secretary in Lord Derby's short-lived Who? Who? ministry, Spencer Horatio Walpole, did accept an offer of service arising from a meeting held in January at the Exeter Athenaeum to discuss the dangers to the Devonshire coastline. The prime movers were Dr (later Sir) John Charles Bucknill, superintendent of the Devon County Asylum at Exminster, and William Denis Moore, town clerk of Exeter, whose proposal was forwarded by the Lord Lieutenant of Devon, Earl Fortescue (who was Colonel of the 1st Devon Militia). The Exeter & South Devon Volunteer Rifle Battalion of two companies was accepted under the Volunteer Act 1804, which was still in force. The first officers' commissions were signed by Queen Victoria (Note: Officers appointed to later RVCs had commissions issued by the Lord Lieutenant of their county.) on 4 January 1853, with Sir Edmund Prideaux, 9th Baronet, as Major-Commandant and Denis Moore as adjutant. The volunteers had been drilling since the summer of 1852 in the Castle Yard at Exeter, initially in civilian clothes until a uniform was decided upon.

The enthusiasm for the Volunteer movement following a renewed invasion scare in 1859 saw the creation of many new Rifle Volunteer Corps (RVCs) across the country, and the government began to supply them with the new Enfield Rifle. Captain Moore of the Exeter & South Devon Rifles helped to draw up the rules governing the new corps and his unit was adopted on 23 September 1859 as the 1st (Exeter & South Devon) Devonshire Rifle Volunteer Corps. Because of its premier position in the Volunteer Force, the unit was unofficially known as the 1st Rifle Volunteers; (Note: The Honourable Artillery Company, with a history dating back to 1537, joined the Volunteer Force in 1860, but with its ancient privileges it was always a unique organisation. Queen Victoria's Rifles (later the 1st Middlesex RVC) claimed a continuous history as a rifle club from the Volunteers of 1803, but was not officially adopted until 1853.) this became an official subtitle in 1958.

The popularity of the Volunteers led to an increase in the number of companies in the 1st Devonshire RVC, with detachments at Exmouth, Crediton, Dawlish and Teignmouth (Note: It is likely that the numbers of the 7th, 12th and 15th Devonshire RVCs, which were never formed, had been intended for some of these places.) and in 1860 it absorbed the 24th (Budleigh Salterton) Devonshire RVC. By the early 1860s the corps had 11 companies, and the 1st Devonshire Engineer Volunteer Corps at Torquay was attached to it for drill and administration from 1863 to 1869. Sir Edmund Prideaux retired from the command and was appointed Honorary Colonel on 8 February 1862, when Maj Arthur Charles Chichester was promoted to succeed him as lieutenant-colonel, and Capt Moore was promoted to major. Lord Poltimore became CO on 27 September 1865, followed by Sir William Walrond, 2nd Baronet (formerly captain in the Grenadier Guards) on 9 June 1877. A retired Regular Army major, Sir Dudley Duckworth-King, 5th Baronet, became CO on 12 December 1894.

=== 1st Volunteer Battalion ===
Under the 'Localisation of the Forces' scheme introduced by the Cardwell Reforms of 1872, Volunteers were grouped into county brigades with their local Regular and Militia battalions. For the Exeter & South Devon battalion this was Brigade No 34 (County of Devon) in Western District alongside the 11th Foot, the 1st Devon Militia and the 2nd Devon Militia. The Childers Reforms of 1881 took Cardwell's reforms further, and the Volunteers were formally affiliated to their local Regular regiment, with the 11th Foot becoming the Devonshire Regiment and the 1st Devonshire RVC becoming one of its Volunteer Battalions on 1 July 1881. The RVC changed its title on 1 November 1885 to 1st (Exeter & South Devon) Volunteer Battalion. By 1889 the battalion was distributed as follows:

- Battalion headquarters (HQ) at 16 Castle Street, Exeter,
- A–E Companies at Exeter
- F Company at Manchester House, Exmouth (Ferry Road by 1893)
- G Company at High Street, Crediton
- H & I Companies at Somerset House, Teignmouth
  Exeter School formed a Cadet Corps affiliated to the battalion in 1897.

=== 3rd Volunteer Battalion ===
While the Volunteers in Exeter formed a single large battalion, a number of smaller RVCs were being raised in the small rural towns of East Devon. In August 1860 these were formed into the 1st Administrative Battalion, Devonshire Rifle Volunteer Corps with its HQ also at Exeter, under the command of Lt-Col Sir Thomas Dyke Acland, 11th Baronet:

- 5th (Upper Cullompton) Devonshire Rifle Volunteer Corps, formed 22 March 1860 at Upper Culm Vale, moved to Cullompton in 1862
- 8th (Buckerell) Devonshire Rifle Volunteer Corps, formed 8 February 1860
- 11th (Bampton) Devonshire Rifle Volunteer Corps, formed 28 February 1860,
- 13th (East Devon and Honiton) Devonshire Rifle Volunteer Corps, formed 20 February 1860
- 14th (Tiverton) Devonshire Rifle Volunteer Corps, formed 1 March 1860
- 20th (Broadhembury) Devonshire Rifle Volunteer Corps, formed 3 March 1860; disbanded 1875
- 25th (Ottery St Mary) Devonshire Rifle Volunteer Corps, formed 4 April 1860
- 27th (Colyton) Devonshire Rifle Volunteer Corps, formed 12 December 1860

Dyke Acland was an enthusiast for the concept of Mounted Rifle Volunteers and several such units were raised in Devonshire, five by Acland himself, of which the following were attached to the 1st Admin Battalion:

- 1st (Clyst) Devonshire Mounted Rifle Volunteer Corps, formed at Broadclyst on 23 February 1860 by Sir Thomas Dyke Acland; commanded by his son Charles Thomas Dyke Acland from 1862; disbanded 1877
- 2nd (Exminster) Devonshire Mounted Rifle Volunteer Corps, formed on 5 March 1860; disbanded December 1861
- 3rd (Upottery) Devonshire Mounted Rifle Volunteer Corps, formed on 10 April 1860; absorbed by 1st MRV 1872

Apart from the mounted riflemen who were generally farmers and members of hunts, the battalion recruited mainly from agricultural labourers, and in 1864 had to arrange its annual camp in July between the hay harvest and the corn harvest.

When the RVCs were consolidated in 1880, the battalion was redesignated the 3rd Devonshire RVC and its seven component corps became A–G Companies. It became a VB of the Devons in 1881 and was numbered as the 3rd Volunteer Battalion in 1885, when a new H Company was added at Sidmouth. In 1900 I Company was formed at Axminster and affiliated cadet corps were formed at Allhallows School, Honiton, and Blundell's School, Tiverton.

Charles Williams-Troyte of Huntsham, formerly of the Royal 1st Devon Yeomanry, took command of the battalion in 1881 when Sir Thomas Dyke Acland (his uncle) became honorary colonel. Sir John Kennaway, 3rd Baronet, VD, who had raised the 25th Devonshire RVC in 1860, became CO of the 3rd VB on 12 July 1894. He later became Hon Colonel, a role he still fulfilled on the outbreak of the First World War.

The 3rd VB was distributed as follows:

- HQ at 7 Well Street, Exeter; moved to 4 Leighton Terrace, Exeter, by the early 1900s
- A Company at Cullompton
- B Company at Buckerell
- C Company drill hall at Brook Street, Bampton
- D Company drill hall at Dowell Street and armoury at High Street, Honiton
- E Company built its drill hall and armoury with associated house for the Sergeant Instructor at Newport Street, Tiverton in 1884
- F Company at Ottery St Mary Town Hall
- G Company at Queen Street, Colyton
- H Company at Castle Hill, Axminster

=== Mobilisation schemes ===
When a comprehensive mobilisation scheme for the Volunteers was established after the Stanhope Memorandum of December 1888, the 1st and 3rd VBs of the Devons were assigned to the Plymouth Brigade, charged with defending the Royal Navy's base at Plymouth. This brigade, which soon included all the VBs of the Devonshires and the Duke of Cornwall's Light Infantry (DCLI), was renamed the Devon Brigade in 1901 and the DCLI later moved to a different formation.

=== Second Boer War ===
Service companies from both volunteer battalions served with the Regulars in the Second Boer War, gaining the battalions their first Battle honours: South Africa 1900–01 for the 1st VB, South Africa 1901 for the 3rd VB. After the war Lt-Col Charles Marwood Tucker (who had served in South Africa as a lieutenant in the Imperial Yeomanry), became CO of the 3rd VB.

== Territorial Force ==
When the Volunteers were subsumed into the new Territorial Force (TF) under the Haldane Reforms of 1908, the 1st (Exeter & South Devon) VB amalgamated with the 3rd VB to form the 4th Battalion, Devonshire Regiment. (Note: The previous 4th Battalion (1st Devon Militia) became the 3rd (Special Reserve) Battalion in 1908.) The school cadet corps associated with the former battalions all transferred to the junior division of the Officers' Training Corps.

The new battalion was organised as follows by 1914:

- Battalion HQ at Bedford Circus, Exeter
- A Company: Exeter, with a detachment at Broadclyst
- B & C Companies: Exeter
- D Company: Drill Hall, St Andrews Road, Exmouth with detachments at Budleigh Salterton and Lympstone
- E Company: Drill Hall being built at King Street, West Exe, Tiverton, to replace the 1884 building in Newport Street; detachment at Dulverton, Somerset
  - Half Company: Drill Hall, Brook Street, Bampton
- F Company: Sidmouth
  - Left Half Company: Drill Hall, High Street, Honiton
- G Company: Drill Hall, The Green Cullompton (shared with D Company, 7th (Cyclist) Bn, and part of A Squadron, Royal 1st Devon Yeomanry); detachments at Burlescombe and Uffculme
- H Company: Drill Hall, Silver Street, Axminster; detachments at Chardstock and at Drill Hall, Church Street, Lyme Regis, Dorset
  - Left Half Company: South Street, Colyton

The Exeter Cathedral School Cadet Company was also affiliated to the battalion.

The battalion formed part of the Devon and Cornwall Brigade in the TF's Wessex Division.

The CO from 5 March 1913 was Lt-Col Hugh Acland Troyte of Huntsham Court, second son of the former CO of the 3rd VB. He had served as a Regular officer in the 20th Hussars from 1894 to 1898. After retiring from the army he joined his father's former battalion, taking command of the Bampton company and being instrumental in the construction of the new drill hall at Tiverton.

== First World War ==
=== Mobilisation ===
On 26 July 1914, the Wessex Division was on Salisbury Plain, beginning its annual training. Three days later, with the international situation deteriorating, the division was warned to take 'precautionary measures'. The divisional HQ returned to Exeter and the units took up their precautionary posts, with the infantry brigades at defended ports in South West England. 4th Devons arrived at Plymouth on 4 August, on which date the division was ordered to mobilise for war. On 9 August the battalion returned to Salisbury Plain, this time under war conditions.

After the outbreak of war, units of the TF were invited to volunteer for Overseas Service. On 15 August 1914, the War Office issued instructions to separate those men who had signed up for Home Service only, and form these into reserve units. On 31 August, the formation of a reserve or 2nd Line unit was authorised for each 1st Line unit where 60 per cent or more of the men had volunteered for Overseas Service. The titles of these 2nd Line units would be the same as the original, but distinguished by a '2/' prefix. In this way duplicate battalions, brigades and divisions were created, mirroring those TF formations being sent overseas, and absorbing the large numbers of volunteers coming forward. Later the 2nd Line TF battalions were raised to full strength ready to go overseas, and began to form Reserve (3rd Line) units to supply reinforcement drafts.

=== 1/4th Battalion ===
==== India ====
On 24 September, the 1st Wessex Division accepted liability for service in British India to relieve Regular units for the Western Front. The division's infantry battalions and field artillery embarked at Southampton on 9 October and sailed via Gibraltar, Malta, and the Suez Canal. The Devon battalions went to Karachi, where they disembarked on 11 November.

Although the 1st Wessex was officially numbered the 43rd (Wessex) Division in early 1915, it never served as a complete formation during the war: on arrival in India all its units were distributed to various garrisons. 1/4th Devons went to Ferozepore and came under the orders of 3rd Lahore Divisional Area (3rd (Lahore) Division having already sailed for the Western Front). In February 1915 it joined the independent 44th (Ferozepore) Brigade.

No reinforcements reached the Wessex units during 1915, and their strength began to dwindle, made worse by the requirement to provide drafts for other theatres of war, while many of the best Non-Commissioned Officers (NCOs) were taken away for officer training. Modern short Lee–Enfield rifles were received during 1915, and some units went to the Mesopotamian Front. By 1916 it was clear that the complete 43rd (Wessex) Division could not be returned to the Western Front as intended, so instead training was pushed forwards in India, some drafts were received from home, and the remaining units prepared for service in Mesopotamia.

==== Mesopotamia ====
The 1/4th Devons arrived at Basra with 41st Indian Brigade on 2 March 1916. The brigade did duty on the Lines of Communication, moving up the Tigris during the last failed attempt to relieve the Siege of Kut. The battalion then joined 42nd Indian Brigade in April, moving in June to 37th Indian Brigade at Shaikh Said in the newly-formed 14th Indian Division. It served as the British component in the brigade composed of 1/2nd Gurkha Rifles, 36th Sikhs and 45th Rattray's Sikhs. After the fall of Kut, the British forces in Mesopotamia maintained their positions for several months. Although occasionally shelled by the Turks, the battalion's biggest enemy was disease, and during the summer of 1916 some 400 men were admitted to hospital.

A new British offensive began on 14 December 1916 with an advance across the Hai river, then closing in on Kut. On 1 February 1917 37th Brigade attacked the Hai Salient with 35th and 45th Sikhs, but they were driven back to their starting positions. A fresh attack by the 1/4th Devons and 1/2nd Gurkhas was cancelled because of the Sikh wounded congesting the trenches. 14th Division intended to renew its attack next day, but mist prevented artillery observation, so it was postponed to 3 February. A 10.40, after 10 minutes' intense artillery preparation, the two fresh battalions attacked, 1/4th Devons on the left in eight waves on a frontage of 150 yards (140 m). They advanced 'with great dash' and within 10 minute had captured the two Turkish trench lines that comprised their objective. Several Turkish counter-attacks were broken up by artillery and rifle fire, the Devons and Gurkhas being reinforced by the 62nd Punjabis. The victory came at a price: out of 15 officers and 403 other ranks of the Devons who attacked, only five officers and 186 men came out unscathed; the battalion's total casualties in the battle amounted to 283.

It was the battalion's only major action: later in the month the reduced battalion was transferred to Corps Troops at Amarah for the Tigris defences and to work on the Lines of Communication. The survivors spent the rest of the war building roads, guarding prisoners and administering refugee camps.

Lieutenant-Colonel Acland Troyte left for the UK on sick leave, and after recovering was sent to command a 'sub-area' behind the lines on the Western Front. He later served on the staff of IX Corps which went with the British Force sent to the Italian Front. The Corps HQ was back in France at the time of the German spring offensive; Lt-Col Acland Troyte was killed on 17 April 1918, and buried at Berguette Churchyard.

When the Mesopotamian campaign ended with the Armistice of Mudros on 31 October 1918, 1/4th Devons was at Baqubah, north-east of Baghdad. It was demobilised on 28 August 1919.

==== Commanding officers ====
The following officers commanded 1/4th Bn during the war:

- Lt-Col Hugh Leonard Acland-Troyte, from mobilisation until invalided 15 July 1917
- Lt-Col Colin Percy Tremlett, from 15 July 1917 to end of war

=== 2/4th Battalion ===
==== India ====
The 2/4th Battalion Devonshire Regiment was formed at Exeter on 16 September 1914 as the 1/4th Bn was preparing to go overseas, and became part of the 2nd Devon & Cornwall Brigade in 2nd Wessex Division. It was quickly decided to send this division to India as well, where it could replace further Regular units and continue its training. It embarked at Southampton on 12 December, arriving early in January 1915. Like the 43rd, the 45th (2nd Wessex) Division (as it was later numbered), never served together, and its units were immediately distributed to peacetime stations across India. The 2/4th Devons joined Southern Brigade, 9th (Secunderabad) Division, which was carrying out internal security duties in southern India.

2/4th Devons remained in Madras, training and despatching drafts to the 1/4th Bn in Mesopotamia and for miscellaneous duties all over India. As with the 43rd, it became clear in 1916 that the 45th (2nd Wessex) Division could not be reformed as intended, and its units were progressively detached to active fronts. On 15 October 1917 the 2/4th Devons sailed from Bombay for Egypt, arriving at Suez on 25 October.

==== Palestine ====
At first the battalion was employed on Line of Communication duties at Qantara, but on 13 December 1917 at Ramla in Palestine it joined 234th Brigade in 75th Division. This formation had been created mainly from British TF units arriving from India with a few Indian battalions. The division had already seen a good deal of action at the Third Battle of Gaza and the operations that led to the Capture of Jerusalem.

2/4th Devons took over and extended the line at Deir Ballut on 14 March 1918, holding the position until the end of the month. It suffered more casualties from disease than from Turkish fire. 75th Division attacked on 9 April during the Action of Berukin, with 234th Brigade aiming capturing 'Three Bushes Hill' after a stiff fight. But the division could not press on, and Three Bushes Hill was evacuated on 21 April.

75th Division was reorganised on the lines of an Indian division in the summer of 1918, releasing surplus British troops to bring other units up to strength and later for service on the Western Front. 2/4th Devons left for Egypt in July and the battalion was disbanded on 17 August 1918 at Wadi Ballut in Egypt, with the men being drafted elsewhere.

==== Commanding officers ====
The following officers commanded 2/4th Bn:

- Lt-Col Charles Marwood-Tucker, from 23 September 1914 to 19 March 1918
- Lt-Col Cecil Edward Rice, 19 March until invalided 5 April 1918
- Maj Douglas Henry Avory, acting 5 to 30 April 1918
- Lt-Col John Nicolson Macrae, 1 May to 12 July 1918
- Lt-Col John Robert Birchall, from 12 July 1917 to end of war

=== 3/4th Battalion ===
The 3/4th Battalion Devonshire Regiment was formed at Exeter on 23 March 1915 and in the autumn it went with the other 3rd Line battalions of the Devons to Bournemouth. It was renamed the 4th (Reserve) Battalion on 8 April 1916, and when the Training Reserve (TR) was formed on 1 September it absorbed the 5th (Reserve) (Prince of Wales's) and 6th (Reserve) battalions of the regiment at Hursley Park, Winchester. The battalion, with an establishment of 2085 men under training, now formed part of the Wessex Reserve Brigade in Southern Command.

By March 1917 the battalion was training on Salisbury Plain, first at Sutton Veny, then in early 1918 at Larkhill. In April 1918 it left the Wessex Reserve Brigade and was sent to Ireland, where it was stationed at various times at Belfast, Derry and Clonmany, County Donegal. The battalion was disbanded on 27 August 1919 at Randalstown.

==== Commanding officers ====
The following officers commanded 3/4th Bn:

- Capt Eric George Cardew from 25 March to 20 October 1915
- Lt-Col Arthur Graves Spratt from 1 November 1915 to 4 July 1916
- Lt-Col Nathaniel Robert Radcliffe from 4 July 1916 to end of war

=== 15th Battalion ===
In February 1915 the remaining Home Service and unfit men were separated from the Second and Third Line Battalions to form brigades of Coast Defence Battalions (termed Provisional Battalions from June 1915). The men from the five TF battalions of the Devons and DCLI were formed into the Devon and Cornwall Brigade Provisional Battalion, later designated 86th Provisional Battalion, as part of 10th Provisional Brigade. By July 1916 the brigade was at Herne Bay in Kent under the command of Southern Army of Central Force.

The Military Service Act 1916 swept away the Home/Foreign service distinction, and all TF soldiers became liable for overseas service, if medically fit. The Provisional Brigades thus became anomalous, and on 1 January 1917 the remaining battalions became numbered battalions of their parent units: 86th Provisional Bn became 15th Battalion, Devonshire Regiment, and 10th Provisional Brigade became the 227th Mixed Brigade. Part of these units' role alongside the TR units was physical conditioning to render men fit for drafting overseas. The brigade never served overseas: it moved to Aldeburgh in 1918 and was attached to 67th (2nd Home Counties) Division. The battalion was commanded by Lt-Col Albert Edward Kirk from 1 January 1917 to the end of the war. It was disbanded on 12 June 1919 at Aldingham Camp, Lancashire.

== Interwar ==
The TF was reformed on 7 February 1920 and reorganised as the Territorial Army (TA) the following year. As before, the 4th Devons were in 130th (Devon and Cornwall) Brigade in 43rd (Wessex) Division. In the 1920s the Exeter Cadet Battalion and The King's School, Ottery St Mary, cadet company were affiliated to the battalion.

After the Munich Crisis in late 1938 the TA was doubled in size, and once again its units formed duplicates. The 4th Battalion's duplicate was the 8th Battalion (taking the number of the regiment's first 'Kitchener's Army' battalion in World War I), which was formed on 25 May 1939 at Yelverton.

== Second World War ==
=== Mobilisation ===
The TA's infantry units mobilised on 1 September 1939, two days before war was declared. At the time of mobilisation the duplicate 45th Division was still being organised, so both 1st and 2nd Line units were administered by 43rd (Wessex) Division HQ. 4th and 8th Devons were therefore both serving in 134th Brigade, together with the 6th Battalion. 45th Division HQ assumed control of the brigade on 7 September, and it spent the Phoney War period training in its West Country home area under Southern Command.

=== 4th Battalion ===
==== Gibraltar ====
On 17 May 1940, just as the Battle of France was under way, 4th Devons left 45th Division and sailed to Gibraltar, landing on 30 May to reinforce the garrison of this vital base in view of tensions with Italy (which entered the war on 11 June). Gibraltar suffered bombing raids from both the Italian and Vichy French air forces, and Human torpedo attacks against shipping, but no land attacks, despite the Germans planning Operation Felix to take the Rock with Spanish support. On 24 April 1941 4th Devons came under the command of 2nd Gibraltar Brigade.

==== Home Defence ====
Having spent almost three years in the fortress, the battalion left 2nd Gibraltar Bde on 24 April 1943 and by the end of the year was back with 134th Bde in Home Forces in the UK. By now 45th Division had been placed on a lower establishment and was not expected to go overseas. On 3 April 1944 4th Devons transferred within the division to 135th Bde, but this was disbanded on 20 July as men were drained away to reinforce units fighting in Normandy. 4th Devons transferred back to 134th Bde, but this was also due to be disbanded with the rest of 45th Division, so on 1 August it moved to 164th Bde in 55th (West Lancashire) Infantry Division. This was a 1st Line division that had been brought back from Northern Ireland and placed on a higher establishment. But it too was destined not to see any service before the war ended. Both the division and the brigade were demobilised after VE Day, leaving 4th Devons to transfer to 183rd Bde in 61st Division, which was reorganising as a light division.

=== 8th Battalion ===
8th Devonshires had remained with 45th Division when the 4th Battalion went to Gibraltar. It had been stationed in the prime invasion area of the Sussex Coast while the Battle of Britain raged overhead. By the Spring of 1941 it was in GHQ Reserve in the Midlands, but at the end of the year the division's role was reduced as it was placed on a lower establishment.

8th Devons left 134th Bde on 3 January 1943, transferring to 203rd Bde in 77th (Reserve) Division. 77th Division was later downgraded further to a 'Holding' division and on 2 November 1943 the battalion transferred to 211th Bde in 80th (Reserve) Division, a reinforcement training formation, until July 1944.

The battalion was placed in suspended animation on 10 December 1944.

== Postwar ==
When the TA began reforming on 1 January 1947 the 4th Battalion was still on active service. It was placed in suspended animation on 28 February 1947 and reformed the next day (1 March), re-absorbing the 8th Bn. Battalion HQ and A & B Companies were at Exeter once more, C Company at Tiverton and D Company at Honiton. It now formed part of 130 (West Country) Infantry Bde in 43rd (Wessex) Division.

On 15 May 1950 all three of the Devonshire Regiment's TA battalions – 4th, 5th (Prince of Wales's), and 628 Heavy Anti-Aircraft Regiment, Royal Artillery (formerly 6th Bn) – merged into a single 4th Battalion (though many of the AA gunners went to 296th (Royal Devon Yeomanry) Field Regiment, Royal Artillery). 5th Battalion was represented by a company at Plymouth and 6th Bn by a company at Barnstaple.

When the Devonshire Regiment and the Dorset Regiment merged in 1958 to create the Devonshire and Dorset Regiment, the TA battalion was redesignated the Devonshire Regiment (1st Rifle Volunteers), making official the 1st Rifle Volunteers title that it had unofficially used for many years.

In 1967 the TA was reduced into the Territorial and Army Volunteer Reserve (TAVR) and the battalion was reconstituted as two units at Exeter:

- HQ Company (Devon), Wessex Volunteers, in TAVR II
- C Squadron, The Devonshire Territorials (Royal Devon Yeomanry/1st Rifle Volunteers) in TAVR III

The TAVR was further reorganised in 1969, when the TAVR III element was reduced to a cadre and then reconstituted as D (Royal Devon Yeomanry/1st Rifle Volunteers) Squadron, Royal Wessex Yeomanry, at Barnstaple. In 1974 the '1st Rifle Volunteers' subtitle s dropped and that lineage ended.

Meanwhile, the TAVR II element reorganised 1970–71 as E Company (Devon), 1st Battalion, Wessex Volunteers, at Exeter with platoons at Plymouth and Barnstaple. The Wessex Volunteers became the 1st Battalion, Wessex Regiment (Rifle Volunteers) in 1972.

However, in 1987, E Company was separated and expanded to form 4th (Volunteer) Battalion, The Devonshire and Dorset Regiment (1st Rifle Volunteers), with the following organisation:.

- HQ at Wyvern Barracks, Exeter
- A Company at Plymouth
- B Company raised at Paignton in 1988, reduced to Paignton platoon in HQ Company in 1992
- C Company at Dorchester and Poole, Dorset, transferred from 2nd Bn Wessex Regiment (Volunteers) in 1990
- D Company at Poole, transferred from 2nd Bn Wessex Regiment (Volunteers) in 1992

In the further reductions to the TA in 1999, 4th (V) Bn amalgamated with 6th (V) Bn, The Light Infantry and part of 2nd (V) Bn, Royal Gloucestershire, Berkshire and Wiltshire Regiment to form The Rifle Volunteers, to which it contributed E (Devonshire and Dorset Regiment) Company by amalgamation of HQ and A Companies. In 2005 the company's subtitle was altered to 'Devonshire and Dorset Light Infantry', and in 2007 The Rifle Volunteers became 6th Battalion, The Rifles.

== Uniforms ==
The uniform of the Exeter & South Devon Volunteers was Rifle green with black facings. The 1st Admin Battalion wore Volunteer grey with green facings. The 1st and 3rd VBs kept these colours. Indeed, a War Office Colour Committee in 1883 recommended the grey uniform of the 3rd as the pattern for the new service dress for the whole army to replace the traditional scarlet; in the event the army chose Indian Khaki. After the Second Boer War the 3rd VB adopted 'Drab' (light khaki) for its uniform, as popularised by the Imperial Yeomanry (in which their CO had served). The 4th Battalion retained its Rifle green full dress until 1914 even when the other TF battalions adopted the scarlet uniform with Lincoln green facings of the Devonshires. However, by the time it was reformed in the 1920s scarlet and Lincoln green were listed for the increasingly rare full dress uniform.

== Honorary Colonels ==
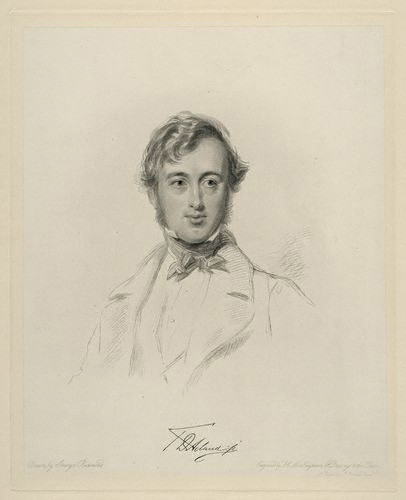
Sir Thomas Dyke Acland, Bt, CO and later Hon Colonel, 3rd Volunteer Battalion.

The following served as Honorary Colonel of the battalions:

1st (Exeter & South Devon) Battalion

- Sir Edmund Prideaux, 9th Baronet, former CO, appointed 8 February 1862
- William Courtenay, 11th Earl of Devon, appointed 2 June 1877
- Gen Sir Redvers Buller, VC, GCB, KCMG, appointed 4 May 1892

3rd Volunteer Battalion

- Sir Thomas Dyke Acland, 11th Baronet, former CO, appointed 17 August 1881, died 1898
- Sir John Kennaway, 3rd Baronet, VD, former CO, appointed 31 December 1902, continued with 4th Battalion (TF)

4th Battalion

- Charles Marwood Tucker, former CO, appointed 29 July 1920
- Colin Percy Tremlett, CBE, TD, former CO, appointed 29 July 1925, still in post in 1939
- Godfrey Charles Wycisk, OBE, TD, from 5th (PoW) Battalion, 1950
- Dennis Argent Bulllock, OBE, from 628 Heavy AA Regiment, appointed 5 August 1951

Devonshire Regiment (1st Rifle Volunteers)

- John Nevill Oliver, CBE, TD, appointed 28 September 1958
- Alfred William Anstey, TD, appointed 28 September 1963, to 1967

== Memorials ==
In 1895 the 1st Devonshire VB erected a memorial in Northernhay Gardens, Exeter, to commemorate the formation of the Exeter & South Devon Volunteers. The memorial comprises a small Renaissance pillar by local sculptor Harry Hems, with plaque recording the names of the first officers commissioned, the committee responsible for its formation, and the list of places from which the first recruits were drawn: Exeter, Cullompton, Tiverton, Bovey Tracey, Exmouth, Honiton, Brixham, Torquay and Totnes.

There is a stone plaque in the Devonshire Regiment Chapel in Exeter Cathedral commemorating the men of 1/4th, 2/4th and 3/4th Devons who died in India, Mesopotamia, Palestine and elsewhere during the First World War.

== External sources ==
- Mark Conrad, The British Army, 1914 (archive site)
- British Army units from 1945 on
- Commonwealth War Graves Commission
- The Drill Hall Project
- Imperial War Museum, War Memorials Register
- Infantry Battalion COs of World War I
- The Keep Military Museum
- The Long, Long Trail
- Land Forces of Britain, the Empire and Commonwealth – Regiments.org (archive site)
- Graham Watson, The Territorial Army 1947
