= Shire levy =

Medieval UK military conscription

A shire levy was a means of military recruitment in medieval England and Scotland. As opposed to a levy of noble families, a shire levy was effected within a geographical administrative area (a shire), entailing the mobilisation of able-bodied men between the ages of 16 and 60 for military duty under command of their sheriff.

The English shire levy was descended from the Anglo-Saxon Fyrd, and continued under the Norman kings, notably at the Battle of the Standard (1138). The force was reorganised under the Assizes of Arms of 1181 and 1252, and again by King Edward I's Statute of Winchester of 1285.

Shire levies were especially important for England during the Hundred Years' War, when the escalation in warfare with France increased the need for soldiers: "the king was able to rely on the military support of the nobility and of the shire levies."

Traditionally, the Scottish shire levies were called out by riders galloping through towns and villages bearing the 'Fiery Cross'.

== See also ==
- Medieval conscription
