= John Laurie (1797–1864) =

British politician (1797–1864)

Member of Parliament for Barnstaple
- In office 30 March 1857 – 30 April 1859 Serving with William Fraser
- Preceded by: George Buck; Richard Samuel Guinness
- Succeeded by: John Ferguson Davie; George Potts
- In office 25 August 1854 – 2 March 1855 Serving with Richard Samuel Guinness
- Preceded by: Richard Bremridge; William Fraser
- Succeeded by: Richard Samuel Guinness; George Buck

Personal details
- Born: 1797
- Died: 2 August 1864 (aged 67)
- Party: Conservative

John Laurie (1797 – 2 August 1864) was a British Conservative politician.

Laurie was first elected Conservative MP for Barnstaple at a by-election in 1854—caused by the constituency's result at the 1852 general election being declared void on petition due to bribery, leading to the writ for the seat also being suspended in 1853. However, Laurie's term was short-lived after, upon petition, he was unseated in March 1855, due to bribery. He later regained the seat in 1857 and held it until 1859 when he did not seek re-election.

Parliament of the United Kingdom
Preceded by George Buck; Richard Samuel Guinness	Member of Parliament for Barnstaple; 1857–1859; With: William Fraser	Succeeded by John Ferguson Davie; George Potts
Preceded by Richard Bremridge; William Fraser	Member of Parliament for Barnstaple; 1854–1855; With: Richard Samuel Guinness	Succeeded by Richard Samuel Guinness; George Buck
