= Sir William Fraser, 1st Baronet =

Sir William Fraser, Bt FRS
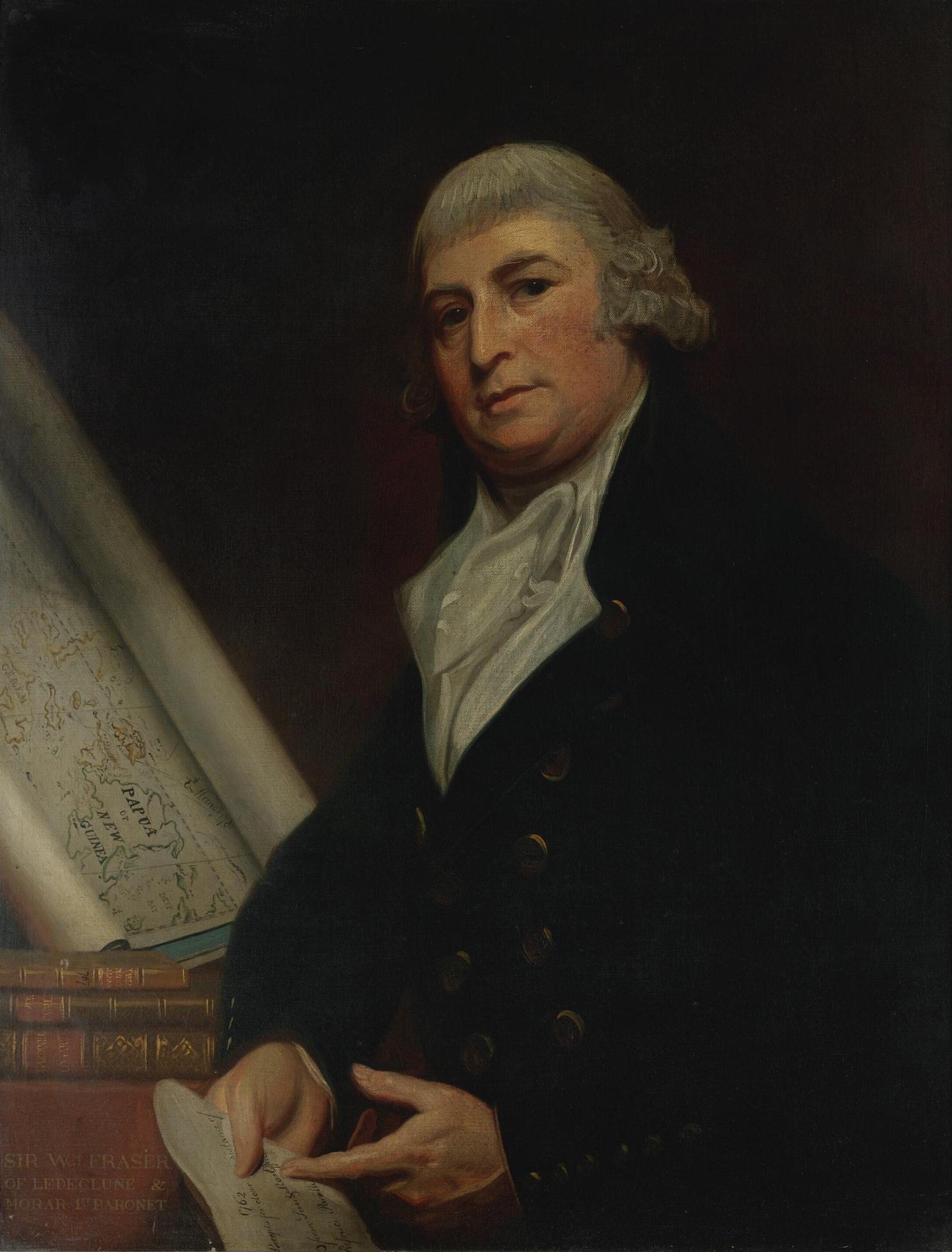
- Portrait of Sir William by George Romney, 1792
- Born: 1737
- Died: 10 February 1818 (aged 80–81)
- Spouse: Elizabeth Farquharson (m. 1786; died 1818)
- Children: Sir James Fraser, 3rd Baronet
- Parent(s): William Fraser; Helen Ross

Sir William Fraser, 1st Baronet FRS (1737 – 10 February 1818) was a Scottish shipowner who was involved with the East India Company.

== Early life ==
He was the son of William Fraser of Ledeclune and the former Helen Ross (a daughter of William Ross of Monquieth, Scotland). His sister, Jane Fraser, married Archibald Campbell Fraser, son of Simon Fraser, 11th Lord Lovat.

His paternal grandparents were Hugh Fraser (a direct descendant of Hugh Fraser, 1st Lord Lovat through his second son, Alexander) and Anne Fraser (the daughter of William Fraser). Through his sister, he was uncle to John Simon Frederick Fraser, MP for Inverness-shire from 1796 to 1802.

== Career ==
He joined the East India Company in 1760 and by 1772 had become Captain of the Lord Mansfield, which was lost on the Bengal River in 1773. He was commander of the Earl of Mansfield from 1777 to 1785 with his final voyage during the 1783 to 1784 season. He was particularly notable as being one of the first to fix the longitude at sea through lunar observation. The reference on the map to New Guinea suggests that Fraser was involved with the efforts of Thomas Forest in 1774 to explore New Guinea and establish for the East India Company its trading potential.

Fraser's ship owning business operated from premises at New City Chambers, Bishopsgate in London.

He was made Fellow of the Royal Society in 1791 and an Elder Brethren of Trinity House. The 5th Fraser of Ledeclune, on 27 November 1806, he was created a baronet of Ledeclune in the County of Inverness in the Baronetage of the United Kingdom.

== Personal life ==
On 26 September 1786 Fraser was married to Elizabeth Farquharson (c. 1766–1867), a daughter of London merchant James Farquharson of Eastbury Park, Dorset. Together, they were the parents of at least three sons and eleven daughters, while some accounts say he was the father of twenty-eight children. Their children included:

- Sir William Fraser, 2nd Baronet (1787–1827), who died, unmarried, in India.
- Sir James John Fraser, 3rd Baronet (1789–1834), who married Charlotte Anne Craufurd, daughter of Daniel Craufurd (a son of Sir Alexander Craufurd, 1st Baronet).
- Anne Fraser, who married Col. Henry Edward Keane, son of Sir John Keane, 1st Baronet 1818.
- Jemima Maria Fraser, who married Rev. Joseph Henry Taylor in 1820.
- Jean Helen Fraser (1795–1869), who married John Grove of Ferne House, a son of Thomas Grove and Charlotte Pilfold, in 1818.
- Henrietta Sophia Fraser (1796–1870), who married James Montressor Standen, son of Rev. John Hargrave Standen and Elizabeth Pinnock, in 1819.
- Maria Octavia Fraser (c. 1799–1882), who married Rev. Henry Cockeran in 1825.

Fraser died on 10 February 1818. He was succeeded in the baronetcy by his son, William. Upon William's death without surviving male issue in 1827, the baronetcy passed to his son, James.

=== Descendants ===
Through his son James, he was a grandfather of Sir William Fraser, 4th Baronet, MP for Barnstaple; Lt.-Gen. Sir Charles Craufurd Fraser, was aide-de-camp to the Lord Lieutenant of Ireland; and Lt.-Gen. James Keith Fraser, the Inspector-General of Cavalry in Great Britain and Ireland.

Through his daughter Jean, he was a grandfather of Sir Thomas Fraser Grove, 1st Baronet.

Baronetage of the United Kingdom
New title	Baronet (of Ledeclune); 1806–1818	Succeeded by William Fraser
