= Charles Craufurd Fraser =

Recipient of the Victoria Cross (1829–1895)

Lieutenant-General Sir Charles Craufurd Fraser VC KCB
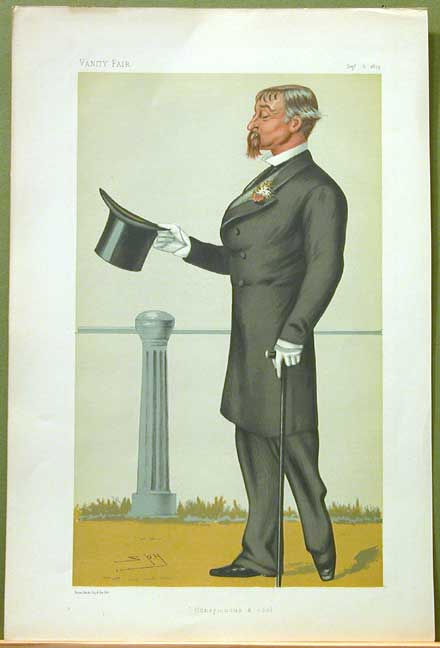
- "Conspicuous & cool". Caricature by "Spy" (Leslie Ward) published in Vanity Fair in 1879

Member of Parliament for Lambeth North
- In office 1885–1892
- Preceded by: New constituency
- Succeeded by: Francis Moses Coldwells

Personal details
- Born: 31 August 1829 London, England
- Died: 7 June 1895 (aged 65) Sloane Street, London
- Resting place: Brompton Cemetery
- Relations: Sir William Fraser, 1st Baronet (grandfather)
- Parent(s): Sir James Fraser; Charlotte Anne Craufurd
- Awards: Victoria Cross; Order of the Bath

Military service
- Allegiance: United Kingdom
- Branch/service: British Army
- Rank: Lieutenant-General
- Unit: 7th Hussars; 11th Hussars
- Battles/wars: Indian Mutiny; Abyssinian War

Lieutenant-General Sir Charles Craufurd Fraser VC KCB (31 August 1829 – 7 June 1895) was a British Army officer and Conservative politician. He was a recipient of the Victoria Cross, the highest and most prestigious award for gallantry in the face of the enemy that can be awarded to British and Commonwealth forces.

== Early life ==
Fraser was the second surviving son of Sir James John Fraser, 3rd Baronet and his wife, Charlotte Anne Craufurd. He had two brothers, Sir William Fraser, 4th Baronet, MP for Barnstaple in 1852 and 1857, and Lieutenant General James Keith Fraser, the Inspector General of Cavalry in Great Britain and Ireland.

His father was the second son of Sir William Fraser, 1st Baronet and Elizabeth Farquharson (a daughter of merchant James Farquharson, of London). His maternal grandparents were Daniel Craufurd (a son of Sir Alexander Craufurd, 1st Baronet) and Bridget Holland (a daughter of Henry Holland).

== Career ==
He joined the 7th Hussars (The Queen's Own), British Army as a cornet in 1847, became lieutenant in 1850 and captain in 1854. On 5 January 1858, he became orderly officer for Brigadier Campbell at Munseata near Allahabad and was promoted to major on 20 July 1858.

Fraser transferred to the 11th Hussars in 1859 and became commanding officer as lieutenant colonel in 1861. He became colonel in 1866 and was commandant at headquarters during the Abyssinian War. He was mentioned in despatches and awarded CB. In 1868, he became Colonel of the 8th King's Royal Irish Hussars and was promoted to major general in 1870. He was aide-de-camp to the Duke of Cambridge, Lord Lieutenant of Ireland from 1873 to 1877. In 1880, he became Inspector General of Cavalry in Ireland until 1884 and was later in command of the cavalry at Aldershot. He retired with the rank of lieutenant general in 1886.

=== Victoria Cross ===
Fraser was 29 years old and a major in the 7th Hussars (The Queen's Own) during the Indian Rebellion of 1857, when the following deed took place on 31 December 1858 at the River Raptee, India, for which he was awarded the VC:

For conspicuous and cool gallantry, on the 31st December, 1858, in having volunteered, at great personal risk, and under a sharp fire of musketry, to swim to the rescue of Captain Stisted, and some men of the 7th Hussars, who were in imminent danger of being drowned in the River Raptee, while in pursuit of the rebels. Major Fraser succeeded in this gallant service, although at the time partially disabled, not having recovered from a severe wound received while leading a Squadron in a charge against some fanatics, in the action of Nawabgunge, on the 13th June, 1858.

He was also awarded the Royal Humane Society's Medal, 1st Class.

=== Political career ===
In 1885, Fraser was elected Member of Parliament for Lambeth North. He was knighted in 1891 and held the Lambeth seat until 1892.

== Personal life ==
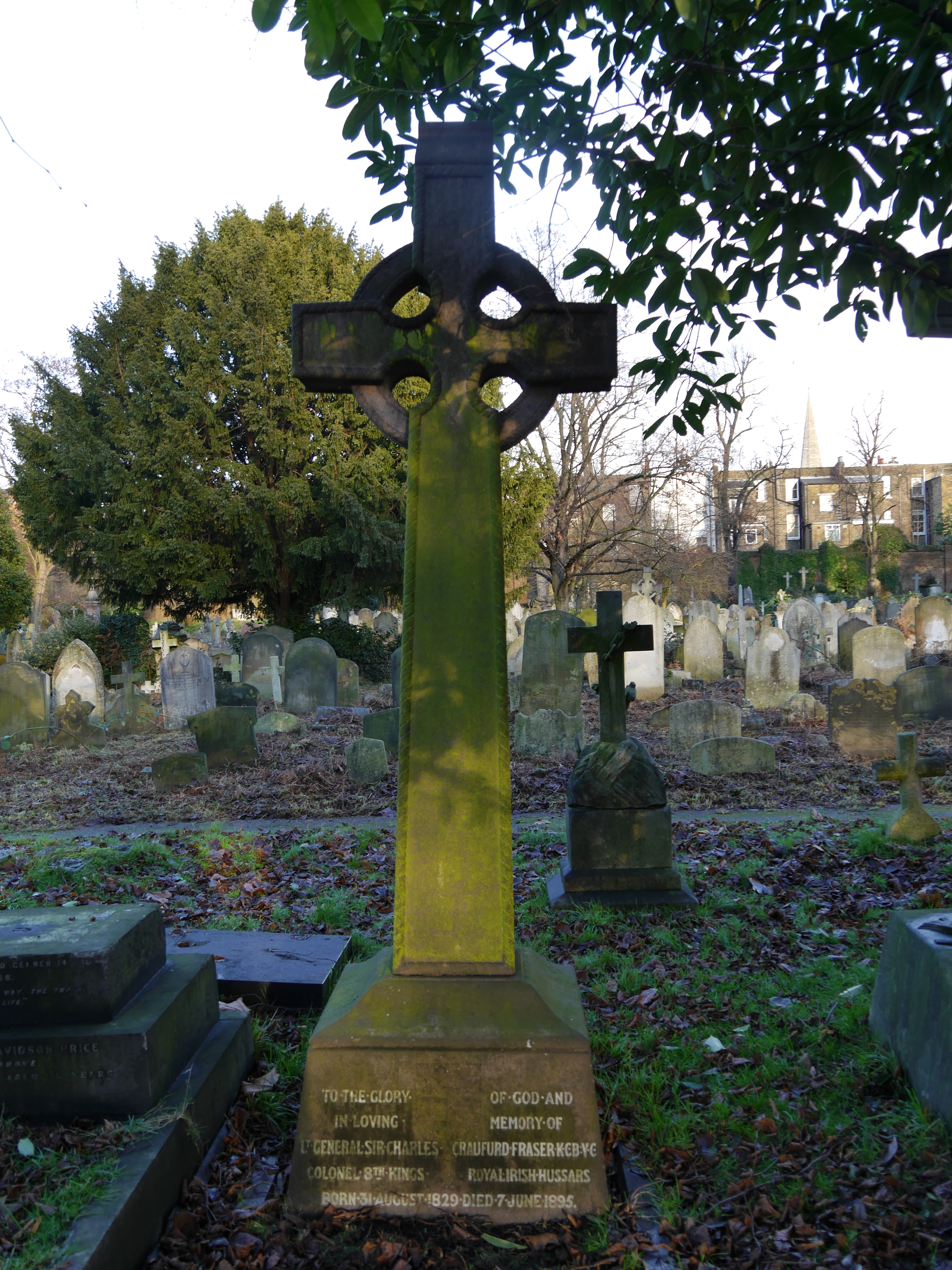
Funerary monument, Brompton Cemetery, London

Fraser died unmarried and without issue in Sloane Street, London on 7 June 1895 at the age of 65.

Parliament of the United Kingdom
New constituency	Member of Parliament for Lambeth North; 1885–1892	Succeeded by Francis Moses Coldwells
