= John Ferguson Davie =

British politician (1830–1907)

Member of Parliament for Barnstaple
- In office 30 April 1859 – 12 July 1865 Serving with Richard Bremridge (1864–1865); Thomas Lloyd (1853–1864); George Potts (1859–1863)
- Preceded by: John Laurie; William Fraser
- Succeeded by: George Stucley; Thomas Cave

Personal details
- Born: John Ferguson; 27 October 1830
- Died: 16 June 1907 (aged 76)
- Party: Liberal
- Spouse: Edwina Augusta Williams (m. 1857)
- Children: 1
- Parent(s): Henry Ferguson Davie; Frances Juliana Davie

Sir John Davie Ferguson Davie, 2nd Baronet (27 October 1830 – 16 June 1907), known as John Ferguson until 1846, was a British Liberal politician, and British Army officer.

== Family ==
Born Ferguson, he was the eldest son of Whig MP for Haddington Burghs Henry Ferguson Davie (then Henry Ferguson) and Frances Juliana Davie. He adopted the additional surname of Davie in 1846 at the same time as his parents. In 1857, he married Edwin Augusta Williams, daughter of Sir James Hamlyn-Williams and Lady Mary Fortescue, and they had at least one child: Mary Fanny Ferguson Davie (born 1857).

== Military career ==
Ferguson Davie became a captain in the Grenadier Guards in 1855, and in the same year fought in the Crimean War. He later became Lieutenant-Colonel commanding the 1st Devon Militia from 1858 to 1867.

== Political career ==
He was elected Liberal MP for Barnstaple at the 1859 general election and held the seat until 1865 when he did not seek re-election.

== Baronetcy ==
He inherited the title of Baronet of Creedy upon his father Henry Ferguson Davie's death on 30 November 1885.

== Other activities ==
Ferguson Davie was also a Justice of the Peace for Devon, Somerset and Carmarthenshire, a Deputy Lieutenant for Devon and Carmarthenshire, and, in 1873, High Sheriff of Carmarthenshire.

Parliament of the United Kingdom
| Preceded by John Laurie; William Fraser | Member of Parliament for Barnstaple; 1859–1865; With: Richard Bremridge (1864–1865); Thomas Lloyd (1853–1864); George Potts (1859–1863) | Succeeded by George Stucley; Thomas Cave |
Baronetage of the United Kingdom
| Preceded by Henry Ferguson Davie | Baronet (of Creedy); 1885–1907 | Succeeded by William Augustus Ferguson Davie |
