= Fraser baronets of Ledeclune (1806) =

Escutcheon of the Fraser baronets of Ledeclune

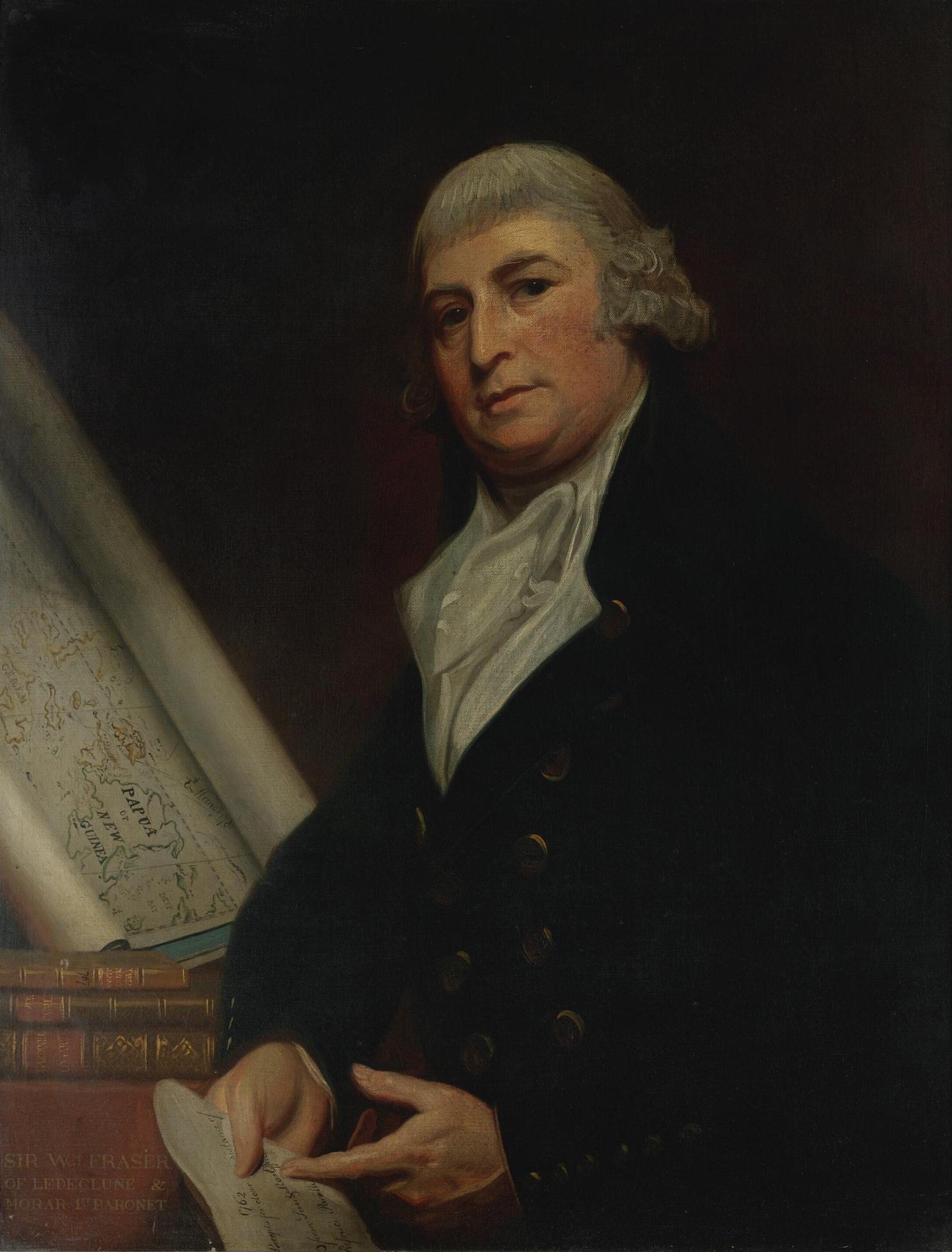
Portrait of Sir William Fraser, 1st Baronet of Ledeclune (1737–1818) by George Romney

The Fraser Baronetcy, of Ledeclune in the County of Inverness, was created in the Baronetage of the United Kingdom on 27 November 1806 for William Fraser. The third Baronet served with the 7th Hussars in Spain during the Peninsular War, and was on the staff of the Duke of Wellington during the Waterloo Campaign. The fourth Baronet was an author and collector and also represented Barnstaple, Ludlow and Kidderminster in the House of Commons. The fifth Baronet sat as Member of Parliament for Harborough.

The title became extinct on the death of the sixth Baronet in 1979.

== Fraser baronets, of Ledeclune (1806) ==
- Sir William Fraser, 1st Baronet (died 1818)
- Sir William Fraser, 2nd Baronet (1787–1827)
- Sir James John Fraser, 3rd Baronet (died 1834)
- Sir William Augustus Fraser, 4th Baronet (1826–1898)
- Sir Keith Alexander Fraser, 5th Baronet (1867–1935); son of Lieutenant-Colonel James Keith Fraser, C.M.G. 3rd son of the 3rd Baronet.
- Sir Keith Charles Adolphus Fraser, 6th Baronet (1911–1979)

== Notes ==
Baronetage of the United Kingdom
Preceded by Lockhart baronets	Fraser baronets of Ledeclune; 27 November 1806	Succeeded by Nugent baronets
