= James Keith Fraser =

Lieutenant-General James Keith Fraser CMG
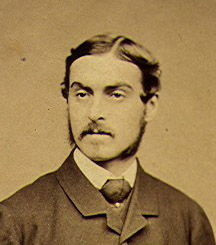
- Born: 20 September 1832
- Died: 30 July 1895 (aged 62)
- Spouse: Amelia Alice Julia Ward (m. 1865; died 1895)
- Relatives: Sir James Fraser (father)
- Military career
- Allegiance: United Kingdom
- Branch: British Army
- Rank: Lieutenant-General
- Unit: 1st Life Guards

Lieutenant-General James Keith Fraser CMG (20 September 1832 – 30 July 1895) was a British Army officer.

== Early life ==
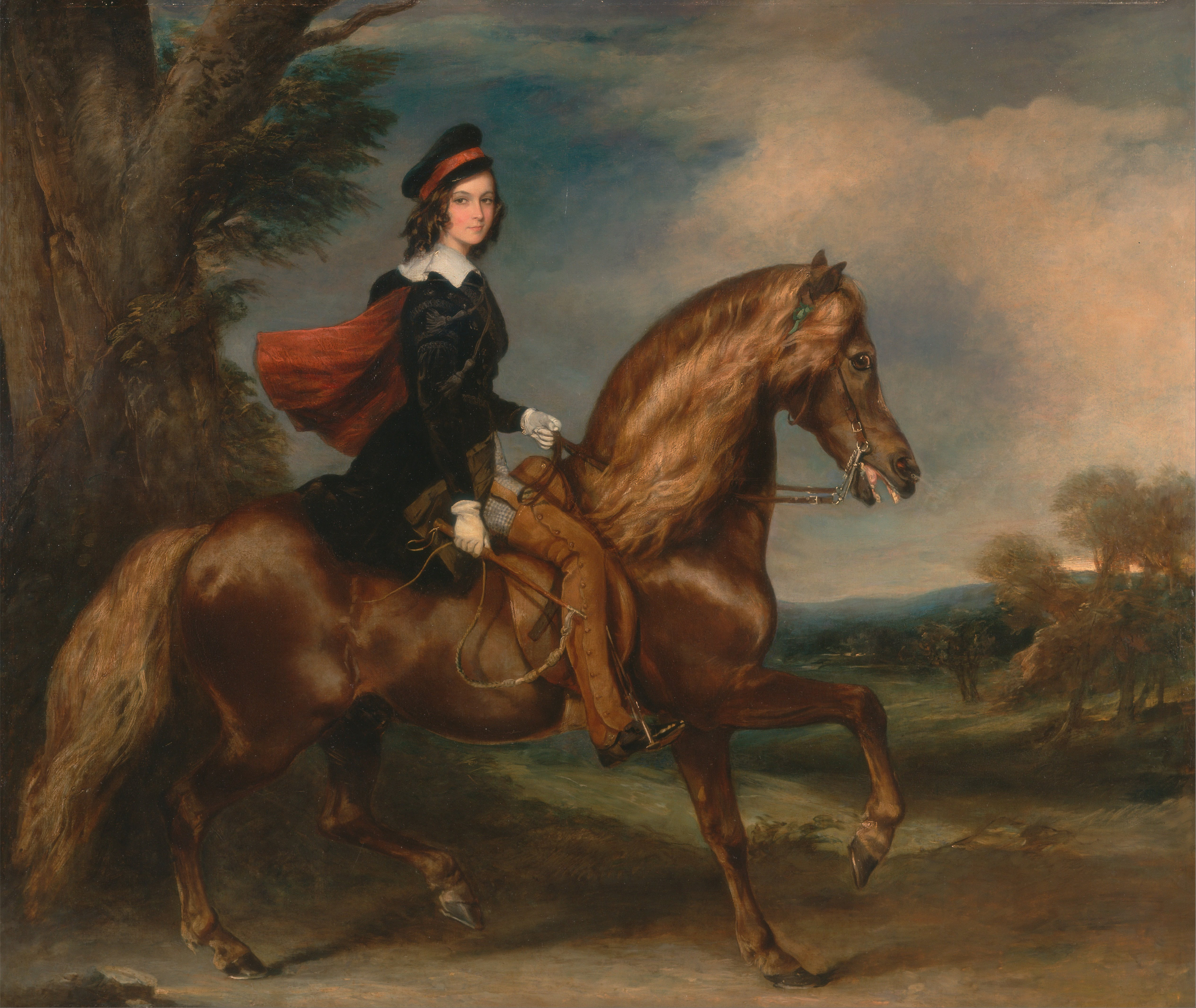
James Keith Fraser on His Pony by Francis Grant, 1844

Fraser was born on 20 September 1832. He was the third son of Lt.-Col. Sir James John Fraser, 3rd Baronet and the former Charlotte Anne Craufurd. He had two elder brothers, Sir William Fraser, 4th Baronet, an MP for Barnstaple, and Lt.-Gen. Sir Charles Craufurd Fraser, aide-de-camp to the Lord Lieutenant of Ireland.

His paternal grandparents were Sir William Fraser, 1st Baronet, and the former Elizabeth Farquharson (a daughter of merchant James Farquharson, of London). His maternal grandparents were Daniel Craufurd (a son of Sir Alexander Craufurd, 1st Baronet) and Bridget Holland (a daughter of architect Henry Holland).

== Career ==
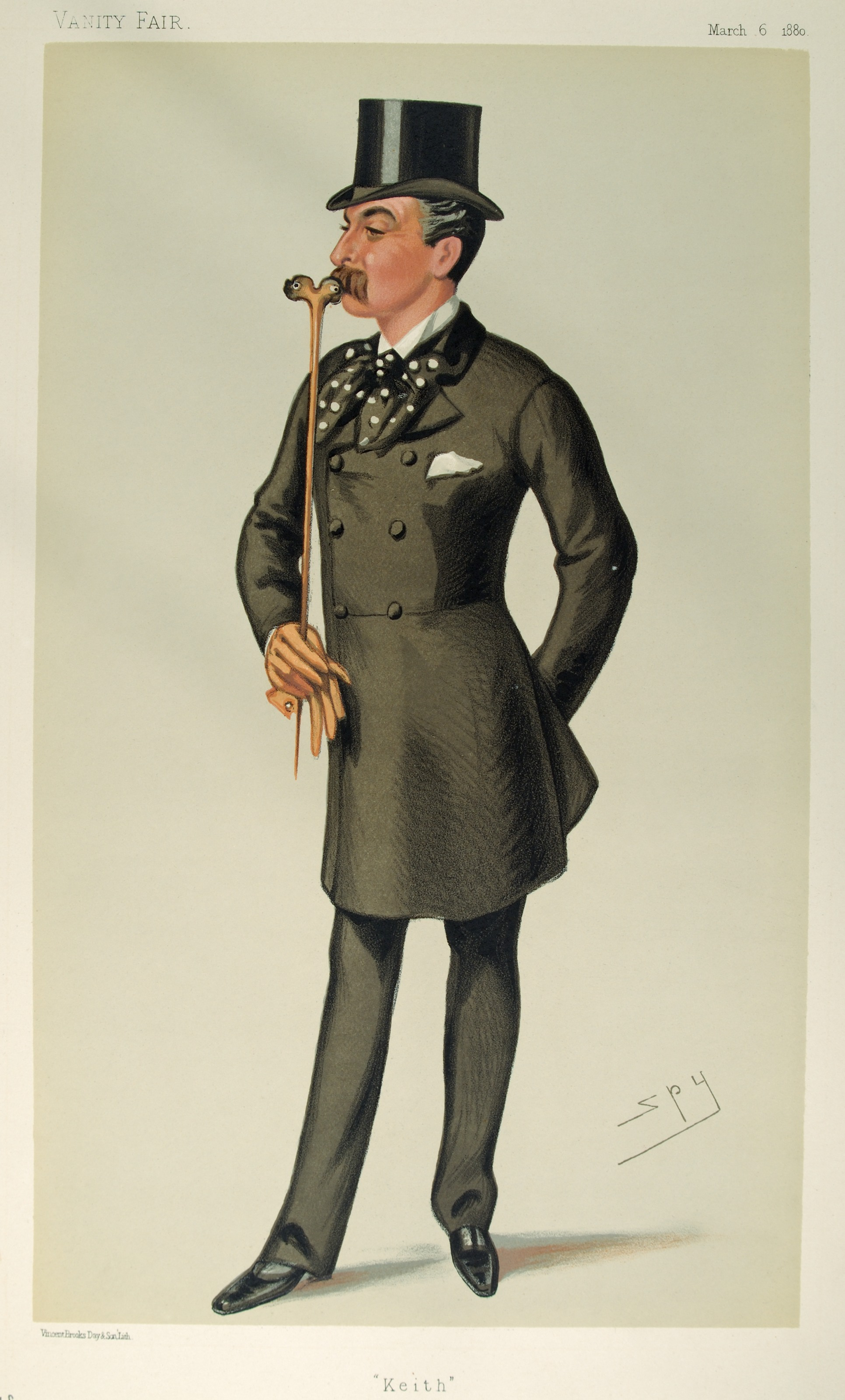
"Keith". Caricature by "Spy" (Leslie Ward) published in Vanity Fair in 1880.

In 1855, he served as military attaché at Vienna. He gained the rank of Colonel in the 1st Life Guards and was Inspector-General of Cavalry in Great Britain and Ireland in 1891.

He was appointed Companion, Order of St. Michael and St. George.

== Personal life ==
On 10 June 1865, Fraser married Amelia Alice Julia Ward (d. 1929), a daughter of Hon. Humble Dudley Ward (a son of the 10th Baron Ward) and Eleanor Louisa Hawkes. Together, they were the parents of:

- Helena Violet Alice Fraser (d. 1949), who married George Rous, 3rd Earl of Stradbroke, a son of John Rous, 2nd Earl of Stradbroke and Augusta Bonham (widow of Col. Henry Frederick Bonham, and the daughter of the Rev. Sir Christopher Musgrave, 9th Bt.) in 1898.
- Sir Keith Alexander Fraser, 5th Baronet (1867–1935), who married Lady Dorothy Coventry, daughter of George Coventry, 9th Earl of Coventry and Lady Blanche Craven (a daughter of the 2nd Earl of Craven), in 1910.
- Capt. Hugh Craufurd Keith-Fraser (1869–1906), who married Dorothy Villiers, a daughter of Rt. Hon. Sir Francis Hyde Villiers (son of the 4th Earl of Clarendon) and Virginia Katharine Smith (daughter of Eric Carrington Smith), in 1919.

Fraser died on 30 July 1895. His son later succeeded to his father's baronetcy in 1898.
