= Raymond Walton =

British Liberal politician and judge

Sir Raymond Henry Walton (9 September 1915 – 29 January 1988), was a British Liberal Party politician and High Court Judge.

== Background ==
The elder son of Henry Herbert Walton and Clara Martha Walton (née Dobrantz), of Dulwich, he was educated at Dulwich College and Balliol College, Oxford where he was Open Scholar and received a BA in 1937 and a MA in 1942. He was President of the Oxford Union in 1938. He married, in 1940, Helen Alexandra Dingwall, eldest daughter of Alexander Dingwall of Jedburgh. They had one son and two daughters. He was knighted in 1973.

== Professional career ==
Called to Bar, Lincoln's Inn, 1939; War service in Anti-Aircraft Artillery (including Instructor in Gunnery and Experimental Officer), 1940–46. Returned to practice at Bar, 1946; QC 1963. Legal corresp., Financial Times, 1953–72. Mem., Lord Chancellor's Law Reform Cttee, 1959–83; Bencher, 1970. Chm., Insolvency Rules Adv. Cttee, 1977–83. Church Comr for England, 1969–73; Dep. Chm., Boundaries Commn for England, 1973–86. Hon. Fellow, Coll. of Estate Management, 1977. He was a Judge of the High Court of Justice, Chancery Division from 1973 to 1987. Editor-in-Chief, Encyclopaedia of Forms and Precedents, 5th edn, 1985–.

== Political career ==
While at Oxford University he joined the University Liberal Club and in 1936 he became Club President. Shortly after becoming President of the Oxford Union in February 1938, at the age of 23, he was selected as Liberal prospective parliamentary candidate for the Gloucestershire division of Thornbury. Although the Liberal Party had won the seat in 1923, by 1931 they had dropped to third place. In August 1939 he switched to become prospective Liberal candidate for Horsham & worthing. The election was expected to take place in autumn 1939 but the outbreak of war meant the election was deferred. After the war, he switched to stand as Liberal candidate for the North Lambeth Division at the 1945 General Election. The Liberals had last won the seat in 1931 and had finished second at the last General election in 1935 when no National government candidate stood. However, in 1945 he was in a three-way fight and came third;

General Election 1945 Electorate 20,233
Party	Candidate	Votes	%	±%
Labour	George Strauss	8,677	66.6	
National Liberal	E.W. Bates	2,624	20.1	
Liberal	Raymond Henry Walton	1,730	13.3	
Majority		6,053	46.5	
Turnout		20,223	64.4	
Labour hold		Swing	N/A	

After the election he concentrated on his legal career and did not stand for parliament again.

== Arms ==
Coat of arms of Raymond Walton

Notes
Walton's arms are displayed in the Great Hall of Lincoln's Inn.
Motto
Qualis Ab Incepto
