= Frederick Horner =

Frederick Horner may refer to:

- John Horner (British politician) (Frederick John Horner, 1911–1997), British firefighter, trade unionist and politician
- Frederick William Horner (1854–?), British playwright, publisher and Conservative politician
