= Frank Briant =

British politician

- Briant in 1924

Member of Parliament for Lambeth North
- In office 1931–1934
- Preceded by: George Strauss
- Succeeded by: George Strauss
- In office 1918–1929
- Preceded by: Sir William Houghton-Gastrell
- Succeeded by: George Strauss

Personal details
- Born: 30 November 1865 Kennington, London
- Died: 1 September 1934 (aged 68) Kennington, London
- Party: Liberal Party

Frank Briant (30 November 1865 – 1 September 1934) was a radical British Liberal Party politician who served as a Member of Parliament for Lambeth North. In addition, he represented Lambeth on the London County Council and was a leading member of Lambeth Borough Council.

== Background ==
He was born in Kennington to William and Susannah Briant. He started work as a civil servant. In 1887, he started working at the Alford House Institute for Workingmen and Lads. In religion, he was a Congregationalist.

== Political career ==
He served for 10 years as Chairman of the Lambeth Board of Guardians. He was a Justice of the peace for London. He was a member of Lambeth Borough Council, the London County Council and the House of Commons. He was first elected to Lambeth Council and was elected Chairman of the Council in 1899, a position he held for twenty years. He was elected as a Progressive Party member to the London County Council in 1905 representing Lambeth North. He served as both a borough and county councillor through to the end of World War I. In 1912, he was selected as the Liberal prospective parliamentary candidate for Lambeth North but due to the outbreak of war; had to wait until the 1918 general election. He was comfortably re-elected to the LCC in 1913 suggesting that he may well have gained the parliamentary seat in a 1915 general election;

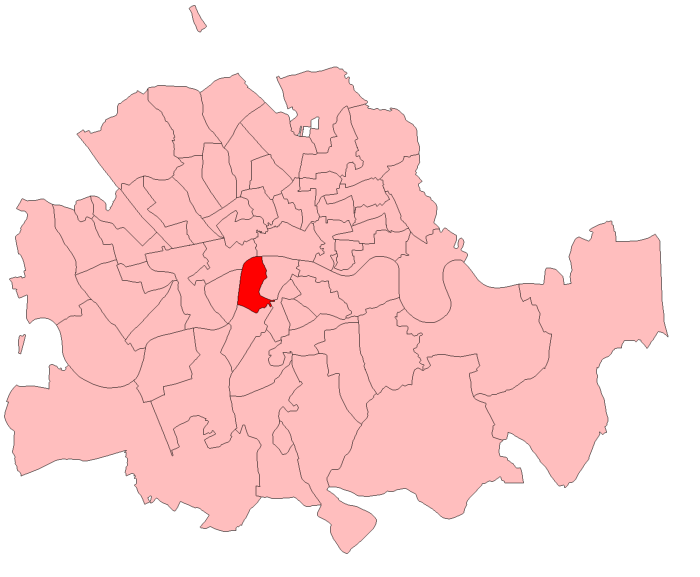
Lambeth North in London County, showing boundaries used 1885–1918

London County Council election, 1913: Lambeth North Electorate 7,582
Party	Candidate	Votes	%	±%
Progressive	✓ Frank Briant	2,370		
Municipal Reform	✓ Louis Courtauld	2,118		
Municipal Reform	W. Gough-Cook	2,105		
Labour	Francis Samuel Smith	2,037		
Majority				
Progressive hold		Swing		
Municipal Reform gain from Labour		Swing		

Despite his Unionist opponent receiving the 'coupon' letter of support from the Coalition Government he gained the seat from the Unionists. His election was one of only a handful of gains made by the Liberals at these elections.

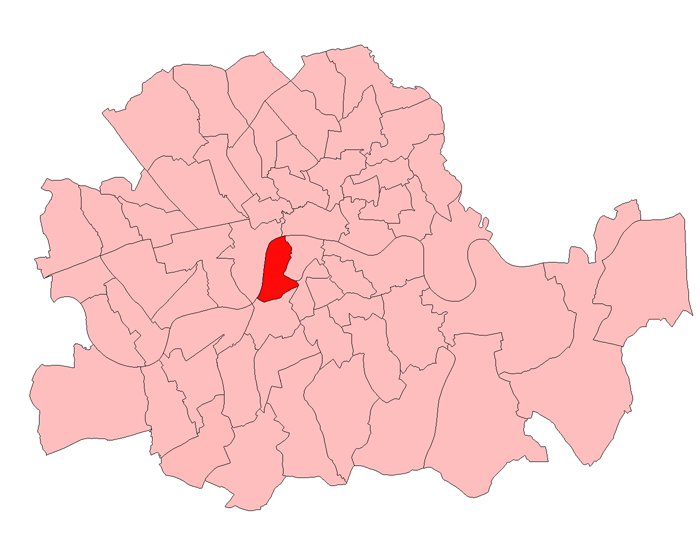
Lambeth North in the County of London 1918–1949

General election 1918: Lambeth North Electorate 28,777
Party	Candidate	Votes	%	±%
Liberal	Frank Briant	7,326	62.3	+15.8
Coalition Conservative	Sir William Henry Houghton Gastrell	4,441	37.7	−15.8
Majority		2,885	24.6	31.6
Turnout			40.9	−32.6
Liberal gain from Conservative		Swing	+15.8	

In 1919, due to the commencement of his parliamentary career, he stood down from the Chairmanship of Lambeth Council, and retired from the London County Council.

He retained his seat in the House of Commons at every subsequent election

General election 1922: Lambeth North Electorate 30,320
Party	Candidate	Votes	%	±%
Liberal	Frank Briant	8,132	43.1	−19.2
Conservative	Ernest Roy Bird	7,362	39.1	+1.4
Labour	Barbara Bodichon Ayrton-Gould	3,353	17.8	n/a
Majority		770	4.0	−20.6
Turnout			62.2	+21.3
Liberal hold		Swing	-10.3	

General election 1923: Lambeth North Electorate 31,146
Party	Candidate	Votes	%	±%
Liberal	Frank Briant	9,036	48.5	+5.4
Conservative	Ernest Roy Bird	5,509	29.6	−9.5
Labour	F. Hughes	4,089	21.9	+4.1
Majority		3,527	18.9	+14.9
Turnout			59.8	−2.4
Liberal hold		Swing	+7.5	

General election 1924: Lambeth North Electorate
Party	Candidate	Votes	%	±%
Liberal	Frank Briant	7,943	37.2	−11.3
Labour	George Russell Strauss	7,914	37.1	+15.2
Conservative	J. Lazarus	5,488	25.7	−3.9
Majority		29	0.1	−18.8
Turnout		31,866	67.0	+7.2
Liberal hold		Swing	-13.3	

During the 1924–29 parliament which was dominated by a Unionist majority, Briant worked closely with a group of radical Liberal MPs that included William Wedgwood Benn, Percy Harris, Joseph Kenworthy and Horace Crawfurd to provide opposition to the government. He lost his seat to Labour in the 1929 General Election

General election 1929: Lambeth North Electorate 38,815
Party	Candidate	Votes	%	±%
Labour	George Russell Strauss	11,264	43.8	+6.7
Liberal	Frank Briant	10,722	41.8	+4.6
Conservative	Clyde Tabor Wilson	3,691	14.4	−11.3
Majority		542	2.0	2.1
Turnout			66.2	−0.8
Labour gain from Liberal		Swing	+1.1	

In 1931 he returned to municipal politics and was re-elected to the London County Council again representing Lambeth North. Later that year he regained his Lambeth North seat in the House of Commons, defeating the Labour candidate at the 1931 General Election

General election 1931: Lambeth North Electorate 38,923
Party	Candidate	Votes	%	±%
Liberal	Frank Briant	16,368	65.1	+23.3
Labour	George Russell Strauss	8,766	34.9	−8.9
Majority		7,602	30.2	32.2
Turnout			64.6	−1.6
Liberal gain from Labour		Swing	+16.1	

He remained a London County Councillor up until the Match 1934 elections. He continued to represent Lambeth North in the House of Commons until his death. He died on 1 September 1934 at the Alford House Institute for Workingmen and Lads of which he had been the superintendent for 47 years.

== See also ==
- List of Liberal Party (UK) MPs

Parliament of the United Kingdom
Preceded by Sir William Houghton-Gastrell	Member of Parliament for Lambeth North; 1918 – 1929	Succeeded by George Strauss
Preceded by George Strauss	Member of Parliament for Lambeth North; 1931 – 1934	Succeeded by George Strauss
