= Horatio Myer =

Horatio Myer

Horatio Myer (7 June 1850 – 1 January 1916) was a British businessman, iron trades manufacturer and later, Liberal politician.

== Family ==
Horatio Myer was born on 7 June 1850 in Bye Street, Hereford. Horatio's father was a German Jewish immigrant, Abraham Myer, who was a pawnbroker, jeweller, silversmith and watchmaker; his mother was Hannah Myer (née Jones): the family lived in Bye Street.

Myer married Esther Joseph on 28 November 1877. They had four sons and by 1891 they were well off enough to have a house in Paddington with a visiting German governess, a cook and a housemaid.

== Career ==
At the age of nineteen Myer went to work in the wool trade. He then moved to London and in 1876 set up a business in Vauxhall producing iron and brass bedsteads, iron cots and bed chairs. By 1914 the company employed over 200 workers. Myer also expanded his business interests over the years to include corn and forage and wine merchandising. The company, Horatio Myer and Co. Ltd., remained privately owned by his and his brothers' descendants until July 2007.

== Politics ==
Politically, Myer may have been influenced by his father, who naturalised as a British citizen and became a town councillor. In 1889 Myer was elected to the London County Council for Kennington and served until 1904. At the general election of 1906, he was elected as Liberal MP for Lambeth North, a Liberal gain from the Unionists. He had won the Liberal nomination against some opposition, including a campaign to have former Liberal MP for Finsbury Central, Dadabhai Naoroji, the first non-white person to sit in the House of Commons, selected as candidate. In fact Naoroji decided to stand in Lambeth North as an independent Liberal but did not split the vote badly enough to cost Myer the seat. Despite heading the poll in Lambeth North in 1906, Myer was unable to hold the seat at the general election of January 1910. This was despite having acquired a reputation for clever electioneering, assistance during the campaign from his former LCC colleague John Burns, by then the MP for Battersea, the first working man to gain full cabinet rank and some disruptive tactics by Liberals at Unionist meetings.

== Policies ==
Myer took an interest in fiscal policy, and was in favour of the taxation of land values. He published a pamphlet on 'Taxation of Landlords’ but it is known that that fiscal reform was an issue taken up by his Conservative opponent in the 1906 election. One of the questions Myer raised early in the new Parliament was the treatment of Zulu prisoners in Natal and whether they were to be forced to work as diamond miners. He was also interested in employment issues, co-authoring a letter to the Times on 4 May 1907 suggesting new ways of reducing unemployment. He was also a supporter of Women's suffrage.

== Jewish interests ==
Myer was prominent in Jewish affairs. He supported the activities of the Jewish Historical Society and was one time warden of Bayswater Synagogue.

== Other appointments ==
At some point after 1901 he was appointed a Justice of the Peace.

== Death ==
Myer died on Saturday 1 January 1916.

Parliament of the United Kingdom
Preceded by Frederick William Horner	Member of Parliament for Lambeth North; 1906 – January 1910	Succeeded by Sir William Houghton-Gastrell
