= James Keith Fraser on His Pony =

1844 painting by Francis Grant

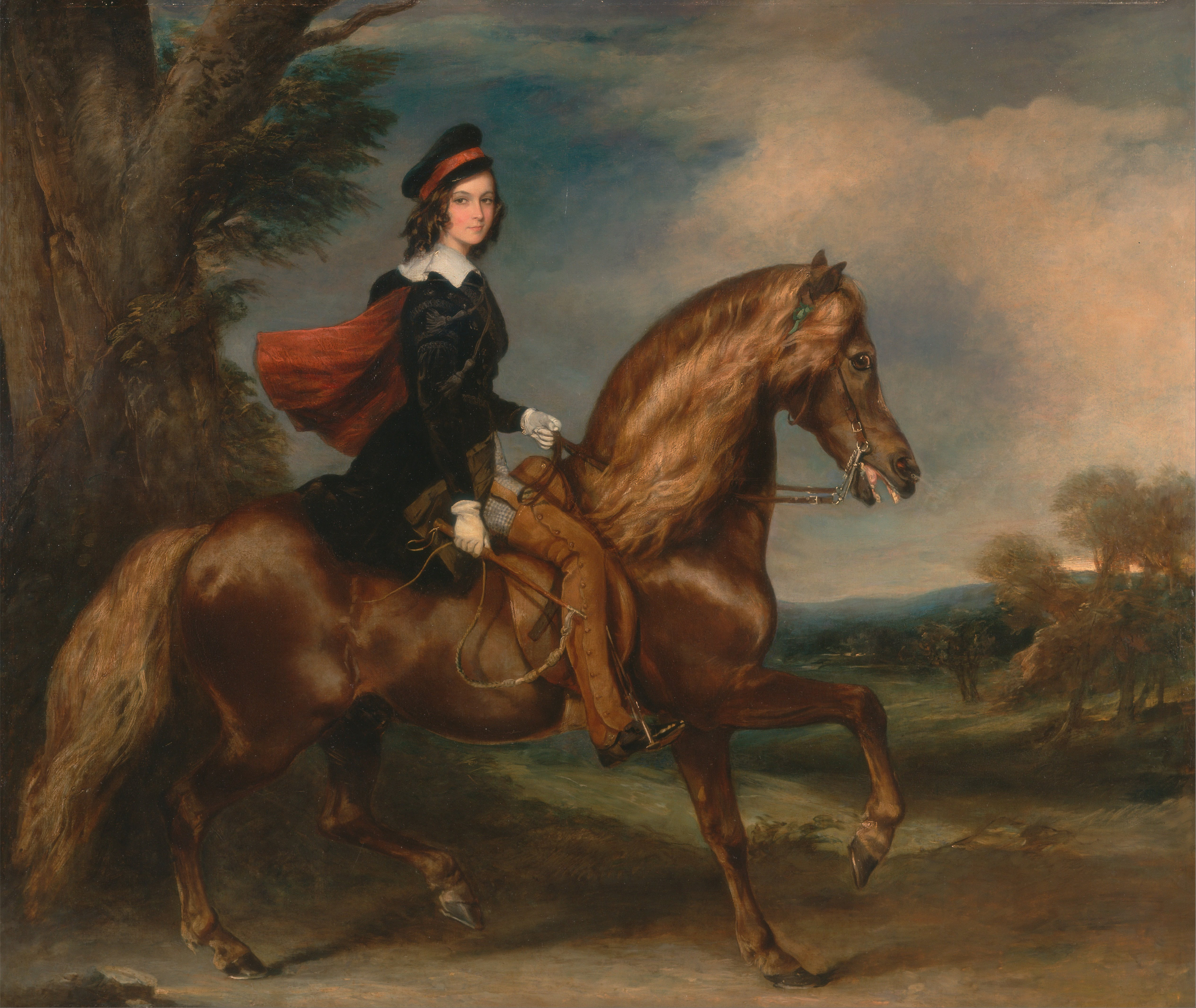
- Artist: Francis Grant
- Year: 1844
- Type: Oil on canvas, portrait painting
- Dimensions: 129.5 cm × 152.4 cm (51.0 in × 60.0 in)
- Location: Yale Center for British Art, Connecticut

James Keith Fraser on His Pony is an 1844 portrait painting by the British artist Francis Grant. It depicts the twelve year old James Keith Fraser, son of Sir James Fraser, on horseback. The equestrian composition was likely inspired by an 1824 portrait Lord Cosmo Russell on His Pony Fingal by Edwin Landseer.

Keith grew up to become an officer in the British Army, eventually rising to rank of Leuitenant General. Grant became a prominent portraitist during the early Victorian era and was later elected as President of the Royal Academy. The painting was displayed at the Royal Academy Exhibition of 1845 held at the National Gallery in London. Today the picture is the Yale Center for British Art in Connecticut, which acquired it as part of the Paul Mellon Collection.

== Bibliography ==
- Lister, Raymond. British Romantic Art. Bell, 1973.
- Maas, Jeremy. Victorian Painters. Barrie & Jenkins, 1978.
- Wills, Catherine. High Society: The Life and Art of Sir Francis Grant, 1803–1878. National Galleries of Scotland, 2003.
