= Lambeth North (UK Parliament constituency) =

Parliamentary constituency in the United Kingdom, 1885–1950

- Former borough constituency for the House of Commons
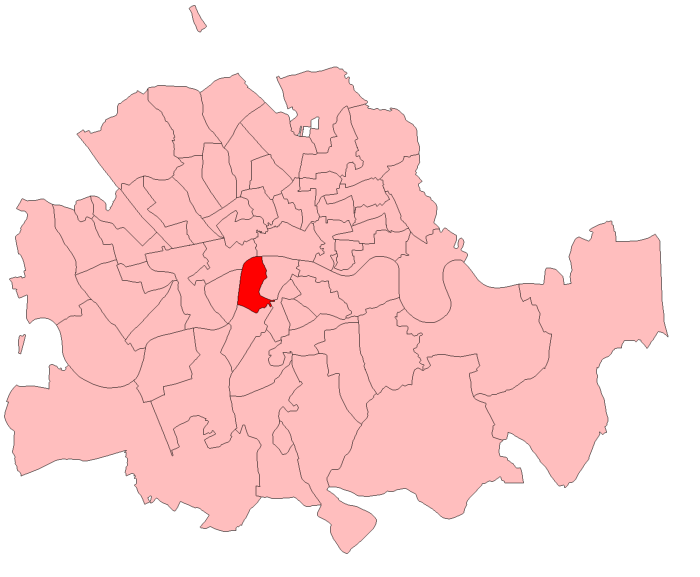
- Lambeth North in London 1885-1918

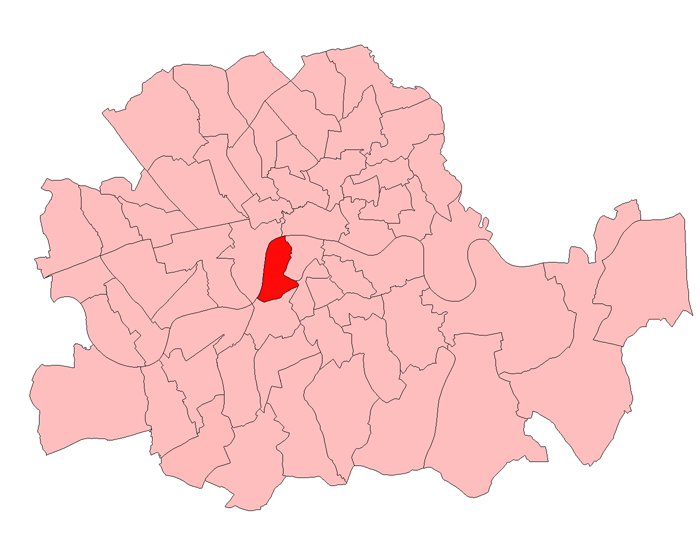
- Lambeth North in London 1918-50
- County: Greater London

1885–1950
- Seats: One
- Created from: Lambeth
- Replaced by: Vauxhall

Lambeth North was a borough constituency centred on the Lambeth district of South London. It returned one Member of Parliament (MP) to the House of Commons of the Parliament of the United Kingdom, elected by the first past the post system.

== History ==

The constituency was created when the two-member Lambeth constituency was divided by the Redistribution of Seats Act 1885 for the 1885 general election. It was abolished for the 1950 general election when the area was absorbed into the Vauxhall constituency.

== Boundaries ==
- 1885 - 1918: The constituency was defined as comprising three wards of the parish of Lambeth: Bishop's, North Marsh and South Marsh. The wards were those used to elect members of the Lambeth Vestry, the local authority established by the Metropolis Management Act 1855.
- 1918 - 1950: The Representation of the People Act 1918 reorganised constituencies in London, defining them in terms of the wards of the Metropolitan Boroughs which had replaced the vestries in 1900. The constituency comprised the following parts of the Metropolitan Borough of Lambeth: Bishop's Ward, Marsh Ward and the part of Prince's Ward that lay "to the north of a line running from Vauxhall Bridge along the middle of Upper Kennington Lane and Lower Kennington Lane to Newington Butts".

== Members of Parliament ==
Election	Member	Party
1885	Sir Charles Craufurd Fraser	Conservative
1892	Francis Coldwells	Liberal
1895	Sir Henry Morton Stanley	Liberal Unionist
1900	Frederick William Horner	Conservative
1906	Horatio Myer	Liberal
Jan 1910	Sir William Houghton-Gastrell	Conservative
1918	Frank Briant	Liberal
1929	George Strauss	Labour
1931	Frank Briant	Liberal
1934 by-election	George Strauss	Labour
1950	constituency abolished	

== Election results ==
=== Elections in the 1880s ===
Walter Wren

General election 1885: Lambeth North
Party	Candidate	Votes	%	±%
Conservative	Charles Fraser	2,524	45.4	
Liberal	Walter Wren	2,346	42.2	
Independent Liberal	James Lawrence	692	12.4	
Majority		178	3.2	
Turnout		5,562	70.1	
Registered electors		7,939		
Conservative win (new seat)				

General election 1886: Lambeth North
Party	Candidate	Votes	%	±%
Conservative	Charles Fraser	2,723	54.1	+8.7
Liberal	Walter Wren	2,311	45.9	+3.7
Majority		412	8.2	+5.0
Turnout		5,034	63.4	−6.7
Registered electors		7,939		
Conservative hold		Swing	+2.5	

=== Elections in the 1890s ===
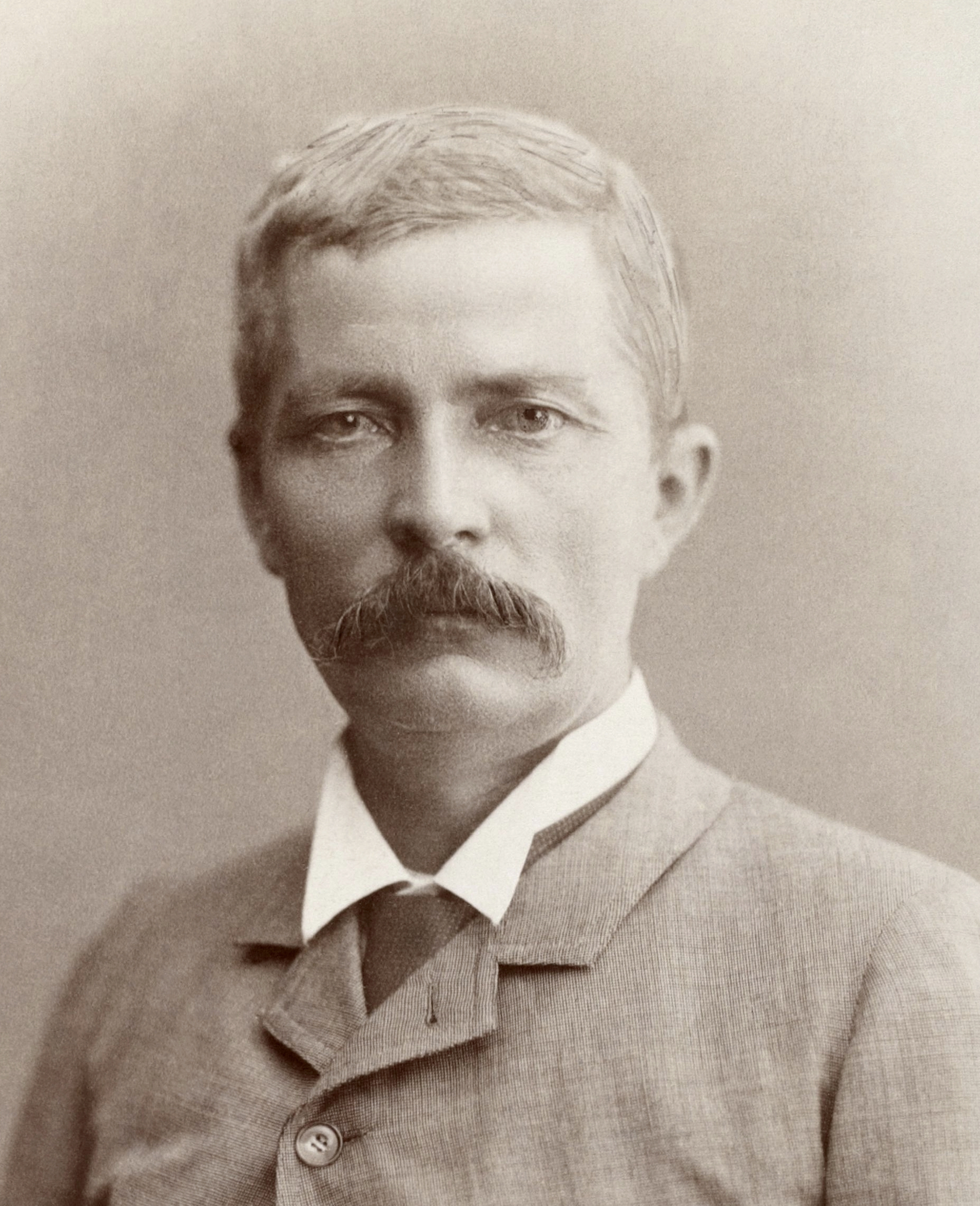
Henry Stanley

General election 1892: Lambeth North
Party	Candidate	Votes	%	±%
Liberal	Francis Coldwells	2,524	51.3	+5.4
Liberal Unionist	Henry Morton Stanley	2,394	48.7	−5.4
Majority		130	2.6	N/A
Turnout		4,918	68.0	+4.6
Registered electors		7,229		
Liberal gain from Conservative		Swing	+5.4	

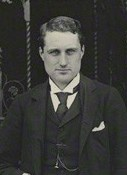
Charles Trevelyan

General election 1895: Lambeth North
Party	Candidate	Votes	%	±%
Liberal Unionist	Henry Morton Stanley	2,878	53.8	+5.1
Liberal	Charles Trevelyan	2,473	46.2	−5.1
Majority		405	7.6	N/A
Turnout		5,351	72.9	+4.9
Registered electors		7,338		
Liberal Unionist gain from Liberal		Swing	+5.1	

=== Elections in the 1900s ===
General election 1900: Lambeth North
Party	Candidate	Votes	%	±%
Conservative	Fred Horner	2,677	59.9	+6.1
Liberal	Charles Ford	1,795	40.1	−6.1
Majority		882	19.8	+12.2
Turnout		4,472	63.1	−9.8
Registered electors		7,090		
Conservative hold		Swing	+6.1	

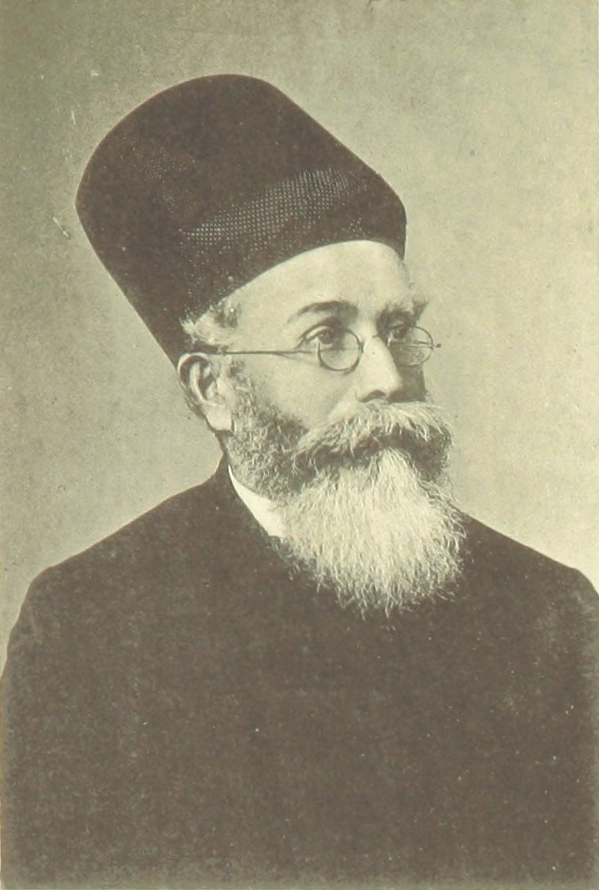
Dadabhai Naoroji

General election 1906: Lambeth North
Party	Candidate	Votes	%	±%
Liberal	Horatio Myer	2,162	44.1	+4.0
Conservative	William Houghton-Gastrell	1,904	38.8	−21.1
London Liberal and Radical Union	Dadabhai Naoroji	733	14.9	New
Ind. Conservative	Fred Horner	108	2.2	New
Majority		258	5.3	N/A
Turnout		4,907	72.1	+9.0
Registered electors		6,802		
Liberal gain from Conservative		Swing	+12.6	

=== Elections in the 1910s ===
Horatio Myer

General election January 1910: Lambeth North
Party	Candidate	Votes	%	±%
Conservative	William Houghton-Gastrell	2,947	55.1	+16.3
Liberal	Horatio Myer	2,397	44.9	+0.8
Majority		550	10.2	N/A
Turnout		5,344	83.0	+10.9
Registered electors		6,440		
Conservative gain from Liberal		Swing	+7.8	

Harry Gosling

General election December 1910: Lambeth North
Party	Candidate	Votes	%	±%
Conservative	William Houghton-Gastrell	2,531	53.5	−1.6
Lib-Lab	Harry Gosling	2,202	46.5	+1.6
Majority		329	7.0	−3.2
Turnout		4,733	73.5	−9.5
Registered electors		6,440		
Conservative hold		Swing	-1.6	

General election 1918: Lambeth North
Party		Candidate	Votes	%	±%
	Liberal	Frank Briant	7,326	62.3	+15.8
C	Unionist	William Houghton-Gastrell	4,441	37.7	−15.8
Majority			2,885	24.6	N/A
Turnout			11,767	40.9	−32.6
	Liberal gain from Unionist		Swing	+15.8	
C indicates candidate endorsed by the coalition government.

=== Elections in the 1920s ===
General election 1922: Lambeth North
Party	Candidate	Votes	%	±%
Liberal	Frank Briant	8,132	43.1	−19.2
Unionist	Ernest Roy Bird	7,362	39.1	+1.4
Labour	Barbara Ayrton-Gould	3,353	17.8	New
Majority		770	4.0	−20.6
Turnout		18,847	62.2	+21.3
Liberal hold		Swing	-10.3	

General election 1923: Lambeth North
Party	Candidate	Votes	%	±%
Liberal	Frank Briant	9,036	48.5	+5.4
Unionist	Ernest Roy Bird	5,509	29.6	−9.5
Labour	Fred Hughes	4,089	21.9	+4.1
Majority		3,527	18.9	+14.9
Turnout		18,634	59.8	−2.4
Liberal hold		Swing	+7.5	

General election 1924: Lambeth North
Party	Candidate	Votes	%	±%
Liberal	Frank Briant	7,943	37.2	−11.3
Labour	George Strauss	7,914	37.1	+15.2
Unionist	Jack Lazarus	5,488	25.7	−3.9
Majority		29	0.1	−18.8
Turnout		21,345	67.0	+7.2
Liberal hold		Swing	-13.3	

General election 1929: Lambeth North
Party	Candidate	Votes	%	±%
Labour	George Strauss	11,264	43.8	+6.7
Liberal	Frank Briant	10,722	41.8	+4.6
Unionist	Clyde Tabor Wilson	3,691	14.4	−11.3
Majority		542	2.0	N/A
Turnout		25,677	66.2	−0.8
Labour gain from Liberal		Swing	+1.1	

=== Elections in the 1930s ===
General election 1931: Lambeth North
Party	Candidate	Votes	%	±%
Liberal	Frank Briant	16,368	65.1	+23.3
Labour	George Strauss	8,766	34.9	−8.9
Majority		7,602	30.2	N/A
Turnout		25,134	64.6	−1.6
Liberal gain from Labour		Swing	+16.1	

1934 Lambeth North by-election
Party	Candidate	Votes	%	±%
Labour	George Strauss	11,281	57.9	+23.0
Liberal	J.W. Simpson	4,968	25.5	−39.6
National Labour	Frank Markham	2,927	15.0	New
Independent	A.S.G. Brown	305	1.6	New
Majority		6,313	32.4	N/A
Turnout		19,481	52.6	−12.0
Labour gain from Liberal		Swing	+31.3	

General election 1935: Lambeth North
Party	Candidate	Votes	%	±%
Labour	George Strauss	10,577	55.4	+20.5
Liberal	Edward Terrell	8,521	44.6	−20.5
Majority		2,056	10.8	N/A
Turnout		19,098	54.2	−10.4
Labour gain from Liberal		Swing	-10.8	

=== Elections in the 1940s ===
General election 1945: Lambeth North
Party	Candidate	Votes	%	±%
Labour	George Strauss	8,677	66.6	+11.2
National Liberal	Eric William Bales	2,624	20.1	New
Liberal	Raymond Henry Walton	1,730	13.3	−31.3
Majority		6,053	46.5	+35.7
Turnout		13,031	64.4	+10.2
Labour hold		Swing		
