= George Stucley =

British politician

Colonel Sir George Stucley Stucley, 1st Baronet DL (17 August 1812 – 13 March 1900), known as George Buck until 1858, was a British Conservative Member of Parliament.

== Life ==
Buck was born in 1812, the son and heir of Lewis William Buck (1784–1858). He inherited the estates of his father in 1858, and in the same year changed his name and assumed by royal licence the name and arms of Stucley in lieu of his patronymic as lineal heir of the ancient Stucley family, which had possessed Affeton Castle in Devon for over 600 years. He thus possessed the paternal Buck estate of Daddon and other lands, the Stucley inheritance of Affeton and other lands and also Hartland Abbey and other lands. In April 1859 he was created a Baronet, of Affeton Castle in the County of Devon. He had a keen interest in family history, heraldry and his ancestors. He redecorated Hartland Abbey and in 1868-9 reconstructed the ruinous Gatehouse at Affeton, the only part of the fortified manor house of the Stucleys which had been left standing since the destruction of the house during the Civil War, which he renamed "Affeton Castle" and used as a shooting lodge for the grouse shooting season on Affeton Moor.

He was educated at Eton College and Christ Church, Oxford, and obtained a commission in the Royal Horse Guards, from which he retired with the rank of lieutenant-colonel. He was afterwards connected to the Devon Artillery Militia, of which he was appointed in command in 1849 and retired with the honorary rank of colonel as the regiment was disbanded in 1853.

As George Buck he unsuccessfully ran for Parliament for the Exeter constituency in 1852, but was elected for Barnstaple in 1855, a seat he held until 1857 and again as George Stucley between 1865 and 1868. In 1863 he served as High Sheriff of Devon, and he was also a Deputy Lieutenant for Devon and Cornwall. For many years he was chairman of the Bideford Board of Guardians, and on the establishment of district and parish councils was elected by the board as a co-opted member.

As patron he made two presentations to the rectory of Bideford, in 1878 (his wife’s cousin Rev. Roger Granville (died 1896), author of History of the Granville Family (lords of the manor of Bideford for many centuries)) and in 1896.

He was known as a keen sportsman and was an active man until a few years before his death. Stucley died at his residence Moreton House, Bideford, on 13 March 1900, aged 87.

== Family ==
Stucley married first in 1835 Lady Elizabeth O'Bryan, 4th daughter and co-heiress of William O'Brien, 2nd Marquess of Thomond (1765–1846), by whom he had children. Lady Elizabeth Stucley died in 1870. He married secondly in 1872 to Louisa Granville, daughter of Sir Beville Granville of Wellesbourne, Warwickshire. Lady Stucley was nearly 30 years his junior and died in 1913. He lived at Hartland Abbey from 1840 to 1870, when following the death of his first wife he handed ownership of Hartland Abbey to his son Lewis. In later years he moved to Exbury House on the Solent, which he rented to pursue his pastime of yacht-sailing.

Children:

- Lt.-Col. Sir William Lewis Stucley, 2nd Baronet (1836–1911), eldest son by his father's first wife, died without children.
- Lewis George Orchart Stucley (1843–1870)
- Sir Edward Arthur George Stucley, 3rd Baronet (1852–1927), died without children.
- Sir Hugh Nicholas Granville Stucley, 4th Baronet (1873–1956)
- Major Humphrey St Leger Stucley (1877–1914)

== Sources ==
- Kidd, Charles, Williamson, David (editors). Debrett's Peerage and Baronetage (1990 edition). New York: St Martin's Press, 1990.
- Leigh Rayment's list of baronets
- Lauder, Rosemary, Devon Families, Tiverton, 2002, Stucley family, pp. 142–150
- Vivian, Lt.Col. J.L., (Ed.) The Visitations of the County of Devon: Comprising the Heralds' Visitations of 1531, 1564 & 1620, Exeter, 1895, Stucley & Buck pedigree, pp. 721–3
- Hansard 1803–2005: contributions in Parliament by Sir George Stucley

Parliament of the United Kingdom
Preceded by John Laurie; Richard Samuel Guinness	Member of Parliament for Barnstaple; 1855–1857; With: Richard Samuel Guinness	Succeeded by Sir William Fraser; John Laurie
Preceded by John Ferguson-Davie; Richard Bremridge	Member of Parliament for Barnstaple; 1865–1868; With: Thomas Cave	Succeeded by Thomas Cave; Charles Henry Williams
Baronetage of the United Kingdom
New creation	Baronet (of Affeton Castle); 1859–1900	Succeeded by William Lewis Stucley
