= 1934 Lambeth North by-election =

UK parliamentary by-election

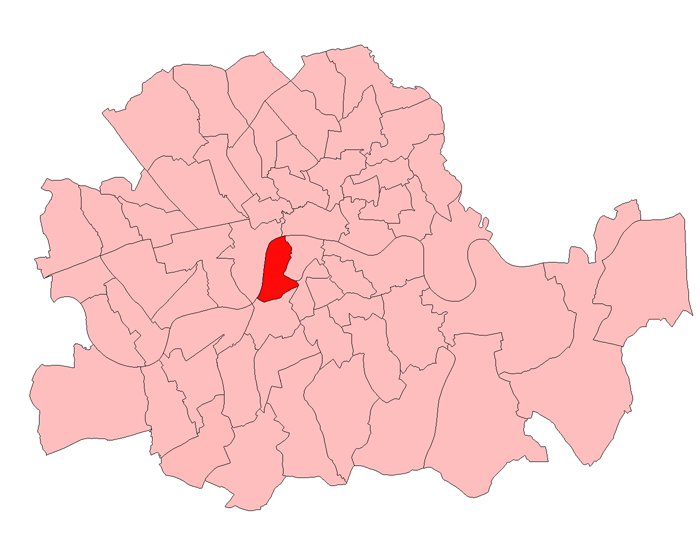
Lambeth North in London 1934

The 1934 Lambeth North by-election was held on 23 October 1934. The by-election was held due to the death of the incumbent Liberal MP, Frank Briant. It was won by the Labour candidate George Strauss who had previously been the MP for Lambeth North but lost it to Briant (who had also previously been an MP for the seat) in the landslide defeat for Labour in 1931.

== Electoral history ==
General election 1931: Lambeth North
Party	Candidate	Votes	%	±%
Liberal	Frank Briant	16,368	65.1	+23.3
Labour	George Strauss	8,766	34.9	−8.9
Majority		7,602	30.2	N/A
Turnout		25,134	64.6	−1.6
Liberal gain from Labour		Swing	+16.1	

== Result ==
Lambeth North by-election, 1934
Party	Candidate	Votes	%	±%
Labour	George Strauss	11,281	57.9	+23.0
Liberal	J. W. Simpson	4,968	25.5	−39.6
National Labour	Frank Markham	2,927	15.0	New
Independent	Alice S.G. Brown	305	1.6	New
Majority		6,313	32.4	N/A
Turnout		19,481	52.6	−12.0
Labour gain from Liberal		Swing	+31.3	
