= Thompson baronets of Hartsbourne Manor (1806) =

The Thompson baronetcy, of Hartsbourne Manor in the County of Hertford, was created in the Baronetage of the United Kingdom on 11 December 1806 for the naval commander Thomas Thompson. He notably commanded HMS Leander at the Battle of the Nile and also sat as Member of Parliament for Rochester.

== Thompson baronets, of Hartsbourne Manor (1806) ==
- Sir Thomas Boulden Thompson, GCB, 1st Baronet (1766–1828)
- Sir Thomas Raikes Trigge Thompson, 2nd Baronet (1804–1865)
- Sir Thomas Raikes Thompson, 3rd Baronet (1852–1904)
- Sir Thomas Raikes Lovett Thompson, MC, 4th Baronet (1881–1964)
- Sir (Thomas) Lionel Tennyson Thompson, 5th Baronet (1921–1999)
- Sir Thomas d'Eyncourt John Thompson, 6th Baronet (born 1956)

The heir apparent to the baronetcy is Thomas Boulden Cameron Thompson (born 2006), only son of the 6th Baronet.

Coat of arms of Thompson of Hartsbourne Manor
Crest Out of a naval crown Or, an arm in armour embowed Proper, garnished Gold, the hand supporting a lance erect also Proper. Escutcheon Per fesse Argent and Sable, a fesse counter-embattled between three falcons jessed and belled, Or, all within a bordure engrailed, and all counterchanged ; in the chief point, also within the bordure, an anchor erect Azure, cable Proper. Motto Non quo sed quomodo

Baronetage of the United Kingdom
Preceded by Nugent baronets	Thompson baronets of Hartsbourne Manor; 11 December 1806	Succeeded by Berry baronets
