= Charles Henry Williams =

British naval and military officer and politician

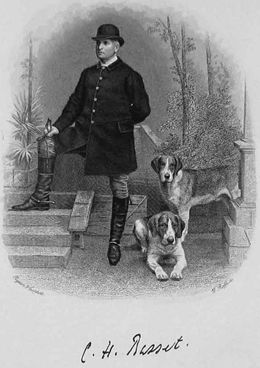
Charles Henry Basset, MSH 1887–1893. Baily's Magazine of Sports & Pastimes, no. 380, October 1891, vol. 56

Charles Henry Williams (later known as Charles Henry Basset, from 1880) (16 November 1834 – 1 February 1908) of Pilton House and Westaway House, Pilton, near Barnstaple, and of Watermouth Castle all in North Devon, was a British naval and military officer, JP and Deputy Lieutenant for Devon, and a Conservative Party politician. He was a Member of Parliament (MP) for Barnstaple, 1868–1874. He was master of the Devon and Somerset Staghounds between 1887 and 1893.

== Origins ==
He was born Charles Henry Williams, on 16 November 1834, being the fourth surviving son of Sir William Williams, 1st Baronet, MFH, of Tregullow, Cornwall, by his wife Caroline Eales, younger daughter of Richard Eales of Eastdon, Lieutenant RN.

In the 1850s his father had purchased the manor of Heanton Punchardon, near Barnstaple, and lived at Heanton Court. This manor had long been owned by the Basset family which had died out in the male line in 1802 on the death of Francis Basset Esq. The latter appointed as his heir his nephew Joseph Davie (1764–1846), of Orleigh Court, in Buckland Brewer parish near Bideford, the son of his sister Eleanora Basset and her husband John Davie. As a condition of his inheritance Joseph Davie adopted the name and arms of Basset. He sold Orleigh in 1807 to Charles Luxmore and moved to Berrynarbor where he built Watermouth Castle. He married Mary Irwin of Barnstaple. A mural monument to the couple exists in Berrynarbor Church. His eldest son and heir was Arthur Davie Bassett (1801 - 8 December 1870), who died in a horse-riding accident. He married Harriet Sarah Crawfurth, daughter of Thomas Smith Crawfurth of Dulverton, by whom he had his eldest surviving son Re. Arthur Crawfurth Davie Bassett (1830–1880), who was unmarried and died at Watermouth. His heir was his sister Harriet Mary Bassett, who became on 7 January 1858 the wife of Charles Henry Williams. The Williams family is memorialised by the Williams Arms public house in the parish of Heanton Punchardon.

Charles Williams himself, following his marriage to the sole heiress of the Davie-Basset family, in accordance with the terms of the inheritance, adopted by royal licence the surname Basset following his wife's inheritance of the Davie-Basset estates from her brother in 1880.

== Career ==
Aged 13 he entered the Navy as cadet on HMS Southampton. He rose to lieutenant and served during the Crimean War in the Black Sea, and Sea of Azof. He was a major in the Royal North Devon Yeomanry. He was master of the Devon and Somerset Staghounds between 1887 and 1893.

== Change of name ==
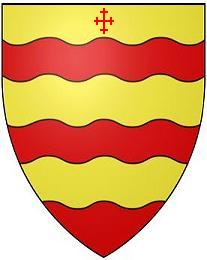
New arms adopted by Charles Henry Bassett by Royal Licence 11 October 1880: Barry wavy of six or and gules in the centre chief point a cross crosslet of the last. These are the ancient arms of Basset, which can be seen on four 17th-century mural monuments in Heanton Punchardon Church, differenced by a cross crosslet

As a condition of his wife's inheritance in 1880, he assumed for himself, his wife and their children by Royal Licence dated 11 October 1880, the surname of Basset in lieu of his patronymic, with the arms of Basset:

"London Gazette, 15 October 1880; Whitehall October 11, 1880

The Queen has been pleased to grant unto Charles Henry Williams of Pilton House, in the parish of Barnstaple, in the county of Devon, Esq., and to Harriet Mary, his wife, elder of the two daughters of Arthur Davie-Basset of Umberleigh, in the parish of Atherington, and Watermouth Castle in the parish of Berrynarbor, both in the county of Devon, and sister and co-heir of Arthur Crawfurth Davie-Basset of Umberleigh and Watermouth Castle aforesaid, a clerk in Holy Orders, all deceased, her Royal Licence and authority that they may take and henceforth use the surname of Bassett only instead of that of Williams, and that he, the said Charles Henry Williams, may bear the arms of Bassett and that such surname and arms may in like manner be taken, borne and used by the issue of their marriage; such arms being first duly exemplified according to the laws of arms and recorded in the College of Arms, otherwise the said Royal Licence and permission to be void and of none effect. And to command that the said Royal concession and declaration be recorded in Her Majesty's said College of Arms".

Armorial bearings: Barry wavy of six or and gules in the centre chief point a cross crosslet of the last Crest: on a wreath of the colours, a unicorn's head couped argent, the mane, beard, and horn or, on the neck two bars indented gules, and charged for distinction with a cross crosslet also gules. Motto: Bene agere ac Laetari. His estates were at Pilton House, Barnstaple; Umberleigh House, Atherington; Watermouth Castle, Berrynarbor, all in Devon.

== Marriage and children ==
He married on 7 January 1878, Harriet Mary Basset, only daughter of Arthur Davie Basset, Esq., of Watermouth Castle, in the parish of Berrynarbor and of Umberleigh House in the parish of Atherington. Harriet was the sister and co-heiress of Reverend Arthur Crawfurth Davie Basset, (1830–1880) JP and MA, of Watermouth Castle. They had the following children:

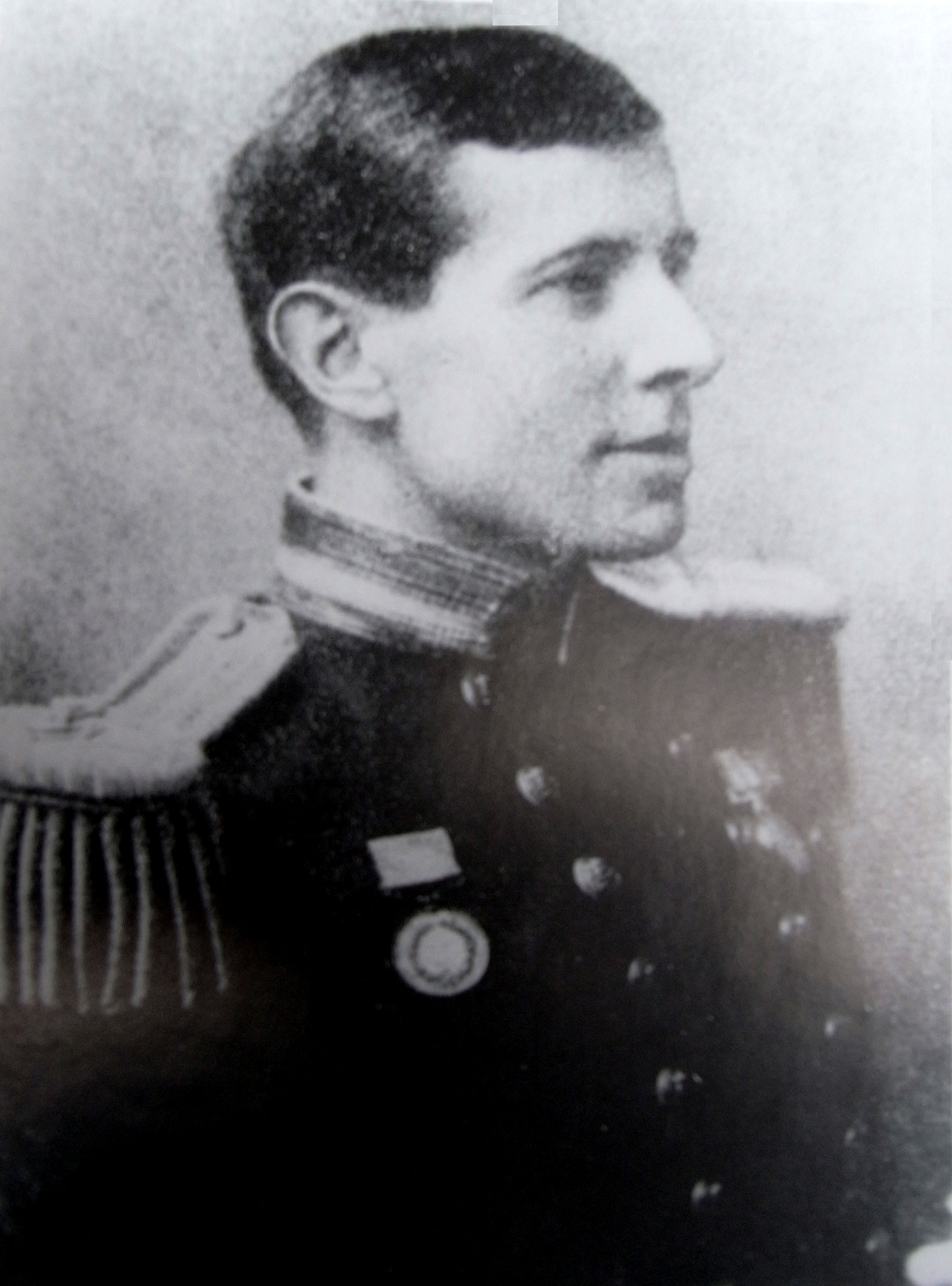
Lt. Walter Basset Bassett (1864-1907), RN, builder of the Wiener Riesenrad

- Walter Basset Bassett (1864–1907), (born Walter Basset Williams), Lieutenant RN, was an engineer who manufactured Ferris wheels. He built the Wiener Riesenrad ("Vienna Giant Wheel") in Vienna in 1897, to celebrate the Golden Jubilee of Emperor Franz Josef I of Austria. Although not the largest at the time of its construction, the demolition of others meant that by 1920 it was the world's tallest extant wheel, a record it held for the next 65 years. It is one of Vienna's most popular tourist attractions. He married on 18 November 1890 Ellen Caroline Charlotte Dowell, daughter of Admiral Sir William Montagu Dowell. They had no children.
- Edith Basset Bassett (1862–1943) (born Edith Basset Williams), married on 18 October 1882 at the Curzon Chapel in Mayfair, London, Captain Ernest Charles Penn Curzon (1856–1938), son of Col. Hon. Ernest George Curzon, son of Richard William Penn Curzon-Howe, 1st Earl Howe. She was appointed a CBE in 1918. They had one son and two daughters. Following her brother's death in 1907, she inherited from him all the Bassett estates. During World War I she started to sell off the ancient Basset estates, including Umberleigh House and manor in 1917 to her tenant of the adjoining Umberleigh Barton since 1840, the Andrew family. Watermouth Castle had been used as a military hospital during WW I, and in the 1920s she started to sell the Berrynarbor farms and cottages. In 1942 she sold most of the contents of the Castle. In 2012 her portrait still hangs in Manor Hall (the Village Hall), Berrynarbor.

Parliament of the United Kingdom
Preceded by Sir George Stucley, Bt; Thomas Cave	Member of Parliament for Barnstaple; 1868 – 1874; With: Thomas Cave	Succeeded by Samuel Danks Waddy; Thomas Cave
