= 1874 Kidderminster by-election =

UK Parliamentary by-election

The 1874 Kidderminster by-election was fought on 31 July 1874. The by-election was fought due to the void Election of the incumbent Conservative MP, Albert Grant. It was won by the Conservative candidate Sir William Fraser.
