= Sir Keith Fraser, 5th Baronet =

British baronet and politician

Major Sir Keith Fraser, Bt JP DL

Member of Parliament for Harborough
- In office 1918–1923
- Preceded by: Percy Harris
- Succeeded by: John Wycliffe Black

Personal details
- Born: Keith Alexander Fraser; 24 December 1867
- Died: 21 September 1935 (aged 67) Carlton Curlieu Hall, Carlton Curlieu, Leicestershire
- Party: Conservative
- Spouse: Lady Dorothy Coventry (m. 1910; died 1935)
- Relations: James John Fraser (grandfather)
- Children: Sir Keith Fraser, 6th Baronet
- Parent(s): James Keith Fraser; Amelia Alice Julia Ward
- Education: Eton College

Major Sir Keith Alexander Fraser, 5th Baronet JP DL (24 December 1867 – 21 September 1935) was a British cavalry officer, and a Conservative Member of Parliament for Harborough from 1918 until 1923. He was also a breeder and trainer of racehorses.

== Early life ==
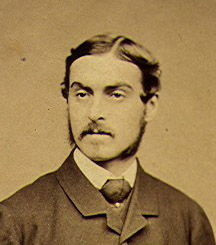
Photograph of his father, James Keith Fraser

Keith Fraser was born on 24 December 1867. He was the eldest son of Gen. James Keith Fraser and Amelia Alice Julia Ward. His sister, Helena Violet Alice Fraser, was the wife of George Rous, 3rd Earl of Stradbroke, and his younger brother, Hugh Craufurd Keith-Fraser, married Dorothy Villiers (a daughter of the Rt. Hon. Sir Francis Hyde Villiers).

His father was the third son of Sir James John Fraser, 3rd Baronet, and the former Charlotte Anne Craufurd (a granddaughter of Sir Alexander Craufurd, 1st Baronet). His maternal grandparents were the Hon. Humble Dudley Ward (a younger son of the 10th Baron Ward) and the former Eleanor Louisa Hawkes (a daughter of Thomas Hawkes, MP for Dudley).

He was educated at Eton.

== Career ==
Fraser joined the 7th Queen's Own Hussars and as a captain saw active service with his regiment in Southern Africa. He fought in the First Matabele War (in what is now Zimbabwe) and was awarded the British South Africa Company Medal in 1893. He also saw action in the Second Matabele War and was awarded the clasp in 1897.

Fraser succeeded his cousin Sir William Augustus Fraser, 4th Baronet to the title of baronet in 1898. He contested the Parliamentary seat of Caithness-shire in 1906, and the Bosworth division of Leicestershire in January 1910. He was Conservative Member of Parliament for Harborough from 1918 until 1923.

=== Horse breeding and training ===
Fraser was a friend of Baden Powell and presented the Fraser Shield to the Boy Scouts in 1912 and the Fraser Shield Camping Competition is now thought by the organisers to be the longest running camping competition in Scouting. Fraser was a "famous breeder and trainer of racehorses under both National Hunt and Jockey Club Rules." Together with his wife, he trained Ardeen, who won the Scottish Grand National and the Grand Sefton Chase at Liverpool, and bred Totaig, who won the Royal Hunt Cup at Ascot in 1932.

== Personal life ==
On 30 August 1910, Fraser married Lady Dorothy Coventry (1872–1965), a daughter of George Coventry, 9th Earl of Coventry and the former Lady Blanche Craven (a daughter of the 2nd Earl of Craven). Together, they were the parents of:

- Keith Charles Adolphus Fraser (1911–1979), who married Blanca de Undurraga y Sandiford, daughter of Don Julio de Undurraga, in 1934. They divorced in 1946; she married Duncan Grinnell-Milne and he married Sybil Ivy Savage, a daughter of George Savage, in 1947.

Sir Keith died of a heart attack at his home, Carlton Curlieu Hall, Carlton Curlieu, Leicestershire, on 21 September 1935. He was succeeded in the baronetcy by his only son, Keith.

== See also ==
- Fraser baronets

== Notes ==
Parliament of the United Kingdom
Preceded by Percy Harris	Member of Parliament for Harborough; 1918–1923	Succeeded by John Wycliffe Black
Baronetage of the United Kingdom
Preceded by William Fraser	Baronet (of Ledeclune); 1898–1935	Succeeded by Keith Fraser
