= James John Fraser =

Lieutenant-Colonel Sir James Fraser, Bt

Personal details
- Born: James John Fraser; 1789
- Died: 5 June 1834 (aged 44–45) Uddens House, Dorsetshire
- Spouse: Charlotte Anne Craufurd (died 1834)
- Parent(s): Sir William Fraser, 1st Baronet; Elizabeth Farquharson

Military service
- Allegiance: United Kingdom
- Branch/service: British Army
- Rank: Lieutenant-Colonel
- Unit: 7th Hussars
- Battles/wars: Peninsular War; Waterloo Campaign

Lieutenant-Colonel Sir James John Fraser, 3rd Baronet (1789 – 5 June 1834) was a lieutenant-colonel in the British Army (1828).

== Early life ==
Fraser, who was born in 1789, was the second son of Sir William Fraser, 1st Baronet, F.R.S., and Elizabeth Farquharson (a daughter of merchant James Farquharson, of London).

He was descended from Alexander Fraser, second son of Hugh Fraser, 1st Lord Lovat.

== Career ==
On the death of his brother Sir William Fraser, 2nd Baronet, on 23 December 1827, he succeeded to the baronetcy which had been created in the Baronetage of the United Kingdom for his father in 1806.

Fraser served with the 7th Hussars in Spain during the Peninsular War, and was on the staff of the Duke of Wellington during the Waterloo Campaign.

== Personal life ==
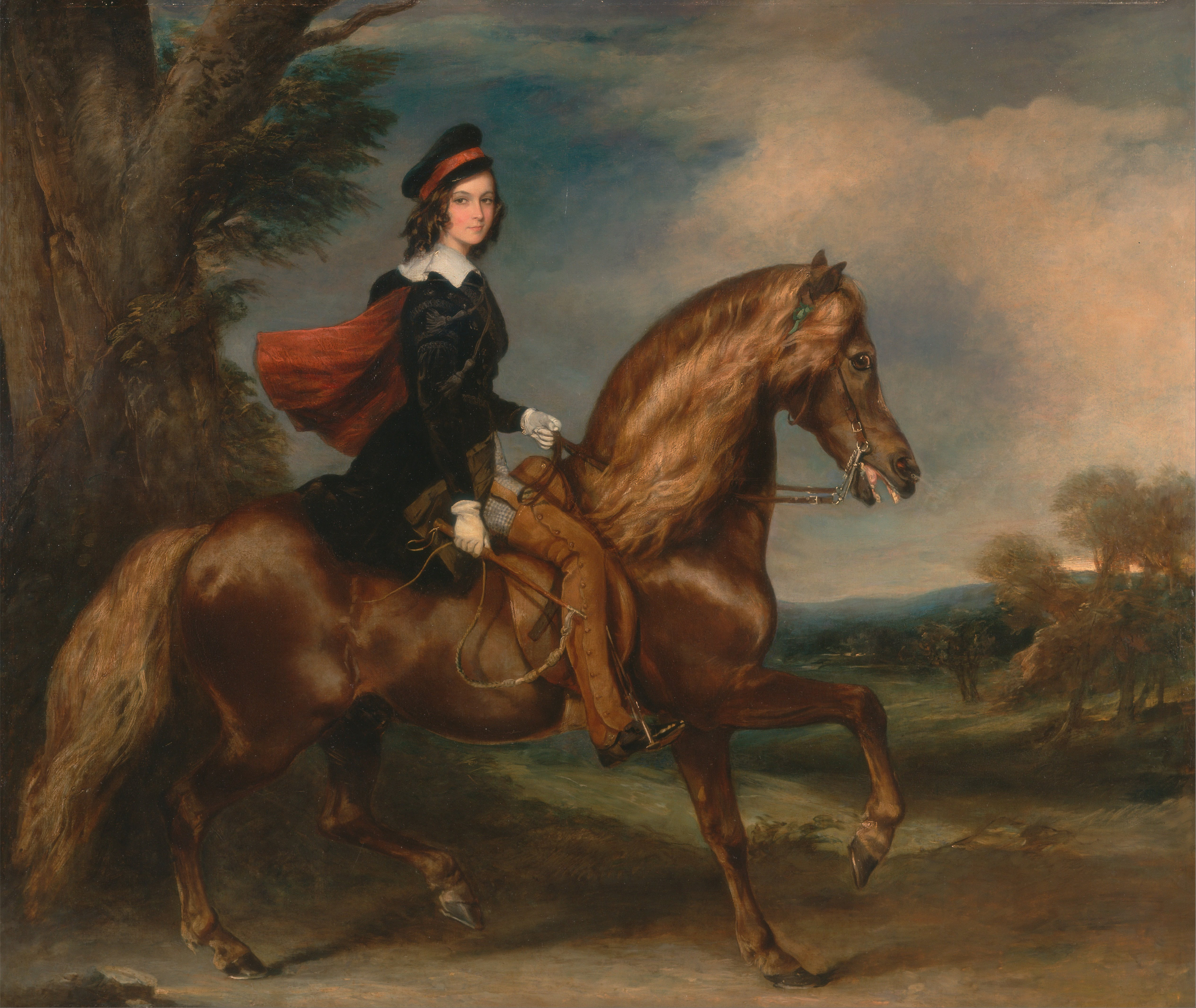
James Keith Fraser on His Pony by Francis Grant, 1844.

Fraser was married to Charlotte Anne Craufurd (d. 1867), a daughter of Daniel Craufurd (a son of Sir Alexander Craufurd, 1st Baronet) and Bridget Holland (a daughter of Henry Holland). Together, they were the parents of:

- Sir William Fraser, 4th Baronet (1826–1898), graduated B.A. and M.A. at Christ Church, Oxford, and in 1847 was appointed an officer in the 1st Life Guards, and subsequently captain; he was MP for Barnstaple in 1852 and 1857; he died unmarried.
- Lt.-Gen. Sir Charles Craufurd Fraser (1829–1895), who was aide-de-camp to the Lord Lieutenant of Ireland; he died unmarried.
- Lt.-Gen. James Keith Fraser (1832–1895), the Inspector-General of Cavalry in Great Britain and Ireland who married Amelia Ward, daughter of Hon. Humble Dudley Ward (son of the 10th Baron Ward), in 1865.

He died on 5 June 1834, at his seat, Uddens House, Dorsetshire, after a short illness, aged 45, leaving a widow and three sons. There are memorial inscriptions to Fraser in All Saints' Church, Langton Long Blandford, at Wimborne Minster, Dorset and on the family memorial tablet in Boleskine Old Churchyard, Drumtemple, Inverness-shire. After his death, his widow married Sir Ralph Howard, 1st Baronet, in July 1837.

=== Descendants ===
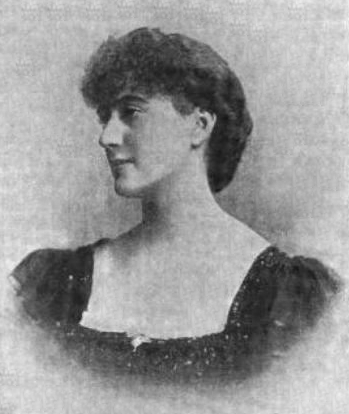
Photograph of his granddaughter, Helena, Countess of Stadbroke (née Helena Violet Alice Fraser), 1902

Through his youngest son James, he was a grandfather of Helena Violet Alice Fraser (who married George Rous, 3rd Earl of Stradbroke), Sir Keith Fraser, 5th Baronet (who married Lady Dorothy Coventry, a daughter of the 9th Earl of Coventry), and Capt. Hugh Craufurd Keith-Fraser (who married Dorothy Villiers, a daughter of Rt. Hon. Sir Francis Hyde Villiers).

Baronetage of the United Kingdom
| Preceded by William Fraser | Baronet (of Ledeclune); 1827–1834 | Succeeded by William Fraser |
