= Nugent baronets of Waddesdon (1806) =

Nugent Baronetcy, of Waddesdon
- Arms of the Nugent baronets of Waddesdon
- Creation date: 28 November 1806
- Baronetage: Baronetage of the United Kingdom
- Status: Extant

The Nugent baronetcy, of Waddesdon in the County of Berks, was created in the Baronetage of the United Kingdom on 28 November 1806 for Field Marshal Sir George Nugent. He was the illegitimate son of the Honourable Edmund Nugent, only son of The 1st Earl Nugent (see Earl Nugent). The 1st Baron Nugent was the younger brother of the fourth Baronet.

== Nugent Baronets, of Waddesdon (1806) ==
- Field Marshal Sir George Nugent, 1st Baronet, GCB, (1757–1849)
- Sir George Edmund Nugent, 2nd Baronet (1802–1892)
- Sir Edmund Charles Nugent, 3rd Baronet (1839–1928)
- Sir (George) Guy Bulwer Nugent, 4th Baronet (1892–1970)
- Sir Robin George Colborne Nugent, 5th Baronet (1925–2006)
- Sir Christopher George Ridley Nugent, 6th Baronet (born 1949)

The heir apparent the present holder's son Terence Nugent (born 1986).

== Notes ==
Baronetage of the United Kingdom
Preceded by Fraser baronets	Nugent baronets of Waddesdon; 28 November 1806	Succeeded by Thompson baronets
