= George Potts =

Member of Parliament for Barnstaple
- In office 30 April 1859 – 20 September 1863 Serving with John Ferguson Davie
- Preceded by: John Laurie; William Fraser
- Succeeded by: John Ferguson Davie; Thomas Lloyd

Personal details
- Born: 1807
- Died: 20 September 1863 (aged 56)
- Party: Liberal
- Other political affiliations: Conservative (Peelite)
- Spouse(s): Three, including Ellen Reed (m. 1847)
- Children: Two
- Parent(s): William Potts; Mary Bayly

George Potts (1807 – 20 September 1863) was a British Liberal and Conservative politician.

Potts was the son of William Potts and Mary (née Bayly), daughter of William Bayly. He married three times, including to his cousin Ellen ńee Reed, daughter of James Reed, in 1847. He had at least two sons including Dr Walter Jeffery Potts (1837–1898), who married Julia Beevor and had at least one son, Charles Herbert Beevor-Potts (1864–1953), a leading magistrate in Nanaimo, Vancouver Island, Canada.

Potts first stood for election at Barnstaple at the 1857 general election as a Peelite Conservative—or Liberal Conservative—but was unsuccessful. He again stood for the seat at the next general election in 1859, joining the Liberal Party after its formation, and held the seat until his death in 1863.

Parliament of the United Kingdom
Preceded by John Laurie; William Fraser	Member of Parliament for Barnstaple; 1859–1863; With: John Ferguson Davie	Succeeded by John Ferguson Davie; Thomas Lloyd
