= Thomas Lloyd (1814–1890) =

British Liberal Party politician

Member of Parliament for Barnstaple
- In office 20 October 1863 – 15 April 1864 Serving with John Ferguson Davie
- Preceded by: John Ferguson Davie; George Potts
- Succeeded by: John Ferguson Davie; Richard Bremridge

Personal details
- Born: 1814
- Died: 23 January 1890 (aged 75)
- Party: Liberal

Thomas Lloyd (1814 – 23 January 1890) was a British Liberal politician.

He served on the Birmingham council from 1855 to 1865, during which time he was an alderman (1856-1865) and mayor (1859). He resigned in 1865 to take up his directorship at Lloyds Bank.

Lloyd was elected MP for Barnstaple at a by-election in October 1863, but was unseated in April 1864 due to bribery. Lloyd stood for election in 1868 at Bewdley but lost in an election which was also marred with bribery.

Parliament of the United Kingdom
Preceded by John Ferguson Davie; George Potts	Member of Parliament for Barnstaple; 1863 – 1864; With: John Ferguson Davie	Succeeded by John Ferguson Davie; Richard Bremridge
