= John Fortescue (MP for Barnstaple) =

British Whig politician

The Honourable John William Fortescue (14 July 1819 – 25 September 1859) was a British Whig politician.

== Background ==
Fortescue was the second son of Hugh Fortescue, 2nd Earl Fortescue, and Lady Susan, daughter of Dudley Ryder, 1st Earl of Harrowby. His paternal grandmother Hester Grenville was the daughter of George Grenville. Hugh Fortescue, 3rd Earl Fortescue and the Hon. Dudley Fortescue were his brothers.

== Political career ==
Fortescue was returned to Parliament as one of two representatives for Barnstaple in 1847, a seat he held until 1852. He was also a Major and later Lieutenant-Colonel commanding the East Devon Militia from 1853 to 1856.

== Personal life ==
Fortescue died in September 1859, aged 40. He never married.

Parliament of the United Kingdom
Preceded by Frederick Hodgson; Montague Gore	Member of Parliament for Barnstaple; 1847–1852; With: Richard Bremridge	Succeeded by Richard Bremridge; Sir William Fraser, Bt
