= Francis Coldwells =

Francis Moses Coldwells (1832 – 29 July 1895) was a British businessman and Liberal Party politician.

Born in Stoke Newington, he was educated in the British School there. At one time he occupied the office of harbourmaster at Brading, Isle of Wight before moving to Croydon in the southern suburbs of London where he established a tailoring business. Elected to Croydon Local Board, he was one of the main proponents of the incorporation of Croydon as a borough, and was one of the first members of the town council, elected an alderman, following the granting of a charter in 1883. He was subsequently a justice of the peace for the borough. He was also a member of Croydon School Board. He was also a temperance activist as a leading member of the Band of Hope.

At the 1892 general election he was elected to the House of Commons as Member of Parliament for Lambeth North, with a majority over his Liberal Unionist opponent, Henry Morton Stanley, of 130 votes.

Coldwells was a director of the Liberator Building Society, established by Jabez Balfour, the first Mayor of Croydon. After the collapse of the company Coldwells was pursued through the courts for large sums of money by some of the society's shareholders. He described himself as being "slowly killed with worry", and did not defend his parliamentary seat at the next election in 1895. Shortly before his death it became clear he faced a criminal trial at the High Court.

He was found dead in a summer house in Bournemouth shortly after leaving parliament. At the inquest into his death it was found that he died from heart failure, possibly aggravated by stress.

Parliament of the United Kingdom
Preceded by Charles Craufurd Fraser	Member of Parliament for Lambeth North; 1892 – 1895	Succeeded by Henry Morton Stanley
