= Frederick William Horner =

British politician

Frederick William Horner (12 December 1854 – 5 June 1933) was a British playwright, publisher and Conservative politician.

Born in Newport, Monmouthshire, he was educated privately. He was active in local politics as a member of the vestry or local authority for the central London parish of St Martin in the Fields, and he assumed the pen name of "Martyn Field". Among his plays were The Late Lamented, The Bungalow and The Other Fellow.

In 1896, Horner purchased the Whitehall Review, becoming its editor-proprietor.

== Member of Parliament ==
Horner was a member of the executive and finance committees and of the council of the National Union of Conservative and Unionist Associations, and at the 1895 general election was an unsuccessful candidate for the constituency of Southwark West. At the next so-called "khaki" election in 1900, held at the height of the Second Anglo-Boer War, he won the seat of Lambeth North, a seat previously held by the Liberal Party.

Horner's single term in parliament was mired in financial scandal: at the end of 1900 Horner formed Mayfair Printing & Publishing Limited, a company to which he assigned the copyright and goodwill of the Whitehall Review. In 1902 and 1903 Henry Labouchère, Liberal MP for Northampton alleged that Horner had obtained cash or credit from a number of hotels on the Continent using company cheques which were not honoured by the bank. In November 1905 Labouchère published further allegations in his periodical Truth. These detailed five more dishonoured company cheques cashed by Horner in Monaco, France and Switzerland, totalling in excess of 500 pounds. Horner launched libel proceedings against the magazine without success.

By the time of the general election called in January 1906, he had been disowned by the Conservative Party, who nominated another candidate for his Lambeth North seat. Horner defended his seat as an Independent Unionist, but secured only 108 votes, finishing last of the four candidates.

== Bankruptcy and imprisonment ==
In February 1906, liquidators were appointed to Mayfair Printing & Publishing Limited. Horner claimed to have resigned as a director of the company some time before, but it became clear that he had made a number of financial transactions on behalf of the company for which no proper accounts had been made. In July 1906 Horner failed to attend a bankruptcy hearing, his medical witness stating that he was "confined to his bed, suffering from complete mental prostration". Despite repeated adjournments, by the end of the year he had been judged bankrupt.

In February 1910 Horner was charged with unlawfully forging and uttering telegrams. The alleged offence had been committed during the election campaign in the previous month. Horner had sent a telegram to the editor of the Daily Mail, impersonating one of its regular correspondents. He claimed to have witnessed the Liberal leader, David Lloyd George, being assailed by an angry group of voters in Falmouth, Cornwall. He detailed how they accused Lloyd George of cowardice and how he had to be rescued from the scene by police. The Daily Mail duly printed the story, but later retracted it. Horner attempted to send another telegram repeating the allegations and stating that "foreigners" were trying to suppress the truth. On 11 March, he was found guilty by a jury and sentenced to six weeks' imprisonment.

Parliament of the United Kingdom
Preceded by Sir Henry Morton Stanley	Member of Parliament for Lambeth North; 1900 – 1906	Succeeded by Horatio Myer
