= Richard Bremridge =

British politician

Richard Bremridge MP

Member of Parliament for Barnstaple
- In office 15 April 1864 – 12 July 1865 Serving with John Ferguson Davie
- Preceded by: Thomas Lloyd; John Ferguson Davie
- Succeeded by: George Stucley; Thomas Cave
- In office 29 July 1847 – 21 April 1853 Serving with William Fraser (1852–1853); John Fortescue (1847–1852)
- Preceded by: Frederick Hodgson; William Fraser
- Succeeded by: George Stucley; Thomas Cave

Personal details
- Born: 1803
- Died: 15 June 1878 (aged 74)
- Party: Conservative

Richard Bremridge (1803 – 15 June 1878) was a British Conservative politician.

Bremridge was first elected MP for Barnstaple in 1847. He was re-elected in 1852, but this vote was overturned in 1853 due to bribery, and the writ for the seat was suspended. He then became MP again in 1864, after a by-election in 1863 was overturned, but did not stand for re-election at the next election in 1865.

Parliament of the United Kingdom
Preceded by Thomas Lloyd; John Ferguson Davie	Member of Parliament for Barnstaple; 1864 – 1865; With: John Ferguson Davie	Succeeded by George Stucley; Thomas Cave
Preceded by Frederick Hodgson; William Fraser	Member of Parliament for Barnstaple; 1847 – 1853; With: William Fraser (1852–1853); John Fortescue (1847–1852)	Succeeded by George Stucley; Thomas Cave
