= Thomas Cave (Liberal politician) =

British politician

Thomas Cave (16 October 1825 – 2 November 1894) was a British Liberal politician.

== Political career ==
Cave was returned to Parliament for Barnstaple in 1865, a seat he held until 1880. He also served as Sheriff of London between 1863 and 1864 and was a Justice of the Peace for Surrey.

== Family ==
Cave married Elizabeth, daughter of Jasper Shallcrass, in 1849. They had five sons, including Lord Chancellor George Cave, 1st Viscount Cave and Basil Cave, Consul-General in Zanzibar and Algiers, and five daughters, one of whom, Harriett, married the businessman and philanthropist Max Waechter. Cave died in Brighton on 2 November 1894, aged 69. Elizabeth survived him by over 30 years and died in November 1925.

== Sources ==
- Leigh Rayment's Historical List of MPs

Parliament of the United Kingdom
Preceded by John Ferguson-Davie; Richard Bremridge	Member of Parliament for Barnstaple; 1865–1880; With: Sir George Stucley, Bt 1865–1868; Charles Henry Williams 1868–1874; Samuel Danks Waddy 1874–1880	Succeeded by Viscount Lymington; Robert Carden
