= George Strauss =

British politician (1901–1993)

The Right Honourable The Lord Strauss PC

Minister of Supply
- In office 7 October 1947 – 26 October 1951
- Prime Minister: Clement Attlee
- Preceded by: John Wilmot
- Succeeded by: Duncan Sandys

Member of Parliament for Vauxhall
- In office 23 February 1950 – 7 April 1979
- Preceded by: New constituency
- Succeeded by: Stuart Holland

Member of Parliament for Lambeth North
- In office 23 October 1934 – 3 February 1950
- Preceded by: Frank Briant
- Succeeded by: Constituency abolished
- In office 30 May 1929 – 7 October 1931
- Preceded by: Frank Briant
- Succeeded by: Frank Briant

Personal details
- Born: 18 July 1901
- Died: 5 June 1993 (aged 91)
- Party: Labour
- Spouses: Patricia O'Flynn (m. 1932; died 1987) Benita Armstrong (m. 1987)
- Parent(s): Arthur Strauss; Minna Cohen

George Russell Strauss, Baron Strauss PC (18 July 1901 – 5 June 1993) was a long-serving British Labour Party politician, who was a Member of Parliament (MP) for 46 years and was Father of the House of Commons from 1974 to 1979.

== Early life ==
Strauss was the son of the Conservative (and previously a Liberal Unionist) MP Arthur Strauss (1847–1920), who later joined the Labour Party. George Strauss was educated at Rugby School, where the hostile treatment experienced by him and other Jewish boys left him as a vehement supporter of racial equality. He became a metal merchant and a leading member of the London County Council, on which his wife Patricia also served.

== Political career ==
Strauss' first parliamentary contest was in Lambeth North in 1924, when he lost by just 29 votes; however, he gained the seat in 1929. He lost it in Labour's landslide defeat of 1931, but regained it in a 1934 by-election. In 1939 Strauss was expelled from the Labour Party for seven months for supporting the 'Popular Front' movement of Stafford Cripps, whom he had served as Parliamentary private secretary.

Strauss was parliamentary secretary at the Ministry of Transport 1945–47 and was the Minister of Supply from 1947 to 1951. After boundary changes, he became MP for Vauxhall in 1950, which he represented until 1979. On 9 July 1979 he was created a life peer as Baron Strauss, of Vauxhall in the London Borough of Lambeth.

== Bibliography ==
- Times Guide to the House of Commons October 1974
- Leigh Rayment's Historical List of MPs

Parliament of the United Kingdom
Preceded by Frank Briant	Member of Parliament for Lambeth North; 1929–1931	Succeeded by Frank Briant
Preceded by Frank Briant	Member of Parliament for Lambeth North; 1934–1950	Constituency abolished
New constituency	Member of Parliament for Vauxhall; 1950–1979	Succeeded by Stuart Holland
Preceded by Sir Robin Turton	Father of the House; 1974–1979	Succeeded by John Parker
Political offices
Preceded by John Wilmot	Minister of Supply; 1947–1951	Succeeded by Duncan Sandys
