= Sir William Fraser, 4th Baronet =

English politician, author and collector

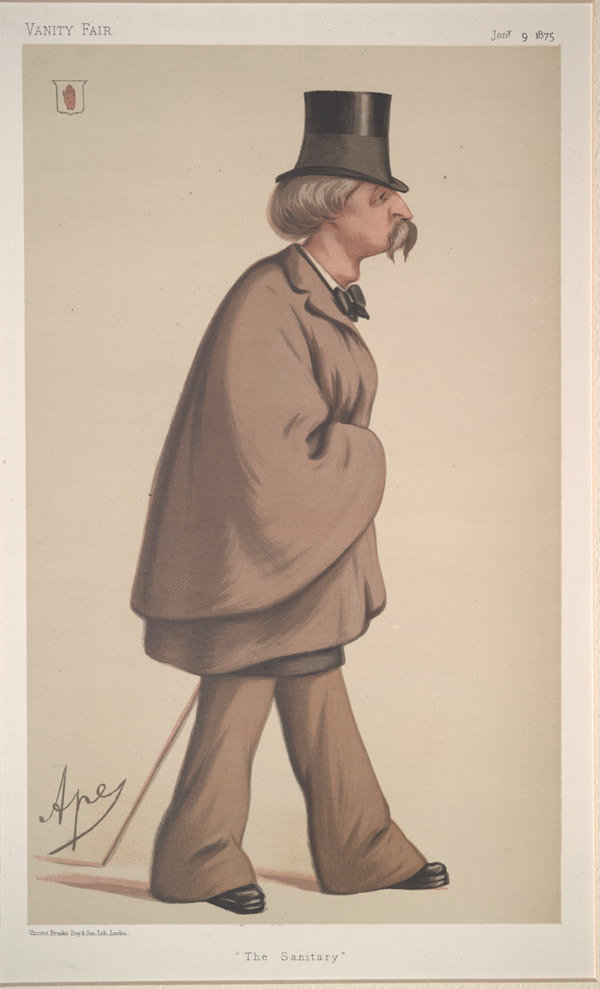
- "The Sanitary". Caricature by "Ape" published in Vanity Fair in 1875.

Member of Parliament for Barnstaple
- In office 1852–1853 Serving with Richard Bremridge
- Preceded by: John Fortescue; Richard Bremridge
- Succeeded by: Richard Samuel Guinness; John Laurie

Member of Parliament for Barnstaple
- In office 1857–1859 Serving with John Laurie
- Preceded by: Richard Samuel Guinness; George Buck
- Succeeded by: George Potts; John Ferguson Davie

Member of Parliament for Ludlow
- In office 1863–1865 Serving with George Windsor-Clive
- Preceded by: Beriah Botfield; George Windsor-Clive
- Succeeded by: John Edmund Severne; George Windsor-Clive

Member of Parliament for Kidderminster
- In office 1874–1880
- Preceded by: Albert Grant
- Succeeded by: John Brinton

Personal details
- Born: 10 February 1826
- Died: 17 August 1898 (aged 72) Westminster, London, England
- Party: Conservative
- Parent: Sir James Fraser, 3rd Baronet (father)

Sir William Augustus Fraser, 4th Baronet (10 February 1826 – 17 August 1898), of Pilton House, near Barnstaple, Devon, was an English politician, author and collector. He was elected member of parliament for Barnstaple (Devon) in 1852, and again in 1857, and for Ludlow (Shropshire) in 1863 and for Kidderminster (Worcestershire) in 1874.

== Origins ==
He was the eldest son and heir of Sir James Fraser, 3rd Baronet, a colonel of the 7th Hussars, who had served on Wellington's staff at the Battle of Waterloo in 1815.

== Biography ==
Fraser was educated at Eton and at Christ Church, Oxford, graduating B.A. and M.A. In 1847 he was appointed an officer in the 1st Life Guards, but retired with a captain's rank in 1852. He then set about entering parliament, and the ups and downs of his political career were rather remarkable. He was returned for Barnstaple in 1852, but the election was declared void on account of bribery, and the constituency was disfranchised for two years.

At the election of 1857 Sir William, who had meantime been defeated at Harwich, was again returned at Barnstaple. He was, however, defeated in 1859, but was elected in 1863 at Ludlow. This seat he held for only two years, when he was again defeated and did not re-enter parliament until 1874, when he was returned for Kidderminster, a constituency he represented for six years, when he retired. He was a familiar figure at the Carlton Club, always ready with a copious collection of anecdotes of Wellington, Benjamin Disraeli and Napoleon III.

William Fraser was a member of the Society of Dilettanti (1857) and the author of the book "Members of the Society of Dilettanti, 1736–1874, edited by Sir William Frazer", Chiswick Press.

== Bibliography ==
Books written by him include:

- Words on Wellington (1889)
- Disraeli and His Day (1891)
- Hic et Ubique (1893)
- Napoleon III. (1896)
- Waterloo Ball (1897). A book on the Duchess of Richmond's ball.

== Death ==
He died in Westminster on 17 August 1898, aged 72.

== Bequests ==
Fraser bequeathed a large fortune to be accumulated in trust during twenty-one years for the benefit of his nephew, Sir Keith Alexander Fraser, eldest son of General James Keith Fraser, formerly colonel of the 1st Life Guards, who succeeded him in the baronetcy. By his will dated 1 December 1886, and proved in October 1898, he further bequeathed a splendid collection of Gillray's caricatures to the House of Lords, a similar collection of H.B.'s caricatures, and a unique set of portraits of former speakers to the House of Commons; the chairs of Thackeray and Dickens respectively to the Travellers' Club and the Athenaeum, Horatio Nelson's sword to the United Service Club, Byron's sofa to the Garrick Club, the manuscript of Gray's 'Elegy' to Eton College library, and the Duke of Marlborough's sword to the Scots Guards at St James's Palace.

The chief portion of Sir William Fraser's library was sold by auction by Messrs. Sotheby, 22 to 30 April 1901, and one thousand eight hundred and fifty-two lots fetched £20,334 18s., or more than twice what Fraser had given for them. The chief items were extra-illustrated books and books with autograph inscriptions by distinguished persons.

== Notes ==
Parliament of the United Kingdom
Preceded by John Fortescue; Richard Bremridge	Member of Parliament for Barnstaple; 1852–1853; With: Richard Bremridge	Succeeded by Richard Samuel Guinness; John Laurie
Preceded by Richard Samuel Guinness; George Buck	Member of Parliament for Barnstaple; 1857–1859; With: John Laurie	Succeeded by George Potts; John Ferguson Davie
Preceded by Beriah Botfield; George Windsor-Clive	Member of Parliament for Ludlow; 1863–1865; With: George Windsor-Clive	Succeeded by John Edmund Severne; George Windsor-Clive
Preceded by Albert Grant	Member of Parliament for Kidderminster; 1874–1880	Succeeded by John Brinton
Baronetage of the United Kingdom
Preceded by James Fraser	Baronet of Ledeclune; 1834–1898	Succeeded by Keith Fraser
