= William Gastrell =

Colonel Sir William Henry Houghton Gastrell CMG TD FRGS (24 September 1852 – 11 April 1935) was Conservative MP for Lambeth North.

He was born in Gloucestershire and educated at Cheltenham College. He moved to London, where he obtained a commission in the Middlesex Yeomanry, rising to the rank of major and second-in-command of the unit in 1901. In 1909, he was awarded the Territorial Decoration. He was subsequently promoted to the rank of colonel in the Army Service Corps, commanding Woolwich District.

He was a member of London County Council for St Pancras South from 1904 to 1907 for the Moderates, forerunners of the Municipal Reform Party. He previously stood unsuccessfully in 1901.

He stood unsuccessfully in Lambeth North in 1906, won the seat from the Liberals in January 1910, held it in December 1910, but lost it to them in 1918.

He was knighted in 1917.
