= Richard Samuel Guinness =

Irish lawyer and Member of Parliament

Richard Samuel Guinness (7 June 1797 – 27 August 1857) was an Irish lawyer and a Member of Parliament.

== Parents ==
Guinness was a son of Richard Guinness (1755–1829), a Dublin barrister and judge, and his wife Mary Darley, descended from a well-known Dublin house-building family. He was a great-nephew of the brewer Arthur Guinness.

His elder brother Robert Rundell Guinness (1789–1857) founded the Guinness Mahon merchant bank in 1836.

== Career ==
Guinness studied at King's Inns, Dublin. He was called to the bar and practised as a barrister. He was also a banker in partnership with his elder brother Robert, but this was dissolved in the 1830s. He then worked as a land agent, trading as "R. Guinness & Co.", but found it difficult in the aftermath of the Irish famine of the 1840s.

At the 1847 general election, Guinness was elected for the Conservative Party as a Member of Parliament in the House of Commons of the United Kingdom for Kinsale, and took his seat at Westminster. However, an election petition was filed by the losing Whig candidate, William Henry Watson, and early in 1848 a select committee of three Whigs and two Conservatives found that Guinness's agents' hospitality in providing free drinks for the electorate of Kinsale in Kiley's public house had amounted to bribery. While Guinness was personally exonerated, his election was declared void. He did not stand at the resulting by-election, and the Whig Benjamin Hawes took the seat by just three votes.

At a double by-election on 25 August 1854, Guinness was again elected to parliament as a Conservative, this time for Barnstaple in Devon, and held the seat for three years. He did not stand for re-election at the 1857 general election.

== Personal life ==
On 25 November 1833, at the residence of the British ambassador to France, in Verdun, Guinness married Katherine Frances Jenkinson, a daughter of Sir Charles Jenkinson, 10th Baronet and his wife Katherine Campbell, a daughter of Walter Campbell of Shawfield. Sir Charles was a cousin of Lord Liverpool, the Prime Minister from 1812 to 1827.

They rebuilt and lived at Deepwell House, Blackrock, Dublin, and also had other houses at 17 Sillwood Place, Brighton, Sussex, and 4 Park Place, St James's, Westminster.

They couple had eight children, including:

- Col. Charles W. N. Guinness CB (1839–1894)
- Arthur C. C. J. Guinness (1841–1897), who emigrated to Melbourne
- Sir Reginald R. B. Guinness (1842–1909) JP, DL for County Dublin
- Adelaide Maria Guinness (1844-1916), known as "Dodo", who married her third cousin Edward Guinness, 1st Earl of Iveagh
- Claude H. C. Guinness (1852–1895), the managing director of Guinness 1886–95

Guinness became known within his family as Old Pelican or Old Pel.

Guinness died in Dublin in 1857, aged 60. His executors were Samuel Nalty and Anna Maria Yelverton. His net estate at death was just £100.

== Notes ==
Parliament of the United Kingdom
Preceded by William Henry Watson	Member of Parliament for Kinsale; 1847 – 1848	Succeeded by Benjamin Hawes
