= Sir Alexander Craufurd, 1st Baronet =

Sir Alexander Craufurd, 1st Baronet (c. 1729 – 15 December 1797), of Kilbirney, was a Scottish baronet.

== Early life ==
Craufurd was born c. 1729 at Kilwinning, Scotland. He was the son of Quintin Craufurd of Newark, Ayrshire and Ann Robinson. His father was Justiciary Baillie for the West Seas of Scotland. His younger brother, also named Quintin Craufurd, was an author who helped Queen Marie Antoinette escape in the Flight to Varennes.

His paternal grandparents were James Craufurd of Newark Castle, Ayrshire and Ann Kennedy (a daughter of Quentin Kennedy of Drummellane).

Drummellan Castle was in the valley of the Water of Girvan, about 3km to the north-east of Dailly. It was demolished in the 19th Century.

His maternal grandfather was merchant James Robinson of Irvine, North Ayrshire, Scotland.

== Career ==
Craufurd had sasine of the merkland of Pennyglen (near Maybole), "on a charter of adjudication by Thomas, Earl of Cassilis, dated 4th March 1762; and another of the threepenny lands of Wester Newark, forty penny land of Easter Newark, twenty penny land of Hillend, the lands of Drummelling, which are part of Hillend, all in Maybole parish, on a charter of adjudication from Chancery, dated 20th February 1762." On the advice of his mother, he sold these lands to the Earl of Cassilis.

He was created 1st Baronet Craufurd, of Kilbirney, Ayrshire on 8 June 1781.

== Personal life ==
On 30 May 1760, Craufurd was married to Jane Crokatt (d. 1794), daughter of James Crokatt of Luxborough House, Essex. Together, they were the parents of:

- Sir James Gregan-Craufurd, 2nd Baronet (1761–1839), who married Maria Theresa Gage, a daughter of Margaret Kemble Gage and Gen. Hon. Thomas Gage (a son of the Thomas Gage, 1st Viscount Gage), in 1792; he served as British Resident at Hamburg and Minister at Copenhagen.
- Sir Charles Gregan Craufurd (1763–1821), a Lieutenant-General and MP for East Retford who married Anna Mary, widow of Thomas Pelham-Clinton, 3rd Duke of Newcastle, in 1800.
- Robert Craufurd (1764–1812), a Major-General and MP for East Retford who married Mary Frances Holland, a daughter of Henry Holland of Hans Place, and granddaughter of the landscape designer Lancelot "Capability" Brown, in 1800.
- Quintin Craufurd (b. 1767)
- Daniel Craufurd (1768–c. 1810), who married Bridget Holland, also a daughter of Henry Holland, in 1798. He was lost at sea in c. 1810.

Lady Craufurd died in 1794. Sir Alexander died on 15 December 1797. He was succeeded in the baronetcy by his eldest son, James.

=== Descendants ===
Through his son Daniel, he was a grandfather of Charlotte Anne Craufurd, who married Lt.-Col. Sir James John Fraser, 3rd Baronet, and after his death, Sir Ralph Howard, 1st Baronet, son of Hon. Hugh Howard (a son of the 1st Viscount Wicklow and 1st Countess of Wicklow).

Baronetage of the United Kingdom
New creation	Baronet (of Kilbirney); 1781–1797	Succeeded by James Gregan-Craufurd
