= Moreton House, Bideford =

Country house in Devon, England

Coordinates: 51°0′53.2″N 4°13′51.2″W

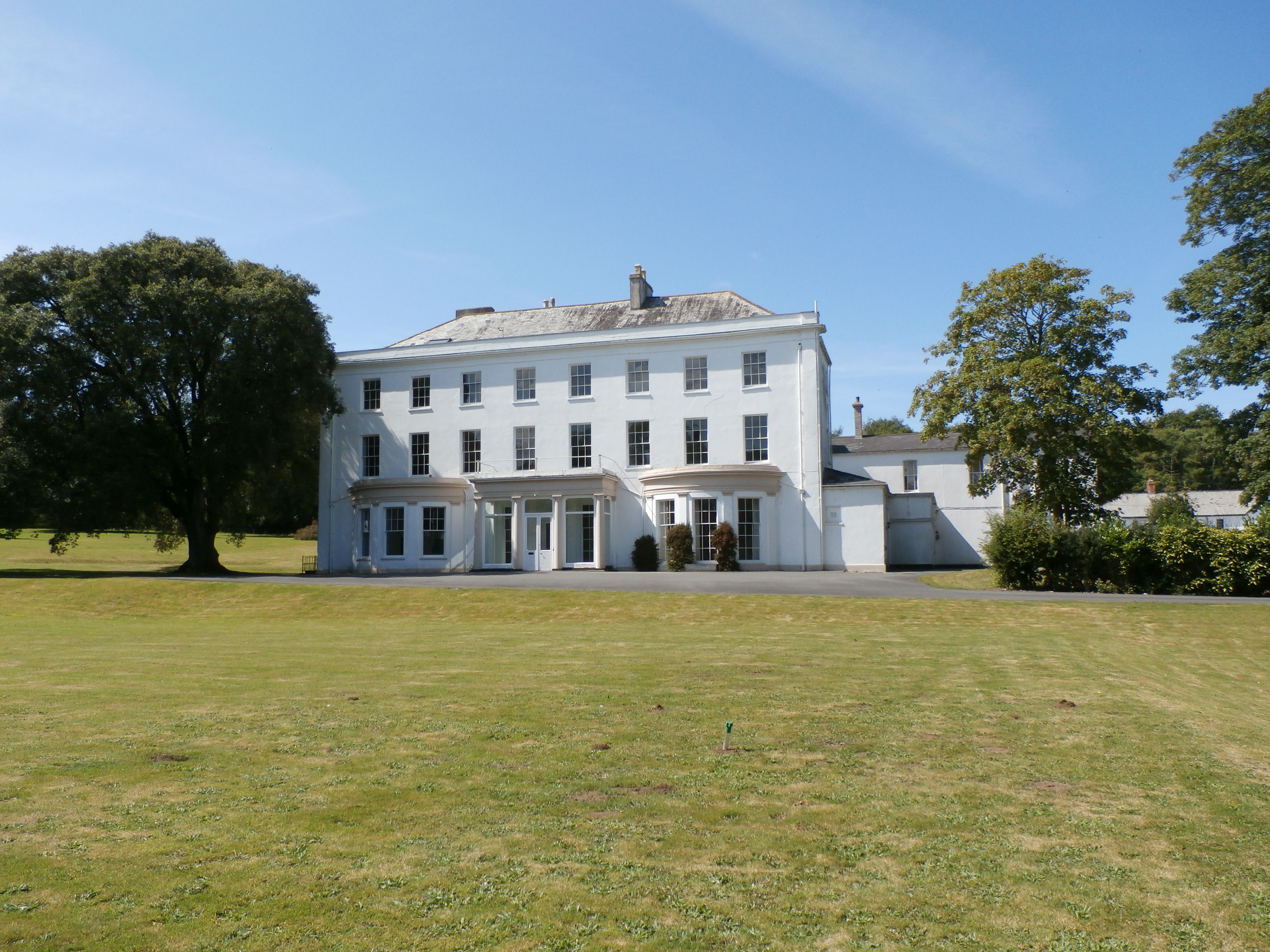
- Moreton House , East front
- Interactive map of the Moreton House, Bideford area

General information
- Completed: 1760 (Daddon House); 1821 (current building)

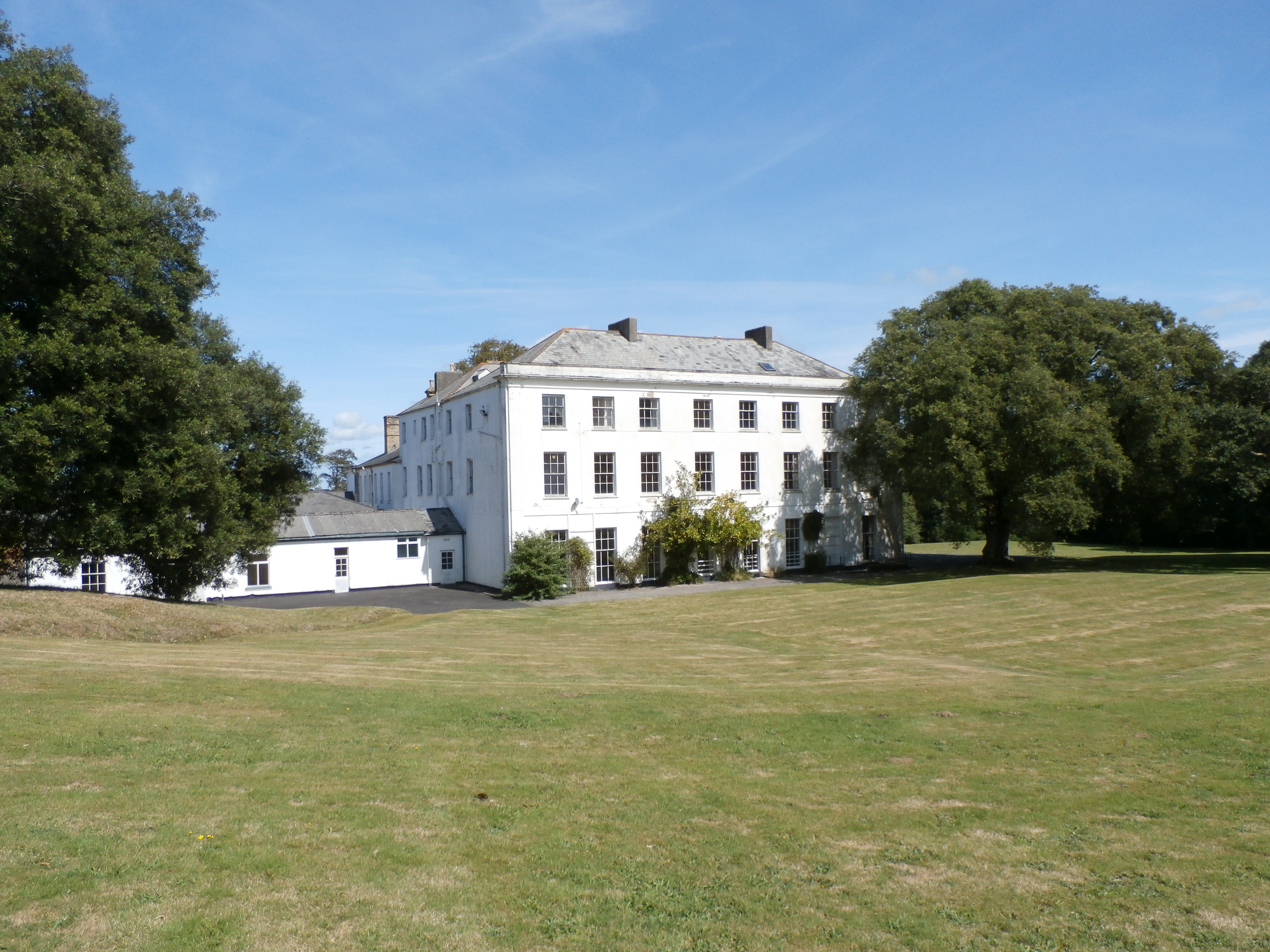
Moreton House, south front

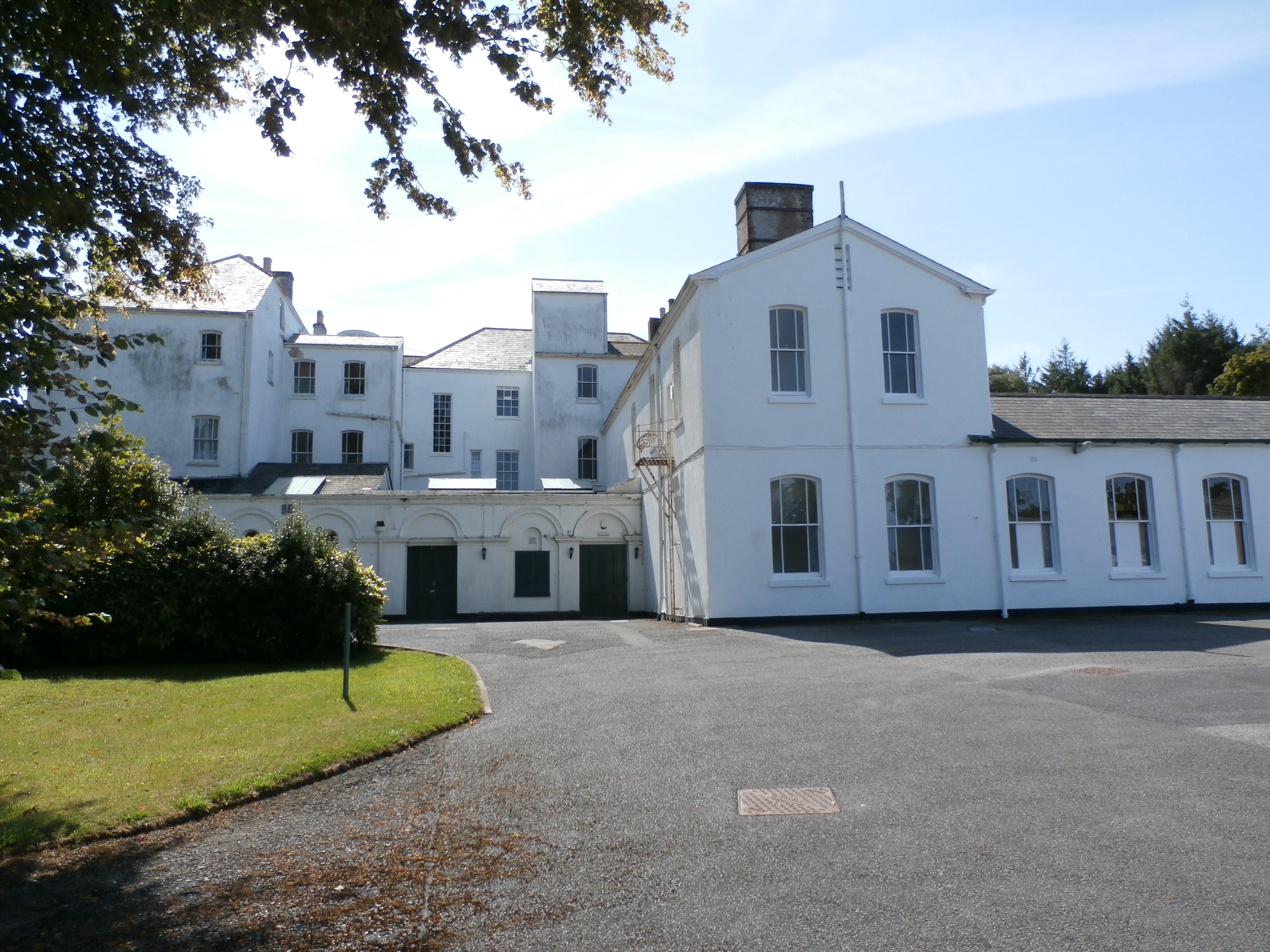
Moreton House, north front

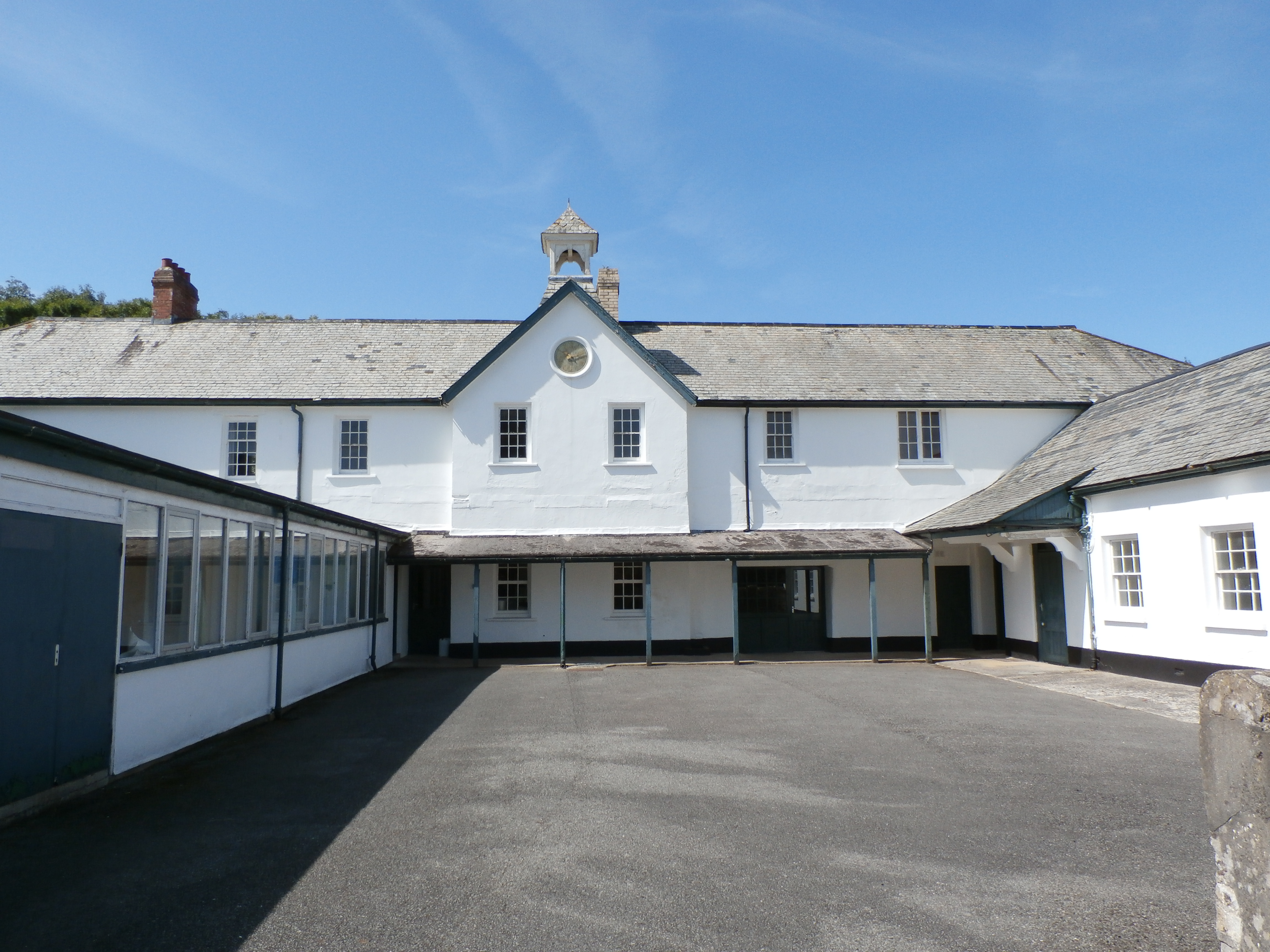
Moreton House, stable block

Moreton House (formerly until 1821 Daddon House) is a grade II listed country house and former large estate near Bideford, North Devon, England. The house is about one mile west of the old centre of Bideford town, (Note: measured from the parish church at the western end of Bideford Long Bridge) its entrance drive leading off the south side of the road between Bideford and the village of Abbotsham. It has in recent years become increasingly surrounded by the suburbs of Bideford, and in 2014 only 5 acres of the former parkland remain attached to the house. The estate is said anciently to have been the property of the famous Grenville family, lords of the Manor of Bideford, and of Stowe, Kilkhampton in Cornwall. It was later acquired by the Buck merchant family of Bideford, which rebuilt the house in 1760 and again in 1821.

In 1858 the Buck family changed its name to Stucley, in reference to a recent female ancestress and heiress. The now "Stucley" family, which had inherited other substantial residences at Hartland Abbey, Affeton and North Molton, sold Moreton House in 1956, after which it was occupied by Grenville College, a private school, which vacated the site in 2009. The house is a fine example of Georgian architecture and had at one time ornate gardens with two lakes, fountains, waterfalls and formal herbaceous borders. The house with five acres of land was offered for sale in 2014 for the surprisingly low price of £500,000. The house's former name is memorialised by an industrial estate called "Daddon Court" a short distance to the south of the house.

== History ==
=== Buck ===
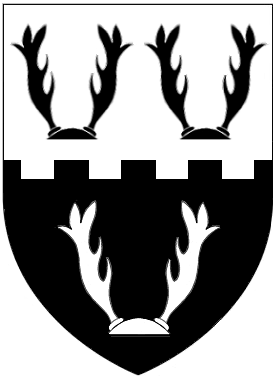
Canting arms of Buck of Daddon (Moreton), Bideford: Per fess embattled argent and sable, three buck's attires each fixed to the scalp counterchanged

The family of Buck were Bideford ship owners and merchants who from the 17th century traded with the American Colonies and owned tobacco plantations in Virginia and a saw-mill in Bideford, Maine. Bideford was the leading tobacco trading port in England. From their profits they acquired much land near Bideford and eventually by the end of the 18th century their estates almost surrounded the north side of the town from Westleigh to Northam. Their arms are: Per fess embattled argent and sable three buck's attires each fixed to the scalp counterchanged. These arms are quartered with the ancient arms of Stucley by the present Stucley Baronets, with the Stucley arms in the 1st and 4th quarters of greatest honour. The descent of the Buck family is as follows:

- John Buck, whose wife's family name was Hartwell.
- Hartwell Buck (died 1691), son, who was buried at Bideford. He married Sibella Ford (died 1706), daughter of John Ford.
- George Buck (1674–1743), 3rd son and eventual heir. He was seven times mayor of Bideford. In 1697 he married Sara Stucley (died 1742), daughter and in her issue heiress of Dennis Stucley (1673/4-1741/2) of Affeton in the parish of West Worlington, Devon, a very ancient and prominent Devonshire gentry family, which had however almost been ruined during the Civil War for its adherence to the Royalist cause.
- John Buck (died 1745), 3rd son and heir, who in 1729 married Judith Pawley (died 1739), sole heiress of William Pawley of Bideford
- George Buck (1731–1794), eldest son and heir, JP for Devon. In 1755 he inherited the estate of Affeton and other lands from his great-uncle Dennis Stucley (died 1755), Sheriff of Devon in 1748, who died unmarried. In 1754 he married Anne Orchard (1730–1820), daughter of Paul Orchard (died 1740), MP, of Hartland Abbey, near Bideford, and sister of Paul Orchard (1739–1812) of Hartland Abbey, who died childless and bequeathed it to his other sister Charlotte Hooper Morrison of Yeo Vale House. (Note: Vivian, p.723; Lauder, p.146: Paul Orchard left Hartland Abbey not to his sister Anne Buck, as was widely believed by modern historians, but to his other sister Charlotte Hooper Morrison, as discovered by "Sir Hugh Stucley" who found a copy of her will in the family archives at Hartland Abbey.) The Orchards had made their wealth through their involvement with the Customs and Excise in Exeter, Barnstaple and Bideford. George Buck rebuilt Daddon House in about 1760, which he made his residence. The irregular plan indicates that some of the fabric of the older structure was retained. The Bucks visited Affeton from time to time, and stayed with the tenant of the barton farm as the former grand fortified manor house of the Stucleys had been destroyed in the Civil War with only the ruinous gate house surviving. He acquired the advowson of Bideford from the heirs of William Henry Granville, 3rd Earl of Bath (1692–1711), the last Grenville lord of the Manor of Bideford. (Note: He made a presentation to the rectory in 1783, as stated on the framed list of rectors in Bideford Church. In 1810 the patron was Lewis William Buck (Risdon, 1810 additions, p.423))

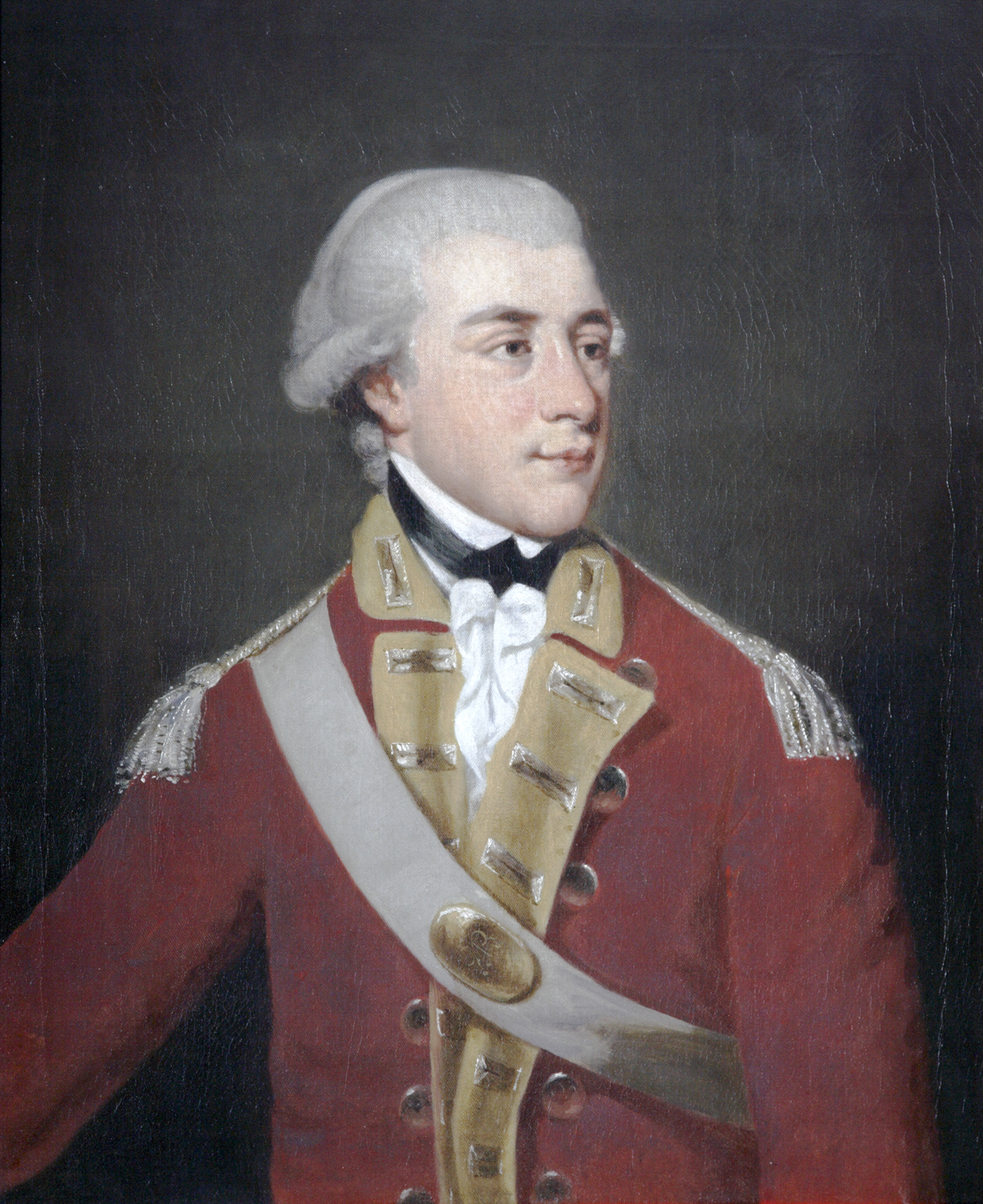
George Stucley Buck (1755–1791), of Daddon House (later called Morton House) and Affeton, Devon, dressed in military uniform. Portrait by a follower of George Romney (1734–1802), collection of Bideford Town Council, displayed at Bideford Town Hall

- George Stucley Buck (1755–1791), only son and heir. In 1780 he married Martha Keats (1753–1833), eldest daughter of Richard Keats, Master of Tiverton school, rector of Bideford and King's Nympton. He died aged 36, thus having predeceased both his parents. His portrait painted by a follower of George Romney (1734–1802) hangs in Bideford Town Hall.
- George Pawley Buck (1782–1805), second son and heir, died aged 23 without children. (Note: "Buck, George Pawley (a minor), seated at Daddon, Bideford", as recorded by Swete, John, Names of the Noblemen and Principal Gentlemen in the County of Devon, their Seats and Parishes at the Commencement of the Nineteenth Century, 1810, published in 1811 edition of Risdon, Tristram (died 1640), Survey of Devon, London, 1811, with 1810 Additions) As patron he made a presentation to the rectory of Bideford in 1804.
- Lewis William Buck (1784–1858), younger brother. MP for Exeter 1826-32 and for North Devon 1839-57. He was educated at Blundells School in Tiverton and at Emmanuel College, Cambridge. He inherited Hartland Abbey under the will of his great-aunt Charlotte Hooper Morrison. He thus possessed the paternal Buck estate of Daddon and other lands, the Stucley inheritance of Affeton and other lands and also Hartland Abbey and other lands. In 1808 he married Ann Robbins daughter of Thomas Robbins of Roundhams, Berkshire. Lewis is believed in 1821 to have undertaken further building work at Daddon House and to have changed the name to Moreton House. He entertained Benjamin Disraeli at Moreton House, but before he became Prime Minister in 1868, thus after Lewis's death. He had a distinguished political career and it is believed that had he lived long enough to serve under Disraeli's premiership he would have been made a minister and peer, and thus the honour of a baronetcy awarded to his son was in some way a recompense. As patron he made two presentations to the rectory of Bideford, in 1844 and 1853.

=== Buck (Stucley) ===
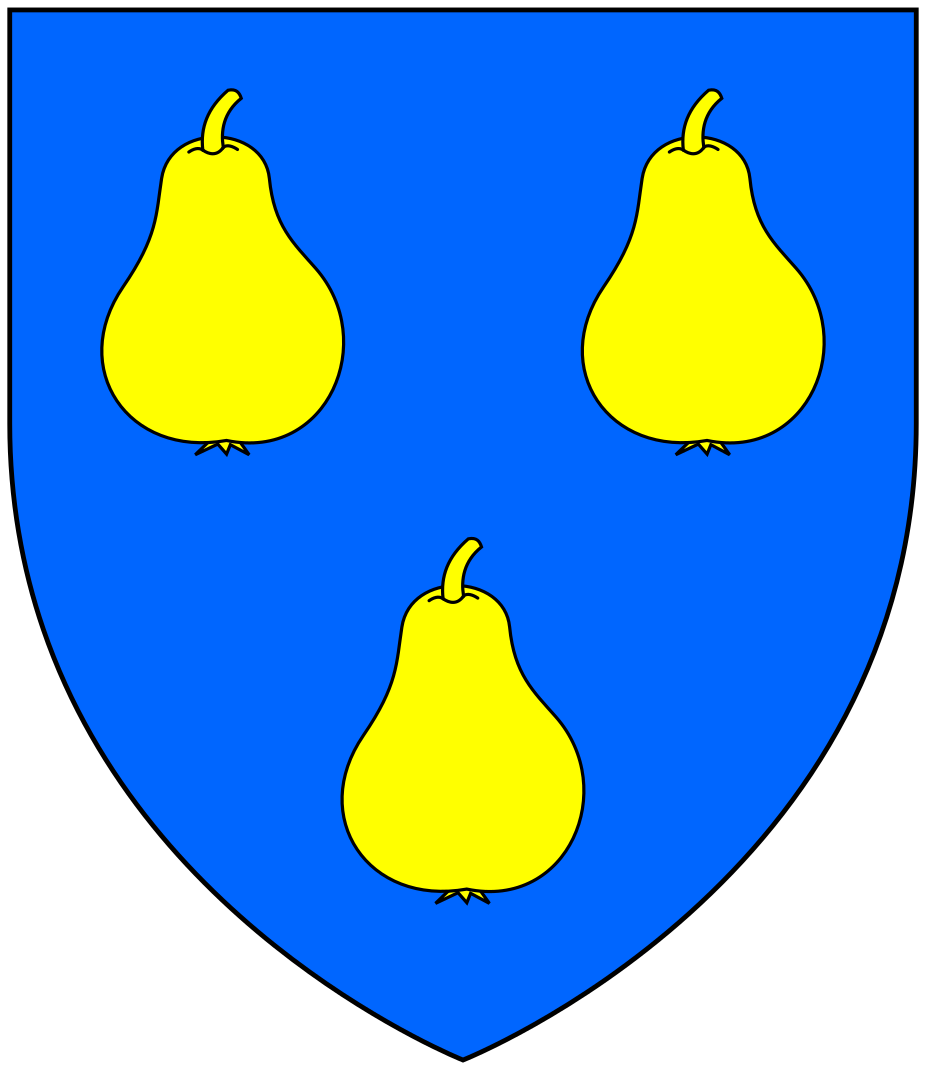
Arms of Stucley: Azure, three pears pendant or Motto: Bellement et Hardiment ("beautifully and bravely")

- Sir George Stucley Buck Stucley, 1st Baronet (1812–1900), son and heir, who in 1858 assumed by royal licence the name and arms of Stucley and was created a baronet in 1859. He served as MP for Barnstaple twice, but retired from politics in 1868 and later served as Sheriff of Devon. He married firstly Lady Elizabeth O'Bryan, 4th daughter and co-heiress of William O'Brien, 2nd Marquess of Thomond (1765–1846), by whom he had children. He had a keen interest in family history, heraldry and his ancestors. He redecorated Hartland Abbey and in 1868-9 reconstructed the ruinous Gatehouse at Affeton, the only part of the fortified manor house of the Stucleys which had been left standing since the destruction of the house during the Civil War, which he renamed "Affeton Castle" and used as a shooting lodge for the grouse shooting season on Affeton Moor. He lived at Hartland Abbey from 1840 to 1870, when following the death of his first wife he handed ownership of Hartland Abbey to his son Lewis. He married secondly in 1872 to Louisa Granville, daughter of Sir Beville Granville of Wellesbourne, Warwickshire. He moved to Exbury House on the Solent, which he rented to pursue his pastime of yacht-sailing. As patron he made two presentations to the rectory of Bideford, in 1878 (Rev. Roger Granville (died 1896), author of History of the Granville Family (lords of the manor of Bideford for many centuries)) and in 1896. He died in 1900 aged 88 at Moreton House.
- Lt.-Col. Sir William Lewis Stucley, 2nd Baronet (1836–1911), eldest son by his father's first wife, died without children. He was survived by his 2nd wife Marion, who lived on at Hartland Abbey until 1932.
- Sir Edward Arthur George Stucley, 3rd Baronet (1852–1927), younger brother, died without children. In 1913 he combined three of the first floor rooms of Moreton House overlooking the gardens to create a ballroom.
- Sir Hugh Nicholas Granville Stucley, 4th Baronet (1873–1956), eldest half-brother, son of Louisa Granville. He had moved to Moreton House in 1913 and made substantial alterations. Sir Hugh served as a Lieutenant Commander in the Royal Navy. He was elected to the Bideford Town Council and served as Mayor of the Borough. It was the thirty-seventh time that a member of his family had served the Borough as Mayor. He was also elected to Devon County Council in 1906 and was a county alderman in 1908. His main interests were County Finance and Education. His personal interests were fishing, shooting and landscape gardening. It was he who designed the beautiful gardens which Moreton House was formerly well known for. From 1939 to 1945 during World War II Moreton House became the temporary home of King's Mead Preparatory School, which moved from its premises in Seaford in Sussex. Sir Hugh moved to the lodge house and looked after those boys who were too young to be boarders at the school.
- Sir Dennis Frederic Bankes Stucley, 5th Baronet (1907–1983). He spent his early childhood at Pillhead, East-the-Water, Bideford, and his adolescence at Moreton House. Like his father he served as mayor of Bideford. In 1947 he was given by his father the estate of Affeton, with the manor of West Worlington and other nearby land. In 1932 he married Hon. Sheila Bampfylde, daughter and (following the death of her brother in 1936) eventual sole heiress of George Wentworth Warwick Bampfylde, 4th Baron Poltimore (1882–1965) of Poltimore and North Molton and other estates in Devon and elsewhere. The 4th Baron sold off most of his English estates and moved to Rhodesia where he died in 1965. Sheila however inherited the manor of North Molton, with Court Hall (the manor house) and Court House, another large house in the village. The 5th Baronet and his wife lived partly at Court Hall, North Molton, where he followed his enthusiasm for pheasant shooting, and at Hartland Abbey, where his wife created a new garden. In 1956 he sold Moreton House.
- Sir Hugh George Copplestone Bampfylde Stucley, 6th Baronet (born 1945). In 1976 he was resident with his wife and young family in the ancient gatehouse of Affeton, which he had extended to form a nursery wing and additional bedrooms, and personally managed the farm enterprise there of 1,000 acres. He regards Affeton as the family's main seat, which unlike Hartland Abbey is a private house, not open to the paying public.

== Grenville College ==
Moreton House was sold by the Stucley family and became part of Grenville College, a private school. The gardens used to be maintained and were open to visitors at certain times. At about this time various other houses were built in the grounds of the house, such as Scott House and Crabbe House. The school playing fields were situated on the surrounding estate, but since the school's closure this land has been built over as a housing development.

== Sources ==
- Lauder, Rosemary, Devon Families, Tiverton, 2002, Stucley family, pp. 142–150
- Vivian, Lt.Col. J.L., (Ed.) The Visitations of the County of Devon: Comprising the Heralds' Visitations of 1531, 1564 & 1620, Exeter, 1895, Stucley & Buck pedigree, pp. 721–3
