= Lewis William Buck =

British politician

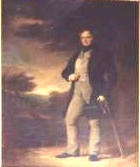
Lewis William Buck (1784–1858), portrait by Francis Grant (1803–1878), collection of Stucley family of Hartland Abbey, Devon. Displayed in Billiards Room, Hartland Abbey

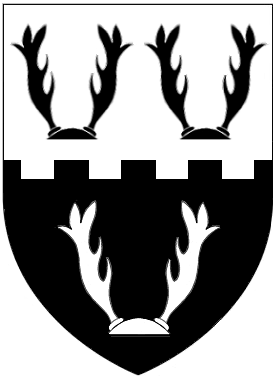
Canting arms of Buck of Daddon (alias Moreton), Bideford: Per fess embattled argent and sable, three buck's attires each fixed to the scalp counterchanged

Lewis William Buck (1784–1858) of Moreton House, Bideford, and Hartland Abbey, Devon, was Member of Parliament for Exeter 1826–32 and for North Devon 1839–57, and was Sheriff of Devon in 1825/6. A full-length portrait of Lewis William Buck by Francis Grant (1803–1878) was presented to him by the people of North Devon after he had served eighteen years as their MP, now displayed in the billiards room of Hartland Abbey, with his electioneering posters on each side.

== Origins ==
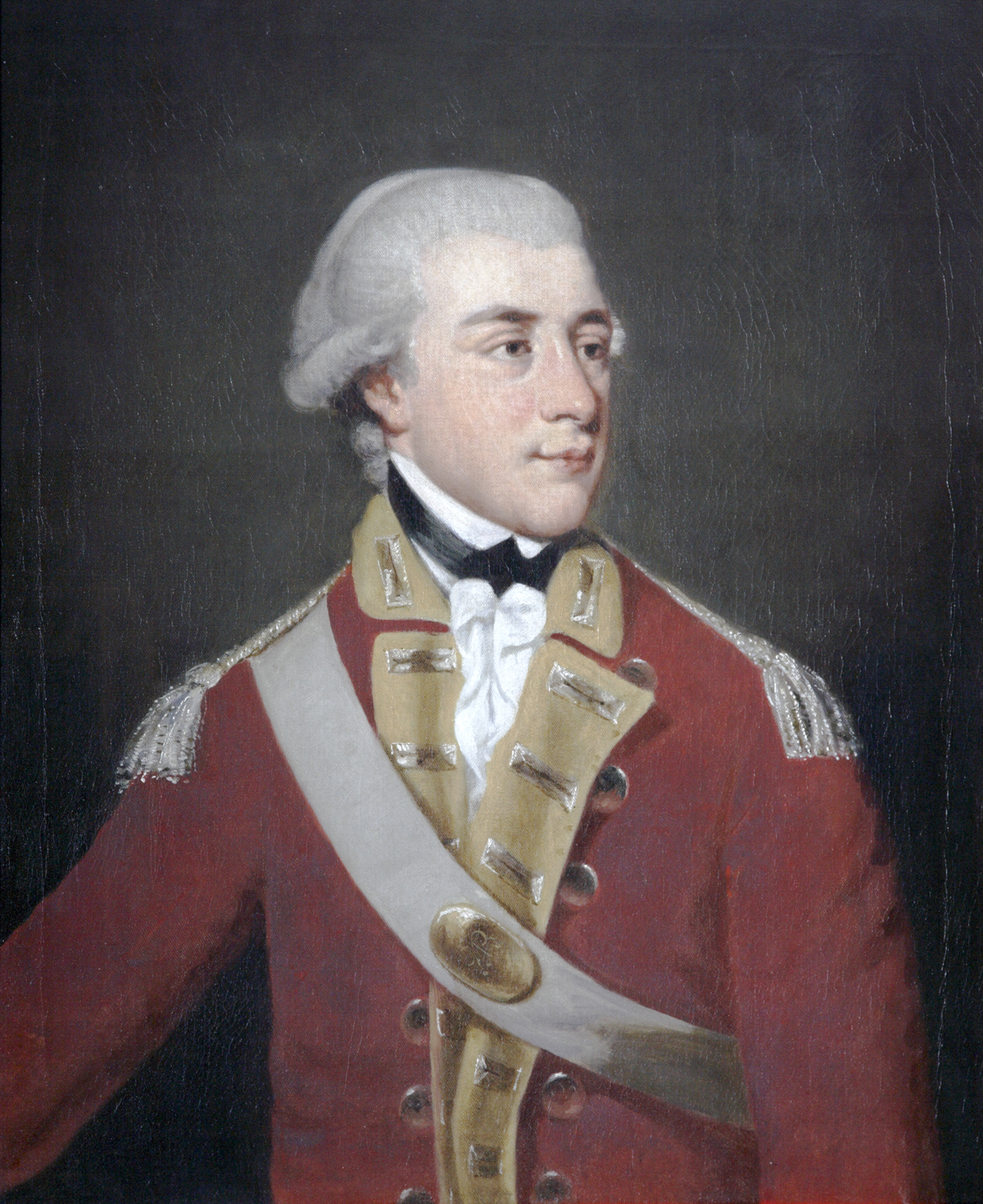
George Stucley Buck (1755–1791), of Daddon House (later called Morton House) and Affeton, Devon, dressed in military uniform. He was the father of Lewis Stucley Buck. Portrait by a follower of George Romney (1734–1802), collection of Bideford Town Council, displayed at Bideford Town Hall

He was a younger son of George Stucley Buck (1755–1791) by his wife Martha Keats (1753–1833), eldest daughter of Rev. Richard Keats, rector of Bideford and King's Nympton and Master of Blundells School, Tiverton (1775–1797), and sister of Admiral Sir Richard Goodwin Keats (1757–1834). A portrait of George Stucley Buck painted by a follower of George Romney (1734–1802) hangs in Bideford Town Hall. The family of Buck were Bideford ship owners and merchants who from the 17th century traded with the American Colonies and owned tobacco plantations in Virginia and a saw-mill in Bideford, Maine. Bideford was the leading tobacco trading port in England. The family originated in Ireland, having settled in Devon in the late seventeenth century. From their profits they acquired much land near Bideford and eventually by the end of the 18th century their estates almost surrounded the north side of the town from Westleigh to Northam. Their arms are: Per fess embattled argent and sable three buck's attires each fixed to the scalp counterchanged. These arms are quartered with the ancient arms of Stucley by the present Stucley Baronets, his direct descendants in the male line, but with the Stucley arms in the 1st and 4th quarters of greatest honour.

== Inheritance ==
Lewis was his father's 3rd son, and thus under the primogeniture custom was not expected to receive any inheritance. He was only 7 years old on the death of his father, who had predeceased his own father George II Buck (d.1794), and the latter intended his grandson Lewis for the priesthood and intended to bestow on him the advowsons of West Worlington (in which parish was situated his estate of Affeton) and Bideford. Events however moved him into a different situation and career.

=== Daddon/Moreton and Affeton ===
In 1805 aged 21 he became the heir of his elder brother George Pawley Buck (1782–1805) of Daddon, who had died aged 23 without progeny, having inherited the paternal estates of Daddon House (the name of which he later changed in 1821 to Moreton House) near Bideford, and Affeton, which latter estate with ruinous fortified manor house, had been inherited in 1755 by his grandfather George II Buck (1731–1794), JP for Devon, and grandson of Sara Stucley (d.1742), following the death without progeny of Sarah's nephew Dennis II Stucley (d.1755), Sheriff of Devon in 1748.

=== Hartland Abbey ===
In 1824, at the age of 40, Lewis inherited Hartland Abbey, about 14 miles west of Bideford, from his father's first cousin Rev. Thomas Hooper Morrison (1767–1824). It was not however with vacant possession as still occupied until her death by Thomas Morrison's aunt Bettina Lawley (d.1833), widow of Col. Paul II Orchard (1739–1812), MP, of Hartland Abbey. Thomas Morrison was the son of Rev. Hooper Morrison of Yeo Vale, Alwington, Devon, by his wife Charlotte Orchard (d.1791) (whose monument survives in the Yeo Vale Chapel (north aisle) of Alwington Church), a sister and in her issue heiress of Paul II Orchard (1739–1812) of Hartland Abbey and sister-in-law of George II Buck (1731–1794), thus great-aunt of Lewis Buck.

== Career ==
He was educated at Blundells School in Tiverton, Devon (of which his maternal grandfather Rev. Richard Keats was headmaster (1775–1797)), and at Emmanuel College, Cambridge. Lewis is believed in 1821 to have undertaken further building work at Daddon House and to have changed its name to Moreton House. He entertained Benjamin Disraeli at Moreton House, but before he became Prime Minister in 1868, thus after Lewis's death. He had a distinguished political career and it is believed that had he lived long enough to serve under Disraeli's premiership he would have been made a minister and peer, and thus the honour of a baronetcy awarded to his son was in some way a recompense.

== Marriage and progeny ==
In 1808 he married Ann Robbins (1791–1879), daughter of Thomas Robbins (d.1806) of Roundham, Hampshire, by whom he had the following progeny:

- Sir George Stucley Buck Stucley, 1st Baronet (1812–1900), eldest son and heir, who in July 1858 assumed by royal licence the surname of Stucley and in April 1859 was created a baronet. His great-great-great grandfather George I Buck (1674–1743), seven times mayor of Bideford, had married Sara Stucley (d.1742), daughter and in her issue heiress of Dennis Stucley (1673–1674 - 1741–1742) of Affeton in the parish of West Worlington, Devon, a very ancient and prominent Devonshire gentry family, which had however almost been ruined during the Civil War for its adherence to the Royalist cause. He is the ancestor of the present Stucley Baronets of Affeton and Hartland Abbey in Devon.
- Louisa Buck, who in 1840 married (as his 2nd wife) Samuel Trehawke Kekewich (1796–1873), of Peamore House near Exeter, who had been co-MP (Tory) for Exeter in 1826 with her father.
- Emma Helena Buck (d.1840)

== Death and burial ==
He died on his birthday, 25 April 1858, aged 74 and was buried at St Helen's Church, Abbotsham, Devon.

== Mural monument, Abbotsham ==
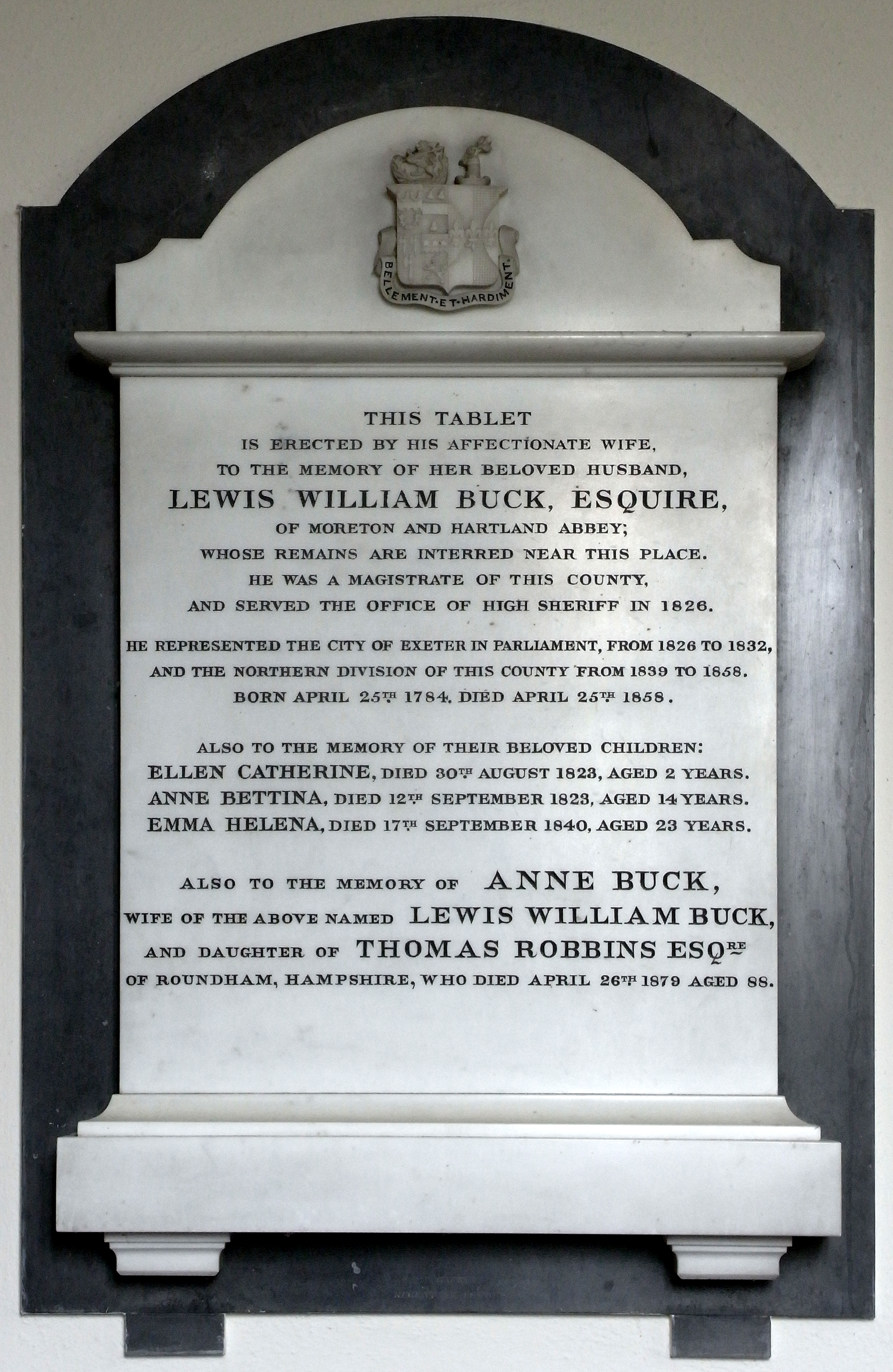
Mural monument to Lewis William Buck (1784–1858), St Helen's Church, Abbotsham

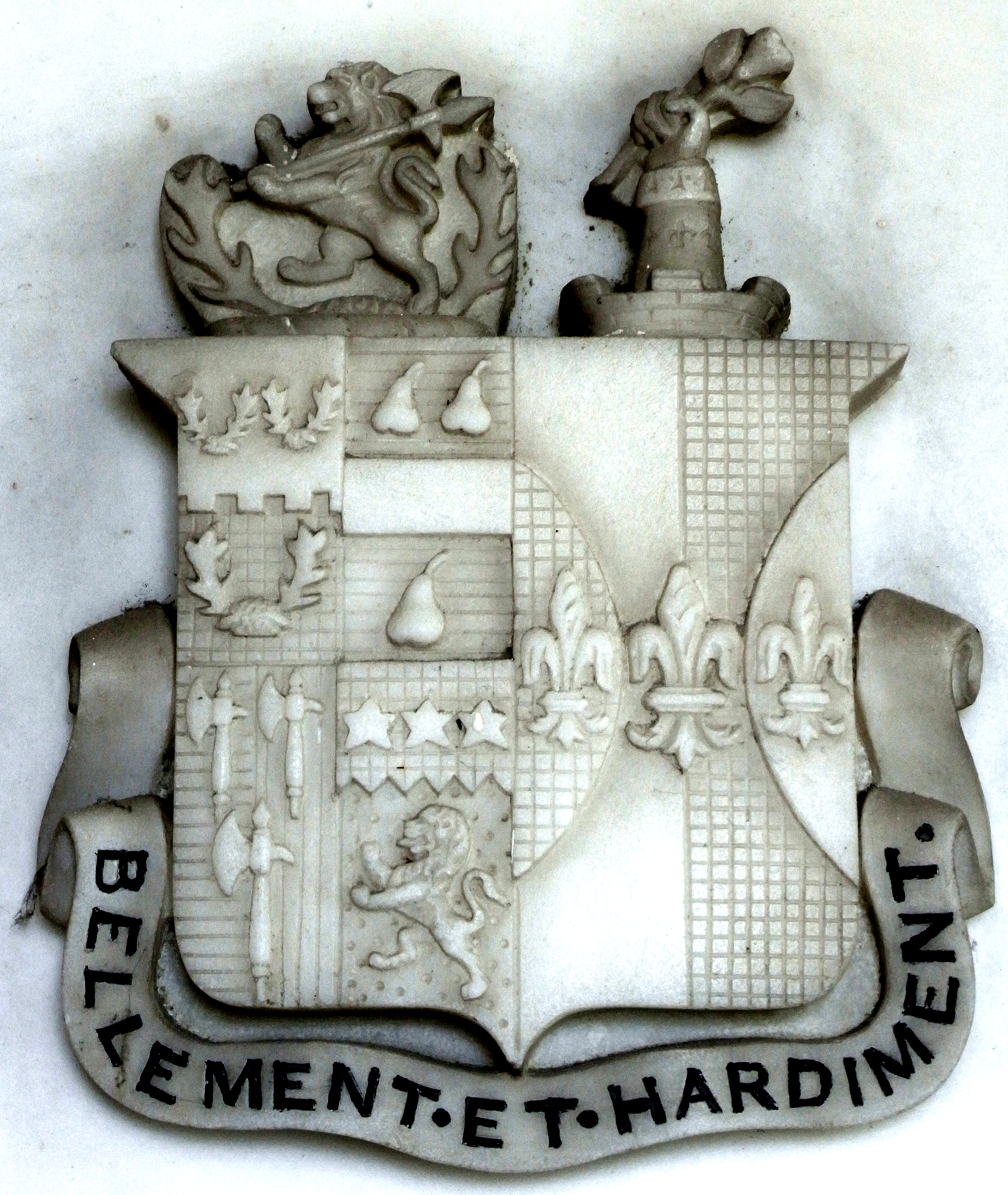
Heraldic escutcheon, detail from mural monument to Lewis William Buck (1784–1858), St Helen's Church, Abbotsham

His mural monument survives on the east wall of the south transept of St Helen's Church, Abbotsham, Devon, inscribed as follows:

"This tablet is erected by his affectionate wife to the memory of her beloved husband lewis William Buck Esquire of Moreton and Hartland Abbey whose remains are interred near this place. He was a magistrate of this county and served the office of High Sheriff in 1826. He represented the City of Exeter in Parliament from 1826 to 1832 and the Northern Division of this county from 1839 to 1858. Born April 25th 1784, died April 25th 1858. Also to the memory of their beloved children: Ellen Catherine, died 30th August 1828 aged 2 years; Anne Bettina, died 12th September 1823 aged 14 years; Emma Helena, died 17th September 1849 aged 23 years. Also to the memory of Anne Buck wife of the above named Lewis William Buck, and daughter of Thomas Robbins Esq.re of Roundham, Hampshire, who died April 26th 1879 aged 88".

The heraldic escutcheon above displays the following arms with hatching: Baron: Quarterly of four:

- 1st: Per fess embattled argent and sable, three buck's attires each fixed to the scalp counterchanged (Buck);
- 2nd: Azure, a fess argent between three pears pendant or (Orchard of Hartland Abbey);
- 3rd: Per pale azure and (gules?) three battle axes (similar to Dennis of Orleigh);
- 4th: Or, a lion rampant sable on a chief indented of the second three mullets argent (Pawley of Gunwin in Lelant; his great-grandfather John Buck (d.1745) married Judith Pawley (d.1739), only child and heiress of William Pawley of Bideford)

impaling Femme: per pale argent and sable, a fleur-de-lys between two flaunches each charged with a fleur-de-lys all counterchanged (Robbins)

Crests: 1st: Between a buck's attires as in the arms sable a lion rampant or the sinister paw holding a battle-axe resting on the shoulder proper (Buck); 2nd: A dexter cubit arm issuing from a mural crown habited azure adorned with three fleur-de-lis or, 1 and 2, the cuff turned up ermine holding in the hand proper a branch of a pear tree with pear attached thereto as in the field (Orchard).

Motto: Bellement et Hardiment ("Beautifully and Bravely")

== Sources ==
- Jenkins, Terry, Biography of "Buck, Lewis William (1784–1858), of Daddon House, Moreton and Hartland Abbey, nr. Bideford, Devon", published in The History of Parliament: House of Commons 1820–1832, ed. D.R. Fisher, 2009
- Lauder, Rosemary, Devon Families, Tiverton, 2002, Stucley family, pp. 142–150
- Vivian, Lt.Col. J.L., (Ed.) The Visitations of the County of Devon: Comprising the Heralds' Visitations of 1531, 1564 & 1620, Exeter, 1895, Stucley & Buck pedigree, pp. 721–3
- Stucley, Sir Dennis, 5th Baronet, "A Devon Parish Lost, A new Home Discovered", Presidential Address published in Transactions of the Devonshire Association, no. 108, 1976, pp. 1–11
- Stucley, Lt.Commander J.H., DSC, RN, (uncle of 6th Baronet) "A Brief Note on Affeton", date unknown
