= Thomas Stukley =

English mercenary (c. 1525–1578)

Captain Thomas Stukley
- Born: 1525
- Died: August 4, 1578 (aged 52–53); Ksar el-Kebir, Morocco
- Other name: "Lusty" Stucley
- Occupation: Mercenary
- Known for: The Life and Death of the Famous Thomas Stukely
- Spouse: Anne Curtis (m. 1554)

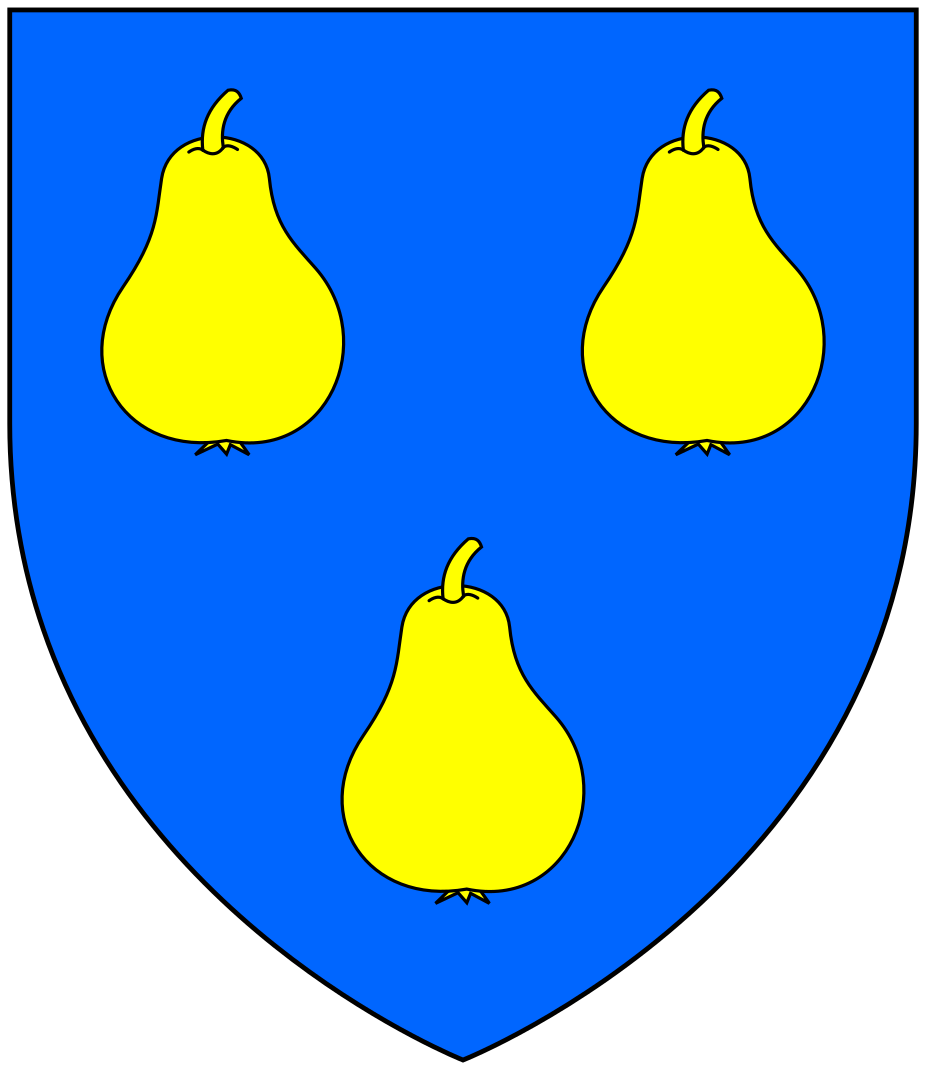
Arms of Stucley of Affeton: Azure, three pears or. Motto: Bellement et Hardiment ("beautifully and bravely")

Thomas Stucley (c. 1525 – 4 August 1578) was an English mercenary who fought in France, Ireland and at the Battle of Lepanto before being killed at the Battle of Alcácer Quibir in 1578. He was a Catholic recusant and a rebel against the Protestant Elizabeth I. He was also rumoured to be an illegitimate son of Elizabeth's father, Henry VIII.

== Family ==
He was a younger son of Sir Hugh Stucley (1496–1559) lord of the manor of Affeton, in the parish of West Worlington in Devon, head of an ancient gentry family, a Knight of the Body to King Henry VIII and Sheriff of Devon in 1545. His mother was Jane Pollard, daughter of Sir Lewis Pollard (c.1465–1526), lord of the manor of King's Nympton, Devon, Justice of the Common Pleas, and his wife Anne Hext.

It has been alleged that he was instead an illegitimate son of King Henry VIII. Details of any wives or children he may have had are imprecise.

== Career ==
Stucley's early mentors were Charles Brandon, 1st Duke of Suffolk, and then the Bishop of Exeter, in whose household he held a post. He was present at Boulogne during the siege of 1544–45, and again in 1550 on the surrender of the city to the English. From 1547 to 1550, he was a standard-bearer at Boulogne, and then entered the service of Edward Seymour, 1st Duke of Somerset. After his master's arrest in 1551 a warrant was issued against him, but he succeeded in escaping to France, where he served in the French army.

His military talents brought him to the attention of Henri III de Montmorency, and he was sent to England with a letter of recommendation from Henry II of France to his supposed half-brother King Edward VI. On his arrival he proceeded on 16 September 1552 to reveal the French plans for the capture of Calais and for a descent upon England, the furtherance of which had, according to his account, been the object of his mission to England. John Dudley, 1st Duke of Northumberland evaded the payment of any reward to Stucley, and sought to gain the friendship of the French king by pretending to disbelieve Stucley's statements.

Stucley, who may well have been the originator of the plans adopted by the French, was imprisoned in the Tower of London for some months. Having run through his brother's inheritance, he was prosecuted for debt on his release in August 1553 and was compelled to become a soldier of fortune once more. This was not his only financial difficulty: once, claiming a legacy, he broke into the late testator's house and searched the coffers, in defiance of a court injunction. In another episode, he was imprisoned in the Tower at the suit of an Irishman he had robbed.

He returned to England in December 1554 in the train of Emmanuel Philibert, Duke of Savoy, after obtaining an amnesty against his creditors' suits, possibly thanks to the Duke of Suffolk. His credit temporarily improved upon his marriage to Anne Curtis, granddaughter and heir of Sir Thomas Curtis, but he was reputed to squander £100 a day and to have sold the blocks of tin with which his father-in-law had paved the yard of his London house. Within a few months, a warrant for his arrest was issued on a charge of uttering false money and he fled abroad again, deserting his wife, to enter the service of the duke of Savoy. He then fought on the victorious side at the Battle of St. Quentin in 1557.

In 1558, Stucley was summoned before the council on a charge of piracy, although he was again acquitted owing to insufficient evidence, and managed to retain the favour of Queen Mary I. On the death of his wife's grandfather at the beginning of Elizabeth's reign he came into money, and he accommodated himself to the Protestant succession and became a supporter of Sir Robert Dudley, Earl of Leicester. In 1561, he was given a captaincy at Berwick, where he lived sumptuously; during the winter, he made firm friends with the Gaelic nobleman Shane O'Neill of Ulster, upon the latter's visit to court at London. In 1562, he obtained a warrant permitting him to bring French ships into English ports although England and France were only nominally at peace.

At about this time, on being presented to the queen he said he would prefer to be sovereign of a molehill than the subject of the greatest king in Christendom and that he had a presentiment he would be a prince before he died. She is said to have remarked, "I hope I shall hear from you when you are installed in your principality". He responded that she surely would, and she demanded, "In what language?" He answered: "In the style of princes, to our dearest sister."

Stucley then devised a plan for a colony in Florida, at the time hotly contested by rival Spanish and French settlers (see Spanish Florida). To this end, he persuaded the queen to supply a ship of 100 tons (including 100 men, plus sailors), to supplement his fleet of five vessels. Having staged a naval pageant for the queen on the Thames, he promptly sailed his fleet to the coast of Munster in Ireland in June 1563 to go privateering against French, Spanish and Portuguese ships. After repeated remonstrances on the part of the offended powers, Elizabeth disavowed Stucley and sent a naval force under the command of Sir Peter Carew to arrest him. One of his ships was taken in Cork haven, and Stucley surrendered, but he was acquitted once again, with O'Neill pleading his case through diplomatic channels.

=== Ireland ===
The meeting with O'Neill led to an extended interest in Irish affairs on Stucley's part. He was recommended by the queen to the Lord Lieutenant of Ireland, Sir Thomas Radclyffe, Earl of Sussex, on 30 June 1563, and in 1566 was employed as a captain by the Lord Deputy, Sir Henry Sidney, in a vain effort to induce O'Neill to enter into negotiations with the government. The Ulster lord sought to use him as intermediary with Sidney and in the same year requested his presence in fighting the Scots, an arrangement favoured by the lord deputy. Sidney then sought permission of the crown for Stucley to purchase the estates and office of Sir Nicholas Bagenal, marshal of Ireland, for £3,000, but Elizabeth refused to permit the transaction. The lands lay mostly in the east of Ulster, a territory anciently in Hiberno-Norman possession, which was much fought over by the Irish and Scots, and would be used by the English within a decade as a base for their efforts at colonisation of the province (see Plantations of Ireland#Early plantations (1556–1576)).

Undeterred by this failure, Stucley was appointed seneschal of Kavanagh's country in south-east Leinster, and had some say in the controversial land claims of his adversary, Peter Carew (who succeeded him in that office). He went on to buy lands from Sir Nicholas Heron in the adjacent County Wexford, and was appointed by Sidney to the office of seneschal there, but the queen objected to the appointment and in June 1568 he was dismissed in favour of Sir Nicholas White. Stucley had fallen prey to the disputes between Sidney and White's patron, the Earl of Ormonde, which resulted, in the following year, in Elizabeth rebuking Sidney for his use of Stucley in the negotiations with O'Neill. In June 1569 Stucley was committed to custody in Dublin Castle for 18 weeks, on White's claim that he had used 'coarse language' against the queen and supported 'certain rebels'.

=== Spain ===
Again, Stucley was acquitted, and the authorities released him in October 1569. He had been suspected of proposing an invasion of Ireland to King Philip II of Spain, and soon after his release he offered his services to Fénelon, the French ambassador in London. He returned to Ireland in 1570, where he fitted out a ship at Waterford and made a great show of his piety, proceeding through the streets of the city on his knees as he offered himself up to God. He then sailed from Waterford on 17 April, supposedly for London, but his real destination was Vimeiro, northwest of Lisbon. He had 28 men on board, but only the sole Italian knew their course, and the rest fell into despair when they arrived in Portugal after a five-day voyage.

Philip II invited him to Madrid, where he was loaded with honours, probably with a view to impressing upon Elizabeth the threat of an invasion of Ireland to detract from English support for the Dutch rebels in the Netherlands. With the approbation of the Duke of Feria, Stucley was known at the Spanish court as the "Duke of Ireland", and was established with an allowance in a villa near Madrid.

Speculation about Stucley's future role became intense. In 1570, it was claimed that he had sought to interfere in the Ridolfi Plot with an attack on Ireland in the following year during the planned invasion of England from Flanders. The Irish invasion was to have been aided by the Plymouth fleet of Sir John Hawkins, who betrayed the supposed plot to the privy council, leading to the arrest of the Thomas Howard, 4th Duke of Norfolk.

On 12 February 1571, the king was informed by the Spanish ambassador that news was had in London from France that the pope had ceded to the Spanish crown the kingdom created for Philip and Queen Mary I, which had fallen vacant upon the excommunication of Elizabeth by Pope Pius V, in his 1570 papal bull Regnans in Excelsis, and that it was rumoured that Stucley was to be sent to England with 14 to 15 companies of troops.

Amidst this international feinting and shaping, the Catholic Archbishop of Cashel, Maurice Reagh Fitzgibbon – an ally of the Irish leader in Munster James Fitzmaurice Fitzgerald – made some effort while in Spain to discredit Stucley's ambitions, much to the displeasure of Feria, and was supported by the Duke of Alba, who dismissed the proposed invasion on the ground that once England fell, Ireland would fall of itself.

The archbishop's brief was to request the appointment of John of Austria, nicknamed Don John, as king of Ireland. On removing to Paris, Fitzgibbon informed the English ambassador there, Sir Francis Walsingham, of Stucley's plan. In 1570, Stucley sought to have an English spy, Oliver King, brought before the Spanish Inquisition. King had a history of attendance at Mass and of knocking his breast daily and so was merely stripped and banished, but then had to cross the Pyrenees in the snow while Stucley's men pursued him. Stucley obtained his passport to leave Spain after Elizabeth demanded his dismissal.

Stucley moved to Rome, where he found favour with Pope Pius V, who had excommunicated Elizabeth in 1571. He was given the command of three galleys at the Battle of Lepanto (7 October 1571), and showed great valour. It was a crucial victory for the Holy League over the Ottoman Empire of Selim II, and allowed Spain to devote more resources to its campaigns in northern Europe.

Stucley's exploits restored him to favour in Madrid, and by the end of March 1572 he was at Seville, offering to hold the narrow seas against the English with a fleet of twenty ships. In four years (1570–1574) he is said to have received over 27,000 ducats from Philip II of Spain, but wearied by the king's delays he sought more serious assistance from the new pope, Gregory XIII, who aspired to make his son Giacomo Boncompagni King of Ireland.

=== Rome ===
Stucley allied with Fitzmaurice and moved to Rome in 1575, where he is said to have walked about the streets and churches barefoot and bare-legged. In June, Stucley had an interview at Naples with his Lepanto commander Don John, and passed on details of the plans for an October expedition. The intention was to deliver Mary, Queen of Scots, from prison and take possession of England. Don John, who was now in charge of the Spanish forces in Flanders, said the king would have to approve, and that 3,000 men were too few, but was cautiously optimistic that the expedition would help to contain the rebellion in the Netherlands.

In 1575, Friar Patrick O'Healy arrived at Rome bearing a letter from the king and announcing that he sought sanction for an unnamed Irish gentleman to revolt and to request assistance; he insisted Philip II had given his blessing. Pope Gregory stressed that the crown ought not to go to a French or Spanish claimant, but to a native Catholic, that is, Mary, Queen of Scots, lest the king gain too much power and territory; he was opposed to Don John being crowned in Ireland. The king disputed O'Healy's authority to enter discussion on the Irish matter and queried the Pope's opposition to the increase of Spanish authority.

The Pope was willing to guarantee six months' pay for 200 men and their shipping expenses to go to England in his name, and wondered if a personal attempt might be made against Elizabeth. Later, it was suggested that 5,000 go to Liverpool and free Mary before possessing the country, or go to Ireland. Pope Gregory bargained for Philip II to defray the entire expense of the expedition, and suggested that if the Vatican were to pitch in then it should receive some benefit in Italy by way of material return. The Spanish thought the leader of the expedition should be married, so as to prevent papal approval of a match with Mary.

British spies had been sending home rumours of Stucley's plans since Archbishop Fitzgibbon's intervention in Spain. In 1572, Oliver King informed London of invasion plans; in March 1573 Elizabeth's spymaster Sir William Cecil, Lord Burghley, received intelligence that certain "decayed gentlemen" were to join Stucley in Spain for the invasion of Ireland. At their first encounter, Walsingham had not known what to make of Fitzgibbon, realising that an agent of Burghley's had sown dissension between the archbishop and Stucley, but in 1575 he did have intelligence of Stucley's alliance with Fitzmaurice, at a time when the nuncio at Madrid was urging an invasion of England. In 1578 Walsingham had similar intelligence, and having failed to induce Archbishop Fitzgibbon to give up his secrets in return for his passage back to Ireland, procured his arrest in Scotland.

=== Invasion expedition ===
On 1 October 1578, Don John died while on campaign in southern Belgium, of camp fever (typhus). His death disrupted plans for the invasion of England, but there was still stomach for supporting the Irish. In 1576 Fitzmaurice had been warmly received at Rome, where William Allen, later a cardinal, was also present, having presented to the Pope a plot for the invasion of England through Liverpool, with 5,000 musketeers under Stucley's command.

Now, in 1578, the Pope provided Stucley with infantry and he set out with 2,000 fighting men. The force had, it was claimed, been raised by enlisting Apennine highwaymen and robbers in return for pardons and 50-day indulgences, the latter to be gained by contemplation of crucifixes supplied to Stucley. They were commanded by professional officers under Hercules of Pisano, and also Giuseppi who went on to command the Smerwick garrison at the beginning of the Second Desmond Rebellion. In sum, Stucley's ranks rose to 4,000.

Stucley sailed for Ireland from Civitavecchia in March 1578. In April, he reached Cádiz with rotted ships, where he issued magnificent passports to Irishmen returning home, describing himself as Marquess of Leinster (a title bestowed by the Pope). Philip II sent him on to Lisbon, where he was to meet Fitzmaurice and secure better ships before sailing for Ireland.

Here, King Sebastian of Portugal invited Stucley to take up a command in his army, which included Portuguese and German mercenaries, in preparation for an invasion of Morocco (an ally of England against Spain) in an attack upon the Moors. Stucley abandoned the Irish invasion, and destroyed the hopes of help in Munster. Stucley is said to have declared that he knew Ireland as well as the best and that there were only to be got there "hunger and lice".

The Jesuit polemicist Nicholas Sanders and Irish members of the expedition made their way back to Rome, and continued the now ill-fated invasion, deprived of most of its money and men by Stucley's desertion.

On landing in Morocco, Stucley objected to marching straight away against a vast force of Moors and scorned the Portuguese king's troops and tactics. He reportedly fought with courage on 4 August 1578 at the Battle of Alcácer Quibir, commanding the centre, but was killed early in the day when a cannonball cut off his legs—or perhaps, as tradition asserted, he was murdered by his Italian soldiers after the Portuguese had been defeated. The historian Jerry Brotton writes of him, "He might not have 'given a fart' about Elizabeth, but it may have been one of her cannonballs that killed him".

== Legacy ==
Stucley's career made a considerable impression on his contemporaries, and in death he attracted as much speculation and gossip as he had in life. A play generally assigned to George Peele, The Battell of Alcazar with the Death of Captain Stukely, printed in 1594, was probably acted in 1592. It deals with Stucley's arrival in Lisbon and his Moorish expedition; in a long speech before his death he recapitulates the events of his life.

A later piece, The Famous History of the Life and Death of Captain Thomas Stukeley, printed for Thomas Pavier (1605), which is possibly the Stewtle, played, according to Henslowe, on 11 December 1596, is a biographical piece dealing with successive episodes, and seems to be a patchwork of older plays on Dom António and on Stucley. His adventures also form the subject of various ballads.

There is a detailed biography of Stucley, based chiefly on the English, Venetian and Spanish state papers, in R Simpson's edition of the 1605 play (School of Shakespeare, 1878, vol. i.), where the Stucley ballads are also printed. References in contemporary poetry are quoted by Dyce in his introduction to The Battle of Alcazar in Peele's Works.

== Sources ==
- T. Wright The History of Ireland v.II pp. 461 et seq.
- Richard Bagwell, Ireland under the Tudors 3 vols. (London, 1885–1890)
- John O'Donovan (ed.) Annals of Ireland by the Four Masters (1851).
- Calendar of State Papers: Carew MSS 6 vols (London, 1867–1873).
- Calendar of State Papers: Ireland (London)
- Nicholas Canny The Elizabethan Conquest of Ireland (Dublin, 1976); Kingdom and Colony (2002)
- Steven G. Ellis Tudor Ireland (London, 1985) ISBN 0-582-49341-2
- Cyril Falls Elizabeth's Irish Wars (1950; reprint London, 1996) ISBN 0-09-477220-7
- Pollard, Albert (1898). "Stucley, Thomas" . In Lee, Sidney (ed.). Dictionary of National Biography. Vol. 55. London: Smith, Elder & Co. pp. 123–126.
- Hart, Kelly (2009). The Mistresses of Henry VIII. The History Press. ISBN 978-0-7524-4835-0.
- Vivian, Lt.Col. J.L., (Ed.) The Visitations of the County of Devon: Comprising the Heralds' Visitations of 1531, 1564 & 1620, Exeter, 1895.
