= George Bampfylde, 4th Baron Poltimore =

British peer and landowner (1882-1965)

The Right Honourable The Lord Poltimore
- Born: 23 September 1882; Devon, England
- Died: 13 July 1965 (aged 82); Benwell, Southern Rhodesia
- Education: Eton College
- Alma mater: New College, Oxford
- Occupation: Landowner
- Spouses: Cynthia Rachel Lascelles (m. 1910; died 1961) Barbara Pitcairn Nicol (m. 1962)
- Children: 1 son, 1 daughter
- Parents: Coplestone Richard George Warwick Bampfylde, 3rd Baron Poltimore (father); Hon. Margaret Harriet Beaumont (mother)
- Military career
- Branch: British Army
- Rank: Major
- Units: Grenadier Guards; Royal North Devon Yeomanry
- Conflicts: World War I

George Wentworth Warwick Bampfylde, 4th Baron Poltimore (1882–1965) (and 9th Baronet) of Poltimore and North Molton, Devon, was a peer and major landowner in Devonshire, whose family had been seated at Poltimore from about 1300. He was a Justice of the Peace for Devon and occupied the honorary position of High Steward of South Molton, Devon.

== Origins ==
He was born on 23 September 1882, the eldest son and heir of Coplestone Richard George Warwick Bampfylde, 3rd Baron Poltimore (1859–1918) by his wife Hon. Margaret Harriet Beaumont (died 1931), daughter of Wentworth Blackett Beaumont, 1st Baron Allendale (1829–1907).

== Career ==
He was educated at Eton College and at New College, Oxford, where in 1910 he gained a half blue in polo winning 10–2 against Cambridge. He served as Lieutenant in the Grenadier Guards. He fought in World War I and was twice mentioned in despatches. He served in the Quartermaster-General's staff and in the Lincolnshire Yeomanry and was a Major in the Royal North Devon Yeomanry. He served as a Justice of the Peace for Devon and held the honorary office of High Steward of South Molton, near his seat of North Molton.

=== Master of Fox Hounds ===
He was Master of the Dulverton Foxhounds, Somerset, whose territory covered his North Molton estate, between 1920 and 1963. The fox-hunting season always commenced with a meet at Court House, his home, but he was strict to ensure that no hunting commenced before his tenant farmers had harvested their wheat, so as not to damage the crop. Today the Dulverton (west) Foxhounds continue to hold the popular annual Boxing Day meet at the Poltimore Arms, Yarde Down, and their New Year's Day meet at the Poltimore Inn on North Molton Square, near Court House.

=== 1930's Agricultural Depression ===
During the agricultural depression of 1930s his agricultural tenants at North Molton struggled to pay their rents, and Lord Poltimore displayed his own austerity at that time by wearing patched up breeches rather than buying new ones.

== Marriages and children ==
Bampfylde's first wife was Cynthia Rachel Lascelles. They married in 1910. She was the daughter of Hon. Gerald William Lascelles by his wife Constance Augusta Mary Fitz Clarence Phillipson, a younger son of the Earl of Harewood. She is remembered by North Molton residents as having hired buses to take the local children to Woollacombe Beach in the summer and to pantomimes in Exeter at Christmas. She died in 1961. In 1962 he married Barbara Pitcairn Nicol, daughter of Peter Nicol of Kirkintilloch, Scotland.

He had two children by his first wife.

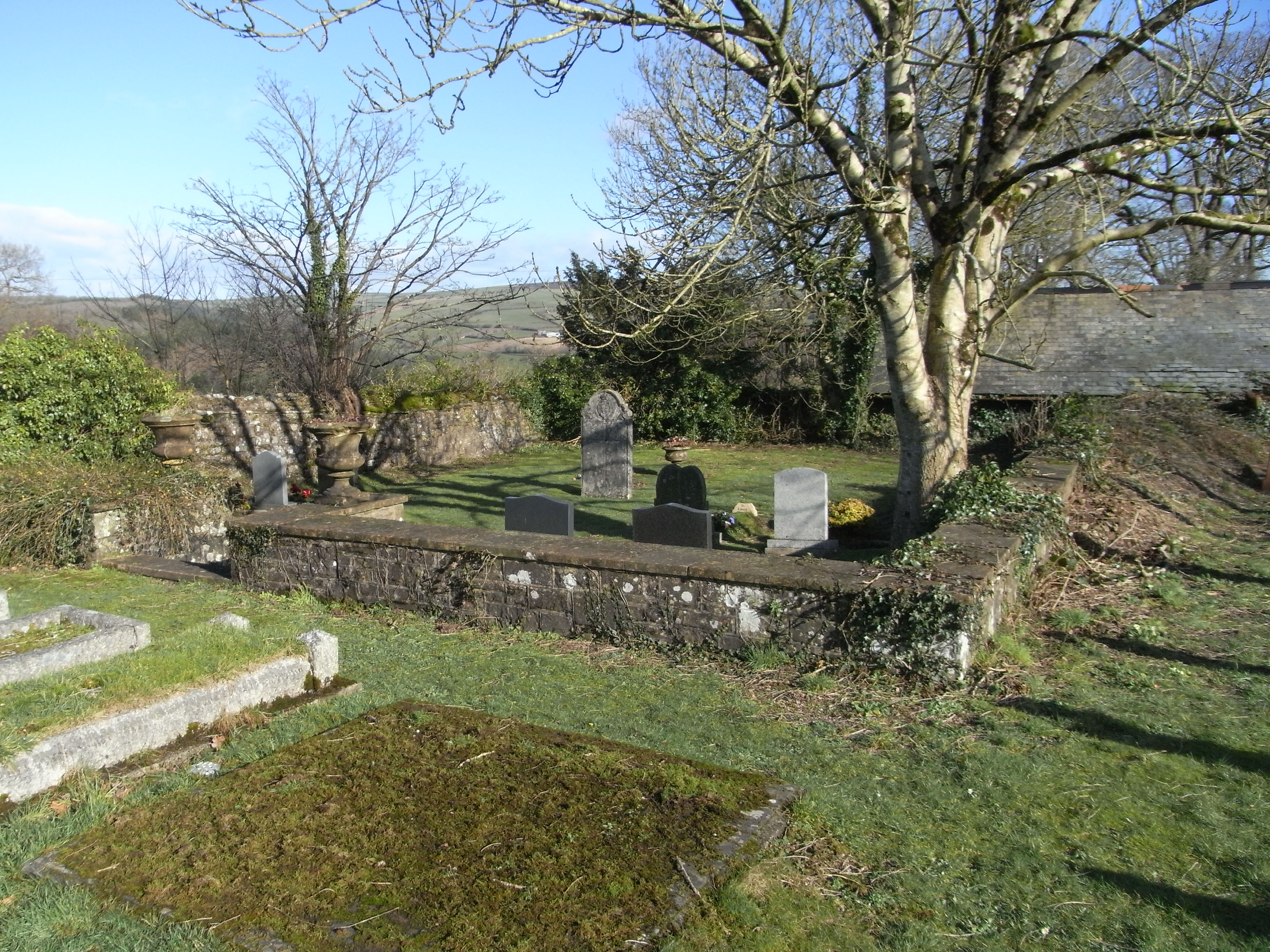
Bampfylde Memorial Garden, North Molton churchyard, in memory of Hon. (Coplestone) John de Grey Warwick Bampfylde (1914–1936), looking eastward to Exmoor. The memorial stone bench to his father the 4th Baron Poltimore sits at the base of the large tree. The roof of an outbuilding of Court House, the Bampfyldes' manor house, is visible behind the garden

- Their only son and heir apparent, Hon. (Coplestone) John de Grey Warwick Bampfylde (1914–1936), was an officer in the Royal Horseguards, who died aged 23 in a horse-racing accident shortly after representing his country as a member of the 1936 Berlin Olympic Games fencing team. A memorial black and white photographic portrait of him in full military dress exists in the Bampfylde Chapel of North Molton Church. The Bampfylde Memorial Garden in North Molton churchyard was created in his memory, being a walled and sunken lawned garden, in the centre of which stands his gravestone inscribed as follows: In memory of Coplestone John de Grey Warwick Bampfylde, Royal Horse Guards, beloved only son of the 4th Baron Poltimore. Died 3 October 1936 in his 23rd year. So he passed over and all the trumpets sounded for him on the other side. In recent years the garden has received burials of villagers of North Molton, as space in the churchyard has become scarce.
- Their daughter, Hon. Sheila Margaret Warwick Bampfylde (born 1912, died 1996), married Sir Dennis Stucley, 5th Baronet (1907–1983) of Affeton Castle and Hartland Abbey in Devon, by whom she had children, including a son and heir, Sir Hugh George Copplestone Bampfylde Stucley, 6th Baronet (born 1945), and a daughter Chryssie Lytton Cobbold, Baroness Cobbold (1940–2024).

== Emigration to Rhodesia ==
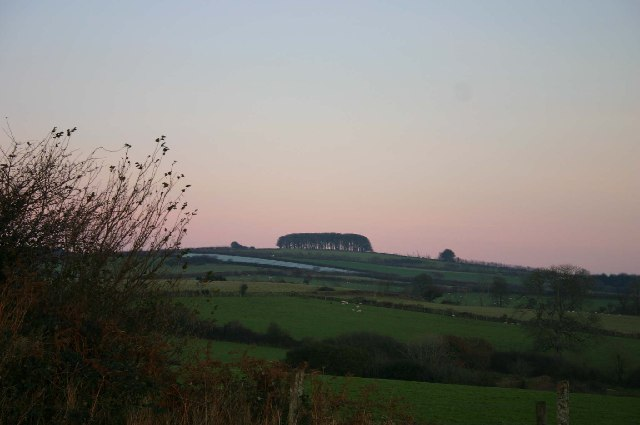
Bampfylde Clump, North Molton, said to have been deserted by the rookery following Lord Poltimore's emigration to Rhodesia

After World War II, Bampfylde sold most of the 5,000 acre North Molton estate, owned by his family for about 400 years, and its many farmsteads to his tenant farmers. He moved to Rhodesia, where he lived the rest of his life on his estate of Benwell, near Bindura. He never returned to England, and it was said that on his departure from North Molton the rooks deserted Bampfylde Clump, a landmark clump of beech trees on his estate planted by his ancestors. His move to Africa has been attributed to several factors: the accidental death in 1936 of his only son and heir apparent, poor health, arthritis (possibly caused by a lifetime spent hunting) and the victory of the Labour Government under Clement Attlee in 1945.

== Death and burial ==
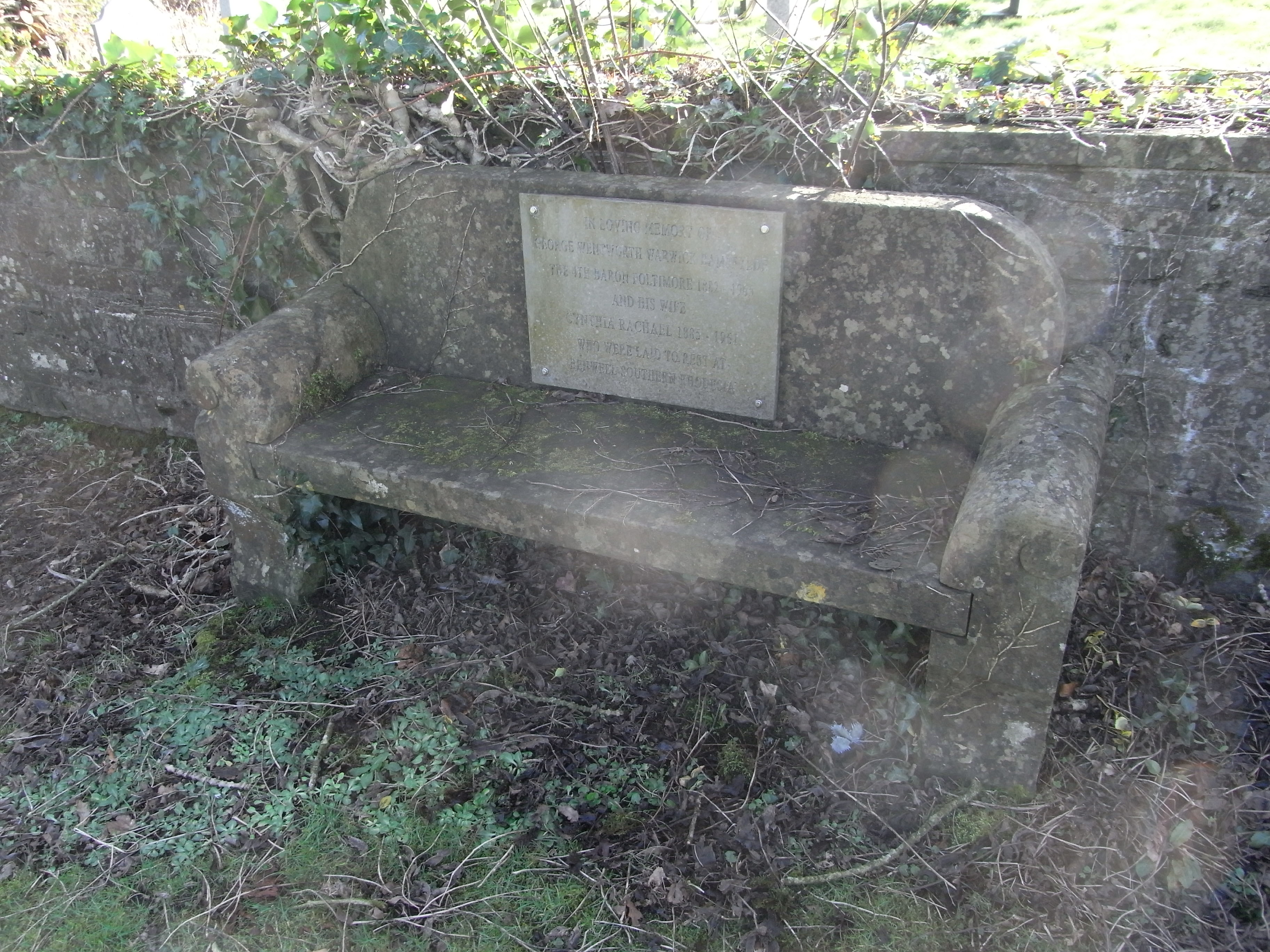
Memorial stone bench to the 4th Baron Poltimore in the Bampfylde Memorial Garden, North Molton, created in memory of his only son and heir

He died on 13 July 1965 at age 82 and was buried at Benwell, Southern Rhodesia, Africa. A memorial stone bench exists in the Bampfylde Memorial Garden created for his son in North Molton churchyard, next to Court House, his manor house, to which is affixed a tablet inscribed:

"In loving memory of George Wentworth Warwick Bampfylde the 4th Baron Poltimore 1882–1965 and his wife Cynthia Rachael 1885–1961 who were laid to rest at Benwell Southern Rhodesia".

== Landholdings ==
In 1920 Bampfylde sold the Poltimore estate, but the house and grounds failed to find a buyer. The house was let to Poltimore College, a girls' school which closed in 1939. In 1940 the boys from Dover College were evacuated to Poltimore House, which became a private hospital in 1945. When the National Health Service came into existence in 1948, it took over the hospital. It closed as a hospital in 1974. Bampfylde gave the remnant of the North Molton estate, about a third of his former holding including Court House, to his daughter (by his first wife) Hon. Sheila Margaret Warwick Bampfylde, the wife of Sir Dennis Stucley, 5th Baronet (1907–1983) of Affeton Castle and Hartland Abbey in Devon. Stucley, a keen sportsman, made Court House at North Molton his preferred residence due to the Bampfyldes' renowned pheasant shoot which he further developed. Today Stucley's descendants operate the shoot on a commercial basis and reside at Court House and on other properties on the estate.

Peerage of the United Kingdom
Preceded by Coplestone Bampfylde	Baron Poltimore; 1918–1965	Succeeded by Arthur Bampfylde
