= Worlington =

Worlington may refer to:

- Worlington, Devon, village in Devon, England.
- Worlington, Suffolk, village in Suffolk, England

== See also ==
- East Worlington, village in Devon, England
- West Worlington, village in Devon, England
