= The Life and Death of the Famous Thomas Stukely =

English broadside ballad

Song
- Published: 17th-18th century
- Genre: Broadside ballad

The Life and Death of the Famous Thomas Stukely is an English broadside ballad from the 17th-18th century. It tells the story of Thomas Stukely, an English soldier of fortune who runs through his wife's inheritance and then flees to Italy before dying in the Battle of the Three Kings and asking forgiveness for all the wrongs he has committed against his wife, his friends, and his country. Copies of the broadside can be found in the British Library, the National Library of Scotland, Magdalene College, Cambridge, and the Huntington Library.

== Synopsis ==
The ballad tells the story of Thomas Stukely, an English gentleman who dies in the battle of the Three Kings of Barbary. He is a wealthy clothier's son who gains the hand of an alderman's daughter by the name of Curtis. When her father dies, he spends £100 a day on drinks with his friends, and sells the blocks of tin that old Curtis had used to pave his yard. Bankrupt, he goes to Italy, and begins spending time with a rich woman there. While in Italy, he gets news of the Battle of Three Kings between the King of Portugal, Sebastian I, the deposed Moroccan Sultan, Abu Abdallah Mohammed II, and the new Moroccan Sultan, Abd Al-Malik I. Stukely decides to go to Northern Morocco to fight in the battle for the Christian King Sebastian, and a number of gallants follow him into battle. All three kings and 120,000 soldiers die in the battle, including Stukely. As he dies, Stukely regrets having brought so many of his friends to death in the battle, and also asks his wife to forgive him for all the wrongs he has done to her. After death, he is pardoned and honored, and a monument is built on his grave.

== Historical and cultural significance ==
The ballad gives a curiously partial story of Thomas Stukely's life, as critics have pointed out. According to J.W.M. Gibbs, the ballad suggests that Stukely's marriage to Anne Curtis was the "beginning of his public life," though he was already an experienced captain (including fighting in two sieges of Bologne and serving in the French army). Ambrose Philips wonders why the author of the ballad accuses Stukely of wasteful spending and abandoning his wife, but fails to mention that Stukely had committed treason against the Queen by aligning himself with Ireland, Spain, and Pope Gregory XIII.

Karen Ordahl Kupperman reads the ballad within the context of a popular genre of the 16th century: "dramas in which men rose above their circumstances by uncommon exploits abroad." She sees the ballad as following in the footsteps of earlier plays about Stukely's life, including The Battle of Alcazar, fought in Barbari betweene Sebastian king of Portugall, and Abdelmelec king of Marocco With the death of Captaine Stukeley (1594) by George Peele and the anonymous The Famous Historye of the life and death of Captaine Thomas Stukeley. With his marriage to Alderman Curteis Daughter, and valiant ending of his life at the Battaile of Alcazar (1600). These plays were the prototypes of her main subject, Captain John Smith's The Generall Historie of Virginia, New-England, and the Summer Isles (1624), the works of Sir Walter Raleigh, and the Stukely ballads of the 17th century. The difference between Stukely and Raleigh, according to Kupperman, is that Raleigh wrote of his exploits abroad. Had Stukely done the same, he may have found fame while alive, instead of after he died. Instead of self-published works, Stukely's fame came after his death through the ballads and plays celebrating his life J.W.M. Gibbs also suggests that the ballad is based, at least partially, on the earlier Stukely plays. However, as Leonard Ashley points out, a vibrant ballad tradition was already romanticizing Stukely prior to the Stukely plays, and that Peele drew on this tradition in his own version of Thomas Stukely, which was based on fact but took great advantage of poetic license.
