= Bideford Town Hall =

Municipal building in Bideford, Devon, England

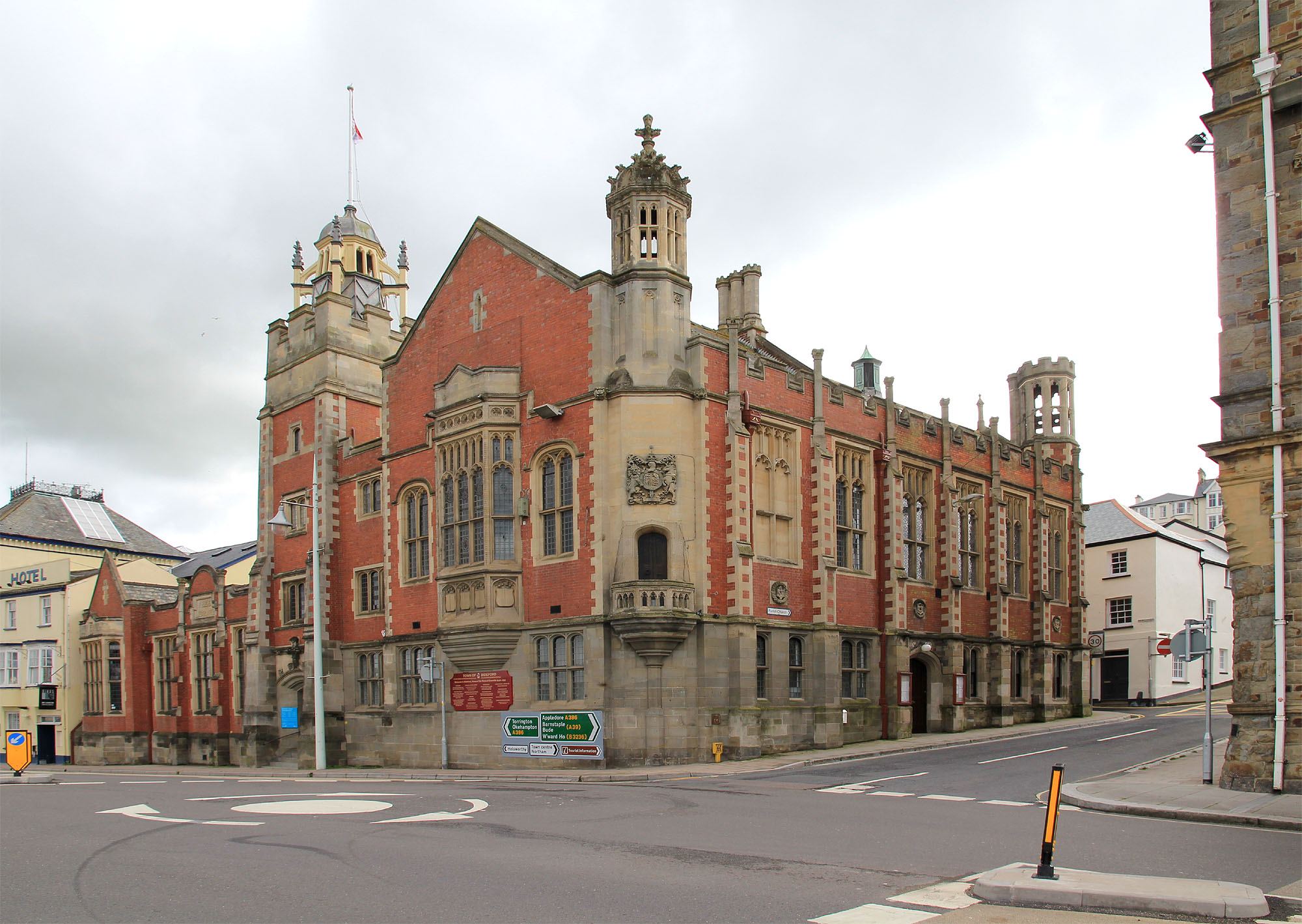
- Bideford Town Hall

- Shown in Devon
- 51.0167°N 4.2050°W
- Location: Bideford

History
- Built: 1851; 175 years ago

Site notes
- Architect(s): Richard Davie Gould and Alfred Dunn
- Architectural style: Elizabethan style

Listed Building – Grade II
- Official name: Town Hall and Public Library
- Designated: 19 March 1973
- Reference no.: 1200934

Bideford Town Hall is a municipal building at the corner of Bridge Street and New Road in Bideford, Devon, England. The building, which is the meeting place of Bideford Town Council and is also used for some meetings of Torridge District Council, is a Grade II listed building.

== History ==
A medieval town hall in Bideford was the venue for the "court of inquisition" on 3 July 1682 into the activities of Temperance Lloyd, Susannah Edwards and Mary Trembles, who were all hanged on 25 August 1682, the last three women to be executed for witchcraft in England. A second town hall in the town, which accommodated cells in the basement for both criminals and debtors, was completed in 1698. In the early 19th century the local borough council met in the old Bridge Hall on the north side of Bridge Street, which had been rebuilt in 1758.

The current town hall building was designed by Richard Davie Gould in the Elizabethan style and officially opened in 1851. The original design involved an asymmetrical main frontage with four bays facing onto Bridge Street (the right hand section of the current structure); it featured an arched doorway in the left hand bay and Tudor style windows in the other bays, flanked by full-height buttresses, with mullion windows on the first floor and crenelation above. The corner of Bridge Street and Church Walk was canted and featured a coat of arms with a turret above. Internally, the principal room was the courtroom on the first floor. Meanwhile, Bridge Hall was replaced with Bridge Buildings, which featured a sundial inscribed with the words, "The Sun to us the sign gives", in 1882.

Following the demolition in July 1904 of Thomas Hogg's chemist's shop, which had dated back to the early 19th century and had stood on the corner of New Road and Bridge Street, the town hall was extended along New Road by H. Glover and Sons of Bideford to a design by Alfred Dunn in a similar style to the original town hall in 1905. The left section of the extension involved a four-bay public library; the centre section involved a tower with an entrance to the library on the ground floor and a turret above and the right hand section, referred to as the "municipal buildings", featured a large oriel window on the first floor. The corner of New Road and Bridge Street was also canted and featured a balcony on the first floor with a coat of arms and turret above. The extension also created an extra two bays on the Bridge Street elevation (the left hand section of the current structure). A plaque was placed on this section to commemorate the lives of the three women who had been executed for witchcraft. Internally, the principal room in the extension was the council chamber.

Three carved shields bearing the arms, which had been granted to the Bideford Borough Council, were fixed to the Bridge Street elevation of the town hall in April 1937.

The town hall continued to serve as the headquarters of Bideford Borough Council until local government reorganisation in 1974 saw that council replaced by the larger Torridge District Council, which also based itself at the town hall. Torridge District Council bought Riverbank House in Bideford to serve as its main offices in 1988, but continues to use the town hall for council and committee meetings, although full council meetings have tended to be held in larger venues since the COVID-19 pandemic. The building also became the meeting place of Bideford Town Council, the parish-level authority set up in 1974 covering the area of the former borough.

Works of art in the own hall include a portrait by Edmund Dyer of Admiral Sir Richard Grenville, who died in command of Revenge at the Battle of Flores in August 1591 during the Anglo-Spanish War, and a portrait by George Romney of George Stucley Buck, who was the father of Lewis William Buck MP.
