= Affeton Castle =

Castle in East Worlington, Devon, England

- Devon, England
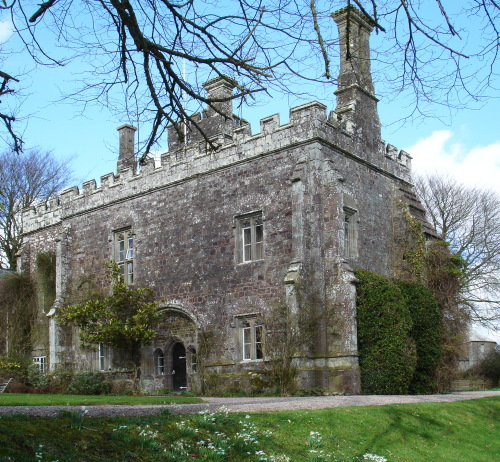
- Affeton Castle

Site information
- Type: Fortified manor house
- Open to the public: No

Location
- Shown within Devon
- Coordinates: 50.9092°N 3.7717°W

Site history
- Materials: Grey stone rubble

Affeton Castle is a converted late-medieval gatehouse near East Worlington, Devon, England. It was formerly part of the fortified manor house of Affeton, built by the Stucley family in about 1434, and situated on the side of a valley of the Little Dart River. The manor house was destroyed in the English Civil War of the 1640s, and by the early 19th century the gatehouse was in ruins. It was restored between 1868 and 1869 by Sir George Stucley, 1st Baronet for use as a shooting box or hunting lodge; in 1956, it was converted to form the private home of Sir Dennis Stucley, 5th Baronet. The castle, approximately 60 feet (18 m) by 22 feet (6.7 m) in size, is protected as a Grade II* listed building.

== History ==
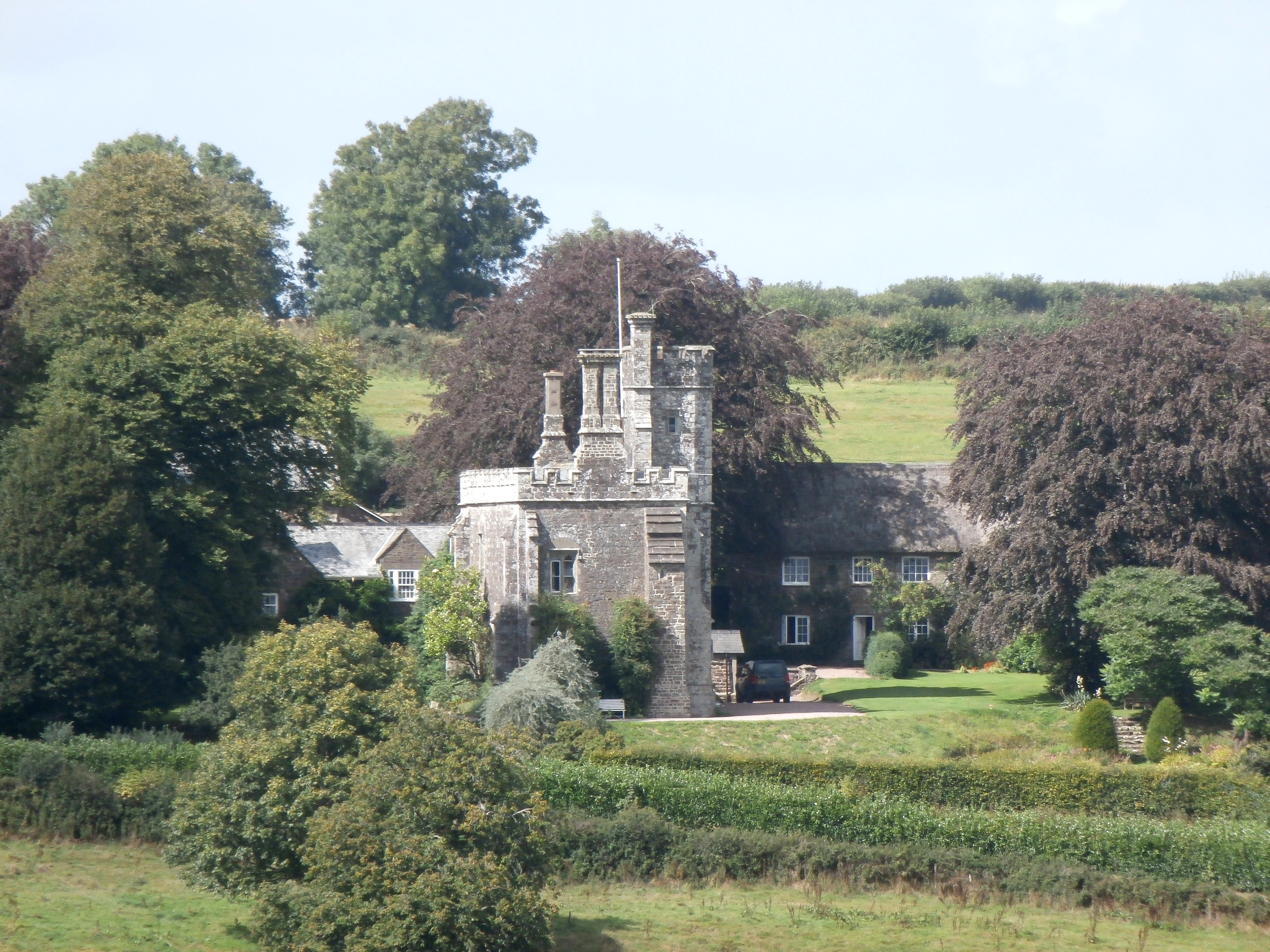
Affeton Castle

Affeton Castle formed part of a large fortified manor house built from grey rubble stone by the Stucley family in about 1434. Affeton manor was at one time also a parish with its own parish church, but was later merged into the parish of West Worlington. The manor house was almost entirely demolished in the English Civil War, the only part left standing was the gatehouse, which fell into ruin. A large farmhouse known as Affeton Barton was built over the foundations and cellars of the manor house. The ruinous gatehouse was converted in 1868–9 to a shooting box for the use of the Stucley family of Hartland Abbey and Moreton House, Bideford, and later became known as Affeton Castle.

The Stucley family acquired the Affeton estate when Hugh Stucley, Sheriff of Devon in 1448, married the heiress Catherine de Affeton. It measures approximately 60 feet (18 m) by 22 feet (6.7 m). It formed a major part of the defences of the house, and incorporates a tall arch, now partly filled in to form a smaller front door, through which persons and vehicles passed to gain access to the inner courtyard.

The gatehouse was restored in 1868–9 by Sir George Stucley, 1st Baronet (1812–1900) - originally called George Buck, until he became the first of the Stucley baronets - to create a shooting-box for grouse shooting on nearby Affeton Moor within the estate. The castle was inherited by Lt.-Col. Sir William Stucley (1836–1911), Sir Edward Stucley (1852–1927) and Sir Hugh Stucley, 4th Baronet (1873–1956), who lived at Moreton House.

The 4th Baronet gave Affeton Castle to his son, Sir Dennis Stucley, 5th Baronet (1907–1983), in 1947. In 1956, Moreton Hall was sold off, and Affeton Castle became the main private residence of the Stucley baronets. Sir Dennis installed two bathrooms in the castle, where previously there were none. Sir Hugh Stucley, 6th Baronet (born 1945), lives in the castle in the 21st century, which is not open to the public, unlike the family's other larger residence at Hartland Abbey. He has added an extension housing a nursery wing and additional bedrooms.

== See also ==
- Castles in Great Britain and Ireland
- List of castles in England

== Bibliography ==
- Emery, Anthony. (2006) Greater Medieval Houses of England and Wales, 1300–1500: Southern England. Cambridge, UK: Cambridge University Press. ISBN 978-0-521-58132-5.
- Lauder, Rosemary. (2002) Devon Families. Tiverton, UK: Halsgrove. ISBN 9781841141404.
- Pettifer, Adrian. (2002) English Castles: a Guide by Counties. Woodbridge, UK: Boydell Press. ISBN 978-0-85115-782-5.
- Stucley, Dennis. (1976) "A Devon Parish Lost, A new Home Discovered", in Transactions of the Devonshire Association, no. 108, pp. 1–11.
- Vivian, J. L. (ed) (1895) The Visitations of the County of Devon: Comprising the Heralds' Visitations of 1531, 1564 and 1620. Exeter, UK: H.S. Eland. OCLC 3674935.
