= West Worlington =

Village in Devon, England

Coordinates: 50°54′N 3°46′W

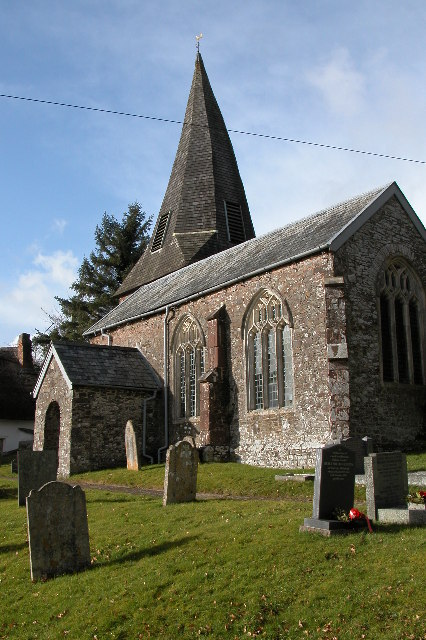

- Location within Devon
- Civil parish: East Worlington
- District: North Devon
- Shire county: Devon
- Region: South West
- Country: England
- Sovereign state: United Kingdom

West Worlington is a small village and former civil and ecclesiastical parish, now in the civil parish of East Worlington, in the North Devon district, in the county of Devon, England. It is situated about 2 miles west of Witheridge. In 1881 the parish had a population of 193. In the parish is the historic estate, formerly a separate parish, of Affeton, the ancient seat of the Stucley family. Through the parish flows the Little Dart River. The parish church is dedicated to St Mary. On 25 March 1885 the civil parish was merged with East Worlington, in 1919 it was merged into the ecclesiastical parish of East Worlington, the parish church of which is also dedicated to St Mary, to form a single ecclesiastical parish.

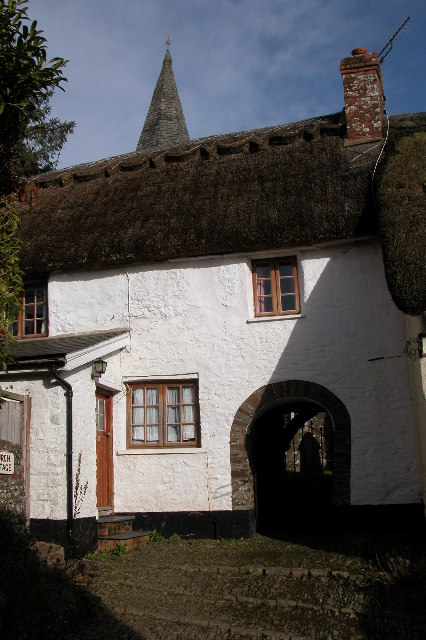
Church Cottage, West Worlington – the passageway through the cottage giving access to the church and graveyard
