= Hartland Abbey =

Historic country house in Devon, England

Coordinates: 50°59′48″N 4°30′31″W

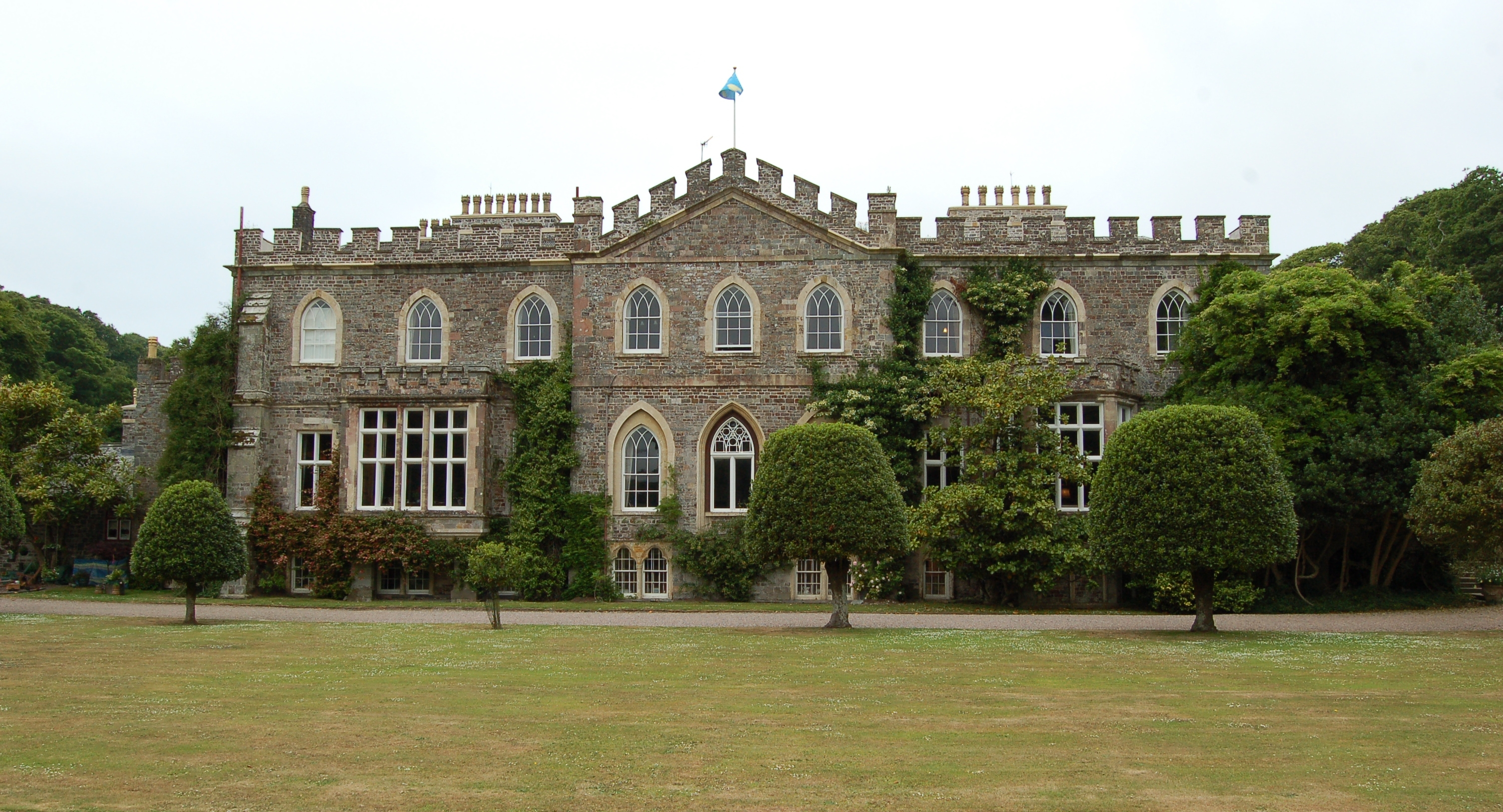
Hartland Abbey in 2010

Hartland Abbey is a former abbey and current family home to the Stucley family. It is located in Hartland, Devon. The current owner is Sir Hugh George Copplestone Bampfylde Stucley, 6th Baronet.

== History ==
Hartland Abbey was built in 1157 and consecrated by Bartholomew Iscanus in 1160. (Bartholomew was appointed Bishop of Exeter the following year.) Hartland was of the Augustinian order. The Botreaux family of Boscastle, Cornwall, were among the most generous donors to the Abbey. (Male heirs were apparently all named William, until the death in 1462 of the last of the line William de Botreaux, 3rd Baron Botreaux.) In 1187 a William de Botreaux gave the advowsons of the churches in his manors of Molland and Knowstone in Devon, and of the church of Forrabury in his Cornish manor of Boscastle, to the Abbey. The grants were confirmed by a charter temp. from King Richard I (1189-1199) and the property was converted into an Augustinian Abbey in 1189.

== Dissolution ==
In 1539 it was dissolved by Henry VIII. The King gave the building to William Abbot, his Sergeant of the Wine Cellar at Hampton Court. Along with the Priory at Bodmin, which Abbott soon sold to the use of that town. William Abbot converted what had been the Abbot's Lodging into a mansion. In September 1544 the following lands of "Hartland Priory" were granted, with other lands, by Henry VIII to Thomas Godwyne in fee, for a consideration of £1,122 2s 6d: "the messuage, etc., called Abbottes in the parish of Molland alias Batters Moland (i.e. "Molland Bottreaux"), Devon, in tenure of Anthony Deye and a messuage, etc., in Moore alias Moore Town, in Bedyford (i.e. Bideford) parish, Devon, in tenure of Richard Penhorewod" In March 1547 a royal licence was obtained by James Gunter and Henry Wescott, who presumably had been granted them on dissolution, to alienate the "rectory and advowson of the vicarage of Knoweston and Molland, Devon" to Hugh Culme.

== Present building ==
The present house incorporates a few components from Tudor times, including some fine wainscoting. The addition of two wings in 1705 are attributed to John Meadows, who also worked on Eggesford House and Arlington, on which commission he died. A fine interior exists and has examples from the 'Gothik' work of Batty Langley. The main ranges of the house were taken down to the level of the cloisters and rebuilt in the Strawberry Hill Gothic style, made popular by Lord Walpole. Further alterations were commissioned by Sir George Stucley in the mid-1800s. He engaged George Gilbert Scott and the building was remodelled to give a formal entrance through a new porch on the north end. Two bay windows were installed on the east frontage. Internally the drawing room and dining rooms were presented in a style similar to that found in the Palace of Westminster, each having fine wall panelling (Elizabethan in the dining room & entrance, linenfold in the drawing room). Both rooms have a series of painted murals by Alfred Beer of Exeter around the walls. These depict events in English and Irish history in which Sir George Stucley felt his ancestors were engaged. Alfred Beer was also commissioned to make the fine painted glass wedding window on the staircase. Sir George had the main passage decorated in a style and colours to represent the Alhambra Palace style which he had recently visited. Gilbert Scott engaged Richard Coad as his supervising architect on these improvements and the contractor was Pulsman of Barnstaple.

(the north-west corner being the work of 'Mr Mathews', according to the author of the Beauties of England and Wales). Further alterations were made in about 1860. The gardens were laid out by Gertrude Jekyll.

== Filming location ==
The Hartland Quay Hotel is part of the Estate and this location has also hosted many film crews, one of the earliest being for the Disney 1950 adaptation of Treasure Island.

The Blackpool cottage on the estate featured as Mrs Dashwood's home in the 2008 BBC mini-series Sense and Sensibility and was the location for a 2012 edition of BBC1's Antiques Roadshow. The cottage was also used as a location for the 2016 BBC/AMC mini-series The Night Manager.

The estate has also been used for the filming of Rosamunde Pilcher's novel The Shell Seekers, as well as for the failed game show Hercules, which lasted one series. Numerous other films have been made including a sequence in the BBC Top Gear programme and of the CBBC/Canadian production of children's TV series Malory Towers broadcast in 2020.
