= Stucley baronets =

Baronetcy in the Baronetage of the United Kingdom

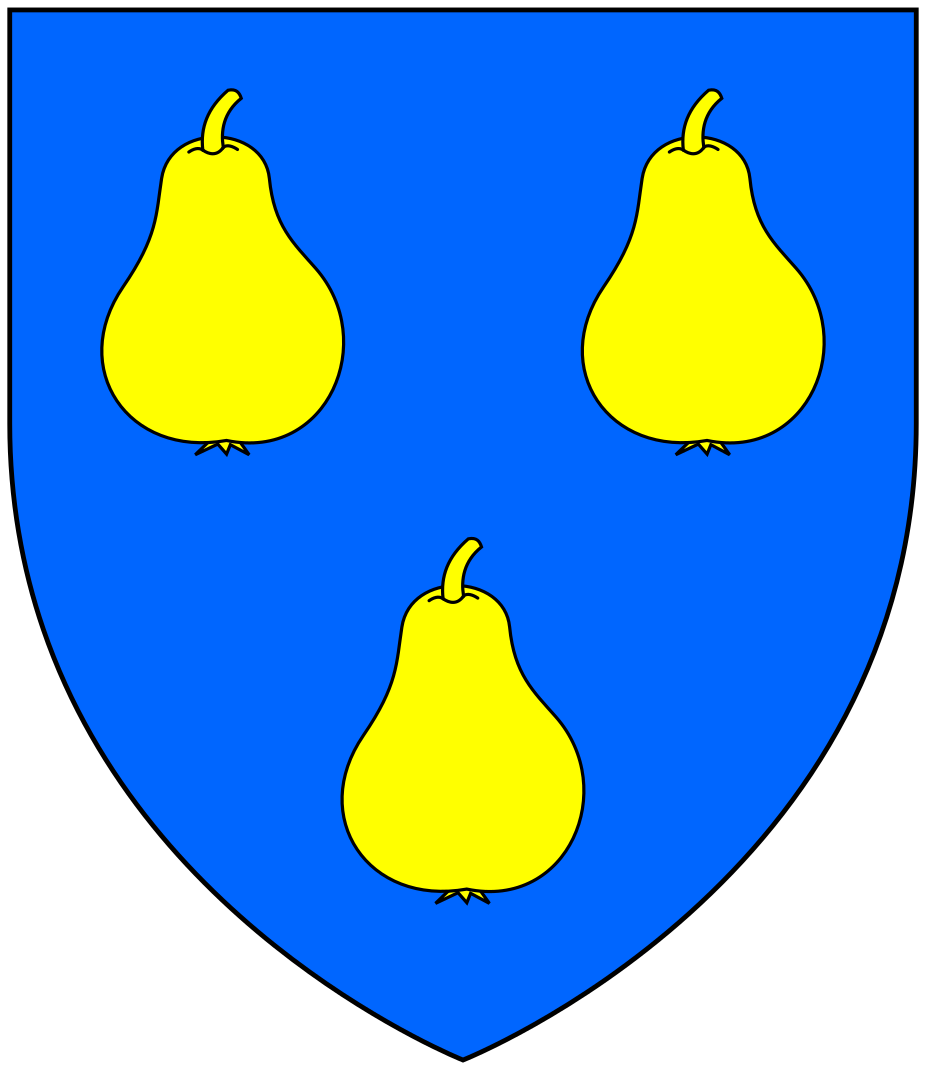
Arms of Stucley: Azure, three pears or. Motto: Bellement et Hardiment ("beautifully and bravely")

The Stucley Baronetcy, of Affeton Castle in the County of Devon, is a title in the Baronetage of the United Kingdom. It was created on 26 April 1859 for George Stucley, Conservative Member of Parliament for Barnstaple from 1855 to 1857. Born George Stucley Buck, he had assumed by Royal licence the surname of Stucley in lieu of his patronymic, on the death of his father, in 1858 as lineal representative of the ancient Stucley family. This family, which possessed Affeton Castle in Devon for over 600 years, originally came from the village of Stukeley in Huntingdonshire, and were sheriffs of that county during the reign of King John. The family are descended from Richard Stucley, of Trent, Somerset, and Elizabeth Fitzroger his wife. Their son, Hugh Stucley married Katherine Affeton, heiress of the Affeton estates, and was sheriff of Devon in 1448. The fifth Baronet served as a Deputy Lieutenant and High Sheriff of Devon.

== Stucley baronets, of Affeton Castle (1859) ==
- Sir George Stucley Stucley, 1st Baronet (1812–1900)
- Lt.-Col. Sir William Lewis Stucley, 2nd Baronet (1836–1911)
- Sir Edward Arthur George Stucley, 3rd Baronet (1852–1927)
- Sir Hugh Nicholas Granville Stucley, 4th Baronet (1873–1956)
- Sir Dennis Frederic Bankes Stucley, 5th Baronet (1907–1983)
- Sir Hugh George Copplestone Bampfylde Stucley, 6th Baronet (born 1945)

The heir apparent to the baronetcy is George Dennis Bampfylde Stucley (born 1970), eldest son of the 6th Baronet.
