= Edmund Bastard =

Edmund Bastard may refer to:

- Edmund Bastard (politician) (1758–1816), British politician
- Edmund Pollexfen Bastard (1784–1838), British politician

== See also ==
- Bastard (disambiguation)
