= Townstal =

Village in Devon, England

Coordinates: 50.3523°N 3.5909°W

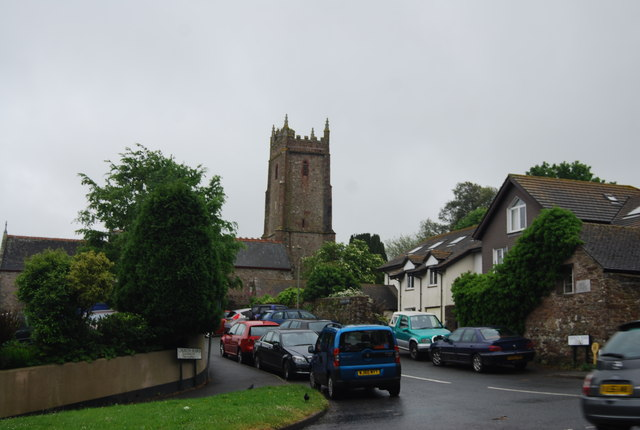
- St Clement's Church

- Location within Devon
- Civil parish: Dartmouth
- District: South Hams
- Shire county: Devon
- Region: South West
- Country: England
- Sovereign state: United Kingdom
- Police: Devon and Cornwall
- Fire: Devon and Somerset
- Ambulance: South Western

Townstal (anciently Tunstall, Townstall, etc.) is an historic manor and parish on elevated ground now forming part of the western suburbs of the town of Dartmouth, in the South Hams district, in the county of Devon, England.

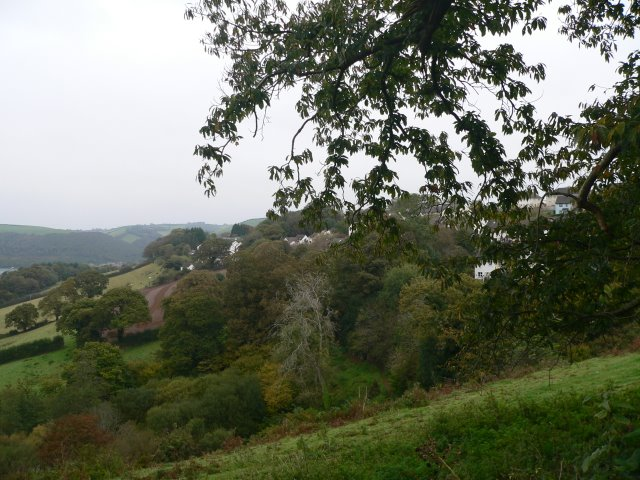
View to the north of Townstal

St Clement's Church, the parish church of Townstal, was formerly the mother church of Dartmouth. Within the parish was situated the estate of Mount Boone (now the site of Britannia Royal Naval College), in 1810 the residence of John Henry Seale (1780–1844), later 1st Baronet, Member of Parliament for Dartmouth in 1838, lord of the manors of Stoke Fleming and Cornworthy, where the Seale family had resided for many generations. Also within the parish was the estate of Mount Galpin, in 1810 the seat of Arthur Holdsworth (1780–1860), MP, Governor of Dartmouth Castle.

In 1881 the civil parish called Townstall had a population of 2425. On 26 March 1891 the parish was abolished and merged with Dartmouth.

== St Clement's Church ==
Townstal Church was granted to Torre Abbey in about 1198, shortly after the founding of that Abbey by the Premonstratensian order. In 1329 the vicar of Townstal allegedly drowned himself and the Bishop of Exeter punished this crime by issuing an interdict that forbade any religious services from taking place at the church for two years. The Bishop gave licence to William Bacon, one of the wealthiest burgesses of the town of Dartmouth, to hold private services at a chapel in his house, but nothing was done for the general public of the town. In 1330 King Edward III visited Dartmouth and was petitioned by the town's burgesses to allow them to build a church down by the waterside because of what they said was the "very great fatigue of their bodies" in climbing the hill to Townstal. Their petition was granted by a charter dated 16 February 1330 which allowed William Bacon to assign to Torre Abbey an acre of land in Clifton, near the river, to "build anew the parish church". However both the canons of Torre Abbey and the Bishop of Exeter opposed the building of a new church so nothing was done. In 1331 permission was granted "for aged and infirm parishioners" to celebrate mass at the chapel of St. Clare in a lower part of the town, but everyone else was clearly still expected to climb the hill to Townstal.

=== Dartmouth Friary ===
Dissatisfied with the situation, early in 1331 William Bacon negotiated to give the acre of land in Clifton to two Augustinian Hermits on which they should build an "oratory and dwelling houses". They apparently started building promptly because later in 1331 Bishop John Grandisson ordered action to be taken against two men "posing as priests" at Dartmouth, and he also excommunicated Bacon. In 1334 the bishop lifted Bacon's excommunication and the following year he allowed the friars to use their newly built chapel, but only for preaching, not for the celebration of mass or to hear confessions.

In 1340 a widow named Elena Cove won a case at the Exeter assizes in which she accused the friars, William Bacon, and several other Dartmouth burgesses of depriving her of a house and half an acre of land at Clifton. As a result of this case the land was restored to her, reducing the chapel's landholding by half. By 1344 Bishop Grandisson and the Arches court of Canterbury had ordered the friars to demolish their chapel on the grounds that it had been built on a site "belonging to the Abbot and Convent of Torre". The friars appealed to the Pope in Avignon against this decision, but the pope's court eventually decided against them too, holding that papal privilege meant that "no new churches or oratories could be built in territory held in advowson by the [Torre] Abbey".

=== Bishop of Damascus ===
According to entries in Bishop Grandisson's registers, in March 1344, before the decision made in Avignon reached Dartmouth, Bishop Hugo of Damascus OSA, a suffragan bishop in partibus arrived in the town. He consecrated the friary church and grounds, apparently claiming to act with the authority of the pope, then heard confessions, granted indulgences to several parishioners, absolved several who were excommunicate, and confirmed and anointed some children. He was then said to have gone into several taverns where he drank alcohol, showing people the ring which he wore, saying it had been given to him by the Pope himself. This attempt to save the friary was ultimately unsuccessful, and shortly after the result of the appeal reached Devon the Augustinian Friars were forced to leave.

=== Later history ===
The problems relating to the chapel were not resolved until 1372 when a charter dated 4th and 5 October stating that the Abbot and the Vicar of Townstal assented to its consecration at the expense of the parishioners who were also to bear the cost of services, with the proviso that if it was neglected in favour of the mother church at Townstal, then it would be closed. At first dedicated to the Holy Trinity, by Bishop Brantingham on 13 October 1372, a chantry chapel of St. Saviour is mentioned by 1496; this latter dedication eventually took over, and the church now standing on the site is known as St Saviour's, which is a Grade I listed building.

== Manor ==
During the reign of King Henry I (1100-1135) the manor of Townstal was inherited by William FitzStephen (son of William FitzStephen), seated at Norton within the parish, who donated 1/3 of a knight's fee and the Rectory of Townstal Church, to Torr Abbey, shortly after the founding of the latter, "for the health of his own soul and of Isabell his wife and of Willaim de Berchlay". The manor remained in the FitzStephen family for three more generations, when on the extinction of the male line it passed to the Dauney family, when it became known as Norton Dauney. The Dawney family also died out in the male line on the death of Sir John Dauney of Boconnoc in Cornwall, and his daughter and sole heiress Emeline (alias Emme) Dauney, married Edward Courtenay (d.1372) of Godlington, second son of Hugh de Courtenay, 2nd/10th Earl of Devon (1303–1377) of Tiverton Castle and father of Edward de Courtenay, 3rd/11th Earl of Devon (1357–1419), "The Blind". Thereafter Townstal descended with the other vast possessions of the Earls.

== Notable residents ==
- Nicholas Adams (died 1584), (alias Bodrugan), MP
- Gourney family, a Devonshire gentry family listed in the Heraldic Visitations of Devon, 1620.
- Roope family, a Devonshire gentry family listed in the Heraldic Visitations of Devon, 1620.

== Sources ==
- Freeman, Ray (1990). Dartmouth and its Neighbours. Phillimore. ISBN 0-85033-697-X.
- Jenkins, John Christopher (2010). Torre Abbey: Locality, Community, and Society in Medieval Devon (Thesis submitted for the Degree of Doctor of Philosophy). University of Oxford. pp. 162–167. (This is a pdf file but the downloaded file omits the file suffix)
