= Joseph Somes =

Conservative politician and shipowner

Member of Parliament for Dartmouth
- In office 27 December 1844 – 25 June 1845
- Preceded by: John Henry Seale
- Succeeded by: George Moffatt

Personal details
- Born: 9 December 1787 Stepney, London, England
- Died: 27 June 1845 (aged 57) London, England
- Resting place: St Dunstan's, Stepney, London, England
- Party: Conservative
- Parent(s): Maria Saxton (m. 1837) Mary Ann Daplyn (m. 1811; died 1835)

Joseph Somes (9 December 1787 – 25 June 1845) was a British shipowner and Conservative politician.

== Family ==
Born in Stepney, London, Somes was the youngest son of Samuel Somes (1758–1816) and Sarah née Green. In 1811, he married Mary Ann Daplyn, daughter of Thomas Daplyn of Stepney, and they had one surviving daughter. However, after her death in 1835, he remarried to Maria Saxton in 1837. Saxton was the daughter of Charles Saxton and sister of Charles Waring Saxton, an early migrant to New Zealand, and Somes' lawyer, Edward Saxton.

== Maritime career ==
Joseph Somes's house flag

Somes' early life saw him apprenticed to his father as a lighterman and then, at the age of 15, sent to sea, working in the coal and coastal trades. At age 21, he became a captain of one of his father's ships, then remaining at sea until 1816 and developing his knowledge of worldwide shipping and navigation.

Upon his father's death in 1818, the firm was extremely prosperous and he became a partner with his elder brother, Samuel, continuing to run the business in a financially successful way, even during difficult post-war years. By the time of his brother's death, Somes was operating as owner, sailmaker and chandler, as well as a charterer, especially for the East India Company.

In the 1830s, under Somes' sole ownership, the firm became one of the largest in Britain, and Somes took advantage of the breakup of the East India Company's fleet to purchase a number of its best ships, including the Lowther Castle and Earl of Balcarres. The firm's ships sailed mostly to the East Indies but also began to operate newly in Australasia, including whaling. They also travelled to Africa, The Americas, and the Baltic, but less often. By 1842, Somes' fleet spanned to at least 40 ships, and he was the largest private shipowner in the world—sometimes chartering ships to the government to transport convicts, stores, and troops.

As a consequence of his career, Somes developed an interest in the British colonies, investing in the Western Australia Company and the North American Colonisation Society of Ireland. Mostly, however, he invested in the New Zealand Company, which he joined when it refounded in 1838, and then sold to it its first ship, the Tory — which was sent to New Zealand in 1839 with a shipload of settlers, but without governmental permission. He then became a governor of the company in 1840, in which role he spearheaded an aggressive campaign to secure government recognition for the company, gaining financial concessions but no central role in the country's colonisation.

Somes was well known at the London Stock Exchange, an originator of the Lloyds Register of Shipping in 1834, and active within the General Shipowners' Society. He was frequently called to give evidence to government inquiries. In his later years, however, allies of his believed he would betray the company, which was close to collapse upon his death in 1845.

== Member of parliament ==
After unsuccessfully contesting Great Yarmouth at the 1841 general election, Somes was elected Member of Parliament for Dartmouth at a by-election in 1844—caused by the death of Sir John Henry Seale, 1st Baronet. Entering parliament required him to transfer ownership of his ships to his nephews, or he would have been disqualified as a government contractor. Somes held the seat for just six months until his death in 1845.

== Death ==
Somes died on 25 June 1845 at his home on Mile End Road, London, and was then buried in the family vault of St Dunstan's in Stepney on 2 July. He had an estimated wealth of £434,000.

Parliament of the United Kingdom
Preceded by John Henry Seale	Member of Parliament for Dartmouth; 1844–1845	Succeeded by George Moffatt
