= Edward Seale =

Edward Seale can refer to:

- Edward Seale (Australian cricketer) (1859–1927), Australian cricketer
- Edward Seale (English cricketer) (1811–1893), English cricketer
