= Bastard baronetcy =

Intended title for W Bastard (1727–1782)

The Bastard baronetcy, of Kitley in the County of Devon, was a title intended to be created in the Baronetage of Great Britain in September 1779 for William Bastard (1727–1782) in recognition of his actions in saving the arsenal of Plymouth from a French fleet in August of that year. The title was gazetted but Bastard declined to assume it and it did not ever pass the Great Seal.

== Family tree ==
Family tree

William Bastard 1727–1782	Anne Worsley
John Pollexfen Bastard; 1756–1816	Edmund Bastard; 1758–1816	Jane Pownoll
Edmund Pollexfen Bastard; 1784–1838	John Bastard RN; 1787–1835	Rev P P Bastard
