= Salver =

Flat serving tray

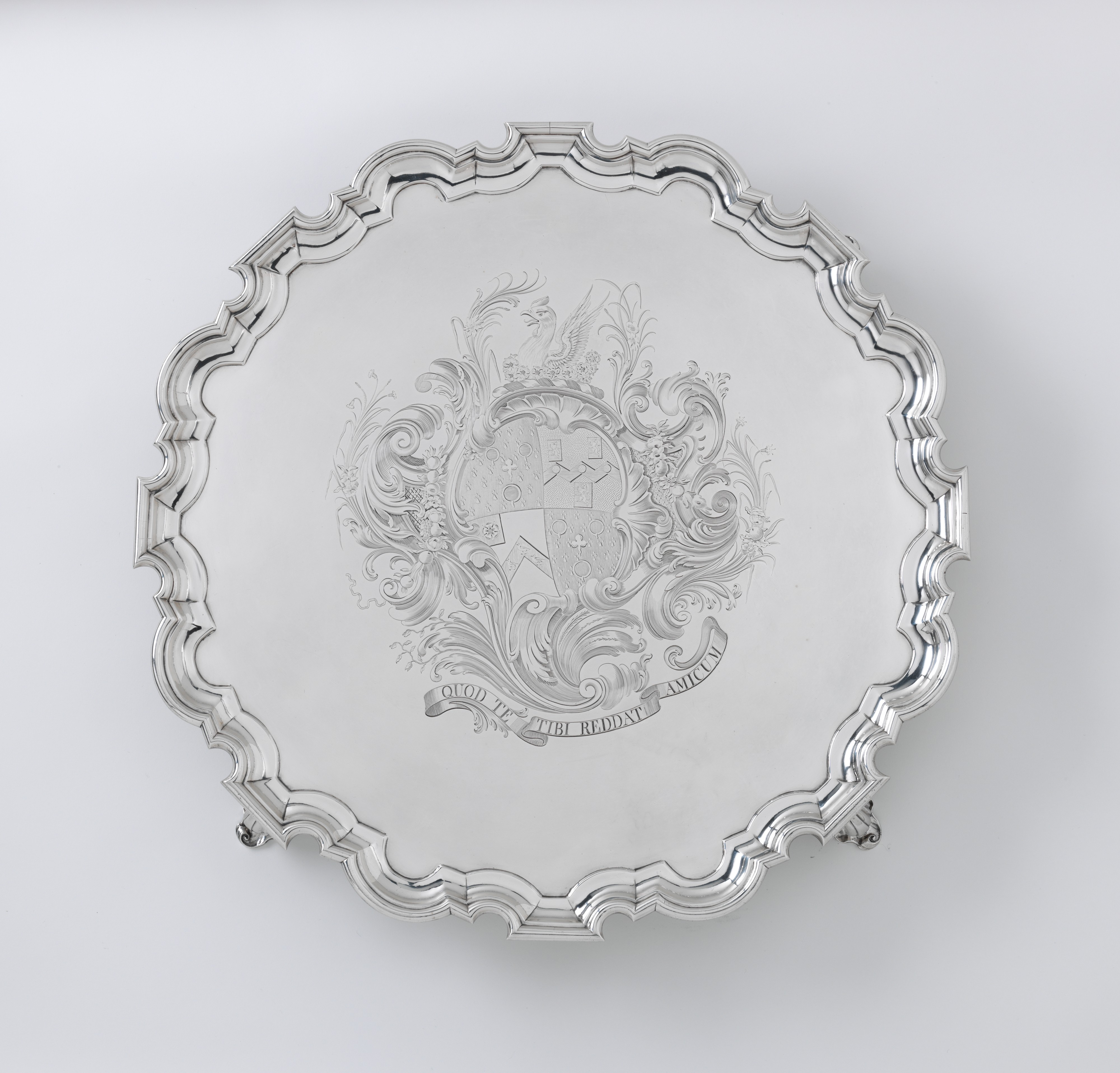
A silver salver dated 1738/39 featuring the arms of Jodrell

A salver is a flat, heavy tray of silver, other metal or glass used for carrying or serving glasses, cups, and dishes at a table, or for the presenting of a letter or card by a servant. In a royal or noble household the fear of poisoning led to the custom of tasting the food or beverage before it was served to the master and his guests; this was known as the assay of meat and drink, and in Spanish was called salva.

== Name ==
The verb salvar means to preserve from risk, from the Latin salvare, to save. The term salva was also applied to the dish or tray on which the food or drink was presented after the tasting process. There seems no doubt that this Spanish word is the source of the English salver; a parallel is found in the origin of the term credenza, which comes from Italian.

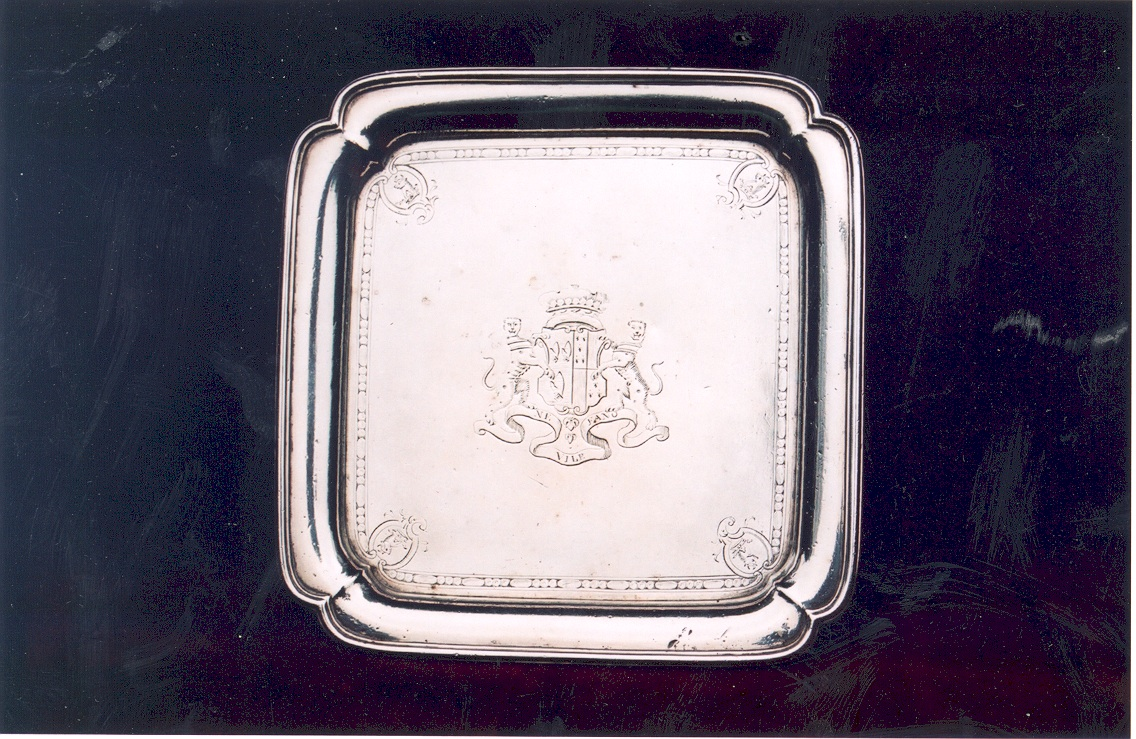
A waiter, a small square salver, London, 1732.

== Use as trophies ==
Ceremonial salvers have also been used as major sporting trophies, most notably a sterling silver salver as the Ladies' Singles trophy in the Wimbledon tennis championships since 1886, and since 1978, for the runner-up at the Masters golf tournament.

== Design ==
In the United States, salvers underwent a design change during the mid-18th century. Salvers with scroll-and-shell rims fell out of style during the 1760s and 1770s, replaced with gadrooned serpentine rims.
