= John Bastard (Royal Navy officer) =

British naval officer and politician (c. 1787–1835)

Captain John Bastard
- Born: c. 1787
- Died: 11 January January 11, 1835 (aged 47–48); Upper Grosvenor Street, London
- Relatives: Edmund Bastard (father); William Bastard (grandfather); Philemon Pownoll (grandfather); John Pollexfen Bastard (uncle); Edmund Pollexfen Bastard (brother)
- Military career
- Allegiance: United Kingdom of Great Britain and Ireland
- Branch: Royal Navy
- Service years: – 1835
- Rank: Post-Captain
- Commands: HMS Rattlesnake; HMS Albatross; HMS Bellona; HMS St Fiorenzo; HMS Bellona; HMS Africa; HMS Meander
- Conflicts: French Revolutionary Wars; Napoleonic Wars; War of 1812

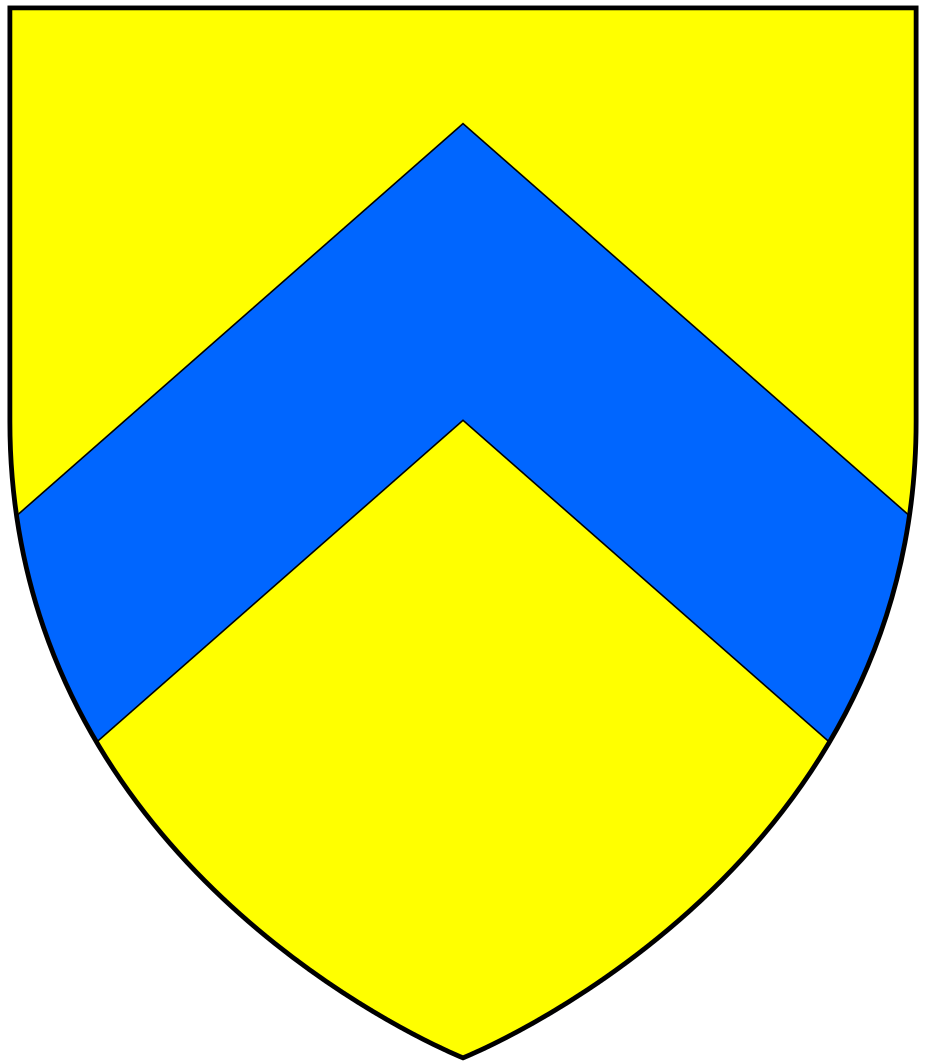
Arms of Bastard: Or, a chevron azure

John Bastard (c. 1787 – 11 January 1835) of Sharpham, Ashprington, Devon, was an officer of the Royal Navy who saw service during the French Revolutionary and Napoleonic Wars, and the War of 1812, rising to the rank of post-captain. He also entered politics and became a Member of Parliament.

Bastard was born into a family with considerable political connections, and was a grandson of the distinguished Royal Navy officer Captain Philemon Pownoll (d.1780), the builder of Sharpham House. He entered the navy and rose through the ranks during the wars with France. He was promoted to commander and given his first ship while in the East Indies, and was able to show his qualities by chasing a larger French privateer until she was captured by a larger British ship. Promoted to post-captain soon afterwards, one of his first post commands was the former privateer he had helped to capture. He was moved to the North American station shortly before the outbreak of the War of 1812 and commanded the station's flagship while serving in a detached squadron. Events that Bastard took part in included the capture of USS Nautilus and the chase of USS Constitution. His ship was sent home in 1814 and he commanded only one other ship before the drawdown of the navy after the end of the wars. He then entered politics, sitting for Dartmouth until 1832.

== Family ==
John Bastard was born c. 1787, the second son of Edmund Bastard, and his wife Jane Pownall. His father's side of the family included a large number of politicians, and a number of Tory Bastards sat in Parliament during the eighteenth and nineteenth centuries. Among them was his father, who represented Dartmouth, his uncle John Pollexfen Bastard, who represented Devonshire, and his brother Edmund Pollexfen Bastard, who represented Dartmouth and Devon. John would follow his family into politics, sitting for Dartmouth after his brother vacated his seat to sit for Devon. Through his mother John was the grandson of the distinguished naval officer Philemon Pownoll, whose estates at Sharpham, near at Ashprington, in Devon he eventually inherited.

== Early career ==
Bastard entered the navy and after a number of years of service, was promoted to lieutenant on 6 April 1804. His promotion came from the First Lord of the Admiralty, Lord St Vincent, in honour of his grandfather's contribution. He was advanced to master and commander on 22 May 1806, and was given command of the 16-gun sloop HMS Rattlesnake in the East Indies. Shortly after Bastard took command Rattlesnake came across the French privateer-frigate Bellone under Captain Jacques François Perroud off Ceylon, and despite the Frenchman's heavier armament, chased her north-west. By 3.15pm on 9 July they came in sight of the 74-gun HMS Powerful, under Captain Robert Plampin, some seven miles off the coast. Bellone had the advantage of the wind, whereas Plampin struggled to bring his ship close enough to intercept. Perroud attempted to bring his ship between Powerful and the shore before Plampin could cut her off, but Plampin was able to manoeuvre within range by 5pm and a running battle broke out, until the French finally struck at 6.45pm. Bastard's next command was the brig-sloop HMS Albatross in January 1807, though she was sold in Bombay in April that year.

== Post-captain ==
Bastard was promoted to post-captain on 12 October 1807 and was given command of the ship he had helped to capture. The Bellone had been brought into the Navy as the sixth rate HMS Bellona, with Bastard becoming her first British commander.^{[a]} He was later given command of HMS St Fiorenzo, after her captain, George Nicholas Hardinge, had been killed during the chase and capture of the 40-gun French frigate Piémontaise. He remained with St Fiorenzo until she was paid off in 1808.

== North America ==
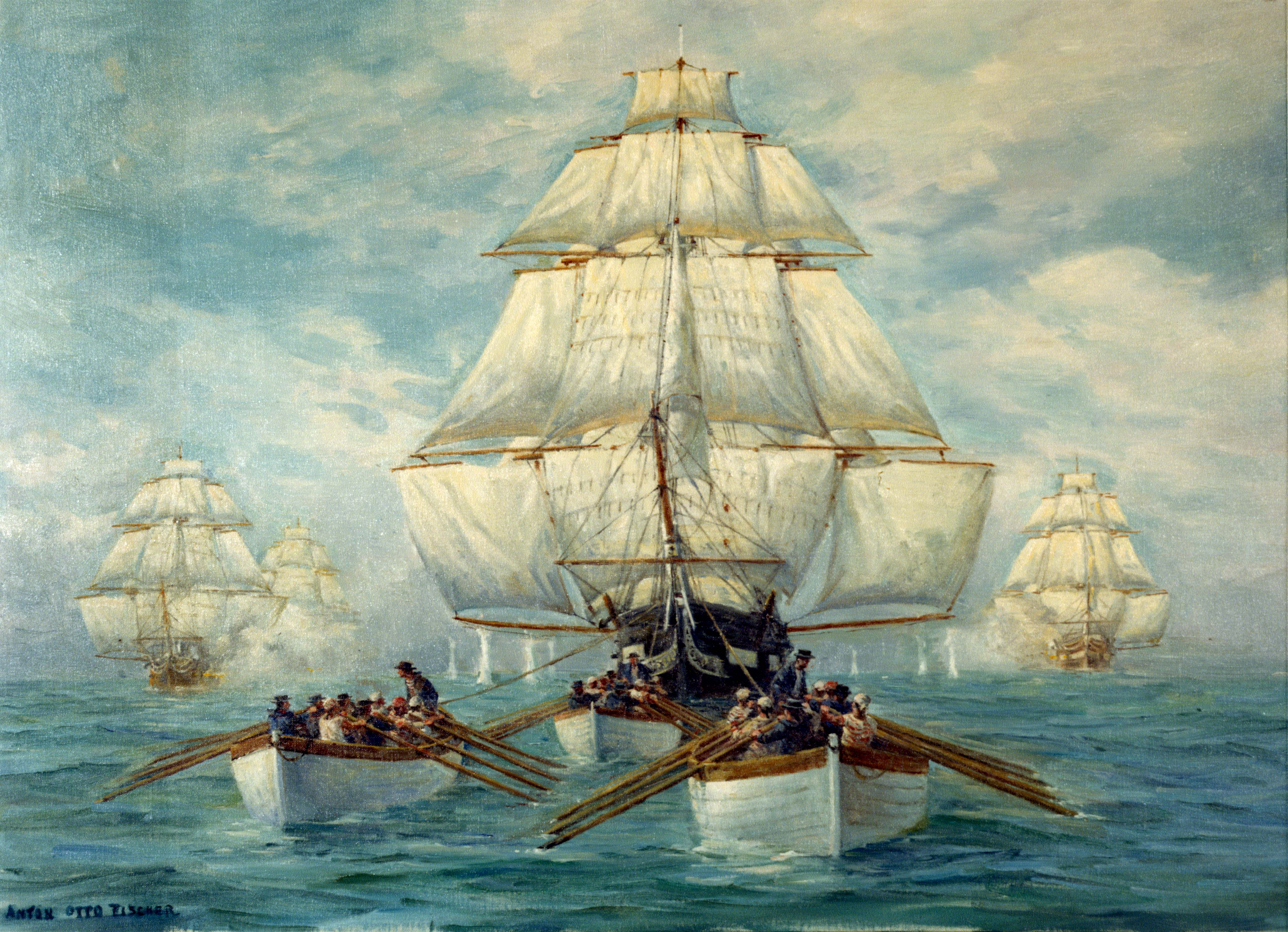
The British squadron, including Africa, pursue USS Constitution in July 1812

Bastard then served in North America, where he was temporarily in command of the 74-gun HMS Bellona on the Halifax station. He took command of the 64-gun HMS Africa in November 1811, the flagship of Vice-Admiral Herbert Sawyer. With the outbreak of the War of 1812 Africa was sent to join Captain Philip Broke's squadron in July 1812, and was present at the capture of the 14-gun USS Nautilus on 15 July. The British squadron, consisting of Africa, Broke's 38-gun HMS Shannon, the 38-gun HMS Guerriere under Captain James Richard Dacres, the 36-gun HMS Belvidera under Captain Richard Byron and the 32-gun HMS Aeolus under Captain Lord James Townshend, had arrived off New York City in search of USS President, then under Commodore John Rodgers, but she had already sailed. Instead they found the USS Nautilus, under William M. Crane, which failed to outrun the British squadron and surrendered, becoming the first warship either side lost during the war. Shortly afterwards the squadron fell in with USS Constitution and chased her for three days, with the American ship resorting to throwing her water and stores overboard, and having the ship towed and kedged, before she finally managed to escape.

Bastard remained in command of Africa until she was sent back to Britain and broken up in May 1814. He was given command of the 38-gun HMS Meander as a replacement ship and commanded her in British waters, fitting out at several dockyards.

== Politics and later life ==
Bastard entered politics in 1816. His family had considerable influence in a number of Cornish constituencies, and when his uncle, John Pollexfen Bastard, died, Edmund Pollexfen Bastard, John's brother, took his place as representative for Devon. This created a vacancy in Edmund's constituency of Dartmouth, and John was elected to fill it on 16 May 1816. He held the seat until its partial disenfranchisement in the 1832 Reform Act. He was also an alderman for Dartmouth. He married Frances Wade on 7 October 1817. John Bastard died at Upper Grosvenor Street, London on 11 January 1835, at the age of 48.

=== Disambiguation ===
John Pollexfen Bastard—John Bastard RN and Edmund Pollexfen Bastard—Edmund Bastard

William Bastard 1727-1782	Anne Worsley	Philemon Pownoll
John Pollexfen Bastard; 1756-1816	Edmund Bastard; 1758-1816	Jane Pownoll
Edmund Pollexfen Bastard; 1784-1838	John Bastard RN; 1787-1835	Rev. Philemon Pownoll Bastard

== Notes ==
a. There was already a ship of this name in the navy, an elderly 74-gun third rate. In consequence of this the new Bellona was renamed HMS Blanche in February 1808. Coincidentally Bastard would command the older Bellona in 1811, during his time on the North American station.

== Citations ==
Parliament of the United Kingdom
Preceded by Arthur Howe Holdsworth and Edmund Bastard	Member of Parliament for Dartmouth; 1816–1832; With: Arthur Howe Holdsworth (1816–1820); Charles Milner Ricketts (1820–1822); James Hamilton Stanhope (1822–1825); Sir John Hutton Cooper (1825–1828); Arthur Howe Holdsworth (1829–1832)	Succeeded by John Seale
