= Sir Thomas Dyke Acland, 9th Baronet =

Prominent landowner and member of West Country gentry

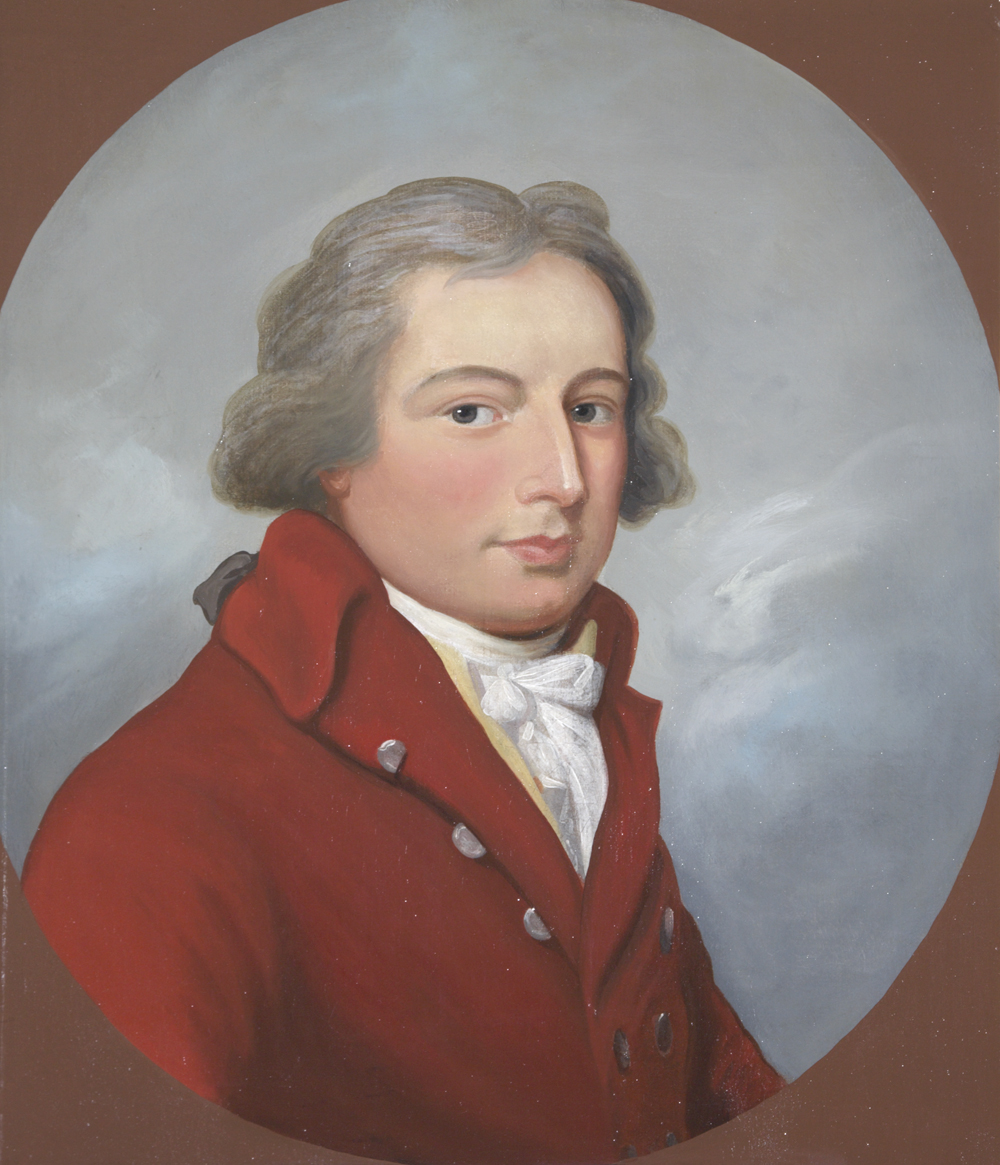
Sir Thomas Dyke Acland, 9th Baronet (1752–1794). By British (English) School, Collection of National Trust, Killerton House

Arms of Acland: Chequy argent and sable, a fesse gules

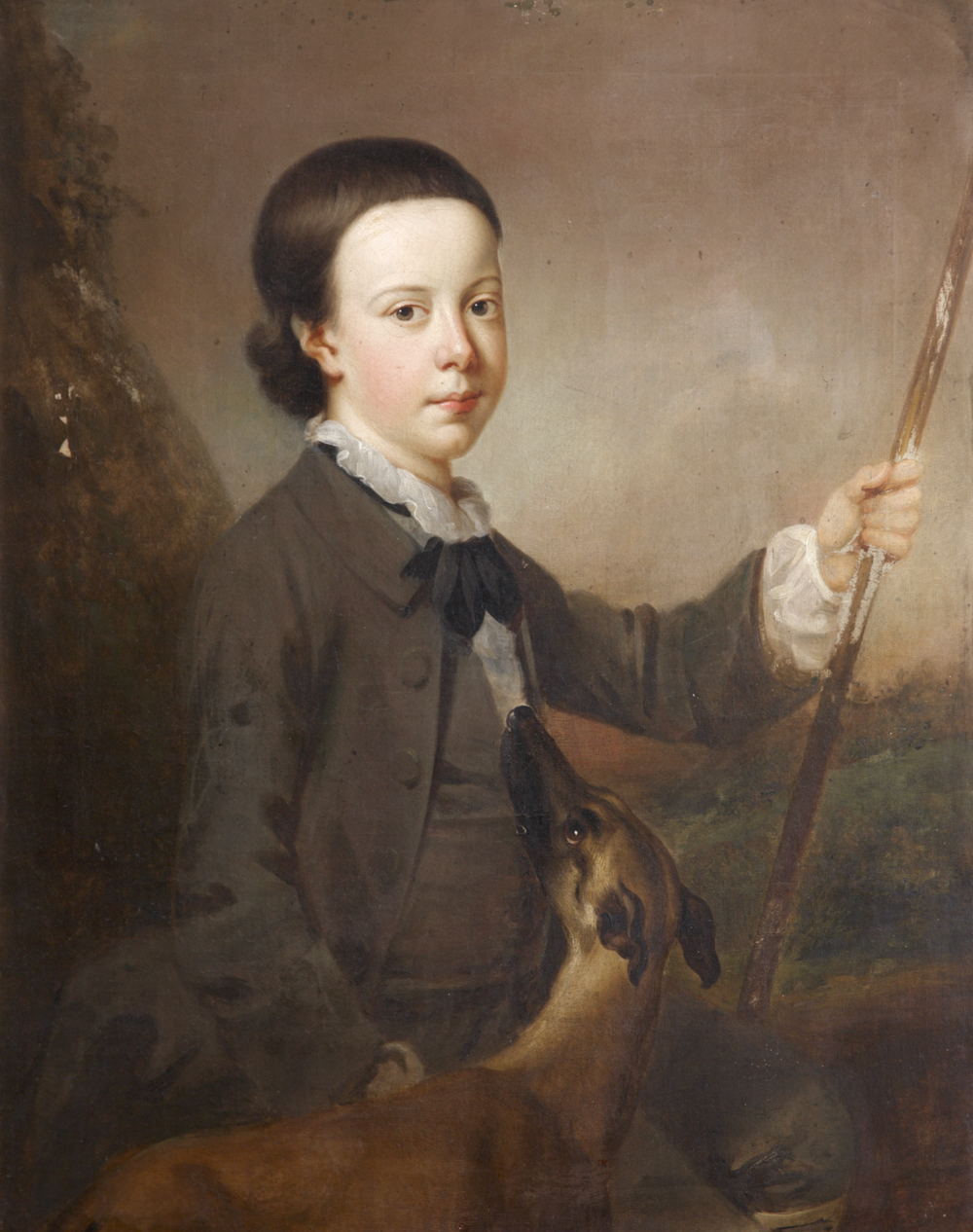
Acland as a boy, portrait by Richard Phelps

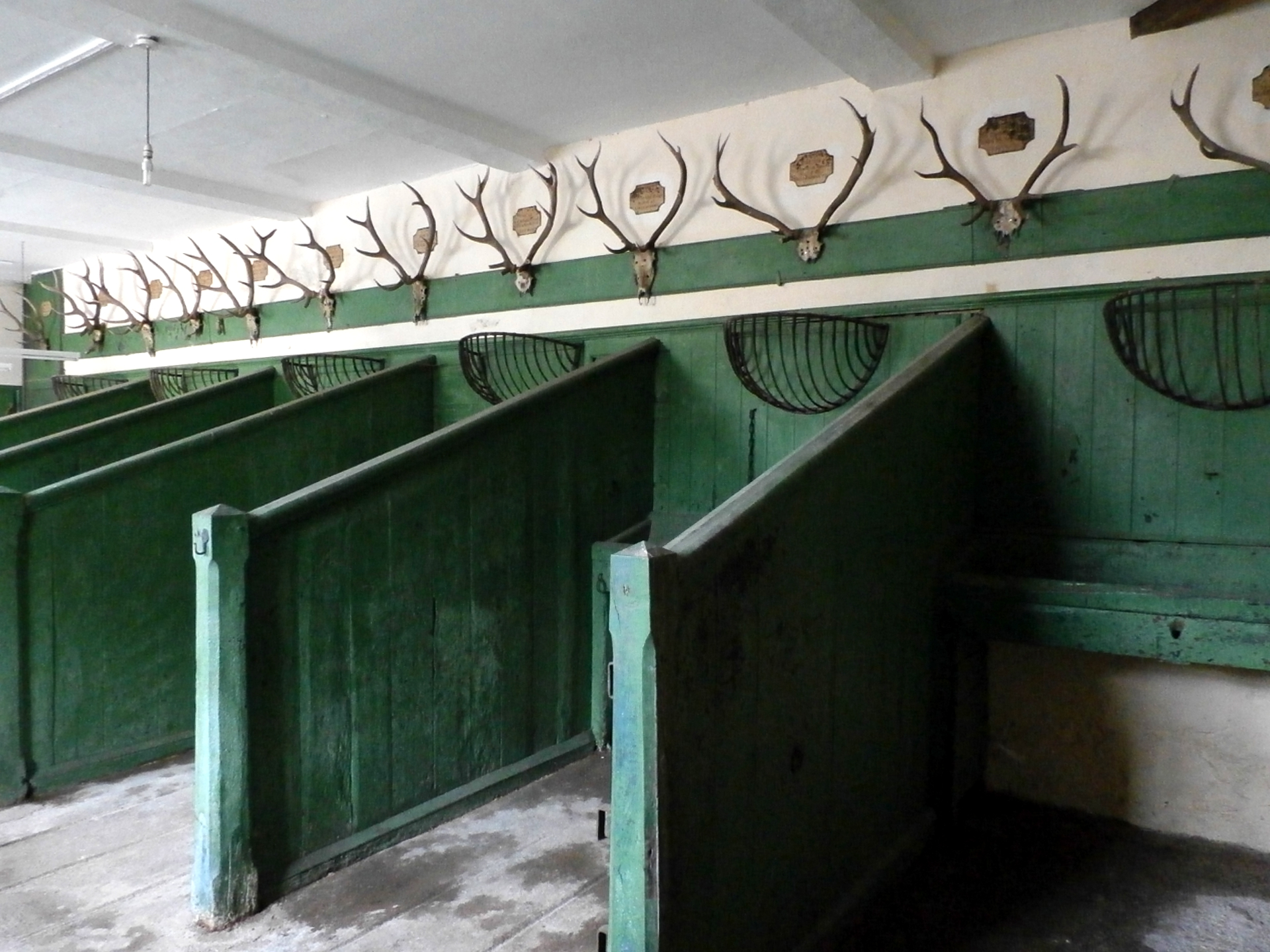
Stalls in stable block built by Acland at Holnicote. The thirty stag heads on the walls date from about 1787 to 1793 and were killed under his mastership of the Devon and Somerset Staghounds. A similar collection of stag heads amassed by his father the 7th Baronet, and much beloved by the latter, was destroyed during a fire at Holnicote in 1779

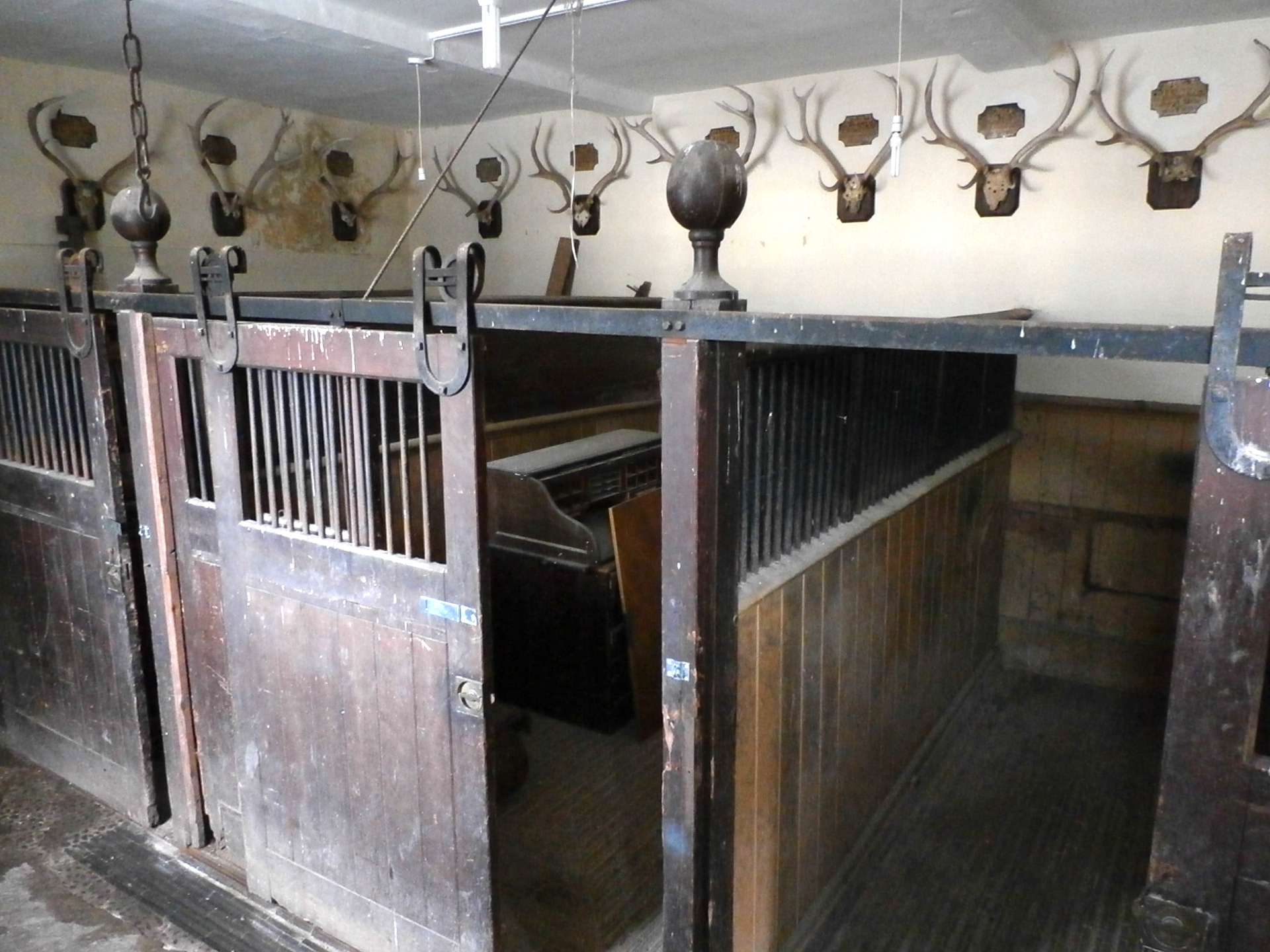
Loose boxes in stable block built by Acland at Holnicote, with his stag head trophies

Sir Thomas Dyke Acland, 9th Baronet (18 April 1752 – 17 May 1794) of Killerton in Devon and Holnicote in Somerset, was a prominent landowner and member of the West Country gentry. He was especially noted for his passion for staghunting, in which respect he took after his father. Like his father he was known locally in Devon and Somerset as "Sir Thomas his Honour".

== Origins ==
He was the second son of Sir Thomas Dyke Acland, 7th Baronet (1722–1785) of Killerton in Devon and Petherton Park in Somerset, by his wife Elizabeth Dyke (died 1753), daughter and heiress of Thomas Dyke of Tetton, Holnicote and Pixton in Somerset. The ancient Acland family, believed to be of Flemish origin, originated at the estate of Acland in the parish of Landkey in North Devon, where it is first recorded in 1155.

== Succession ==
He succeeded his seven-year-old nephew Sir John Dyke Acland, 8th Baronet (1778–1785) as 9th Baronet on the latter's death in April 1785. According to tradition he had become estranged from his father and had quarrelled with his elder brother Col. John Dyke Acland (1747–1778) and had consequently moved away from the family estates. It was during a chance visit to his old home that he learned of his succession to the baronetcy and the vast family estates.

== Education ==
He attended Eton College and University College, Oxford.

== Career ==
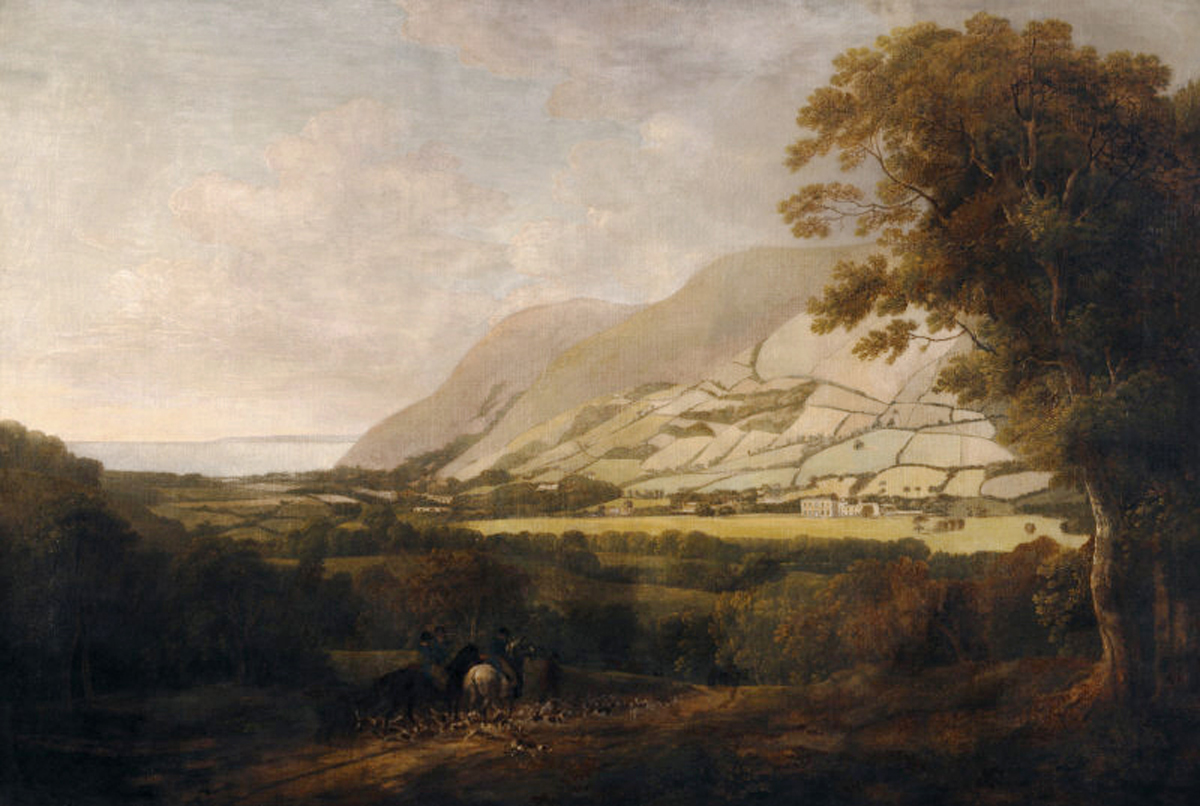
Holnicote House in 1785, as rebuilt after the fire of 1779, viewed from the south-west. In the foreground is Sir Thomas Dyke Acland with staghounds. 1785 Oil painting by Francis Towne.

He had a propensity to get into debt, and thus his father had avoided bequeathing him a large sum of capital he might squander. His elder brother had predeceased their father, and had left an infant son as heir to the baronetcy. His life was largely dedicated to staghunting and he followed his father into the Mastership of the North Devon Staghounds. He virtually abandoned the family's main seat of Killerton in mid-Devon, and lived chiefly at Holnicote and Highercombe, near Dulverton, situated at the north and south edges respectively of the ancient royal forest of Exmoor, renowned for its herds of Red Deer. His hospitality to his fellow staghunters was legendary, as had been that of his father. During the period 1785 to his death in 1794 he killed 101 stags, the heads and antlers of many of which are still displayed in the stables at Holnicote. He was a stern employer of his hunt-staff, and on one occasion when his hounds had killed several sheep, possibly belonging to his farming tenants, he ordered his huntsman "to hang himself and the whole pack".

On 4 August 1787, he was commissioned a captain in the North Devon Militia. He was promoted to major on 14 August 1790, and to lieutenant-colonel on 9 December 1793.

== Marriage and children ==
On 4 July 1785 at Barnes in Surrey, he married Henrietta Anne Hoare, a daughter of Sir Richard Hoare, 1st Baronet of Barn Elms, a partner in the City of London banking firm C. Hoare & Co, and Frances Anne Acland. She survived him and in 1795 remarried to Captain the Hon. Matthew Fortescue (1754–1842), Royal Navy, younger brother of Hugh Fortescue, 1st Earl Fortescue of Castle Hill, Filleigh, Devon. By his wife he had children including Sir Thomas Dyke Acland, 10th Baronet (1787–1871), eldest son and heir, and Hugh Dyke Acland (1791–1834).

== Death and succession ==
He died on 17 May 1794, having fallen ill during a journey to London. He was buried in the family vault in Broadclyst Church, the parish church of Killerton House. His Latin epitaph was written in the burial register of Selworthy Church, the parish church of Holnicote, as follows:

Hic finis fatorum Priami hic exitus illum
Sorte tulit! – Vale. Vale. Vale.
Nec Meridies nec Aurora unquam vident ejus ora.
Reliquit nobis cornu, canes, tandem quiescant ejus manes.
("This was the fated end of Priam's empire and of his own life! Farewell. Farewell. Farewell. Neither Noon nor Dawn shall ever see his face again. He left us his horn and his hounds; may his spirit finally rest in peace".)

He was succeeded in the baronetcy by his eldest son Sir Thomas Dyke Acland, 10th Baronet (1787–1871), whose interests lay not in hunting but rather in politics and philanthropy, which set the trend for several generations of his descendants.

Baronetage of England
Preceded by John Dyke Acland	Baronet (of Columb John); 1785–1794	Succeeded by Thomas Dyke Acland
