= John Pollexfen Bastard =

British Tory politician

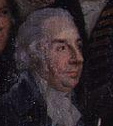

Member of the Great Britain Parliament for Truro
- In office 1783–1784 Serving with Bamber Gascoyne
- Preceded by: Henry Rosewarne; Bamber Gascoyne
- Succeeded by: Sir John St Aubyn; Bamber Gascoyne

Member of the Great Britain Parliament for Member of Parliament for Devonshire
- In office 1784–1800 Serving with: John Rolle, to 1796; Sir Lawrence Palk, from 1796
- Preceded by: John Rolle; John Parker
- Succeeded by: Self in Parliament of the United Kingdom

Member of Parliament for Devonshire
- In office 1801–1816 Serving with: Sir Lawrence Palk, to 1812; Sir Thomas Dyke Acland, from 1812
- Preceded by: Self in Parliament of Great Britain
- Succeeded by: Sir Thomas Dyke Acland; Edmund Pollexfen Bastard

Personal details
- Born: 18 September 1756
- Died: 4 April 1816 (aged 59)
- Party: Tory
- Relatives: Edmund Bastard (brother); Edmund Pollexfen Bastard (nephew); John Bastard (nephew)

John Pollexfen Bastard (18 September 1756 – 4 April 1816) was a British Tory politician, landowner and colonel of the East Devon Militia who was born and lived at Kitley House, Yealmpton, Devon.

He married Sarah Wymondesold of East Lockinge, Berkshire, on 25 March 1780 at St Mary, Lambeth. She died in April 1808 leaving no surviving children. On 2 July 1809 he married, at Portland Chapel, Marylebone, Judith Anne Martin, daughter of Sir Henry Martin, naval commissioner at Portsmouth and Comptroller of the Navy. He left no children of either marriage.

== Defence of Plymouth ==
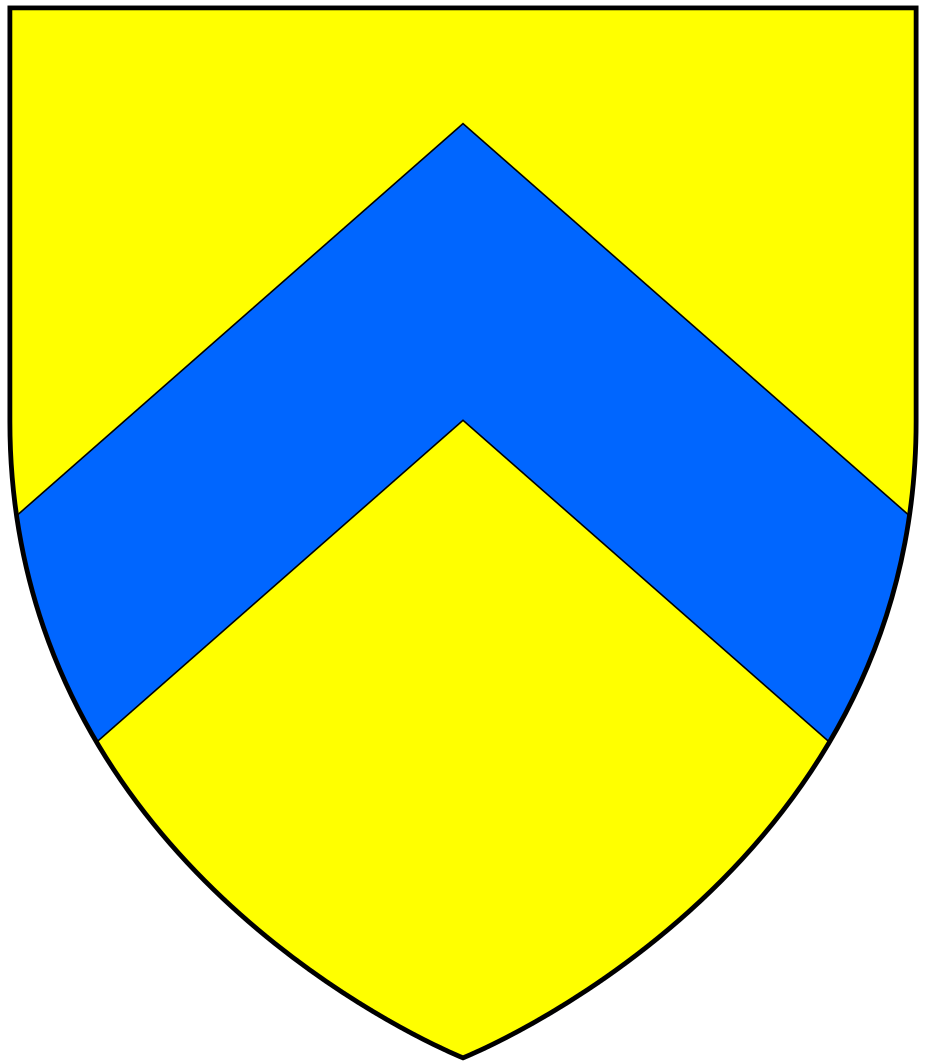
Arms of Bastard: Or, a chevron azure

When colonel of the East Devon Militia his father, William Bastard (b. 1 September 1727), saved the arsenal of Plymouth from the French Fleet in August 1779 and, to recognise that, was gazetted a baronet on 4 September but he declined to assume the title. Through his mother, born Bridget Poulett, William was a member of the Poulett, Bertie, Herbert and other influential families.

In 1801 when colonel of the same regiment John Pollexfen Bastard quelled a riot of workmen and prevented the destruction of the Plymouth docks and dockyards. In 1815 he was conveyed by the Royal Navy to Leghorn (Livorno) for his health where he died the next year and was initially buried in the Old English Cemetery in Livorno, where his monument still stands. His body was returned to Devon in a man-of-war.

== Parliament ==
He was elected Member of Parliament for Truro in 1783 and for the Devonshire Constituency from 1784. He stood down in 1812 and was succeeded by his nephew Edmund Pollexfen Bastard (1784-1838) (the eldest son of his younger brother Edmund Bastard (1758–1816)), who held the seat until 1830.

According to the Oxford Companion to Children's Literature, Bastard indirectly inspired the familiar form of the children's rhyme "Old Mother Hubbard..." after instructing its author Sarah Catherine Martin, his sister-in-law, to "run away and write one of your stupid little rhymes."

Bastard owned several houses and large tracts of land in western England including his main residence Kitley House.

The National Portrait Gallery has a portrait of John Pollexfen Bastard standing beside his younger brother Edmund in a mezzotint of a painting by James Northcote.

He also can be spotted in Karl Anton Hickel's William Pitt addressing the House of Commons on the French Declaration of War, 1793 in the collection of the National Portrait Gallery.

A detailed account of his last journey and subsequent death can be found in the letters of Miss Eliza Simcoe, daughter of John Graves Simcoe, who travelled with John Pollexfen Bastard and his wife to Leghorn as part of her Grand Tour. She accompanied his wife on the rest of the journey and nursed her through several episodes of bad health. The letters are held at Devon Record Office as part of the Simcoe Family papers (REF:1038M).

=== Disambiguation ===
John Pollexfen Bastard—John Bastard RN and Edmund Pollexfen Bastard—Edmund Bastard

Pollexfen; Bastard	Bridget; Poulett
William Bastard; 1727–1782	Anne Worsley
John Pollexfen Bastard; 1756–1816	Edmund Bastard; 1758–1816	Jane Pownoll
Edmund Pollexfen Bastard; 1784–1838	John Bastard RN; 1787–1835	Rev Philemon Pownoll Bastard; 1792–1846

Parliament of Great Britain
Preceded by Henry Rosewarne and Bamber Gascoyne	Member of Parliament for Truro; 1783–1784 (with Bamber Gascoyne)	Succeeded by Sir John St Aubyn and Bamber Gascoyne
Parliament of Great Britain
Preceded by John Rolle and John Parker	Member of Parliament for Devonshire; 1784–1800 (with John Rolle, to 1796; Sir Lawrence Palk, from 1796)	Succeeded by (self in Parliament of the United Kingdom)
Parliament of the United Kingdom
Preceded by (self in Parliament of Great Britain)	Member of Parliament for Devonshire; 1801–1816 (with Sir Lawrence Palk, to 1812; Sir Thomas Dyke Acland, from 1812)	Succeeded by Sir Thomas Dyke Acland and Edmund Pollexfen Bastard
