= William Brockedon =

English painter

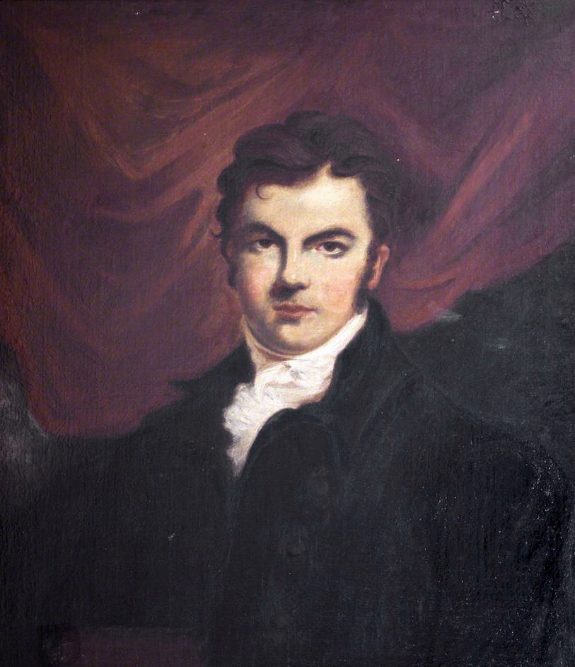
Self portrait

William Brockedon (13 October 1787 – 29 August 1854) was a 19th-century English painter, writer and inventor.

== Early life ==
Brockedon was born at Totnes on 13 October 1787, son of a watchmaker. He was educated at a private school in Totnes, but learned more from his father, taking over the business during the illness of nearly twelve months which ended in his father's death in September 1802. Brockedon then spent six months in London in the house of a watch manufacturer.

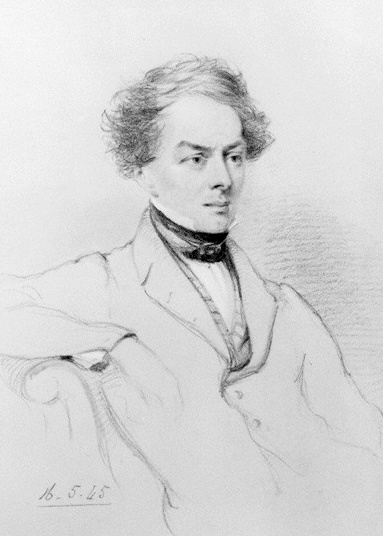
Sir Charles Fellows by William Brockedon.

On his return to Totnes he continued to carry on the business for his mother for five years. Robert Hurrell Froude, then rector of Dartington, encouraged him to pursue painting as a profession, and supported him during studies at the Royal Academy. Brockedon found another generous patron in Arthur Howe Holdsworth, governor of Dartmouth Castle.

== Painter ==
Illustration from Little Saint Bernard, the mont Genevre, the mont Cenis, the mont Saint Gothard, the Great Saint Bernard, and the monte Stelvio, 1828

From 1809 he pursued his studies in London as a painter with little interruption till 1815. Immediately after the battle of Waterloo he went to Belgium and France, and saw the gallery of the Louvre before its dispersion. From 1812 to 1837 he was a regular contributor to the exhibitions of the Royal Academy and the British Institution. In these twenty-five years he exhibited 65 works, historical, landscape, and portraits: 36 at the Academy and 29 at the British Institution. The works he exhibited in 1812 were portraits of Governor Holdsworth, M.P., and of Samuel Prout, who was, like himself, a Devonshire artist. He next exhibited a portrait of 'Miss S. Booth as Juliet', pictures on scriptural and other subjects, portraits of Sir Alexander Burns and Sir George Back, and landscapes of Alpine and Italian scenery. Another large picture, representing the 'Delivery of the Tables of the Law to Moses on Mount Sinai,' was presented by him to Christ's Hospital in 1835. A picture, painted at Rome in 1821, the 'Vision of the Chariots to the Prophet Zechariah,' was by permission of Pope Pius VII exhibited in the Pantheon.

Brockedon was elected a member of the Academies of Rome and Florence. In compliance with a law of the Florentine Academy he presented it with his portrait painted by his own hand. Brockedon's portrait was hung in the Uffizi of the Florence Gallery near those of Reynolds and Northcote.

== Writer ==
Brockedon was meanwhile earning for himself a reputation as an author. In 1824 he made an excursion to the Alps for the purpose of investigating the route of Hannibal, and the idea of publishing Illustrations of the Passes occurred to him. During the summers of 1825, 1826, 1828, and 1829, he was led in the course of his journeys to cross the Alps fifty-eight times, and to pass into and out of Italy by more than forty different routes. The result was the publication, in 1827, of the first part of his Illustrations of the Passes of the Alps by which Italy communicates with France, Switzerland, and Germany. The work, containing 109 engravings, was issued in twelve parts, from 1827 to 1829, forming when complete two royal quarto volumes, and was dedicated to his earliest patron, Archdeacon Froude. The drawings, which were entirely by Brockedon's own hand, were done in sepia, and were sold in 1837 to George Venables-Vernon, 5th Baron Vernon for 500 guineas.

In 1833 he published in one volume his Journals of Excursions in the Alps, the Pennine, Graian, Cottian, Rhetian, Lepontine, and Bernese. He also edited William Finden's Illustrations to the Life and Works of Lord Byron. In 1835 he edited for the Findens the Illustrated Road Book from London to Naples, with thirty illustrations by himself and his friends Prout and Stanfield. In 1836 he wrote for Blackwood's Magazine Extracts from the Journal of an Alpine Traveller, and he subsequently wrote the Savoy and Alpine parts of Murray's Handbook for Switzerland. His next work, published in folio in 1842-4, was Italy, Classical, Historical, and Picturesque, illustrated and described, with sixty engravings from drawings by himself, Eastlake, Prout, Roberts, Stanfield, Harding, and other friends. In 1855, in conjunction with George Croly, he wrote part of the text of David Roberts's The Holy Land, Syria, Idumea, Arabia, Egypt, and Nubia, Croly writing the historical, and Brockedon the descriptive portions.

=== Works ===
- Brockedon, William (1828). Illustrations of the passes of the Alps, by which Italy communicates with France, Switzerland, and Germany. Vol. 1. London: printed for the author.
- Brockedon, William (1829). Illustrations of the passes of the Alps, by which Italy communicates with France, Switzerland, and Germany. Vol. 2. London: printed for the author.

=== In Literature ===
Letitia Elizabeth Landon published a poem on the subject of Brockedon's painting of Raphael Showing his Mistress her Portrait in The Literary Gazette in 1824.

== Inventor ==
In 1819 he turned attention to the mode of wire-drawing then in use. Brockedon invented a mode of drawing the wire through holes pierced in sapphires, rubies, and other gems. He patented this invention, and visited Paris in connection with it; but it was not a source of profit. In 1831 he invented and patented, in conjunction with Mr. Mordan, a pen of a form called the 'oblique,' from the slit being in the usual direction of the writing. He next turned his attention to the preparation of a substitute for corks and bungs by coating felt with vulcanised india-rubber. He took out a patent for this invention in 1838, and in 1840 and 1842 enlarged its scope by other patents for retaining fluids in bottles, and for the manufacture of fibrous materials for the cores of stoppers. This invention led to his forming business relations with Messrs. Charles Macintosh & Co. of Manchester. About the year 1841 he submitted to them his patents for a substitute for corks, through which he was interested in their business till 1845, when he became a partner, and retained that position till his death.

In 1843 he patented an invention for the manufacture of wadding for firearms; another for compressing sodium carbonate and potassium carbonate into the form of pills and lozenges; and for preparing or treating plumbago by reducing common black lead to powder, and then compressing it in vacuo, so as to produce artificial plumbago for lead pencils purer than any that could then be obtained, in consequence of the exhaustion of the mines in Cumberland, and especially valuable to artists because it was free from (diamond) grit. The invention was first worked for him by Messrs. Mordan & Co., but at his death in 1854 the plant and machinery were sold by auction, and bought by one of the merchants connected with the lead industry at Keswick. In 1844, 1846, and 1851, he patented inventions for various applications of vulcanised india-rubber.

== Later life ==
In 1830 Brockedon took an active part in the formation of the Royal Geographical Society, and was elected a member of its first council. He was afterwards the founder of the Graphic, an art society. On 12 June 1830 he was elected a member of the Athenæum. On 18 December 1834 he was elected a fellow of the Royal Society.

He died on 29 August 1854, in his sixty-sixth year, at 29 Devonshire Street, Queen Square, Bloomsbury, and was buried in the grave which contained the remains of his first wife and his son in the burial-ground of St. George the Martyr, in Hunter Street, Brunswick Square.

== Family ==
He married in 1821 Elizabeth Graham, who died in childbirth on 23 July 1829, in her fortieth year, leaving two children, Philip North, born at Florence on 27 April 1822, and Mary, married to Joseph Hornby Baxendale, the head of the firm of Pickford & Co. The son, who was educated as a civil engineer, became the favourite pupil of Isambard Kingdom Brunel, but died of consumption at the age of 28, on 13 November 1849. On 8 May 1839 Brockedon married, as his second wife, the widow of Captain Farwell of Totnes, who survived him, and by whom he had no issue.
