= Sir Thomas Dyke Acland, 10th Baronet =

British politician and baronet (1787-1871)

Sir Thomas Dyke Acland, Bt
- Baronet of Columb John
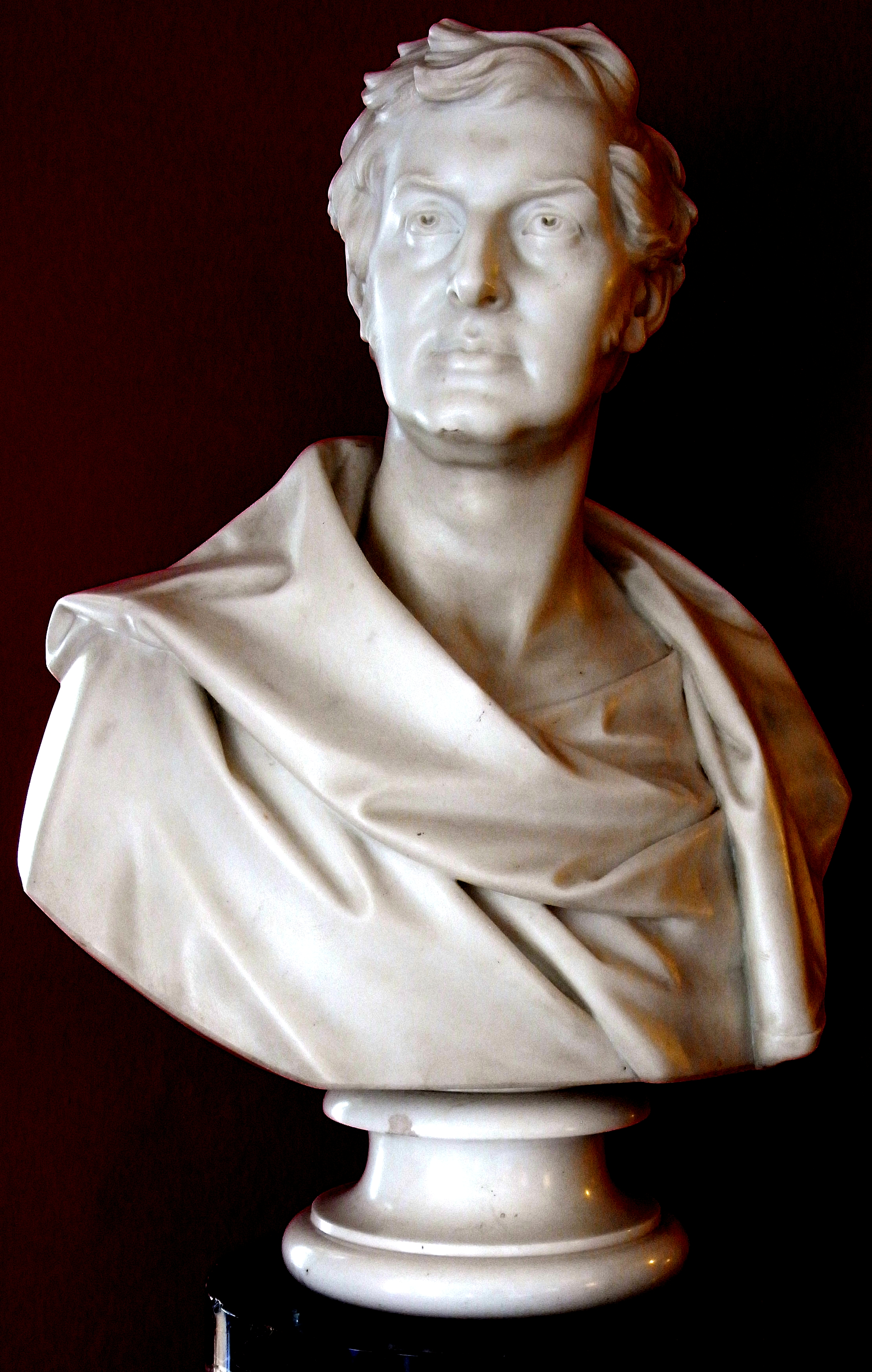
- Sir Thomas Dyke Acland, 10th Baronet (1787–1871). 1844 marble bust by Edward Bowring Stephens. Collection of National Trust, Killerton House
- Tenure: 17 May 1794 – 22 July 1871
- Predecessor: Thomas, 9th Baronet
- Successor: Thomas, 11th Baronet
- Born: 29 March 1787
- Died: 22 July 1871 (aged 84)
- Issue: Lydia Dorothea Acland; Agnes Lucy Acland; Sir Thomas Dyke Acland, 11th Baronet; Arthur Henry Dyke Acland; Lt. Charles Baldwin Dyke Acland; Henry Acland; Reverend Peter Leopold Dyke Acland; John Acland (runholder); Dudley Reginald Dyke Acland
- Father: Sir Thomas Dyke Acland, 9th Baronet
- Mother: Henrietta Anne Hoare

A drawing of Acland

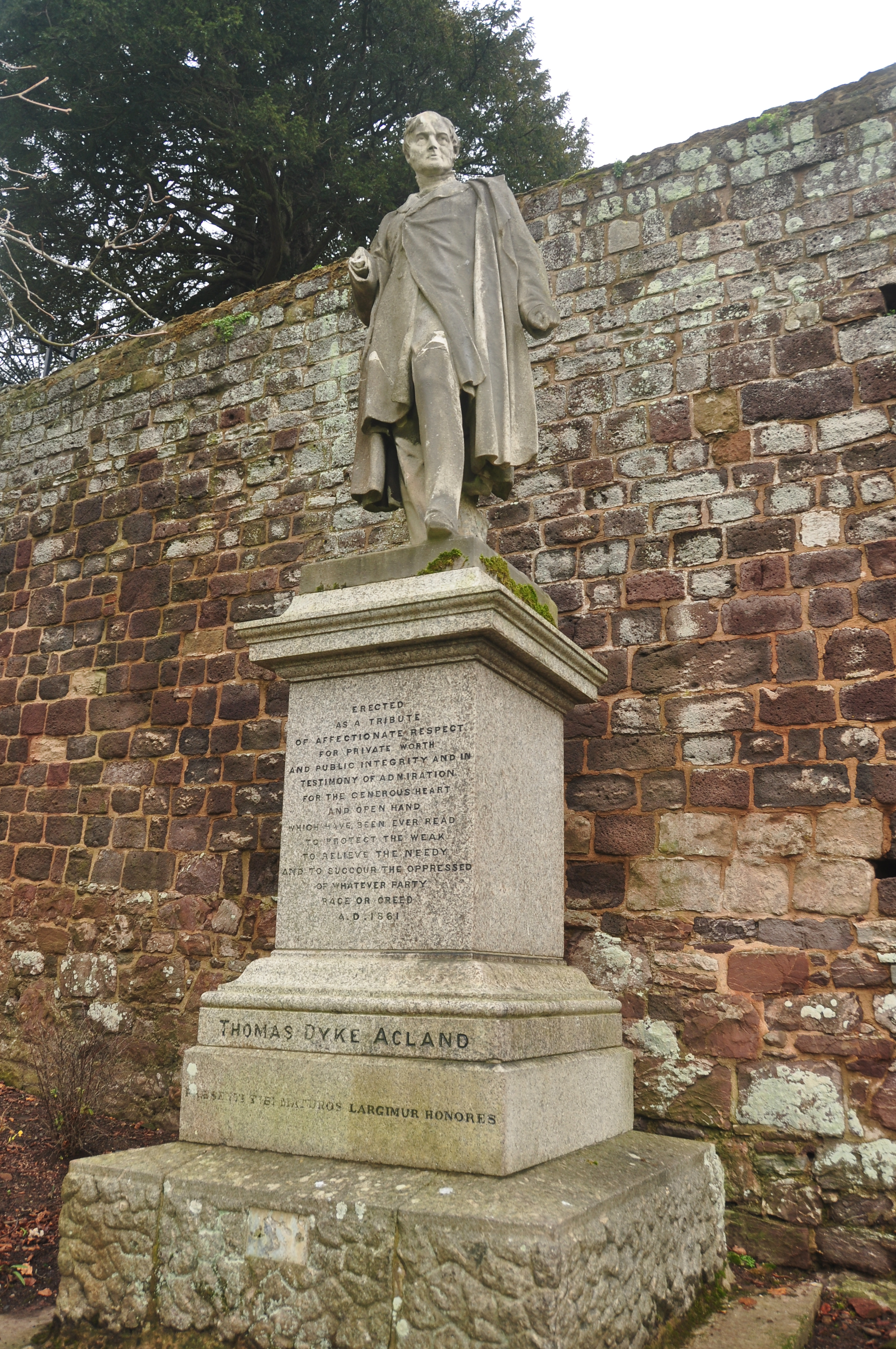
Statue in Northernhay Gardens, Exeter

Sir Thomas Dyke Acland, 10th Baronet (29 March 1787 – 22 July 1871) was a British politician and baronet.

== Background ==
Born in London, he was the eldest son of Sir Thomas Dyke Acland, 9th Baronet and his wife, Henrietta Anne Hoare, daughter of Sir Richard Hoare, 1st Baronet. The Aclands were an old Devon family and successive generations of the family sat in the House of Commons for the county. His family had extensive properties on what is now the Holnicote Estate and particularly the village of Selworthy. In 1794, he succeeded his father as baronet. Acland was educated at Harrow School (between 1799-1804) and Christ Church, Oxford and graduated with a Bachelor of Arts in 1808, and a Master of Arts in 1814. He gained a Doctor of Civil Laws degree in 1831.

== Career ==
He was appointed High Sheriff of Devon for 1809–10. Although the Aclands were usually associated with the Liberal Party, this Acland was a Tory. He was the Member of Parliament (MP) for Devonshire from 1812 to 1818 and again from 1820 to 1831. He then sat for North Devon from 1837 to 1857.

Among his many business interests Acland was the owner of a schooner called Lady of St Kilda, which he bought in 1834. It was named for the remote Scottish archipelago he visited with his wife in 1812 when he made the earliest extant sketches of the old clachan.

On the maiden voyage of his new yacht in 1834 he again visited the islands, leaving twenty gold sovereigns with the minister to assist in the building of new houses, which was later matched by their improving Landlord, Lt Col MacLeod of Skye. In 1842 the schooner visited the township of Melbourne in Australia, which had been founded in 1835.

As a result of that visit, the suburb of St Kilda was named after the ship, and Acland Street, one of St Kilda's main commercial centres, was named after Acland.

== Philanthropy ==
As a public benefactor, he commissioned Compass Point storm tower, which was built near Bude in 1835.

== Family ==
In 1808, he married Lydia Elizabeth Hoare, daughter of the banker Henry Hoare of Mitcham Grove, and had issue.

- Lydia Dorothea Acland (d. 14 Mar 1858)
- Agnes Lucy Acland (1822-23 May 1895)
- Sir Thomas Dyke Acland, 7th/11th Bt. (25 May 1809 – 29 May 1898)
- Arthur Henry Dyke Acland (3 May 1811 – 19 Jun 1857) In 1852 he changed his name to Troyte as a condition of inheriting the Huntsham estate.
- Lt. Charles Baldwin Dyke Acland (1812–1837)
- Sir Henry Wentworth Acland, 1st Bt. (23 Aug 1815 – 16 Oct 1900) (New baronetcy created)
- Reverend Peter Leopold Dyke Acland (3 Jun 1819 – 24 Oct 1899)
- John Barton Arundell Acland (25 Nov 1823 – 18 May 1904)
- Dudley Reginald Dyke Acland (1828–1837)

Parliament of the United Kingdom
Preceded by Sir Lawrence Palk; John Pollexfen Bastard	Member of Parliament for Devon; 1812 – 1818; With: John Pollexfen Bastard 1812–1816; Edmund Pollexfen Bastard 1816–1818	Succeeded by Edmund Pollexfen Bastard; Hugh Fortescue
Preceded by Hugh Fortescue; Edmund Pollexfen Bastard	Member of Parliament for Devon; 1820 – 1831; With: Edmund Pollexfen Bastard 1820–1830; Lord John Russell 1830–1831	Succeeded by Hugh Fortescue; Lord John Russell
Preceded by Newton Fellowes; Hugh Fortescue	Member of Parliament for North Devon; 1837 – 1857; With: Hugh Fortescue 1837–1839; Lewis Buck 1839–1857	Succeeded by James Wentworth Buller; Charles Henry Rolle Trefusis
Baronetage of England
Preceded by Thomas Dyke Acland	Baronet (of Columb John); 1794–1871	Succeeded by Thomas Dyke Acland
