= Hugh Fortescue, 2nd Earl Fortescue =

British politician (1783–1861)

The Right Honourable The Earl Fortescue KG PC
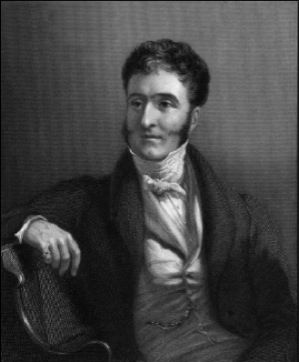
- Fortescue, engraving by W. Holl from a painting by George Hayter

Lord Lieutenant of Ireland
- In office 13 March 1839 – 11 September 1841
- Monarch: Victoria
- Prime Minister: The Viscount Melbourne
- Preceded by: The Marquess of Normanby
- Succeeded by: The Earl de Grey

Personal details
- Born: 13 February 1783
- Died: 14 September 1861 (aged 78)
- Party: Whig
- Spouse(s): (1) Lady Susan Ryder (1796–1827) (2) Elizabeth Geale (c. 1805–1896)
- Children: Hugh Fortescue, 3rd Earl Fortescue; John Fortescue; Dudley Fortescue
- Parent(s): Hugh Fortescue, 1st Earl Fortescue; Hester Grenville
- Education: Brasenose College, Oxford

Hugh Fortescue, 2nd Earl Fortescue (13 February 1783 – 14 September 1861), styled Viscount Ebrington from 1789 to 1841, was a British Whig politician. He was Lord Lieutenant of Ireland from 1839 to 1841.

== Early life ==
Fortescue was the eldest son of Hugh Fortescue, 1st Earl Fortescue and Hester Grenville, daughter of Prime Minister George Grenville. He was educated at Eton and Brasenose College, Oxford.

== Career ==
Fortescue (as Ebrington) first became an MP for Barnstaple, just after his 21st birthday; and he sat for various constituencies almost continuously until 1839, when he was summoned to the House of Lords through a writ of acceleration in his father's junior title of Baron Fortescue.

Ebrington had entered Parliament in the 1800s as a Grenvillite connection, belonging to that section of the Whig party that supported the war with Napoleon; but in the following decade (in a generational shift) he broke away from them to join the Young Whigs. Fearing the corruptive effects of militarism on British society, the latter sympathised with the liberalising side of the French Revolution: Ebrington would later publish his conversations with Napoleon in his Elba exile.

After the war, in 1817, Ebrington confirmed his breach with the bulk of his Grenville relatives, and emerged as a prominent pro-Reform Whig—albeit one somewhat unusually rooted in a liberal, morally intense Anglicanism,—which he combined with an interest in political economy. Ebrington strongly condemned the Six Acts as ”the most alarming attack ever made by Parliament upon the liberties and constitution of the country”; and during the 1820s, he would repeatedly promote and vote for Parliamentary Reform.

When the Whigs finally came to power in 1830, Ebrington played a significant part in the passing of the Great Reform Act. After the Commons passed the second bill, Ebrington convened a meeting of 100 reformist Whigs, urging strong measures should the Lords reject it, and acting as leader of a pressure group lobbying the Whig leadership: Ebrington himself appeared on a list of potential peer-creations that was drawn up to increase the pressure on the Lords. When the Government resigned in the face of Tory intransigence in the House of Lords, Ebrington took the lead, despite leadership hesitations, in moving that the House of Commons implore the King “to call to his councils such persons only as will carry into effect unimpaired in all its essential provisions that Bill for reforming the Representation of the people which has recently passed this House”.

During the 1830s, Ebrington led a strong body of Reformist Whigs; and he played a prominent role in establishing Whig party organisation under the new electoral system. In 1839, as Baron Fortescue, he served under Lord Melbourne as Lord Lieutenant of Ireland, until in 1841 he succeeded his father in the earldom. He went on to serve under Lord John Russell as Lord Steward from 1846 to 1850; was sworn of the Privy Council in 1839; and created a Knight of the Garter in 1856.

Fortescue was also Colonel of the 1st Devon Militia, headquartered in Exeter Castle.

== West Buckland School ==
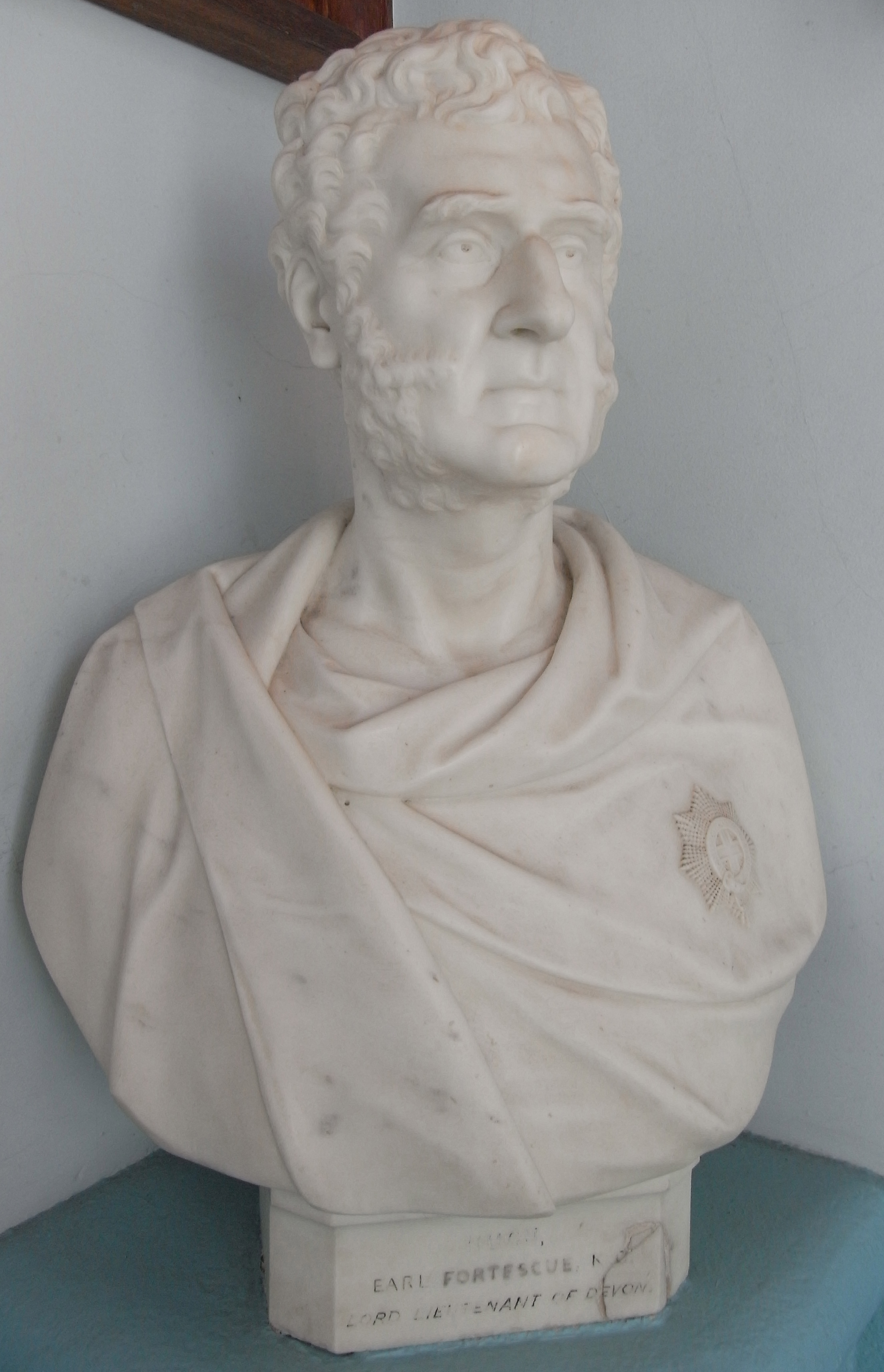
Marble bust of Fortescue at West Buckland School

In 1858, together with the Rev. Joseph Lloyd Brereton, a prebendary of Exeter Cathedral and Rector of West Buckland, Fortescue founded the Devon County School (now called West Buckland School), on land he donated between West and East Buckland, previously part of his North Devon estate centred at Filleigh. The school was intended to provide a top quality education to local boys, including therefore the sons of many of his tenant farmers; it continues today as an independent private school. A marble bust of Fortescue, wearing the Garter Star, sculpted in 1861 by Edward Bowring Stephens, stands on the staircase of the school's Memorial Hall.

== Personal life ==
Fortescue married firstly in 1817 Susan Ryder (died 1827), a daughter of Dudley Ryder, 1st Earl of Harrowby. They had three sons:

- Hugh Fortescue, 3rd Earl Fortescue (1818–1905)
- Hon. John Fortescue, MP
- Hon. Dudley Fortescue, MP

In 1841, fourteen years after the death of his first wife, Fortescue married secondly Elizabeth Geale (died May 1896), a daughter of Piers Geale and the widow of Sir Marcus Somerville, 4th Baronet (c. 1775–1831).

Fortescue died in September 1861, aged 78, and was succeeded by his eldest son from his first marriage, Hugh Fortescue.

== Portraits ==
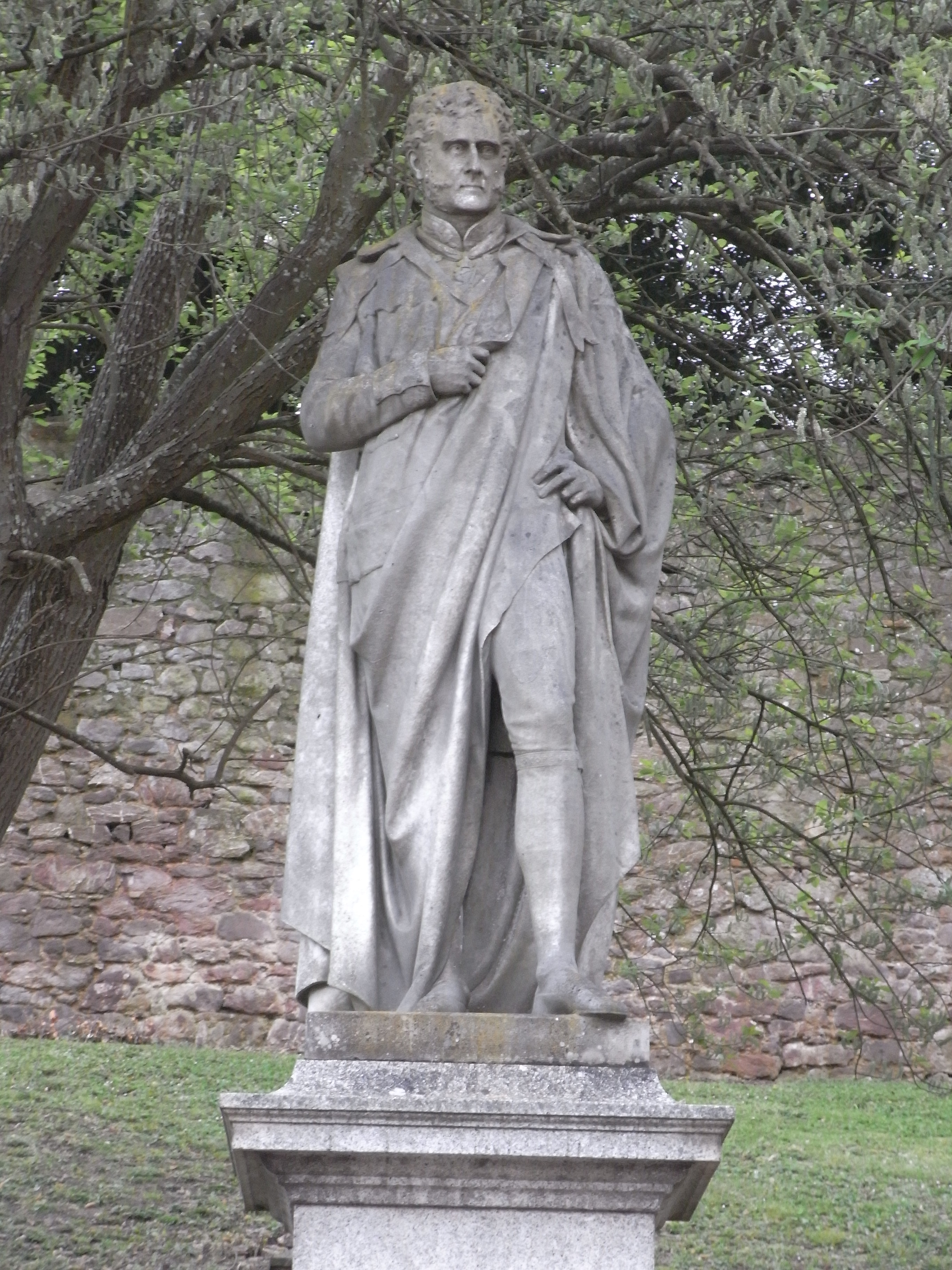
Statue of Fortescue by Edward Bowring Stephens, 1863, in Castle Yard, Exeter

A statue of Fortescue stands in Exeter Castle Yard, and his marble bust is displayed on the staircase of the Memorial Hall in West Buckland School. 49 of the Fortescue family portraits were saved from the disastrous fire at Castle Hill of 9 March 1934 with minor smoke damage, but were shortly afterwards all destroyed by fire when the delivery lorry returning them from the restorer caught fire whilst parked overnight pending their return to Castle Hill.

== Arms ==
Fortescue's coat of arms is blazoned azure, a bend engrailled argent plain cottised or, and the Motto is Forte Scutum Salus Ducum ("A Strong Shield is the Salvation of Leaders").

== Gallery ==
Arms of Fortescue

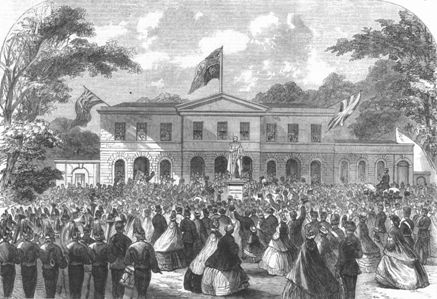
From Illustrated London News: "Inauguration of the Fortescue Memorial in the Castle Yard, Exeter 1863"

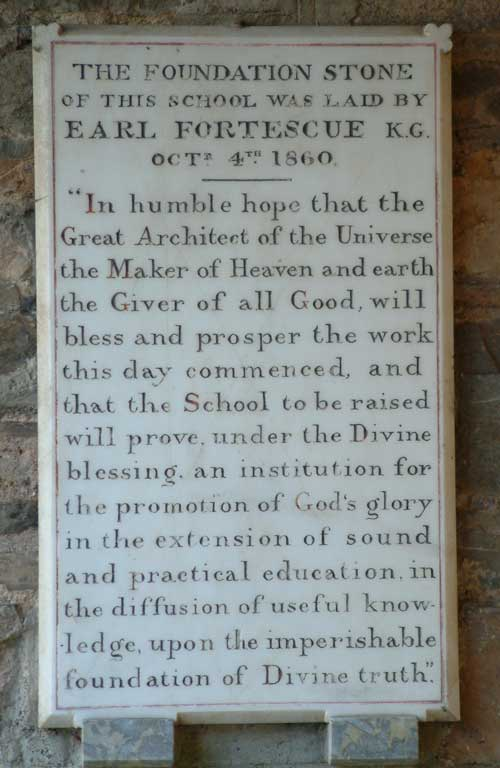
Foundation stone laid at West Buckland School by Earl Fortescue

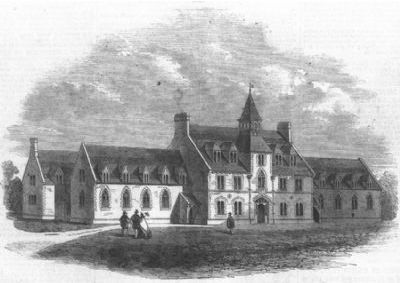
"Devon County School, West Buckland, recently opened by Earl Fortescue", Illustrated London News, 1861

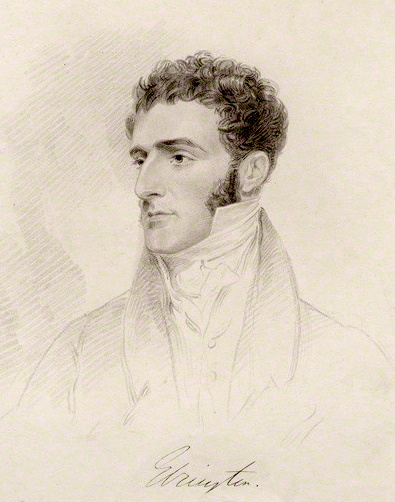
Portrait of Hugh Fortescue when Viscount Ebrington, painted between 1826–1841 by Frederick Christian Lewis Sr, after Joseph Slater. National Portrait Gallery, London, NPG D20597

== Sources ==
- Leigh Rayment's Historical List of MPs

Parliament of the United Kingdom
Preceded by Sir Edward Pellew, Bt; William Devaynes	Member of Parliament for Barnstaple; 1804–1807; With: William Devaynes; William Taylor	Succeeded by George Thellusson; William Taylor
Preceded by William Shipley; Scrope Bernard	Member of Parliament for St Mawes; 1807–1809; With: Scrope Bernard to 1808; Earl Gower from 1808	Succeeded by Scrope Bernard-Morland; Earl Gower
Preceded by Richard Griffin; Lord George Grenville	Member of Parliament for Buckingham; 1812–1817; With: William Fremantle	Succeeded by James Hamilton Stanhope; William Henry Fremantle
Preceded by Sir Thomas Dyke-Acland, Bt; Edmund Pollexfen Bastard	Member of Parliament for Devon; 1818–1820; With: Edmund Pollexfen Bastard	Succeeded by Sir Thomas Dyke-Acland, Bt; Edmund Pollexfen Bastard
Preceded by John Fazakerley; John Peter Grant	Member of Parliament for Tavistock; 1820–1830; With: John Peter Grant to 1826; Lord William Russell 1826–1830; Lord Russell from 1830	Succeeded by Lord John Russell; Lord Russell
Preceded by Sir Thomas Dyke Acland, Bt; Edmund Pollexfen Bastard	Member of Parliament for Devon; 1830–1832; With: Sir Thomas Dyke-Acland, Bt, to 1831; Lord John Russell from 1831	Constituency abolished
New constituency	Member of Parliament for North Devon; 1832–1839; With: Newton Fellowes to 1837; Sir Thomas Dyke Acland, Bt from 1837	Succeeded by Lewis Buck; Sir Thomas Dyke Acland, Bt
Honorary titles
Preceded by The Earl Fortescue	Lord Lieutenant of Devon; 1839–1861	Succeeded by The Duke of Somerset
Preceded by The Earl Fortescue	Vice-Admiral of Devon; 1839–1861	Vacant
Political offices
Preceded by The Earl of Mulgrave	Lord Lieutenant of Ireland; 1839–1841	Succeeded by The Earl de Grey
Preceded by The Earl of Liverpool	Lord Steward; 1846–1850	Succeeded by The Marquess of Westminster
Peerage of Great Britain
Preceded by Hugh Fortescue	Earl Fortescue; 1841–1861	Succeeded by Hugh Fortescue
Preceded by Hugh Fortescue	Baron Fortescue (writ in acceleration) (descended by acceleration); 1839–1859	Succeeded by Hugh Fortescue
