= Mount Boone =

Historic estate in Devon, England

Mount Boone was an historic estate in the parish of Townstal, near Dartmouth in Devon.

== History ==
In about 1630 the estate, the elevated position of which dominates the town of Dartmouth, was purchased by Thomas Boone, a Newfoundland merchant and Member of Parliament for Dartmouth in 1658, a staunch Parliamentarian during the Civil War. "With typical flamboyance" he renamed it Mount Boone. Both Mount Boone and Townstall church were garrisoned for the King in the Civil War, but were taken by storm, with the town of Dartmouth, by General Fairfax, on 19 January 1646. Mount Boone, which was fortified with twenty-two pieces of ordnance, was taken by Colonel Pride, afterwards one of Cromwell's lords. Townstall church, which had ten guns and 100 men, was taken by Colonel Fortescue. In 1689 on the death of his son Charles Boone (1652-1689), MP for Dartmouth in 1689, the male line of the family became extinct. A monument to Thomas Boone (d.1679) survives in St Clement's Church, Townstal. The heiress Mary Boone married a member of the Harris family of Cornworthy, six miles from Dartmouth, and in about 1679, the manor of Norton Dawney (the seat of the ancient lords of the manor of Townstal) was purchased by John Harris, under a decree of the Court of Chancery.

In 1724 the estate with the mediaeval mansion house was purchased by John Seale, a wealthy merchant of the City of London whose family originated at Saint Brélade in Jersey. He purchased much land nearby, including the estate of Coombe. Sir John Henry Seale, 1st Baronet (1780–1844), created a baronet in 1838, was a Whig Member of Parliament for Dartmouth. In 1873 Colonel J.H. Seale sold the estate together with Coombe, to E.W.W. Raleigh, a London surgeon, who built a room in the garden which served as a hospital for the town of Dartmouth until 1887 when the town's first cottage hospital opened in Bayard's Cove as a memorial to the Jubilee of Queen Victoria. The house gradually decayed and was sold with the estate in lots at auction in 1899. In 1905 the Britannia Royal Naval College was built on Mount Boone, and soon afterwards the derelict mansion house of Mount Boone was demolished. Ten separate houses were built on the site.
