= Paul Jodrell =

English physician

Sir Paul Jodrell M.D. (1746–1803) was an English physician, in India in the latter part of his life.

== Life ==
He was second son of Paul Jodrell of Duffield, Derbyshire, solicitor-general to Frederick, Prince of Wales, by Elizabeth, daughter of Richard Warner of North Elmham, Norfolk; Richard Paul Jodrell was his elder brother, and plays by Richard have been wrongly assigned to Paul. He was educated at St John's College, Cambridge, where he graduated B.A. in 1769. He was elected fellow, and proceeded M.A. in 1772, M.D. in 1786. He became a fellow of the Royal Society in 1781.

On 30 September 1786 Jodrell was admitted a candidate of the College of Physicians of London, and a fellow on 1 October 1787. He was appointed physician to the London Hospital on 6 December 1786, but resigned the post in November 1787, when he went to India as physician to the Nawab of Arcot; he had been knighted on 26 October.

Jodrell died on 6 August 1803, at his house on Choaltry Plain, Madras.

== Works ==
Jodrell was author of a farce acted at Covent Garden, but the title is lost. Plays of Richard Paul Jodrell were wrongly assigned to him in David Erskine Baker's Biographia Dramatica of 1812.

== Family ==
With his wife Jane, daughter of Sir Robert Bewicke of Close House, Northumberland, Jodrell had a daughter, Paulina Elizabeth (d. 1862), who married, in June 1804, Sir John Henry Seale, 1st Baronet (died 1844).

The funeral sermon of William Lennox Cleland (d.1832) states that his father Walter Cleland married "the daughter of Sir Paul Joderell"; a codicil to Sir Paul's will left £2000 to "James the son of Catherine Cummins now the wife of Walter Cleland Esqr", although without stating a relationship. However, other sources indicate that Catherine was the protegee of Lady Jodrell, rather than Sir Paul's daughter. In 1790 Sir Paul sued The Asiatic Mirror for libel and defamation when it repeated gossip that Miss Cummings was the mother of his daughter Paulina. Although Sir Paul won the case, the scandal damaged his reputation and led to the Nawab of Arcot withholding his salary.

== Notes ==
Attribution

This article incorporates text from a publication now in the public domain: Lee, Sidney, ed. (1892). "Jodrell, Paul". Dictionary of National Biography. Vol. 29. London: Smith, Elder & Co.
