= Edward Seale (English cricketer) =

English cricketer

Personal information
- Full name: Edward Taylor Seale
- Born: 26 December 1811; Dartmouth, Devon
- Died: 4 May 1893 (aged 81); Totnes, Devon
- Source: Cricinfo, 30 March 2017

Edward Taylor Seale (26 December 1811 – 4 May 1893) was an English priest and cricketer. He played three first-class matches for Cambridge University Cricket Club between 1832 and 1835. He was born at Dartmouth, Devon and died at Morleigh, also in Devon.

Seale was the third son of Sir John Henry Seale, 1st Baronet, a substantial landowner and MP for Dartmouth. He was educated at Winchester College and at Trinity College, Cambridge. He appeared for Cambridge University in cricket matches that have since been deemed first-class in 1832, 1834 and 1835, and in another of lesser status in 1837; his highest score in five first-class innings was only 7, and there is no record that he bowled.

Although Seale matriculated at Cambridge University in 1831, he did not graduate until 1839, when he took a Bachelor of Arts degree. He was ordained as a deacon in 1840 and as a Church of England priest in 1841, and became rector of Blackawton, Devon from 1841 to 1864 and of Morleigh also from 1841, remaining in post there until his death.

== See also ==
- List of Cambridge University Cricket Club players
