= Seale baronets =

Baronetcy in the Baronetage of the United Kingdom

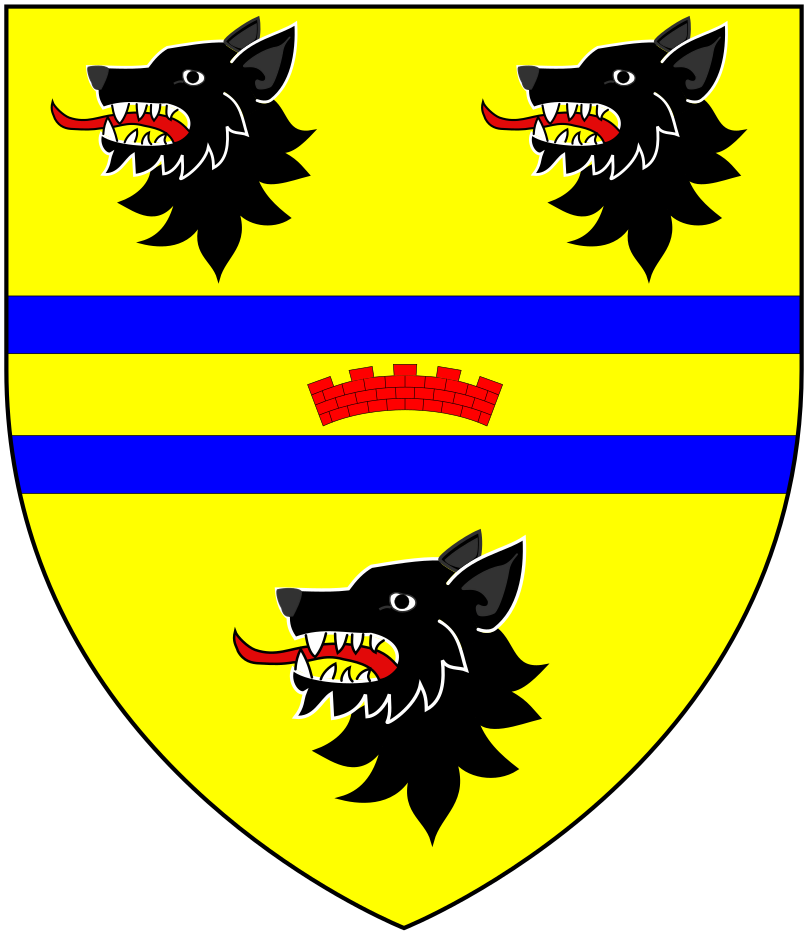
Arms of Seale: Or, two barrulets azure between three wolf's heads erased sable in the fess point a mural crown gules

The Seale baronetcy, of Mount Boone in the County of Devon, is a title in the Baronetage of the United Kingdom. It was created on 31 July 1838 for John Henry Seale, Whig Member of Parliament for Dartmouth from 1832 to 1844. The second Baronet was sixteen times Mayor of Dartmouth.

The family descended from John Seale (born c.1512) of St Brelade in Jersey, a descendant of Robert Seale (or Scelle) a gens de bien of St Brelade 1292. In 1720 the 1st Baronet's grandfather John Seale, purchased the estate of Mount Boone near Dartmouth. The latter's great-grandfather was John Seale, Constable of St Brelade 1644–51, the son of John Seale, Constable of St Brelade 1615–21.

== Seale baronets, of Mount Boone (1838) ==
- Sir John Henry Seale, 1st Baronet (1780–1844)
- Sir Henry Paul Seale, 2nd Baronet (1806–1897)
- Sir John Henry Seale, 3rd Baronet (1843–1914)
- Sir John Carteret Hyde Seale, 4th Baronet (1881–1964)
- Sir John Henry Seale, 5th Baronet (1921–2017)
- Sir (John) Robert Charters Seale, 6th Baronet (1954–2026)
- Sir Christopher Charles Seale, 7th Baronet (born 2002)

The heir presumptive is the present holder's twin brother Joshua Taylor Seale (born 2002).

== Notes ==
Baronetage of the United Kingdom
Preceded by Shakerley baronets	Seale baronets of Mount Boone; 31 July 1838	Succeeded by Marwood-Elton baronets
