= Edmund Bastard (politician) =

British politician

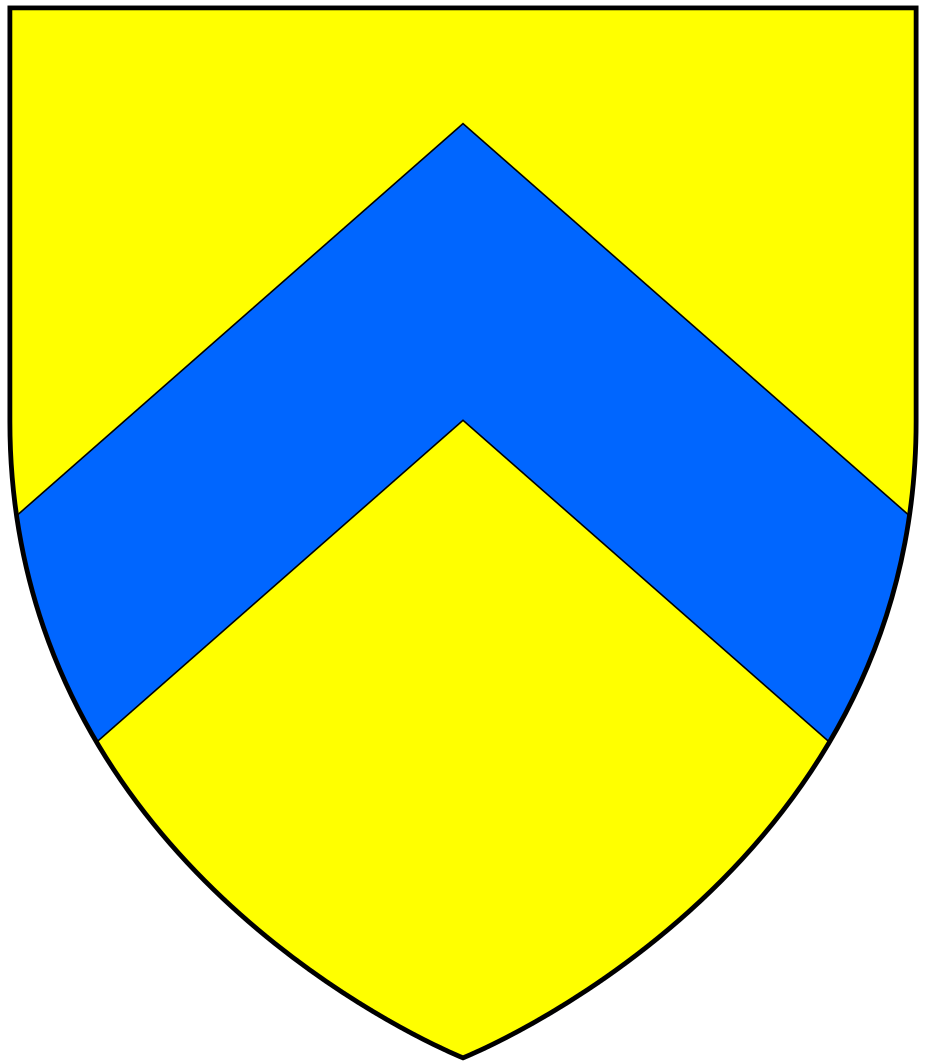
Arms of Bastard: Or, a chevron azure

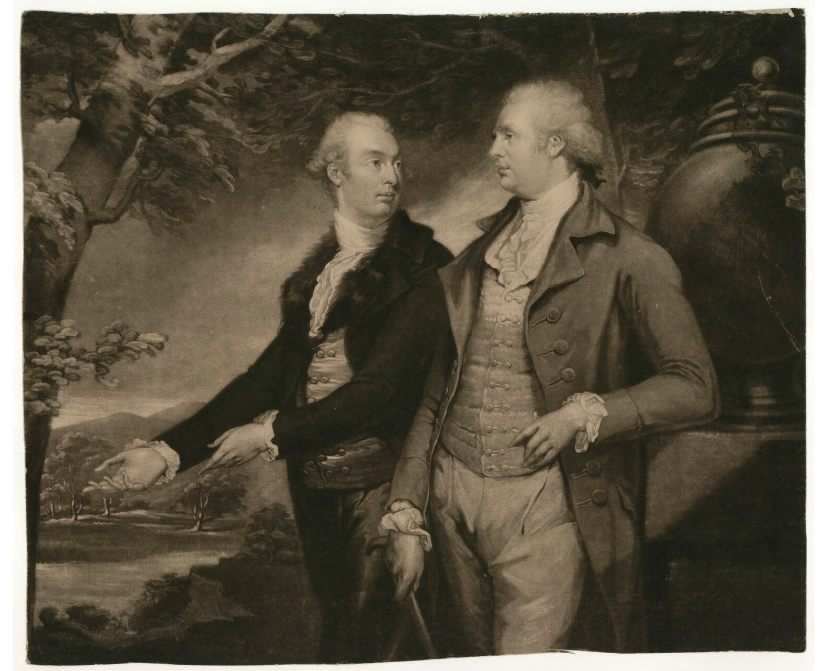
John Pollexfen Bastard (left) and Edmund Bastard (right), etching by Samuel William Reynolds, after James Northcote (1795), the National Portrait Gallery.

Edmund Bastard (1758–1816) of Sharpham, Ashprington, Devon, was a British Tory politician. He was the second son of Colonel William Bastard of Kitley House, Yealmpton, Devon by his wife Anne Worsley.

He was Member of Parliament (MP) for Dartmouth from 1787 to 1812. In 1787, he was elected unopposed, after in August 1787 George Rose recommended him to William Pitt. In the Parliament, only two speeches of him are recorded, on 26 and 28 May 1788, on a bill to regulate fishery in Newfoundland. This was related to the position of Dartmouth as one of the main ports of the Newfoundland trade.

On 1 July 1783 Bastard married Jane Pownoll (died 1822), daughter and heiress of Captain Philemon Pownoll (died 1780), Royal Navy, the builder of Sharpham House, by whom he had children including his eldest son and heir, Edmund Pollexfen Bastard (1784–1838), who succeeded John Pollexfen Bastard as MP for Devonshire; and second son, Captain John Bastard (died 1835), Royal Navy, of Sharpham, who succeeded his father as member for Dartmouth. Bastard died in June 1816.

== Disambiguation ==
John Pollexfen Bastard—John Bastard RN and Edmund Pollexfen Bastard—Edmund Bastard

William Bastard 1727–1782	Anne Worsley
John Pollexfen Bastard; 1756–1816	Edmund Bastard; 1758–1816	Jane Pownoll
Edmund Pollexfen Bastard; 1784–1838	John Bastard RN; 1787–1835	Rev. P. P. Bastard

Parliament of Great Britain
Preceded by Arthur Holdsworth; Richard Hopkins	Member of Parliament for Dartmouth; 1787–1812; With: Richard Hopkins 1787–1790; John Charles Villiers 1790–1801	Succeeded by Parliament of the United Kingdom
Parliament of the United Kingdom
Preceded by Parliament of Great Britain	Member of Parliament for Dartmouth; 1801–1812; With: John Charles Villiers 1801–1802; Arthur Howe Holdsworth 1802–1812	Succeeded by Arthur Howe Holdsworth; Edmund Pollexfen Bastard
