= Edmund Pollexfen Bastard =

British Tory politician

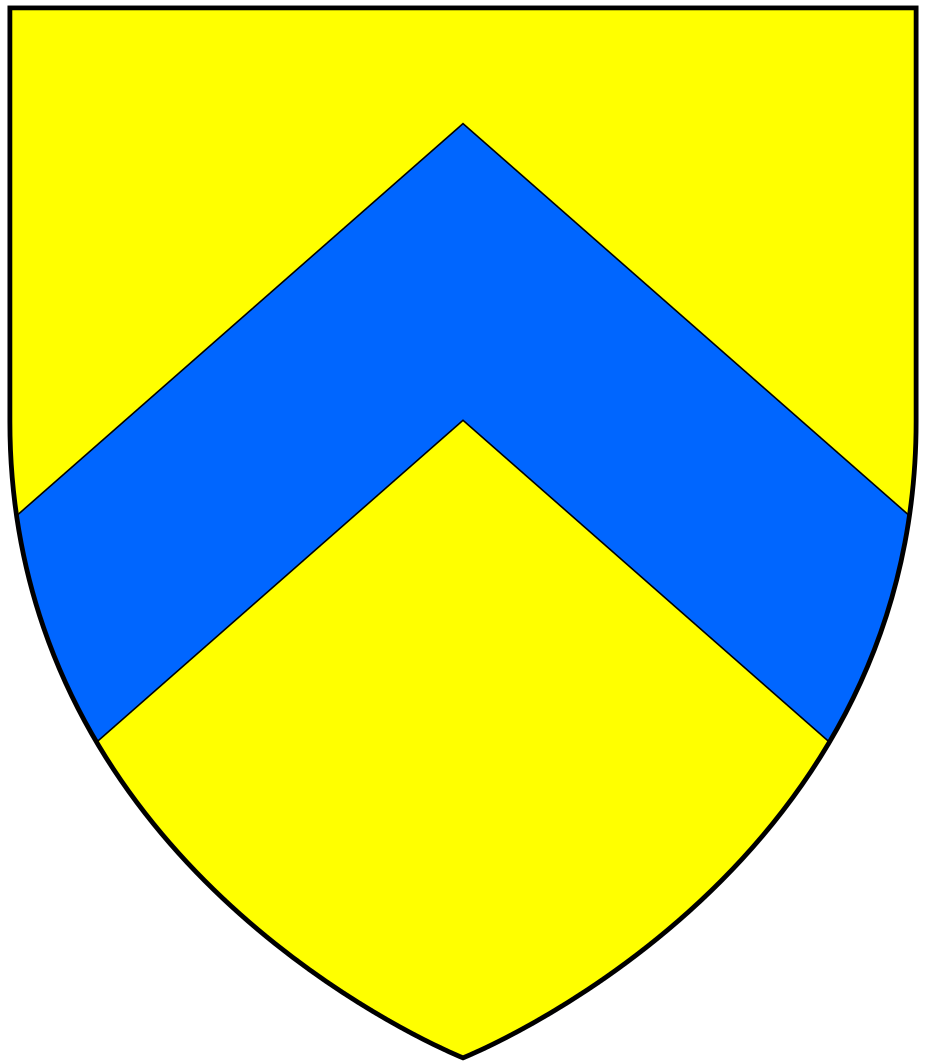
Arms of Bastard: Or, a chevron azure

Edmund Pollexfen Bastard (12 July 1784 – 8 June 1838) was a British Tory politician, son of Edmund Bastard and his wife Jane Pownoll. He married Anne Jane Rodney, granddaughter of Admiral Rodney.

He succeeded his father as Member of Parliament (MP) for Dartmouth from 1812 to 1816 when that seat was taken by his younger brother, John Bastard.

In the same election Edmund succeeded his uncle, John Pollexfen Bastard, as MP for Devonshire from 1816 to 1830.

He was appointed High Sheriff of Devon for 1834.

== Disambiguation ==
John Pollexfen Bastard—John Bastard RN and Edmund Pollexfen Bastard—Edmund Bastard

William Bastard 1727-1782	Anne Worsley
John Pollexfen Bastard; 1756-1816	Edmund Bastard; 1758-1816	Jane Pownoll
Edmund Pollexfen Bastard; 1784-1838	John Bastard RN; 1787-1835	Rev P P Bastard

Parliament of the United Kingdom
Preceded by Arthur Howe Holdsworth; Edmund Bastard	Member of Parliament for Dartmouth; 1812–1816; With: Arthur Howe Holdsworth	Succeeded by Arthur Howe Holdsworth; John Bastard
Preceded by John Pollexfen Bastard; Sir Thomas Dyke Acland	Member of Parliament for Devonshire; 1816–1830; With: Sir Thomas Dyke Acland, to 1818; The Viscount Ebrington, later Earl Fortescue 1818–1820; Sir Thomas Dyke Acland, from 1820	Succeeded by Sir Thomas Dyke Acland; The Viscount Ebrington
