= Sir John Henry Seale, 1st Baronet =

Whig Member of Parliament for Dartmouth in 1838

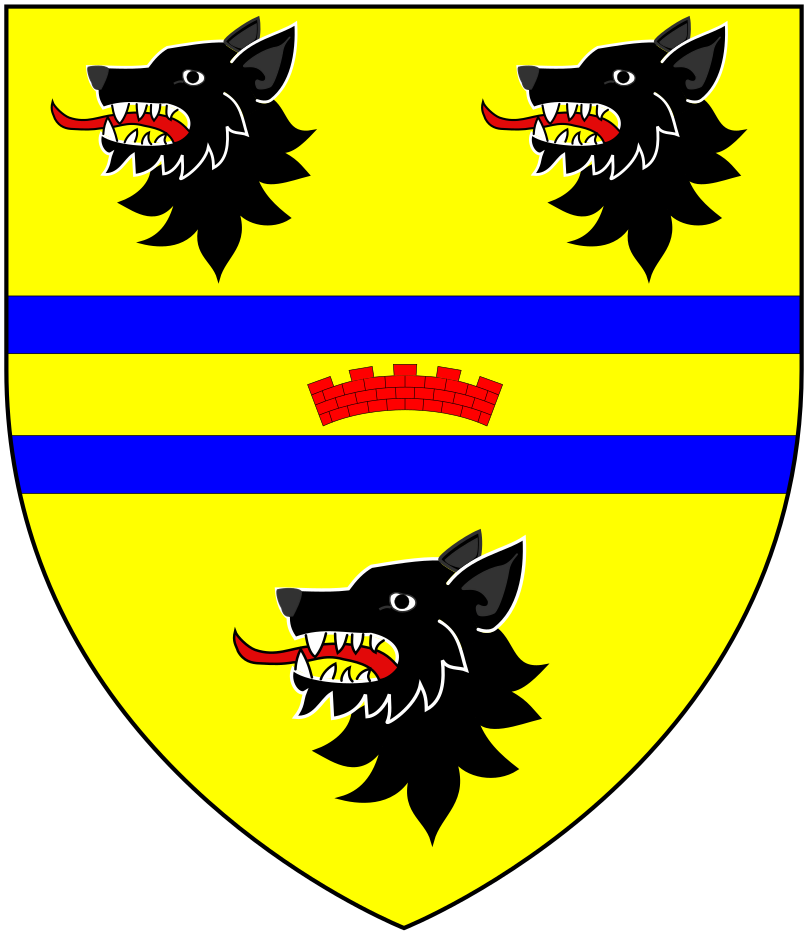
Arms of Seale: Or, two barrulets azure between three wolf's heads erased sable in the fess point a mural crown gules

Sir John Henry Seale, 1st Baronet (1780–1844) of Mount Boone in the parish of Townstal near Dartmouth in Devon, was a Whig Member of Parliament for Dartmouth in 1838. He was created a baronet on 31 July 1838. He owned substantial lands in Devon, mainly at Townstal and Mount Boone. Together with the Earl of Morley of Saltram House near Plymouth, he built several bridges in Dartmouth, most notably the Dart crossing. Arthur Howe Holdsworth's, the previous Member of Parliament in Dartmouth, influence over the pocket borough of Dartmouth ceased after the 1832 Reform Act and subsequently he was in competition for that parliamentary seat with John Seale, who won the seat.

The family descended from John Seale (born c. 1512) of St Brelade in Jersey, a descendant of Robert Seale (or Scelle) a gens de bien of St Brelade 1292. In 1720 the 1st Baronet's grandfather John Seale, purchased the estate of Mount Boone near Dartmouth. The latter's great-grandfather was John Seale, Constable of St Brelade 1644-51, the son of John Seale, Constable of St Brelade 1615-21.

== Marriage and children ==
In 1804 he married Paulina Elizabeth Jodrell, daughter of the physician Sir Paul Jodrell (1746–1803), M.D., by whom he had children including:

- Sir Henry Paul Seale, 2nd Baronet (1806–1897) of Mount Boone, eldest son and heir, sixteen times Mayor of Dartmouth, who also contributed to building infrastructure in Dartmouth.
- Charles I Seale-Hayne (died 1842), second son, heir to his childless great-uncle Charles II Hayne (1747–1821), of Lupton, Brixham and Fuge House, Blackawton, Sheriff of Devon in 1772 and Colonel of the North Devon Militia. The Hayne family had come to prominence in the person of John Hayne (died 1671) (grandfather of Cornelius Hayne), a merchant at Dartmouth during the reign of King Charles I (1625–1649), who had "acquired by inheritance and purchase various properties in Devon". In accordance with the bequest he adopted the additional surname of Hayne. His son and heir was Charles II Seale-Hayne (1833–1903), of Fuge House and Kingswear Castle, Dartmouth harbour, Member of Parliament for Ashburton in Devon (1885–1903) and Paymaster General (1892–1895), who by his will founded Seale-Hayne College near Newton Abbot in Devon.
- Edward Taylor Seale (1811–1893), Cambridge University cricketer and priest in charge of South Devon parishes, 1841 to 1893.
- Robert Bewick Seale (1815–1881), lawyer.

Baronetage of the United Kingdom
New creation	Baronet (of Mount Boone); 1838–1844	Succeeded by Henry Paul Seale
