= Lucy Ash (artist) =

British-Canadian visual artist

Lucy Ash (born 1955) is a British-Canadian visual artist based in London. Through painting and mixed media, Ash's work explores themes of visibility, equality, freedom, social and climate justice. Her public exhibitions have highlighted diversity and often-overlooked stories of LGBTIQ+ individuals across history.

== Early life and education ==
Ash was born in London to Canadian-born mother Dulcie Orme and British father Michael Edward Ash, a mathematician and brewing engineer. Her uncle was environmentalist Maurice Anthony Ash; her grandfather was civil engineer Wilfrid Cracroft Ash. She attended Millfield (Somerset) and went on to study at studied at Central School of Art and Design before completing a BA in Sculpture at Camberwell College of Art.

== Career ==
Ash began her career in film animation, an influence reflected in the storyboard-like narrative structure of her later paintings. During this period she wrote two cookbooks, A Taste of Astrology (1988, Alfred A. Knopf) and The Astrological Cookbook (1993, Sainsbury's), while continuing her artistic practice.

Ash's paintings are frequently portraits highlighting the diversity and often-overlooked stories of LGBTIQ+ individuals across history. An exhibition of her work at the William Road Gallery, London, in 2011, titled Wrong Place, Wrong Time, addressed hate crimes, following the homophobic assault on Ian Baynham in Trafalgar Square in 2009; Baynham died from his injuries 18 days later. Ash has said the attack, and her friendship with Baynham's sister, Jen, was a catalyst for later work, including a 2020–2023 project for Southampton City Art Gallery.

Two of Ash's community-created artworks, Portraits of Inspiration (2020–2022, collection of Southampton City Art Gallery), feature hundreds of individual canvases painted by the public and by figures from the LGBTIQ+ community, developed to celebrate diversity and highlight LGBTIQ+ role models.

In 2024, Ash was chosen as the Honorary Art Advisor and a judge for the UK's first national memorial for LGBT+ armed forces personnel, titled 'An Opened Letter', located at The National Memorial Arboretum, Staffordshire.

== Exhibitions ==
Ash's work has been exhibited in group and solo exhibitions in the UK, United States, and Netherlands, including a one-woman show, 49 Frames of Love, which transferred from the William Road Gallery to The Heartbreak Gallery in Marylebone, London, in 2012, and a one-woman show, Pieces of Eight, at the West Ox Arts Gallery, Oxfordshire, in 2016.

Solo exhibitions include Invisible Portraits at Southampton City Art Gallery (2022–2023) and, in collaboration with Southampton City Art Gallery and the High Commission of Canada, at Canada House Gallery, London (2026).

== Public collections ==
- Iris 02 (2018), Southampton City Art Gallery
- Portraits of Inspiration, Panels 1 and 2 (2020–2022), Southampton City Art Gallery

== Publications ==
- A Taste of Astrology (1988), Alfred A. Knopf
- The Astrological Cookbook (1993), Sainsbury's
- Invisible Portraits (2023), Southampton City Art Gallery
