= John Giles =

John Giles or Gyles may refer to:

== Politicians ==
- John Gyles (MP) (died c. 1406), MP for Dover
- John Giles (MP fl. 1417–1435), MP for Old Sarum, Marlborough, Calne, Wilton and Devizes
- John Giles (died 1553), MP for Totnes
- John Giles (died 1606) (c. 1533–1606), MP for Totnes
- John Godkin Giles (1834–1903), Ontario medical doctor and political figure
- John Giles (American politician) (born 1960), Lieutenant Governor-elect of Arizona

== Others ==
- John Gyles (c. 1680–1755), American soldier and interpreter of American-Indian dialects
- John Allen Giles (1808–1884), English historian
- John Giles (priest) (1812–1867), Archdeacon of Stow from 1862 to 1867
- John Giles (architect) (1831–1900), British architect
- John K. Giles (1895–1979), American criminal
- John Laurent Giles (1901–1969), naval architect
- John Giles (athlete) (1927–2024), British athlete
- Johnny Giles (Michael John Giles; born 1940), Irish footballer, manager and television pundit
- John Giles (snooker player) (born 1969), English snooker player
