= Action of 31 January 1779 =

Single-ship action of the American War of Independence

- Part of the American Revolutionary War
Date	31 January 1779
Location	off Saint-Brieuc, France
Result	British victory

Belligerents
Great Britain	France

Commanders and leaders
Philemon Pownoll	Chevalier de Tarade

Strength
1 frigate	1 frigate

Casualties and losses
6 killed & 22 wounded	1 frigate captured 33 killed 180 wounded or captured

The action of 31 January 1779 was a naval engagement that took place off the coast of Brittany during the American Revolutionary War between a Royal Navy frigate HMS Apollo and the French Navy frigate Oiseau. The action resulted in the British capture of the French vessel.

== Background ==
The war between France and Great Britain had been but six months old. HMS Apollo, commanded by Captain Philemon Pownall was cruising off Brittany, where on the morning of 31 January he fell in with a convoy of French vessels off the town of Saint-Brieuc. Pownoll found that the French consisted of nine merchantmen and an escort frigate, the Oiseau of 32 guns. Oiseau under the command of Lieutenant le Chevalier de Tarade had left Brest the day before and was in convoy with the merchant ships proceeding to St. Malo.

Apollo carried a crew of 222 and was armed with twenty-six 12-pounder cannons on her upper gun-deck and six 6-pounder cannons on her forecastle and quarterdeck. Oiseau, had first been commissioned in 1770 and was armed with twenty-six 9-pounder cannons on her main-deck and six 4-pounder cannons on her forecastle and quarterdeck.

== Combat ==
Tarade, signalled the cutter Expéditive to lead the convoy, and detached to attack Apollo. Although outgunned by Apollo, Oiseau had a marginally larger crew of two hundred and twenty-four men. The convoy, took the opportunity to flee for the shoals and rocks of Île-de-Bréhat.

The action progressed with the two frigates yardarm to yardarm, and with the Apollos bowsprit occasionally piercing her adversary's foremast shrouds. With the cannon fire stilling the wind the French were unable to escape from the British frigate's heavy pounding.

Within two hours the French ship had been battered - Tarade had just four men with him on his quarterdeck left standing and the Oiseau had lost her foretop and mizzen masts having been shot away. The hull had been ridden with shot, and her cannon silenced. A lucky shot had carried away Oiseau's large flag, the French fleur de lys. A call came out for the French ship to surrender but there was no response. Pownoll then sent a boarding party over to the Oiseau – and another call to surrender was given, this time the badly injured Tarade surrendered the ship.

== Aftermath ==
The British had lost six men killed and twenty-two wounded, two of them mortally. French losses were heavier some 33 killed with the rest wounded and captured. Both commanders were among the injured, Pownall having received a musket ball in his chest and his two lieutenants were also been wounded. Calm weather allowed the Apollos men to keep the badly damaged Oiseau afloat, and she was carried in to Plymouth, and later bought into the navy as HMS Oiseau.

Pownoll was killed during an action with the French privateer Stanislas in the Channel on 15 June the following year.
