= Sharpham, Ashprington =

Historic estate in Devon, England

Coordinates: 50.4090°N 3.6521°W

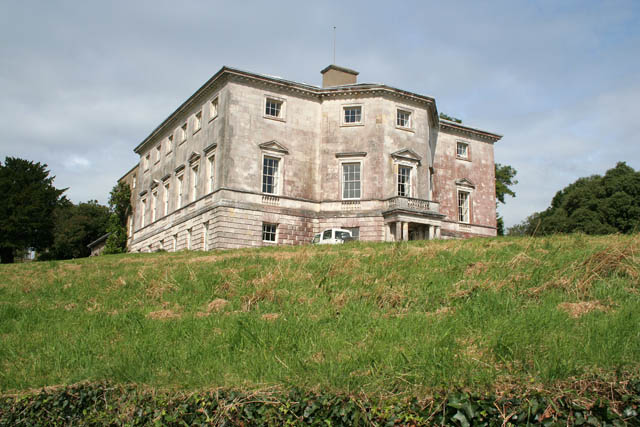
Sharpham House, Ashprington, Devon, commenced in about 1770 by Captain Philemon Pownoll to the designs of the architect Sir Robert Taylor

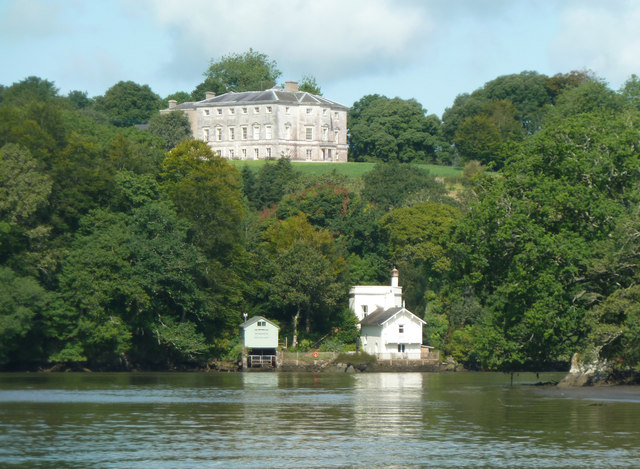
Setting of Sharpham House above the River Dart

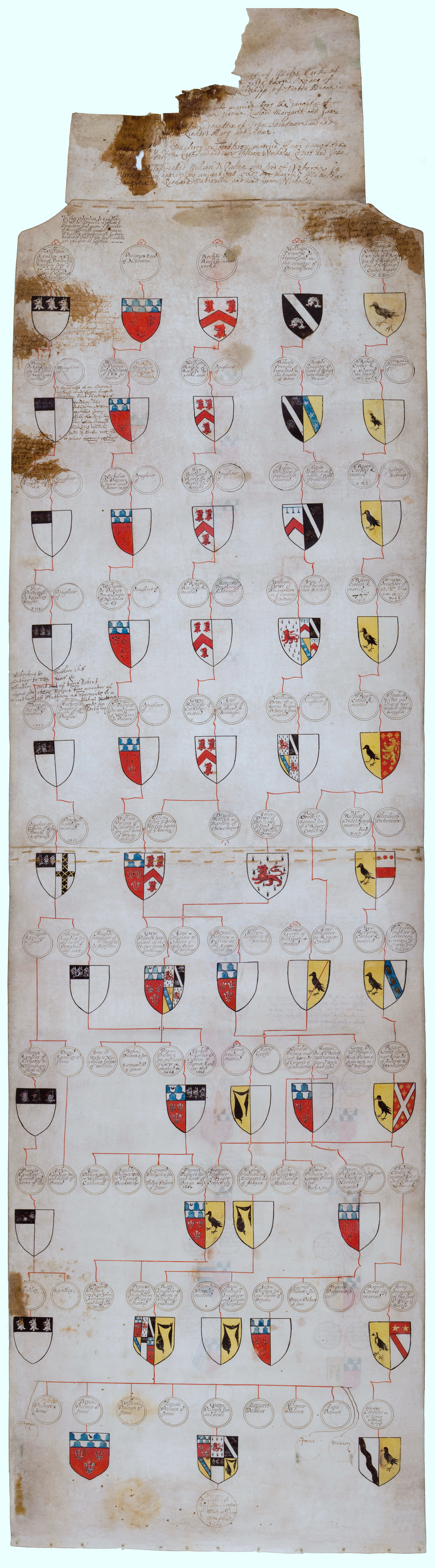
Palmes family heraldic pedigree roll (early 17th c.) showing part of the descent of Sharpham

Sharpham is an historic estate in the parish of Ashprington, Devon. The Georgian mansion house, known as Sharpham House, overlooks the River Dart and is a Grade I listed building. The house was commenced in about 1770 by the Royal Navy captain Philemon Pownoll (died 1780) to the designs of the architect Sir Robert Taylor (1714–1788). In the opinion of Nikolaus Pevsner it contains "one of the most spectacular and daring later 18th century staircase designs anywhere in England". The park and gardens are Grade II* listed in the National Register of Historic Parks and Gardens. Part of the descent of Sharpham is shown on the Palmes family heraldic pedigree roll.

== Descent ==
=== Winard ===
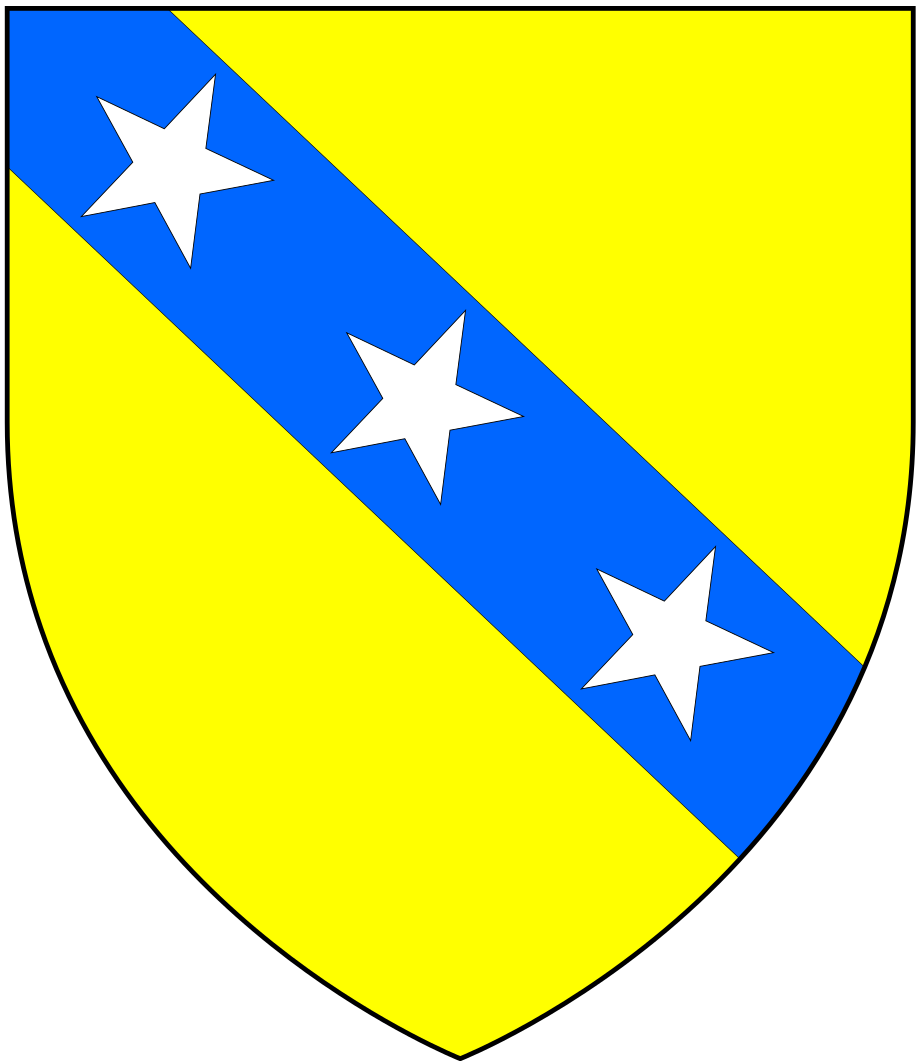
Arms of Winard of Wonford and Sharpham: Or, on a bend azure three mullets argent

Robert Winard (or Wynard) of Sharpham died without male progeny leaving a daughter and heiress Anne Winard, who married Robert French.

=== French ===
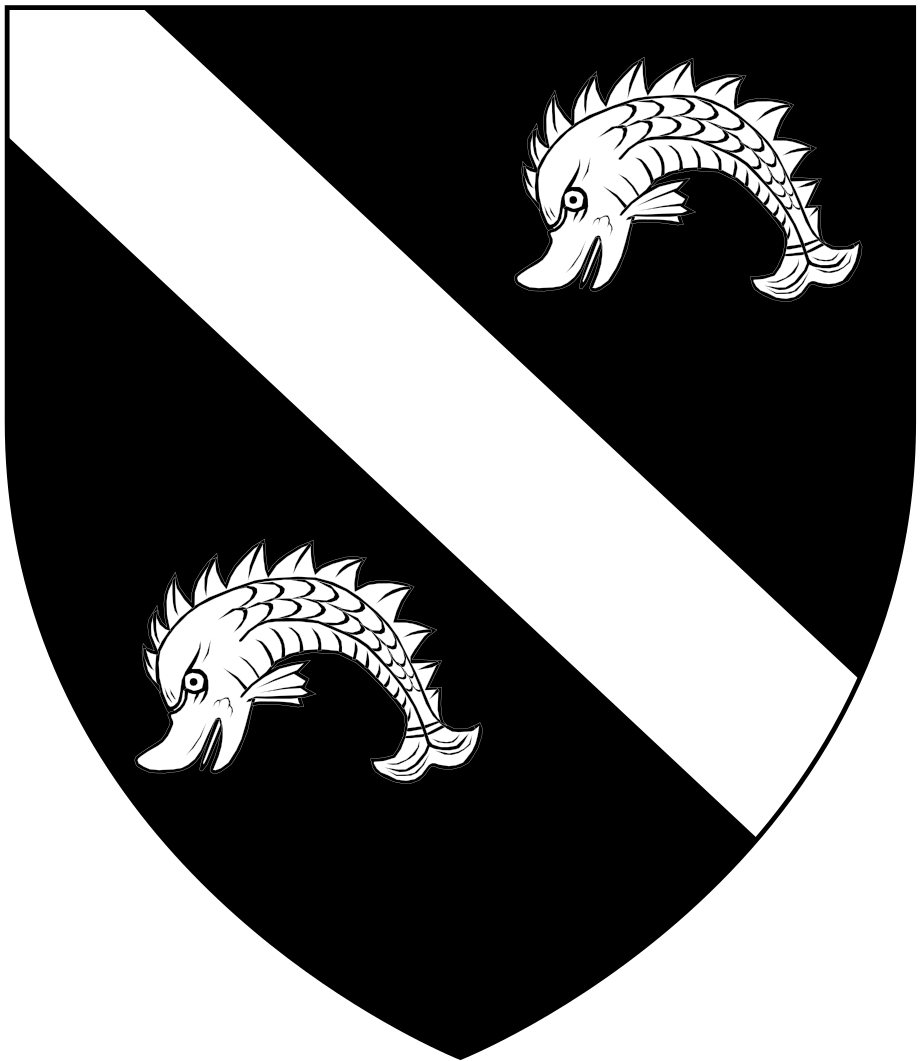
Arms of French of Sharpham: Sable, a bend between two dolphins hauriant argent

Robert French (fl. 1377–1386) of Totnes, a Member of Parliament for Totnes in January 1377, November 1384, 1385 and 1386, married Anne Winard, daughter and heiress of Robert Winard of Sharpham. In the 15th century it was owned by Robert French of Horneford in Devon, whose daughter and heiress Amey (or Maude) French married (as his second wife) Sir John Prideaux (fl. 1433).

=== Prideaux ===
Sir John Prideaux (fl. 1433) of Adeston in the parish of Holbeton and of Orcheton in the parish of Modbury, Devon married Anne [or Maude], heiress of John Sharpham. Her daughter and heiress was Joane Prideaux, who married firstly to William Drewe, secondly to Baldwin Acland of Acland, Landkey, Devon, ancestor of the Acland Baronets. Sharpham descended thenceforth in the Drewe family as follows:

=== Drewe ===
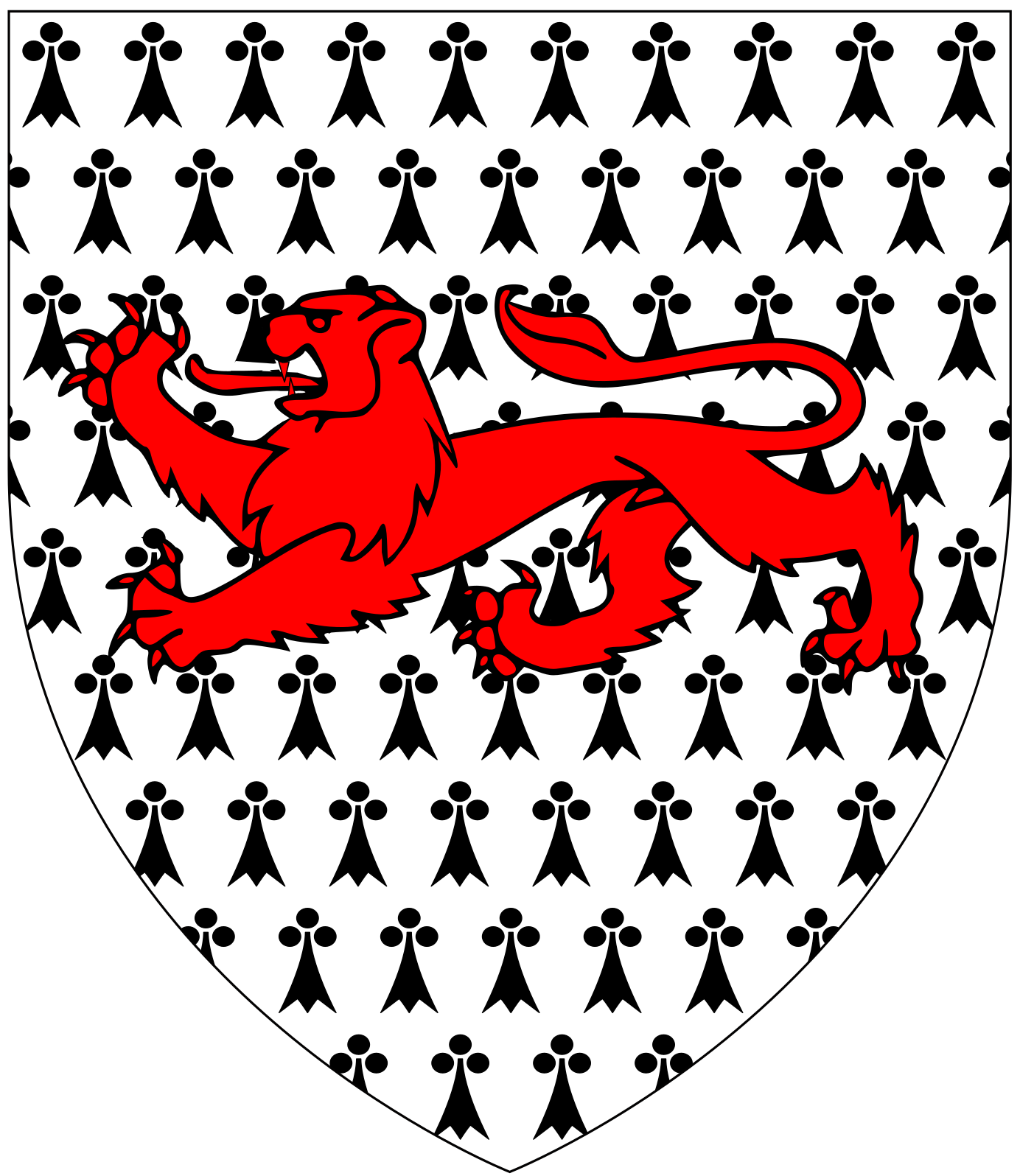
Arms of Drewe of Sharpham and of The Grange, Broadhembury, Devon: Ermine, a lion passant gules

- William Drewe (died 1548), 3rd son, of Kenn in Devon, who married a certain Elinor
- John Drewe, son, a lawyer of Gray's Inn, who married Joane Cruwys a daughter of a member of the Cruwys family of Cruwys Morchard, Devon.
- John Drewe (died 1574), of St Leonard's, Devon, son and heir and heir to his grandfather. He married twice, firstly to Anne Yorke, daughter of Watkyn Yorke of Devon, secondly to a lady of the Bridges family.
- Thomas Drewe, son, of Sharpham and Killerton, Devon, who married Elinor Hackmore, daughter and co-heiress of William Hackmore.
- Edward Drewe (c. 1542 – 1598), son, of Sharpham, a Serjeant-at-Law to Queen Elizabeth I, MP for Lyme Regis 1584, twice for Exeter in 1586 and 1589 and for the prestigious seat of the City of London in 1593. He purchased the estate of The Grange in the parish of Broadhembury, the former grange of Dunkeswell Abbey, where he built himself a new mansion house. He moved his residence to The Grange and sold Sharpham to John Giles of Bowden, an adjacent estate. Edward Drewe married Bridget FitzWilliam of Mablethorpe, Lincolnshire, by whom he had a son and heir Sir Thomas Drewe (died 1651) of The Grange, Sheriff of Devon in 1612, who sold Killerton to Sir Arthur Acland (died 1610) of Acland, Landkey.

=== Giles ===
- John Giles (died 1606) of Bowden, an adjacent estate in Ashprington, who purchased Sharpham from Edward Drewe. He was the eldest son of William Giles of Bowden by his wife Joane Blackall (alias Blackaller) of Totnes. He married Agnes Stucley, a daughter of Sir Hugh Stucley (1496–1559) of Affeton, Devon, Sheriff of Devon in 1545.
- Sir Edward Giles (1566–1637), Knight, eldest son and heir, of Bowden, who at the time of the writing of the Survey of Devon by Tristram Risdon (died 1640), was the owner of Sharpham. He married Mary Drew (died 1642/3), daughter and heiress of Edmond Drew of Hayne, Newton St Cyres, Devon (who bore the same arms as Drew of Sharpham but whose kinship to that family is not clear), widow of Walter Northcote. He died without children.

=== Yarde ===
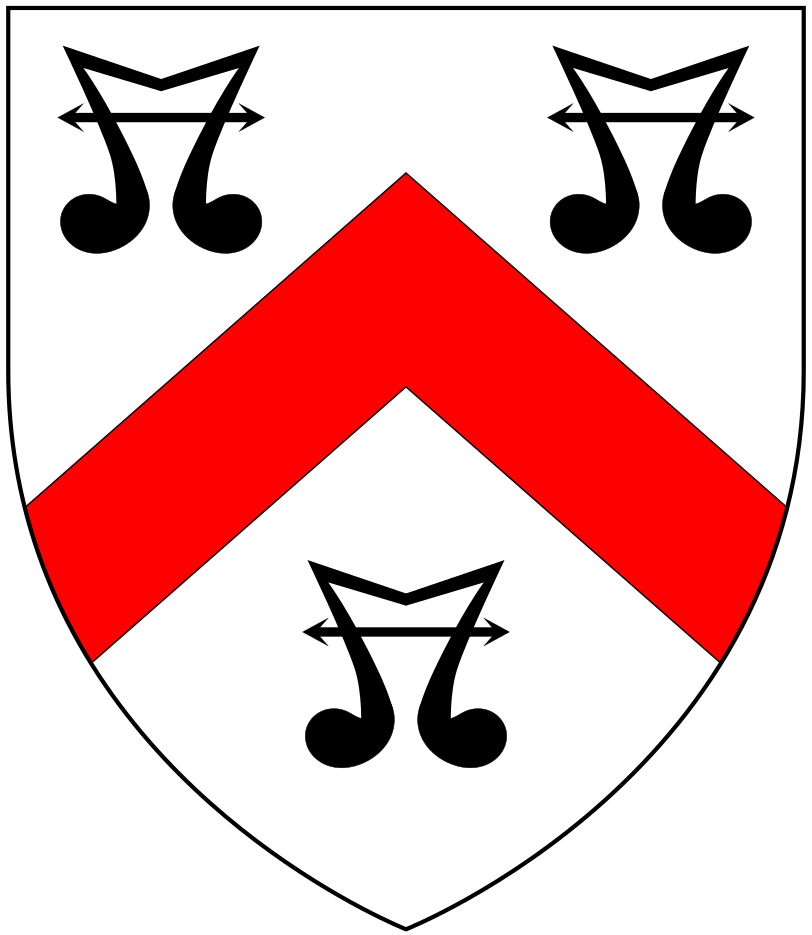
Arms of Yard: Argent, a chevron gules between three water bougets sable

The Giles family sold Sharpham to the Yarde family of Bradley in the parish of Kingsteignton.

- Gilbert Yard (1672/3-1707), of Sharpham, was MP for Ashburton 1705-7. He was buried at Ashprington. He was the eldest son of Gilbert Yarde (died 1692) of Bradley by his wife Elizabeth Northleigh, daughter of Henry I Northleigh of Peamore, Exminster and sister of Henry II Northleigh (1643–1694) of Peamore, three times MP for Okehampton. In 1694/5 he married Joane Blackaller (died 1725), daughter of Henry Blackaller "of Sharpham".
- Gilbert Yarde (born 1698), son and heir, of Sharpham, living in 1725.

=== Cockey ===
In 1748 Sharpham was sold by Gilbert Yard to Philip Cockey, who was seemingly more interested in the resale value of the timber in the park than in the house. The sale particulars described the estate as having extensive woodlands, a mansion house and several walled gardens. These are visible on a survey of 1749. A marriage contract for the sum of £200 dated 1749 survives in Plymouth and West Devon Record Office listing as parties: 1: William Cockey of Totnes, brazier; 2: Elizabeth Hannaford of Totnes, spinster; 3: Philip Cockey of Sharpham, gentleman and Benjamin Blackaller of Totnes, mercer. Another document dated 1763 survives in Cornwall Record Office summarised as follows: Parties: (1) William Shepherd and John Bayly both of Plymouth, merchants, to (2) Philip Cockey of Sharpham, Devon, esquire, Richard Dunning of Plymouth, gentleman, Peter Baron of Stoke Damerel, gentleman and Robert Baron of Plymouth, brazier. Bond in £500 To indemnify (2) against cost of lawsuits concerning Presbyterian church in Plymouth. In 1765 Philip Cockey sold Sharpham to Captain Philemon Pownoll, having previously in 1755 offered a lease on the estate.

=== Pownoll ===
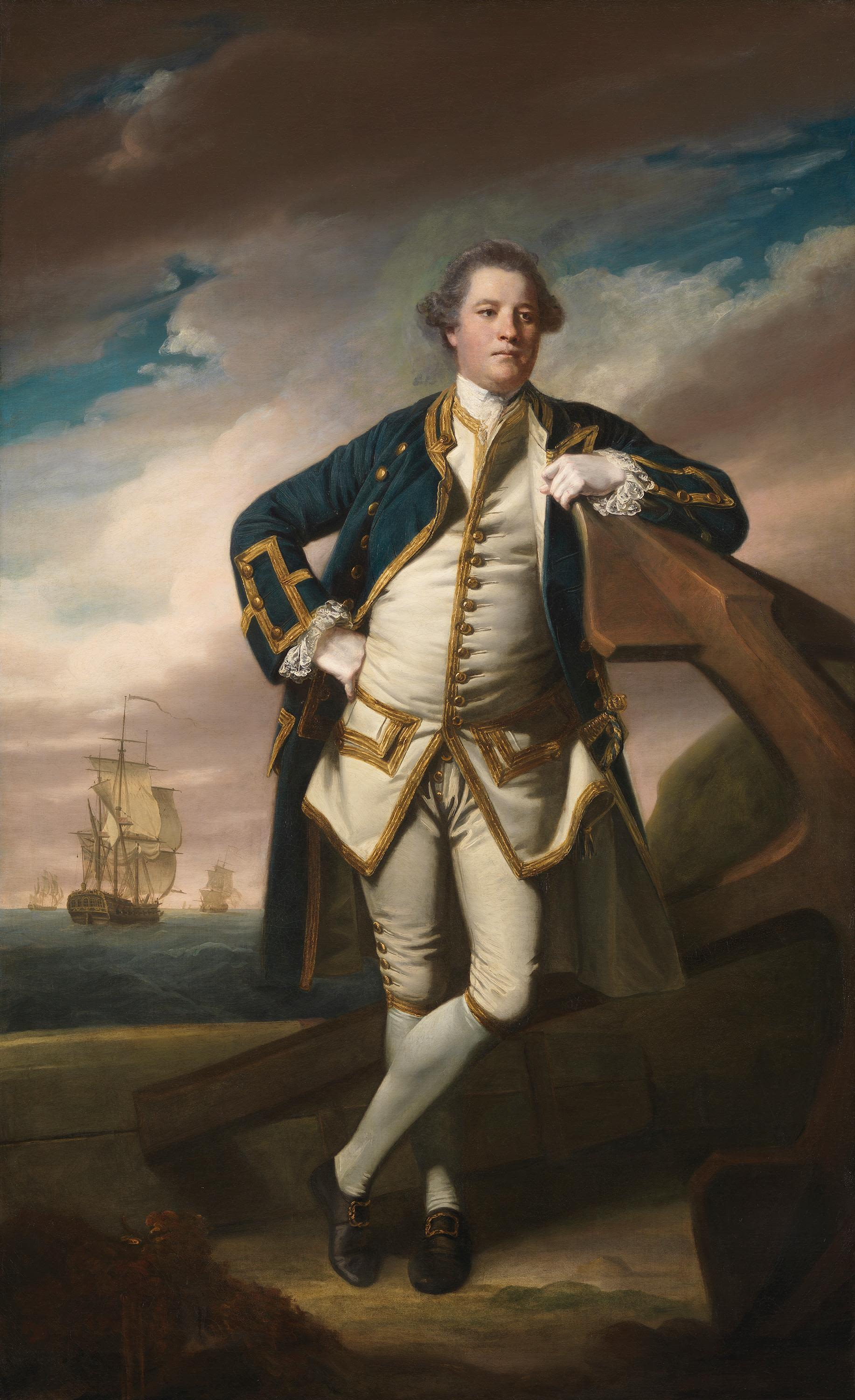
Captain Philemon Pownoll (died 1780), builder of Sharpham House. Portrait by Sir Joshua Reynolds

Mr Cockey sold it in about 1763 to Captain Philemon Pownoll (c. 1734 – 1780) of the Royal Navy, born in Plymouth and the son of master shipwright Israel Pownoll (died 1779), master shipwright of Plymouth Dockyard (1762–65) and of Chatham (1775–79), who had built a large number of warships for the Royal Navy. In 1762 Philemon Pownoll had acquired a fortune of £64,963 having captured a Spanish Galleon, and in about 1770 commenced the building of the present house, completed after his death by his daughter and heiress Jane Pownall (died 1822).

=== Bastard ===
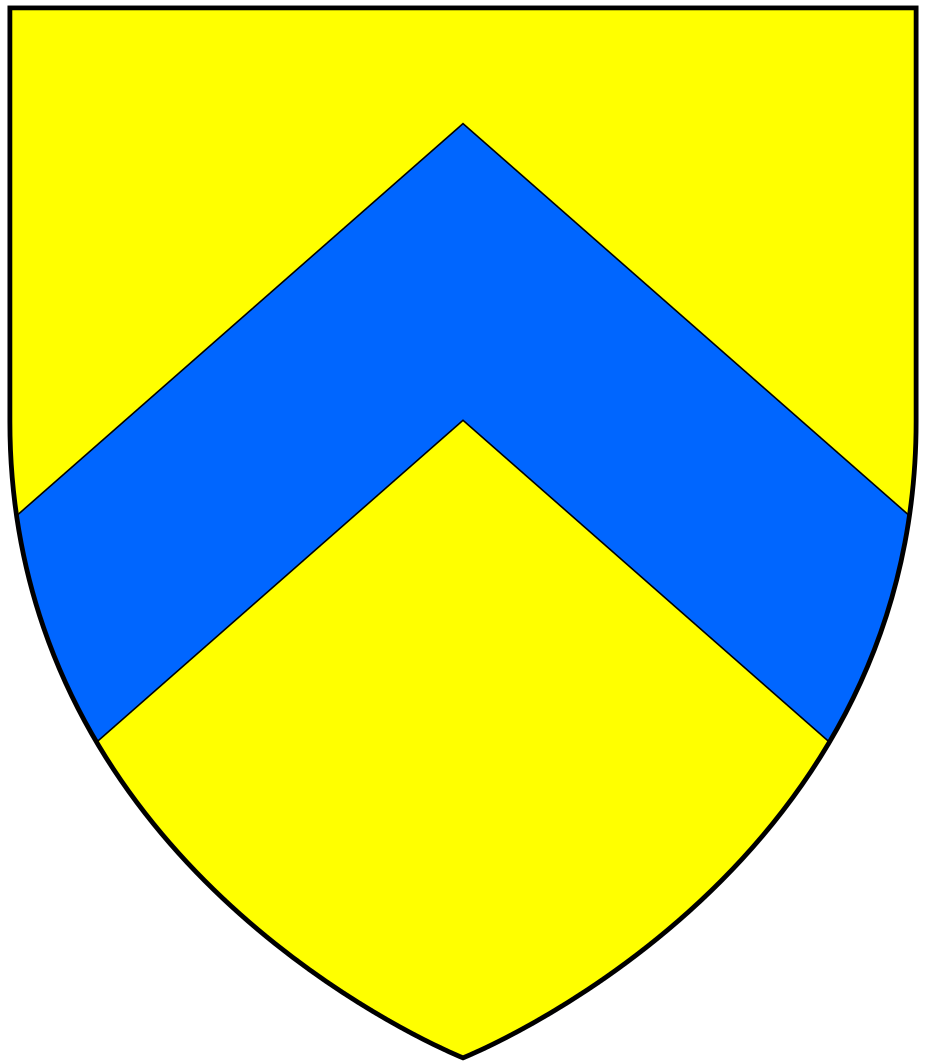
Arms of Bastard: Or, a chevron azure

- Edmund Bastard (1758–1816), of Kitley, Yealmpton, MP for Dartmouth, who married Jane Pownall (died 1822), the heiress of Sharpham.
- Captain John Bastard (1737–1835), Royal Navy, second son, MP for Dartmouth. While Jane's eldest son Edmund Pollexfen Bastard (1784–1838), MP for Devon, inherited Kitley, her second son inherited Sharpham. He is said to have lost his fortune in gambling.

=== Durant ===
Richard Durant purchased Sharpham in 1841, and it remained in the ownership of his descendants until 1940, when the estate was split up and sold, with Avenue Cottage sold separately.

=== Ash ===
In 1962 Sharpham House was purchased by Maurice Ash (1917–2003), whose property developer grandfather, Gilbert Ash, had left him a large fortune. He was an environmentalist, writer, and planner. He was chairman of the Town and Country Planning Association and of the Dartington Trust. After World War II his friend Michael Young, later Lord Young of Dartington, introduced him to the Dartington Hall Trust, a design school with craft workshops, established by Leonard Elmhirst and his wealthy American heiress wife Dorothy Whitney, who in the 1920s had purchased the historic estate of Dartington Hall near Totnes and had restored at great expense the manor house and its mediaeval Great Hall. In 1947 Maurice Ash married Ruth Elmhirst, Leonard and Dorothy's daughter. Maurice and Ruth laid out formal gardens at Sharpham to the design of Percy Cane. In 1982 the Sharpham estate was transferred by Mr Ash to a charitable trust known as the Sharpham Trust, and he continued to reside at Sharpham until his death in 2003.

=== Sharpham Trust ===
Since 1982 Sharpham House has been owned by the Sharpham Trust, a registered educational charity whose aims and objectives are "to maintain, conserve and enhance the land, buildings, resources and bio-diversity of its estate for public benefit. To provide opportunities for physical, intellectual, emotional and spiritual learning; through activity, reflection, creativity and enquiry".

In recent years, the trust has hosted Buddhist-inspired retreats, aiming to develop mental resilience, and help in coping with trauma and grief.

In 2020, the trust began a nature restoration project with a rewilding approach.

== Sources ==
- Risdon, Tristram (died 1640), Survey of Devon, 1811 edition, London, 1811, with 1810 Additions
- Vivian, Lt.Col. J.L., (Ed.) The Visitations of the County of Devon: Comprising the Heralds' Visitations of 1531, 1564 & 1620, Exeter, 1895.
