= Action of 15 June 1780 =

Single-ship action of the American War of Independence

- Part of the American Revolutionary War
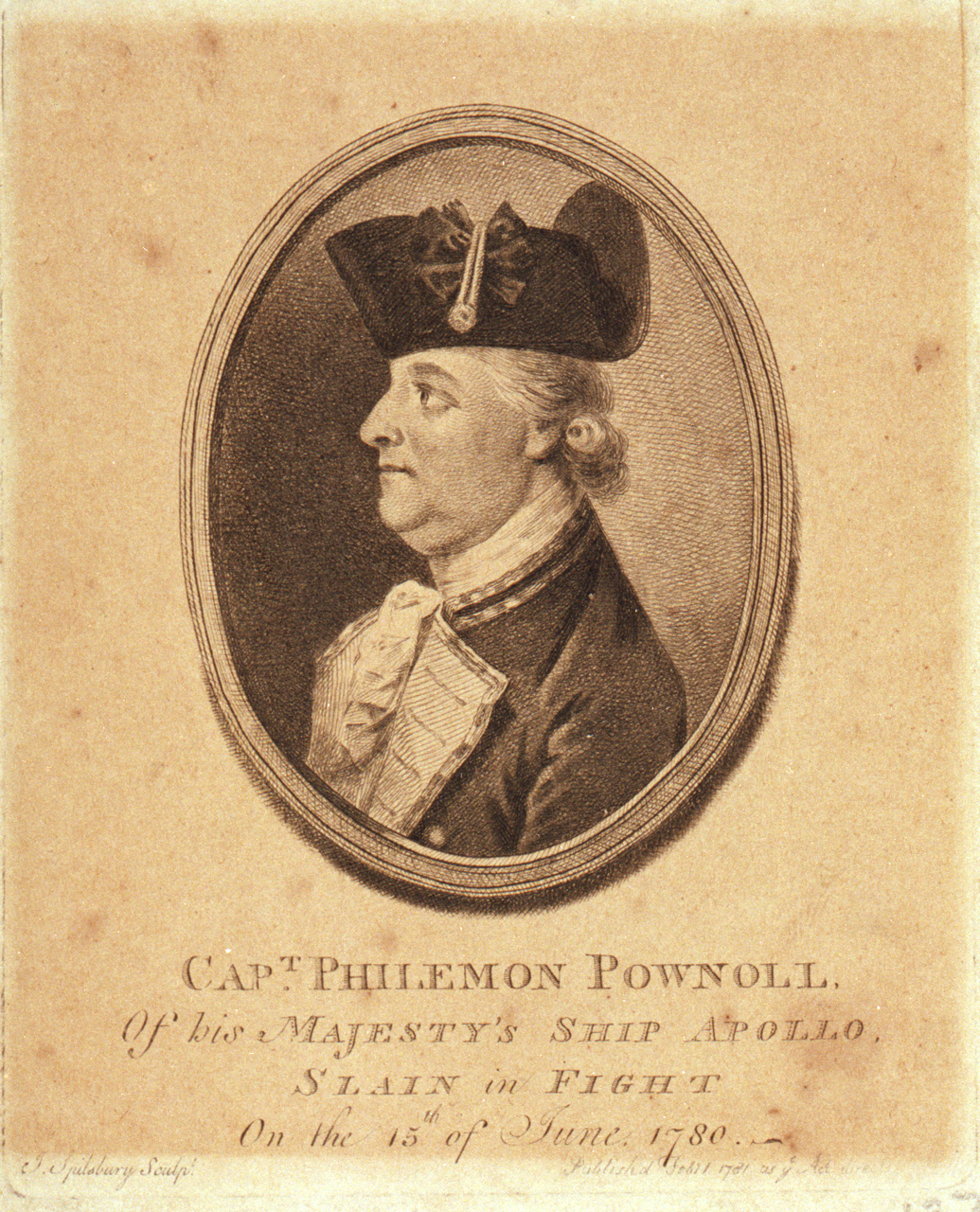
- Portrait of Pownoll made after his death at the action
Date	15 June 1780
Location	Off Ostend, English Channel
Result	British victory

Belligerents
Great Britain	France

Commanders and leaders
Philemon Pownoll †; Edward Pellew	Unknown

Strength
1 frigate	1 privateer frigate

Casualties and losses
5 killed & 20 wounded	1 frigate captured

The action of 15 June 1780 was a minor naval engagement took place during the American War of Independence between a French privateer frigate and a Royal Navy 32-gun fifth-rate HMS Apollo off the coast near Ostend.

In mid June HMS Apollo under the command of Philemon Pownoll was cruising in company with the 32-gun HMS Cleopatra, under Captain the Hon. George Murray. On the 15th a cutter was sighted while cruising in the North Sea and Murray was sent to investigate it. After closing to within gunshot of the cutter by 10.30am, a large sail was observed standing off the land. Whilst Cleopatra was taking the cutter, Apollo went to investigate the large sail. The two ships closed, tacking about to gain the weather gauge, and eventually opened fire. Apollo's opponent was the 26-gun French privateer Stanislaus, and after a period of tacking, the two engaged in broadsides while running for Ostend. After nearly an hour of intense cannonading Pownoll was hit by a cannonball and killed. Lieutenant Edward Pellew who succeeded to the command continued the battle eventually driving the Stanislaus on shore not far from Ostend. Apart from her captain, Apollo lost five men killed and had twenty wounded. A detachment of British marines sent ashore later captured Stanislaus, which was commissioned into the Royal Navy as HMS Proselyte.

On the 18th, Lord Sandwich wrote to Pellew: "I will not delay informing you that I mean to give you immediate promotion as a reward for your gallant and officer-like conduct."
