= Philemon Pownoll =

Royal Navy officer (1734–1780)

Captain Philemon Pownoll
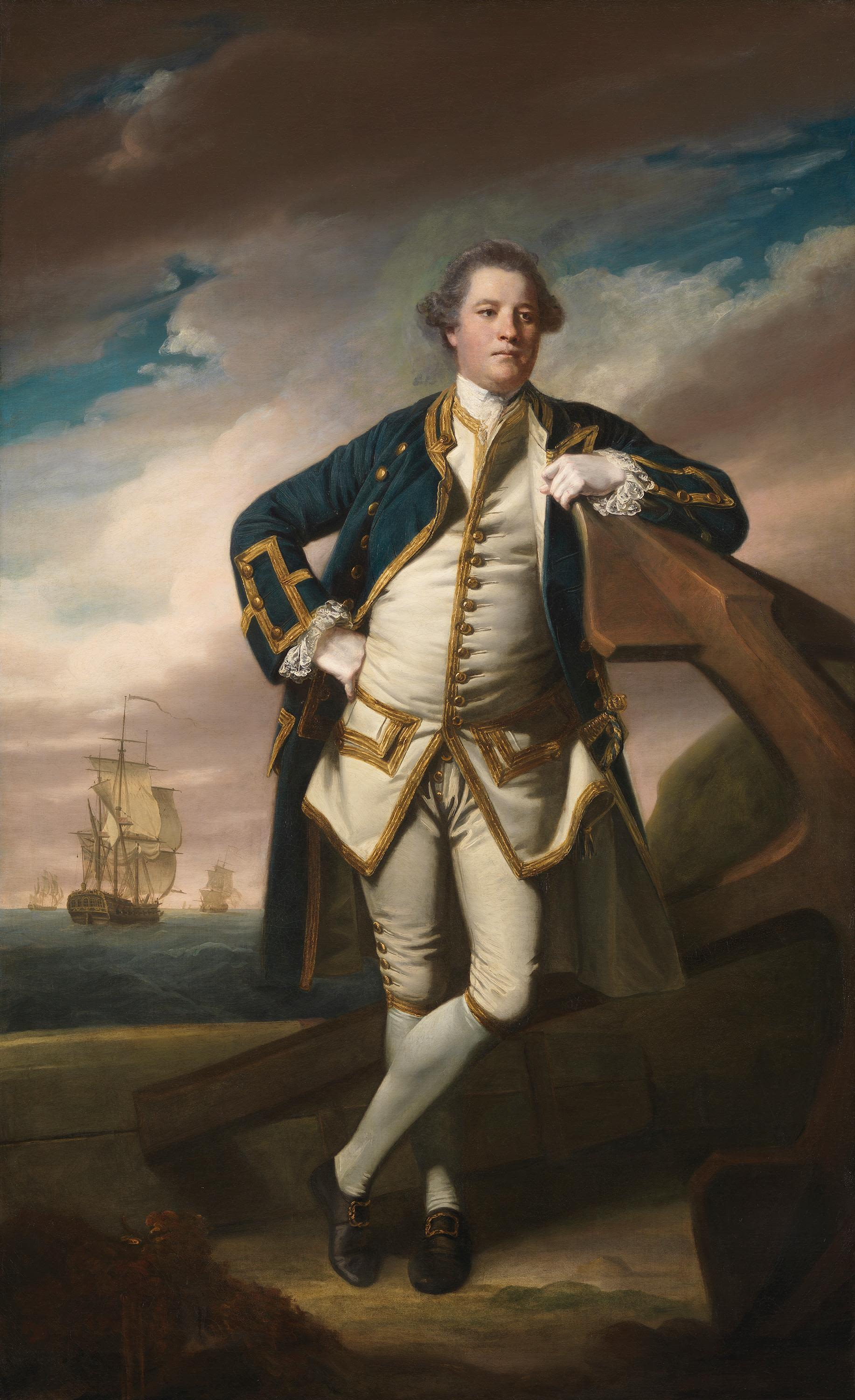
- Portrait by Sir Joshua Reynolds, c. 1769
- Born: c. 1734; Plymouth, England
- Died: 15 June 1780 (aged 45–46); Aboard HMS Apollo, off Ostend
- Relatives: John Bastard (grandson)
- Military career
- Allegiance: Great Britain
- Branch: Royal Navy
- Service years: 1748–1780
- Rank: Captain
- Commands: HMS Favourite; HMS Blonde; HMS Apollo
- Conflicts: War of the Austrian Succession; Seven Years' War; American War of Independence; Relief of Quebec; Action of 31 January 1779; Action of 8 January 1780; Battle of Cape St. Vincent; Relief of Gibraltar

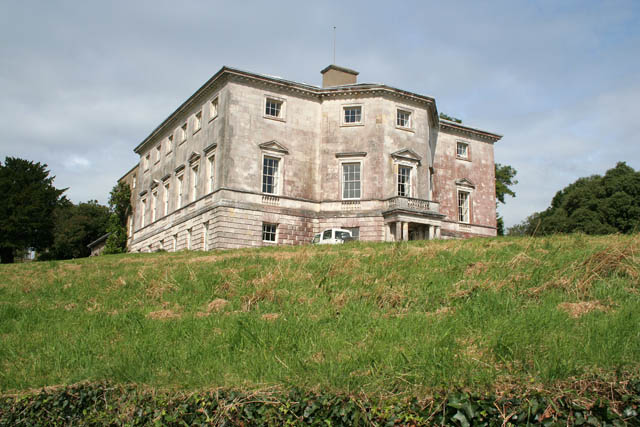
Sharpham House, Ashprington, Devon, commenced in about 1770 by Captain Philemon Pownoll (d.1780), to the designs of the architect Sir Robert Taylor

Captain Philemon Pownoll (c. 1734 – 15 June 1780) was a Royal Navy officer who served in the War of the Austrian Succession, Seven Years' War and American War of Independence.

Born in Plymouth, Pownoll was the son of a leading shipwright. He joined the British navy in the last year of the War of the Austrian Succession. After several years service he rose through the ranks to his own command in time for the outbreak of the Seven Years' War. Commanding a sloop-of-war, he took part in the capture of one of the most valuable prizes taken in the entire conflict, and became immensely wealthy overnight from his success. He married and settled on his estate, but despite his riches, chose to return to active service on the outbreak of the American War of Independence. During his time as a frigate captain he acted as a mentor to future star captains Edward Pellew and John Borlase Warren.

His service in North America was marked with successes in supporting and conveying troops, and engaging in larger fleet actions such as the relief of Gibraltar. He took part in a hard-fought action against a French privateer in 1779, and received a musket ball to the chest, which remained with him for the rest of his life. He again engaged a heavily armed privateer the following year, and this time was killed by a cannonball in the heat of the action, which was brought to a successful conclusion by his first lieutenant. His death was marked with tributes from the leading naval figures of his age, including Admiral John Jervis and Edward Pellew.

== Family and early life ==
Pownoll^{[a]} was born in Plymouth circa 1734, the nephew of master shipwright Israel Pownoll (d.1779), who had built a large number of warships for the Royal Navy over his career. Israel Pownoll served as master shipwright of the dockyard at Plymouth between 1762 and 1765, and of Chatham from 1775 until his death. He owned property in the Shadwell and Clerkenwell areas of London, suggesting that the family descended from the Independent seamen and merchants who were numerous in the Shadwell and Wapping area at the time, and had connections with New England. The naval antiquary Edward Hawke Locker later described Philemon as 'a Gentleman of American extraction'.

Philemon Pownoll entered the navy in about 1748, joining the 64-gun HMS Mars. He passed his lieutenant's examination on 7 April 1755, at which point his age was recorded as 'upwards of twenty', and was promoted to lieutenant on 7 October 1755. He was at first appointed to be second lieutenant of the 60-gun HMS Weymouth, and was later moved to the 100-gun HMS Royal George. Pownoll continued to serve in the Navy with the outbreak of the Seven Years' War, and in 1758 was moved to the 90-gun HMS Namur. Namur was at this time the flagship of Admiral Edward Boscawen, who became Pownoll's patron and rapidly promoted him from fourth to first lieutenant, and then on 6 August 1759 to commander of the sloop HMS Favourite.

== Command ==
Pownoll commanded Favourite for the next two years, and in mid-1761 was sailing as part of a squadron off Cádiz under Captain Charles Proby, consisting of the 74-gun ships HMS Thunderer and HMS Modeste and the 44-gun HMS Thetis. Two French ships, the 64-gun Achille and the frigate Bouffonne escaped the port on 16 July, but were chased down and brought to action the following day by the British squadron. After a fierce fight, both ships were captured. Pownoll was still in command by May 1762, when Favourite was one of the ships sent by Admiral Sir Charles Saunders to guard Cape St Vincent.

On 15 May Favourite was sailing in company with Captain Herbert Sawyer's frigate HMS Active off Cape St Mary, when a Spanish ship was sighted and chased down. Once captured she was found to be the Spanish register ship Hermione, which had sailed from Lima on 6 January bound for Cádiz with a valuable cargo of bags of dollars, gold coin, ingots of gold and silver, cocoa, and blocks of tin. The Hermione was taken into Gibraltar and eventually condemned as a prize, with her contents, hull, and fittings valued at £519,705 10s. 0d., approximately £92.4 million at today's prices. Pownoll and Sawyer each received captain's shares of the prize money of £64,872, approximately £11.5 million at today's prices, amounting to one of the largest individual sums obtained in the period. The ordinary seamen received £480 each, equivalent to thirty years' wages. Coincidentally Sawyer and Pownoll had been courting two sisters, the daughters of a Lisbon merchant, but had been rejected for their lack of funds. Now suddenly extremely wealthy, the two captains married the sisters. Pownoll used his money to buy an estate at Sharpham in the parish of Ashprington in Devon, where he built a large mansion house, surviving today, designed by Robert Taylor, with gardens designed by Capability Brown. It was about this time that he commissioned a portrait from Sir Joshua Reynolds.

== Continued service ==
Despite his immense wealth Pownoll returned to naval service in late 1774, shortly after the outbreak of the American War of Independence. For this he was praised by John Montagu, 4th Earl of Sandwich in the House of Lords. Pownoll was given command of the 32-gun HMS Blonde in December, and prepared her for a voyage to North America. While mustering his crew, a young midshipman was recommended to him by Hugh Boscawen, 2nd Viscount Falmouth, the brother of Pownoll's old patron, Admiral Edward Boscawen. Possibly out of consideration to his debt to the admiral, Pownoll agreed to take him on. The young midshipman was Edward Pellew, who had been turned out of his previous ship, HMS Alarm, after a quarrel with her captain, John Stott, but went on to become one of the great naval commanders of his age. Pownoll and his officers oversaw the fitting out of their ship, which almost ended in disaster when a storm in February 1775 swept Blonde from her moorings at Chatham and nearly wrecked her, the ship being saved by Pownoll's prompt action.

Blonde sailed for North America in April that year, in company with the frigate HMS Juno, and via St Helen's, where they collected a convoy of twenty transports carrying troops under General John Burgoyne. During the voyage Burgoyne was alarmed to see a midshipman on a yardarm balancing on his head. Pownoll reassured him that it was just one of Pellew's antics, and that 'should [he] fall, he would only go under the ship's hull and come up on the other side.' Later in the voyage Pellew jumped overboard to save a man's life, and was reprimanded for his actions by Pownoll, though he later shed tears when talking about it with his fellow officers and called Pellew 'a noble fellow.'

Pellew and Pownoll served at the relief of Quebec. Pownoll returned to North America in April 1776, and was active against American shipping, capturing the privateer Freedom on 16 September 1777, and the privateer True Blue on 27 January 1778. In January 1777 Pownoll was appointed to command the 32-gun HMS Apollo, and brought Pellew with him to his new command.^{[b]} By now a popular figure with his men, Pownoll was able to write to Lord Sandwich that he was '...happily situated in a fine ship & exceedingly well manned with all volunteers except 15 landsmen I received from Admiral Amherst to complete my compliment [sic] not having time to do it myself.'

Apollo served for a time as Lord Howe's flagship from August 1778, and had returned to be refitted and coppered at Plymouth in December that year. Returning to active service in January, on 31 January 1779 she engaged the 26-gun French frigate Oiseau off the Brittany coast in a hard-fought action that left both Pownoll and the French commander wounded.^{[c]} Pownoll was hit in the chest by a musket ball, which remained lodged there for the remainder of his life. Apollo was repaired at Plymouth, and returned to sea later in 1779, joining the fleet under Admiral Sir Charles Hardy. Pownoll captured the 14-gun Mutine on 2 October 1779, and joined Reynolds's squadron later that month. He sailed the following year in support of George Brydges Rodney's mission to relieve Gibraltar, and was present at the attack on the Caracas convoy on 8 January 1780, the Battle of Cape St. Vincent on 16/17 January, and the eventual relief of Gibraltar on 19 January. In the Battle of Cape St. Vincent Pownoll distinguished himself by engaging the Spanish ship of the line Monarca in an unequal engagement for over an hour, compelling the Monarca to strike her colours just as Rodney's flagship arrived on the scene. On 2 March 1780 the privateer Victoire was captured by Apollo, and in mid June Apollo was cruising in company with the 32-gun HMS Cleopatra, under Captain the Hon. George Murray.

== Last fight ==
On 15 June a cutter was sighted while cruising in the North Sea and Murray was sent to investigate it. After closing to within gunshot of the cutter by 10.30am, a large sail was observed standing off the land. The two ships closed, tacking about to gain the weather gauge, and eventually opening fire. Apollo's opponent was the 26-gun French privateer Stanislaus, and after a period of tacking, the two engaged in broadsides while running for Ostend. After nearly an hour of intense cannonading Pownoll was hit by a cannon ball and killed. Command of Apollo devolved to Pellew as the first lieutenant, who continued the fight, eventually driving the Stanislaus on shore. Apart from her captain, Apollo lost five men killed and had twenty wounded. The Stanislaus was later recovered and brought into the navy as HMS Proselyte.

== Legacy ==
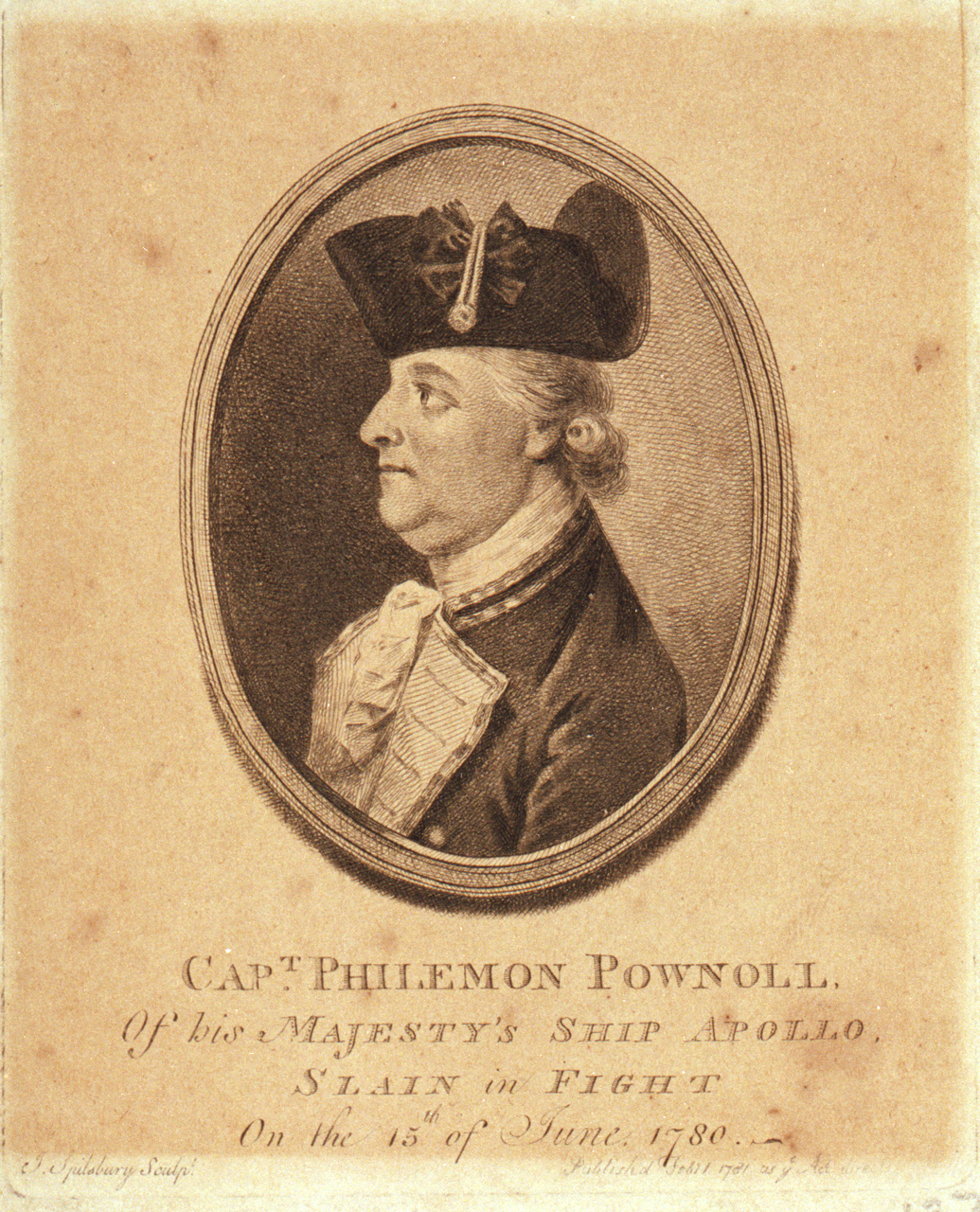
1781 portrait of Pownoll

Pownoll's death was widely mourned, Pellew writing in his report to the British Admiralty that: 'The loss of Captain Pownoll will be severely felt. The ship's company have lost a father. I have lost much more, a father and a friend united; and that friend my only one on earth. Never, my lord, was grief more poignant than that we all feel for an adored commander. Mine is inexpressible.' Admiral John Jervis wrote of him that he was 'the best officer, & most excellent, kind hearted man in the Profession', and claimed that he had 'lost the best Partizan, if not the best officer under every line of description in the Service'.

Edward Osler wrote in 1835 that 'St Vincent and Pownoll who were brought up under Boscawen, and received their Lieutenant's commission from him, contributed materially to form a Nelson or an Exmouth; each the founder of a school of officers, whose model is the character of their chief, and their example his successes.' As well as Pellew, John Borlase Warren served under Pownoll and went on to become a leading frigate captain, while Jervis remembered Pownoll's contribution to the navy in 1804, when he promoted Pownoll's grandson, John Bastard. Pellew named his eldest son Pownoll Bastard Pellew in honour of his former captain and his family.

== Notes ==
a. Variants of the surname include Pownall and Pownell. The Oxford Dictionary of National Biography uses 'Pownoll'.

b. Apollo had been launched in 1763 as HMS Glory, but had been renamed in 1774.

c. The captured Oiseau was brought into the navy as HMS Oiseau.
