= Robert French (English MP) =

English politician

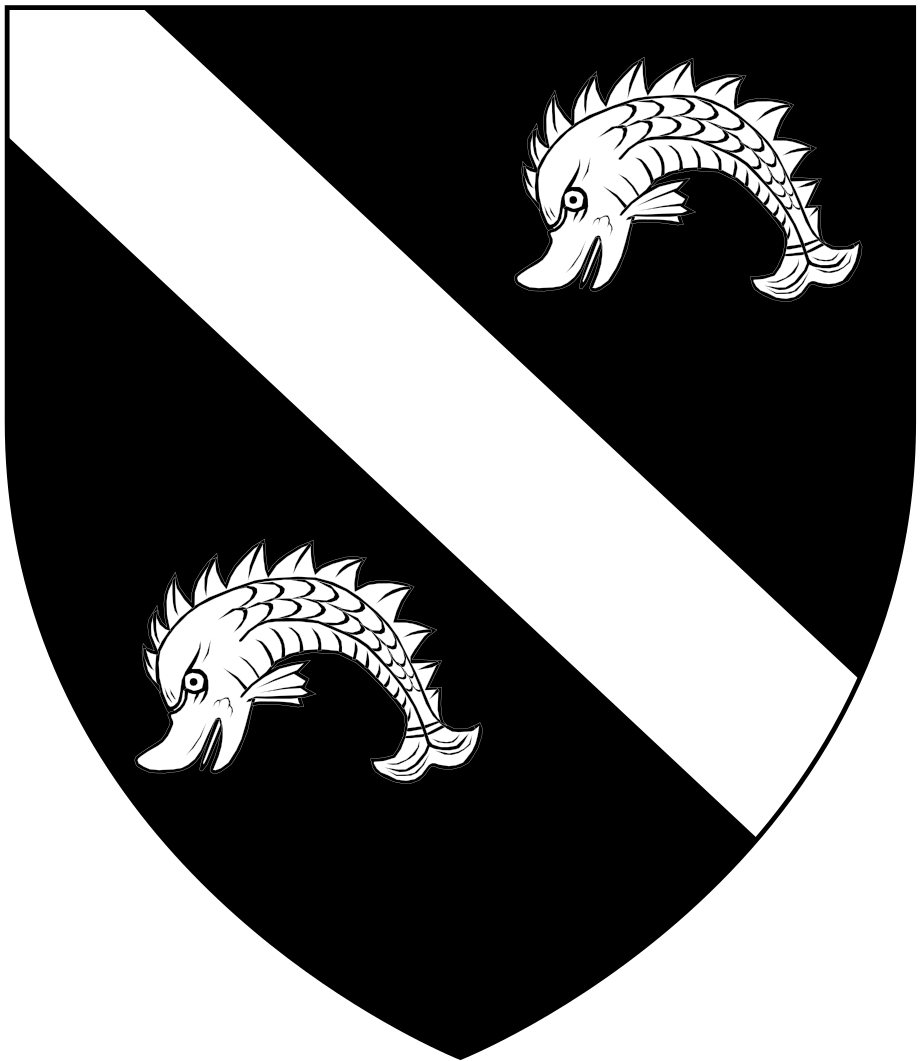
Arms of French: Sable, a bend between two dolphins hauriant argent

Robert French (fl. 1377–1386) of Totnes, Devon was an English politician.

He was a Member (MP) of the Parliament of England for Totnes in January 1377, November 1384, 1385 and 1386. He married Anne Winard, daughter and heiress of Robert Winard of Sharpham in the parish of Ashprington in Devon.
