= Harbourne River =

River in Devon, England

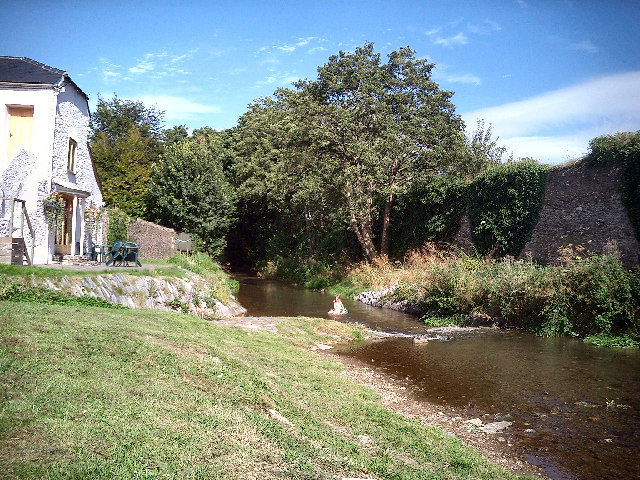
- Harbourne River at Harbertonford

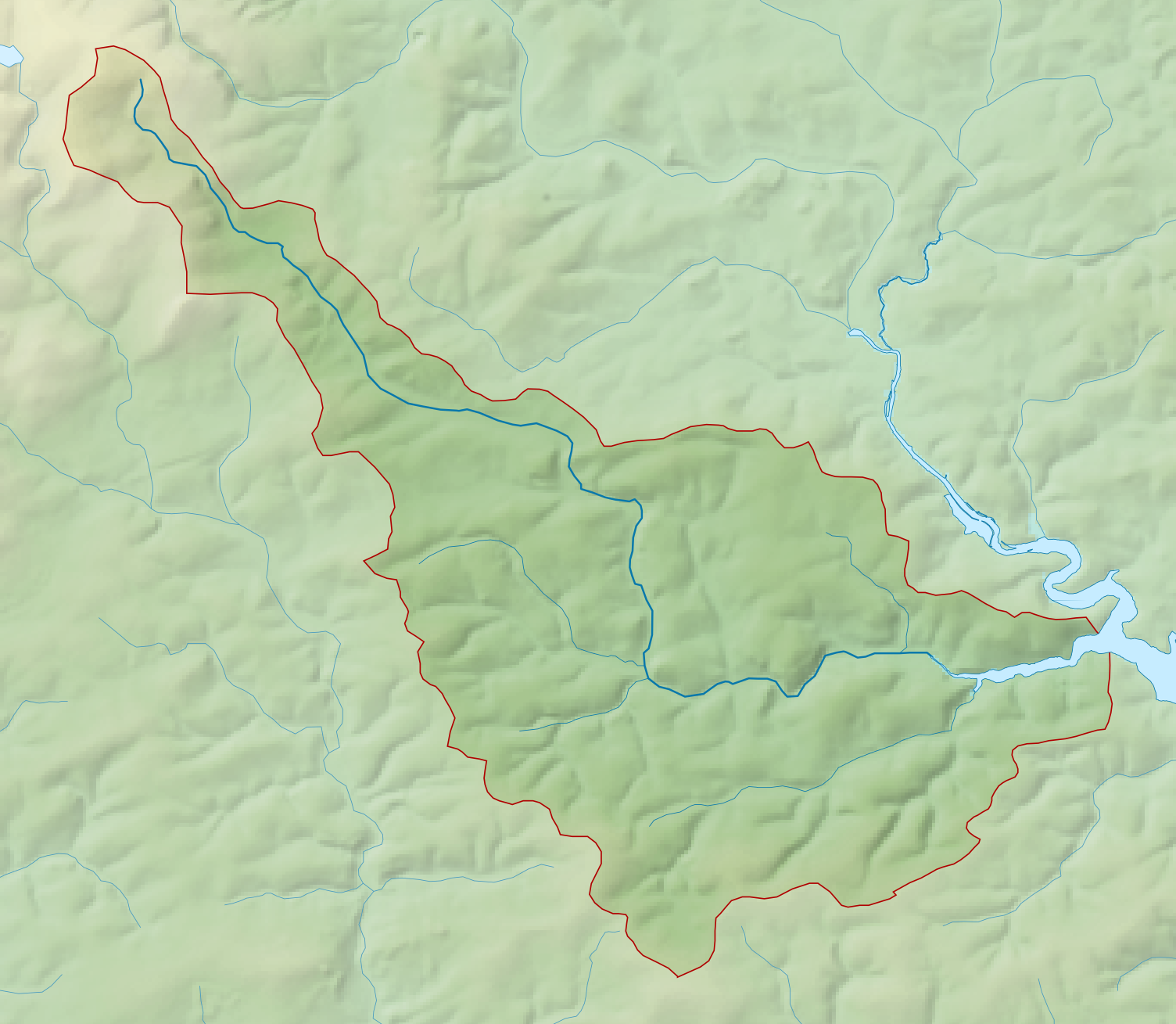
- Map of the Harbourne River catchment

Location
- Country: England
- County: Devon

Physical characteristics
- Source: Harbourne Head
  - coordinates: 50.4714°N 3.8397°W
- Mouth
  - location: Bow
  - coordinates: 50.5971°N 3.672°W
- Length: 20 km (12 mi)

The Harbourne River is a river in Devon in England. Its estuary is known as Bow Creek, and flows into the River Dart near Stoke Gabriel.

The river rises on the slopes of Gripper's Hill on Dean Moor on Dartmoor. From the source it flows generally south east, under the A38 road, to the village of Harberton. There it turns south, then east through Harbertonford to the hamlet of Bow near Ashprington. Below Bow the river is tidal, and becomes Bow Creek. Two miles below Bow, the estuary joins the Dart. The hamlet of Tuckenhay lies on the south bank of Bow Creek.

There was a history of milling on the river. From the late 18th century there was a woollen mill at Harbertonford, fed by a leat from a weir upstream of the village. Until flood defence works were completed in 2002, the river caused periodic flooding at Harbertonford.

The river gives its name to Harbourne Blue, a goat's cheese made near Ashprington.
