= Richard Gipps =

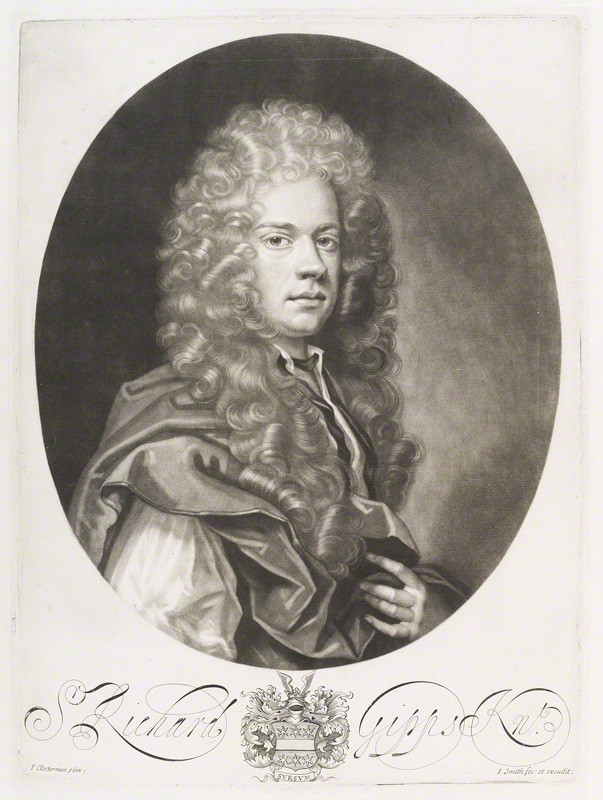
Sir Richard Gipps by John Smith, after John Closterman

Sir Richard Gipps (1659 – 21 December 1708) of Great Whelnetham, Suffolk, was Master of the Revels at Gray's Inn and a historian of the county of Suffolk. His portrait painted by John Closterman, was engraved in mezzotint by John Smith. Care should be taken to distinguish him from Sir Richard Gipps of Horningsheth, a contemporary, neighbour, and distant relative, who was knighted by Charles II at Saxham, Suffolk, on 20 October 1676.

== Origins ==
Gipps was the second son of John Gipps (c.1620–1707) of Great Whelnetham, Suffolk, by his wife Mary Davidson (d. 1665), daughter of David Davidson, alderman of London, and was baptised at Great Whelnetham on 15 September 1659.

== Career ==
He spent seven years at Bury Grammar School and proceeded to Gonville and Caius College, Cambridge. He was admitted a student of Gray's Inn 5 February 1675–6; the only other record of his membership of that society previous to 1682 is a decree of censure on him for a breach of authority. On 3 November 1682 Gipps assumed the office of Master of the Revels to the society. These continued every Saturday for two terms, and were patronized by royalty. On 27 November that year Gipps was knighted by King Charles II at Whitehall. On 23 January 1682–3 he went in great state to Whitehall to invite the king, queen, and court to a masque held on the following Candlemas Day (2 February) at Gray's Inn, which was performed with great splendour.

Subsequently Gipps appears to have retired to his seat in Suffolk, and devoted himself to antiquarian pursuits and the history of his native county. His manuscript collections for this purpose are in the British Museum and the Bodleian Library, Oxford. Sir John Cullum, 6th Baronet transcribed Gipps's Collections for the History of the Suffolk Gentry, and made considerable additions. This manuscript is in the possession of G. Milner-Gibson-Cullum, F.S.A., at Hardwick, Bury St Edmunds, who also owns the original copper-plate of the admission ticket to the aforesaid masque. Besides Great Whelnetham Gipps inherited property at Brockley and Rede Hall in Suffolk, which he sold.

== Marriage and children ==
He married Mary Giles, daughter and heiress of Edward Giles of Bowden House, Ashprington, Devonshire, with whom he obtained the large Bowden estate, which he sold, and by whom he had three sons and a daughter.

== Death and burial ==
He died on 21 December 1708 and was buried at Great Whelnetham.
