= Maurice Ash =

Environmentalist, writer and planner (1917–2003)

Chairman of the Dartington Trust
- In office 1972–1984
- Preceded by: Leonard Knight Elmhirst

Chairman of the Town and Country Planning Association
- In office 1969–1987

Chairman of the Green Alliance
- In office 1978–1983

Personal details
- Born: 31 October 1917 Hazaribagh, India
- Died: 27 January 2003 (aged 85)
- Education: London School of Economics; Yale University
- Occupation: Writer, farmer, planner

Military service
- Allegiance: United Kingdom
- Branch/service: British Army
- Years of service: 1939–45
- Rank: Captain
- Unit: 23rd Armoured Brigade

Maurice Anthony Ash (31 October 1917 – 27 January 2003) was a British environmentalist, writer, farmer, and planner. He was chairman of the Town and Country Planning Association and of the Dartington Trust and founder/chairman of mindfulness & nature charity The Sharpham Trust.

== Education and early life ==
Maurice Anthony Ash was born at Hazaribagh, India on 31 October 1917. His father, Wilfrid Cracroft Ash, was a successful civil engineer in British India who also made a large engineering contribution to the 1939–1945 War. His father, Wilfrid Cracroft Ash, was the founder of the construction company Gilbert-Ash; Maurice was noted for technological inventions in pre-stressed concrete. The mathematician and brewer, Michael Ash, was his brother.

Ash was educated at Gresham's School, Holt, Norfolk, the London School of Economics (where he read economics), and at Yale. At LSE, he met Michael Young, later Lord Young of Dartington, who became a lifelong friend. During his education he developed a lifelong dislike for pseudoscience.

== Career ==
During the Second World War, Ash served in the British 23rd Armoured Brigade in North Africa, Italy and Greece. In 1944, he was mentioned in dispatches. He later wrote a history of his regiment.

=== Dartington Hall ===
After the war, Young introduced him to the Dartington Hall Trust. The rundown 1,000 acre (4 km^{2}) estate of Dartington, near Totnes in Devon, had been bought by Leonard and Dorothy Elmhirst in the 1920s. With ideas from the philosopher Rabindranath Tagore and money Dorothy Elmhirst inherited from her family (the American Whitneys) the Elmhirsts rescued a medieval hall and developed the estate, creating craft workshops and founding a famous design school.

After farming in Essex, Ash was interested in the postwar plans for new towns such as Welwyn Garden City and joined the Town and Country Planning Association (TCPA), becoming its chairman and later its vice-president. The TCPA published the influential magazine Bulletin of Environmental Education. Ash promoted enlightened development. Before leaving Essex for Devon, Ash founded the Harlow art trust.

Ash became chairman of the Dartington Trust in 1972. While some Dartington activities were given up, others started. Dartington glass and the Schumacher College continued. Ash also backed a magazine called The Vole.

In writing about the great private estates which followed the dissolution of the English monasteries, Ash argued that they had been failures in any civilizing sense. Monasteries had been centres of learning and innovation. He argued for re-establishing such communities. Broadly, his philosophy followed Wittgenstein and rejected Descartes.

=== Sharpham Estate & The Sharpham Trust ===
Maurice & his wife Ruth bought The Sharpham Estate, at Ashprington near Totnes in Devon in 1962, and moved there with their young family.

They set about developing the Sharpham Estate as a rural community and adding value to farming products by turning the Jersey cows’ milk into cheese, as well as planting a vineyard and making the grapes into quality English wine.

In 1982, Ruth and Maurice founded The Sharpham Trust as a charity, which had as its basis a marrying of Eastern and Western philosophy. Maurice was much influenced by Wittgenstein and Buddhism.

The Sharpham Trust was tasked with caring for Sharpham House and Estate and taking forward Maurice and Ruth’s passions including the arts, Buddhism, conservation and rural regeneration.

The Trust continues today, offering mindfulness retreats, courses & events, whilst rewilding the Sharpham Estate, which is now designated as organic.

== Books ==
His published books include:

- Regions of Tomorrow: Towards the Open City (1969) ISBN 0-238-78935-7
- A Guide to the Structure of London (1972)
- New Renaissance: Essays in Search of Wholeness (Green Books, 1986) ISBN 1-870098-00-5
- Journey into the Eye of a Needle (1991) ISBN 1-870098-35-8
- The Fabric of the World: Towards a Philosophy of Environment (Green Books, 1992) ISBN 1-870098-42-0
- Sharpham Miscellany: Essays in Spirituality and Ecology by John Crook, Maurice Ash, and Stephen Batchelor (1992) ISBN 0-9518298-0-7
- Beyond the Age of Metaphysics: and the Restoration of Local Life (Green Books, 1998)
- Where Division Ends: On Feeling at Home in Chaos (Green Books, Totnes, 2001) ISBN 1-903998-06-9

== Personal life ==
Ash met the Elmhirsts' daughter Ruth and in 1947, they were married. They had a son and three daughters.

In 1962, the Ashes bought Sharpham House, Ashprington, near Totnes, in Devon, a large Palladian house designed by Robert Taylor. A 100-acre (400,000 m^{2}) farm there was run on Rudolf Steiner principles, and also vineyards, a Buddhist community and college, and the Robert Owen Foundation, a charity which provided agricultural experience for people with mental disabilities.

== Sources ==
- Boston, Richard (13 February 2003). "Obituary: Maurice Ash". The Guardian.
- The Independent (28 January 2003). "Obituaries: Maurice Ash". The Independent. Archived from the original on 12 May 2022.
- Times (6 February 2003). "Maurice Ash". The Times.
- "Ash, Maurice". Who's Who.
