= Michael Edward Ash =

British mathematician and brewer (1927–2016)

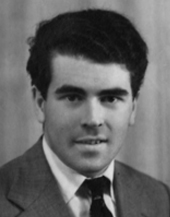
- Ash in 1953
- Born: 17 December 1927; Calcutta, West Bengal, India
- Died: 30 April 2016 (aged 88)
- Known for: Draught Guinness; Nitro-beer
- Spouses: Dulcie Joan Orme; Gillian Issobel Little

Michael Edward Ash (17 December 1927 – 30 April 2016) was a British mathematician and brewer. Ash led a team that invented a nitrogenated dispense system for Guinness stout first released in 1959, which evolved to become the beer now sold globally as Draught Guinness. As the manager in charge of the Easy Serve project, Ash is credited as the inventor of nitrogenated beer (sometimes known as "nitro beer" colloquially). He was Managing Director of Crookes Laboratories (1962–1972) where he was responsible for securing the license for an early anti-depressant in the UK, Prothiaden.

== Education and early life ==
Born in Calcutta, India to civil engineer father, Wilfrid Cracroft Ash and mother Maud (née Harper), Ash had a brother, environmentalist Maurice, and a sister, Marjorie.Ash attended two prep schools in the UK, The old Ride School and then Yarlet Hall. He then went on to Canford School, Wimborne, Dorset, and was further educated at Trinity College, Cambridge from 1945–1948. At Trinity, he read mathematics, received a first in the Mathematical Tripos, won the Rouse Ball prize, and the Senior Wrangler Title for 1948.

== Career ==
Following graduation from Cambridge, Ash lectured in mathematics at The Bedford College for women for three years before joining Guinness & Co. as a mathematician at their London Brewery in Park Royal in January 1951. Ash was the first non-brewer to join Guinness.

After training as a brewer, by 1954 Ash also had experience of running two departments (Brewing and Forwarding) and in 1955 he was given his own department the 'Sample Room', which had facilities for experimentation, and a team of 20 men. The 'Draught problem' was given to Ash as part of his briefing from the managing Director, Hugh Beaver; Ash assigned two men from his Sample Room team to help. At the time, Guinness used a convoluted draught system in which highly conditioned beer was blended with aged, nearly still beer. It was a slow, arduous process that limited the ability of draught dispense to reach a more global market.

Guinness had for years been looking for a system in which a bartender with no special training could pour a glass of draught beer in a matter of seconds to settle quickly with a head (3/8" in a normal ½ pint glass). Ash realized that the solution lay in the use of a blend of nitrogen and carbon dioxide (as opposed to only the latter), but it took him four years to devise a mechanism to dispense nitrogenated beer. Inside Guinness, Ash’s quest to produce a 'Draught Guinness' was regarded as quixotic, and other brewers chided it as "Daft Guinness". Eventually, working with keg designer, Eric Lewis, Ash developed a self-contained two-part keg (initially known as the 'Ash Can'), with one chamber full of beer and the other full of mixed gas under pressure, and the introduction of nitrogen. Finally, after being redesigned, the new keg was released to pubs in 1959, the 200th anniversary of Guinness. Ash, and his team, asked Hugh Beaver, the managing director, how large the head should be, but he didn't know, so they had to decide themselves. Speaking at Guinness in March 2016, Ash said:

“…We had to decide ourselves that the perfect head was three eighths of an inch…it just looked right.”

Nitrogen is less soluble than carbon dioxide, which allows the beer to be put under high pressure without making it fizzy. The high pressure of dissolved gas is required to enable very small bubbles to be formed by forcing the draught beer through fine holes in a plate in the tap, which causes the characteristic 'surge'.

Ultimately called the "easy serve system," in late 1959 it began to replace the old "high and low" taps used in Ireland, before spreading to Great Britain and beyond beginning in the 1960s. At a board meeting on 9 December 1959, Benjamin Guinness (then Viscount Elveden) reported that:

"...about half the draught Guinness outlets have now been changed to the Easy Serve system, and the changeover of the remainder should take place by mid-January 1960."

The invention, which made for a smoother, less characterful beer, was not without controversy, and for years a minority of Irish drinkers complained about the change. Eventually, nitrogenated stout became a standard, not just at Guinness but among all Irish makers of stout.

Ash left the brewing side of Guinness in 1962 to become managing director of Crookes Laboratories in Park Royal (owned by Guinness). Crookes moved to Basingstoke in 1965. At Crookes, Ash was responsible for acquiring the licence for the anti-depressant Prothiaden (Dosulepin) in 1967. From 1970 onwards Ash followed various interests including business education and was a founding governor of Templeton College Oxford.

== Personal life ==
Ash met his first wife, Dulcie Joan Orme (Canadian) in 1950 at a party in Hampstead, London; in May 1951 they married in London. They had four children: Lionel Michael (died as an infant), Lucinda (Lucy), Frances, and (Michael) Edward. In 1975 Ash divorced and married his second wife Gillian Issobel Little; she died in 2007. He lived the last part of his life in Painscastle, in Powys, Wales, and died on April 30, 2016.

== Publications ==
His publications include –

- The journal of institute of brewing, continuous brewing 1961
- Information Science 1500–1850
- Invention Innovation and Mathematics

== Bibliography ==
- 'Believe' Six turning points for Guinness that hinged on inner strength, by John Simmons and Mark Griffiths
- Guinness: The 250 Year Quest for the Perfect Pint by Bill Yenne
- Beer: The Ultimate World Tour by Bill Yenne
- Twenty-six Ways of Looking at a Blackberry: by John Simmons
- The Search for God and Guinness: A Biography of the Beer that Changed the World by Stephen Mansfield
- The SAGE Encyclopedia of Alcohol: Social, Cultural, and Historical Perspectives by Scott C. (Christopher) Martin
- Making Guinness Guinness – Michael Ash Trinity College Cambridge: The Fountain, Issue 23
