= Bowden, Ashprington =

Historic estate in Devon, England

Bowden House
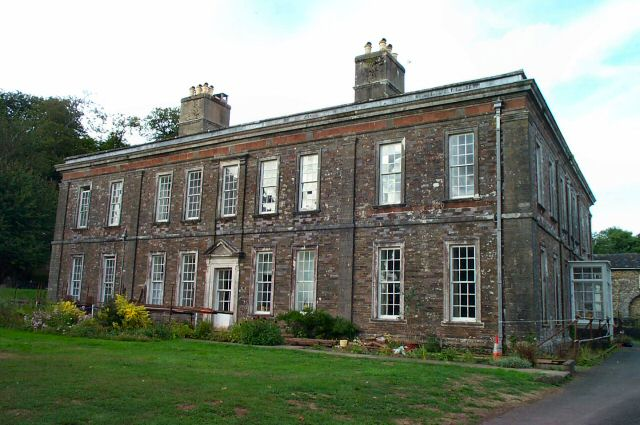
- Bowden House

- Location within Devon
- 50°25′02″N 3°41′18″W
- Type: Manor house
- Location: Ashprington

Site notes
- Area: Devon
- Architectural styles: Tudor and Georgian architecture
- Owner: The Bowden Housing Cooperative Ltd

Listed Building – Grade I
- Official name: Bowden House
- Designated: 7 January 1952
- Reference no.: 1236034

Bowden is an historic estate in Ashprington parish near Totnes in Devon, England. The present structure, known as "Bowden House", is a grade I listed building and is built in a range of styles, mainly English Baroque and Tudor, reflecting the range of periods it was built and edited over.

== History ==
Bowden was occupied by the de Braose family in 1154 but there remains no visible evidence of this period, followed by the Bowden family, including Sir John Bowden who likely named the building. The core of the current building likely originated from construction done for Thomas Giles (or Gyles, or Gylles) who acquired Bowden in 1464. About one third of a large Tudor mansion built for his grandson, John Gyles, in the beginning of the 16th century remains and was incorporated into the current building. Evidence of the original layout of Thomas Giles's construction is found in the existing cellar walls and the southern outer courtyard walls. The Giles Family lived at Bowden for about 250 years.

Shortly after purchasing the house in 1704, Nicholas Trist enlarged it by adding ranges to cover two sides of the original building. However, he likely retained part of a north cross wing and the Tudor hall. In the 18th century, the hall became the main kitchen, with ovens and a massive chimney being added to the west side.

In about 1800 Bowden was bought by the Adams family, who owned it until 1887. Their main contribution were the layout of the roofs of the current building. The ceiling in the 18th century south entrance hall carries a shield of arms of 'Adams of Bowden'. Sir Nikolaus Pevsner comments that it is "one of the few examples in the country of an essay in Baroque taste, the details rather better than the sum of the parts, as seen so often in provincial work. An early C18 date seems likely for most of the decoration, although some of the embellishments may be later, among them the arms of the Adam family, owners of the house from c. 1800, which appear on the ceiling.'

== Architecture ==
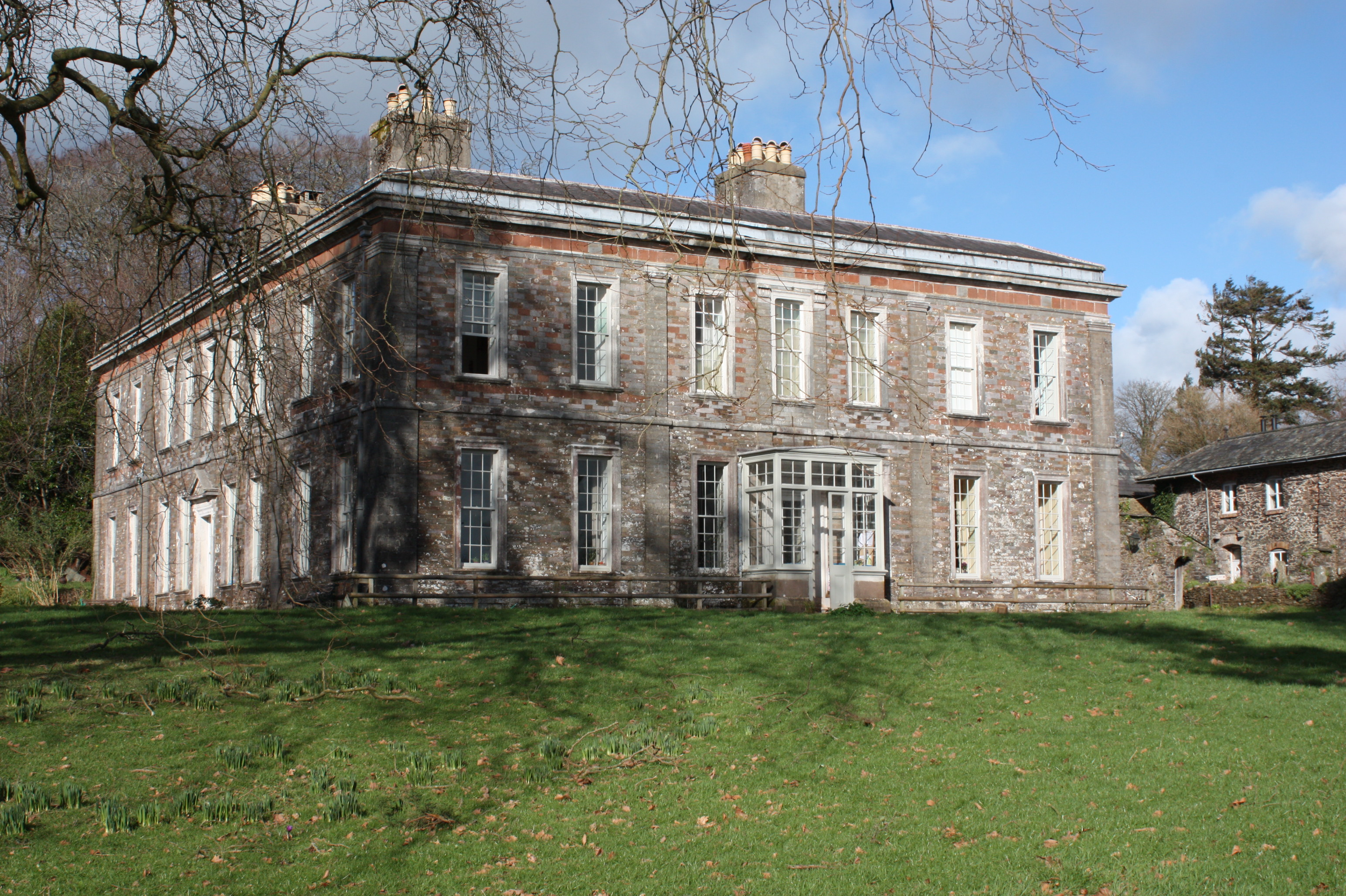
Bowden House as viewed from the South

Bowden House was begun as a manor house of c.1509, of which a range to the rear and several chimney stacks remain. It was remodelled with new south-east and south-west fronts c.1700-04 for Nicholas Trist. It has later alterations such as an early 19th century glazed porch and stable block, which is attached to the remaining 16th century range. Outbuildings incorporate fragments of the 16th century house.

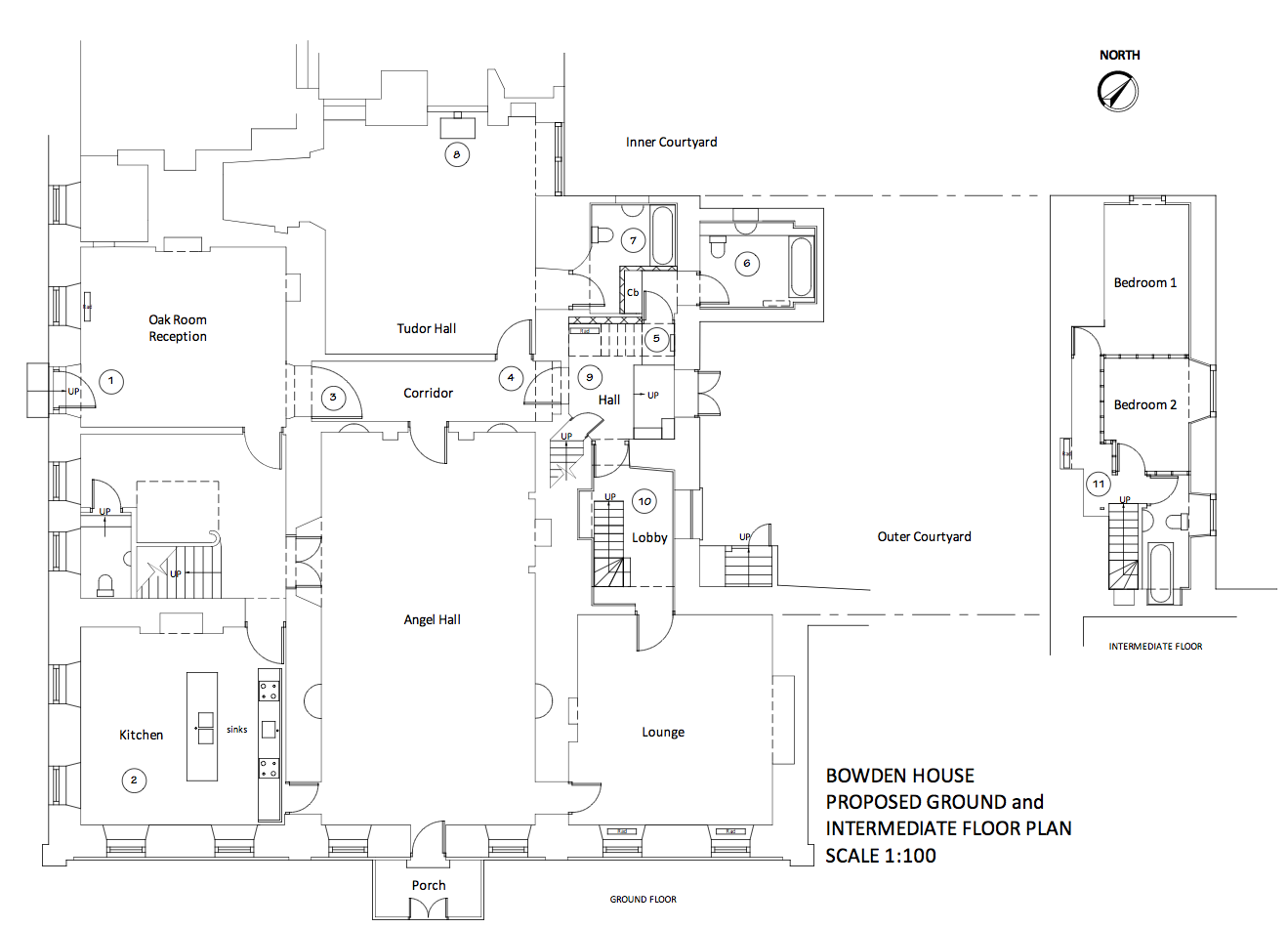
Ground floor plan of Bowden House

Its interior contains its former Tudor hall, later converted to a kitchen, which retains a moulded plaster ceiling decorated with rib work and part of a figured frieze. There are open fireplaces, one with early 18th century mantle. In the 18th century front room there is earlier 17th century panelling, believed to be brought from elsewhere in the old house and a fine carved chimneypiece with elaborate coat of arms and crowned supporters inscribed below Holophernes and Judith with the date 1585. In the entrance hall there is elaborate 18th century plasterwork, with a medallion of Charles I dated 1735. There is a mid 18th century open staircase.

== Ownership ==
John Giles (or Gyles, or Gylles) MP (c.1487-1553) to son

William Giles (c.1507-1581) to son

John Giles MP (d. 1606) to son

Sir Edward Giles MP (1566-1637) to first cousin

Richard Giles (1581-1648) to son

John Giles (died 1676) to kinswoman

Mary, wife of Sir Richard Gipps, who sold 1704 to

Nicholas Trist (1668-1741) to son

Browse Trist (c.1699-1777) to son

Hore Browse Trist (c.1736-80) to brother

Rev. Browse Trist (c.1742-91) to three daughters, who sold c.1800 to

William Adams MP (1752-1811) to son

William Dacres Adams (1775-1862) to son

Rev. Dacres Adams (1806-71) to son

William Fulford Adams (1833-1912) who sold 1887 to

Sir Mortimer Singer (died 1929) who sold 1895 to
The Harvey family who sold c.1914 to
Montague Bush who sold to
Robert William Campbell-Davidson (fl. 1923) ca. 1920 let to

Col. Partridge, requisitioned for use by US Army in WW2, used as special school, then sold c. 1965 to

Ayles family, who sold in 1976 to
Christopher & Belinda Petersen, who sold in 2000 to
Mrs. & Mr. R. Taylor, who sold in 2005 to
Jan Mosbacher, who sold in 2014 to
The Bowden Housing Cooperative Ltd.

The Bowden House Community, who are the present owners and residents of the building, are a cohousing "group of families and individuals developing conscious, authentic and eco-mindful living within a culture of singing, working, eating, gardening, celebrating and learning together". Bowden House is owned by the Bowden Housing Cooperative Ltd., which is in turn the joint property of its residents.

== Sources ==
- Burke, John, Genealogical and Heraldic History of the Commoners of Great Britain and Ireland Enjoying Territorial Possessions or High Official Rank but Uninvested with Heritable Honours, 4 volumes (1833–1838), Vol. 4, ("Small Paper Edition"), London, 1838, pp. 434–4, Adams of Bowden
- Pevsner, Nikolaus & Cherry, Bridget, The Buildings of England: Devon, London, 2004, pp. 195–6, Bowden House
- Pole, Sir William (died 1635), Collections Towards a Description of the County of Devon, Sir John-William de la Pole (ed.), London, 1791, p. 293, Bowedon
- Risdon, Tristram (died 1640), Survey of Devon, 1811 edition, London, 1811, with 1810 Additions, p. 166, Bowden, Ashprington
- Vivian, Lt.Col. J.L., (Ed.) The Visitations of the County of Devon: Comprising the Heralds' Visitations of 1531, 1564 & 1620, Exeter, 1895, p. 409, pedigree of Giles of Bowden
