= Tuckenhay =

Hamlet in Devon, England

Coordinates: 50.393°N 03.664°W

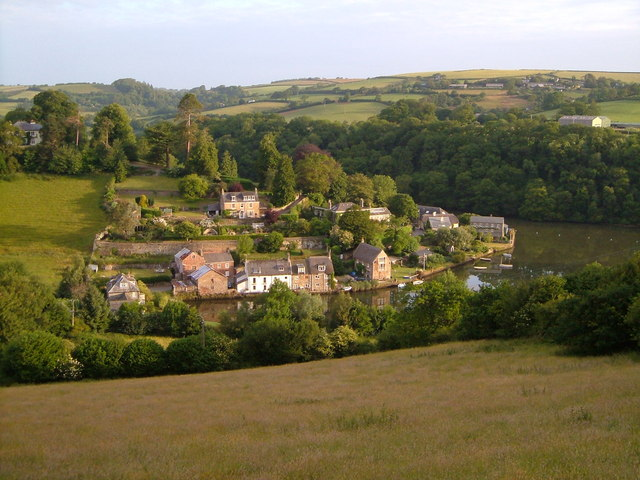
- Tuckenhay from the east

- Location within Devon
- OS grid reference: SX818562
- Civil parish: Ashprington
- District: South Hams
- Shire county: Devon
- Region: South West
- Country: England
- Sovereign state: United Kingdom
- Post town: TOTNES
- Postcode district: TQ9
- Dialling code: 01803
- Police: Devon and Cornwall
- Fire: Devon and Somerset
- Ambulance: South Western

Tuckenhay is a hamlet in the South Hams in Devon, England, 2.5 miles (4.0 km) south of Totnes. It lies on the south bank of Bow Creek, the estuary of the Harbourne River, which flows into the River Dart.

The name is first recorded only from 1550, and possibly means "at the oak enclosure" (Middle English atte oken hay).

The village has an industrial past. A paper mill opened in 1829, and produced high quality hand-made paper until the late 20th century. An extension was opened in 1889, and has now been converted into holiday accommodation. Nearby on the quay is a restaurant-pub, the Maltsters Arms, once owned by the TV chef Keith Floyd.
