= Keith Floyd =

English cook and television personality (1943–2009)

- Floyd in 2003
- Born: 28 December 1943; Sulhamstead, Berkshire, England
- Died: 14 September 2009 (aged 65); Dorchester, Dorset, England
- Occupations: Celebrity chef; television personality; businessman; restaurateur; author
- Years active: 1984–2009
- Spouse(s): Jesmond Ruttledge (divorced); Julie Hatcher (divorced) Shaunagh Mullett (m. 1991; div. 1994) Teresa Smith (m. 1995; div. 2008)
- Partner: Celia Martin (until 2009, his death)
- Children: 2

Keith Floyd (28 December 1943 – 14 September 2009) was an English celebrity cook, restaurateur, television personality and "gastronaut" who hosted cooking shows for the BBC and published many books combining cookery and travel. On television, his eccentric style of presentation – usually drinking wine as he cooked and talking to his crew – endeared him to millions of viewers worldwide.

== Early life ==
Floyd was born at Folly Farm, Sulhamstead, near Reading, Berkshire, on 28 December 1943 to Sydney Albert Floyd (1915–1985) and Winifred Phyllis Lorraine, née Margetts. His father, from a working-class background in Solihull, West Midlands, studied electro-engineering at college until the outbreak of the Second World War, when he joined the Royal Corps of Signals. Unable to continue his studies, he became, by his son's recollection, "a tailor or something of that sort", then a meter repairman for the electricity board, going on to work at the Fawley oil refinery on Southampton Water. He was also a lay preacher.

Floyd was brought up in a council house in the small town of Wiveliscombe in Somerset, where his mother grew up. He referred to his upbringing as "a very happy rural childhood". His family made financial sacrifices to enable him to be educated privately at Wellington School, Somerset. Popular and a good rugby player, he was forced to leave at 16 due to lack of money.

Floyd became a cub reporter on the Bristol Evening Post. He claimed, perhaps jokingly, that he decided to join the British Army in 1963 after watching the film Zulu, although the film was not released until 1964. Having turned down the 11th Hussars he was commissioned as second lieutenant in the "less snooty" Royal Tank Regiment serving on Centurion tanks, where he pestered the mess cook to produce gourmet dinners.

After three years, finding that he and the Army were "mutually incompatible", Floyd worked in several catering-related jobs including barman, dishwasher and vegetable peeler.

== Career ==
By 1971 Floyd had acquired three restaurants in Bristol: Floyd's Bistro in Princess Victoria Street in Clifton, Floyd's Restaurant in Alma Vale Road and Keith Floyd's Restaurant in Chandos Road, Redland. All three restaurants had financial problems. Floyd sold the restaurants and the rights to the name "Floyd's Restaurant" and moved to the south of France, where again he opened a restaurant in L'Isle-sur-la-Sorgue in the Vaucluse. After this again ended in financial problems, he moved back to Britain. With the help of loans from friends, he opened another restaurant, again in Chandos Road, Bristol.

The restaurant in Chandos Road was frequented by actors and others connected with television. Floyd's first cookery book, Floyd's Food, published before he became a TV celebrity, had an introduction written by Leonard Rossiter, star of British TV sitcoms Rising Damp and The Fall and Rise of Reginald Perrin.

Floyd's first foray into the world of show business was as a radio chef on Radio West, an independent commercial radio station in Bristol. TV producer David Pritchard then offered him a slot on BBC West regional magazine show RPM, presented by Andy Batten Foster. That led, in 1984, to his being offered his first BBC TV series Floyd on Fish, which started his rapid rise to national popularity. Floyd never described himself as a chef since he was untrained.

He became well known for cooking with a glass of wine in one hand, often in unusual locations such as a fishing boat in rough seas. He was regarded as a pioneer of taking cooking programmes out of the studio. Floyd presented his shows around the world, cooking on location in his unique chaotic style.

Floyd bought and ran the Maltsters Arms in Tuckenhay, Devon in the late 1980s. When Floyd was not running the kitchen, chefs included Jean-Christophe Novelli. He was more often seen at the bar than in the kitchen. The failure of the Maltsters led to his bankruptcy.

Despite TV success, Floyd continued to have financial problems and personal conflicts. He was declared bankrupt in 1996. The Daily Mirror claims that this happened after he personally guaranteed an order for £36,000 of drinks. He lived in Kinsale, County Cork, Ireland for a time in the mid-1990s.

In April 2008, he travelled to Singapore and Thailand in pursuit of new business ventures in Southeast Asia. Until his death he was actively involved in his restaurant Floyd's Brasserie, located at the Burasari Resort on the popular Thai island of Phuket. This was his first Asian restaurant and Phuket's first ever celebrity chef restaurant, drawing a large following of Floyd fans who remembered his many TV series and cookbooks.

Floyd travelled widely to cook local dishes and entertain people around the world.

In September 2009, a documentary Keith Meets Keith, featuring actor and comedian Keith Allen interviewing Floyd, was broadcast on Channel 4 and watched by nearly one million people. In the programme Floyd was severely critical of modern television chefs for promoting themselves more than the food. Floyd admitted away from the cameras that he often drank too much out of loneliness. It later emerged that Floyd had collapsed and died a few hours before the broadcast.

In 2020, Floyd was the subject of Keith Floyd's Bristol, a documentary presented by Xander Brett. It was produced by Burst Radio, later broadcast on BBC Radio Bristol to mark eleven years since his death.

=== Other television work ===
In 1991, he was the subject of This Is Your Life when he was surprised by Michael Aspel in The Brazen Head pub in Dublin.

Floyd can also be seen in a number of episodes of the children's television series Balamory, as a chef in Suzie Sweet's "Suzie's Cooking" song.

In 2006, he also appeared on the ITV show Ant & Dec's Saturday Night Takeaway, demonstrating to the pair how to bake a cake for their Ant vs Dec challenge of cake decorating, resulting in Dec (Donnelly) winning the challenge.

== Honours ==
Floyd had a bistro bar named after him in Thailand on the island of Koh Samui, Floyd's Beach Bistro Restaurant; Floyd visited it while filming the series Far Flung Floyd in Thailand and developed a close relationship with the family who owned the resort.

== Personal life ==
All four of Floyd's marriages ended in divorce. He had a son and two daughters.

Floyd spent many years in France. In 1974 he moved to Vaucluse department, in the south-east of France, with Paddy Walker and her three young children. Together, they formed a company called Walker Floyd, buying wines in Vaucluse and then driving them back to Bristol to be sold to the city's bars and restaurants. They would then buy interesting, and carefully picked out, pieces of bric-a-brac to be driven back to Vaucluse for sale in the various markets.

Paddy Walker and Floyd also ran a restaurant together in the village of L'Isle-sur-la-Sorgue in the Vaucluse. In his autobiography, Floyd notes Walker's influence on him: "My approach to food, my style if you like, had developed as a result of my life in France with Paddy." In 1979, after five years together, Walker and Floyd's relationship broke down and they returned to Britain. In the 1980s and 1990s Floyd lived on and off at his home in Kinsale, Ireland.

In his last few years Floyd moved back to Avignon in the Vaucluse department.

Floyd was a big fan of rock group the Stranglers: the tracks "Waltzinblack", an edited version of "Peaches", and an instrumental version of "Viva Vlad" were used as theme music for most of his TV programmes.

== Illness and death ==
In October 2002, Floyd, a smoker and a heavy drinker, was reported to have suffered a mild stroke, although he denied this in his autobiography. In November 2004 he was banned from driving for 32 months and fined £1,500 after crashing his car into another vehicle while three-and-a-half times over the legal alcohol limit. He suspected he had lung cancer or emphysema in early 2006, but was given the all-clear after a medical examination. In the summer of 2006 he was diagnosed as suffering from malnutrition.

In August 2007, he was hospitalised in Thailand after collapsing in a restaurant. He collapsed at a pub in Chesterton, Staffordshire, on 29 January 2008 and was in a coma in hospital on a life-support machine. He was discharged on 22 February, travelling to his home in France to recuperate. He made a full recovery. On 14 September 2008, exactly a year before his death, he collapsed and was hospitalised for several days.

Floyd died of a heart attack, aged 65, on 14 September 2009, at the Dorset County Hospital in Dorchester, Dorset, after being taken ill at the home of his partner Celia Martin (née Constanduros).

The following day, other chefs were quoted in the media. Antony Worrall Thompson said of him: "I think all of us modern TV chefs owe a living to him. He kind of spawned us all." Marco Pierre White said that Floyd "inspired a nation". White also said, "The thing which is very sad is a little piece of Britain today died which will never be replaced. He was a beautiful man, his ability to inspire people to cook just with his words and the way he did things was extraordinary. If you look at TV chefs today they don't have his magic."

Floyd's humanist funeral took place on 30 September 2009 in Bristol.
