= Wilfrid Cracroft Ash =

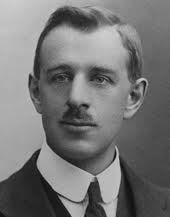
- Born: 2 February 1884; Sculcoates, East Riding of Yorkshire, England
- Died: 9 December 1968 (aged 84)
- Known for: Vizagapatam Harbour; Prestressed concrete Co-founder of Gilbert-Ash Ltd
- Spouses: Beatrice Millicent Baxter; Edith Maud Harper

Wilfrid Cracroft Ash (2 February 1884 – 9 December 1968) was a civil engineer and co-founder of the construction company Gilbert-Ash. He is noted for technological inventions in pre-stressed concrete, was designer and engineer-in-chief of the Vizagapatam harbour between 1928 and 1933, and was engineer-in-chief for the world’s largest Royal Ordnance Factory based in Swynnerton, Staffordshire between 1940 and 1945.

== Education and personal life ==
Wilfrid Ash was born in Sculcoates, East Riding of Yorkshire, England to engineer father, William Ash, and mother Phoebe (née Cracroft). His general education was at Ipswich Endowed School and, having studied privately with Bertram Lawrence Hurst between 1903 and 1907, he gained a B.Sc (Engineering) in 1909 from London University. The same year, he married Beatrice Millicent Baxter and they had two children together, Marjory Yvonne (b. 1915 in Calcutta, India) and Maurice Anthony Ash, the environmentalist, writer and planner, in Hazaribagh, India. Beatrice died in 1917 during childbirth. In 1926 Wilfrid remarried, Edith Maud Harper, in Calcutta. They had one son, Michael Edward Ash (b.1927), the mathematician and brewer who invented ‘Easy Serve’ Draught Guinness and who pioneered the nitro-beer category. Wilfrid Ash died on 9 December 1968 at his home in Petersfield, UK.

== Career ==
In his early years, Wilfrid Ash was engaged in the construction of the gun-batteries at Portsmouth Harbour. In 1907 he joined the Indian Civil Service and in 1909 became a Member of the Institution of Civil Engineers. He was posted to Calcutta in 1910 where he was responsible for the completion of King George's Dock. In 1928, he relocated to Vizagapatam, as engineer-in-chief, to design and supervise the construction of the new Vizagapatam Harbour (now called Visakhapatnam Port). Here he implemented the unique feature of scuttling, end-to-end, two tramp ships (each of about 400 feet in length and of about 3,000 tons) to form a revetment, enabling the containment of silting from the harbour area. The docks were completed in 1933. Two years later, Sir Clement Hindley said:

"The confidence which the Government of India placed in Mr. Ash had been most fully justified."

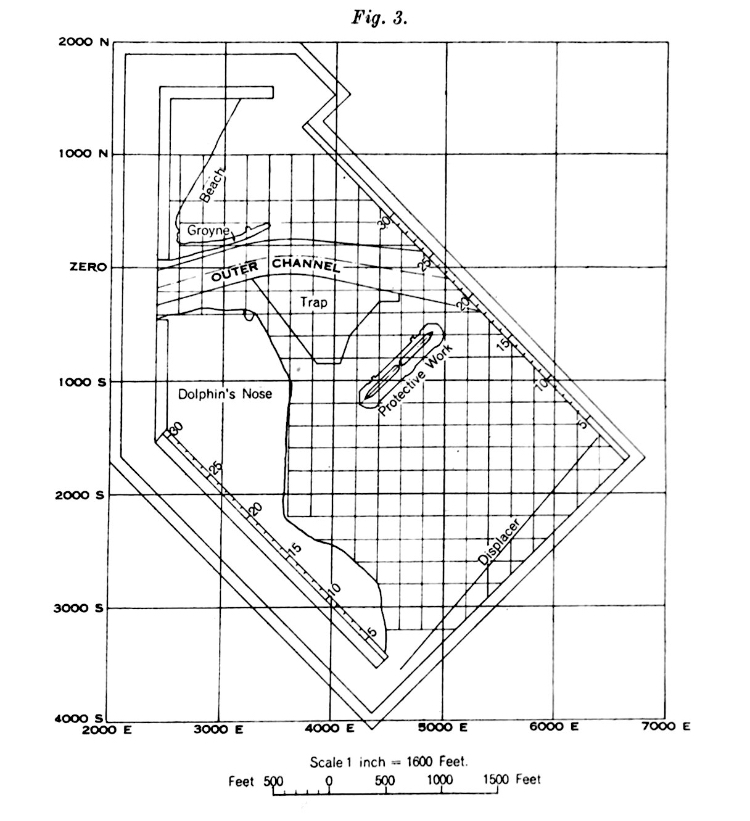
WC Ash's revetment design at Vizagapatam Harbour Journal of the Institution of Civil Engineers Vol.1 Issue.2 Page 247

Ash retired from the Indian Civil Service in 1938 and, following the outbreak of WWII in 1939, he became a consultant to Sir Alexander Gibb & Partners, later joining the Ministry of Supply. He became engineer-in-chief for Bovis of the world’s largest ordnance factory, ROF Swynnerton, overseeing the erection of 1,700 buildings within just nine months. At the height of the war, the Swynnerton factory employed approximately 18,000 labourers and, as an arsenal, was instrumental in securing victory over the Nazis in 1945. In 1964, the MP for Newcastle-under-Lyme, Stephen Swingler commented:

"At the peak of the war this factory in the heart of the Staffordshire countryside employed a total of 25,000 (sic.) workers. It made a most important contribution as an arsenal of the weapons of war to victory over the Nazis in 1945."

Ash also acted as consultant for the flotation of the Mulberry Harbour Phoenix Units used in the Normandy Landings.

In 1946 he joined Paul Gilbert and with him founded the construction firm Gilbert-Ash Ltd (Initially Bovis (Public Works) Ltd; name changed to Gilbert-Ash Ltd 9 February 1946 before becoming Bovis Engineering Ltd on 20 February 1990), with which he remained until retiring in 1961 at the age of 77. Ash was a pioneer of industrial building, realising the advantages of using pre-stressed, precast concrete components to speed building operations and devoting much of his time, with the Ministry of Education, to the development of the Intergrid construction system for educational buildings.

== Publications ==
Minutes of the Proceedings of the Institution of Civil Engineers. Selected Engineering Papers Vol. 233 Issue 1932 (1932) PART 1. E-ISSN|1753-7843

- Calcutta Port Extensions W C Ash (Paper No. 4842). pp. 324-360
- The Construction and Sinking of Monoliths at King George’s Dock, Calcutta James David Pearson with information by Mr Ash (Paper No. 4841). pp. 361-375
- Correspondence on 4841 & 4852 Calcutta Port Extensions. The Construction and Sinking of Monoliths at King George’s Dock Calcutta. W C Ash. pp. 398-411

The Institution of Civil Engineers. Selected Engineering Papers Vol. 1 Issue 122 (1932). E-ISSN 1753-7827

- An experiment on quay-walls at King George’s Docks, Calcutta. W C Ash

The Journal of the Institution of Civil Engineers. Vol. 1 Issue 2 (December 1935) E-ISSN|0368-2455

- Vizagapatam Harbour. Part I – General notes. Part II – Construction. W C Ash & O B Rattenbury pp.235-314
- Discussion. Vizagapatam Harbour. General notes. Constructions. Pp. 315-333

== Bibliography ==
- Biographical Dictionary of Civil Engineers in Great Britain and Ireland- Volume 3: 1890-1920 Edited by RC McWilliam & M Chrimes. ICE Publishing (2014) ISBN 978-0-7277-5834-7
- ROF Swynnerton - Bullets, Bombs & Roses by Graham Bebbington. Churnet Valley Books (2018) ISBN 978-0-9956-0398-1
