= French frigate Oiseau (1769) =

History

France
- Name: Oiseau
- Namesake: bird
- Builder: Rochefort
- Laid down: 1767
- Launched: 11 January 1769
- In service: November 1770
- Fate: Captured on 31 January 1779.

General characteristics
- Displacement: 950 tonneaux
- Tons burthen: 485 port tonneaux
- Length: 44.5 metres
- Beam: 10.1 metres
- Draught: 4.5 metres
- Propulsion: Sail
- Armament: 26 × 12-pounder long guns; 6 × 6-pounder long guns
- Armour: Timber

Oiseau was a 32-gun frigate of the French Navy.

== Career ==
In 1772, Oiseau was under Captain De Plas, and attached to the Escadre d'évolution under Orvilliers.

From 1773 to 1775, she was attached to the 64-gun Roland for the Second voyage of Kerguelen, under Lieutenant Rosnevet. The Baie de l'Oiseau was named in her honour.

In 1775, she was again attached to the Escadre d'évolution, this time under Captain Bausset and Admiral Guichen. In 1777, she was part of the fleet of Du Chaffault, captained by Roquefeuil-Montpeyroux.

Oiseau took part in the Battle of Ushant on 27 July 1778. On 31 January 1779, as she escorted a convoy from Brest to Saint-Malo, Oiseau encountered the British 32-gun frigate HMS Apollo. The captain of Oiseau, Tarade, signaled the cutter Expéditive to lead the convoy, and detached to attack Apollo. In the subsequent battle, Oiseau lost her foretop, and struck her colours.
