= HMS Glory (1763) =

Royal Navy frigate

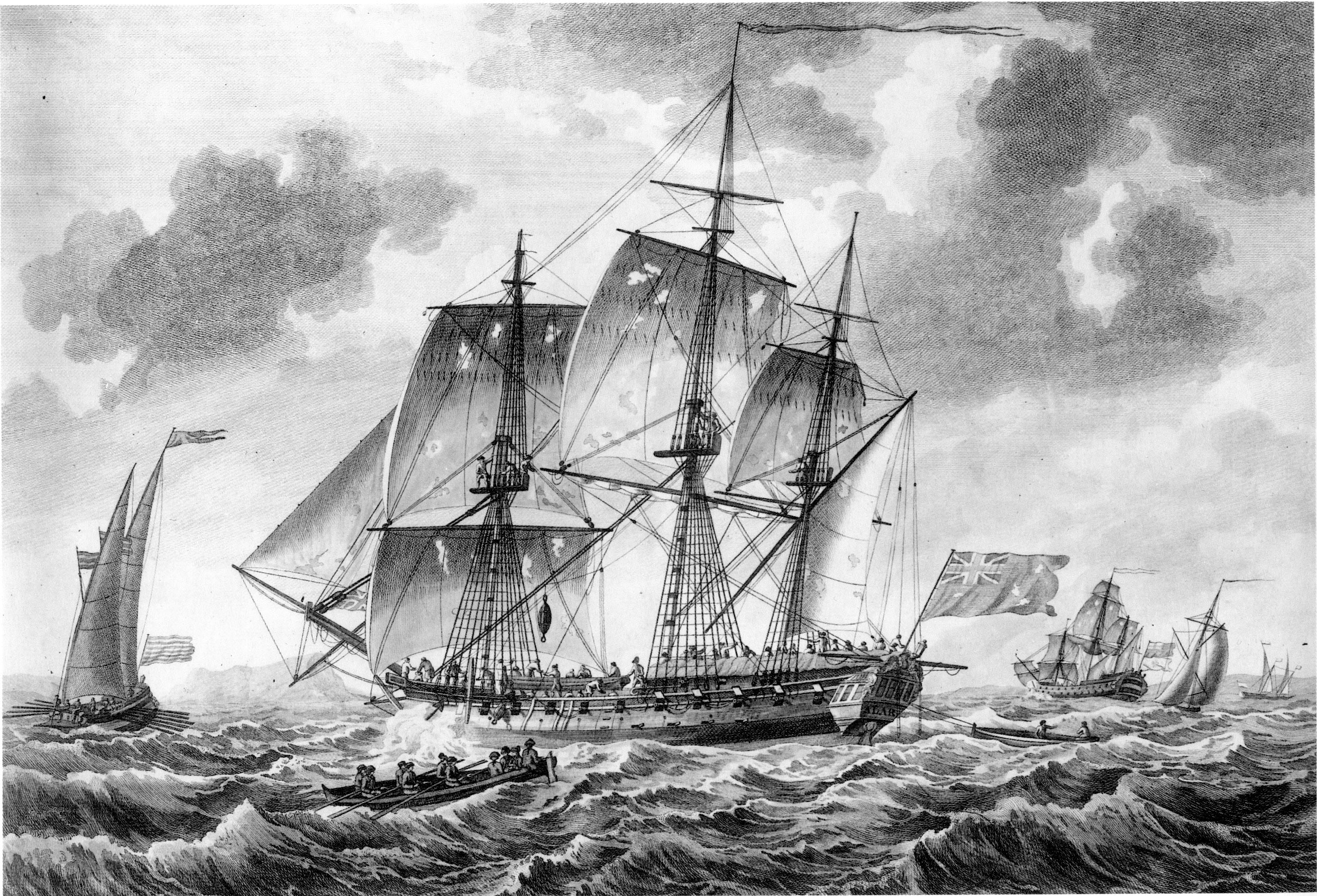
- HMS Alarm, a sister ship of HMS Glory, in 1758

History

Great Britain
- Name: Glory
- Ordered: 30 January 1762
- Builder: Hugh Blaydes & Thomas Hodgson, Hull
- Laid down: March 1762
- Launched: 24 October 1763
- Commissioned: 1769
- Renamed: Apollo in 1774
- Fate: Taken to pieces at Woolwich Dockyard in January 1786.

General characteristics
- Class & type: Niger-class fifth-rate frigate
- Tons burthen: 679.7 bm
- Length: 125 ft (38 m)
- Beam: 35 ft 2 in (10.72 m)
- Depth of hold: 12 ft (3.7 m)
- Sail plan: Full-rigged ship
- Complement: 220
- Armament: Upperdeck: 26 × 12-pounder guns; QD: 4 × 6-pounder guns; Fc: 2 × 6-pounder guns; 12 × ½-pounder swivels

HMS Glory was a 32-gun fifth-rate Niger-class frigate of the Royal Navy, and was the second Royal Navy ship to bear this name.

== Career ==
Glory was ordered during the Seven Years' War, but completed too late for that conflict. She was placed in Ordinary and was not commissioned until May 1769 under Captain John Hollwall, for the Duke of Cumberland's squadron in the English Channel. She was paid off Jan 1773 and was renamed HMS Apollo on 30 August 1774. Afterwards she underwent a large repair at Plymouth from 1776 to 1777. She was recommissioned in January 1777 under Capt. Philemon Pownall and sailed for North America. On 17 January 1778 she captured merchant sloop Friendship on the southern end of the Georges Bank and burned the prize. On 27 January she and HMS Venus captured Massachusetts privateer schooner True Blue on the Georges Bank. On 28 January she recaptured merchant brig Betsy on the southern end of the Georges Bank. On 9 March 1778, the frigate captured the sloop Sally off southern end of Georges Bank, and the schooner Polly the next day.

On 31 January 1779 Apollo captured the 32 gun French frigate Oiseau off the town of Saint-Brieuc after a two hour fight.

== Action of 15 June 1780 ==
Apollo's opponent was the 26-gun French privateer Stanislaus, and after nearly an hour of intense cannonading Pownall was hit by a cannonball and killed. Command of Apollo devolved to Edward Pellew as the first lieutenant, who continued the fight, eventually driving the Stanislaus on shore. Apart from her captain, Apollo lost five men killed and had twenty wounded. The Stanislaus was later recovered and brought into the navy as HMS Proselyte.

== Fate ==
She was broken up at Woolwich Dockyard 30 January 1786.
