= John Giles (died 1553) =

English politician

John Giles, Gelys or Jelys (by 1487 – 1553), of Bowden in Ashprington and Totnes, Devon, was an English politician.

He was a member (MP) of the parliament of England for Totnes in 1529.
