= John Giles (died 1606) =

English politician

John Giles (c. 1533 – 1606), of Totnes and Bowden, Devon, was an English politician.

He was a member (MP) of the parliament of England for Totnes in 1586.
