= Ashprington =

Village in Devon, England

Coordinates: 50.40°N 03.67°W

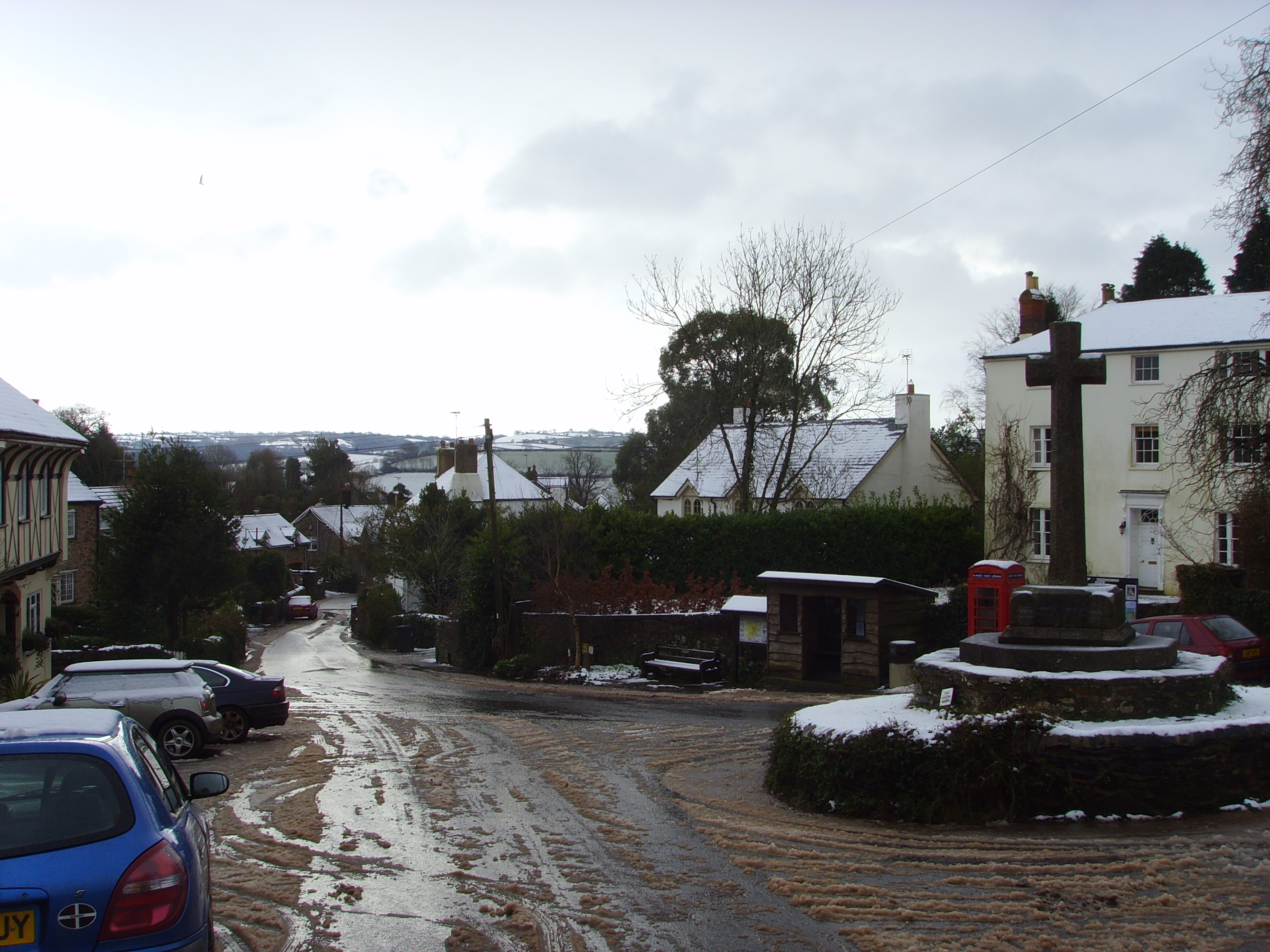

- Location within Devon
- OS grid reference: SX8157
- Civil parish: Ashprington
- District: South Hams
- Shire county: Devon
- Region: South West
- Country: England
- Sovereign state: United Kingdom
- Post town: TOTNES
- Postcode district: TQ9
- Police: Devon and Cornwall
- Fire: Devon and Somerset
- Ambulance: South Western

Ashprington is a village and civil parish in the South Hams district of Devon, England. The village is not far from the River Dart, but high above it, and is about three miles south of Totnes. There is a local pub, hotel and phonebox. The civil parish includes the hamlets of Bow, Painsford and Tuckenhay. Sharpham House is also within the parish and includes Sharpham Vineyard which produces good quality wines. According to the 2001 census the parish had a population of 428.

Ashprington (AISBERTONE) is mentioned in the Domesday Book (1086) with four servants, seven villagers and eight smallholders, a total of 19 people.

The church of St David is fifteenth century, although the font is Norman. There are many carvings within. The communion chalice is pre-Reformation (13th century). The west tower is earlier than the rest of the church; it is tall and of four stages. The south aisle, south porch and the north side of the church are all battlemented. There are monuments to Sir John Kelland of Painsford (died 1679); John Kelland (died 1711); and Jane Pownoll (died 1778).

== Historic estates ==
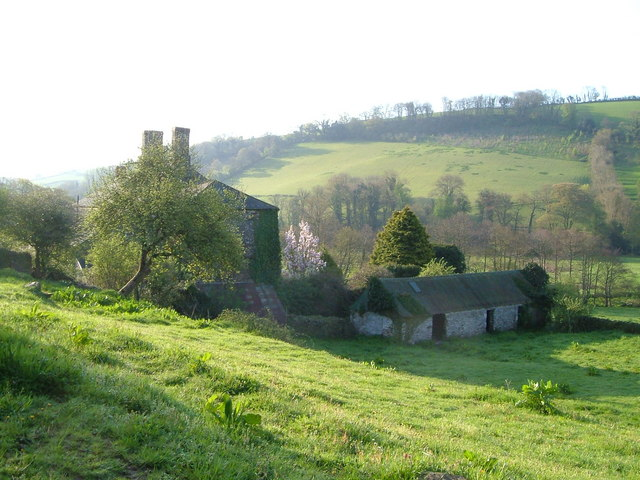
Painsford, now a farmhouse

The parish of Ashprington includes various historic estates including:

- Sharpham
- Bowden
- Painsford, a seat of the Somaster family, then from the 17th century of the Kellond family.

== Notable residents ==
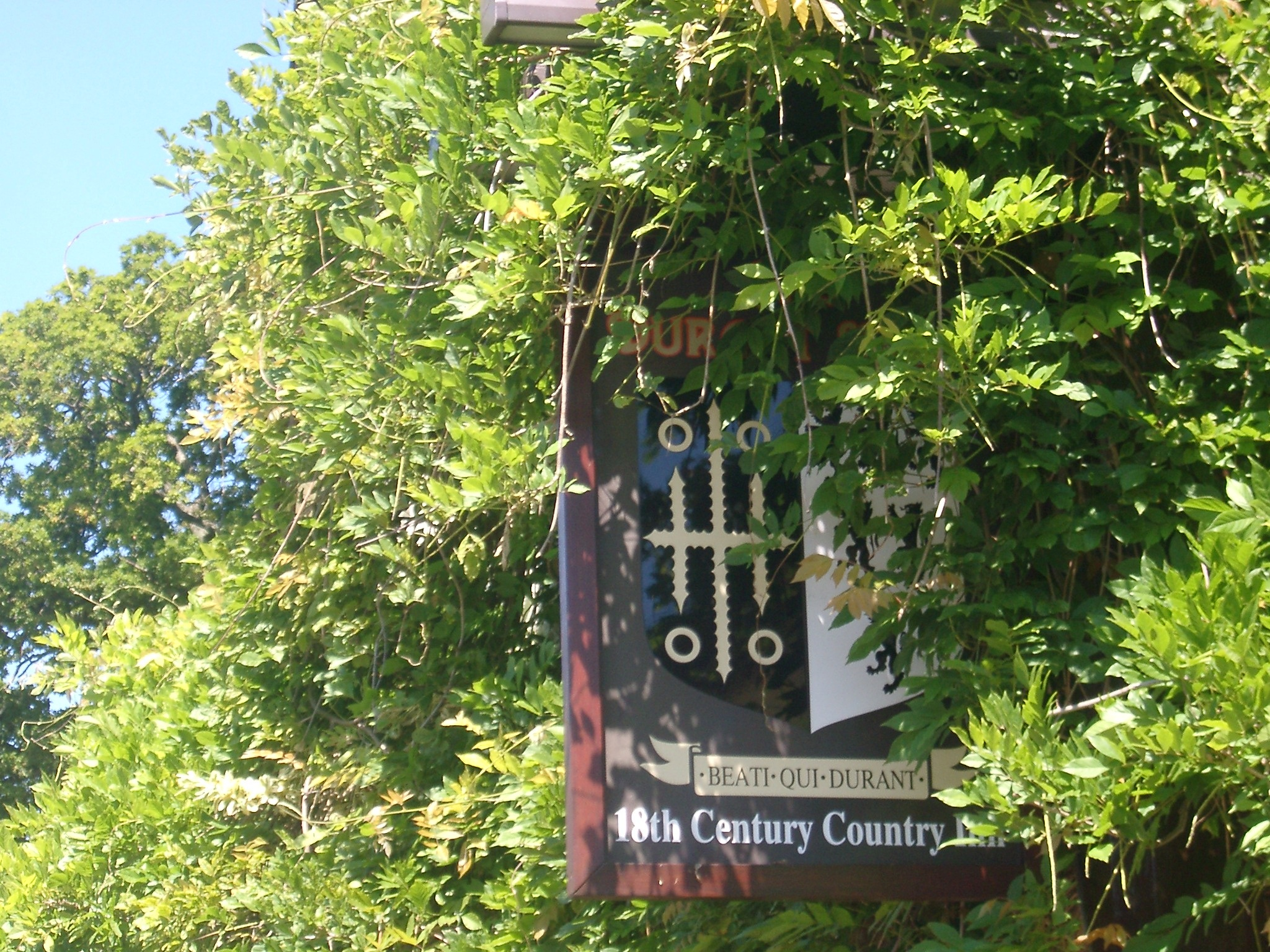
Pub sign

- William Adams (MP) (1752–1811), MP, of Bowden House
- John Burton-Race, restaurateur and TV chef (from ?1995-2008)
- David Llewellyn Novelist and Scriptwriter lived in Ashprington from 1998 to 1999, while a student at Dartington College of Arts
