= Pomeroy (surname) =

Pomeroy or De La Pommeraie is a surname documented from the 11th century. Currently spelled as Pomeroy and the many variations which have occurred over time and geopolitical location. These variations include Pomroy, Pomery, Pumroy, Pummery, Pummeroy, de Pomerai, de Pomeroy, Pommery and Pumfrey.

== Etymology ==
Despite the evident surface analysis of the name as comprising French pomme (meaning "apple") and Old French roy meaning "king" (French: roi), the personal name of the oldest recorded "Pomeroy" — Radulphus de la Pomeray — has no connection with the Old French word roy, but reflects the common French place-name La Pommeraye, which means "orchard of apple-trees", (modern French pommeraie), from pommier "apple-tree" and an old French suffix -aye, now -aie, meaning "a collection of trees". Originally the suffix -aye was masculine : -ey, -ay and sometimes -oy. The secondary phonetic shift -ey > -oy, normally typical of Picard and the Eastern dialects of Langue d'oïl, can sometimes be observed in Normandy.

== Origins of the family ==
There are several La Pommeraye in Normandy, but the sources mention generally two possible birth places of the family, both in Lower Normandy.

One in the Cotentin Peninsula on the commune of Saint-Sauveur-la-Pommeraye, now in the Manche département, 12 km from Granville.

The other possible location is La Pommeraye, commune of the Calvados département between Thury-Harcourt and Pont-d'Ouilly (35 km south from Caen). The château Ganne at La Pommeraye is believed to be the original seat of the family and the de la Pomeroi founded the Val Abbey at Saint-Omer, Calvados.

== History ==
Following the Norman conquest of England, Radulph[us] de la Pomeray is found in the Domesday Book (1086) holding numerous properties as Lord or Tenant-in-chief; 98 in Devon, 2 in Somerset, and 1 in Cornwall. His holdings included a castle at Berry Pomeroy, of which the family retained possession until the second year of the reign of King Edward VI, Henry VIII's son, and the Prayer Book Rebellion in 1549 when the castle was sold to Edward Seymour, Duke of Somerset.

== List of people with this surname ==
- Allan Pomeroy (1907–1966), American politician from Seattle
- Arthur Pomeroy, British divine
- Arthur Pomeroy, 1st Viscount Harberton (1723–1798), Irish politician
- Ben Pomeroy (born 1984), Australian rugby player
- Charles Pomeroy (1825–1891), American politician from Iowa
- Charles A. Pomeroy (1914–1993), American jurist from Maine
- Charles Rhodes Pomeroy (1830–1916), American educator
- Dave Pomeroy (born 1956), American vocalist, songwriter, producer, and bassist
- Duane Pomeroy (born 1952), American politician from Kansas
- Earl Pomeroy (born 1952), American politician from North Dakota
- Earl S. Pomeroy (1915-2005), American historian
- Elsie Lower Pomeroy (1882–1971), American botanical illustrator and painter
- F. W. Pomeroy (1856–1924), British sculptor
- Florence Wallace Pomeroy, Viscountess Harberton (1843-1911), British dress reformer
- Henry Pomeroy, 2nd Viscount Harberton (1749-1829), Irish politician
- Herb Pomeroy (1930–2007), American musician
- Jeannette Scalé (1862-1938) British entrepreneur, known as Mrs Pomeroy
- Jesse Pomeroy (1859–1932), American killer
- Jim Pomeroy (disambiguation), several people:
  - Jim Pomeroy (motorcyclist) (1952–2006), motocross racer
  - Jim Pomeroy (politician) (1936–2016), American politician from North Dakota
  - Jim Pomeroy (artist) (1945–1992), American artist
- John Pomeroy (disambiguation), several people
  - John Pomeroy, American animator
  - John Norton Pomeroy, American lawyer
  - John Pomeroy (British Army officer)
  - John Pomeroy (died 1416), British politician
- Julia Pomeroy, American actress and author
- Ken Pomeroy, American basketball statistician
- Ken Pomeroy (born 2002), Cherokee American singer-songwriter
- Laurence Pomeroy (1883–1941), British automotive engineer
- Lawrence R. Pomeroy (1925–2020), American zoologist, ecologist, and oceanography
- Louise Pomeroy (c. 1853–1893), American actress
- Marcus M. Pomeroy, American newspaperman
- Ralph Pomeroy (disambiguation), several people
- Robert Watson Pomeroy (1902–1989), American politician from New York
- Samuel C. Pomeroy (1816–1891), American politician from Kansas and railroad businessman
- Sarah B. Pomeroy (1938–), American classicist
- Seth Pomeroy (1706–1777), American gunsmith and soldier
- Theodore M. Pomeroy (1824–1905), American politician from New York
- Wardell Pomeroy (1913–2001), American sexologist
- Wesley Pomeroy (1920–1998), American lawyer and public servant
- William J. Pomeroy (1916–2009), American communist

== See also ==
- Viscount Harberton, a title of nobility held by the Pomeroy family since 1791
- Pomeroy (disambiguation)
