= Sir Edward Seymour, 4th Baronet =

British politician (1633–1708)

The Right Honourable Sir Edward Seymour Bt
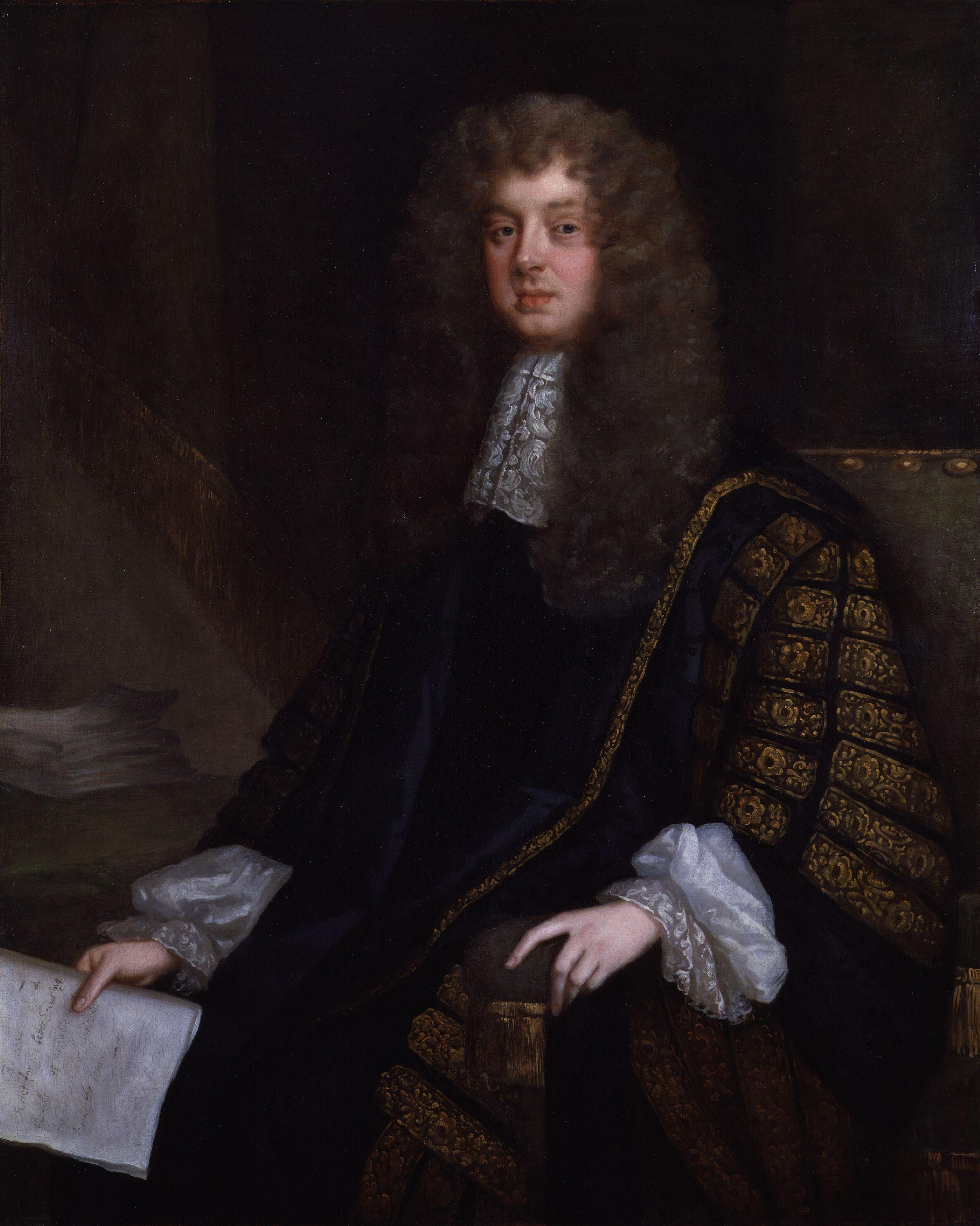

Speaker of the House of Commons
- In office 1673–1679
- Preceded by: Job Charlton
- Succeeded by: William Gregory

Treasurer of the Navy
- In office 1673–1681
- Preceded by: Sir Thomas Osborne
- Succeeded by: The Viscount Falkland

Personal details
- Born: 1632
- Died: 17 February 1708 (aged 75–76)
- Spouse(s): Margaret Wale; Laetitia Popham

Sir Edward Seymour, 4th Baronet (1632/1633 – 17 February 1708) was an English nobleman, and a Royalist and Tory politician.

== Life ==
Born at Berry Pomeroy Castle in Devon, of a family greatly influential in the Western counties, he was the eldest son of Sir Edward Seymour, 3rd Baronet, and his wife Anne Portman, and a descendant of Edward Seymour, 1st Duke of Somerset, in the senior line. (Because of the alleged adultery of the Duke's first wife, the Dukedom had been entailed with preference to his sons by his second marriage.)

Seymour first sat in Parliament in 1661 for Hindon, Wiltshire, a constituency near Maiden Bradley where the family had their principal residence at Bradley House. For much of the rest of his life he represented at various times the Devon county constituency, Totnes and Exeter. A skilled debater and politician, he was twice Speaker of the House of Commons during the Cavalier Parliament, the first non-lawyer to be chosen for that position for a considerable time. However in 1679, he was the only nominee to be Speaker that was refused royal approbation, which led to a prorogation of Parliament.

Seymour was a signatory to The Several Declarations of The Company of Royal Adventurers of England Trading into Africa, a document published in 1667 which led to the expansion of the Royal Africa Company.

He was one of the Lords Commissioners of the Admiralty from 1673 until 1679, when he was made a Privy Counsellor. He also held office as Treasurer of the Navy from 1673 until 1681, Lord Commissioner of the Treasury from 15 November 1690 to 2 May 1696 and Comptroller of the Household from 1702 to 1704. He was also responsible for the Habeas Corpus Act 1679.

Though able, Seymour's character was marred by his haughty pride in his ancestry (much like his cousin, the 6th Duke of Somerset) and by venality. However, his influence was much courted, and he led a powerful faction of Western members in Parliament. An opponent of the Exclusion Bill and a quintessential country gentleman, his Tory credentials were impeccable. Samuel Pepys in his Diary records the unpleasant impression Seymour's arrogance made on most people who met him; nearly 40 years later the Duke of Marlborough wrote that while one should not wish for any person's death, he was sure that Seymour's death would be no great loss.

From the security of this position, Seymour moved that the Loyal Parliament investigate the irregularities surrounding the election of its members before it granted any revenues to James II, but as no other member dared to second it, it brought about no immediate consequence. He continued to oppose the arbitrary measures of James throughout his reign.

During the Glorious Revolution, he was one of the first Tories to declare for the Prince of Orange. The remarks that supposedly passed between the two on the first meeting are indicative of his pride of birth: "I think, Sir Edward," said the Prince, "that you are of the family of the Duke of Somerset." "Pardon me, your highness," replied Seymour, "the Duke of Somerset is of my family." However, he adhered to the Tory party, acting as a sort of whip or manager, and remained a vigorous rhetorical opponent of the Whig. He particularly attacked Lord Somers, the Chancellor, and managed the several attempts made to remove him from office. In 1699, the death of his third son, Popham Seymour-Conway, from the effects of a wound incurred in a duel with Captain George Kirk, prompted him to make an attack upon the standing army. His vigorous defence of his friend Sir Richard Reynell, 1st Baronet, Lord Chief Justice of Ireland, against the absurd charge that he had conspired to kill William of Orange, shows his eloquence in debate and a loyalty to old friends with which he is not always credited.

He seems to have suffered from diabetes in later life, an exchange of wit between Seymour and his physician, Dr. Ratcliffe, being recorded in Joe Miller's Jests. He died at Bradley House.

== Family ==
On 7 September 1661, he married Margaret Wale (d. before 1674), daughter of Sir William Wale, of North Lappenham, Rutland, Alderman of London, and wife, and sister of Elizabeth Wale, married to the Hon. Henry Noel, of North Luffenham, Rutland, Member of Parliament, by whom he had two children:

- Sir Edward Seymour, 5th Baronet (1663–1741), father of Edward Seymour, 8th Duke of Somerset
- Lt.-Gen. William Seymour (1664–1728)

In 1674, he married Laetitia Popham (d. 16 March 1714), daughter of Alexander Popham and his wife Letitia Carre, by whom he had seven children:

- Col. Popham Seymour-Conway (1675–1699)
- Francis Seymour-Conway, 1st Baron Conway (1679–1732), father of Francis Seymour, 1st Marquess of Hertford
- Charles Seymour, of Staston, Dorset, married and had a daughter:
  - Jane Seymour, m. August 1750 Admiral Thomas Lynn
- Anne Seymour (d. 10 May 1752), married 8 January 1707/1708 William Berkeley (who changed his name by a private act of Parliament, Portman's Name Act 1735 (9 Geo. 2. c. 22 Pr.), to William Portman and was thereafter also known as William Berkeley-Portman), of Pylle and Orchard Portman, Somerset (d. 1737), son of Edward Berkeley, of Pylle, Somerset (d. 1707) and wife Elizabeth Ryves (d. 1724), by whom she had a son, Henry William Berkeley-Portman, father of Henry William Portman through his wife Anne Fitch.
- Henry Seymour, died without male issue
- Alexander Seymour, died without male issue
- John Seymour, died young

Parliament of England
Preceded by Sir George Howe, 1st Baronet; Sir Thomas Thynne	Member of Parliament for Hindon; 1661–1679; With: Sir George Howe, Bt 1660–1677; Robert Hyde 1677–1679	Succeeded by Richard Howe; Thomas Lambert
Preceded by Sir John Rolle; Sir Coplestone Bampfylde, Bt	Member of Parliament for Devon; 1679; With: Sir William Courtenay, Bt	Succeeded by Sir William Courtenay, Bt; Samuel Rolle
Preceded by Sir Edward Seymour, 3rd Baronet; John Kelland	Member of Parliament for Totnes; 1679–1681	Succeeded by John Kelland; Charles Kelland
Preceded by Sir Thomas Carew; Thomas Walker	Member of Parliament for Exeter; 1685–1695; With: James Walker 1685–1689; Henry Pollexfen 1689; Christopher Bale 1689–1695	Succeeded by Edward Seyward; Sir Joseph Tily
Preceded by Henry Seymour Portman; Thomas Coulson	Member of Parliament for Totnes; 1695–1699	Succeeded by Thomas Coulson; Francis Gwyn
Preceded by Edward Seyward; Sir Joseph Tily	Member of Parliament for Exeter; 1698–1707; With: Sir Bartholomew Shower 1698–1702; John Snell 1702–1707	Succeeded by Parliament of Great Britain
Parliament of Great Britain
Preceded by Parliament of England	Member of Parliament for Exeter; 1707–1708; With: John Snell	Succeeded by John Snell; John Harris
Political offices
Preceded by Sir Job Charlton	Speaker of the House; 1673–1678	Succeeded by Sir Robert Sawyer
Preceded by Sir Robert Sawyer	Speaker of the House; 1678–1679	Succeeded by Sir William Gregory
Preceded by Sir Thomas Osborne	Treasurer of the Navy; 1673–1681	Succeeded by The Viscount Falkland
Preceded by The Lord Wharton	Comptroller of the Household; 1702–1704	Succeeded by Sir Thomas Mansel, Bt
Baronetage of England
Preceded by Edward Seymour	Baronet (of Berry Pomeroy); 1688–1708	Succeeded by Edward Seymour
