= Buggin (surname) =

Buggin is a surname. Notable people with the surname include:

- Lady Cecilia Buggin (c. 1789–1873), second wife of Prince Augustus Frederick, sixth son of King George III
- Christopher Buggin (1572–1603), English politician
- Edward Buggin (died 1590), English politician

== See also ==
- Critters Buggin, American instrumental music group
- Buggin', song from American film Space Jam
- Bugging, use of a covert listening device
