= Eveleigh (disambiguation) =

Eveleigh is an inner-city suburb of Sydney, New South Wales, Australia.

Eveleigh may also refer to:

== People with the surname ==
- Dennis G. Eveleigh
- Edward Eveleigh
- John Eveleigh (disambiguation), several people
- Nicholas Eveleigh
- William Eveleigh

== See also ==
- Eve Leigh
- Eveleigh Railway Workshops, heritage-listed railway yards in Sydney, Australia
- Eveleigh Street, one of the boundary streets of The Block (Sydney), an Aboriginal housing estate
- Everleigh (disambiguation)
- Everly (disambiguation)
