= Sir Edward Seymour, 3rd Baronet =

English politician

Sir Edward Seymour, 3rd Baronet (10 September 1610 – 4 December 1688) of Berry Pomeroy Castle was an English politician who sat in the House of Commons at various times between 1640 and 1688. He fought for the Royalist cause in the English Civil War.

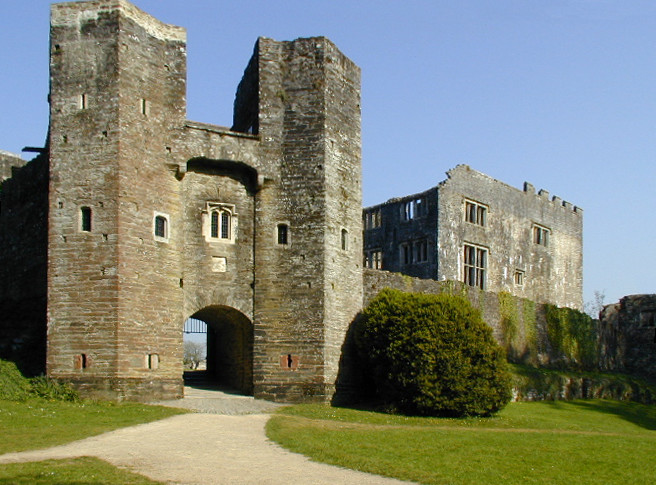
Berry Pomeroy Castle

Seymour was the eldest son of Sir Edward Seymour, 2nd Baronet, of Berry Pomeroy Castle, and his wife Dorothy Killegrew and a descendant of Edward Seymour, 1st Duke of Somerset, in the senior line. Because of the adultery of the Duke's first wife, the Dukedom had been entailed with preference to the sons of his second marriage.

In April 1640, Seymour was elected Member of Parliament for Devon in the Short Parliament. He was re-elected MP for Devon for the Long Parliament in November 1640. He was appointed a colonel in the Royalist army in 1642 and was disabled from sitting in parliament in 1643. In the latter part of the Civil War, he was imprisoned in Exeter and was not released until 1655. He inherited the baronetcy of Berry Pomeroy on the death of his father in 1659.

After the Restoration in 1660, Seymour became Deputy Lieutenant for Devon, In 1661 he was elected MP for Totnes in the Cavalier Parliament and sat until 1679. He was appointed Vice-Admiral of Devon in 1677 and held the position until his death. He served as High Sheriff of Devon for 1679–80. He was re-elected MP for Totnes in 1685 and sat until his death.

Seymour died at the age of 78 and was buried on 7 December 1688. After his death, an inventory of Berry Pomeroy Castle was drawn up.

== Family ==
Seymour married Anne Portman (died 1695) in 1630, the daughter of Sir John Portman, 1st Baronet, of Orchard Portman, Somerset (25 November 1612), and his wife Anne Gifford. They had five sons and one daughter:

- Sir Edward Seymour, 4th Baronet (1633–1708)
- Capt. Hugh Seymour
- Capt. Charles Seymour
- William Seymour, died unmarried
- Henry Seymour Portman, of Orchard Portman, Somerset (c. 1637 – 23 February 1728), who assumed the name of Portman on inheriting from his cousin Sir William Portman, 6th Baronet, married firstly to Penelope Haslewood, daughter of Sir William Haslewood, of Maidwell, Northampton, and married secondly to Meliora Fitch, daughter of William Fitch, of High Hall, Dorset. His widow married Thomas Fownes. He died without issue by either of his marriages
- Elizabeth Seymour, married to Sir Joseph Tredenham, of Tregony, Cornwall

== Ancestry ==
Ancestors of Sir Edward Seymour, 3rd Baronet

Edward Seymour, 1st Duke of Somerset
Lord Edward Seymour
Catherine Fillol
Sir Edward Seymour, 1st Baronet
John Walshe
Margaret Walsh
Sir Edward Seymour, 2nd Baronet
Sir Philip Champernowne
Sir Arthur Champernowne
Elizabeth Champernowne
Sir Henry Norris
Mary Norreys
Mary Fiennes
Sir Edward Seymour, 3rd Baronet
John Killigrew
Sir Henry Killigrew
James Trewenard
Elizabeth Trewenard
Dorothy Killegrew
John Cooke
Sir Anthony Cooke
Alice Saunders
Catherine Cooke
Sir William Waldegrave
Alice Waldegrave

Parliament of England
Vacant Parliament suspended since 1629	Member of Parliament for Devon; 1640–1643; With: Thomas Wise 1640; Sir Samuel Rolle 1641–1643	Succeeded by Sir Samuel Rolle; Sir Nicholas Martyn
Preceded by Thomas Chafe; Thomas Clifford	Member of Parliament for Totnes; 1661–1681; With: Thomas Clifford; Sir Thomas Berry; John Kelland; Edward Seymour	Succeeded by Charles Kelland; John Kelland
Preceded by Charles Kelland; John Kelland	Member of Parliament for Totnes; 1685–1689; With: John Kelland	Succeeded by Rawlin Mallock; Sir John Fowell, 3rd Baronet
Baronetage of England
Preceded by Edward Seymour	Baronet (of Berry Pomeroy); 1659–1688	Succeeded by Edward Seymour
