= James Cornish =

British politician

James Cornish (25 August 1792 – 7 September 1865) was a British politician.

Cornish lived near Totnes in Devon, where he followed his father in becoming a solicitor, the two then forming a partnership. At the 1832 UK general election, he stood for the Whigs in Totnes, winning a seat. He stood down by accepting the Chiltern Hundreds in 1834. In 1852/53, he served as Sheriff of Devon.

Parliament of the United Kingdom
Preceded by Charles Barry Baldwin; Thomas Courtenay	Member of Parliament for Totnes; 1832–1834; With: Jasper Parrott	Succeeded by Jasper Parrott; Edward Seymour
Civic offices
Preceded by Richard Durant	High Sheriff of Devon; 1852–1853	Succeeded by Edmund Gennys
