= Sebright (disambiguation) =

The Sebright is a breed of chicken.

Sebright may also refer to:

- Sebright, Ontario, Canada
- Sebright baronets, a title in the Baronetage of England
- Sebright School in Wolverley, Worcestershire, England, now Heathfield Knoll School

== People with the surname ==
- Danny Sebright (born 1961), president of the U.S.-U.A.E. Business Council
- Georgina Mary Sebright, Lady Sebright (1833–1874), British Balkan sympathiser and writer
- John Sebright (disambiguation)
- Sir Thomas Sebright, 4th Baronet (1692–1736), British landowner and politician
- William Sebright (died 1692), Town Clerk of London who founded the Sebright School in Wolverley, Worcestershire, England

== See also ==
- Operation Seabight, the 2008 seizure of cocaine off the coast of Ireland
- Sea Bright, New Jersey, United States
- Seabright, Nova Scotia, Canada
