= Senator Pomeroy (disambiguation) =

Samuel C. Pomeroy (1816–1891) was a U.S. Senator from Kansas from 1861 to 1873. Senator Pomeroy may also refer to:

- Jim Pomeroy (politician) (born 1936), North Dakota State Senate
- Robert Watson Pomeroy (1902–1989), New York State Senate
- Theodore M. Pomeroy (1824–1905), New York State Senate
