= Wastell =

Wastell is a surname. Notable people with the surname include:

- Robert Wastell (fl. 1406 – 1410), English politician
- John Wastell (c. 1460 – c. 1518), English architect and mason
