= John Pomeroy (died 1416) =

English politician

Member of Parliament for Totnes
- In office 1407

High Sheriff of Devon
- In office 1399

Personal details
- Born: c. 1347 England
- Died: 1416 (aged 68–69)

Sir John Pomeroy (c. 1347 – 1416), of Berry Pomeroy, Devon, was an English politician.

He was a Member (MP) of the Parliament of England for Totnes in 1407.

Parliament of England
Preceded by Robert Wastell; John Warwick	Member of Parliament for Totnes; 1407; With: Alfred Wonston	Succeeded by Henry Austin; Robert Wastell
Political offices
Preceded by William Beaumont	High Sheriff of Devon; 1399	Succeeded by John Keynes
