= Henry Berkeley =

Henry Berkeley may refer to:

- Henry Berkeley (MP for Totnes), Member of Parliament (MP) for Totnes, 1414–1421
- Henry Berkeley (died 1587), MP for East Grinstead in 1571
- Henry Berkeley, 7th Baron Berkeley (1534–1613), English peer
- Henry Berkeley (MP for Ilchester) (1579–1667), English politician
- Henry Berkeley (British Army officer) (died 1736), soldier, courtier, and MP for Gloucestershire
- Henry FitzHardinge Berkeley (1794–1870), MP for Bristol
- Henry Spencer Berkeley (1851–1918), barrister and Chief Justice of Fiji
