= Simon Marsh (disambiguation) =

Simon Marsh is a footballer.

Simon Marsh may also refer to:

- Simon Marsh (MP)
- Simon Marsh, executive producer of Celebrity Super Spa
