= Everly =

Everly may refer to:

== People ==
- Don and Phil Everly, singers known as The Everly Brothers
- Jack Everly, American conductor and music arranger

== Places ==
- Everly, Iowa, United States
- Everly, Seine-et-Marne, France

== Other uses ==
- Everly (film), a 2014 film
- Everly (group), an American folk music group
- Everly (given name)
- Everly Lake, a body of water in Boise County, Idaho

== See also ==
- Eveleigh (disambiguation)
- Everleigh (disambiguation)
