= Jasper Parrott (MP) =

British politician

Jasper Parrott (1786 – 15 December 1866) was a British politician.

Parrott lived at Dundridge, in Devon. At the 1832 UK general election, he stood for the Whigs in Totnes, winning a seat. In Parliament, he argued for shorter Parliamentary terms, and for the bishops to lose their automatic seats in the House of Lords. He held his seat until 1839, when he resigned.

Parliament of the United Kingdom
Preceded by Charles Barry Baldwin; Thomas Courtenay	Member of Parliament for Totnes; 1832–1839; With: James Cornish (1832–1834); Edward Seymour (1834–1839)	Succeeded by William Blount; Charles Barry Baldwin; Edward Seymour
