= John Bent (politician) =

British politician, also active in Ireland

John Bent (c. 1775 – 6 October 1848), of Weaton House, Devon and Oathall, Lindfield, Sussex was an English Tory politician.

He was a Member (MP) for Sligo from 1818 to 1820, and for Totnes from 1820 to 1826.

Alongside significant investments in property, Bent was also involved in the slave trade. He was heavily involved in the scandal of the Arigna Iron and Coal Mining Company towards the end of his parliamentary career.

Parliament of the United Kingdom
Preceded by Sir Brent Spencer	Member of Parliament for Sligo; 1818 – 1820	Succeeded by Owen Wynne
Preceded by Thomas Courtenay; William Holmes	Member of Parliament for Totnes; 1820 – 1826; With: Thomas Courtenay	Succeeded by Thomas Courtenay; The Earl of Darlington
