= Brasuter =

Brasuter is a surname. Notable people with the surname include:

- Henry Brasuter, English politician
- John Brasuter, MP for Dartmouth (UK Parliament constituency)
