= Philip Foale Rowsell =

British pharmacist, insurance expert and politician

Philip Rowsell

Philip Foale Rowsell CBE JP FCS FCII (10 July 1864 – 1 May 1946), was a pharmacist, insurance expert, British Liberal Party politician and a prominent figure in civic life in Exeter and Devon.

== Background ==
Rowsell was the son of Benjamin Joseph Rowsell, of Yeovil, Somerset. He was educated at Kingston School, Yeovil. In 1895 he married Florence Elizabeth Turner. They had one son and one daughter. He later on married Mrs F. I. M. Norton. In 1938 he was made a Commander of the Order of the British Empire.

== Professional career ==
Rowsell was a pharmacist. He was a Fellow of the Chemical Society. He was Director of the South Western Board of Sun Insurance. He was Director of the North Devon and Cornwall Railway. He was a Fellow of the Chartered Insurance Institute. He was Treasurer and Past President of the National Association of Insurance Committees. He was Chairman of the Devon Insurance Committee from 1916–45.

== Political career ==
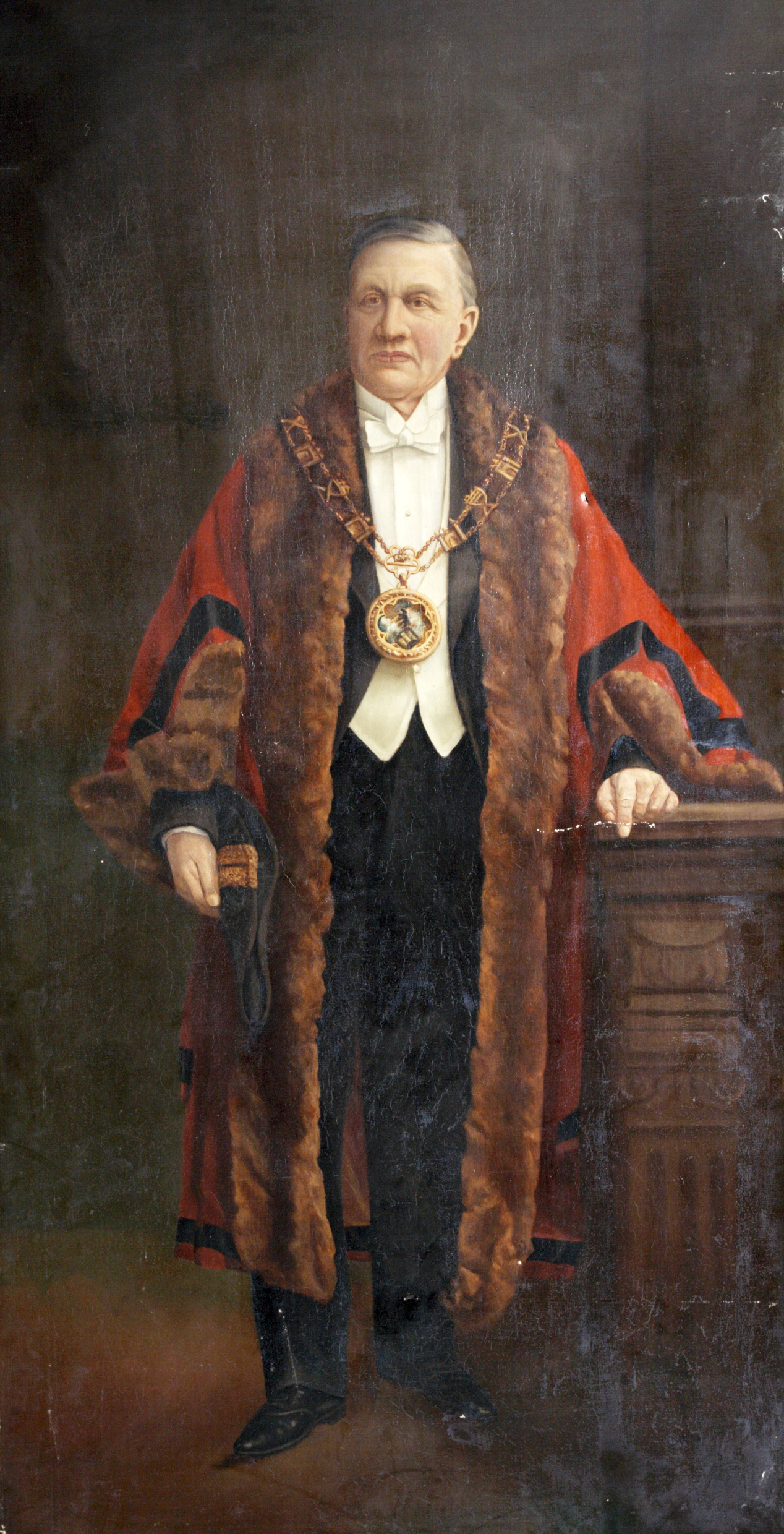
Philip Foal Rowsell as Mayor of Exeter

In 1911 he was appointed by the Liberal government as a Member of the Central Advisory Committee for the setting up of National Health Insurance. In 1914 he was selected as Liberal prospective parliamentary candidate for Somerset division of Bridgwater. This was a Unionist seat that had only been won by the Liberals in the 1906 landslide. However, due to the outbreak of war, the general election was postponed. During the European War he was Chairman of Recruiting and War Savings Committees. By the time the elections took place in 1918, a Coalition government sought re-election and gave endorsement to the sitting Unionist MP. As a result, he withdrew and did not contest the 1918 elections. In 1920 he was appointed a Member of the Central Profiteering Committee. He then concentrated on local government in Exeter and as a member of Devon County Council. He was a County Alderman and Chairman of the Finance Committee. He served as Mayor of Exeter from 1921–24. He was Founder and Chairman of the Devon and Exeter Cancer Fund. During his three-year term as Mayor, he made the Devon and Exeter Cancer Fund his mayoral charity and raised £11,000 to equip the new X-ray, Radium and Electrical Treatment Department at the RD&E. He was vice-president and Treasurer of the University College of the South West. He was President of the Exeter and Western Counties Hospital Aid Society. He served as a Justice of the peace in Devon and Exeter. He was Liberal candidate for the Totnes division of Devon at the 1929 General Election. The seat had been Liberal until 1924 when it was lost to the Unionists. The Unionists held onto the seat, though their majority was reduced;

General Election 1929 Electorate 54,471
Party	Candidate	Votes	%	±%
Unionist	Samuel Harvey	21,673	47.8	−5.9
Liberal	Philip Foale Rowsell	17,790	39.3	−0.9
Labour	Kate Florence Spurrell	5,828	12.9	+6.8
Majority		3,883	8.5	−5.0
Turnout			83.1	−3.0
Unionist hold		Swing	-2.5	

He did not stand for parliament again.
