= Gildon =

Gildon is a surname. Notable people with the surname include:

- Charles Gildon (c. 1665–1724), English author
- Chris Gildon (born 1971 or 1972), American real estate broker and politician
- Henry Gildon (before 1533 to after 1592), English politician
- Jason Gildon (born 1972), American football player
