= Poltimore (disambiguation) =

Poltimore is a village and civil parish in Devon, England.

Poltimore may also refer to:

- Poltimore, Quebec, Canada, in Val-des-Monts
- Baron Poltimore, a title in the Peerage of the United Kingdom for Poltimore, Devon
- John Poltimore (fl. 1390), English politician
