= Thomas Coulson =

Thomas Coulson may refer to:

- Thomas Coulson (rugby union) (1898–1948), English rugby union player
- Thomas Coulson (MP) (1645–1713), English politician
