= List of mayors of Totnes =

Totnes, Devon, England received its first borough charter from King John and the recorded list of mayors dates from 1359. The town was incorporated in 1505 with a governing structure consisting of a mayor, recorder and a single council of burgesses. A further charter in 1596 concentrated power in the hands of the town's leading merchants, redefining the corporation as a governing body of 14 "masters", including the mayor, with an inferior council of 20 burgesses. The masters filled vacancies in their ranks by co-option and nominated the mayoral candidates.

The following have been mayors of Totnes:

- 1396–1398: Walter Browning (MP for Totnes), 1388
- 1399–1400: Walter Browning
- 1401–1403: Walter Browning
- 1517-1518: John Giles
- 1535-1537: Christopher Savery
- 1548-1549: Christopher Savery
- 1556-1557: Christopher Savery
- 1585–1586: Nicholas Ball
- 1589–1590: Nicholas Hayman
- 1593–1594: Leonard Darr
- 1598–1599: Philip Holditch (MP for Totnes, 1601)
- 1605–1606: Christopher Wise
- 1612-1613: Richard Rodd
- 1620: Richard Lee (died 1620)
- 1621–1622: Christopher Wise
- 1623–1624: Philip Holditch II (son of Philip Holditch above, MP for Totnes, 1626)
- 1638–1639: Philip Holditch II
- 1687: Robert Symons
- 1718–1719: Nicholas Trist (High Sheriff of Devon, 1708)
- 1737–1738: Nicholas Trist (High Sheriff of Devon, 1708)
- 1754-1755: Benjamin Babbage (grandfather of Charles Babbage)
- 1780–1781: William Adams (MP for Plympton Erle 1796–1801 and Totnes 1801–1811)
- 1788–1789: William Adams
- 1797–1798: William Adams
- 1866–1867: Thomas Edward Owen
- 1870–1871: Robert W. Chaster
- 1872: Robert Bourne
- 1873: James Smith Rose
- 1874–1875: Jeffery Michelmore
- 1876–1877: Joseph Roe
- 1878: John P. F. P. Haines
- 1879: Jeffery Michelmore
- 1880–1881: Edward Harris
- 1882–1884: Frederick Bowden
- 1902-1903: Dr. J. G. Gibson
- 1945–1946: Lilley Ramsden (first female mayor of Totnes)
- 1950–1951: Charles Stanley Jacka
- 1970–1971: Jean M Gilbert

== 21st century ==
- 2001–2002: Pruw Boswell-Harper
- 2003–2004: J.A. Westacott
- 2004–2005: Jim Parkes
- 2005–2007: Pruw Boswell-Harper
- 2008–2009: David Horsburgh
- 2009–2010: Jean Rosemary Harrop
- 2010–2011: Anthony Whitty
- 2011–2012: Judy Westacott
- 2012–2014: Pruw Boswell-Harper
- 2014–2016: Jacqui Hodgson
- 2016–2017: Eleanor Cohen
- 2017–2018: Rosie Adam
- 2018–2019: Judy Westacott
