= William Blount (Totnes MP) =

English barrister and politician (1799–1885)

William Blount (April 1799 – 27 July 1885) was an English barrister and politician who was briefly a member of parliament (MP).

Blount lived at Orleton in Herefordshire. He studied at Gray's Inn from 1827, and became a barrister in 1833. In 1867, he became a bencher at Gray's Inn.

Blount was elected MP for Totnes in the 1839 by-election. That by-election returned two members, Blount and Charles Barry Baldwin. The by-election was subsequently voided.

Parliament of the United Kingdom
Preceded by Jasper Parrott; Edward Seymour	Member of Parliament for Totnes; 1839–1840; With: Edward Seymour; Charles Barry Baldwin	Succeeded by Edward Seymour; Charles Barry Baldwin
