= John Pomeroy (disambiguation) =

John Pomeroy (born 1951) is an American animator.

John Pomeroy may also refer to:

- John Norton Pomeroy, American lawyer
- John Pomeroy (British Army officer)
- John Pomeroy (died 1416), MP for Totnes
- John Pomeroy (hydrologist)
