= Nicholas Ball =

Nicholas or Nick Ball may refer to:

- Nicholas Ball (actor) (1946–2024), British actor
- Nicholas Ball (alderman) (died 1609), Irish merchant and public official
- Nicholas Ball (lawyer) (1791–1865), Irish lawyer and judge and the father of the naturalist John Ball
- Nicholas Ball (MP) (died 1586), MP for Totnes
- Nick Ball (boxer) (born 1997), English boxer
