= Christopher Buggin =

16th-century English politician

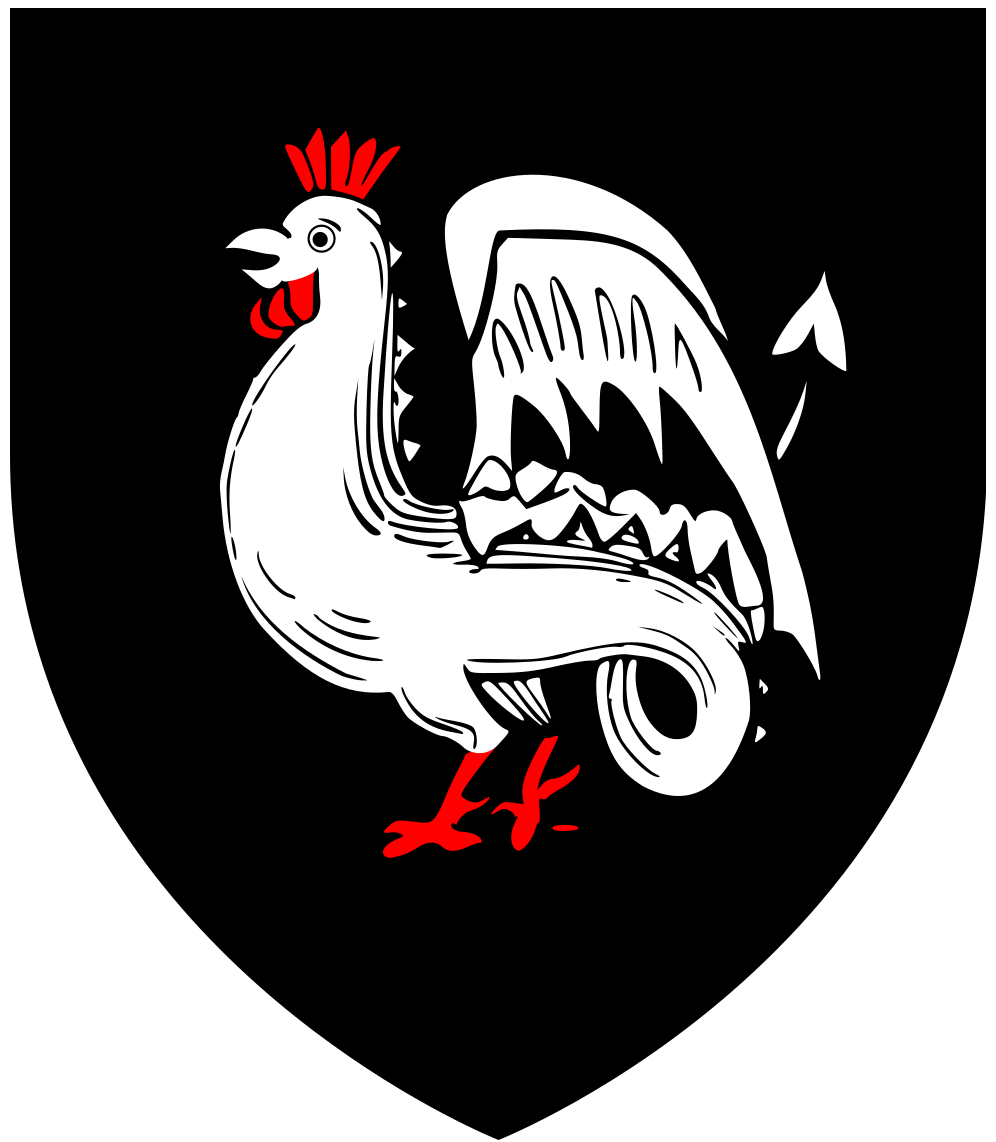
Arms of Bogan: Sable, a cockatrice (displayed) argent crested membered and jelloped gules

Christopher Buggin (1572–1603), (alias Bogan) of Totnes, Devon, was a Member of Parliament for Totnes in 1597.

== Origins ==
He was a son of Walter Bogan (d. 1591) of Totnes (son of William Bogan, Mayor of Totnes), by his wife Prothayzey (alias Prothesia) Bodley, a daughter of John Bodley (d. 1591) and a sister of Sir Thomas Bodley (1545–1613), diplomat and founder of the Bodleian Library, Oxford.

== Marriage ==
He married Anne Sarrel, a daughter of Nicholas Sarrel (alias Sarrett).
