= Roger Prideaux (MP) =

16th-century English politician

Roger Prideaux (by 1524 – 8 January 1582), of Soldon, Holsworthy, Devon and London, was an English politician.

He was a member (MP) of the parliament of England for Totnes in 1545 and 1547.
