= John Wotton =

16th-century English politician

John Wotton (by 1523 – 1555 or later), of Totnes and Great Englebourne, Devon, was an English politician.

He was a member (MP) of the parliament of England for Totnes in March 1553 and October 1553.
