= Leonard Yeo =

16th-century English politician

Leonard Yeo (by 1512 – 30 May 1586), of London and Totnes, Devon, was an English politician.

He was a member (MP) of the parliament of England for Totnes in 1555, 1558 and 1559.
