= Richard Rodd =

English politician

Richard Rodd (died before 1633) of Totnes, Devon and Rodd, Herefordshire was a politician.

He was a member (MP) of the parliament of England for Totnes in 1621. He was Mayor of Totnes in 1612–13.
