= Thomas Mills (MP) =

British politician

Member of Parliament for Totnes
- In office 8 July 1852 – 11 November 1862 Serving with George Hay (1855–1862); Edward Seymour (1852–1855)
- Preceded by: Charles Barry Baldwin; Edward Seymour
- Succeeded by: John Pender; George Hay

Personal details
- Born: 1794 Middlesex, England
- Died: 11 November 1862 (aged 67–68)
- Party: Liberal
- Other political affiliations: Whig
- Parent(s): Samuel Mills; Mary Wilson

Thomas Mills (1794 – 11 November 1862) was a British Liberal and Whig politician.

Born in Middlesex, Mills was the eldest son of Samuel Mills and Mary née Wilson. He was admitted to Queens' College, Cambridge in Michaelmas in 1815, graduating with a BA in 1819 and an MA in 1822. He was admitted at the Inner Temple in 1816, and called to the Bar in 1832. After this, he was a Justice of the Peace for Middlesex and Bedfordshire and a Deputy Lieutenant of Hampshire.

Mills was first elected Whig MP for Totnes at the 1852 general election and, becoming a Liberal in 1859, held the seat until his death in 1862.

Parliament of the United Kingdom
Preceded by Edward Seymour; Charles Barry Baldwin	Member of Parliament for Totnes; 1852–1860; With: George Hay (1855–1862); Edward Seymour (1852–1855)	Succeeded by John Pender; George Hay
