= John Eveleigh =

John Eveleigh may refer to:

- John Eveleigh (architect), English surveyor and architect
- John Eveleigh (Oriel), English churchman and academic, Provost of Oriel College, Oxford
- John Eveleigh (MP), English politician
- John Eveleigh (priest), Dean of Ross, Ireland, 1639–1664
