= Leonard Darr =

English politician

Leonard Darr (c. 1554–1615), a merchant by profession, was a member (MP) of the Parliament of England for Totnes in 1601. He was previously Mayor of Totnes from 1593 to 1594. In 1602 He retired to South Pool and died there in March 1615.

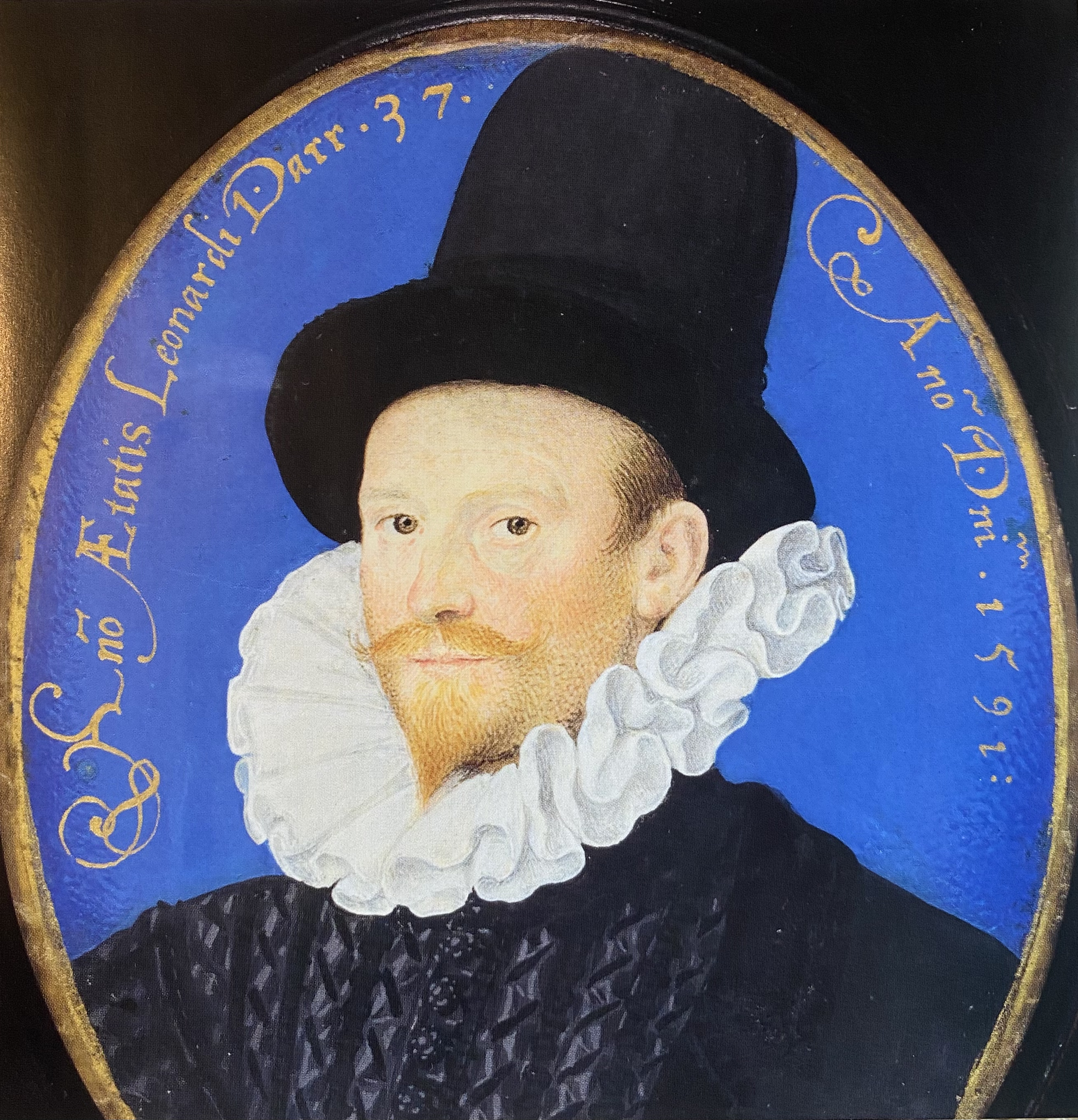
Leonard Darr in 1591 at age 37 years. Painting by Nicholas Hilliard (1547–1619)
