= Plummer Lake (Idaho) =

Alpine lake in the state of Idaho

- Location within Idaho Location within the United States
- Location: Elmore County, Idaho
- Coordinates: 43°57′06″N 115°04′53″W
- Type: Glacial
- Primary outflows: Queens River to Middle Fork Boise River
- Basin countries: United States
- Max. length: 0.19 mi (0.31 km)
- Max. width: 0.12 mi (0.19 km)
- Surface elevation: 8,590 ft (2,620 m)

Plummer Lake is a small alpine lake in Elmore County, Idaho, United States, located in the Sawtooth Mountains in the Sawtooth National Recreation Area. The lake is accessed from Sawtooth National Forest trail 007 via trail 458 along Benedict Creek.

Plummer Lake is in the Sawtooth Wilderness, and a wilderness permit can be obtained at a registration box at trailheads or wilderness boundaries. Everly Lake is 0.15 mi (0.24 km) north of Plummer Lake, although Everly Lake is in the Payette River drainage.

== See also ==
- List of lakes of the Sawtooth Mountains (Idaho)
- Sawtooth National Forest
- Sawtooth National Recreation Area
- Sawtooth Range (Idaho)
