= William Burlestone =

14th-century English politician

William Burlestone or Borleston (died 1406), of Harberton, Devon, was an English politician.

He was a member (MP) of the Parliament of England for Totnes in January 1377, October 1377, January 1380, 1381, February 1383; and for Plympton Erle in 1381; for Dartmouth in October 1382, February 1383, November 1384, 1385 and February 1388.
