= Ellis Beare =

English politician

Ellis Beare (fl. 1382–1397), of Nether Exe, Devon, was an English politician.

He was a Member (MP) of the Parliament of England for Barnstaple in October 1382, November 1384, for Plympton Erle in February 1383, April 1384 and February 1388 and for Totnes in 1385, 1395 and January 1397.
