= Ray Mawby =

British politician (1922–1990)

Raymond Llewellyn Mawby (6 February 1922 – 22 July 1990) was a British Member of Parliament for the Conservative Party and a junior Minister, who was in the pay of 2nd Directorate of the General Staff of the Czechoslovak People's Army, the military intelligence service of the Czechoslovak Socialist Republic.

== Early life and political career ==
Mawby was educated at Long Lawford school. He worked as an electrician, and entered politics through his involvement with trade unionism. He was an official in the Rugby branch of the Electrical Trades Union and became the first president of the Conservative Trade Unionists' national advisory committee.

Mawby was a Rugby Borough councillor in 1952. In 1954 he was present in a delegation to Cairo when Gamal Abdel Nasser gained power in a coup, and was the first foreign politician to officially meet him.

He became Member of Parliament for Totnes in 1955, and was assistant Postmaster General from 1963 to 1964. Mawby actively campaigned against legalising male homosexual acts. His constituency was abolished in 1983 and he failed to win selection in either of its successor seats, South Hams and Teignbridge.

== "Laval" ==
Following access by the BBC to previously secret files held by the current Czech Republic security services, it was revealed on 28 June 2012 that Mawby, who was given the code name "Laval", had spied for the Czechoslovak Socialist Republic during the Cold War. He received £100 (equivalent to £2,690 in 2023) per nugget of information, and even signed a receipt for one payment. He handed over handwritten floor plans of the Prime Minister's office in the House of Commons, and details of who provided security at the office. He also promised to ask questions in the House on behalf of his paymasters.

During the decade that Mawby supplied information he handed over lists of parliamentary committees, and details about his fellow politicians, including a supposedly confidential parliamentary investigation into a Conservative peer. Meetings sometimes took place three or four times in a month, although this greatly decreased by the end of the 1960s, and ended completely in November 1971.

There is no indication in MI5's authorised history that they knew of Mawby's spying activities, and he is the only Conservative MP known to have spied for a Communist government.

== See also ==
- Institute for the Study of Totalitarian Regimes
- John Stonehouse

== References and sources ==
Sources

- Times Guide to the House of Commons 1979
- Leigh Rayment's Historical List of MPs

Parliament of the United Kingdom
Preceded by Ralph Rayner	Member of Parliament for Totnes; 1955 – 1983	Constituency abolished
