= Jim Pomeroy =

Jim Pomeroy may refer to:

- Jim Pomeroy (motorcyclist) (1952–2006), professional motocross racer
- Jim Pomeroy (politician) (born 1936), North Dakota Democratic-NPL Party member of the North Dakota Senate
- Jim Pomeroy (artist) (1945–1992), American artist
