= Henry Chesewell =

English politician

Henry Chesewell (died 1433), of Totnes, Devon, was an English politician. Outside of politics, he is believed to have been a shopkeeper dealing in victuals.

He was a member (MP) of the parliament of England for Totnes in December 1421 and 1422.
