= John Sebright =

John Sebright may refer to:

- John Sebright (Totnes MP), English Member of Parliament for Totnes in 1413
- Sir John Sebright, 6th Baronet (1725–1794), British Army general
- Sir John Sebright, 7th Baronet (1767–1846), British politician and landowner, son of the above
