= William Adams (1752–1811) =

British merchant and politician

William Adams (30 September 1752 – 21 September 1811) was a British merchant and Tory politician.

He was the eldest son of William Adams of Totnes, Devon. He was made Mayor of Totnes for 1780–81, 1788–89 and 1797–98 and served as town Recorder from 1807 to 1811.

He was elected as the member of parliament (MP) for Plympton Erle in 1796. He resigned that seat to be elected MP for Totnes in Devon, his native town, at a by-election in June 1801, and was returned unopposed to the House of Commons at the next three general elections, holding the seat until his death in 1811 at the age of 58.

He married Anna Maria Dacres in 1774. She was a daughter of Richard Dacres of Leatherhead, Surrey and wet nurse to Princess Amelia, and by her he had two sons and two daughters. In 1810 he was living in Bowden House, Ashprington, near Totnes, which he had purchased from the Trist family in about 1800.

Parliament of the United Kingdom
Preceded by William Manning; Philip Metcalfe	Member of Parliament for Plympton Erle; 1796–1800; With: William Mitchell 1796–99; Richard Hankey from 1799	Succeeded by Parliament of the United Kingdom
Parliament of the United Kingdom
Preceded by Parliament of Great Britain	Member of Parliament for Plympton Erle; January 1801 – July 1801; With: Richard Hankey	Succeeded by Richard Hankey; Lord Glenbervie
Preceded by Lord George Seymour-Conway; The Lord Arden	Member of Parliament for Totnes; 1801–1811; With: The Lord Arden to 1802; John Berkeley Burland 1802–1804; Vicary Gibbs 1804–1806; Benjamin Hall from 1806	Succeeded by Thomas Courtenay; Benjamin Hall
