= Charles Barry Baldwin =

United Kingdom Member of Parliament

Member of Parliament for Totnes
- In office 21 April 1840 – 8 July 1852 Serving with Edward Seymour
- Preceded by: Charles Barry Baldwin; Edward Seymour; William Blount
- Succeeded by: Edward Seymour; Thomas Mills
- In office 26 July 1839 – 8 April 1840 Serving with Edward Seymour; William Blount
- Preceded by: Jasper Parrott; Edward Seymour
- Succeeded by: Edward Seymour; Charles Barry Baldwin
- In office 2 August 1830 – 11 December 1832 Serving with Thomas Courtenay
- Preceded by: Henry Vane; Thomas Courtenay
- Succeeded by: Jasper Parrott; James Cornish

Personal details
- Born: c. 1789
- Died: 13 April 1859 (aged 69) Paris, France
- Party: Conservative
- Other political affiliations: Tory
- Spouse: Frances Lydia Boyd (m. 1823; sep. 1854)
- Parent: Charles Baldwin

Charles Barry Baldwin (c. 1789 – 13 April 1859) was a British Conservative and Tory politician.

The son of Charles Baldwin, descendant of Trinity College, Dublin provost Richard Baldwin, and nephew of Sir Edward Barry, Baldwin's early career saw him hold the role of Undersecretary to the French claims commission in 1819, and then called to the Bar with Inner Temple in 1824. By 1830, he was a conveyancer, and by 1835, he was a parliamentary draftsmen and counsel to the French claims commissioners. He married Frances Lydia Boyd, daughter of Walter Boyd and Harriet Anne née Goddard, in 1823, and they had one son and two daughters: Charles Edward Barry (born 1824); Frances Elizabeth (1826–1891); and Mary Georgiana (c. 1837–1898). They later separated after his wife was granted a separation in 1854.

After unsuccessfully contesting the seat in 1826, Baldwin was first elected Tory MP for Totnes at the 1830 general election, but stood down at the 1832 election. During this period of his parliamentary career, he was listed by ministers as a 'friend', although he voted against the Reform Act 1832.

He stood again for the seat at a by-election in 1839–caused by the resignation of Jasper Parrott–and secured the same number of votes as his only rival William Blount, resulting in a double return. However, after an election petition was submitted and reviewed, the election was declared void in April 1840, with a committee deciding that not enough notice of the poll had been given. In the resulting by-election, Baldwin was again elected, and then held the seat as a 'free trade Conservative' until 1852 when he was defeated.

Parliament of the United Kingdom
Preceded by Jasper Parrott; Edward Seymour; William Blount	Member of Parliament for Totnes; 1840–1852; With: Edward Seymour	Succeeded by Edward Seymour; Thomas Mills
Preceded by Jasper Parrott; Edward Seymour	Member of Parliament for Totnes; 1839–1840; With: Edward Seymour; William Blount	Succeeded by Edward Seymour; Charles Barry Baldwin
Preceded by Earl of Darlington; Thomas Courtenay	Member of Parliament for Totnes; 1830–1832; With: Thomas Courtenay	Succeeded by Jasper Parrott; James Cornish
