= Christopher Savery =

16th-century English politician

Christopher Savery (by 1502 – 18 April 1560), of Totnes, Devon, was an English politician.

He was a member (MP) of the parliament of England for Totnes in March 1553, October 1553 and November 1554. He was Mayor of Totnes in 1535–1537, 1548–49 and 1556–57.
