= Walter Serle =

English politician

Walter Serle (fl. 1420) of Totnes, Devon, was an English politician.

He was a member (MP) of the parliament of England for Totnes in 1420.
