= Everleigh =

Everleigh may refer to:

== Places ==
- Everleigh, Wiltshire, a village in England

== People ==
- Kate Everleigh (1864–1926), Anglo-American actress

== Other ==
- The Everleigh Club, an early 20th-century Chicago brothel owned by the sisters Ada and Minna Everleigh
  - The Everleigh sisters

== See also ==
- Eveleigh (disambiguation)
- Everly (disambiguation)
