= Richard Savery =

16th-century English politician

Member of the England Parliament for Totnes
- In office 1554

Personal details
- Born: 1503
- Died: 1572 (aged 68–69)

Richard Savery (by 1503 – 4 February 1572), of Totnes and Staverton, Devon, was an English politician.

He was a Member of Parliament (MP) of the Parliament of England for Totnes in November 1554.
