= Philip Holditch =

Member of the Parliament of England

Philip Holditch (died c. 1608), of Totnes and Blackawton, Devon, was an English merchant and politician.

He was elected Mayor of Totnes for 1598–99 and a member (MP) of the parliament of England for Totnes in 1601.

He married Susanna Crossing and had at least 4 sons and 4 daughters. His eldest son Philip, was also Mayor and MP for Totnes.
