= Ralph Rayner =

British politician

Brigadier Sir Ralph Herbert Rayner MBE (13 January 1896 – 17 July 1977) was a British Conservative Party politician.

Rayner was commissioned into the Duke of Wellington's Regiment, in which he served as a signals officer. He was seconded to the Royal Flying Corps in 1916. During the First World War he served on the Western Front and India. He was seconded to the Indian Army in 1917, transferred in January 1919 and served in the Third Afghan War, for which he was made a Member of the Order of the British Empire. He transferred to the Royal Corps of Signals in 1926. Between July 1928 and January 1930 he was ADC to the Marquess of Willingdon, Governor General of Canada. He was promoted captain in 1919, major in 1932 and retired in 1933. He then entered politics and was Member of Parliament (MP) for Totnes from 1935 to 1955. He rejoined the Army during the Second World War and reached the rank of brigadier.

He was made deputy lieutenant of Devon in 1952, knighted in 1956, and became High Sheriff of Devon in 1958. He married a member of the Courtauld family, textile magnates.

In 1932, he acquired the 2,500 acre Ashcombe estate in Devon, still owned by his descendants, where in 1935 he built as his residence Ashcombe Tower House, situated on a spur of Little Haldon above the stream known as the Dawlish Water, so named after the tower built there in 1833 as an observatory. Brian O'Rorke was chosen as the architect for the project on the grounds that he had never designed such a house before and would therefore be open to Lady Rayner's ideas. At Ashcombe Tower, the Arts and Crafts style meets Art Deco.

As one of the first British officers to enter Adolf Hitler's Berlin bunker, the Führerbunker, in the Second World War, Rayner was given a red telephone as a souvenir by Soviet soldiers and used it at Ashcombe Tower. The Bakelite phone has an engraved swastika and the name Adolf Hitler.

Parliament of the United Kingdom
Preceded by Samuel Harvey	Member of Parliament for Totnes; 1935–1955	Succeeded by Ray Mawby
