= William Eveleigh =

Irish organ player (1868–1950)

William George Eveleigh
- Born: May 11, 1868; Meerut, India
- Died: January 13, 1950 (aged 81); Bristol, England
- Occupation: Organist

William George Eveleigh (11 May 1868 – 13 January 1950) was an English organist known for his work at Saint Finbarre's Cathedral in Cork, Ireland. Eveleigh was born in Meerut, India, the son of F.C. Henry Eveleigh, a Captain in the Royal Horse Artillery. Educated at Cranleigh and Peterhouse Cambridge, he gained his doctorate in music at Queen's College, Oxford in 1895. In 1894, he married Louise, daughter of Major F. Goldhurst, of Upton Park, Slough. They had four children. He held appointments at Bramley, Hampshire; Holywell, North Wales; and the Holy Trinity Episcopal church, Ayr Scotland, before being appointed choirmaster and organist at St. Fin Barre's Cathedral, Cork in 1903., succeeding John Christopher Marks. He remained in Cork until 1922, being succeeded by his pupil Jonathan Thomas Horne who continued in the post until 1977. In addition to church music and instrumental pieces, Eveleigh composed a five-act opera entitled The Valkyrie. He retired to England in 1922, and died at the Rosehill Nursing Home in Bristol in 1950.
