= Samuel Harvey (politician) =

British politician (1885–1959)

Major Sir Samuel Emile Harvey DL (7 December 1885 – 9 November 1959) was a British Conservative Party politician. He sat in the House of Commons for all but one of the years from 1922 to 1935.

== Early life ==
Harvey was born in Cornwall to Sir Robert Harvey, a Cornish businessman who had struck it rich in the nitrate business in Chile, and Robert's wife Alida Marie Godefroy, a Franco-Peruvian lady whom Robert had married while working in Iquique during the time of the War of the Pacific and the transfer of that area from Peruvian to Chilean control.

He was educated at Eton until 1902, and in 1905 he joined the 1st King's Dragoon Guards. He was with the regiment in India when World War I began. The Dragoon Guards arrived in to France in November 1914, and soon mounted a cavalry charge, one of the few in that war. The unit was gassed and Harvey's health never recovered.

== Career ==
Harvey was elected at 1922 general election as the Member of Parliament (MP) for Totnes, after the retirement of the long-serving MP Francis Mildmay. He was narrowly defeated at the 1923 general election by the Liberal Party candidate Henry Harvey Vivian, but ousted Vivian at the 1924 general election and held the seat until he retired from the Commons at the 1935 general election.

It was announced in the 1935 New Year Honours list that Harvey was to be knighted, "for political and public services". The title was conferred at a ceremony in Buckingham Palace on 21 February 1935.

After leaving the Commons, he lived in Sidmouth in Devon, becoming a justice of the peace (JP) and in 1938 a deputy lieutenant of Devon. 1941 Harvey was the High Sheriff of Devon.

Harvey died intestate on 9 November 1959, aged 73. A memorial service for him was held in Totnes Parish Church on 16 November 1959.

== Sources ==
- bio on Robert Harvey
- list of members of the House of Commons for constituencies beginning with the letter T
- Pugsley, David, list of High Sheriffs of Devon since 1832

Parliament of the United Kingdom
Preceded by Francis Mildmay	Member of Parliament for Totnes; 1922 – 1923	Succeeded by Henry Vivian
Preceded by Henry Vivian	Member of Parliament for Totnes; 1924 – 1935	Succeeded by Ralph Rayner
