= Everly Lake =

Alpine lake in the state of Idaho

- Location within Idaho Location within the United States
- Location: Boise County, Idaho
- Coordinates: 43°57′20″N 115°05′01″W
- Lake type: Glacial
- Primary outflows: Benedict Creek to South Fork Payette River
- Basin countries: United States
- Max. length: 0.29 mi (0.47 km)
- Max. width: 0.12 mi (0.19 km)
- Surface elevation: 8,650 ft (2,640 m)

Everly Lake is a small alpine lake in Boise County, Idaho, United States, located in the Sawtooth Mountains in the Sawtooth National Recreation Area. The lake is accessed from Sawtooth National Forest trail 007 from trail 458.

Everly Lake is in the Sawtooth Wilderness, and a wilderness permit can be obtained at a registration box at trailheads or wilderness boundaries. Plummer Lake is over the pass to the southeast of Everly Lake.

== See also ==
- List of lakes of the Sawtooth Mountains (Idaho)
- Sawtooth National Forest
- Sawtooth National Recreation Area
- Sawtooth Range (Idaho)
