= Ralph Pomeroy =

Ralph Pomeroy may refer to:

- Ralph Pomeroy (gynecologist) (1867–1925), American gynecologist
- Ralph Pomeroy (poet) (1926–1999), American poet
- Ralph E. Pomeroy (1930–1952), recipient of the Medal of Honor

== See also ==
- Ralph de Pomeroy, 11th-century English landowner
