= Henry Gildon =

16th-century English politician

Henry Gildon (by 1533 – 1592 or later), of Totnes, Devon, was an English politician.

He was a member (MP) of the parliament of England for Totnes in April 1554.
