= Totnes (constituency) =

UK Parliament constituency (1997–2024)

- Former county constituency for the House of Commons
- Boundary of Totnes in Devon

- Location of Devon within England
- County: Devon
- Electorate: 67,562 (December 2010)
- Major settlements: Totnes, Dartmouth, Kingsbridge, Salcombe and Brixham

1997–2024
- Seats: One
- Created from: South Hams
- Replaced by: South Devon

1885–1983
- Seats: One
- Type of constituency: County constituency
- Created from: South Devon
- Replaced by: Teignbridge and South Hams

1295–1868
- Seats: Two
- Type of constituency: Borough constituency
- Replaced by: Devon Southern

Totnes was a parliamentary constituency (Note: A county constituency (for the purposes of election expenses and type of returning officer)) in Devon represented in the House of Commons of the UK Parliament. (Note: As with all constituencies, the constituency elects one Member of Parliament (MP) by the first past the post system of election at least every five years.)

Under the 2023 Periodic Review of Westminster constituencies, the constituency name was abolished. With to minor boundary changes, it was renamed South Devon at the 2024 general election.

== History ==
An original parliamentary borough of Totnes or Totness was created in 1295. It returned two MPs to the House of Commons of England until 1707, then to the House of Commons of Great Britain until 1800, and finally to the House of Commons of the United Kingdom from 1801 until it was abolished under the Representation of the People Act 1867 with effect from the 1868 election. The constituency was reformed in 1885, in a much narrower form than previously.

It was abolished again at the 1983, largely replaced by the South Hams constituency. In 1997, South Hams was abolished and largely replaced by the reformed Totnes. At the 2024 general election, the name Totnes disappeared once again, as the constituency was renamed South Devon constituency with minor boundary changes.

=== Political history ===
The constituency was a generally safe seat for the Conservative Party since the 1920s; it returned a Conservative MP at every general election for which it existed since 1924 (as did South Hams, the constituency that replaced it between 1983 and 1997), though it came close to falling to the Liberal Democrats in 1997, 2001 and 2005.

Its Conservative MP from 2010, Dr Sarah Wollaston, defected to the Liberal Democrats in 2019, after a brief spell as an independent, and prior to that as a member of Change UK, a new party formed from MPs formerly Conservative or Labour, after she became disillusioned with the Conservative Party's position on Brexit. She came second to a new Conservative candidate in 2019.

During the 2016 EU Referendum, Totnes is estimated to have narrowly voted to Leave, by 53.9% vs. 46.1% Remain. Although the town of Totnes itself is a Remain stronghold, the larger town of Brixham and the rural areas of the constituency voted in favour of Brexit.

== Boundaries ==
Map of boundaries 2010−2024

1885–1918: The Municipal Borough of Totnes, and the Sessional Divisions of Ermington and Plympton, and Stanborough and Coleridge.

1918–1950: The Municipal Borough of Totnes, the Urban Districts of Ashburton, Buckfastleigh, Kingsbridge, Newton Abbot, Salcombe, and Teignmouth, the Rural District of Kingsbridge, and parts of the Rural Districts of Newton Abbot and Totnes.

1950–1974: The Municipal Boroughs of Clifton, Dartmouth, Hardness, and Totnes, the Urban Districts of Ashburton, Buckfastleigh, Kingsbridge, Newton Abbot, and Salcombe, the Rural Districts of Kingsbridge and Newton Abbot, and part of the Rural District of Totnes.

1974–1983: The Municipal Boroughs of Clifton, Dartmouth, Hardness, and Totnes, the Urban Districts of Ashburton, Buckfastleigh, Kingsbridge, Newton Abbot, and Salcombe, and the Rural Districts of Kingsbridge, Newton Abbot, and Totnes.

1997–2010: The District of South Hams wards of Avon and Harbourne, Avonleigh, Dartington, Dartmouth Clifton, Dartmouth Hardness, Dart Valley, Eastmoor, Garabrook, Kingsbridge, Kingswear, Malborough, Marldon, Salcombe, Saltstone, Skerries, South Brent, Stoke Gabriel, Stokenham, Thurlestone, Totnes, Totnes Bridgetown, and West Dart, the Borough of Torbay wards of Blatchcombe, Furzeham with Churston, and St Peter's with St Mary's, and the District of Teignbridge wards of Ambrook, Ashburton, and Buckfastleigh.

2010–2024: The District of South Hams wards of Allington and Loddiswell, Avon and Harbourne, Dartington, Dartmouth and Kingswear, Dartmouth Townstal, East Dart, Eastmoor, Kingsbridge East, Kingsbridge North, Marldon, Salcombe and Malborough, Saltstone, Skerries, South Brent, Stokenham, Thurlestone, Totnes Bridgetown, Totnes Town, West Dart, and Westville and Alvington, and the Borough of Torbay wards of Berry Head with Furzeham, Blatchcombe, Churston with Galmpton, and St Mary's with Summercombe.

The Totnes constituency covered the eastern part of the South Hams district of Devon, including the towns of Totnes, Dartmouth, Kingsbridge and Salcombe, as well as parts of the unitary authority of Torbay, including the town of Brixham.

== Constituency profile ==
Post-1997 recreation, the seat was divided between the South Hams and Torbay council areas, with around 60% of the electorate residing in the former and 40% in the latter in its final form after the 2010 boundary changes.

Despite the name of the constituency, the largest town in it was not Totnes but Brixham, a fishing port in the Torbay portion of the seat of around 17,000 people. Totnes itself, a market town in South Hams of around 9,000 renowned for its alternative and "New Age" community, accounted for only around 10% of the voters in the constituency bearing its name.

The seat also included the South Hams towns of Kingsbridge, Salcombe and Dartmouth, as well as the western suburbs of the Torbay town of Paignton, most of which belonged to the Torbay constituency.

Much of the constituency was rural, taking in numerous villages in the picturesque South Hams district as well as the Torbay village of Churston.

Workless claimants, registered jobseekers, were in November 2012 significantly lower than the national average of 3.8%, at 2.4% of the population based on a statistical compilation by The Guardian.

== Members of Parliament ==
=== MPs 1295–1660 ===
Constituency created 1295

- Many of the names missing from this list 1295-1714 can be found in Notitia Parliamentaria: or, an history of the counties, cities, and boroughs in England and Wales. ... By Browne Willis, ... 1715: Vol 2, pp.281-285.

| Parliament | First member | Second member |
|---|---|---|
| 1295 | Johannes de Blakedon | |
| 1362 | Richard Whitelegh | |
| 1366 | John Prescott | |
| 1372 | John Prescott | |
| 1373 | John Prescott | |
| 1377 (Jan) | William Burlestone | |
| 1377 (Oct) | William Burlestone | |
| 1380 (Jan) | William Burlestone | |
| 1381 | William Burlestone | |
| 1383 (Feb) | William Burlestone | |
| 1386 | Robert French | John Pasford |
| 1388 (Feb) | John Row | Walter Browning |
| 1388 (Sep) | John Statham | Walter Browning |
| 1390 (Jan) | John Poltimore | Walter Hotot |
| 1390 (Nov) | | |
| 1391 | John Grey | Thomas Norris |
| 1393 | John Suell | Robert Barneburgh |
| 1394 | Richard Whitelegh | John Pasford |
| 1395 | Ellis Beare | John Marshall |
| 1397 (Jan) | John Gunne | Ellis Beare |
| 1397 (Sep) | | |
| 1399 | Simon Marsh | John Rose |
| 1401 | | |
| 1402 | Henry Spencer | John Hulle |
| 1404 (Jan) | | |
| 1404 (Oct) | | |
| 1406 | Robert Wastell | John Warwick |
| 1407 | Alfred Wonston | Sir John Pomeroy |
| 1410 | Henry Austin | Robert Wastell |
| 1411 | John Bosom | Henry Bremeler |
| 1413 (Feb) | | |
| 1413 (May) | John Sebright | Henry Austin |
| 1414 (Apr) | | |
| 1414 (Nov) | William Ryder | Henry Berkeley |
| 1415 | | |
| 1416 (Mar) | | |
1416 (Oct)
| 1417 | | |
| 1419 | | |
| 1420 | John Ash | Walter Serle |
| 1421 (May) | Henry Berkeley | Thomas Kirkby |
| 1421 (Dec) | Henry Chesewell | William Cosyn |
| 1449 | Adam Cokkys | Johannes Prall |
| 1450 | Johannes Hobbys | Thomas Calwodeley |
| 1455 | William Fowell of Fowelscombe | |
| 1472 | William Hody | |
| 1491 | Lewis Pollard | |
| 1510-1523 | No names known | |
| 1529 | John Giles | Adam Ralegh |
| 1536 | ? | |
| 1539 | ? | |
| 1542 | ? | |
| 1545 | Roger Prideaux | John Gale |
| 1547 | Roger Prideaux | Edmund Sture |
| 1553 (Mar) | John Wotton | Christopher Savery |
| 1553 (Oct) | John Wotton | Christopher Savery |
| 1554 (Apr) | John Eveleigh | Henry Gildon |
| 1554 (Nov) | Richard Savery | Christopher Savery |
| 1555 | Peter Edgecombe | Leonard Yeo |
| 1558 | Bernard Smith | Leonard Yeo |
| 1558–9 | Leonard Yeo | Sir Nicholas Poyntz |
| 1562–3 | Sir Arthur Champernowne | Richard Edgecombe I |
| 1571 | Richard Hurleston | John Stanhope |
| 1572 | Robert Monson, made judge and repl. 1576 by Robert Beale | Edward Buggin |
| 1584 | Christopher Savery | Nicholas Ball |
| 1586 | John Giles | Nicholas Hayman |
| 1588 | Richard Edgecombe | Simon Kelway |
| 1593 | Richard Sparry | Christopher Savery |
| 1597 | Edward Giles | Christopher Buggin |
| 1601 | Leonard Darr | Philip Holditch |
| 1604 | Christopher Brocking | Walter Dollings |
| 1614 | Nathaniel Rich | Lawrence Adams |
| 1621–1622 | Sir Edward Giles | Richard Rodd |
| 1624 | Arthur Champernoun | Sir Edward Giles |
| 1625 | Sir Edward Seymour, 2nd Baronet | Sir Edward Giles |
| 1626 | Arthur Champernoun | Philip Holditch |
| 1628–1629 | Sir Edward Giles | Thomas Prestwood |
| 1629–1640 | No Parliaments summoned | |
| Apr 1640 | Oliver St John | John Maynard |
| Nov 1640 | Oliver St John | John Maynard |
| 1645 | Oliver St John | John Maynard |
| 1648 | Oliver St John | John Maynard |
| 1653 | Totnes not represented in Barebone's Parliament | |
| 1654 | Major-General Desborough | (one seat only) |
| 1656 | Christopher Maynard | (one seat only) |
| 1659 | Capt. John Pleydell | Gilbert Evelyn |

=== MPs 1660–1868 ===
Two members

| Year | First member | First party | Second member | Second party |
|---|---|---|---|---|
| 1660 | Thomas Chafe | | Thomas Clifford | |
| 1661 | Sir Edward Seymour, 3rd Baronet | Tory | Thomas Clifford | |
| 1673 | Sir Edward Seymour, 3rd Baronet | Tory | Sir Thomas Berry | |
| Feb 1679 | Sir Edward Seymour, 3rd Baronet | Tory | John Kelland | |
| Aug 1679 | Sir Edward Seymour, 3rd Baronet | Tory | Edward Seymour (later 4th Baronet) | Tory |
| 1681 | Charles Kelland | | John Kelland | |
| 1685 | Sir Edward Seymour, 3rd Baronet | Tory | John Kelland | |
| 1689 | Rawlin Mallock | | Sir John Fowell, Bt | |
| 1690 | Henry Seymour Portman | | Sir John Fowell, Bt | |
| 1692 | Henry Seymour Portman | | Thomas Coulson | |
| 1695 | Sir Edward Seymour, 4th Baronet | Tory | Edward Yarde | |
| 1698 | Sir Edward Seymour, 4th Baronet | Tory | Thomas Coulson | |
| 1699 | Francis Gwyn | | Thomas Coulson | |
| 1701 | Sir Christopher Musgrave, Bt | | Thomas Coulson | |
| 1702 | William Seymour | Tory | Thomas Coulson | |
| 1705 | Sir Humphrey Mackworth | Tory | Thomas Coulson | |
| 1708 | Sir Edward Seymour, 5th Baronet | Tory | George Courtenay | |
| 1710 | Thomas Coulson | | Francis Gwyn | |
| 1713 | Stephen Northleigh | | Francis Gwyn | |
| 1715 | Stephen Northleigh | | Arthur Champernowne | |
| 1717 | Stephen Northleigh | | Sir John Germain, Bt | |
| 1718 | Stephen Northleigh | | Sir Charles Wills | |
| 1722 | Joseph Banks | | Sir Charles Wills | |
| 1727 | Exton Sayer | | Sir Charles Wills | |
| 1732 | Sir Henry Gough, Bt | | Sir Charles Wills | |
| 1734 | Sir Joseph Danvers, Bt | | Sir Charles Wills | |
| 1742 | Sir Joseph Danvers, Bt | | John Strange | Whig |
| 1747 | Charles Taylor | | John Strange | Whig |
| Apr 1754 | Browse Trist | | John Strange | Whig |
| Dec 1754 | Browse Trist | | Sir Richard Lloyd | |
| 1759 | Browse Trist | | Richard Savage Lloyd | |
| 1763 | Henry Seymour | | Richard Savage Lloyd | |
| 1768 | Sir Philip Jennings-Clerke, Bt | | Peter Burrell | |
| 1774 | Sir Philip Jennings-Clerke, Bt | | James Amyatt | |
| 1780 | Sir Philip Jennings-Clerke, Bt | | Launcelot Brown | |
| 1784 | Sir Philip Jennings-Clerke, Bt | | The Hon. Henry Phipps | Tory |
| 1788 | Viscount Barnard | Whig | The Hon. Henry Phipps | Tory |
| 1790 | William Powlett Powlett | | Sir Francis Buller Yarde, Bt | |
| 1796 | The Lord Arden | | Lord George Seymour | |
| 1801 | The Lord Arden | | William Adams | Tory |
| 1802 | John Berkeley Burland | | William Adams | Tory |
| 1804 | Vicary Gibbs | Tory | William Adams | Tory |
| 1806 | Benjamin Hall | Tory | William Adams | Tory |
| 1811 | Benjamin Hall | Tory | Thomas Courtenay | Tory |
| 1812 | Ayshford Wise | Whig | Thomas Courtenay | Tory |
| 1818 | William Holmes | Tory | Thomas Courtenay | Tory |
| 1820 | John Bent | | Thomas Courtenay | Tory |
| 1826 | The Earl of Darlington | Tory | Thomas Courtenay | Tory |
| 1830 | Charles Barry Baldwin | Tory | Thomas Courtenay | Tory |
| 1832 | Jasper Parrott | Whig | James Cornish | Whig |
| 1835 | Jasper Parrott | Whig | Lord Seymour | Whig |
| 1839 | William Blount (Note: Both Baldwin and Blount received equal votes at the 1839 by-election and were declared elected. However, this was declared void on 8 April 1840 and a by-election was called) (Whig) | Charles Barry Baldwin (Con) | Lord Seymour | Whig |
| 1840 | Charles Barry Baldwin | Conservative | Lord Seymour | Whig |
| 1852 | Thomas Mills | Whig | Lord Seymour | Whig |
| 1855 | Thomas Mills | Whig | The Earl of Gifford | Whig |
| 1859 | Thomas Mills | Liberal | The Earl of Gifford | Liberal |
| 1862 | John Pender | Liberal | The Earl of Gifford | Liberal |
| 1863 | John Pender | Liberal | Alfred Seymour | Liberal |
| 1866 | John Pender declared not duly elected and seat left vacant | | Alfred Seymour | Liberal |
| 1868 | Constituency disenfranchised by the Reform Act 1867 | | | |

=== MPs 1885–1983 ===
One member

| Year | Member | Whip |
|---|---|---|
| 1885 | Francis Mildmay | Liberal |
| 1886 | Francis Mildmay | Liberal Unionist |
| 1912 | Francis Mildmay | Unionist |
| 1922 | Samuel Harvey | Unionist |
| 1923 | Henry Vivian | Liberal |
| 1924 | Samuel Harvey | Unionist |
| 1935 | Ralph Rayner | Conservative |
| 1955 | Ray Mawby | Conservative |
| 1983 | constituency abolished: see South Hams and Teignbridge | |

=== MPs 1997–2024 ===
Between 1983 and 1997 the constituency was replaced by the South Hams constituency. Anthony Steen was returned at every election.

| Election | Member | Party |
|---|---|---|
| 1997 | Anthony Steen | Conservative |
| 2010 | Sarah Wollaston | Conservative |
| 2019 | Sarah Wollaston | Change UK |
| 2019 | Sarah Wollaston | Independent |
| 2019 | Sarah Wollaston | Liberal Democrats |
| 2019 | Anthony Mangnall | Conservative |
| 2024 | constituency abolished: see South Devon | |

== Elections ==
=== Elections in the 2010s ===
General election 2019: Totnes
| Party | Candidate | Votes | % | ±% |
|---|---|---|---|---|
| Conservative | Anthony Mangnall | 27,751 | 53.2 | ▼0.5 |
| Liberal Democrats | Sarah Wollaston | 15,027 | 28.8 | ▲15.9 |
| Labour | Louise Webberley | 8,860 | 17.0 | ▼9.8 |
| Independent | John Kitson | 544 | 1.0 | New |
| Majority | | 12,724 | 24.4 | ▼2.5 |
| Turnout | | 52,182 | 74.7 | ▲1.6 |
| Conservative hold | | Swing | ▼8.2 | |

General election 2017: Totnes
| Party | Candidate | Votes | % | ±% |
|---|---|---|---|---|
| Conservative | Sarah Wollaston | 26,972 | 53.7 | ▲0.7 |
| Labour | Gerrie Messer | 13,495 | 26.8 | ▲14.1 |
| Liberal Democrats | Julian Brazil | 6,466 | 12.9 | ▲3.0 |
| Green | Jacqi Hodgson | 2,097 | 4.2 | ▼6.1 |
| UKIP | Steven Harvey | 1,240 | 2.5 | ▼11.6 |
| Majority | | 13,477 | 26.9 | ▼12.0 |
| Turnout | | 50,353 | 73.1 | ▲4.5 |
| Conservative hold | | Swing | ▼6.7 | |

General election 2015: Totnes
| Party | Candidate | Votes | % | ±% |
|---|---|---|---|---|
| Conservative | Sarah Wollaston | 24,941 | 53.0 | +7.1 |
| UKIP | Justin Haque | 6,656 | 14.1 | +8.1 |
| Labour | Nicky Williams | 5,988 | 12.7 | +5.3 |
| Green | Gill Coombs | 4,845 | 10.3 | +7.8 |
| Liberal Democrats | Julian Brazil | 4,667 | 9.9 | −25.7 |
| Majority | | 18,385 | 38.9 | +28.6 |
| Turnout | | 47,097 | 68.6 | −1.8 |
| Conservative hold | | Swing | | |

General election 2010: Totnes
| Party | Candidate | Votes | % | ±% |
|---|---|---|---|---|
| Conservative | Sarah Wollaston | 21,940 | 45.9 | +3.0 |
| Liberal Democrats | Julian Brazil | 17,013 | 35.6 | −1.5 |
| Labour | Carole Whitty | 3,538 | 7.4 | −4.7 |
| UKIP | Jeffrey Beer | 2,890 | 6.0 | −1.5 |
| Green | Lydia Somerville | 1,181 | 2.5 | New |
| BNP | Mike Turner | 624 | 1.3 | New |
| Independent | Simon Drew | 390 | 0.8 | New |
| Independent | Stephen Hopwood | 267 | 0.6 | New |
| Majority | | 4,927 | 10.3 | +4.5 |
| Turnout | | 47,843 | 70.4 | +0.7 |
| Conservative hold | | Swing | +2.3 | |

=== Elections in the 2000s ===
General election 2005: Totnes
| Party | Candidate | Votes | % | ±% |
|---|---|---|---|---|
| Conservative | Anthony Steen | 21,112 | 41.7 | −2.8 |
| Liberal Democrats | Mike Treleaven | 19,165 | 37.9 | +0.7 |
| Labour | Valerie Burns | 6,185 | 12.2 | 0.0 |
| UKIP | Roger Knapman | 3,914 | 7.7 | +1.6 |
| Independent | Michael Thompson | 199 | 0.4 | New |
| Majority | | 1,947 | 3.8 | −3.5 |
| Turnout | | 50,575 | 67.7 | −0.2 |
| Conservative hold | | Swing | −1.7 | |

General election 2001: Totnes
| Party | Candidate | Votes | % | ±% |
|---|---|---|---|---|
| Conservative | Anthony Steen | 21,914 | 44.5 | +8.0 |
| Liberal Democrats | Rachel Oliver | 18,317 | 37.2 | +2.3 |
| Labour | Thomas Wildy | 6,005 | 12.2 | −4.2 |
| UKIP | Craig Mackinlay | 3,010 | 6.1 | +4.2 |
| Majority | | 3,597 | 7.3 | +5.7 |
| Turnout | | 49,246 | 67.9 | −7.9 |
| Conservative hold | | Swing | | |

=== Elections in the 1990s ===
General election 1997: Totnes
| Party | Candidate | Votes | % | ±% |
|---|---|---|---|---|
| Conservative | Anthony Steen | 19,637 | 36.5 | |
| Liberal Democrats | Rob Chave | 18,760 | 34.9 | |
| Labour | Victor Ellery | 8,796 | 16.4 | |
| Referendum | Pamela Cook | 2,552 | 4.7 | |
| Ind. Conservative | Christopher Venmore | 2,369 | 4.4 | |
| UKIP | H.W. Thomas | 999 | 1.9 | |
| Green | Andy Pratt | 548 | 1.0 | |
| Rainbow Dream Ticket | James Golding | 108 | 0.2 | |
| Majority | | 877 | 1.6 | |
| Turnout | | 53,769 | 75.8 | |
| Conservative win (new seat) | | | | |

=== Elections in the 1970s ===
General election 1979: Totnes
| Party | Candidate | Votes | % | ±% |
|---|---|---|---|---|
| Conservative | Ray Mawby | 35,010 | 52.16 | |
| Liberal | Anthony H. Rogers | 24,445 | 36.42 | |
| Labour Co-op | John Duffin | 7,668 | 11.42 | |
| Majority | | 10,565 | 15.74 | |
| Turnout | | 67,123 | 79.95 | |
| Conservative hold | | Swing | | |

General election October 1974: Totnes
| Party | Candidate | Votes | % | ±% |
|---|---|---|---|---|
| Conservative | Ray Mawby | 27,987 | 45.18 | |
| Liberal | Anthony H. Rogers | 21,586 | 34.85 | |
| Labour | S.M. Spence | 12,366 | 19.96 | |
| Majority | | 6,401 | 10.33 | |
| Turnout | | 61,939 | 76.74 | |
| Conservative hold | | Swing | | |

General election February 1974: Totnes
| Party | Candidate | Votes | % | ±% |
|---|---|---|---|---|
| Conservative | Ray Mawby | 30,565 | 46.93 | |
| Liberal | Anthony H. Rogers | 20,922 | 32.12 | |
| Labour | Harold M. Luscombe | 13,249 | 20.34 | |
| Independent | J. Lewis | 394 | 0.60 | New |
| Majority | | 9,643 | 14.81 | |
| Turnout | | 65,130 | 81.29 | |
| Conservative hold | | Swing | | |

General election 1970: Totnes
| Party | Candidate | Votes | % | ±% |
|---|---|---|---|---|
| Conservative | Ray Mawby | 31,519 | 54.85 | |
| Labour | Robert Blank | 16,429 | 28.59 | |
| Liberal | David Penhaligon | 9,515 | 16.56 | |
| Majority | | 15,090 | 26.26 | |
| Turnout | | 57,463 | 76.67 | |
| Conservative hold | | Swing | | |

=== Elections in the 1960s ===
General election 1966: Totnes
| Party | Candidate | Votes | % | ±% |
|---|---|---|---|---|
| Conservative | Ray Mawby | 25,623 | 47.81 | |
| Labour | Barry Smethurst | 16,900 | 31.54 | |
| Liberal | Paul Tyler | 11,066 | 20.65 | |
| Majority | | 8,723 | 16.27 | |
| Turnout | | 53,589 | 79.43 | |
| Conservative hold | | Swing | | |

General election 1964: Totnes
| Party | Candidate | Votes | % | ±% |
|---|---|---|---|---|
| Conservative | Ray Mawby | 25,417 | 48.64 | |
| Labour | Reginald C.J. Scott | 14,542 | 27.83 | |
| Liberal | Edward B. Taylor | 12,297 | 23.53 | |
| Majority | | 10,875 | 20.81 | |
| Turnout | | 52,256 | 78.83 | |
| Conservative hold | | Swing | | |

=== Elections in the 1950s ===
General election 1959: Totnes
| Party | Candidate | Votes | % | ±% |
|---|---|---|---|---|
| Conservative | Ray Mawby | 26,925 | 53.04 | |
| Labour | Terence J.B. Heelas | 13,116 | 25.84 | |
| Liberal | T. Cedric Jones | 10,719 | 21.12 | |
| Majority | | 13,809 | 27.20 | |
| Turnout | | 50,760 | 80.48 | |
| Conservative hold | | Swing | | |

General election 1955: Totnes
| Party | Candidate | Votes | % | ±% |
|---|---|---|---|---|
| Conservative | Ray Mawby | 26,381 | 52.10 | |
| Labour | Daniel J.P. Mann | 14,787 | 29.20 | |
| Liberal | Arthur Claude Shobbrook | 9,471 | 18.70 | |
| Majority | | 11,594 | 22.90 | |
| Turnout | | 50,639 | 80.75 | |
| Conservative hold | | Swing | | |

General election 1951: Totnes
| Party | Candidate | Votes | % | ±% |
|---|---|---|---|---|
| Conservative | Ralph Rayner | 28,005 | 53.60 | |
| Labour | Charles A. O'Donnell | 16,409 | 31.40 | |
| Liberal | Harold Ernest Desch | 7,838 | 15.00 | |
| Majority | | 11,596 | 22.20 | |
| Turnout | | 52,252 | 82.85 | |
| Conservative hold | | Swing | | |

General election 1950: Totnes
| Party | Candidate | Votes | % | ±% |
|---|---|---|---|---|
| Conservative | Ralph Rayner | 26,104 | 49.01 | |
| Labour | David Widdicombe | 15,767 | 29.60 | |
| Liberal | Harold Ernest Desch | 10,974 | 20.60 | |
| Communist | E. Tapscott | 423 | 0.79 | New |
| Majority | | 10,337 | 19.41 | |
| Turnout | | 53,268 | 84.59 | |
| Conservative hold | | Swing | | |

=== Elections in the 1940s ===
General election 1945: Totnes
| Party | Candidate | Votes | % | ±% |
|---|---|---|---|---|
| Conservative | Ralph Rayner | 24,638 | 51.04 | |
| Labour | J.R. Warde | 16,098 | 33.35 | |
| Liberal | Thomas Henry Aggett | 7,536 | 15.61 | |
| Majority | | 8,540 | 17.69 | |
| Turnout | | 48,092 | 74.57 | |
| Conservative hold | | Swing | | |

=== Elections in the 1930s ===
General Election 1939–40: Another General Election was required to take place before the end of 1940. The political parties had been making preparations for an election to take place and by the Autumn of 1939, the following candidates had been selected;

- Conservative: Ralph Rayner
- Liberal: F Vernon Baxter

General election 1935: Totnes
| Party | Candidate | Votes | % | ±% |
|---|---|---|---|---|
| Conservative | Ralph Rayner | 24,815 | 53.59 | |
| Liberal | Ernest Haylor | 17,639 | 38.10 | |
| Labour | William Roy John Henwood | 3,848 | 8.31 | New |
| Majority | | 7,176 | 15.49 | |
| Turnout | | 46,302 | 79.24 | |
| Conservative hold | | Swing | | |

General election 1931: Totnes
| Party | Candidate | Votes | % | ±% |
|---|---|---|---|---|
| Conservative | Samual Harvey | 26,765 | 56.99 | |
| Liberal | Ernest Haylor | 20,203 | 43.01 | |
| Majority | | 6,562 | 13.98 | |
| Turnout | | 46,968 | 83.41 | |
| Conservative hold | | Swing | | |

=== Elections in the 1920s ===
General election 1929: Totnes
| Party | Candidate | Votes | % | ±% |
|---|---|---|---|---|
| Unionist | Samual Harvey | 21,673 | 47.8 | −5.9 |
| Liberal | Philip Foale Rowsell | 17,790 | 39.3 | −0.9 |
| Labour | Kate Spurrell | 5,828 | 12.9 | +6.8 |
| Majority | | 3,883 | 8.5 | −5.0 |
| Turnout | | 45,291 | 83.1 | −3.0 |
| Unionist hold | | Swing | -2.5 | |

General election 1924: Totnes
| Party | Candidate | Votes | % | ±% |
|---|---|---|---|---|
| Unionist | Samual Harvey | 19,771 | 53.7 | +4.5 |
| Liberal | Henry Vivian | 14,786 | 40.2 | −10.6 |
| Labour | Kate Spurrell | 2,240 | 6.1 | New |
| Majority | | 4,985 | 13.5 | N/A |
| Turnout | | 36,797 | 86.1 | +5.4 |
| Unionist gain from Liberal | | Swing | | |

General election 6 December 1923: Totnes
| Party | Candidate | Votes | % | ±% |
|---|---|---|---|---|
| Liberal | Henry Vivian | 16,845 | 50.8 | +3.2 |
| Unionist | Samual Harvey | 16,343 | 49.2 | −3.2 |
| Majority | | 502 | 1.6 | N/A |
| Turnout | | 33,188 | 80.7 | +2.6 |
| Liberal gain from Unionist | | Swing | +3.2 | |

General election 1922: Totnes
| Party | Candidate | Votes | % | ±% |
|---|---|---|---|---|
| Unionist | Samual Harvey | 16,532 | 52.4 | −6.4 |
| Liberal | Thomas Underdown | 15,032 | 47.6 | +6.4 |
| Majority | | 1,500 | 4.8 | −12.8 |
| Turnout | | 31,564 | 78.1 | +14.2 |
| Unionist hold | | Swing | -6.4 | |

== Election results 1885-1918 ==
=== Elections in the 1910s ===
General election 1918: Totnes
| Party | | Candidate | Votes | % | ±% |
|---|---|---|---|---|---|
| C | Unionist | Francis Mildmay | 14,680 | 58.8 | −4.5 |
| | Liberal | John Cairns (Liberal politician) | 10,266 | 41.2 | +4.5 |
| Majority | | | 4,414 | 17.6 | −9.0 |
| Turnout | | | 24,946 | 63.9 | −18.1 |
| | Unionist hold | | Swing | -4.5 | |
C indicates candidate endorsed by the coalition government.

General Election 1914–15:

Another General Election was required to take place before the end of 1915. The political parties had been making preparations for an election to take place and by July 1914, the following candidates had been selected;

- Unionist: Francis Mildmay
- Liberal: Robert Dunstan

General election December 1910: Totnes
| Party | Candidate | Votes | % | ±% |
|---|---|---|---|---|
| Liberal Unionist | Francis Mildmay | 5,252 | 63.3 | +2.7 |
| Liberal | Robert Dunstan | 3,040 | 36.7 | −2.7 |
| Majority | | 2,212 | 26.6 | +5.4 |
| Turnout | | 8,292 | 82.0 | −7.9 |
| Liberal Unionist hold | | Swing | +2.7 | |

Foot

General election January 1910: Totnes
| Party | Candidate | Votes | % | ±% |
|---|---|---|---|---|
| Liberal Unionist | Francis Mildmay | 5,505 | 60.6 | −2.9 |
| Liberal | Isaac Foot | 3,578 | 39.4 | +2.9 |
| Majority | | 1,927 | 21.2 | −5.8 |
| Turnout | | 9,083 | 89.9 | +2.1 |
| Liberal Unionist hold | | Swing | -2.9 | |

=== Elections in the 1880s ===
Lopes

General election 1885: Totnes
| Party | Candidate | Votes | % | ±% |
|---|---|---|---|---|
| Liberal | Francis Mildmay | 4,389 | 57.4 | |
| Conservative | Henry Lopes | 3,252 | 42.6 | |
| Majority | | 1,137 | 14.8 | |
| Turnout | | 7,641 | 83.2 | |
| Registered electors | | 9,188 | | |
| Liberal win (new seat) | | | | |

Mildmay

General election 1886: Totnes
| Party | Candidate | Votes | % | ±% |
|---|---|---|---|---|
| Liberal Unionist | Francis Mildmay | 4,652 | 80.3 | +37.7 |
| Liberal | Edward Pearce-Edgcumbe | 1,141 | 19.7 | −37.7 |
| Majority | | 3,511 | 60.6 | N/A |
| Turnout | | 5,793 | 63.0 | −20.2 |
| Registered electors | | 9,188 | | |
| Liberal Unionist gain from Liberal | | Swing | +37.7 | |

=== Elections in the 1900s ===
General election 1906: Totnes
| Party | Candidate | Votes | % | ±% |
|---|---|---|---|---|
| Liberal Unionist | Francis Mildmay | 5,226 | 63.5 | N/A |
| Liberal | Lewis Humfrey Edmunds | 2,998 | 36.5 | New |
| Majority | | 2,228 | 27.0 | N/A |
| Turnout | | 8,224 | 87.8 | N/A |
| Registered electors | | 9,370 | | |
| Liberal Unionist hold | | Swing | N/A | |

General election 1900: Totnes
| Party | Candidate | Votes | % | ±% |
|---|---|---|---|---|
| Liberal Unionist | Francis Mildmay | Unopposed | | |
| Liberal Unionist hold | | | | |

=== Elections in the 1890s ===
General election 1895: Totnes
| Party | Candidate | Votes | % | ±% |
|---|---|---|---|---|
| Liberal Unionist | Francis Mildmay | 4,630 | 67.2 | +0.3 |
| Liberal | Alfred John Sparke | 2,264 | 32.8 | −0.3 |
| Majority | | 2,366 | 34.4 | +0.6 |
| Turnout | | 6,894 | 73.1 | −4.6 |
| Registered electors | | 9,431 | | |
| Liberal Unionist hold | | Swing | +0.3 | |

General election 1892: Totnes
| Party | Candidate | Votes | % | ±% |
|---|---|---|---|---|
| Liberal Unionist | Francis Mildmay | 4,815 | 66.9 | −13.4 |
| Liberal | Alfred Herbert Lush | 2,384 | 33.1 | +13.4 |
| Majority | | 2,431 | 33.8 | −26.8 |
| Turnout | | 7,199 | 77.7 | +14.7 |
| Registered electors | | 9,263 | | |
| Liberal Unionist hold | | Swing | -13.4 | |

== Election results 1832-1868 ==
=== Elections in the 1860s ===
General election 1865: Totnes
| Party | Candidate | Votes | % | ±% |
|---|---|---|---|---|
| Liberal | John Pender | 210 | 29.0 | −9.5 |
| Liberal | Alfred Seymour | 204 | 28.2 | −4.3 |
| Conservative | William Gregory Dawkins | 162 | 22.4 | +7.9 |
| Conservative | Bedford Pim | 147 | 20.3 | +5.8 |
| Majority | | 42 | 5.8 | +2.2 |
| Turnout | | 362 (est) | 94.6 (est) | +6.3 |
| Registered electors | | 382 | | |
| Liberal hold | | Swing | −8.2 | |
| Liberal hold | | Swing | −5.6 | |

On petition, Pender was unseated on 22 March 1866. No writ was issued to replace him and, in 1868, the seat was disenfranchised and absorbed into South Devon.

By-election, 20 January 1863: Totnes
| Party | Candidate | Votes | % | ±% |
|---|---|---|---|---|
| Liberal | Alfred Seymour | 165 | 51.2 | −19.8 |
| Conservative | John Dent | 157 | 48.8 | +19.9 |
| Majority | | 8 | 2.4 | −1.2 |
| Turnout | | 322 | 90.2 | +1.9 |
| Registered electors | | 357 | | |
| Liberal hold | | Swing | −19.9 | |

By-election caused by the death of George Hay.

By-election, 9 December 1862: Totnes
| Party | Candidate | Votes | % | ±% |
|---|---|---|---|---|
| Liberal | John Pender | 171 | 97.2 | +26.2 |
| Conservative | John Dent | 5 | 2.8 | −26.1 |
| Majority | | 166 | 94.4 | +90.8 |
| Turnout | | 176 | 49.3 | −39.0 |
| Registered electors | | 357 | | |
| Liberal hold | | Swing | +26.2 | |

By-election caused by the death of Thomas Mills.

=== Elections in the 1850s ===
General election 1859: Totnes
| Party | Candidate | Votes | % | ±% |
|---|---|---|---|---|
| Liberal | George Hay | 180 | 38.5 | +4.0 |
| Liberal | Thomas Mills | 152 | 32.5 | +2.3 |
| Conservative | John Dunn | 135 | 28.9 | −6.4 |
| Majority | | 17 | 3.6 | −2.8 |
| Turnout | | 301 (est) | 88.3 (est) | +4.6 |
| Registered electors | | 341 | | |
| Liberal hold | | Swing | +3.6 | |
| Liberal hold | | Swing | +2.8 | |

General election 1857: Totnes
| Party | Candidate | Votes | % | ±% |
|---|---|---|---|---|
| Whig | George Hay | 171 | 34.5 | −12.6 |
| Whig | Thomas Mills | 150 | 30.2 | +2.6 |
| Peelite | James Thomas Mackenzie | 118 | 23.8 | +11.1 |
| Peelite | John Gregory | 57 | 11.5 | −1.2 |
| Majority | | 32 | 6.4 | +4.1 |
| Turnout | | 248 (est) | 78.7 (est) | −0.8 |
| Registered electors | | 315 | | |
| Whig hold | | Swing | −8.8 | |
| Whig hold | | Swing | −1.2 | |

By-election, 5 November 1855: Totnes
| Party | Candidate | Votes | % | ±% |
|---|---|---|---|---|
| Whig | George Hay | Unopposed | | |
| Whig hold | | | | |

By-election caused by Edward Seymour becoming 12th Duke of Somerset.

General election 1852: Totnes
| Party | Candidate | Votes | % | ±% |
|---|---|---|---|---|
| Whig | Edward Seymour | 263 | 47.1 | −0.6 |
| Whig | Thomas Mills | 154 | 27.6 | +1.5 |
| Conservative | Charles Barry Baldwin | 141 | 25.3 | −0.9 |
| Majority | | 13 | 2.3 | −19.2 |
| Turnout | | 295 (est) | 79.5 (est) | +1.7 |
| Registered electors | | 371 | | |
| Whig hold | | Swing | −0.1 | |
| Whig gain from Conservative | | Swing | +1.0 | |

By-election, 30 March 1850: Totnes
| Party | Candidate | Votes | % | ±% |
|---|---|---|---|---|
| Whig | Edward Seymour | Unopposed | | |
| Whig hold | | | | |

Seymour was appointed Commissioner of Woods, Forests, Land Revenues, Works, and Buildings, requiring a by-election.

=== Elections in the 1840s ===
587

General election 1847: Totnes
| Party | Candidate | Votes | % | ±% |
|---|---|---|---|---|
| Whig | Edward Seymour | 280 | 47.7 | N/A |
| Conservative | Charles Barry Baldwin | 154 | 26.2 | N/A |
| Whig | Samson Ricardo | 153 | 26.1 | N/A |
| Turnout | | 294 (est) | 77.8 (est) | N/A |
| Registered electors | | 378 | | |
| Majority | | 126 | 21.5 | N/A |
| Whig hold | | Swing | N/A | |
| Majority | | 1 | 0.1 | N/A |
| Conservative hold | | Swing | N/A | |

General election 1841: Totnes
| Party | Candidate | Votes | % | ±% |
|---|---|---|---|---|
| Conservative | Charles Barry Baldwin | Unopposed | | |
| Whig | Edward Seymour | Unopposed | | |
| Registered electors | | 391 | | |
| Conservative gain from Whig | | | | |
| Whig hold | | | | |

By-election, 21 April 1840: Totnes
| Party | Candidate | Votes | % | ±% |
|---|---|---|---|---|
| Conservative | Charles Barry Baldwin | 158 | 51.1 | +25.5 |
| Whig | Thomas Guy Gisborne | 151 | 48.9 | −25.5 |
| Majority | | 7 | 2.2 | N/A |
| Turnout | | 309 | 90.6 | +2.5 |
| Registered electors | | 341 | | |
| Conservative gain from Whig | | Swing | +25.5 | |

The previous by-election was declared void on petition, causing a by-election.

=== Elections in the 1830s ===
By-election, 26 July 1839: Totnes
| Party | Candidate | Votes | % | ±% |
|---|---|---|---|---|
| Conservative | Charles Barry Baldwin | 142 | 50.0 | +24.4 |
| Whig | William Blount | 142 | 50.0 | −24.4 |
| Turnout | | 284 | 95.6 | +7.5 |
| Registered electors | | 297 | | |
| Conservative win | | | | |
| Whig win | | | | |

- Caused by Parrott's resignation. This by-election was later declared void.

General election 1837: Totnes
| Party | Candidate | Votes | % |
|---|---|---|---|
| Whig | Edward Seymour | 192 | 40.7 |
| Whig | Jasper Parrott (MP) | 159 | 33.7 |
| Conservative | George Pownall Adams | 121 | 25.6 |
| Majority | | 38 | 8.1 |
| Turnout | | 280 | 88.1 |
| Registered electors | | 318 | |
| Whig hold | | | |
| Whig hold | | | |

By-election, 24 April 1835: Totnes
| Party | Candidate | Votes | % |
|---|---|---|---|
| Whig | Edward Seymour | Unopposed | |
| Whig hold | | | |

- Caused by Seymour's appointment as a Lord Commissioner of the Treasury

General election 1835: Totnes
| Party | Candidate | Votes | % |
|---|---|---|---|
| Whig | Edward Seymour | Unopposed | |
| Whig | Jasper Parrott (MP) | Unopposed | |
| Registered electors | | 259 | |
| Whig hold | | | |
| Whig hold | | | |

By-election, 17 February 1834: Totnes
| Party | Candidate | Votes | % | ±% |
|---|---|---|---|---|
| Whig | Edward Seymour | 153 | 67.7 | −11.7 |
| Radical | John Thomas Mayne | 73 | 32.3 | N/A |
| Majority | | 80 | 35.4 | +16.3 |
| Turnout | | 226 | 81.6 | −0.9 |
| Registered electors | | 277 | | |
| Whig hold | | Swing | −11.7 | |

- Caused by Cornish's resignation

General election 1832: Totnes
| Party | Candidate | Votes | % | ±% |
|---|---|---|---|---|
| Whig | James Cornish | 127 | 39.7 | N/A |
| Whig | Jasper Parrott (MP) | 127 | 39.7 | N/A |
| Tory | Edmund Parker | 66 | 20.6 | −79.5 |
| Majority | | 61 | 19.1 | N/A |
| Turnout | | 179 | 82.5 | c. −0.5 |
| Registered electors | | 217 | | |
| Whig gain from Tory | | Swing | N/A | |
| Whig gain from Tory | | Swing | N/A | |

General election 1831: Totnes
| Party | Candidate | Votes | % |
|---|---|---|---|
| Tory | Thomas Courtenay | 56 | 40.6 |
| Tory | Charles Barry Baldwin | 43 | 31.2 |
| Tory | Henry Vane | 39 | 28.3 |
| Majority | | 4 | 2.9 |
| Turnout | | 78 | c. 83.0 |
| Registered electors | | c. 94 | |
| Tory hold | | | |
| Tory hold | | | |

General election 1830: Totnes
| Party | Candidate | Votes | % |
|---|---|---|---|
| Tory | Thomas Courtenay | Unopposed | |
| Tory | Charles Barry Baldwin | Unopposed | |
| Tory hold | | | |
| Tory hold | | | |

== See also ==
- List of parliamentary constituencies in Devon
