= John Sebright (Totnes MP) =

English politician

John Sebright (fl. 1413) of Totnes, Devon, was an English politician.

He was a member (MP) of the parliament of England for Totnes in May 1413.
