= Walter Browning =

14th-century English politician

Walter Browning (fl. 1388) was an English politician.

He was a member (MP) of the parliament of England for Totnes in February 1388.
