= John Eveleigh (MP) =

16th-century English politician

John Eveleigh (c. 1511–1586), of Holcombe in Ottery St. Mary, Devon, was an English politician, a feodary and attorney.

He was a member (MP) of the parliament of England for Totnes in April 1554 and for Tavistock in November 1554.
