= Simon Marsh (MP) =

English politician

Simon Marsh (fl. 1399), of Totnes, Devon, was an English politician.

He was a member (MP) of the parliament of England for Totnes in 1399.
