= John Poltimore =

English politician

John Poltimore (fl. 1390) was an English politician.

He was a member (MP) of the parliament of England for Totnes in January 1390.
