= Henry Berkeley (MP for Totnes) =

English politician

Henry Berkeley (fl. 1414–1421) was an English politician.

He was a member (MP) of the parliament of England for Totnes in November 1414 and May 1421.
