= Edward Buggin =

16th-century English politician

Edward Buggin (died 1590), of Clerkenwell, London, was an English politician.

He was a member (MP) of the Parliament of England for Totnes in 1572.
