= John Warwick (MP for Totnes) =

English politician

John Warwick (fl. 1406) was an English politician.

He was a member (MP) of the parliament of England for Totnes in 1406.
