= Nicholas Ball (MP) =

16th-century English politician

Nicholas Ball (died 1586), of Totnes; later of Dartington, Devon, was an English politician.

He was a member (MP) of the parliament of England for Totnes in 1584. He was Mayor of Totnes in 1585–1586.
