= Henry Austin (MP) =

15th-century English politician

Henry Austin or Brasuter (fl. 1410–1413), of Totnes, Devon was an English politician.

He was a member (MP) of the parliament of England for Totnes in 1410 and May 1413. He was also reeve of Totnes 1408 to 1409, an office his father John (also mayor of the same place 1358 to 1359) also held from 1354 to 1355.
