= Edward St Maur, 12th Duke of Somerset =

British aristocrat and Whig politician (1804–1885)

His Grace The Duke of Somerset KG PC
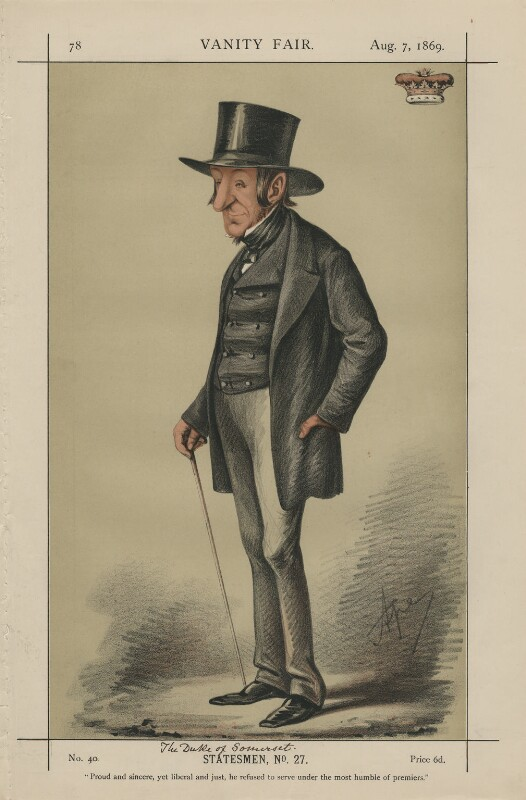
- The Duke of Somerset, by Carlo Pellegrini, 1869.

First Commissioner of Woods and Forests
- In office 17 April 1849 – 1 August 1851
- Monarch: Victoria
- Prime Minister: Lord John Russell
- Preceded by: The Earl of Carlisle
- Succeeded by: Office abolished

First Commissioner of Works
- In office 1 August 1851 – 21 February 1852
- Monarch: Victoria
- Prime Minister: Lord John Russell
- Preceded by: New office
- Succeeded by: Lord John Manners

First Lord of the Admiralty
- In office 27 June 1859 – 26 June 1866
- Monarch: Victoria
- Prime Minister: The Viscount Palmerston; The Earl Russell
- Preceded by: Sir John Pakington, Bt
- Succeeded by: Sir John Pakington, Bt

Personal details
- Born: 20 December 1804 Piccadilly, Westminster, United Kingdom
- Died: 28 November 1885 (aged 80) Stover Lodge, Teigngrace, Devon, United Kingdom
- Party: Whig
- Spouse(s): Jane Georgiana Sheridan (d. 1884)
- Children: 5, including Ferdinand
- Parent(s): Edward St Maur, 11th Duke of Somerset; Lady Charlotte Hamilton
- Education: Christ Church, Oxford

Edward Adolphus St Maur, 12th Duke of Somerset, KG, PC (20 December 1804 – 28 November 1885), styled Lord Seymour until 1855, was a British Whig aristocrat and politician, who served in various cabinet positions in the mid-19th century, including that of First Lord of the Admiralty.

== Background and education ==
Somerset was the eldest son of Edward St Maur, 11th Duke of Somerset, and Lady Charlotte, daughter of Archibald Hamilton, 9th Duke of Hamilton. He was baptized on 16 February 1805 at St. George's, Hanover Square, London. He was educated at Eton and Christ Church, Oxford.

He owned 25,000 acres, mostly in Devon, Somerset and Wiltshire.

== Political career ==
Somerset sat as Member of Parliament as Lord Seymour for Okehampton between 1830 and 1831 and for Totnes between 1834 and 1855. He served under Lord Melbourne as a Lord of the Treasury between 1835 and 1839, as Joint Secretary to the Board of Control between 1839 and 1841 and as Under-Secretary of State for the Home Department between June and August 1841 and was a member of Lord John Russell's first administration as First Commissioner of Woods and Forests between 1849 and 1851, when the office was abolished. He served on the Royal Commission on the British Museum (1847–49). In August 1851 he was appointed to the newly created office of First Commissioner of Works by Russell. In October of the same year, he entered the cabinet and was sworn of the Privy Council. He remained First Commissioner of Works until the government fell in February 1852.

Somerset succeeded his father in the dukedom in 1855 and entered the House of Lords. He did not serve in Lord Palmerston's first administration, but when Palmerston became Prime Minister for the second time in 1859, Somerset was appointed First Lord of the Admiralty, with a seat in the cabinet. He held this post until 1866, the last year under the premiership of Russell. He refused to join William Ewart Gladstone's first ministry in 1868, but gave independent support to the chief measures of the government.

He was made a Knight of the Garter in 1862 and in 1863 he was created Earl St. Maur, of Berry Pomeroy in the County of Devon. "St. Maur" was supposed to have been the original form of the family name and "Seymour" a later corruption. From some time in the early 19th century until 1923, "St. Maur" was used as the family name, but since 1923 the dukes have again used the familiar "Seymour".

Somerset was also the author of Christian Theology and Modern Scepticism (1872), and Monarchy and Democracy (1880). Between 1861 and 1885 he served as Lord Lieutenant of Devon.

== Family ==
Somerset married in Grosvenor Square, London, on 10 June 1830, Jane Georgiana Sheridan, who was the "Queen of Beauty" at the Eglinton Tournament of 1839. The Somersets had two sons and three daughters:

- Lady Jane Hermione Seymour (1 January 1832 – 4 April 1909) she married Sir Frederick Ulric Graham, 3rd Baronet, of Netherby, on 26 October 1852. They had eight children, including the Countess of Verulam and the Duchess of Montrose.
- Lady Ulrica Frederica Jane Seymour (12 January 1833 – 26 or 28 January 1916) she married the Rt Hon. Lord Henry Frederick Thynne on 1 June 1858. They had six children.
- Edward Adolphus Ferdinand, Earl St. Maur, suo jure 13th Baron Seymour (1835–1869), who had two illegitimate children by his maid, Rosina Swan.
- Lord Edward Percy Seymour (19 August 1841 – 20 December 1865) was a diplomat and died after being mauled by a bear.
- Lady Helen Guendolen Seymour (14 November 1846 – 14 August 1910) she married Sir John William Ramsden, 5th Baronet on 2 August 1865. They had four children. Lady Guendolen Ramsden inherited the Bulstrode estate.

Her Grace died on 14 December 1884. The Duke of Somerset survived her by less than a year and died on 28 November 1885, aged 80, and was buried with her in St James's Churchyard at Gerrards Cross, Buckinghamshire. As his two sons both died in his lifetime, the family titles (except the Earldom of St. Maur, which became extinct) devolved on his younger brother, Archibald Seymour, 13th Duke of Somerset.

The 12th Duke left his London residence, Somerset House in Park Lane, to his eldest daughter Lady Hermione Graham.

== Ancestry ==
Ancestors of Edward St Maur, 12th Duke of Somerset

Edward Seymour, 8th Duke of Somerset
Webb Seymour, 10th Duke of Somerset
Mary Webb
Edward Adolphus St Maur, 11th Duke of Somerset
John Bonnell
Anna Maria/Mary Anne Bonnell
Edward Seymour, 12th Duke of Somerset
James Hamilton, 5th Duke of Hamilton
Archibald Hamilton, 9th Duke of Hamilton
Anne Spencer
Lady Charlotte Douglas-Hamilton
Alexander Stewart, 6th Earl of Galloway
Harriet Stewart
Lady Catherine Cochrane

Parliament of the United Kingdom
Preceded by Sir Compton Domvile; Joseph Strutt	Member of Parliament for Okehampton; 1830–1831; With: George Agar-Ellis	Succeeded by William Henry Trant; John Thomas Hope
Preceded by James Cornish; Jasper Parrott	Member of Parliament for Totnes; 1834–1855; With: Jasper Parrott 1834–1839; Charles Barry Baldwin 1839–1852; Thomas Mills 1852–1855	Succeeded by Thomas Mills; Earl of Gifford
Political offices
Preceded by Robert Gordon; Robert Vernon Smith	Joint Secretary to the Board of Control; 1839–1841; With: William Clay	Succeeded by William Clay; Charles Buller
Preceded by Fox Maule	Under-Secretary of State for the Home Department; 1841	Succeeded by John Manners-Sutton
Preceded by The Earl of Carlisle	First Commissioner of Woods and Forests; 1850–1851	Office abolished
New office	First Commissioner of Works; 1851–1852	Succeeded by Lord John Manners
Preceded by Sir John Pakington, Bt	First Lord of the Admiralty; 1859–1866	Succeeded by Sir John Pakington, Bt
Honorary titles
Preceded by The Earl Fortescue	Lord Lieutenant of Devon; 1861–1885	Succeeded by The Earl of Iddesleigh
Peerage of England
Preceded by Edward St Maur	Baron Seymour (descended by acceleration); 1855–1863	Succeeded by Ferdinand Seymour
Preceded by Edward St Maur	Duke of Somerset; 1855–1885	Succeeded by Archibald St Maur
Preceded by Ferdinand Seymour	Baron Seymour; 1869–1885	Succeeded by Archibald St Maur
Peerage of the United Kingdom
New creation	Earl St Maur; 1863–1885	Extinct
