= Robert Wastell =

English politician

Robert Wastell (fl. 1406–1410) of Totnes, Devon, was an English politician.

He was a member (MP) of the parliament of England for Totnes in 1406 and 1410.
