= John Norton Pomeroy =

American lawyer

Personal details
- Born: April 12, 1828 Rochester, New York, U.S.
- Died: February 15, 1885 (aged 56) San Francisco, California, U.S.
- Spouse: Ann Rebecca Carter (m. 1855)
- Education: Hamilton College (BA)

John Norton Pomeroy (April 12, 1828 – February 15, 1885) was an American lawyer, writer, and law professor. “Perhaps the most important text book writer of the last third of the nineteenth century,” Pomeroy is one of the foremost contributors to American jurisprudence on topics ranging from equity to municipal law.

== Early life ==
John Norton Pomeroy was born on April 12, 1828, in Rochester, New York. Enos Pomeroy, his father, was a pioneer settler in Rochester as well as one of the first lawyers to practice in western New York. Pomeroy started at Hamilton College in Clinton, New York at just 15 years old. He was a member of the Sigma Phi fraternity and graduated at 1847. After graduating from college, he served as an instructor of Rochester Academy. After three years, he was promoted to lead their campus at Lebanon, Ohio. He next began to study law by apprenticing in Cincinnati in the law office of Senator Thomas Corwin.

In 1851, Pomeroy returned to Rochester as part of the office of Henry R. Selden. He was admitted to the New York State bar in 1851, practicing in Rochester until 1861. There he “displayed a genuine scholarly bent that a cynic might feel was confirmed by the fact that in his nine years of practice in Rochester, his native town, he had little if any business.” He married Ann Rebecca Carter, one of his former pupils, in 1855.

Pomeroy moved to New York City in 1861 to try to start his own law practice. He was not successful, instead resorting to working as a school teacher again. For four years served as the principal of a boys' school called the academy in Kingston, New York. It was there he wrote his first book, An Introduction to Municipal Law, in 1864. It was designed as a book for the general lay reader and as a textbook for colleges and law schools.

== Tenure at New York University Law School ==
The success surrounding the publication of Introduction to Municipal Law earned him an LL.D degree from his alma mater and an appointment to University of New York City as a professor of law, and later chair of political science in the undergraduate department. Pomeroy later served as dean of the recently established school until 1871. While teaching, he also wrote the treatise, Introduction to the Constitutional Law of the United States, in 1868, which was the first legal text on constitutional law published after the Civil War.

He was known to use the “conference” or seminar method. Pomeroy developed this system as using a “printed ‘syllabus’ or outline of topics, with lists of illustrative cases, and the first-hand study, of these cases and their free discussion in the class room.” He believed that the “central principle of all true education, whether professional or general” is that the student “must be taught and accustomed to acquire [knowledge] for himself.” United States Secretary of State Elihu Root, one of his pupils, described his teaching style as highly personal and centered on small class sizes:

I came to this city, and found Professor Pomeroy alone in the library of the University Law School, then a struggling institution, with but few students, a limited library, and a professor. For the two years which succeeded, the greater part of my time was passed in that library, with that professor. . . . The students were few in number; each one knew the professor personally, intimately, and was with him day by day, hour after hour, sometimes from the early morning until late in the evening; the whole day being occupied in the library with the professor there, the studies interspersed with occasional questions and answers, and discussions; and impromptu moot-courts coming up without any premeditation; so that we had opportunity not only to receive systematic instruction, but to know the man.

He also believed that law school should last three years and at least provide an elementary understanding of all of the basic doctrines of law, rather than an intimate knowledge of a smaller range of topics. In his view, legal education should be practical launching off point, rather than an end in of itself. His expressed these views in his inaugural address, on taking the chair of municipal law in the University of California, in 1878:

In the first place, I most profoundly believe that the law must be studied historically. . . . But while the historical method of study is thus absolutely essential, it is one thing to study the present existing law of the United States historically, and a very different thing, under the name of the historical method, to study only the law which existed and was in full operation in England a century ago. It is absolutely astonishing—it would be incredible in any other profession—how much time of students all over this vast country is wasted every year in learning doctrines and rules of the English law which are utterly obsolete, which were always arbitrary in their nature, and do not therefore aid in understanding the law of the present day—which must be forgotten and banished from the mind as soon as learned, and which only tend to interfere with and hinder a full and accurate comprehension of the rules which are now in active operation and are daily ad ministered by our courts. It is not so in any other profession. . . . In a word, it will be the aim of this law school to base its teaching upon the actual jurisprudence of the American states; to present to its classes living principles and doctrines which are embodied in that jurisprudence, and thus to prepare them for entering at once upon the professional life for which they are obtaining a fitting preparation.

In 1871, he resigned from his position and returned to Rochester due to ill health. There he continued his legal writing on codes and codification. Six years later published Remedies and Remedial Rights to meet the need for a text that could clarify the changes in practice resulting from the codification of law across many states. He also wrote almost two hundred articles on legal topics for Johnson’s Encyclopedia, of which he became an assistant editor, helped prepare annotated editions of Theodore Sedgwick’s Statutory and Constitutional Law (1874) and Archbold’s Criminal Procedure (1877), and was a contributor to The Nation and the American Law Review on topics ranging from international law and diplomacy to constitutional law.

== Tenure at Hastings College of the Law ==
In 1878, the University of California opened Hastings School of Law in San Francisco, California, the state’s first law school. The reputation he built as a legal writer helped lead to an appointment there. Serranus Clinton Hastings, California’s first Chief Justice and third Attorney General, selected Professor Pomeroy to lead the development of Hastings Law’s legal education. Before the first meeting of the faculty on August 8, 1878, the Board of the College created a Professorship of Municipal Law with a salary $300 per month, appointing Pomeroy to that position. They first directed him to draw up his “whole system” of legal education to present to the Board and asked him to lecture 10 hours a week. This was the only direction given to him. Pomeroy was given wide latitude to set up this institution for the first 103 students.

Pomeroy served as both its main administrator and sole professor of Hastings by himself during its early years. Those duties entailed serving almost two hundred students across three large classes, while making himself a master of the many peculiarities of California state law. On top of that, he worked on A Treatise on the Specific Performance of Contracts, which was published in 1879. For the next four years, he worked on perhaps his most notable work, Equity Jurisprudence. This three-volume text, published between 1881 and 1883, greatly shaped the development of equity law in the United States. Case reporting was developing into its present system at the time, and Pomeroy edited the main West Coast Reporter with his son Carter Pitkin.

Another influential work he published at this time was a series of articles entitled, The True Method of Interpreting the Civil Code. In 1872, California enacted a new substantive Civil Code based on a draft by Field. Pomeroy felt dismayed at how the code operated, deeming it full of “defects, imperfections, omissions, and . . . inconsistencies.” He believed that judges should use the code simply as a guide of common law rules and practices rather than an authoritative source of law. The California Supreme Court adopted the approached he laid out in his True Method articles in 1888.

== Later years and death ==
Between 1882 and 1884, Pomeroy served as counsel in the Railroad Tax Cases, in involved grave questions of constitutional law. He also served as counsel on behalf of the farmers in the Debris' Case, which shaped the economic history of California by enjoining the industry of hydraulic mining that was polluting the California river ways. Although Pomeroy was known for his writing, he was also a skilled orator in the courtroom. A California judge who he appeared before in San Mateo complimented his presentation, calling it “lucid and eminently instructive.”

At the time of his death, Pomeroy was starting a treatise on Equity Pleading, which was set to review the equity practice with the supreme courts of each state. He also intended to draft a modern version of James Kent’s Commentaries on American Law, Institutes of American Law as well as a second treatise on constitutional law. He died at 56 years old at his home on the corner of Clay and Hyde Streets in San Francisco, after a brief illness of pneumonia on February 15, 1885. He was buried in Mountain View Cemetery across the bay in Oakland, California.

== Publications ==
- An Introduction to Municipal Law (1865)
- An Introduction to the Constitutional Law of the United States (1868; ninth edition, 1886)
- Remedies and Remedial Rights According to the Reformed American Procedure (1876)
- A Treatise on Riparian Rights (1884)
- A Treatise on the Law of Water Rights (1887, 1893)
- A Treatise on Equity Jurisprudence (third edition, four volumes, 1905)
