= Charles Kelland =

English politician

Charles Kelland (1660–1695), of Painsford, Ashprington, Devon, was an English politician.

He was a member (MP) of the parliament of England for Totnes in 1681.
