= John Kelland (politician) =

John Kelland (c. 1635 – 7 October 1692), of Painsford in the parish of Ashprington in Devon, was a Member of Parliament for Totnes in March 1679, 1681 and 1685.
