= Thomas Coulson (MP) =

English politician

Thomas Coulson (1645–1713), of Tower Royal, London, was an English politician.

He was a member (MP) of the parliament of England and Parliament of Great Britain for Totnes on 14 December 1692 – 1695, 1698–1708 and 1710 – 2 June 1713.
