= Jim Pomeroy (politician) =

American politician

Member of the North Dakota Senate from the 27th district
- In office 2007 - 2010
- Succeeded by: Spencer Berry

Personal details
- Born: December 16, 1936
- Died: April 8, 2016 (aged 79) Fargo, North Dakota
- Party: North Dakota Democratic-NPL Party
- Spouse: Mavis
- Education: North Dakota State University, Drew University, McCormick Theological Seminary
- Profession: Minister

James Pomeroy (December 16, 1936 – April 8, 2016) was an American pastor in the United Methodist Church who served as a North Dakota Democratic-NPL Party member of the North Dakota Senate, representing the 27th district.

== Early life and education ==
Pomeroy grew up in Fargo, where he graduated from Central High School. He earned Bachelor of Science and Master of Divinity degrees from North Dakota State University and a Doctor of Ministry degree from Drew University Theological School (which he attended with the other members of his high school singing quartet, The Uncalled Four), and also studied at McCormick Theological Seminary.

== Church career ==
Pomeroy was ordained as an elder in the Methodist Church in 1961 and served as a pastor and administrator in North and South Dakota for 43 years until his retirement in 2002, including leading training meetings in the 1970s.

== Political career ==
In 2006 Pomeroy defeated incumbent Richard Brown, a Republican, for a four-year term in the North Dakota Senate representing the 27th district. He served on committees including Health and Human Services and Judicial Processes. He declined to seek re-election.

== Private life and death ==
Pomeroy was a cousin of Earl Pomeroy, who served in the United States House of Representatives. He and his wife Mavis, whom he married in 1971, had a daughter. He died in 2016 at the age of 79.
