= Thomas Courtenay (British politician) =

British politician and writer, vice-president of the Board of Trade

The Right Honourable Thomas Courtenay PC

Vice-President of the Board of Trade
- In office 30 May 1828 – 15 November 1830
- Monarchs: George IV; William IV
- Prime Minister: The Duke of Wellington
- Preceded by: Thomas Frankland Lewis
- Succeeded by: Charles Poulett Thomson

Personal details
- Born: 31 May 1782
- Died: 8 July 1841 (aged 59)
- Spouse(s): Anne Wynell-Mayow (d. 1860)

Thomas Peregrine Courtenay PC (31 May 1782 – 8 July 1841) was a British politician and writer. He served as Vice-President of the Board of Trade under the Duke of Wellington between 1828 and 1830.

== Background ==
Courtenay was the second son of the Right Reverend Henry Reginald Courtenay (d.1803), Bishop of Exeter, and his wife Lady Elizabeth Howard, daughter of Thomas Howard, 2nd Earl of Effingham. His paternal grandmother Lady Catherine was the daughter of Allen Bathurst, 1st Earl Bathurst. His elder brother was William Courtenay, 10th Earl of Devon (1777–1859).

== Political career ==
Courtenay sat as member of parliament for Totnes from 1811 to 1832 and served under the Duke of Wellington as Vice-President of the Board of Trade from 1828 to 1830. In 1828 he was sworn of the Privy Council.

== Publications ==
Courtenay was also a writer and published among other works Memoirs of the Life, Works and Correspondence of Sir William Temple, Bart (London, 1836) and Commentaries on the historical plays of Shakspeare.

== Family ==
Courtenay married Anne, daughter of Mayow Wynell-Mayow, in 1805. They had eight sons and five daughters. Three of their sons gained particular distinction. Their second son the Rt.Rev. Reginald Courtenay (1813–1906) was Bishop of Kingston, Jamaica, between 1856 and 1879. Their sixth son Richard William Courtenay (1820–1904) was a Vice-Admiral in the Royal Navy. Their seventh son Henry Reginald Courtenay (1823–1911) was a Major-General in the Royal Artillery. Courtenay drowned while sea bathing at Torquay. in July 1841, aged 59.

Parliament of the United Kingdom
Preceded by William Adams; Benjamin Hall	Member of Parliament for Totnes; 1811–1832; With: Benjamin Hall 1811–1812; Ayshford Wise 1812–1818; William Holmes 1818–1820; John Bent 1820–1826; Viscount Barnard 1826–1830; Charles Barry Baldwin 1830–1832	Succeeded by James Cornish; Jasper Parrott
Political offices
Preceded by Thomas Frankland Lewis	Vice-President of the Board of Trade; 1828–1830	Succeeded by Charles Poulett Thomson
