= Richard Whitelegh =

English politician (fl. 1362–1394)

Richard Whitelegh (fl. 1362–1394) of Osborn Newton in Churchstow, Devon, was an English politician.

He was a Member (MP) of the Parliament of England for Totnes in 1362 and 1394, and for Dartmouth in 1368 and 1386.

Parliament of England
Unknown	Member of Parliament for Totnes; 1362	Succeeded by John Prescott
Unknown	Member of Parliament for Dartmouth; 1368	Succeeded by John Pasford
Unknown	Member of Parliament for Dartmouth; 1386; With: Robert More	Succeeded by William Burlestone; John Lacche
Preceded by John Suell; Robert Barneburgh	Member of Parliament for Totnes; 1394; With: John Pasford	Succeeded by Ellis Beare; John Marshall
Political offices
Preceded by Sir James Chudleigh	High Sheriff of Devon; 1385–1387	Succeeded by Richard Chaumbernon
