= John Fownes =

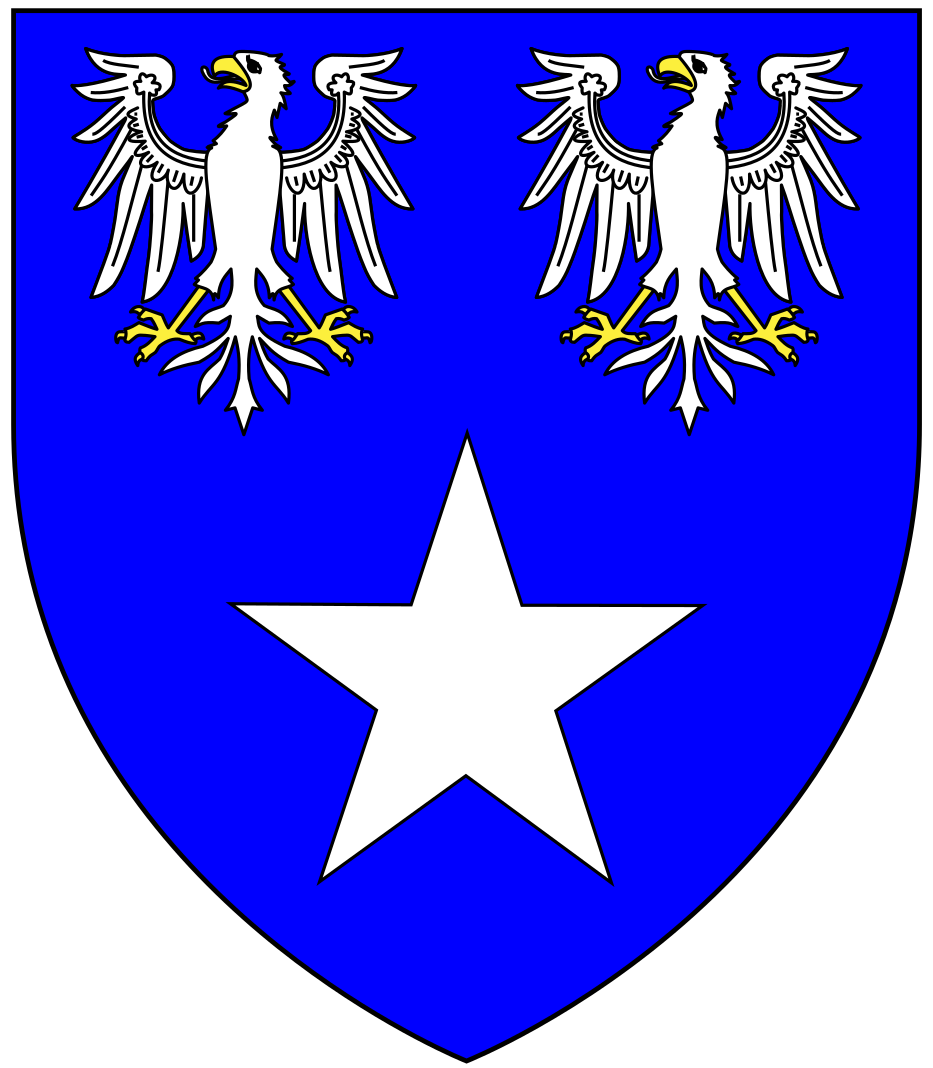
Arms of Fownes: Azure, two eagles displayed in chief and a mullet in base argent

John Fownes (1661–1731) of Kittery Court in the parish of Kingswear and of Nethway in the parish of Brixham, both in Devon, was a British landowner and politician who sat in the House of Commons from 1714 to 1715.

== Origin and early life ==
Fownes was the eldest son and heir of John Fownes (1640–1670) of Whitleigh (anciently Whitley) in the parish of St Budeaux, near Plymouth, Devon, by his wife Mary Northleigh (1641–1669), a daughter of Henry Northleigh (1612–1675) of Peamore, Exminster, Devon and sister of Henry Northleigh (1643–1694) of Peamore, thrice MP for Okehampton. His great grandfather was Thomas Fones (died 1638) of Plymouth, Mayor of Plymouth in 1619, who was from Worcestershire and was the first of his family to settle in Devon.

Nethway House, Kingswear

In 1681 Fownes married Anne Yard, a daughter of Edward Yarde (1638–1703) of Churston Court, Churston Ferrers, Devon, MP for Ashburton in 1685, and sister of Edward Yarde (1668/9–1735) of Churston Court, MP for Totnes in 1695. After his marriage, he moved to Kittery Court, a fine house near Dartmouth and became a Freeman of Dartmouth in 1701. Later he purchased the fire damaged Nethway House (and estate) in Kingswear, near Dartmouth from the Hody family and carried out the necessary restoration.

== Career ==
Fownes was a high Tory and was returned as Member of Parliament for Dartmouth at a by-election on 20 March 1714. He did not stand at the 1715 general election when his son was returned as MP for Dartmouth instead.

== Death and legacy ==
Fownes died on 4 October 1731 and was buried at Brixham. He had two surviving sons and one surviving daughter. His eldest son was:

- John Fownes (died 1733) of Kittery Court, a Member of Parliament for Dartmouth in 1715, who married Anne Maddock, a daughter of Samuel Maddock of Tamerton Foliot. His son was Henry Fownes Luttrell (c.1722-1780), of Dunster Castle, Somerset, High Sheriff of Somerset from 1754 to 1755, and a Member of Parliament for Minehead from 1768 to 1774, who married Margaret Luttrell, the heiress of Dunster Castle and added his wife's name to his own to comply with her father's will.

Fownes presented to St Mary's Church, Brixham, a 44 ounce silver flagon dated 1704 with a Dublin hallmark. In the Nethway Chapel at the east end of the south aisle of St Mary's Church, Brixham, are buried Thomas Fownes, Vicar 1755-1809, and others of the Fownes family, and several mural monuments to the Fownes and Luttrell families.

Parliament of Great Britain
Preceded by Sir William Drake; Frederick Herne	Member of Parliament for Dartmouth; 1714–1715; With: Sir William Drake	Succeeded by Joseph Herne; John Fownes
