= Sir William Drake, 4th Baronet =

English Tory politician

Sir William Drake, 4th Baronet (1658–1716), of Mount Drake, and Ashe House, Musbury, Devon, was an English Tory politician who sat in the English and British House of Commons from 1690 to 1715.

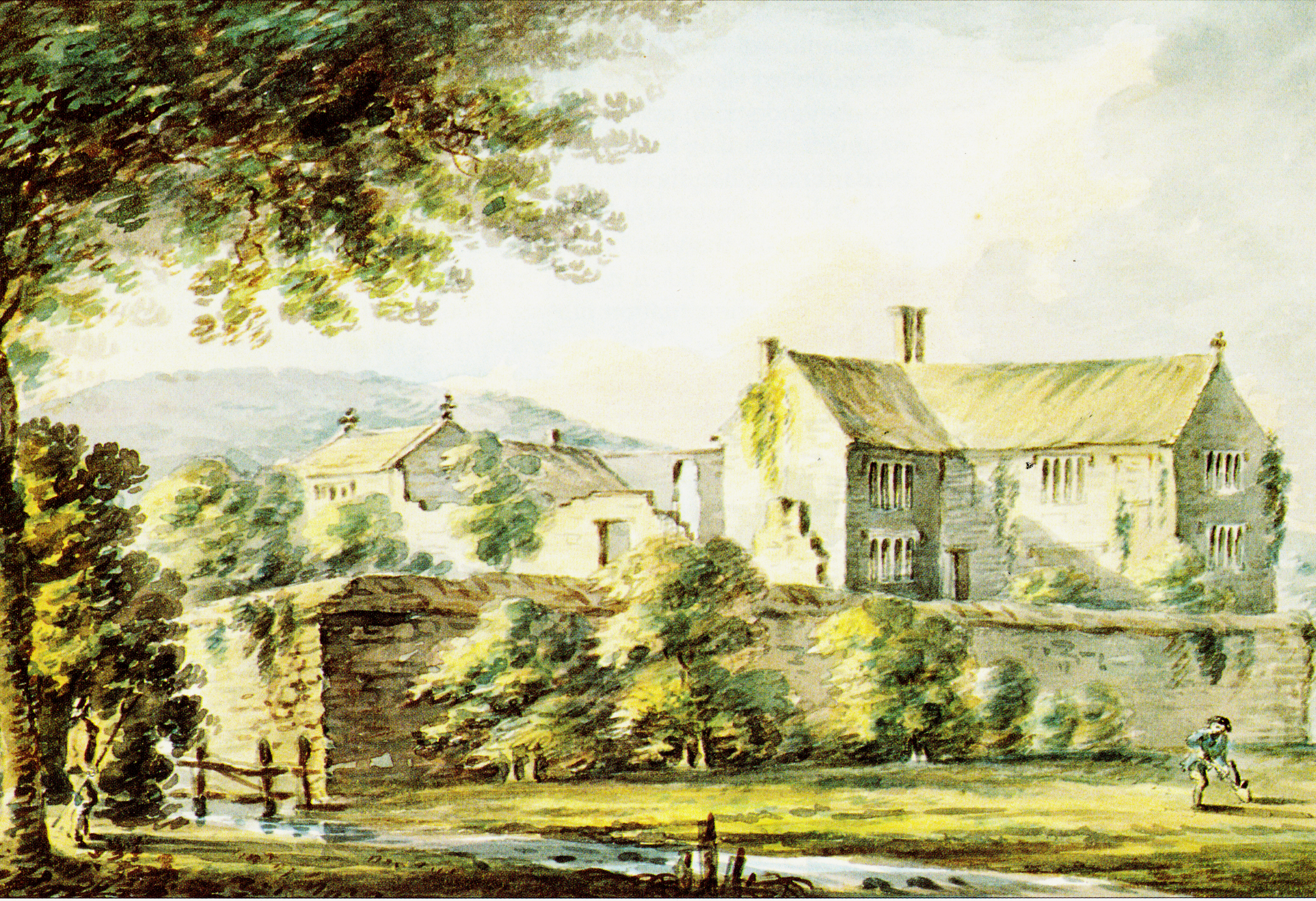
Ashe House, Musbury

== Early life, education and career ==
Drake was a younger son of Sir John Drake, 1st Baronet. He matriculated at Oriel College, Oxford in 1675 and was awarded BA in 1679 and MA in 1683 from Corpus Christi College, Oxford. He was knighted in 1685 and succeeded his brother Bernard as 4th Baronet in 1687.He married in 1687, Judith, the daughter and coheiress of William Eveleigh of Olcomb, Ottery St. Mary, Devon, He inherited Mount Drake and Ashe House from his sister in 1694. and secondly in 1705, Mary, the daughter of Sir Peter Prideaux, 3rd Baronet, of Netherton, Devon.

Drake was a Member of Parliament (MP) for Honiton in 1690–1715 and for Dartmouth in 1713–1715. He was a Lord of the Admiralty in 1710–14.

== Personal life and death ==
Drake died in 1716, By his first wife, he had two sons and three daughters He was succeeded in the baronetcy by both sons, John and William.

Parliament of England
Preceded by Edmond Walrond; Richard Courtenay	Member of Parliament for Honiton; 1690–1707; With: Sir Walter Yonge	Succeeded by Parliament of Great Britain
Parliament of Great Britain
Preceded by Parliament of England	Member of Parliament for Honiton; 1707–1715; With: Sir Walter Yonge 1707-1711; James Sheppard 1711-1715	Succeeded by Sir William Courtenay; Sir William Yonge
Preceded by Nathaniel Herne; Frederick Herne	Member of Parliament for Dartmouth; 1713–1715; With: Frederick Herne 1713-1714; John Fownes 1714-1715	Succeeded by Joseph Herne; John Fownes (junior)
Baronetage of England
Preceded by Bernard Drake	Baronet (of Ashe); 1687-1716	Succeeded by John Drake
