= Pafford =

Pafford is a surname. Notable people with the surname include:

- Caroline Pafford Miller (1903–1992), American writer
- Arch Pafford, politician in New Brunswick, Canada
- John Pafford (MP)
- John Henry Pyle Pafford (1900–1996), English librarian and soldier
- Mark Pafford (born 1966), Florida Democratic politician
- Ward B. Pafford (1911–2011), president of the University of West Georgia

== See also ==
- Combe Pafford, village in Torbay in the English county of Devon
- Spafford
