= John Bosom (died 1440) =

English politician

John Bosom (died 1440), of Bosomzeal, Dittisham, Devon, was an English politician.

He was a Member (MP) of the Parliament of England for Dartmouth in 1395 and January 1397 and for Totnes in 1411.

Parliament of England
Preceded by William Damiet; John Hawley	Member of Parliament for Dartmouth; 1395–1397; With: Edmund Arnold 1395; William Glover 1397	Unknown
Preceded by Henry Austin; Robert Wastell	Member of Parliament for Totnes; 1411; With: Henry Bremeler	Unknown
Political offices
Preceded by James Chudleigh	High Sheriff of Devon; 1430–1431	Succeeded by Edward Pomeroy
