= John Fownes (junior) =

British politician

John Fownes (c. 1687–1733) of Nethway and Kittery Court, near Dartmouth, was a British politician who sat in the House of Commons from 1715 to 1722.

Nethway House, Kingswear

Fownes was the eldest son of John Fownes of Nethway and his wife Anne Yarde, daughter. of Edward Yarde, MP of Churston Ferrers, Devon. He matriculated at Hart Hall, Oxford on 10 October 1702, aged 15. He married, Elizabeth Berry, daughter of Robert Berry of Plymouth on 24 January 1709. She died on 23 January 1719 and he married secondly Anne Maddock, daughter of Samuel Maddock of Tamerton Folliot, near Plymouth, Devon, on 9 May 1720.

Fownes was returned as Tory Member of Parliament for Dartmouth at the 1715 general election. There is only one record of his voting, which was against the septennial bill. He did not stand in 1722.

Fownes succeeded to the estates of his father in 1731 and died two years later on 1 October 1733. He had a son and three daughters by his first wife and three sons by his second wife. His son, Henry, born 1722, married Margaret Luttrell, the daughter and heir of Alexander Luttrell.

Parliament of Great Britain
Preceded by Sir William Drake; John Fownes	Member of Parliament for Dartmouth; 1715–1722; With: Joseph Herne	Succeeded by George Treby; Thomas Martyn
