= John Pafford =

John Pafford may refer to:

- John Pafford (MP)
- John Henry Pyle Pafford, librarian
