= Thomas Fones =

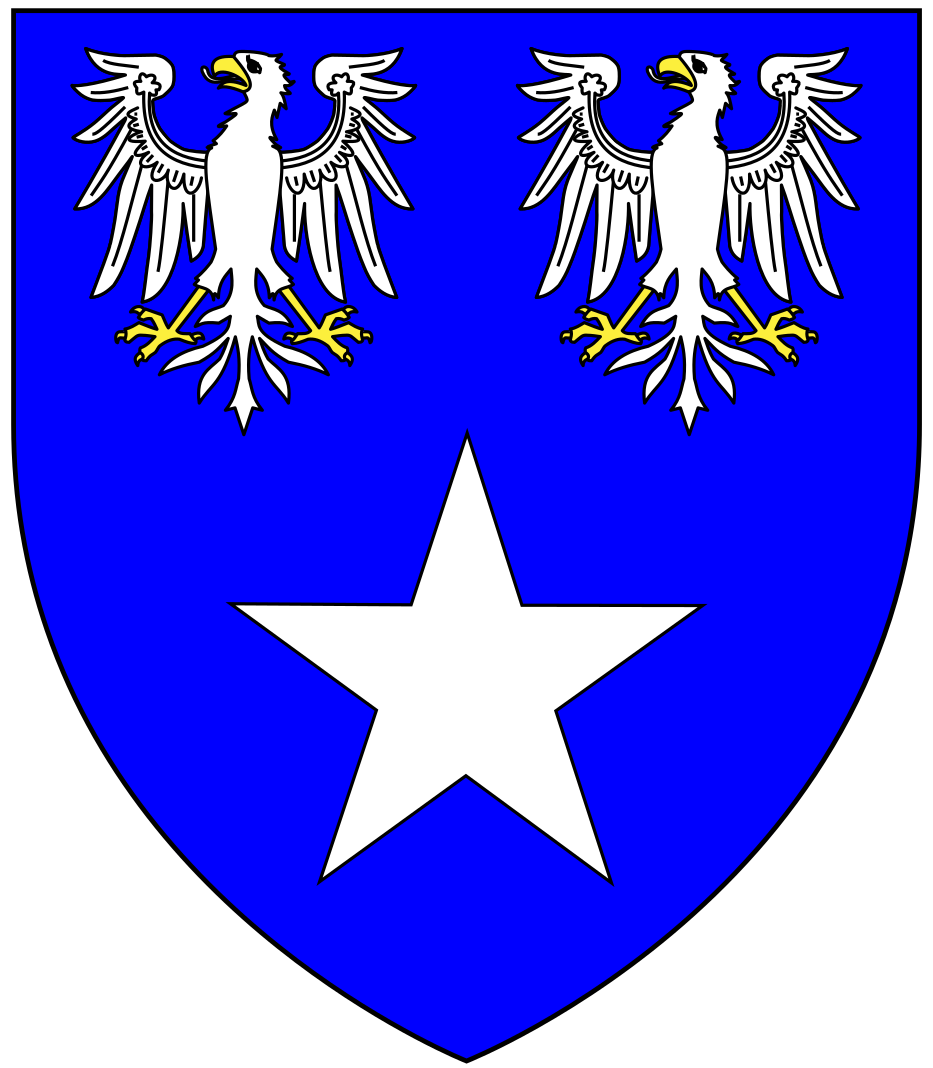
Arms of Fownes: Azure, two eagles displayed in chief and a mullet in base argent

Thomas Fones (died 1638) (later Fownes) of the parish of St Andrew's in the City of Plymouth in Devon, was a merchant who served as Mayor of Plymouth in 1610 and 1619. He was the first of his family to have settled in Devon, and his descendants rose to prominence as members of the Devonshire gentry and as Members of Parliament. In 1746 his great-great-great-grandson Henry Fownes Luttrell (c.1722-1780), High Sheriff of Somerset from 1754 to 1755, and a Member of Parliament for Minehead from 1768 to 1774, married the heiress Margaret Luttrell, and inherited Dunster Castle in Somerset with the extensive Lutterell estates and added his wife's name to his own to comply with the terms of her father's will. He built almshouses near the Great Hill in Plymouth.

== Origins ==
He was born in Bridgwater in Somerset, the 4th son of Richard Fones of Bristol in Gloucestershire by his wife Joane Tindall, whose family was from the Isle of Axholme, as reported by Thomas Fownes himself in his return to the 1620 Heraldic Visitation of Devon. He mentions in his will 5the "daughters of Humpry Fownes deceased" but no mention is made in the Heraldic Visitation pedigree of Humphrey Fownes, JP, Mayor of Plymouth in 1588/9 and 1596/7, who married in 1574/5, who is mentioned in Worth's History of Plymouth. A monument to Humphry Fownes, dated 1589, was in St Andrew's Church, Plymouth (but may not have survived World War II damage) and in the same church was another dated 1624 recording how another John Fownes and his wife had been killed by the fall of a chimney. He further declared that his grandfather was John Fones "of Dodford" in the parish of Bromsgrove in Worcestershire, whose ancestor another John Fones, according to Habington's Survey of Worcestershire (1600), had acquired Dodford Priory in 1540 from Andrew Dudley, following the Dissolution of the Monasteries. He declared that previously the Fones family had been settled for at least 5 generations at "Saxby", all with the gentry status of "esquire". The 1603 "Bluemantle Pedigree", produced in 1603 for Thomas Fones by the Bluemantle Pursuivant herald, stated that "Sir Wm Fones, a Norman, came into England with the Conqueror" and married the daughter of Sir Robert Saxby of Saxby. Such pedigrees, produced for wealthy clients by mercenary heralds at this period are known to be largely fictitious.

== Mercantile career ==
He was a successful merchant. Worth in his History of Plymouth (1871) wrote: "About the end of the seventeenth century and the beginning of the eighteenth century when from various causes Plymouth seemingly enjoyed a greater share of trade than at any other time the Pollexfens, Rogerses, Trelawynes of Ham, Hewers of Manadon, Fowneses and Calmadys accumulated large fortunes from the fisheries and other sources. The fortunes of several county families were laid at Plymouth. The Fowneses bought Plympton Priory land at the Dissolution, that property subsequently passing to the Fownes-Luttrells of Dunster Castle".

== Mayor of Plymouth ==
He was Mayor of Plymouth in 1619.

== Builds Great Hill Almshouse ==
In his will he mentions "I lately built and erected a messuage, hospital and alms house near the Great Hill in Plymouth, containing thirteen rooms". Worth's Plymouth Municipal Records record a deed dated 2 March 1626: "Counterpart of grant by mayor and commonalty to Thomas Fownes, merchant, his heirs assigns of the messuage, house, hospital and almhouse within the said borough by the grantee (Thomas Fownes) on the Great Hill". Shortly after 1810, having by decay fallen into a "loathsome condition", they were sold to the Corporation of Plymouth for £500, for the purpose of widening the street. The proceeds were used by the feoffees to build a school room and infirmary at the old workhouse.

== Landholdings ==
He mentions various of his landholdings and property in his will including: "my farm and barton at Whitley; the barton of East Whitleigh and the manor of Honiknowle" (left to his son John); "my tenement in Tavistock; the tenths, tithe and sheafe of the parish of St. Budiox during my term and estate therein to come; messuages etc. in Plymouth called the Pump Close, by the pump near the new key; My messuages etc purchased by me and my heirs from my cousin Warwick Fownes lying in the parishes of Ilsington and High Week, Devon, and two pieces lying near the Lady Well; my manor of Lipson" (to his grandson Thomas Fownes, son of Richard Fownes deceased).

== Marriage and children ==
He married twice:

- Firstly to Prudence Nicholls (d.1606), a daughter of John Nicholls of Tavistock, by whom he had one son and three daughters as follows:
  - Richard Fownes (1602-1638), eldest son and heir apparent who narrowly predeceased his father, having left 2 sons:
    - Thomas Fownes (born 1631), eldest son
    - Richard Fownes (d.1680) of Ugborough, who left 4 daughters and whose monument survives in Ugborough Church. His grandfather left him by his will a tenement in Tavistock.
  - Prudence Fownes, wife of John Waddon;
  - Mary Fownes, wife of Richard Halworthy;
  - Jane Fownes, wife of Hugh Gayer (d.pre-1637)
- Secondly he married Jone Hele (d.1625/6), a daughter of Walter Hele (d.1609) of Gnaton in the parish of Newton Ferrers, Devon, by whom he had children:
  - Samsone Fownes (d.1625), 2nd son, predeceased his father.
  - Thomas Fownes (born 1612), 3rd son, died young, predeceased his father.
  - John Fownes (1614-1646) of Whitleigh, 4th and eldest surviving son and heir, who married Catherine Champernowne (1619/20-1642/3), 5th daughter of Arthur Champernowne (born 1579) of Dartington. He was bequeathed by his father the barton of East Whitleigh and the manor of Honicknowle, near Plymouth. His grandson was John Fownes (1661-1731) of Kittery Court in the parish of Kingswear and of Nethway in the parish of Brixham, both in Devon, a Member of Parliament for Dartmouth, Devon, in 1713-14.
  - Francis Fownes (born 1612 (? 1618), 5th son, died young, predeceased his father.
  - Thomas Fownes (1619-post 1638), 6th son, a co-executor of his father's will, with his brother John. He was bequeathed by his father "messuages etc in Plymouth called the Pump Close, by the pump near the new key."
  - Elizabeth Fownes (born 1613), 4th daughter, wife of Edward Yard;
  - Susan Fownes, 5th daughter, wife of John Kellond (1609-1679) of Painsford, Ashprington, Sheriff of Devon in 1666, who purchased Painsford in 1647.
  - Sarah Fownes, 6th daughter.

== Death & will ==
He died on 24 April 1638 and was buried at St Andrew's Church in Plymouth. He made several bequests to several persons in his will, dated 15 June 1637, proved 13 June 1638, including "the Mayor and commonalty of Plymouth one hundred pounds, to set poor people on work and keep them from idleness; a gift to the new Hospital of Orphans Aid near Plymouth Church; the poor of Bristol; the poor of Milbrooke in Cornwall"

== Sources ==
- Sothcott, Jill, Notes on the Fones (Fownes) family in England
- Fones, E. Bruce, www.fones.org, Fones (Fownes) Family Web Site
