= William Holland (merchant) =

English politician

William Holland (born 1478 or later, died 1547 or later) was an English merchant and administrator in Dartmouth, Devon. On three occasions he was briefly a member of parliament.

As a merchant, Holland specialized in trading with Spain. He was a Member of the Parliament of England for the borough of Dartmouth in 1529, 1539, and 1542. He felt the impact of the worsening relations with Spain caused by the years of the English Reformation begun by Henry VIII in the early 1530s. In 1537, his rival John Trevanion reported Holland to Thomas Cromwell for causing the plundering of two ships at Dartmouth, and Trevanion said he had ‘caused much trouble’. His enemies included Sir John Fulford, whose servants tried to attack him in 1538. In 1546 Holland seized goods from a Spanish ship.

The last certain trace of Holland is that in 1547 he filed a petition in Chancery against his nephew Robert in connection with an inheritance dispute.

He may have been mayor of Dartmouth in 1550-1 and a ‘William Holland the elder’ was disfranchised there on 9 August 1558. No evidence has been found of when he died.
