= Blackpool Sands =

Blackpool Sands may refer to:

- Blackpool Sands, Blackpool, Lancashire, England
- Blackpool Sands, Dartmouth, Devon, England
