= Scoce =

Scoce is a surname. Notable people with the surname include:

- Roger Scoce, MP for Dartmouth
- William Scoce, MP for Lostwithiel (UK Parliament constituency)
