= Mayor of Dartmouth =

Mayor of Dartmouth may refer to:

- List of mayors of Dartmouth, Nova Scotia
- Mayor of Dartmouth, Devon
