= Thomas Asshenden (elder) =

English politician

Thomas Asshenden (died c. 1393) was an English politician. He sat as MP for Dartmouth in January 1377, November 1384, 1385 and January 1390.

He was probably the son of William Asshenden (a merchant who served as mayor of Dartmouth from 1358 till 1359) by his wife Avice. By 1377, he was married to a woman called Joan. He married his second wife Agnes and is probably the father of the younger Thomas Asshenden, who also served as MP for Dartmouth.

He also served as deputy butler in all ports of Somerset and Devon from 6 February till October 1371, in Devon and Cornwall from 1371 till 1376, in Somerset and Devon from 1376 till 1382, in Somerset, Devon adn Dorset from 1382 till 1386, and in just Devon in 1386 till c. 1393; as commissioner to fortify Dartmouth in December 1374, February 1377, November 1381; commissioner of inquiry in Devon and Somerset in September 1385; commissioner to confiscate stolen merchandise in Dartmouth in February 1386; commissioner to compel restitution for seizures at sea in Devon in December 1386; havener of the Duchy of Cornwall from Michaelmas 1376 till May 1377; tax collector of Dartmouth in March 1377; searcher of Dartmouth from March 1378 till June 1379; constable of Brest from 24 May 1386 till April 1388; and collector of customs and subsidies from Bridgwater to Exeter from 28 November 1386 till 1391.
