= Painsford, Ashprington =

Historic estate in Devon, England

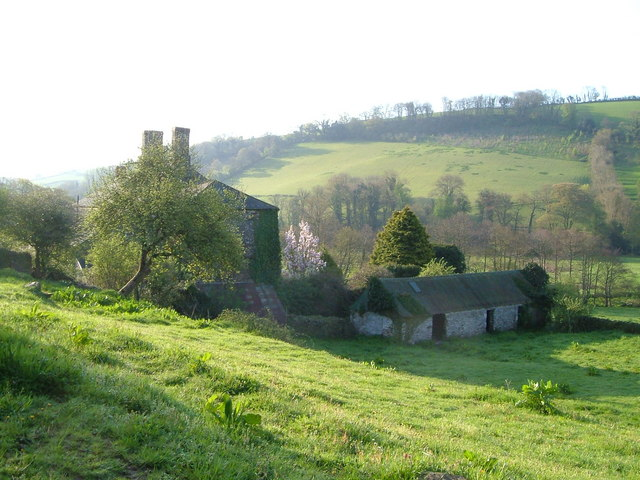
Painsford, now a farmhouse

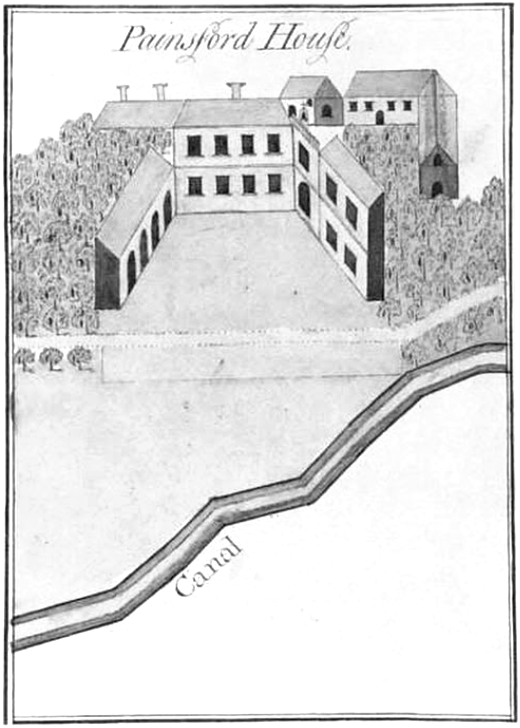
Painsford House, drawing circa 1750

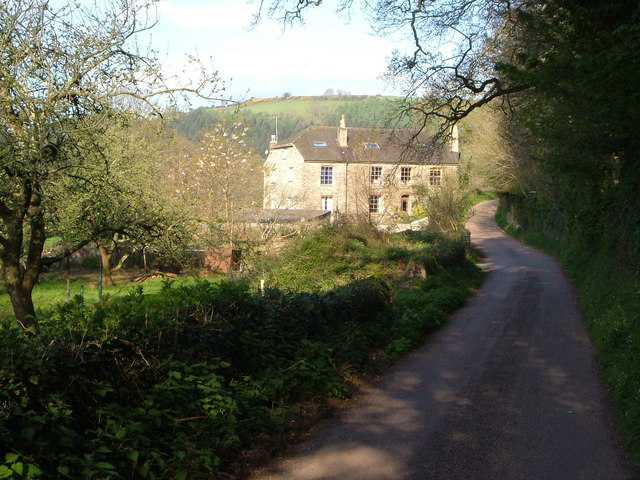
Painsford Mill

Painsford (anciently Pinford, etc.) is an historic estate in the parish of Ashprington in Devon.

== Painsford House ==
Painsford House was described as follows in 1850: "It was formerly much larger than at present, and its dilapidated chapel, though disused since the middle of the last century" (i.e. the 18th century), "still retains its pulpit, pews and altar -piece, and has a suit of armour hanging over the communion rails. The left wing of the house has a fine row of arches." In 2017 Painsford is a farmhouse much reduced in size displaying few signs of its former high status as a mansion of the Devonshire gentry. It is of an "L-shape" with rendered facade facing the garden. Ruins of the west wing survive, namely of a loggia with octagonal piers. Only the south and west walls survive of the chapel refounded by John Kellond in 1687.

== Descent ==
=== Wolhey ===
The estate is not mentioned in the Domesday Book of 1086. The earliest holder recorded by Pole (died 1635) was John Wolhey, who was seated there during the reign of King Edward III (1327–1377).

=== Piperell ===
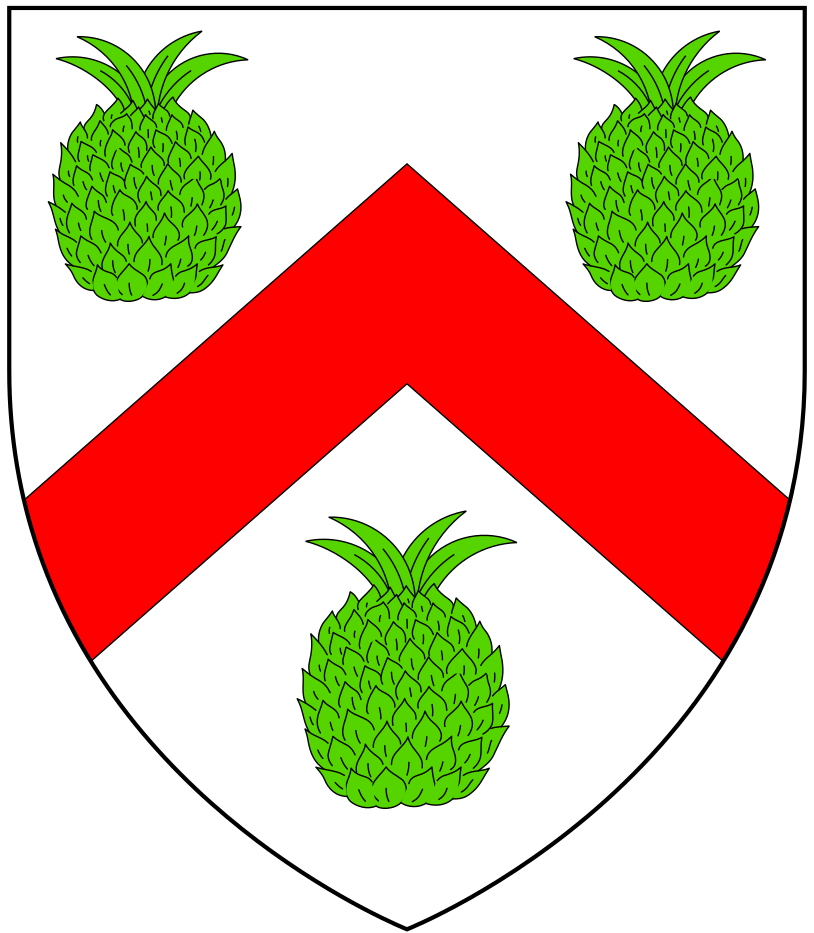
Arms of Piperell of Painsford: Argent, a chevron gules between three pineapples vert

Richard Piperell held Painsford during the reign of King Richard II (1377–1399). He was succeeded by his son Richard Piperell (died 1406/07) who died without progeny, when his heir became his sister Alis Piperell, then aged 40, the wife of her near neighbour Walter Halgewell (alias Halgawell) of Halgawell (later Halwell Combe, now Halwell), near Ashprington.

=== Halgewell ===
Painsford was held by the Halgewell family until it was purchased by John Somaster, a brother of William Somaster of Nether Exe.

=== Somaster ===
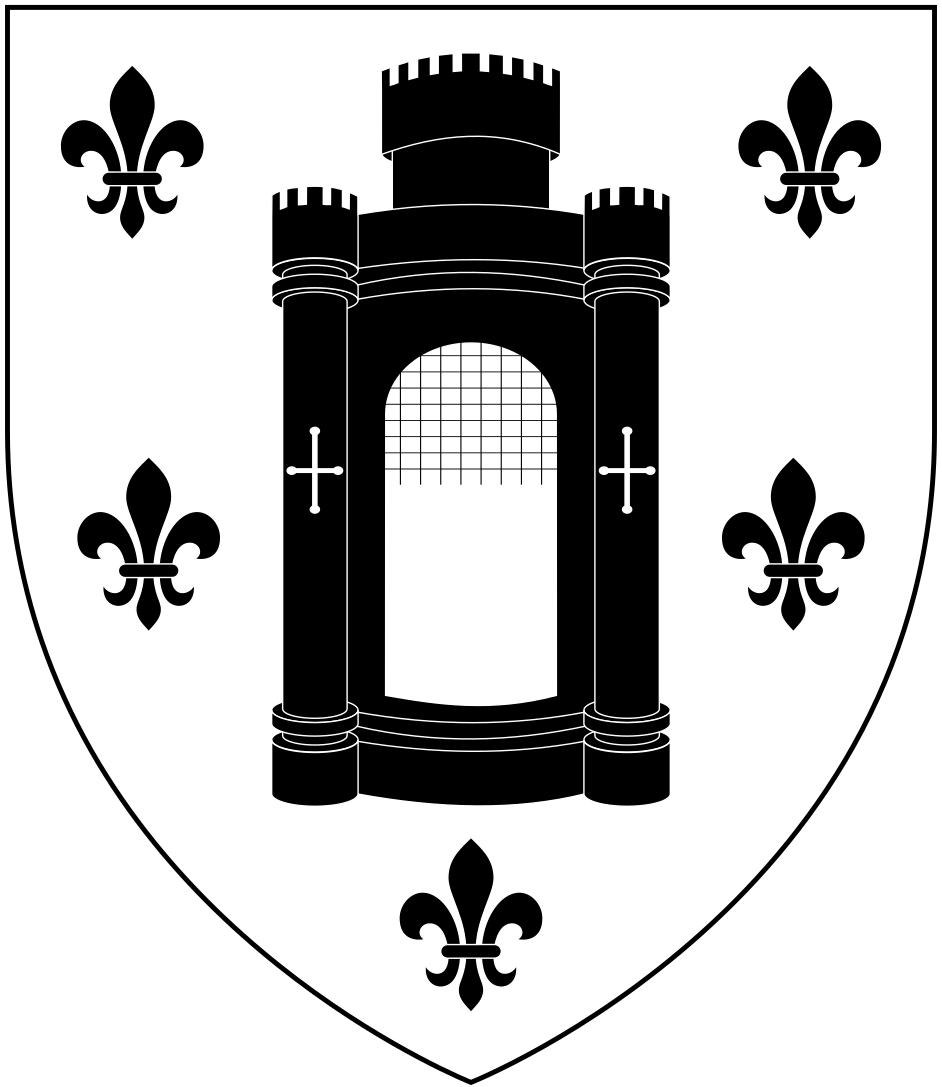
Arms of Somaster: Argent, a castle triple-towered within an orle of fleurs-de-lys sable.

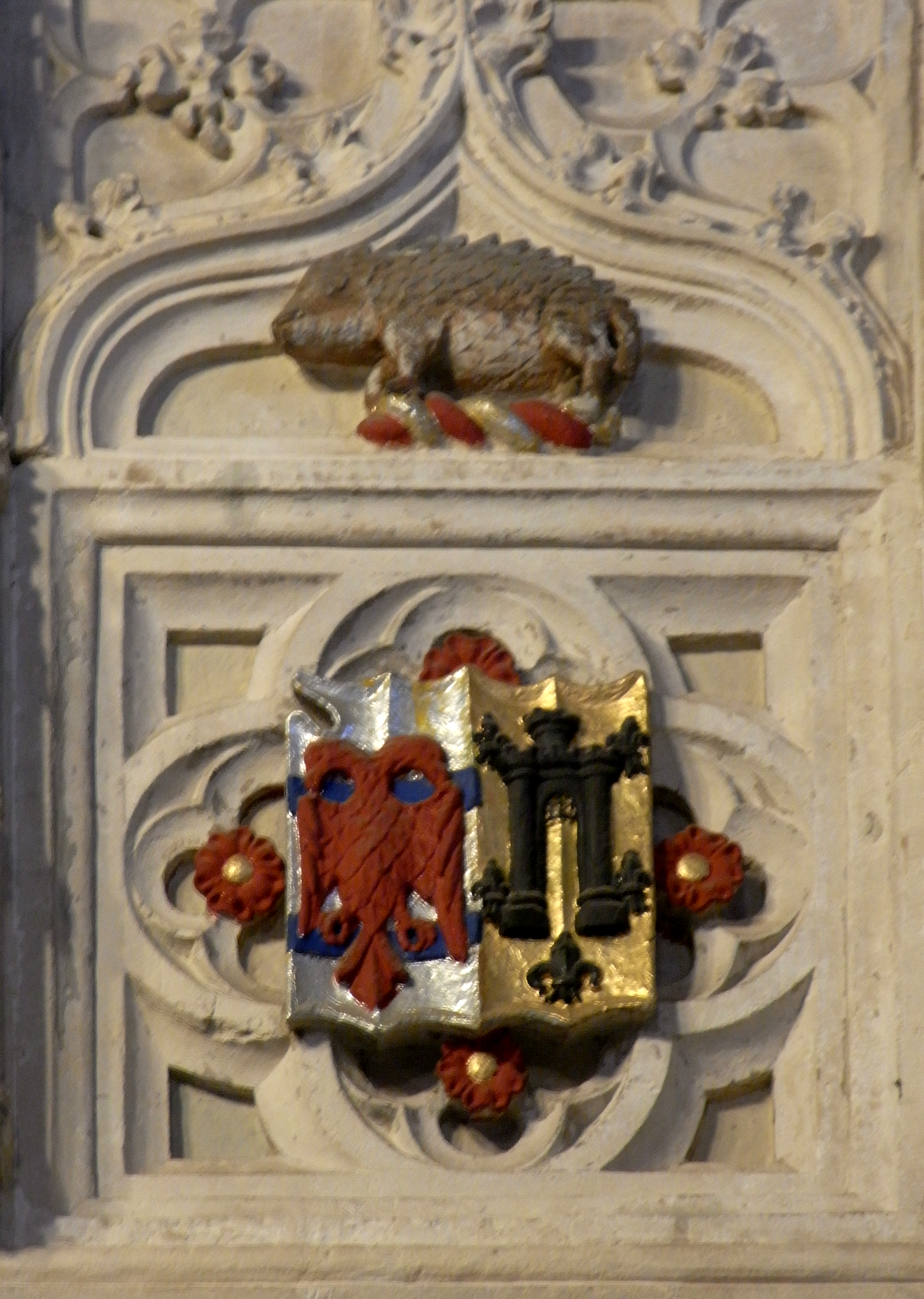
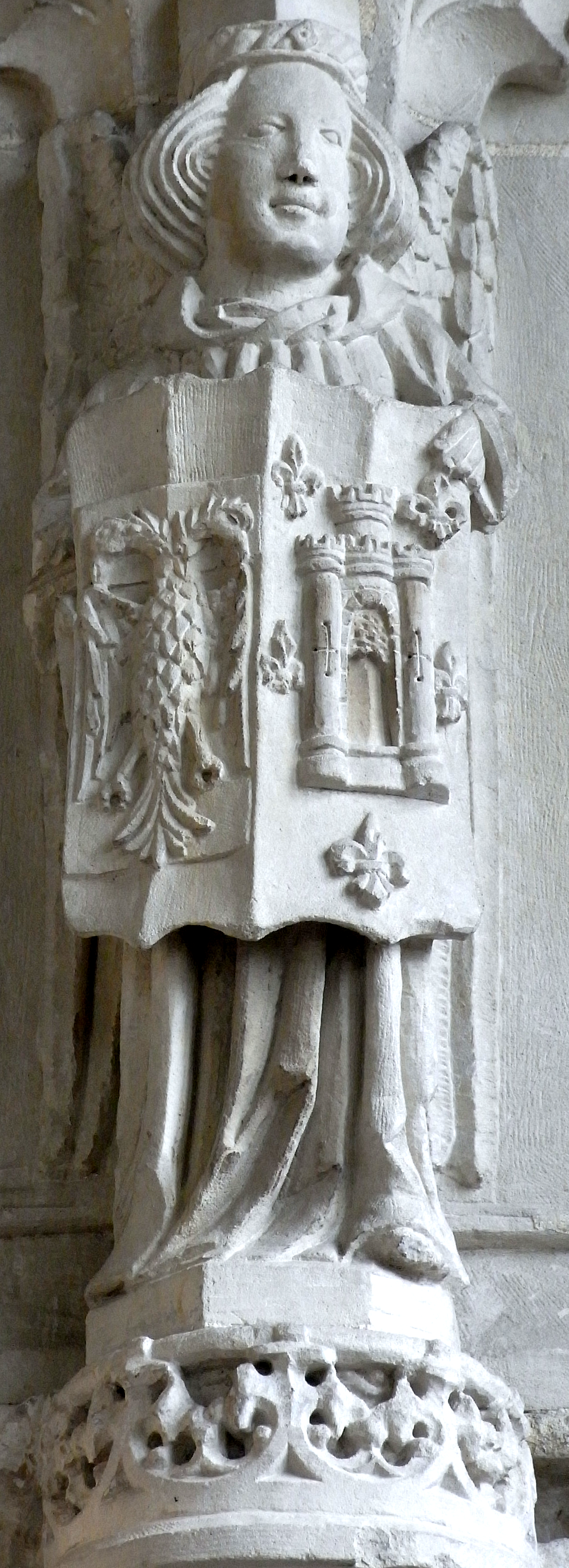
Left:Arms of Sir John Speke (died 1518) impaling Somester, arms of his 3rd wife Elizabeth Somester: Argent, a castle between three fleurs-de-lis sable, here shown as Or, a castle between five fleurs-de-lis sable. Above is the crest of Speke: A porcupine. Outside wall of Speke Chantry, Exeter Cathedral. Right: same arms displayed by a statuette of a crowned angel, within the chantry

==== John Somaster (died 1535) ====
Painsford was purchased from the Halgewell family by John Somaster (died 1535), a brother of William Somaster of Nether Exe. The pedigree of "Somaster of Painsford" was one of those submitted by the gentry families of Devon to the heralds at the 1620 Heraldic Visitation of Devon. Their arms were: Argent, a castle triple-towered within an orle of fleurs-de-lys sable. Their crest was a portcullis. The Devon historian Risdon (died 1640) suggests the surname was from the Latin Summus Magister, meaning "highest magistrate". John Somaster's aunt was Elizabeth Somester (a daughter of Adam Somaster of Widecombe and widow successively of John Coleshill and Richard Unde, both of Exeter), 3rd wife of Sir John Speke (1442–1518) of Whitelackington, Somerset and of Heywood in the parish of Wembworthy and of Bramford Speke both in Devon, Sheriff of Devon in 1517 and a Member of Parliament. The arms of Somaster thus appear sculpted in the Speke Chantry in the Chapel of St George (which he built) in Exeter Cathedral, the burial place of her husband.

John Somaster (died 1535) married Jane Dillon, a daughter of Nicholas Dillon of Chimwell in the parish of Bratton Fleming in Devon.

==== William Somaster (1507–1589) ====
William Somaster (1507–29 June 1589), son and heir, who married Katherine Fortescue, a daughter of Henry Fortescue (1492–1567) of Preston in the parish of Newton Ferrers, Devon (a younger grandson of John Fortescue of Whympston, Modbury, a Member of Parliament variously for Totnes, Tavistock and Plympton.), by his wife Elizabeth St Maur, a daughter of William St Maur lord of the Manor of North Molton, Devon. His monumental brass survives in Ashprington Church, inscribed on a brass plate as follows:

"Wylliam Sumaster of Paynesford Esquire, died the xxix of June 1589 & lyeth here buryed. Christ is my life and death my advantage".

Above are two inverted brass shields, both displaying the arms of Somaster impaling Fortescue Azure, a bend engrailed argent cotised or. By his wife he had 4 sons and 2 daughters, including:

- John Somaster of East Allington, Devon, eldest son, who married a certain Elizabeth. He was "disinherited for marrying without his father's consent".
- Rev. Thomas Somaster, 2nd son, Rector of Bere Ferrers and Archdeacon of Cornwall 3 January 1571 – 1603, died without progeny.
- Henry Somaster (died 1606) of Painsford, 3rd son and heir.
- George Somaster, 4th son, Principal of Broadgates Hall, Oxford, died without progeny

==== Henry Somaster (died 1606) ====
Henry Somaster (died 1606) of Painsford, 3rd son and heir, who in 1583 married Alice Arundell (died 1622/23), a daughter of John Arundell (died 1580) of Trerice in Cornwall, a Member of Parliament for Mitchell, Cornwall, in 1555 and 1558, and High Sheriff of Cornwall in 1573–1574, who built the present mansion house at Trerice in about 1572. Her half-brothers (by her father's second wife) were Sir John Arundell (1576 – c. 1656) of Trerice, nicknamed "Jack-for-the-King", MP for Cornwall and for Tregony and Governor of Pendennis Castle, Falmouth, during the Civil War; and Thomas Arundell of Duloe, MP for West Looe, a soldier who served in the Netherlands. By his wife he had progeny as follows:

- Sir Samuel Somaster (born 1592) of Painsford, son and heir;
- Rebeka Somaster, wife of Nicholas Burton, Lieutenant-Governor of Pendennis Castle, Falmouth, Cornwall.

==== Sir Samuel Somaster (born 1592) ====
Sir Samuel Somaster (born 1592) of Painsford, son and heir, who married Frances Strode (died 1628), a daughter of Sir William IV Strode (1562–1637) of Newnham in the parish of Plympton St Mary in Devon (whose mural monument survives in St Mary's Church, Plympton) a Member of Parliament for Devon in 1597 and 1624, for Plympton Erle in 1601, 1604, 1621 and 1625, and for Plymouth in 1614, High Sheriff of Devon from 1593 to 1594 and Deputy Lieutenant of Devon from 1599. His 2nd son was William Strode (1594–1645), MP, one of the Five Members whose impeachment and attempted unconstitutional arrest by King Charles I in the House of Commons in 1642 sparked the Civil War. Samuel Somaster married secondly to a certain Dorothy, widow of a certain Wise. He had progeny 5 daughters and 7 sons, including:

- George Somaster (born 1612), eldest son and heir.
- Henry Somaster (born 1613), 2nd son, a captain in the Earl of Manchester's Regiment of Foot.
- William Somaster (born 1615), 3rd son, a captain in the Parliamentary Navy during the Civil War.
- Samuel Somaster (born 1621), 4th son, a lieutenant in Sir Francis Drake's Regiment of Horse.
- Mary Somaster (born 1611), eldest daughter, wife of Dr Joseph Martin, LLD, Chancellor of Exeter Cathedral and Judge of the Court of Admiralty in Devon.

==== George Somaster (born 1612) ====
George Somaster (born 1612), eldest son and heir.

=== Kellond ===
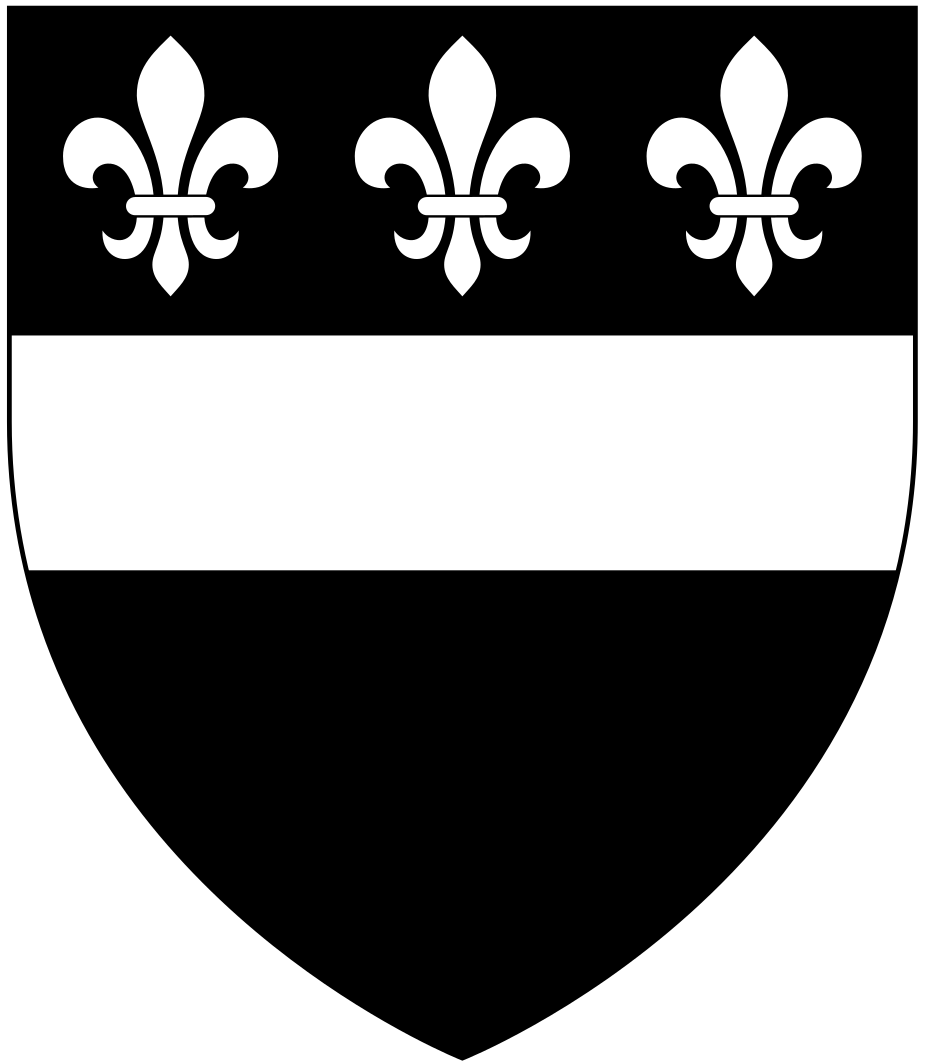
Arms of Kellond: Sable, a fess argent in chief three fleurs-de-lys of the last

==== John I Kellond (1609–1679) ====
John Kellond (1609–1679), Sheriff of Devon in 1666, purchased Painsford in 1647. He was a son of John Kellond (1575/6-1623) of Totnes, a son of Walter Kellond (died 1592) of Totnes, merchant. He married Susanna Fownes (died 1648/49), a daughter of Thomas Fownes (died 1638) of Plymouth, Mayor of Plymouth in 1619, whose descendant Henry Fownes-Luttrell (c.1722-1780) of Nethway, Brixham, in 1746 married Margaret Luttrell, heiress of Dunster Castle in Somerset. The couple's monument survives in Ashprington Church. One of his younger sons, Thomas Kellond (1636–1686) went to Boston, Massachusetts.

==== John II Kellond (1635–1692) ====
John II Kellond (1635–1692) of Painsford, eldest son and heir, a Member of Parliament for Totnes in March 1679, 1681 and 1685. and Sheriff of Devon in 1683. He refounded the chapel at Painsford in 1687. He married his first cousin Bridget Fownes (born 1641), sister of John Fownes (1640–1670) of Whitley, Devon. His monument survives in Ashprington Church. His eldest son, who predeceased him, was John Kellond (1666–1685) who died unmarried aged 19 at St Mary, Savoy, and was buried in the Church of St Bartholomew-the-Great in the City of London, where his monument survives on the south wall of the choir. His maternal grandparents, Thomas and Hester Fownes, lived in that parish for forty years or more. The monument comprises an oval stone draped tablet with three cherub heads, above which are a heraldic shield displaying the arms of Kellond: Sable a fess and in chief three fleurs-de-lis argent, on the fess a crescent for difference of a second son, and a crest: A demi heraldic tiger salient or maned argent. It is inscribed in Latin as follows:

M(emoriae) S(acrum) Hæc juxta marmora siti sunt cineres juvenis amabilis Johannis Kellond Armigeri a lachrymis temperate parentes Flebunt interitum quem tegunt Marmor et cælum Nec Lampade vigilate perenni Custodiant urnam quas coluit virtutes Candor et Innocentia Filius Fuit olim dilectissimus Solatium fuit jam desiderium Johannis Kellond Armig: de Painsford in comitatu Devoniæ et tritissimæ Matris Bridgettæ, Johannis Fownes nuper de Whilley Armiger: in eodem agro sororis ex utraq(ue) familia illustri Proles non Ignobilis Jam juxta Reliquias Avunculi sui Thomaæ Fownes de hac Parochia quondam Ar(migeri) Cui sanguine fuit Agnatus Hic vicino etiam cinere quiescit. Obiit 2do die Julii 1685 Salutis Ætatis suæ Anno 19°.

Which may be translated as:

"Near this marble are laid the ashes of a lovable youth, John Kellond, Esquire. Restrain yourselves from tears, ye parents, marble and sky will weep for the death they cover; watch not with an ever burning torch; let the virtues, simplicity and innocence which he cultivated guard his tomb. The dearly loved son was once the comfort, but now the loss of John Kellond Esq. of Painsford, in the county of Devon, and of his sorrowing mother Bridget, sister of John Fownes, late of Whilley, Esquire, in the same county, a not unworthy offspring of each illustrious stock. He now rests here near the remains of his uncle Thomas Fownes, formerly of this parish Esquire, to whom he was close in blood and is now close also in his tomb. He died on the 2nd day of July in the year of salvation 1685 (and) of his age 19".

==== Charles Kellond (1660–1695) ====
Charles Kellond (1660–1695) of Painsford, eldest son and heir, a Member of Parliament for Totnes in 1680–81. He married firstly in 1684 Margaret Drewe (died 1693/94), a daughter and co-heiress of Thomas Drewe of The Grange, Broadhembury in Devon.

==== John III Kellond (1690–1712) ====
John III Kellond (1690–1712), only son, who died unmarried aged 22. As he was predeceased by his three sisters, Painsford was inherited by his aunt Susanna Kellond (1676/7-176), wife of William Courtenay of Tremere, Lanivet in Cornwall.

=== Courtenay ===
Arms of Courtenay: Or, three torteaux a label azure

Painsford was inherited by Susanna Kellond (1676/7-176), aunt of John III Kellond (1690–1712) of Painsford and wife of William Courtenay of Tremore in the parish of Lanivet in Cornwall, a junior branch of Courtenay of Powderham in Devon, itself a cadet line of the Courtenay Earls of Devon of Tiverton Castle, feudal barons of Plympton and feudal barons of Okehampton.

=== Boyle ===
Arms of Boyle: Per bend embattled argent and gules

Hon. Sir Courtenay Boyle (1770–1844), KCH, was an officer of the Royal Navy during the French Revolutionary Wars and in 1807 served as a Member of Parliament for Bandon. He was the 3rd but 2nd surviving son of Edmund Boyle, 7th Earl of Cork by his first wife Anne Courtenay, second daughter and co-heiress of Kellond Courtenay of Painsford and a niece of John Montagu, 4th Earl of Sandwich. On 16 April 1799 he married Caroline Amelia Poyntz, a daughter of William Poyntz of Midgham House in the parish of Thatcham, Berkshire. The estate of Midgham had been purchased by Stephen Poyntz (1685–1750), a diplomat born at Cornhill in the City of London. The ancient and prominent Poyntz family first appeared in England in the late 12th century as feudal barons of Curry Mallet in Somerset, and were later seated at Iron Acton in Gloucestershire. By his wife he had 3 sons and 3 daughters.

According to the 1810 Additions to Risdon, Painsford was sold by the Earl of Cork (Boyle family) and "Mr Poyntz". Lysons (1822) clarifies this by stating: "A few years ago it was sold by the Countess of Cork and Mr. Poyntz, as representatives of the Courtenays of Painsford, to Mr. Philip Michelmore, the present proprietor".

==== Michelmore ====
Painsford remained a seat of the Michelmore family until 1960. In 1878 it had been let to Richard Coaker.
