= Thomas Asshenden (younger) =

English politician

Thomas Asshenden was an English politician. He sat as MP for Dartmouth in 1420, 1422, 1429 and 1437, bailiff of Dartmouth from Michaelmas 1422 till 1423 and Mayor of Dartmouth from 1428 till 1429.

He was probably the son of Thomas Asshenden. By 1434, he was married to a woman called Katherine.
