= Nathaniel Herne (1629–1679) =

English politician (1629–1679)

Sir Nathaniel Herne (c. 1629 – 10 August 1679) was an English politician. He sat as MP for Dartmouth in March 1679.

He was the fifth son of Nicholas Herne, the first son of his second wife. He was the brother of Joseph Herne. On 1 September 1656, he married with £5000, Judith, the daughter of John Frederick and they had three sons (Nathaniel, Frederick, and Thomas Herne) and two daughters. He was knighted on 9 August 1674.
