= John More (c. 1520 – c. 1576) =

English politician

John More (c. 1520 – c. 1576) was an English politician.

He was a member (MP) of the parliament of England for West Looe in 1559 and Dartmouth in 1563.
