= John Dunn (1820–1860) =

British Conservative politician

Member of Parliament for Dartmouth
- In office 8 August 1859 – 10 September 1860 Serving with Kenneth Macaulay
- Preceded by: Edward Wyndham Harrington Schenley
- Succeeded by: John Hardy

Personal details
- Born: 1820
- Died: 10 September 1860 (aged 40)
- Party: Conservative

John Dunn (1820 – 10 September 1860) was a British Conservative politician.

After unsuccessfully contesting Totnes at the 1859 general election, Dunn was elected Conservative MP for Dartmouth at a by-election in 1859—caused by the previous election of Edward Wyndham Harrington Schenley being declared void due to bribery and corruption. He held the seat until his death in 1860.

Parliament of the United Kingdom
Preceded by Edward Wyndham Harrington Schenley	Member of Parliament for Dartmouth; 1859–1860	Succeeded by John Hardy
