= John Hawley (died 1408) =

Member of the Parliament of England

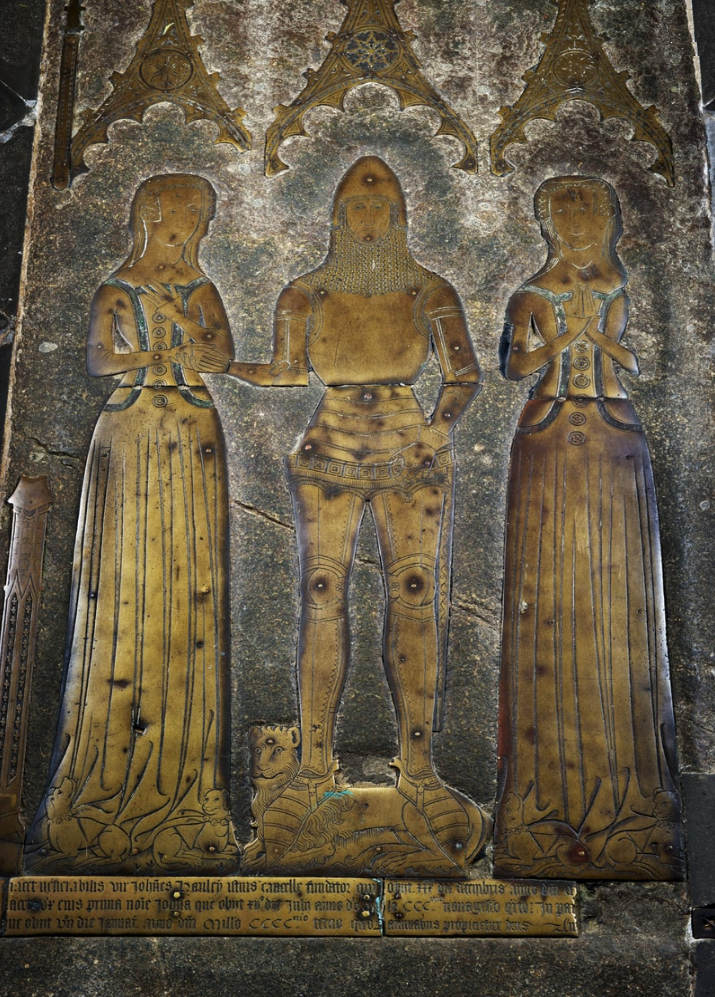
Monumental brass of John Hawley (d.1408) in St Saviour's Church, Dartmouth. He is dressed as a fully-armed knight, flanked by his two wives

Arms of Hawley: Argent, three hunting horns and a broad arrow sable in pale feathers and head or

John Hawley (c. 1340/50 – 30 December 1408) (aliter "Hauley" and called "the elder") of Dartmouth in Devon, was a wealthy ship owner who served fourteen times as Mayor of Dartmouth and was elected four times as a Member of Parliament for Dartmouth. He is reputed to have been the inspiration for Chaucer's "schipman". His magnificent monumental brass survives in St Saviour's Church, Dartmouth.

== Origins ==
He was the son of John Hawley of Dartmouth. His family reportedly came from the hamlet of Allaleigh and this may account for the origins of his name.

== Career ==
He was Mayor of Dartmouth on fourteen occasions between 1374 and 1401 and was elected MP for Dartmouth four times, in 1390, 1393, 1394 and 1402.

Hawley was both a merchant and licensed privateer though he was often accused of piracy. He conducted a number of naval operations in the English Channel and briefly held the post of deputy to the Admiral of England under King Henry IV (1399-1413). He organised the defence of Dartmouth in 1404 against an attack by a Breton fleet, which culminated in the Battle of Blackpool Sands.

== Marriage and progeny ==
He married twice:

- Firstly to a certain Joan (died 12 July 1394)
- Secondly to a certain Alice (died 7 Jan. 1403), by whom he had a son:
  - John Hawley (d. 1436), (called "the Younger"), 12 times a Member of Parliament for Dartmouth. He is said to have married Emmeline (or Elizabeth or Margaret) Tresilian, said to have been an "idiot", the divorced wife of John Arundel, MP, and daughter and heiress of Sir Robert Tresilian (d.1388), Chief Justice of the King's Bench, executed for treason following condemnation by the Merciless Parliament of 1388, whose wardship and lands had been purchased by his father John Hawley the Elder. His daughter and eventual heiress Elizabeth Hawley (d.1457) married John Copleston (d.1458) of Copplestone in the parish of Colebrooke, Devon, three times a Member of Parliament for Devon.

== Death and burial ==
He died in December 1408 and was buried in St Saviour's Church, Dartmouth, where survives his magnificent monumental brass of John Hawley (d.1408) in St Saviour's Church, Dartmouth, showing him dressed as a fully-armed knight, flanked by his two wives.
