= Thomas Hankyn =

English politician

Thomas Hankyn was an English politician who sat as MP for Dartmouth in May 1421.
