= Nicholas Adams (died 1584) =

English politician

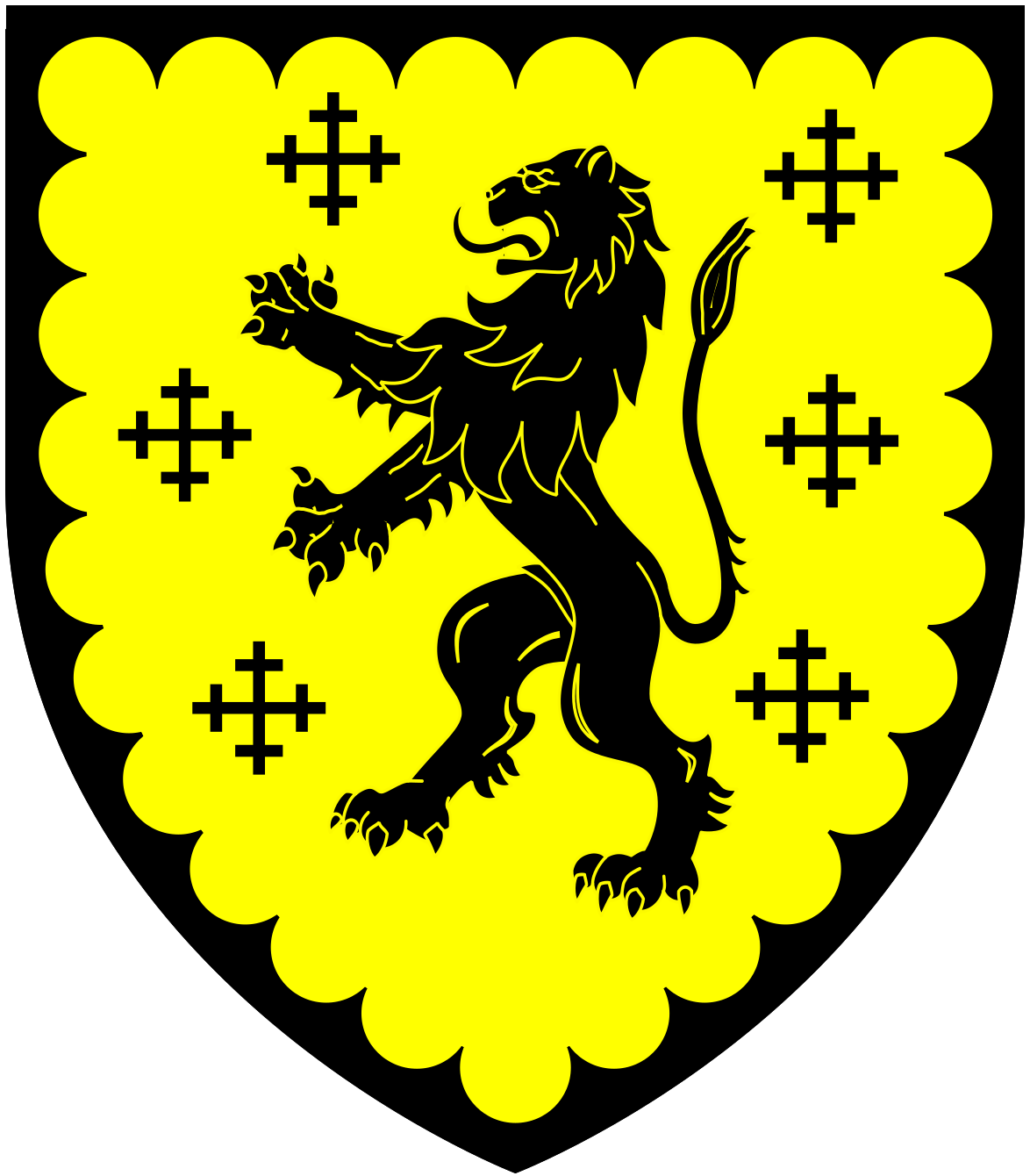
Arms of Adams of Tunstall: Or, a lion rampant between six crosses crosslet within a bordure engrailed sable

Nicholas Adams, (alias Bodrugan) (fl. 1521 – c. 1584), of the Middle Temple, London and Townstal (alias Tunstall), near Dartmouth in Devon, was an English Member of Parliament.

== Career ==
He was the 1st son of John Adams of Venn, Devon and Catherine, daughter of John Stebbing alias Bodrugan of Dartmouth. He was educated in Middle Temple, London. He held the office of Counsel to Dartmouth by 1542-51 or later. Adams was a Member of Parliament for West Looe in 1547, and Dartmouth in March 1553, October 1553, April 1554 and November 1554.

Adams had his first experience of Parliament in 1547, when he sat for Cornwall. He did not show any significant activity during his first membership in Parliament. But in his second session he was marked with the publication of the treatise An Epitome of the title that the kynges Maiestie of Englande hath to the souereigntie of Scotlande, supporting the union of the two kingdoms. During his second membership "his own position was reinforced by his connection with the two knights for Devon, his brother-in-law John Fulford and Sir Peter Carew".

== Personal life ==
Nicholas Adams was married twice, the first wife was Cecily, daughter of Sir John Fulford of Fulford, Devon. He married his second wife Mary by 21 January 1547.
