= List of mayors of Dartmouth, Devon =

Mayors in Dartmouth Devon

Dartmouth received borough status in 1341 with the right to elect a mayor. In 1974 the town became part of South Hams District. There is still a Town Council and a mayor, but with reduced powers.

The following have been mayors of Dartmouth, Devon, England:

== 14th century ==
- 1374–75: John Hawley, MP for Dartmouth, 1390, 1393, 1394 and 1402
- 1376–77: John Hawley
- 1378–79: John Hawley
- 1382–83: John Hawley
- 1385–86: John Hawley
- 1387–89: John Hawley
- 1390–91: John Hawley
- 1392–95: John Hawley
- 1397–99: John Hawley
- 1400–01: John Hawley

== 16th Century ==
- 1547–48: Nicholas Roupe, MP for Dartmouth 1553
- 1551-52: Gilbert Roupe, MP for Dartmouth 1553
- 1554–55: Nicholas Roupe, MP for Dartmouth 1553
- 1593: Nicholas Hayman, MP for Dartmouth 1586 and 1593
- 1597–98: Thomas Holland, MP for Dartmouth, 1593, 1604 and 1614

== 17th century ==
- 1602: Nicholas Hayman
- c.1620: Andrew Voysey, MP for Dartmouth, 1640

[William Plumleigh] Recvr. Dartmouth 1610–11,2 mayor 1617–18, 1625–6, 1632–3, 1641-2

== 20th century ==
- 1900-01 Thomas Wilton
- 1901-02 William Philip Ditcham
- 1902-03 John William Medway (Liberal)
- 1903-06 Richard Burford Seale
- 1906-10 John Brown
- 1910-11 Edward Ethelbert Lort Phillips
- 1911-14 Charles Peek
- 1914-18 Thomas Wilton
- 1918-19 Sir Thomas Wilton
- 1919-21 Charles Peek
- 1921-22 Algernon Joseph Yorke
- 1922-23 Sir Alfred G. Bourne
- 1923-29 Dr Henry J. Campbell
- 1929-32 James Harry Smith
- 1932-33 George Henry Marshall
- 1933-36 Ernest Albert Travers
- 1936-37 William Thomas Pillar
- 1937-38 George Henry Marshall
- 1938-45 William George Row
- 1945-46 Herbert George Middleton
- 1946-47 Frank Scardifield
- 1947-50 Bertie Lavers
- 1950-51 James Clifford S.R. Stoneman
- 1951-53 Albert Montague William Chapman
- 1953-54 Harold John Adams
- 1954-56 Dorothy Holwill, 1st woman mayor
- 1956-57 Bertie Lavers
- 1957-58 Norman Hewson
- 1958-60 Harold Charles Lloyd
- 1960-61 James William Lee Palin
- 1961-62 Richard Martin Hoare
- 1962-63 Dorothy Holwill
- 1963-65 Eric S. Rimmer
- 1965-66 Margaret V.M. Keane
- 1966-67 Harold G. White
- 1967-68 Robert Middleton
- 1968-69 Eric J. Cook
- 1969-70 Albert J. Mashford
- 1970-71 Eric J. Cook
- 1971-73 Frank C. Mullett
- 1973-74Irene Ethel Frances Scawn
- 1974-75 Albert J. Mashford
- 1975-76 Brenda Bradley Breakwell
- 1976-77 Brian Alfred Goss
- 1977-78 Richard Martin Hoare
- 1978-80 Dennis Arthur Woods
- 1980-81 Irene Ethel Frances Scawn
- 1981-83 Donald William Rablin Webb
- 1983-85 Beryl Mary Calder
- 1985-86 Leslie William Savage
- 1986-89 Donald William Rablin Webb
- 1989-90 Bryan Martin Measures
- 1990-93 Brian J. Edgington
- 1993-95 Jack Cutter
- 1995-97 Margaret A Roberts
- 1997-99 Paul J. Darby
- 1999-2000 Melvyn Stone

== 21st century ==
- 2000–05: Richard Rendle
- 2005–06: Peter Norton
- 2006–07: Iris Pritchard
- 2007–08: Iris Pritchard
- 2008–09: Debbie Morris
- 2010–11: Richard Rendle
- 2011–13: Paul Allen
- 2014–15: Rob M Lyon
- 2016–17: Rob M Lyon
- 2017–18: Richard Cooke
- 2018–19: Rob M Lyon
- 2019-20: Graham Webb
- 2020-21: Graham Webb
- 2021-22: Graham Webb
- 2022-23: David Wells
- 2023-24: David Wells
- 2024-25: David Wells
- 2025-26: Andrea Cates
