= Thomas Holland (MP) =

English merchant and politician

- Died: Circa 1618
- Occupations: Merchant and Politician
- Years active: 1593–1611
- Known for: Member of Parliament for Dartmouth
- Children: At least one son and daughter
- Parent(s): Freeman of Dartmouth (father), Anne Holland (mother)

Thomas Holland (died ca. 1618) was an English merchant and politician who sat in the House of Commons at various times between 1593 and 1611.

Holland was the son of a freeman of Dartmouth and his wife Anne Holland of Wood Street London. In 1592 he played a major part in the purchase of a Spanish carrack, the Madre de Dios, which had been brought into Dartmouth Harbour. He was elected Member of Parliament for Dartmouth in 1593. He was Mayor of Dartmouth in 1597. Over the years, he leased land and property from the town of Dartmouth and lent large sums of money to the corporation. In 1604 and 1614 he was elected MP for Dartmouth again.

Holland made his will in November 1618 and died by 9 March 1619 when the will was proved.

Holland was married and had at least one son and daughter.

Parliament of England
Preceded by Robert Papworth; Richard Drewe	Member of Parliament for Dartmouth; 1593; With: Nicholas Sapman	Succeeded by John Osborn ? William Bastard
Preceded by John Traherne; William Bastard	Member of Parliament for Dartmouth; 1604–1611; With: Thomas Gurney	Succeeded by Robert Matthew; William Nyell
