= Nicholas Hayman =

English politician

Nicholas Hayman (died 1606), of Totnes; later of Dartmouth, Devon, was an English merchant and politician.

He was a member (MP) of the parliament of England for Totnes in 1586 and for Dartmouth in 1593.

He was Mayor of Totnes in 1589–1590 and Mayor of Dartmouth between 1593 and 1602. He was the father of Robert Hayman.
