= Nicolas Langmede =

16th-century English politician

Nicolas Langmede or Longmede (by 1489 – ?), of Dartmouth and Topsham, Devon and London, was an English politician.

He was a member (MP) of the parliament of England for Dartmouth in 1529.
