= William Bast (MP) =

14th-century English politician

William Bast of Dartmouth, Devon, was an English politician.

Bast was a member of parliament for Dartmouth in September 1388.
