= Edward Wyndham Harrington Schenley =

British Liberal politician and military officer (1799–1878)

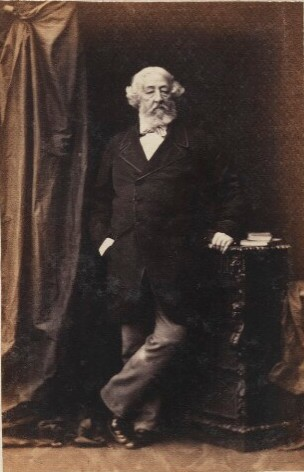
- Edward William Harrington Schenley, 1861 photograph

Member of Parliament for Dartmouth
- In office 30 April 1859 – 27 July 1859
- Preceded by: James Caird
- Succeeded by: John Dunn

Personal details
- Born: 1799 Woolwich, Kent
- Died: 31 January 1878 (aged 78) St George Hanover Square, London
- Party: Liberal
- Spouse(s): Catherine Inglis (m. 1823; died 1826) Jane Maria Pole (m. 1833; died 1837) Mary Elizabeth Croghan (m. 1842–1878)
- Children: 12

Edward Wyndham Harrington Schenley (1799 – 31 January 1878) was a British Liberal politician, military officer and husband of Mary Elizabeth Croghan, 19th century philanthropist of Pittsburgh, Pennsylvania.

== Early life ==
Schenley was born in Woolwich, Kent in 1799. Schenley's father was an artillery officer who died in Cadiz, Spain in 1813.

== Career ==
Schenley was a volunteer in the Peninsular War and joined the Rifle Brigade as a 15-year-old lieutenant in 1814. Subsequently wounded in the Battle of Waterloo, he became friends with Lord Byron.

Schenley served the Crown in Latin America. In 1825 he was appointed Vice Counsel in Guatemala, and in 1828 he became Counsel in Venezuela. In 1836 he was appointed as arbitrator to the British and Spanish joint commission addressing slavery in Cuba.

Schenley was elected Liberal MP for Dartmouth at the 1859 general election, but was three months later unseated after an election petition committee found his win had been secured through bribery and corruption.

== Personal life ==
Schenley married three times, all via elopement. He married his first wife, Catherine Inglis, in Leghorn (Livorno) Italy in 1823. He lived with her in Edinburgh, Scotland for several years, and she died in Havana, Cuba three years later. A son from their union died.

=== Second marriage ===
On 12 February 1833, he married a second time to Jane Maria Pole, daughter of Sir William Templer Pole, 7th Baronet and Charlotte Fraser. Before Jane's death on 23 April 1837, they had one child:

- Frances "Fanny" Inglis Schenley (born c. 1834), who married Charles Cramond Dick, son of George Fairbairn Dick and Adriana Sophia Mylius, in 1859.

=== Third marriage ===
In 1841, after falling ill en route to the United States, he stopped in Staten Island, New York to recuperate at the home of his sister in law Lydia Inglis McLeod, who ran a school for girls. It was there that Schenley met the 15-year-old Mary Elizabeth Croghan (1826–1903), daughter of William Croghan and Mary O'Hara. Mary's grandfather, James O'Hara, settled in Pittsburgh prior to the American Revolution in 1773 and became a substantial landowner and businessman in that city. They eloped and were married in New York in early 1842 against the wishes of her widowed father, and they then moved to England. Together, they had eleven children:

- Elizabeth Pole Schenley (c. 1842–1915), who married Hon. Ralph Harbord, son of Edward Harbord, 3rd Baron Suffield and Emily Harriet Shirley, in 1865.
- William Croghan Schenley (d. 1846)
- Lily Schenley (b. 1843)
- Jane Inglis Schenley (1844–1925), who married Rev. Henry Woodward Crofton, son of Rev. William Crofton and Melisina Woodward, in 1875.
- Henrietta Agnes Schenley (b. 1847)
- Clarence Edward Paget Schenley (b. 1850)
- Alice Schenley (1853–1930), who married Lt.-Col. Frederick Augustus Gore, son of General Hon. Sir Charles Stephen Gore (a son of the 2nd Earl of Arran) and Sarah Rachel Fraser (a daughter of James Fraser), in 1886.
- Richard E. M. Schenley (b. 1853)
- Nina Schenley (b. 1855)
- Hermione Octavia Croghan Schenley (c. 1859–1942), who married Edward Law, 5th Baron Ellenborough, in 1906.
- George Alfred Schenley (1861–1934), who married Grace Atkinson Hughes, daughter of Captain. John William St. John Hughes and Jessie Ann Atkinson Gardner, in 1887.

Schenley died on 31 January 1878 at St George Hanover Square.

Parliament of the United Kingdom
Preceded by James Caird	Member of Parliament for Dartmouth; April 1859–July 1859	Succeeded by John Dunn
