= Battle of Blackpool Sands =

French raid in Devon, England

Coordinates: 50°19′10″N 3°36′34″W

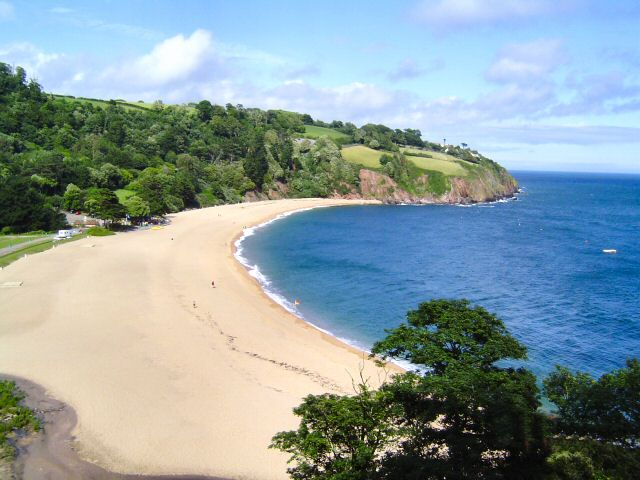
- Blackpool Sands, Dartmouth
Date	April or May 1404
Location	Blackpool Sands near Dartmouth, Devon, England
Result	Defeat of William du Chastel's fleet

Combatants
William du Chastel's fleet	John Hawley's defensive forces

Arms of du Chastel

Arms of de Jaille

The Battle of Blackpool Sands was the result of an attempted French raid on the port of Dartmouth, South Devon, England, in April or May 1404. Local forces defeated the raiders, taking a number of prisoners and killing the French commander, William du Chastel.

== Background ==
The early years of the 15th century were a period of extensive naval activity in the English Channel. In August 1403, William du Chastel led a raid on Plymouth which caused substantial damage. In October 1403, a fleet organised by John Hawley of Dartmouth and Thomas Norton of Bristol seized seven merchant vessels in the Channel and in November 1403, a revenge raid was launched on Brittany by Sir William Wilford, capturing 40 ships and causing considerable damage ashore. Despite the lateness of the season, the French under Count Waleran of St. Pol launched an attack on the Isle of Wight in December but were beaten off by local forces. The following spring, there were French raids on Portland and Weymouth.

== The French fleet ==
In April or May 1404, William du Chastel assembled a fleet of 300 ships at St. Malo in Brittany. He embarked 2000 knights and men-at-arms, plus light infantry and crossbowmen. He had two vice-admirals, the Lords of Chateaubriand and de Jaille. Discipline, however, was poor and, on the first day after sailing, part of the fleet attacked some allied Spanish wineships. Although order was restored, parts of the fleet broke away, leaving du Chastel to sail on towards his target of Dartmouth with reduced forces. On arriving off Blackpool Sands, a wide beach approximately 3 miles southwest of Dartmouth near the village of Stoke Fleming, he dropped anchor and waited for six days to allow his fleet to reassemble.

== English defence ==
The period of waiting forced on the French fleet allowed John Hawley, local merchant, privateer and former Mayor of Dartmouth, to organise the defence of the town. Local men were joined by troops from inland as well as a number of local women, mustering a force alleged by French sources to number 6000 in total, though Norman Longmate considers this to be "grossly exaggerated". They prepared a fortified position at Blackpool Sands consisting of a water-filled ditch crossed by a narrow causeway and awaited the French assault. John Hawley does not seem to have taken part in the battle. The commander of the English is unknown. Norman Longmate says that the Earl of Warwick advised Hawley on the defensive preparations but not that he was present at the battle. Juliet Barker states that Sir John Cornwaille was responsible for defeating the French, though she does not seem to have detailed knowledge of the battle as she places it at Blackpool in Lancashire.

== The battle ==
After six days, the French fleet had not fully reassembled. Du Chastel and de Jaille conferred (Chateaubriand appears to have been absent) and decided to land and attack the English with the men they had at hand, which apparently consisted of only 200 men-at-arms. Du Chastel felt that the English position should be flanked, but de Jaille insisted on a frontal assault, accusing his fellow admiral of being afraid. Insulted, du Chastel ordered an immediate attack.

The French disembarked and formed up to attack. Contrary to their usual practice, they did not deploy an advance screen of crossbowmen and the men-at-arms led the attack. As they advanced, they were shot at by English archers behind the ditch and pelted with stones by local women in the army. The main assault was made against the causeway but the French could not force the English back. An attempt was made to wade the ditch and, although some drowned, others succeeded in crossing. They were, however, unable to gain a foothold and were forced back. Eventually, the French gave up and attempted to retreat to their ships. Du Chastel, refusing to withdraw, was killed. Numbers of French were killed as they fled and a hundred prisoners were taken, including three lords and 22 knights. Among the captured were two of du Chastel's brothers.

== Aftermath ==
News of the victory was sent to London and a service of thanksgiving was held in Westminster Abbey, attended by the king. On 25 May, Henry IV asked the Mayor of Dartmouth to send five of the prisoners to Nottingham for interrogation. He had discovered a plot against him by Maud, Countess of Oxford, which involved a French force being landed and wished to know whether there was any connection with the Dartmouth raid. A Welsh esquire had also been captured, so possible connections to Owain Glyndŵr's revolt needed to be investigated.

The battle had no lasting impact. There is an unconfirmed suggestion that Tanneguy du Chastel led a further, more successful, raid on Dartmouth later in the year to avenge his brother. Elsewhere on the Channel coast, French raids continued in 1404 and into 1405.
