= Spafford =

Spafford may refer to:

== People ==
- Belle S. Spafford (1895–1982), American president of the Relief Society
- David Spafford (born c. 1965), American university sports administrator
- Gene Spafford (born 1956), American professor of computer science at Purdue University
- Horatio Spafford (1828–1888), American religious leader and author of the hymn "It Is Well With My Soul"
- Michael Spafford (1935–2022), American artist
- Patricia Spafford Smith (1925–2002), American politician
- Ronnie Spafford (1928–2014), British army officer and philatelist
- Suzy Spafford (born 1945), American cartoonist, creator of "Suzy'z Zoo"

== Places ==
=== United States ===
- Spafford, Minnesota, an unincorporated community
- Spafford, New York, a town

== Other uses ==
- Spafford (band), a band from Prescott, Arizona, United States
