= Allaleigh =

Hamlet in Devon, England

Coordinates: 50.371°N 3.676°W

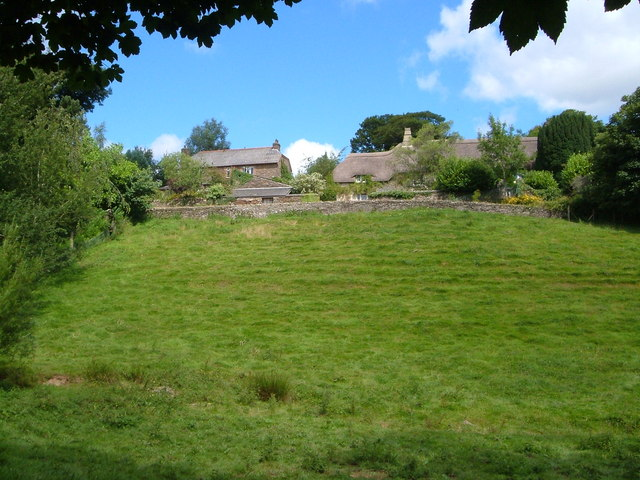
- Peeks Farm, Allaleigh

- Location within Devon
- OS grid reference: SX8053
- Shire county: Devon
- Region: South West
- Country: England
- Sovereign state: United Kingdom
- Police: Devon and Cornwall
- Fire: Devon and Somerset
- Ambulance: South Western

Allaleigh is a hamlet in Devon, England.
