= John Lacche =

English politician

John Lacche or Lecche (fl. 1380–1388) of Dartmouth, Devon, was an English politician.

He was a member (MP) of the parliament of England for Dartmouth in January 1380, 1381, October 1382, February 1383 and February 1388.
