= John Trevanion (merchant) =

English politician

John Trevanion (1483 – 1539 or later) was an English merchant and local administrator of Dartmouth, Devon.

Trevanion was chosen as Mayor of Dartmouth in 1512 and was again mayor in 1518–19, 1537–38 and 1538–39.

He was a Member of the Parliament of England for Dartmouth in 1529.

He married Joan, who was the widow of another Dartmouth merchant, Richard Holland.
