= Robert More (MP for Dartmouth) =

English politician

Robert More (fl. 1386) was an English politician.

More was a Member of Parliament for Dartmouth in 1386.
