= Blackpool Sands, Dartmouth =

Beach in Devon, England

Blackpool Sands
- Beach
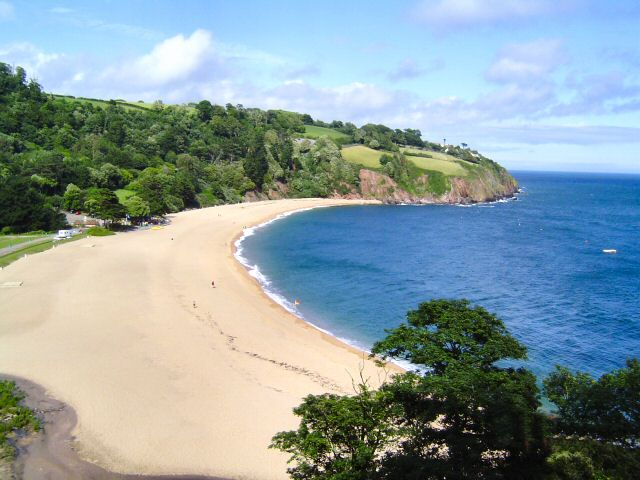

- Location within Devon
- Coordinates: 50°19′10″N 3°36′34″W
- Location: near Dartmouth, Devon
- Website: www.blackpoolsands.co.uk

Blackpool Sands is a private shingle beach open to the public near Dartmouth, Devon. In 2024 it was named England’s best beach by Condé Nast Traveller.

== Beach and amenities ==
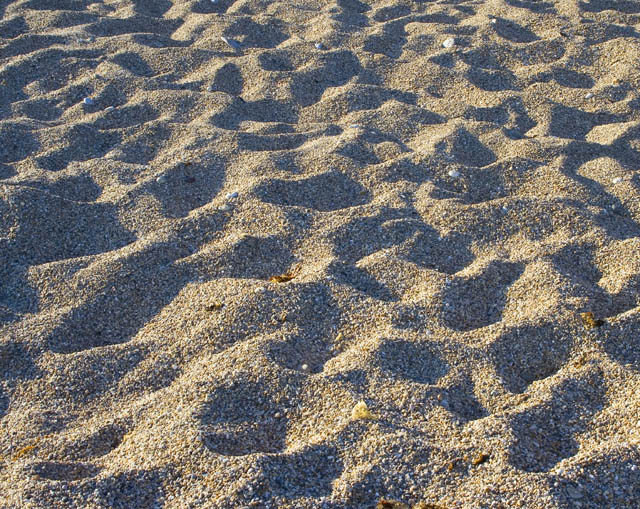
Shingle at Blackpool Sands

The beach is formed of smooth small shingle; this has been cited as the cause of the water being "astonishingly clear". The name of the beach has been branded a "misnomer", due to the lack of actual sand, however the combination of the beaches accessibility, beauty, and clear water, has resulted in positive criticism.

There is a charge for parking in the high season, a café, toilets, and a shop. Furthermore, dogs are not permitted on Blackpool Sands. In 2025, a boardwalk, made from recycled plastic, was installed on the beach to improve access for "people of all ages and abilities".

== See also ==
- Battle of Blackpool Sands
