= Nathaniel Herne (1668–1722) =

English politician (1668–1722)

Nathaniel Herne (5 March 1668 – 1 June 1722) was an English Tory politician. He sat as MP for Dartmouth from January 1701 till 1713.

He was the second son of Sir Nathaniel Herne and the brother of Frederick and Thomas Herne. His marriage to Anne, the daughter of Sir Arthur Ingram, was licensed on 13 February 1691 and they had two sons (one predeceased him) and eight daughters (three predeceased him).

In December 1691, he was listed as a minor stockholder in the East India Company. In Spring 1699, he joined the board of the Old East India Company.

In 1701, he was elected to Dartmouth and would remain unopposed with his brother Nathaniel Herne in the next five elections. In 1708, he opposed the impeachement of Dr. Henry Sacheverell. On 25 May 1711, he voted with the Whigs against Crown control of South Sea Company directors. In February 1713, he urged the removal of an embargo on East India goods to France. On 6 May 1713, he voted against lowering duties on French wine. On 18 June 1713, he voted against the French commerce bill. He did not stand in the 1713 election as local support shifted to a High Tory candidate. He attempted to regain his seat in 1715 but failed.

He died on 1 June 1722 and his estate was left mainly to his son, Nathaniel, a merchant in Cadiz.
