= Henry Bremeler =

English politician

Henry Bremeler (fl. 1407–1411) was an English politician.

He was a member (MP) of the parliament of England for Dartmouth in 1407 and for Totnes in 1411.
