= Edmund Arnold (MP) =

English politician

Edmund Arnold or Arnaud (died 1419), of Dartmouth, Devon and Gascony, was an English politician.

Arnold, who was "a Gascon by birth", was a member of parliament for Dartmouth 1395, 1410, November 1414 and 1415. He was also Mayor of Dartmouth from Michaelmas 1404 until 1408 and 1414 to 1415. He became deputy to Thomas Beaufort, Duke of Exeter in around January 1410, was deputy butler in Kingsbridge, Dartmouth, and Teignmouth from 28 March 1413 to November 1418, and was water bailiff in Dartmouth from some point before February 1417 until his death in 1419.
