= Robert Barneburgh =

14th-century English politician

Robert Barneburgh (fl. 1393) was an English politician.

He was a member (MP) of the parliament of England for Totnes in 1393.
