= Roger Scoce =

English politician

Roger Scoce (fl. 1388), of Colemore, Devon, was an English politician.

Scoce was a member (MP) of the parliament of England for Dartmouth in September 1388.
