= Frederick Herne =

English politician (1667–1714)

Frederick Herne (3 March 1667 – 15 March 1714) was an English politician. He sat as MP for Dartmouth from 1698 till his death in 1714.

He was the first son of Sir Nathaniel Herne and Judith, the daughter of Sir John Frederick. He was the brother of Nathaniel and Thomas Herne. His marriage to Elizabeth Lisle was licensed on 5 June 1688; they had one son whom predeceased him and one daughter.
