= John Henry Pyle Pafford =

- Born: . 6 March 1900; Bradford-on-Avon, Wiltshire, United Kingdom
- Died: 11 March 1996 (aged 96); Dorchester, Dorset, United Kingdom
- Known for: Librarian and Soldier, joint Instigator and team Leader of The Standard Army Unit Library

John Henry Pyle Pafford (6 March 1900 – 11 March 1996) was an English librarian of the University of London Library from 1945 to 1967 and – as Major J H Pafford, the Wiltshire Regiment ‒ joint Instigator and team Leader of The Army Standard Unit Library Project of the AEC, later the Royal Army Educational Corps, from 1942 to 1945.

He acted as an editor of The Year's Work in Librarianship from 1939 to 1950. He worked as an editor of literary texts, including the Arden edition of William Shakespeare's The Winter's Tale.

== Librarian and soldier ==
Sources for the following account are:

Obituary: 'John Pafford' by George Kane, The Independent, 26 March 1996;

Pafford: Books and Army Education, 1944–1946: Preparation and supply, by J. H. P. Pafford, London 1946;

Milne: Prefatory memoir by A. T. Milne, 'Dr J H P Pafford' in Librarianship and Literature: Essays in honour of Jack Pafford, ed. A. T. Milne [for Pafford’s 70th birthday], London 1970.

‘Jack’ Pafford ‒ "a leading international figure in the advancement of library science" ‒ had a distinguished middle age and later life. In 1993, at the age of 93, he completed his last book, John Clavell, 1601–43: highwayman, author, lawyer, doctor. He was Goldsmiths' Librarian, University of London for 27 years, having begun as pupil-teacher at Trowbridge Elementary School.

Accepted at the age of eighteen into the Inns of Court Officers' Training Corps, he gained a commission in the Wiltshire Regiment and a silver medal for boxing. He was also an excellent shot.

He did not see active service in the World War of 1914–1918, and was demobilised five months after the armistice on his 19th birthday. An ex-service grant enabled him to enter University College London. After voluntary teaching at the Working Men's College in Camden, he went on to take a London MA under R. W. Chambers, editing seventeenth-century texts.

In the inter-war years, Pafford proved himself to be an enthusiastic European: his Library Cooperation in Europe, 1935, continuing to be a valued work of reference (according to George Kane, in 1996). He played a major part in evacuating the National Central Library from London.

== World War II ==
In September 1940 was recalled by the Wiltshire Regiment, though once more confined to the Home Front on account of imperfect hearing. Promoted Captain, he commanded a company, becoming adjutant of the Wiltshire's training battalion. He continued to find connections between the lives of his men and our literary heritage, even during army exercises. He observed that his men – singing as they marched – were doing so to a variation on the ancient 'Lord Randall'. Having discussed this matter with them, he wrote to the English Folk Song Society about this interesting survival.

== The Standard Army Unit Library ==
In 1943, seconded to Southern Command, and promoted Major, he began long discussions with fellow professional librarian Captain Mainwood of the Army Education Corps (AEC). The two librarians came up with a radical idea: 'The Standard Army Unit Library'. It was to be complete, in place, available to all ranks, and in all army locations by the end of the war ‒ preferably before the end of the war; re-settlement into civilian life being a priority. It would provide purposeful leisure reading and a measure of self-education through real books, written by acknowledged practitioners or experts. It would also furnish an introduction to literature and the other arts. And the project went beyond self-education: its devisers saw the library as a resource for group-teaching and correspondence courses. The standard library stock would be augmented as required, from regional ‘Command libraries’.

All British Army Units [each comprising 400 or more troops ‒ with their own established base, camp, garrison, or barracks] were to be given charge of the same 400 volumes. That would be helpful to soldiers who moved between units in the UK or were posted overseas.

This, the standard unit library, was the key element in a project which ultimately involved 3.3 million books, selected and despatched to around 3,000 locations. It would be, as Pafford put it, 'a study and a lending library of first line value in every Unit, both at home and abroad.’

After a short period conferring with civilian institutions which had offered part-time adult education, such as 'night schools', Pafford and Mainwood set to work. The complex process of selection, prioritising, improvising, and ordering was completed in a little over two years: by seven soldier-librarians (and one civilian), from March 1944 to June 1946.

Pafford provides a brief explanation of how the 400 key books were chosen, and how to extract other information from his alphabetical lists. On this basis, Donald Measham reconstructs the Standard Unit Library’s Initial order of 24 August 1944 and discusses the balance and purposes of the library as a whole. The list is reproduced below. The typography of the original is retained: that was probably standard format for army requisitions.

== Pafford's dilemma ==
Pafford's army days were a quarter of a century behind him when he retired from his post at University College. He was presented with a volume of essays, mainly on library themes. It includes a checklist of his own publications up to 1970, including the mischievous retention of a small piece from The Field dating from 1943: 'Hare shooting with a .22.’

Milne's prefatory memoir of Jack Pafford says little about his army career, for this publication was a Festschrift from fellow librarians. A very small part of its content relates to army libraries. Milne makes a passing mention [not altogether an accurate one] to Pafford's 'satisfaction of seeing' [the unit library project] 'in full operation before his own return to civilian duties.'

In fact, Pafford left the project on 12 October 1945, two months after the surrender of Japan – with barely half of the library books distributed. Long drawn-out hostilities with Japan, and a gradual release of service personnel – which had seemed probable – would have stood the librarians' plans in better stead. 4.3 million servicemen and women had already been demobilised by the spring of 1946. The army was not in the mood for reading, for the thoughtful process of preparing for civilian life. There was rioting by impatient conscripts (Pafford left the day after the number of titles 'distributed to the Army' moved from 200 to 280, Milne, p. 39).

In 1941 he, as a serving army officer, had married Elizabeth Ford "from a family with a long Quaker tradition". The sudden end to World War II would have done more than disrupt Pafford's publication schedule. The means of its achievement, through the atomic bomb attacks on Hiroshima and Nagasaki, would have put Major Pafford and his Quaker wife in a difficult position. There is no direct mention of pacifism in the obituaries, or in Milne's tribute. However, his concluding remark about the crack shot's disengagement from weaponry is gently set in a Quaker context.

' Elizabeth Ford comes from an old Quaker family and has for some years been an elder of the Wandsworth Meeting of the Society of Friends, where Jack is an occasional "Attender".... Perhaps it was through Betty's influence that Jack laid aside his rifle for the supposedly less lethal bow and arrow. His prowess as an archer has equalled his marksmanship with the modern weapon, and only very occasionally has the stray shot over the garden wall alarmed his neighbours in Wimbledon.'

== Published works ==
The following books and pamphlets, written prior to his retirement, are listed in Milne:

- Library Cooperation in Europe (Library Association, London, 1935)
- Army Education Scheme. Librarian’s Handbook [with H R Mainwood] (War Office, 1945)
- Books and Army Education, 1944–1946: preparation and supply (Aslib, 1946)
- American and Canadian libraries: some notes on a visit in the summer of 1947 (Library Association, London, 1949)
- W. P. Ker, 1855–1923: a bibliography (London University Press, 1950)

There are also editorial works, including the Arden edition of Shakespeare’s Winter’s Tale (Methuen 1963/1965); and, for example, Accounts of the parliamentary garrisons of Great Chalfield and Malmesbury, 1645-6I (Wiltshire Archaeological and Natural History Society, 1940).
