= Joseph Herne =

English politician (1639–1699)

Sir Joseph Herne (1639 – 26 February 1699) was an English politician. He sat various times as MP for Dartmouth from 1689 till his death in 1699.

He was baptised on 17 April 1639. He was the eighth son of Nicholas Herne and the fourth son by his second wife, Susan, the daughter of Richard Ironside. He was the brother of Sir Nathaniel Herne. On 23 July 1672, he married Elizabeth, the daughter of Sir John Frederick and they had seven sons and three daughters. He was knighted on 15 September 1690.
