= John Pasford =

English politician

John Pasford or Pafford (fl. 1371–1394) of Devon, was an English politician.

He was a member (MP) of the parliament of England for Dartmouth in 1371 and for Totnes in 1386 and 1394.
