= Margaret Fownes-Luttrell =

British heiress (1726–1766)

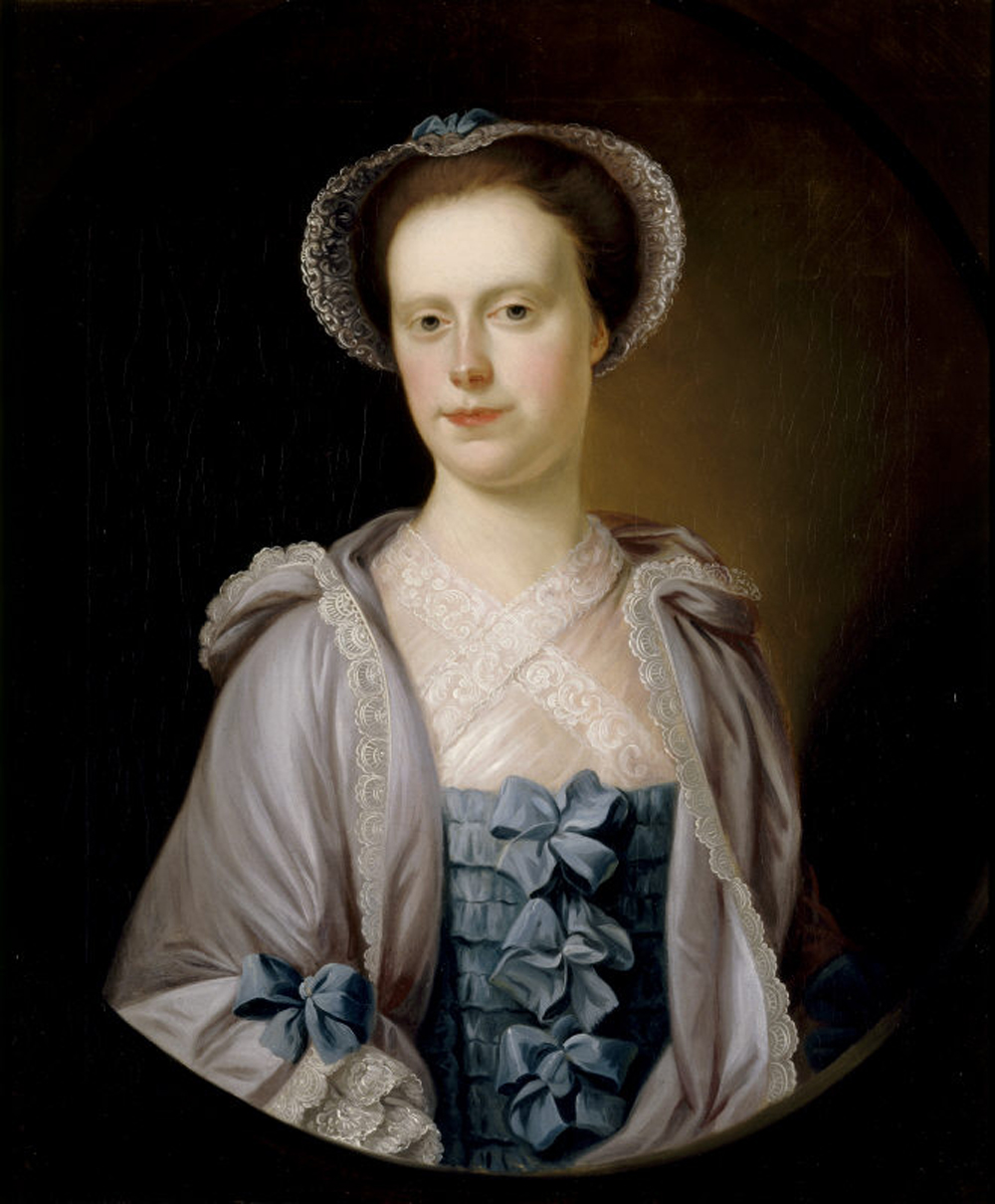
- Margaret Fownes-Luttrell, Dunster Castle by Richard Phelps
- Born: Margaret Luttrell; 7 February 1726; Dunster Castle, Dunster, England
- Died: 13 August 1766 (aged 40); Dunster Castle, Dunster, England
- Resting place: Dunster Castle
- Spouse: Henry Fownes Luttrell (1747-)

Margaret Fownes-Luttrell (Note: There was another Margaret Fownes-Luttrell, a descendant of this subject, who was an artist: Margaret Fownes-Luttrell, Mrs John Henry Southcote (1747–1792).) (7 February 1726 – 13 August 1766) was a British heiress, the wife of Henry Fownes Luttrell. She was the heiress of Dunster Castle, under the stipulation in her father's will that her husband should take the additional surname of Luttrell. Four portraits of her exist in Dunster castle and a fifth at Bathealton Court.

== Early life ==
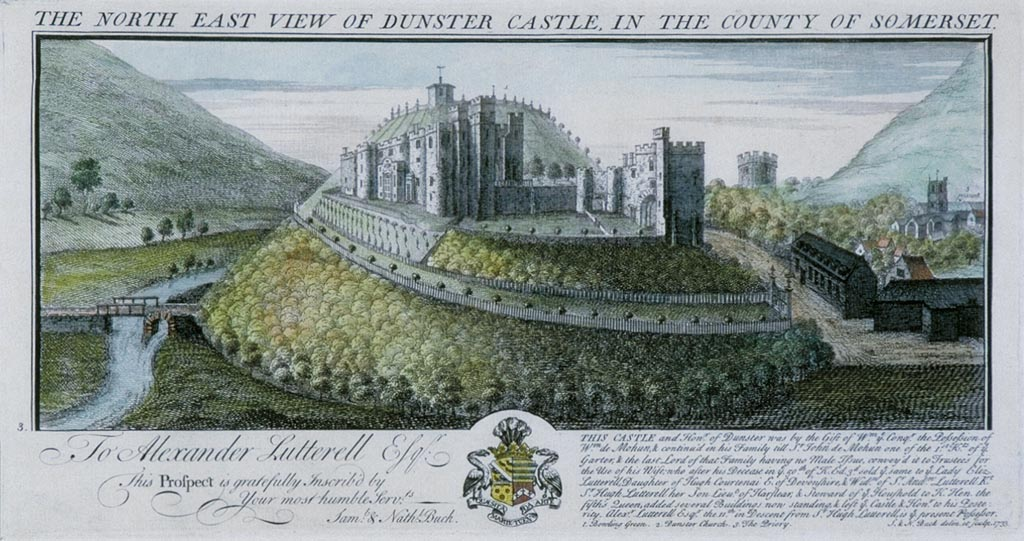
Dunster Castle in 1733, showing the then recently planted New Way, the mansion (l), Great Gatehouse (c) and stables (r). The motte, with the summer house, is visible in the background

Margaret Luttrell was born on 7 February 1726, the only child and sole heiress of Alexander Luttrell (1705–1737) of Dunster Castle by his wife Margaret Trevelyan (died 1764), daughter of Sir John Trevelyan, 2nd Baronet of Nettlecombe, Somerset, and an artist who made floral paintings. Margaret's father died on 4 June 1737 at Dunster, at which time he was in debt, "due in part to his personal extravagance and in part to the necessity imposed upon him by his parents of providing a fortune of £10,000 for Anne Luttrell," daughter of his deceased brother Francis Luttrell (1709–1732) of Venn, Somerset, and wife of Edmund Morton Pleydell, 1734-1794. As a result, Dunster Castle was thrown into Chancery and closed.

In 1741 Margaret's mother remarried to Edward Dyke of Pixton and Tetton in Somerset, and young Margaret was raised with two girls in her mother's care. One was her first cousin, Anne Luttrell, and the other was Elizabeth Dyke, Edward Dyke's cousin. The family lived at Edward Dyke's houses, Pixton and Tetton. A "moderate sum" was expended on her education, which included music lessons, and care.

Margaret Trevelyan died in 1764.

== Marriage and progeny ==
On 16 February 1747, when she came of age, in Kingston St Mary Church she married her second cousin Henry Fownes (d.1780) of Nethway House, Kingswear (historically in Brixham), Devon. Both shared as a great-grandfather Edward Yard (1638–1703) of Churston Ferrers, MP for Ashburton in 1685, who himself was a grandson of Thomas Fownes (d.1635), Mayor of Plymouth in 1619. They thus also shared the same great-great-great grandfather as Thomas Fownes's great-grandson was John Fownes (1661–1731) of Kittery Court, Whitley, Devon, MP for Dartmouth 1713–14, grandfather of Henry Fownes (d.1780), husband of Margaret Luttrell. On their marriage Dunster Castle became the property of her husband (married women in England were legally incapable of owning property until 1882), who adopted the additional surname Luttrell after his own, and adopted the Luttrell arms (but continued to quarter Fownes), in accordance with a stipulation in Alexander Luttrell's will. They moved into Dunster Castle and updated the interior with Chinese painted wallpaper and new furniture in a Rococo style. New windows were installed in the stair hall and dining room. The marriage was a happy one and resulted in the birth of ten children, including:

- John Fownes Luttrell (1752–1816), eldest son and heir, of Dunster Castle, MP for Minehead (1776–1816), the Luttrell pocket borough adjacent to Dunster Castle;
- Lieutenant Henry Fownes-Luttrell (1753–1777), 2nd son, who died unmarried.
- Rev. Alexander Fownes Luttrell (born 1754), 3rd son, Rector of East Quantoxhead, which manor had been held by the Luttrells since 1232, and Vicar of Minehead.
- Francis Fownes Luttrell (1756–1823), 4th son, a barrister of the Middle Temple, a commissioner of customs and MP for Minehead 1780-3;
- Lt-Col. Thomas Fownes Luttrell (1763–1811), 5th son;
- Margaret Fownes-Luttrell (1747–1792), only daughter, whose three portraits are on display in Dunster Castle, one as an adult by Sir Joshua Reynolds (with a copy) and another as an infant by Phelps. She married John Henry Southcote (1747) on 24 May 1769. They had two daughters.

After her death John married Priscilla Aston and they had three sons and a daughter. Josias Southcote (1798) Henry Aston (born Southcote)(1804–1888). Note: He was baptised again in 1821 as Henry Aston. Isabella Southcote (1809) Thomas Southcote (1812)

As mistress of Dunster Castle, Margaret was noted in contemporary accounts for her hospitality and patronage of local causes in Minehead and the surrounding parishes. Surviving correspondence suggests that she managed much of the household and estate affairs while her husband was occupied with political and business matters, helping to restore the family’s local standing after years of financial uncertainty.

== Death and burial ==
Margaret Fownes-Luttrell died on 13 August 1766 and was buried at Dunster Castle.
