= Dartmouth (constituency) =

Former parliamentary constituency in the United Kingdom

- Former borough constituency for the House of Commons

1351–1868
- Seats: two (1351–1832); one (1832–1868)
- Replaced by: South Devon

Dartmouth, also sometimes called Clifton, Dartmouth and Hardness, was a parliamentary borough in Devon which elected two Members of Parliament (MPs) to the House of Commons in 1298 and to the House of Commons of England, Great Britain, and the United Kingdom from 1351 until 1832, and then one member from 1832 until 1868, when the borough was disfranchised.

== History ==
Clifton, Dartmouth and Hardness were three towns clustered round the mouth of the River Dart in southern Devon; all three are within the modern town of Dartmouth. The borough as first represented in 1298 seems to have included only the town of Dartmouth, but at the next return of members in 1350–1351 it also included Clifton; Hardness is first mentioned in 1553, though may have been included earlier. The boundaries by the 19th century included the whole of Dartmouth St Petrox and St Saviour parishes, and part of Townstall parish.

Dartmouth by the end of the 18th century was a prosperous small port, depending mainly on fishing but also with some shipbuilding interests; but the bulk of the inhabitants had little voice in the choice of its Members of Parliament. After a decision by Parliament that followed a disputed election in 1689, the right to vote in Dartmouth rested with the corporation, which appointed its own successors, and with the freemen of the borough, who were made by the corporation. This amounted to a total of 71 voters in 1832, although only 53 of these were resident; virtually all were officers of the custom house or other government employees.

This franchise meant that once control was gained of the borough it was easy to retain indefinitely. Around the turn of the 18th century, the Herne family had almost total control, but in the mid-to-late 18th and early 19th century, control had passed to the government and Dartmouth was considered a safe seat for the party in power, returning one member at the nomination of the Treasury and one of the Admiralty. (Even this control had its limits however – Namier and Brooke quote letters to show that when a vacancy arose in 1757, the government had to abandon their original intention of nominating a soldier, and instead acceded to the corporation's demand for a naval candidate.) The Holdsworth family managed the government's interests in the borough, and generally had first refusal on one of the seats. Indeed, the Holdsworths were sufficiently influential to defy the government on occasion, as in 1780 when Arthur Holdsworth arranged the re-election of the popular but opposition-supporting naval hero Lord Howe to one seat while taking the other for himself – no government candidates stood against them, and both Howe and Holdsworth voted with the opposition in the new Parliament.

At the time of the Great Reform Act, the 1831 census showed that there were 611 houses in the borough but a population of 4,447. Dartmouth was allowed to keep one of its two MPs, and the boundaries were extended slightly to include the whole of Townstall parish and part of Stoke Fleming, bringing the population up to 4,662.

The constituency was abolished at the next boundary revision, which came into effect at the general election of 1868, after which the towns were part of the Southern Devon county division.

== Members of Parliament ==
=== 1351–1640 ===
| Parliament | First member | Second member |
|---|---|---|
| 1368 | Richard Whitelegh | |
| 1371 | John Pasford | |
| 1377 | Thomas Raymond | |
| 1386 | Richard Whitelegh | Robert More |
| 1388 (Feb) | William Burlestone | John Lacche |
| 1388 (Sep) | William Bast | Roger Scoce |
| 1390 (Jan) | John Hawley | Thomas Asshenden I |
| 1390 (Nov) | | |
| 1391 | John William | John Brasuter |
| 1393 | John Ellemede | John Hawley |
| 1394 | William Damiet | John Hawley |
| 1395 | John Bosom | Edmund Arnold |
| 1397 (Jan) | John Bosom | William Glover |
| 1397 (Sep) | | |
| 1399 | | |
| 1401 | | |
| 1402 | John Hawley (the elder) | Ralph North |
| 1404 (Jan) | | |
| 1404 (Oct) | | |
| 1406 | John Foxley | John White |
| 1407 | Henry Bremeler | John Pille |
| 1410 | John Hawley (the younger) | Edmund Arnold |
| 1411 | John Hawley | John Corp |
| 1413 (Feb) | | |
| 1413 (May) | John Hawley | John Corp |
| 1414 (Apr) | | |
| 1414 (Nov) | John Hawley | Edmund Arnold |
| 1415–6 (Mar) | Edmund Arnold | Walter Wodeland |
| 1416 (Oct) | | |
| 1417 | | |
| 1419 | | |
| 1420 | Thomas Asshenden II | Walter Wodeland |
| 1421 (May) | John Hawley | Thomas Hankyn |
| 1421 (Dec) | John Burley | Henry Sadeler |
| 1510–1523 | No names known | |
| 1529 | John Trevanion | William Holland, repl. 1534 by Nicholas Langmede |
| 1536 | ? | |
| 1539 | John Ridgeway | William Holland |
| 1542 | John Anthony | William Holland |
| 1545 | Nicholas Bacon | John Ridgeway |
| 1547 | Sir Peter Carew | Richard Duke |
| 1553 (Mar) | Nicholas Adams alias Bodrugan | Gilbert Roupe |
| 1553 (Oct) | Michael Adams | Michael Roope |
| Parliament of 1554 | Nicholas Adams | Edmund Sture |
| Parliament of 1554–1555 | John Petre | Nicholas Enis |
| Parliament of 1555 | Sir John St Leger | James Courtenay |
| Parliament of 1558 | Gregory Huckmore | Thomas Gurney |
| Parliament of 1559 | Thomas Southcote | Edward Yarde |
| Parliament of 1563–1567 | Sir John More | John Lovell |
| Parliament of 1571 | John Vaughan | Thomas Gurney |
| Parliament of 1572–1581 | William Cardinall | Thomas Gurney died and repl. 1576 by William Lyster |
| Parliament of 1584–1585 | Hugh Vaughan | Thomas Ridgeway |
| Parliament of 1586–1587 | Robert Petre | George Cary |
| Parliament of 1588–1589 | Robert Papworth | Richard Drewe |
| Parliament of 1593 | Nicholas Hayman | Thomas Holland |
| Parliament of 1597–1598 | John Osborne(?) | William Bastard |
| Parliament of 1601 | John Traherne | William Bastard |
| Parliament of 1604–1611 | Thomas Holland | Thomas Gurney |
| Addled Parliament (1614) | Thomas Holland | Thomas Gurney |
| Parliament of 1621–1622 | Robert Matthew | William Nyell |
| Happy Parliament (1624–1625) | Richard Matthew | William Plumley |
| Useless Parliament (1625) | Roger Matthew | John Upton |
| Parliament of 1625–1626 | Roger Matthew | John Upton |
| Parliament of 1628–1629 | Roger Matthew | John Upton |
No Parliament summoned 1629–1640

=== 1640–1832 ===
| Year | First member | First party | Second member | Second party |
|---|---|---|---|---|
| April 1640 | Andrew Voysey | | John Upton | |
| November 1640 | Roger Matthew | Royalist | John Upton | |
| 1641 | Roger Matthew | Royalist | Samuel Browne | Parliamentarian |
| February 1644 | Matthew disabled from sitting – seat vacant | | Samuel Browne | Parliamentarian |
| 1646 | Thomas Boone | | Samuel Browne | Parliamentarian |
| December 1648 | Thomas Boone | | Browne excluded in Pride's Purge – seat vacant | |
| 1653 | Dartmouth was unrepresented in the Barebones Parliament | | | |
| 1654 | Thomas Boone | | Dartmouth had only one seat in the First and Second Parliaments of the Protectorate | |
| 1656 | Edward Hopkins | | Dartmouth had only one seat in the First and Second Parliaments of the Protectorate | |
| January 1659 | Thomas Boone | | Colonel John Clarke | |
| May 1659 | Not represented in the restored Rump | | | |
| 1660 | John Frederick | | John Hale | |
| 1661 | William Harbord | | Thomas Southcote | |
| 1664 | William Harbord | | Thomas Kendall | |
| 1667 | William Harbord | | Walter Yonge | |
| 1670 | William Harbord | | William Gould (1640–1671) of Floyer Hayes, Exeter | |
| 1673 | William Harbord | | Josiah Child | |
| February 1679 | Sir Nathaniel Herne | | John Upton | |
| August 1679 | Edward Yarde | | John Upton | |
| 1685 | Roger Pomeroy | | Arthur Farwell | |
| January 1689 | Charles Boone | | William Hayne | |
| September 1689 | George Booth | | William Hayne | |
| November 1689 | Sir Joseph Herne | | William Hayne | |
| 1698 | Sir Joseph Herne | | Frederick Herne | |
| 1699 | ? | | Frederick Herne | |
| 1701 | Nathaniel Herne | | Frederick Herne | |
| 1713 | Sir William Drake | | Frederick Herne | |
| 1714 | Sir William Drake | | John Fownes | |
| 1715 | Joseph Herne | | John Fownes (junior) | |
| 1722 | George Treby III | | Thomas Martyn | |
| 1727 | George Treby II | Whig | Walter Carey | Whig |
| 1742 | Lord Archibald Hamilton | | Walter Carey | Whig |
| 1747 | John Jeffreys | Whig | Walter Carey | Whig |
| 1757 | John Jeffreys | Whig | Captain the Hon. Richard Howe | |
| 1766 | Richard Hopkins | | Captain the Hon. Richard Howe | |
| 1780 | Arthur Holdsworth | | Captain the Hon. Richard Howe | |
| 1782 | Arthur Holdsworth | | Charles Brett | Rockingham Whig |
| 1784 | Arthur Holdsworth | | Richard Hopkins | |
| 1787 | Edmund Bastard | | Richard Hopkins | |
| 1790 | Edmund Bastard | | John Charles Villiers | |
| 1802 | Edmund Bastard | Tory | Arthur Howe Holdsworth | Tory |
| 1812 | Edmund Pollexfen Bastard | Tory | Arthur Howe Holdsworth | Tory |
| 1816 | John Bastard | Tory | Arthur Howe Holdsworth | Tory |
| 1820 | John Bastard | Tory | Charles Milner Ricketts | Tory |
| 1822 | John Bastard | Tory | James Hamilton Stanhope | Tory |
| 1825 | John Bastard | Tory | Sir John Hutton Cooper | Tory |
| 1829 | John Bastard | Tory | Arthur Howe Holdsworth | Tory |
| 1832 | Representation reduced to one member | | | |

=== 1832–1868 ===
| Year | Member | Party |
|---|---|---|
| 1832 | (Sir) John Seale | Whig |
| 1844 | Joseph Somes | Conservative |
| 1845 | George Moffatt | Radical |
| 1852 | Sir Thomas Herbert | Conservative |
| 1857 | James Caird | Peelite |
| April 1859 | Edward Wyndham Harrington Schenley | Liberal |
| August 1859 | John Dunn | Conservative |
| 1860 | John Hardy | Conservative |
| 1868 | Constituency abolished | |

== Election results ==
=== Elections in the 1830s ===
General election 1830: Dartmouth (2 seats)
| Party | Candidate | Votes | % | ±% |
|---|---|---|---|---|
| Tory | John Bastard | 21 | 7.5 | N/A |
| Tory | Arthur Howe Holdsworth | 21 | 7.5 | N/A |
| Whig | Henry Willoughby | 119 | 42.5 | N/A |
| Whig | John Henry Seale | 119 | 42.5 | N/A |
| Majority | | −98 | −35.0 | N/A |
| Turnout | | 21 (eligible) | c. 48.8 | N/A |
| Registered electors | | c. 43 | | |
| Tory hold | | Swing | N/A | |
| Tory hold | | Swing | N/A | |

The 119 votes for Willoughby and Seale were declared void as they were placed by ineligible householders.

General election 1831: Dartmouth (2 seats)
| Party | Candidate | Votes | % | ±% |
|---|---|---|---|---|
| Tory | John Bastard | Unopposed | | |
| Tory | Arthur Howe Holdsworth | Unopposed | | |
| Registered electors | | 43 | | |
| Tory hold | | | | |
| Tory hold | | | | |

General election 1832: Dartmouth
| Party | Candidate | Votes | % | ±% |
|---|---|---|---|---|
| Whig | John Henry Seale | Unopposed | | |
| Registered electors | | 243 | | |
| Whig gain from Tory | | | | |

General election 1835: Dartmouth
| Party | Candidate | Votes | % | ±% |
|---|---|---|---|---|
| Whig | John Henry Seale | Unopposed | | |
| Registered electors | | 240 | | |
| Whig hold | | | | |

General election 1837: Dartmouth
| Party | Candidate | Votes | % | ±% |
|---|---|---|---|---|
| Whig | John Henry Seale | Unopposed | | |
| Registered electors | | 257 | | |
| Whig hold | | | | |

=== Elections in the 1840s ===
General election 1841: Dartmouth
| Party | Candidate | Votes | % | ±% |
|---|---|---|---|---|
| Whig | John Henry Seale | Unopposed | | |
| Registered electors | | 276 | | |
| Whig hold | | | | |

Seale's death caused a by-election.

By-election, 27 December 1844: Dartmouth
| Party | Candidate | Votes | % | ±% |
|---|---|---|---|---|
| Conservative | Joseph Somes | 125 | 51.4 | New |
| Radical | George Moffatt | 118 | 48.6 | N/A |
| Majority | | 7 | 2.8 | N/A |
| Turnout | | 243 | 86.2 | N/A |
| Registered electors | | 282 | | |
| Conservative gain from Whig | | Swing | N/A | |

Somes' death caused a by-election.

By-election, 3 July 1845: Dartmouth
| Party | Candidate | Votes | % | ±% |
|---|---|---|---|---|
| Radical | George Moffatt | 125 | 53.0 | N/A |
| Conservative | Henry Thoby Prinsep | 111 | 47.0 | N/A |
| Majority | | 14 | 6.0 | N/A |
| Turnout | | 236 | 83.7 | N/A |
| Registered electors | | 282 | | |
| Radical gain from Whig | | Swing | N/A | |

General election 1847: Dartmouth
| Party | Candidate | Votes | % | ±% |
|---|---|---|---|---|
| Radical | George Moffatt | Unopposed | | |
| Registered electors | | 376 | | |
| Radical gain from Whig | | | | |

=== Elections in the 1850s ===
General election 1852: Dartmouth
| Party | Candidate | Votes | % | ±% |
|---|---|---|---|---|
| Conservative | Thomas Herbert | 146 | 52.0 | New |
| Whig | William Schaw Lindsay | 135 | 48.0 | N/A |
| Majority | | 11 | 4.0 | N/A |
| Turnout | | 281 | 93.0 | N/A |
| Registered electors | | 302 | | |
| Conservative gain from Radical | | Swing | N/A | |

General election 1857: Dartmouth
| Party | Candidate | Votes | % | ±% |
|---|---|---|---|---|
| Peelite | James Caird | 127 | 57.5 | N/A |
| Whig | Charles Seale-Hayne | 94 | 42.5 | −5.5 |
| Majority | | 33 | 15.0 | N/A |
| Turnout | | 221 | 82.2 | −10.8 |
| Registered electors | | 269 | | |
| Peelite gain from Conservative | | Swing | +5.5 | |

General election 1859: Dartmouth
| Party | Candidate | Votes | % | ±% |
|---|---|---|---|---|
| Liberal | Edward Wyndham Harrington Schenley | 123 | 51.5 | +9.0 |
| Conservative | Thomas Herbert | 116 | 48.5 | −9.0 |
| Majority | | 7 | 3.0 | −12.0 |
| Turnout | | 239 | 93.0 | +10.8 |
| Registered electors | | 257 | | |
| Liberal hold | | Swing | N/A | |

The election was declared void on petition due to bribery and corruption, causing a by-election.

By-election, 8 August 1859: Dartmouth
| Party | Candidate | Votes | % | ±% |
|---|---|---|---|---|
| Conservative | John Dunn | Unopposed | | |
| Conservative gain from Liberal | | | | |

=== Elections in the 1860s ===
Dunn's death caused a by-election.

By-election, 3 November 1860: Dartmouth
| Party | Candidate | Votes | % | ±% |
|---|---|---|---|---|
| Conservative | John Hardy | 112 | 50.5 | +2.0 |
| Liberal | Charles Seale-Hayne | 110 | 49.5 | −2.0 |
| Majority | | 2 | 1.0 | N/A |
| Turnout | | 222 | 90.2 | −2.8 |
| Registered electors | | 246 | | |
| Conservative gain from Liberal | | Swing | +2.0 | |

General election 1865: Dartmouth
| Party | Candidate | Votes | % | ±% |
|---|---|---|---|---|
| Conservative | John Hardy | Unopposed | | |
| Registered electors | | 282 | | |
| Conservative gain from Liberal | | | | |
